= Ski jumping at the 1964 Winter Olympics – Large hill individual =

Men's large hill individual at the IX Olympic Winter Games
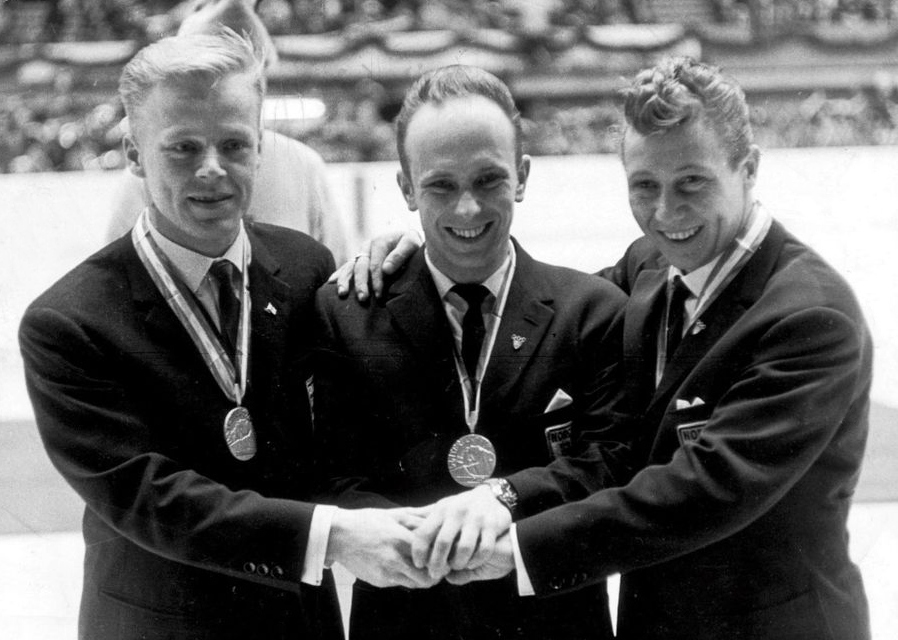
- Left-right:Kankkonen, Engan and Brandtzaeg
- Venue: Bergiselschanze
- Dates: February 9, 1964
- Competitors: 52 from 15 nations
- Winning score: 232.0

Medalists
1st place, gold medalist(s)		Toralf Engan; Norway
2nd place, silver medalist(s)		Veikko Kankkonen; Finland
3rd place, bronze medalist(s)		Torgeir Brandtzæg; Norway

The men's large hill individual ski jumping competition for the 1964 Winter Olympics was held in Bergiselschanze. It occurred on 9 February.

== Results ==
Each competitor took three jumps, with the best two counting.

Rank	Athlete	Country	Jump 1	Jump 2	Jump 3	Total
1st place, gold medalist(s)	Toralf Engan	Norway	114.7	116.0	~~88.9~~	230.7
2nd place, silver medalist(s)	Veikko Kankkonen	Finland	118.9	110.0	~~85.6~~	228.9
3rd place, bronze medalist(s)	Torgeir Brandtzæg	Norway	~~109.1~~	113.2	114.0	227.2
4	Dieter Bokeloh	United Team of Germany	108.1	~~99.5~~	106.5	214.6
5	Kjell Sjöberg	Sweden	103.8	~~98.8~~	110.6	214.4
6	Aleksandr Ivannikov	Soviet Union	106.8	~~99.2~~	106.5	213.3
7	Helmut Recknagel	United Team of Germany	107.0	105.8	~~98.2~~	212.8
8	Dieter Neuendorf	United Team of Germany	109.8	102.8	~~101.8~~	212.6
9	Józef Przybyła	Poland	106.1	105.2	~~88.5~~	211.3
10	Dalibor Motejlek	Czechoslovakia	106.5	102.3	~~99.6~~	208.8
11	Yukio Kasaya	Japan	101.6	105.1	~~85.9~~	206.7
12	Willi Egger	Austria	100.0	106.0	~~98.7~~	206.0
13	Giacomo Aimoni	Italy	102.3	103.6	~~97.4~~	205.9
14	Niilo Halonen	Finland	105.8	100.0	~~96.2~~	205.8
15	Piotr Wala	Poland	~~97.0~~	105.9	99.6	205.5
16	Bjørn Wirkola	Norway	~~99.2~~	104.9	~~99.2~~	204.1
17	Otto Leodolter	Austria	101.1	102.9	~~88.9~~	204.0
18	Baldur Preiml	Austria	~~96.1~~	106.0	97.2	203.2
19	Zbyněk Hubač	Czechoslovakia	102.3	~~99.5~~	99.6	201.9
20	Pyotr Kovalenko	Soviet Union	99.1	~~96.2~~	102.3	201.4
21	Karl-Heinz Munk	United Team of Germany	~~74.4~~	104.5	96.1	200.6
22	Josef Matouš	Czechoslovakia	96.2	104.1	~~63.0~~	200.3
23	Ensio Hyytiä	Finland	101.6	~~94.4~~	96.9	198.5
24	Gene Kotlarek	United States	100.1	~~93.6~~	97.4	197.5
25	Nilo Zandanel	Italy	100.7	96.7	~~83.9~~	197.4
26	Andrzej Sztolf	Poland	96.7	~~96.3~~	99.5	196.2
27	K'oba Ts'akadze	Soviet Union	99.1	96.5	~~94.7~~	195.6
28	Torbjørn Yggeseth	Norway	96.7	98.8	~~91.4~~	195.5
29	Kurt Elimä	Sweden	100.1	95.2	~~89.9~~	195.3
29	David Hicks	United States	~~93.5~~	98.9	96.4	195.3
31	Antero Immonen	Finland	98.9	95.9	~~94.9~~	194.8
32	Olle Martinsson	Sweden	~~87.9~~	99.7	93.8	193.5
33	Ansten Samuelstuen	United States	93.0	96.0	~~90.9~~	189.0
34	László Gellér	Hungary	~~65.6~~	95.3	92.1	187.4
35	Ryszard Witke	Poland	96.4	~~89.0~~	90.9	187.3
36	Miro Oman	Yugoslavia	~~89.4~~	92.2	93.3	185.5
37	Naoki Shimura	Japan	94.1	90.4	~~78.4~~	184.5
38	Nikolay Kamenskiy	Soviet Union	~~89.4~~	94.3	89.9	184.2
39	Peter Eržen	Yugoslavia	93.0	~~84.9~~	88.4	181.4
40	Božo Jemc	Yugoslavia	89.6	91.3	~~84.9~~	180.9
41	John Balfanz	United States	94.8	~~83.4~~	85.4	180.2
42	Ludvik Zajc	Yugoslavia	91.5	88.6	~~78.9~~	180.1
43	Sepp Lichtenegger	Austria	~~48.9~~	102.0	77.9	179.9
44	Yosuke Eto	Japan	91.4	~~83.9~~	86.4	177.8
45	Kaare Lien	Canada	91.4	83.9	~~74.0~~	175.3
46	Heribert Schmid	Switzerland	84.9	90.1	~~77.6~~	175.0
47	Sadao Kikuchi	Japan	87.4	87.4	~~86.9~~	174.8
48	Josef Zehnder	Switzerland	88.9	~~47.9~~	83.4	172.3
49	László Csávás	Hungary	~~81.4~~	83.9	85.9	169.8
50	John McInnes	Canada	86.4	80.9	~~79.4~~	167.3
51	Ueli Scheidegger	Switzerland	~~42.4~~	78.9	75.4	154.3
52	Holger Karlsson	Sweden	75.4	75.7	~~54.4~~	151.1
