= 1962–63 Four Hills Tournament =

Ski jumping competition

Four Hills Tournament
- Venues: Schattenbergschanze, Bergiselschanze, Große Olympiaschanze, Paul-Ausserleitner-Schanze
- Location: Germany, Austria
- Dates: 28 December 1962 – 6 January 1963
- Competitors: 77 from 14 nations

Medalists
gold medal	(Norway) Toralf Engan
silver medal	(Norway) Torbjørn Yggeseth
bronze medal	(Germany) Max Bolkart

At the 11th annual Four Hills Tournament, the strong Norwegian team saw three of its tournament debutants within the Top 5. Toralf Engan dominated the tour with three clear victories and became the second Norwegian to win the tour after Olaf Bjørnstad 10 years earlier.

== Participating nations and athletes ==
The athletes from the German Democratic Republic did not compete at the two events in Germany for political reasons.

Nation	Number of Athletes	Athletes
Germany	11	Max Bolkart, Günther Göllner, Alois Haberstock, Wolfgang Happle, Heini Ihle, Helmut Kurz, Bernd Moderegger, Sepp Schiffner, Wolfgang Schüller, Georg Thoma, Helmut Wegscheider, Hias Winkler
Austria	17	Willi Egger, Fritz Gamweger, Max Golser, Walter Habersatter, Waldemar Heigenhauser, Ernst Kopp, Willi Köstinger, Sepp Lichtenegger, Horst Moser, Peter Müller, Georg Niederhammer, Baldur Preiml, Helmut Rauter, Herbert Schiffner, Willi Schuster, Rudi Schweinberger, Walter Steinegger
Czechoslovakia	4	Josef Matouš, Dalibor Motejlek, Jiří Raška, Wladimir Tajner
East Germany	7	Dieter Bockeloh, Veit Kührt, Peter Lesser, Helmut Recknagel, Johannes Riedel, Kurt Schramm
Finland	3	Niilo Halonen, Juhani Kärkinen, Pekka Yli-Niemi
Hungary	4	László Csávás, János Horváth, Endre Kiss, Tamás Sudár
Italy	3	Giacomo Aimoni, Agosto De Zordo, Bruno De Zordo
Norway	4	Torgeir Brandtzæg, Jan Petter Devor, Toralf Engan, Torbjørn Yggeseth
Poland	5	Gustaw Bujok, Andrzej Kocyan, Antoni Łaciak, Jan Pezda, Andrzej Sztolf
Soviet Union	4	Aleksandr Ivannikov, Nikolay Kamenskiy, Nikolai Schamov, Koba Zakadze
Sweden	3	Bengt Eriksson, Olle Martinsson, Rolf Strandberg
Switzerland	3	Toni Cecchinato, Ueli Scheidegger, Heribert Schmid
United States	5	John Balfanz, John Bower, Roger Dion, Paul Johnson, Ralph Semb
Yugoslavia	4	Božo Jemc, Andrej Nahtigal, Miro Oman, Ludvik Zajc

== Results ==
=== Oberstdorf ===
(Germany) Schattenbergschanze, Oberstdorf
28 December 1962

Rank	Name	Points
1	(Norway) Toralf Engan	214.2
2	(Germany) Max Bolkart	199.3
3	(Norway) Torbjørn Yggeseth	194.8
4	(Germany) Heini Ihle	193.6
5	(Austria) Willi Egger	191.6
6	(Germany) Georg Thoma	185.3
7	(United States) John Balfanz	182.7
8	(Norway) Torgeir Brandtzæg	182.3
9	(Finland) Niilo Halonen	181.3
10	(Austria) Sepp Lichtenegger	180.5
10	(Finland) Juhani Kärkinen	180.5

=== Innsbruck ===
(Austria) Bergiselschanze, Innsbruck
30 December 1962

Rank	Name	Points
1	(Norway) Toralf Engan	231.2
2	(East Germany) Helmut Recknagel	215.7
3	(Germany) Georg Thoma	215.3
4	(Norway) Torgeir Brandtzæg	214.9
5	(East Germany) Kurt Schramm	212.1
6	(United States) John Balfanz	211.1
7	(Norway) Torbjørn Yggeseth	210.1
8	(Germany) Max Bolkart	208.8
9	(Germany) Heini Ihle	206.8
10	(Soviet Union) Aleksandr Ivannikov	205.4

=== Garmisch-Partenkirchen ===
(Germany) Große Olympiaschanze, Garmisch-Partenkirchen
1 January 1963

Rank	Name	Points
1	(Norway) Toralf Engan	229.9
2	(Germany) Georg Thoma	217.3
3	(Germany) Max Bolkart	216.9
4	(Finland) Niilo Halonen	211.4
5	(United States) John Balfanz	209.9
6	(Norway) Torbjørn Yggeseth	209.8
7	(Finland) Pekka Yli-Niemi	207.4
8	(Poland) Antoni Łaciak	206.5
9	(Czechoslovakia) Dalibor Motejlek	204.4
10	(Norway) Torgeir Brandtzæg	204.0

=== Bischofshofen ===
(Austria) Paul-Ausserleitner-Schanze, Bischofshofen
6 January 1963

After three clear victories, there was little chance for Engan's opponents to catch up to him in the overall ranking.

Within ten years, Engan was the fourth athlete to compete in Bischofshofen after having won all three previous events. Like all of his predecessors in that regard, he did not manage to secure a fourth victory.

John Balfanz became the first non-European to finish on a podium at a Four Hills event.

Rank	Name	Points
1	(Norway) Torbjørn Yggeseth	205.0
2	(Norway) Torgeir Brandtzæg	199.5
3	(United States) John Balfanz	197.5
4	(Norway) Toralf Engan	195.4
5	(Germany) Max Bolkart	191.8
6	(Austria) Baldur Preiml	188.4
7	(Austria) Willi Egger	186.8
8	(Italy) Giacomo Aimoni	186.6
9	(Austria) Max Golser	185.6
10	(Germany) Helmut Kurz	184.6

== Final ranking ==
Rank	Name	Oberstdorf	Innsbruck	Garmisch-Partenkirchen	Bischofshofen	Points
1	(Norway) Toralf Engan	1st	1st	1st	4th	870.7
2	(Norway) Torbjørn Yggeseth	3rd	7th	6th	1st	819.7
3	(Germany) Max Bolkart	2nd	8th	3rd	5th	816.8
4	(United States) John Balfanz	7th	6th	5th	3rd	801.2
5	(Norway) Torgeir Brandtzæg	8th	4th	10th	2nd	800.7
6	(Germany) Georg Thoma	6th	3rd	2nd	15th	797.3
7	(Poland) Antoni Łaciak	13th	19th	8th	13th	759.9
8	(Austria) Willi Egger	5th	23rd	19th	7th	758.4
9	(Finland) Pekka Yli-Niemi	25th	12th	7th	26th	747.0
10	(Czechoslovakia) Josef Matouš	15th	20th	12th	18th	742.3
