= 1965–66 Four Hills Tournament =

Ski jumping competition

Four Hills Tournament
- Venues: Schattenbergschanze, Bergiselschanze, Große Olympiaschanze, Paul-Ausserleitner-Schanze
- Location: Germany, Austria
- Dates: 30 December 1965 – 6 January 1966
- Competitors: 96 from 15 nations

Medalists
gold medal	(Finland) Veikko Kankkonen
silver medal	(East Germany) Dieter Neuendorf
bronze medal	(Norway) Bjørn Wirkola

At the 14th annual Four Hills Tournament, Veikko Kankkonen became the only second athlete to win the tournament more than once, after he already emerged victorious two years before.

== Participating nations and athletes ==
The national groups of Germany and Austria only competed at the two events in their respective countries.

Nation	Number of Athletes	Athletes
Germany	10 (+5)	Günther Göllner, Wolfgang Happle, Heini Ihle, Franz Keller, Helmut Kurz, Dieter Müller, Henrik Ohlmayr, Oswald Schinze, Georg Thoma, Helmut Wegscheider; National Group: Max Bolkart, Udo Pfeffer, Helmut Reicherts, Alfred Winkler, Hias Winkler
Austria	7 (+8)	Reinhold Bachler, Max Golser, Sepp Lichtenegger, Peter Müller, Baldur Preiml, Herbert Schiffner, Willi Schuster; National Group:Walter Bründlinger, Willi Egger, Fritz Gamweger, Johann Grander, Albert Haim, Waldemar Heigenhauser, Willi Köstinger, Helmut Voggenberger
Czechoslovakia	4	Rudolf Höhnl, Josef Matouš, Dalibor Motejlek, Jiří Raška
East Germany	7	Dieter Bockeloh, Bernd Karwofski, Peter Lesser, Karl-Heinz Munk, Dietmar Neuendorf, Horst Queck, Wolfgang Schüller
Finland	7	Niilo Halonen, Seppo Hannula, Harri Jussilainen, Veikko Kankkonen, Paavo Lukkariniemi, Topi Mattila, Risto Tarkkila
France	4	Maurice Arbez, Alain Macle, Jean-Marie Poirot, Gilbert Poirot
Hungary	3	László Csávás, László Gellér, Mihály Gellér
Italy	4	Giacomo Aimoni, Mario Ceccon, Bruno De Zordo, Nilo Zandanel
Norway	4	Lars Grini, Hans Olav Sørensen, Erling Stranden, Bjørn Wirkola
Poland	6	Józef Kochel, Józef Kocyan, Antoni Łaciak, Józef Przybyła, Andrzej Sztolf, Piotr Wala
Soviet Union	4	Aleksandr Ivannikov, Juri Subarev, Mikhail Veretennikov, Koba Zakadze
Sweden	6	Kurt Elimä, Sven Magnusson, Ulf Norberg, Mats Östman, Kjell Sjöberg, Rolf Strandberg
Switzerland	6	Alois Kälin, Richard Pfiffner, Heribert Schmid, Urs Schönl, José Wirth, Sepp Zehnder
United States	4	John Balfanz, Randy Garreton, Dave Hicks, Dave Norby
Yugoslavia	7	Peter Eržen, Otto Giacomelli, Janez Jurman, Marian Koprivsek, Miro Oman, Marjan Pečar, Ludvik Zajc

== Results ==
=== Oberstdorf ===
(Germany) Schattenbergschanze, Oberstdorf
30 December 1965

Rank	Name	Points
1	(Finland) Veikko Kankkonen	213.8
2	(East Germany) Dieter Neuendorf	212.9
3	(Finland) Paavo Lukkariniemi	205.1
4	(Norway) Bjørn Wirkola	203.0
5	(United States) John Balfanz	201.5
6	(Soviet Union) Aleksandr Ivannikov	200.4
7	(Czechoslovakia) Dalibor Motejlek	200.0
8	(Czechoslovakia) Jan Matouš	198.4
9	(Poland) Piotr Wala	197.7
10	(Germany) Günther Göllner	194.5
10	(Czechoslovakia) Jiří Raška	194.5

=== Garmisch-Partenkirchen ===
(Germany) Große Olympiaschanze, Garmisch-Partenkirchen
1 January 1966

Rank	Name	Points
1	(Finland) Paavo Lukkariniemi	215.3
2	(Norway) Bjørn Wirkola	212.6
3	(Finland) Veikko Kankkonen	210.1
4	(Finland) Niilo Halonen	207.1
5	(Germany) Günther Göllner	206.8
6	(East Germany) Dieter Neuendorf	206.2
7	(Germany) Henrik Ohlmayr	205.1
8	(Czechoslovakia) Jan Matouš	204.4
9	(Finland) Harri Jussilainen	203.7
10	(East Germany) Bernd Karwofski	203.6

=== Innsbruck ===
(Austria) Bergiselschanze, Innsbruck
2 December 1966

Rank	Name	Points
1	(East Germany) Dieter Neuendorf	226.1
2	(Finland) Veikko Kankkonen	209.9
3	(Germany) Günther Göllner	209.0
4	(Czechoslovakia) Jan Matouš	208.6
5	(Finland) Paavo Lukkariniemi	208.3
6	(Soviet Union) Mikhail Veretennikov	204.9
7	(East Germany) Peter Lesser	203.7
8	(Finland) Jani Mattila	203.2
9	(United States) Dave Hicks	202.1
10	(Germany) Heini Ihle	201.9

=== Bischofshofen ===
(Austria) Paul-Ausserleitner-Schanze, Bischofshofen
6 January 1966

Rank	Name	Points
1	(Finland) Veikko Kankkonen	235.7
2	(Norway) Bjørn Wirkola	227.2
3	(East Germany) Dieter Neuendorf	221.3
4	(Sweden) Kurt Elimä	219.9
5	(Czechoslovakia) Jiří Raška	217.8
6	(Socialist Federal Republic of Yugoslavia) Peter Eržen	215.3
7	(Norway) Hans Olav Sørensen	214.9
8	(Finland) Seppo Hannula	214.8
9	(Germany) Henrik Ohlmayr	213.7
10	(Norway) Erling Stranden	212.2

== Final ranking ==
Rank	Name	Oberstdorf	Garmisch-Partenkirchen	Innsbruck	Bischofshofen	Points
1	(Finland) Veikko Kankkonen	1st	3rd	2nd	1st	869.5
2	(East Germany) Dieter Neuendorf	2nd	6th	1st	3rd	866.5
3	(Norway) Bjørn Wirkola	4th	2nd	13th	2nd	843.0
4	(Finland) Paavo Lukkariniemi	3rd	1st	5th	20th	828.7
5	(Germany) Henrik Ohlmayr	16th	7th	17th	9th	806.8
6	(Czechoslovakia) Dalibor Motejlek	7th	16th	15th	14th	795.6
7	(Norway) Hans Olav Sørensen	14th	18th	24th	7th	789.6
8	(Czechoslovakia) Jiří Raška	10th	19rd	34th	5th	787.1
9	(Czechoslovakia) Josef Matouš	8th	8th	4th	40th	786.4
10	(Poland) Piotr Wala	9th	24th	20th	13th	782.2
