= Ski jumping at the 1964 Winter Olympics – Normal hill individual =

Men's normal hill individual at the IX Olympic Winter Games
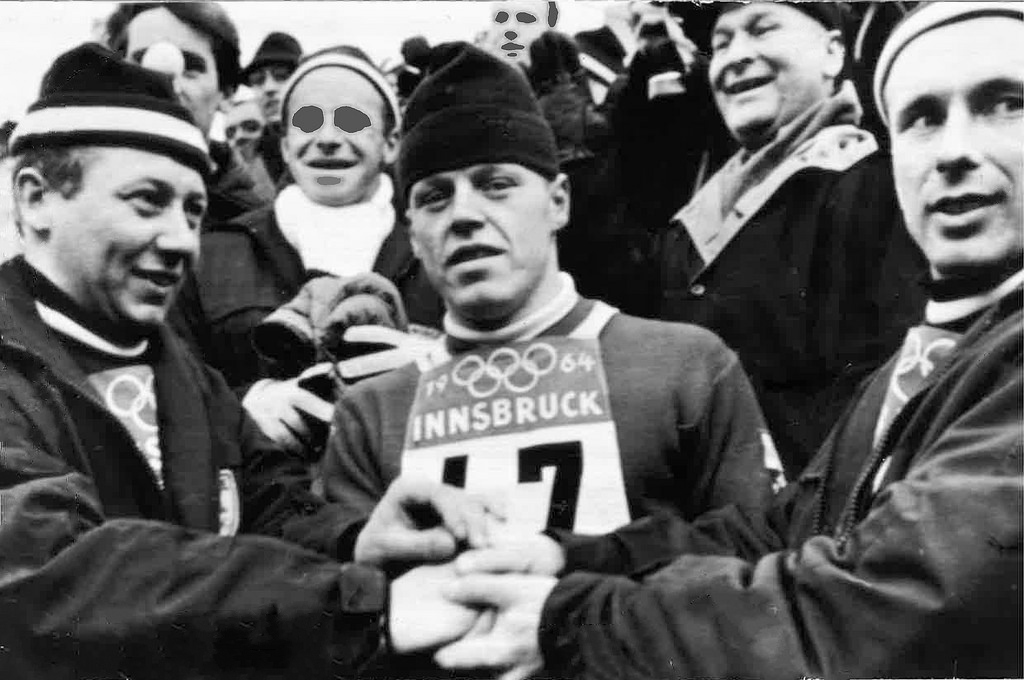
- Left-right: Brandtzæg, Kankkonen, Engan
- Venue: Seefeld
- Dates: January 31, 1964
- Competitors: 53 from 15 nations
- Winning score: 229.9

Medalists
1st place, gold medalist(s)		Veikko Kankkonen; Finland
2nd place, silver medalist(s)		Toralf Engan; Norway
3rd place, bronze medalist(s)		Torgeir Brandtzæg; Norway

The men's normal hill individual ski jumping competition for the 1964 Winter Olympics was held at Seefeld. It occurred on 31 January.

== Results ==
Rank	Athlete	Country	Jump 1	Jump 2	Jump 3	Total
1st place, gold medalist(s)	Veikko Kankkonen	Finland	~~95.9~~	115.9	114.0	229.9
2nd place, silver medalist(s)	Toralf Engan	Norway	~~112.1~~	112.3	114.0	226.3
3rd place, bronze medalist(s)	Torgeir Brandtzæg	Norway	~~98.8~~	112.6	110.3	222.9
4	Josef Matouš	Czechoslovakia	114.3	~~103.9~~	~~103.9~~	218.2
5	Dieter Neuendorf	United Team of Germany	109.3	105.4	~~102.8~~	214.7
6	Helmut Recknagel	United Team of Germany	~~101.3~~	105.4	105.0	210.4
7	Kurt Elimä	Sweden	~~102.0~~	104.1	104.8	208.9
8	Hans Olav Sørensen	Norway	106.0	~~99.5~~	102.6	208.6
9	Karl-Heinz Munk	United Team of Germany	104.9	102.1	~~100.4~~	207.0
10	John Balfanz	United States	~~102.2~~	103.9	102.6	206.5
11	Sepp Lichtenegger	Austria	~~93.4~~	102.1	103.3	205.4
12	Pyotr Kovalenko	Soviet Union	~~100.8~~	101.1	104.0	205.1
13	Baldur Preiml	Austria	101.1	103.5	~~99.2~~	204.6
14	Gene Kotlarek	United States	103.2	100.2	~~97.2~~	203.4
14	Torbjørn Yggeseth	Norway	99.0	104.4	~~97.7~~	203.4
16	Niilo Halonen	Finland	~~99.4~~	102.8	100.6	203.4
17	Aleksandr Ivannikov	Soviet Union	101.6	~~99.8~~	101.7	203.3
18	Józef Przybyła	Poland	104.5	98.7	~~95.5~~	203.2
19	Dalibor Motejlek	Czechoslovakia	100.0	102.5	~~98.4~~	202.5
20	Ensio Hyytiä	Finland	101.5	~~99.6~~	100.9	202.4
21	Nikolay Kamenskiy	Soviet Union	100.4	~~99.1~~	100.7	201.1
22	Piotr Wala	Poland	~~96.7~~	100.1	100.9	201.0
23	Yukio Kasaya	Japan	~~97.5~~	101.4	99.2	200.6
24	Ansten Samuelstuen	United States	100.1	100.3	~~98.8~~	200.4
25	Heribert Schmid	Switzerland	99.7	~~92.7~~	100.4	200.1
26	Sadao Kikuchi	Japan	~~95.9~~	99.7	98.8	198.5
27	Yosuke Eto	Japan	~~94.2~~	98.4	100.0	198.4
28	Otto Leodolter	Austria	~~96.4~~	99.7	97.6	197.3
28	Giacomo Aimoni	Italy	~~96.1~~	96.9	100.4	197.3
30	Zbyněk Hubač	Czechoslovakia	98.3	98.5	~~93.7~~	196.8
31	Antero Immonen	Finland	~~95.4~~	97.7	97.6	195.3
32	Olle Martinsson	Sweden	~~93.9~~	98.7	96.1	194.8
33	Kjell Sjöberg	Sweden	98.4	96.2	~~91.4~~	194.6
34	Antoni Łaciak	Poland	95.1	99.2	~~91.7~~	194.3
35	Holger Karlsson	Sweden	~~93.8~~	96.7	97.1	193.8
36	Nikolay Shamov	Soviet Union	96.7	~~95.2~~	95.4	192.1
37	Nilo Zandanel	Italy	~~93.9~~	95.9	95.6	191.5
37	Max Bolkart	United Team of Germany	~~92.7~~	98.1	93.4	191.5
39	Ludvik Zajc	Yugoslavia	95.6	~~95.4~~	95.6	191.2
40	Naoki Shimura	Japan	~~93.5~~	95.2	95.7	190.9
41	David Hicks	United States	~~92.6~~	95.4	94.9	190.3
42	László Gellér	Hungary	~~63.7~~	97.9	91.6	189.5
43	Kaare Lien	Canada	93.9	94.4	~~90.2~~	188.3
44	Willi Egger	Austria	~~91.7~~	94.5	92.9	187.4
45	Ryszard Witke	Poland	~~83.2~~	94.5	91.6	186.1
46	Bruno De Zordo	Italy	88.5	~~87.5~~	96.6	185.1
47	Miro Oman	Yugoslavia	93.3	87.6	~~84.9~~	180.9
48	Ueli Scheidegger	Switzerland	89.4	87.0	~~76.7~~	176.4
49	Božo Jemc	Yugoslavia	89.8	~~81.1~~	86.5	176.3
50	Peter Eržen	Yugoslavia	89.9	~~58.5~~	84.4	174.3
51	Josef Zehnder	Switzerland	88.1	~~45.5~~	83.6	171.7
52	László Csávás	Hungary	~~80.5~~	86.1	84.8	170.9
53	John McInnes	Canada	~~76.7~~	82.9	83.4	166.3
