= Ski jumping at the FIS Nordic World Ski Championships 1962 =

Ski jumping events at the 1962 FIS Nordic World Ski Championships in Zakopane, Poland

Ski jumping at the FIS Nordic World Ski Championships 1962 consisted of two individual competitions held between 21 and 25 February 1962 at ski jumping hills in Zakopane, Poland, as part of the FIS Nordic World Ski Championships 1962. For the first time in the history of the championships, two individual ski jumping events were contested: one on the K-65 hill and another on the K-90 hill. Toralf Engan won the gold medal on the K-65 hill, with Antoni Łaciak earning silver and Helmut Recknagel taking bronze. Recknagel also claimed the gold medal on the K-90 hill, followed by Nikolay Kamenskiy with silver and Niilo Halonen with bronze.

This marked the 16th occasion that ski jumpers competed at the FIS Nordic World Ski Championships, and the third time such events were held in Zakopane, following the championships in 1929 and 1939. A total of 70 athletes from 17 nations participated in the competitions.

== Pre-championship preparations ==
=== Organization ===
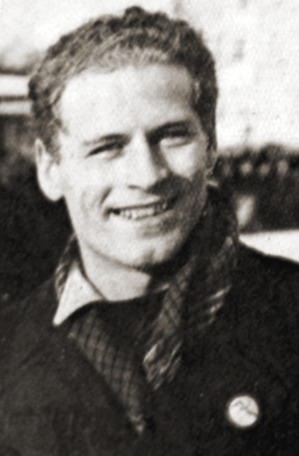
Stanisław Marusarz, the hill manager during the 1962 World Championships

Due to a lack of snowfall before the championships, organizers in Zakopane transported snow from outside the city to artificially cover the hills. This effort proved unnecessary as heavy snowfall occurred days before the events, requiring bulldozers and skiers to remove excess snow to meet the International Ski Federation's specified snow depth standards. The first jumper to test the prepared hill was Stanisław Marusarz, the manager of Wielka Krokiew, who had retired from competitive ski jumping five years earlier. Marusarz achieved a 76-meter jump, earning applause from spectators gathered at the hill.

In early February 1962, Zakopane hosted the Polish National Ski Championships as a dress rehearsal for the world championships, with identical competition formats. In the first ski jumping event on Średnia Krokiew, Piotr Wala won gold, Ryszard Witke took silver, and Józef Gąsienica-Bryjak secured bronze. On Wielka Krokiew, Wala again claimed gold, with Andrzej Kocyan earning silver and Stefan Przybyła taking bronze.

Stanisław Marusarz served as the hill manager, overseeing the organization of the world championship events, while Józef Podstolski managed the ski jumping competitions, and Hans Renner was the technical delegate from the International Ski Federation. 16 Austrian experts observed the Zakopane competitions to inform preparations for the 1964 Olympic ski jumping events in Innsbruck, praising the event's organization, particularly the lighting arrangements.

For the first time in the history of the FIS Nordic World Ski Championships, two ski jumping events were held: one on the K-65 hill and another on the K-90 hill.

=== Favorites ===
At the previous 1958 World Championships, Juhani Kärkinen won gold, Ensio Hyytiä took silver, and Helmut Recknagel secured bronze. Of these medalists, only Recknagel competed in Zakopane, joined by Antero Immonen, who finished sixth in 1958.

The 10th Four Hills Tournament, held prior to the championships, was won by Eino Kirjonen, with Wilhelm Egger in second and Hemmo Silvennoinen in third. Egger won two of the tournament's events, while Kirjonen and Georg Thoma each won one. Other favorites included Max Bolkart, Wolfgang Happle, and Jože Šlibar.

=== Commemorative postage stamps ===
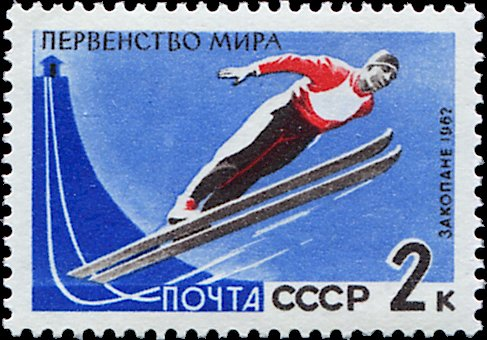
Soviet postage stamp issued for the 1962 Zakopane World Championships

To commemorate the 1962 FIS Nordic World Ski Championships in Zakopane, both Poland and the Soviet Union issued special postage stamps depicting classical skiers, including ski jumpers.

== Rules ==
In both competitions at the 1962 World Championships, each athlete performed three jumps, with the two best scores counting toward the final tally. Each jump was evaluated by five judges, who could award up to 20 points for style.

== Competition ==
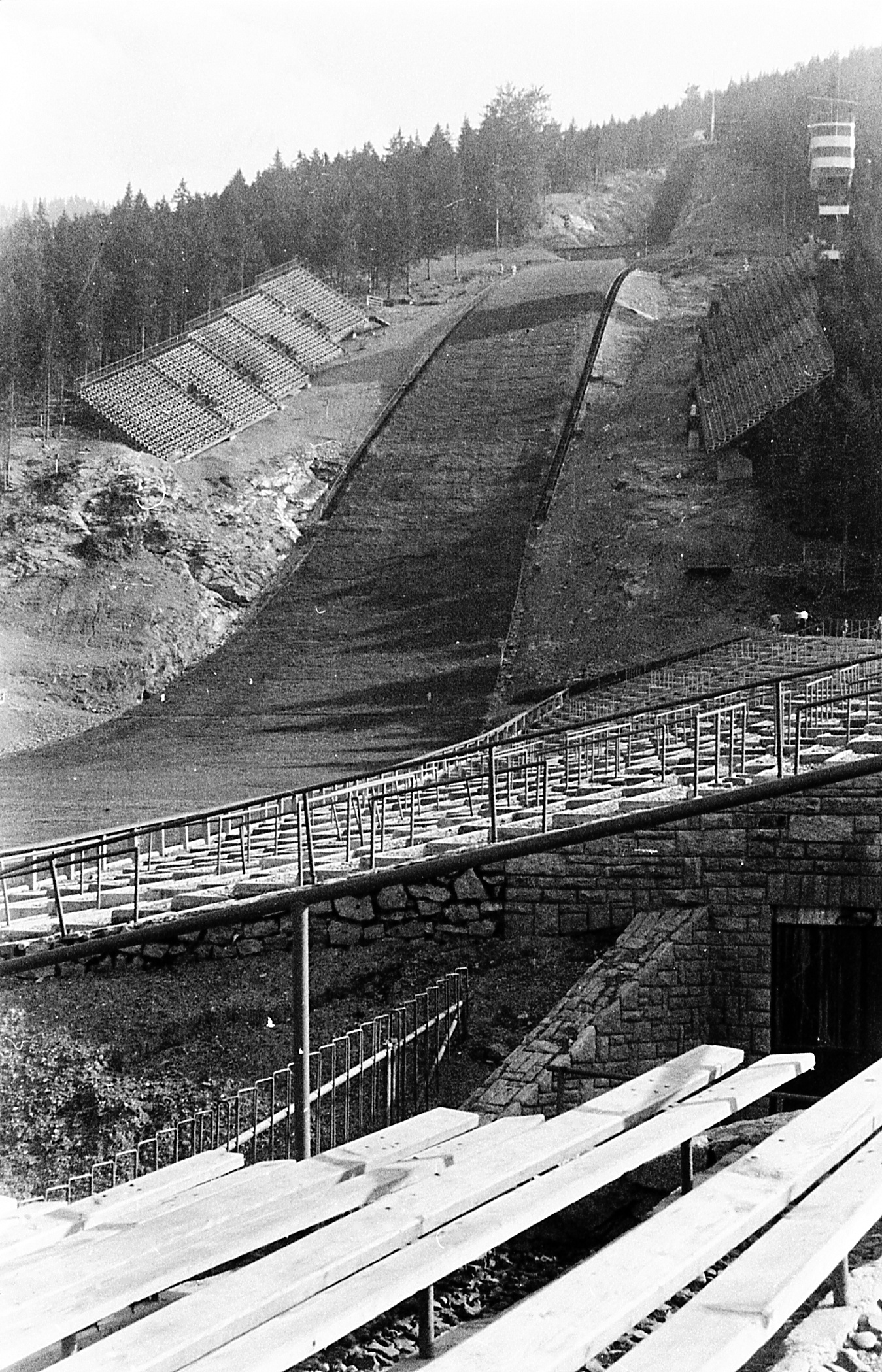
Wielka Krokiew in the 1960s

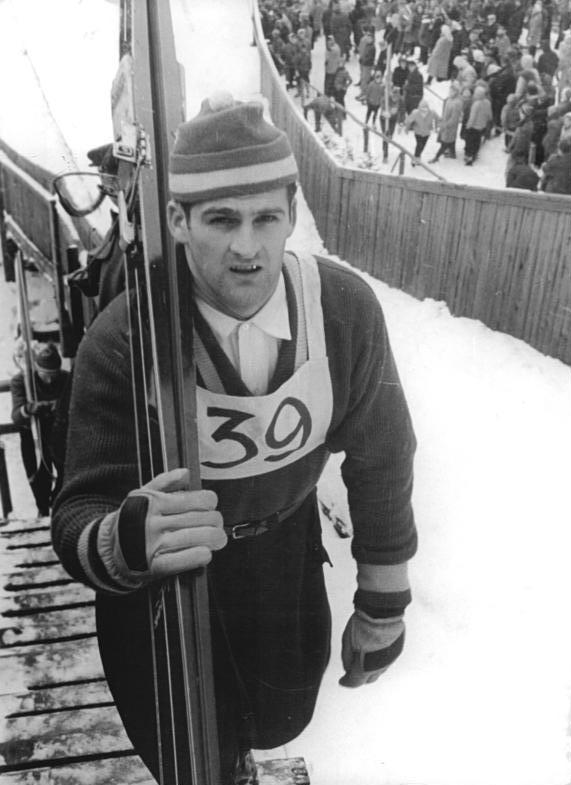
Helmut Recknagel, gold medalist on the large hill and bronze medalist on the normal hill

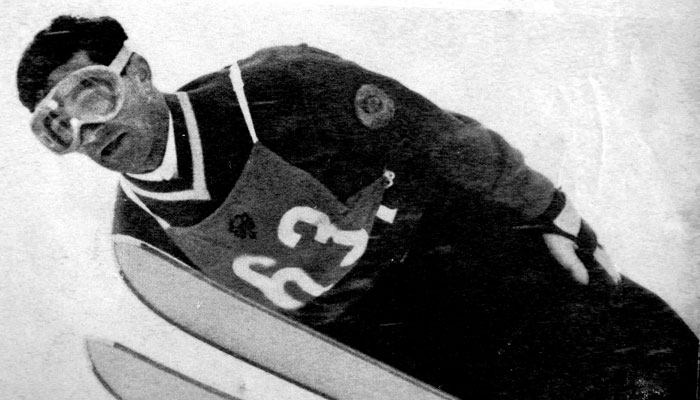
Koba Zakadze, fifth-place finisher in the normal hill competition

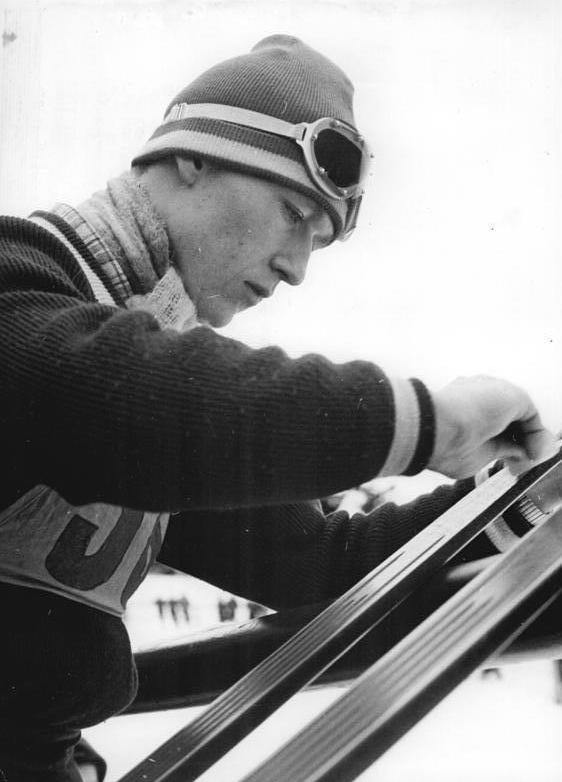
Peter Lesser, fifth-place finisher in the large hill competition

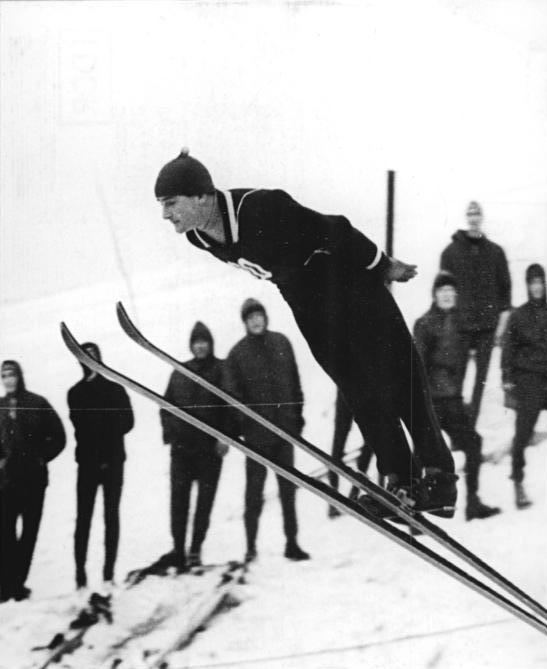
Veit Kührt, sixth-place finisher in the normal hill competition

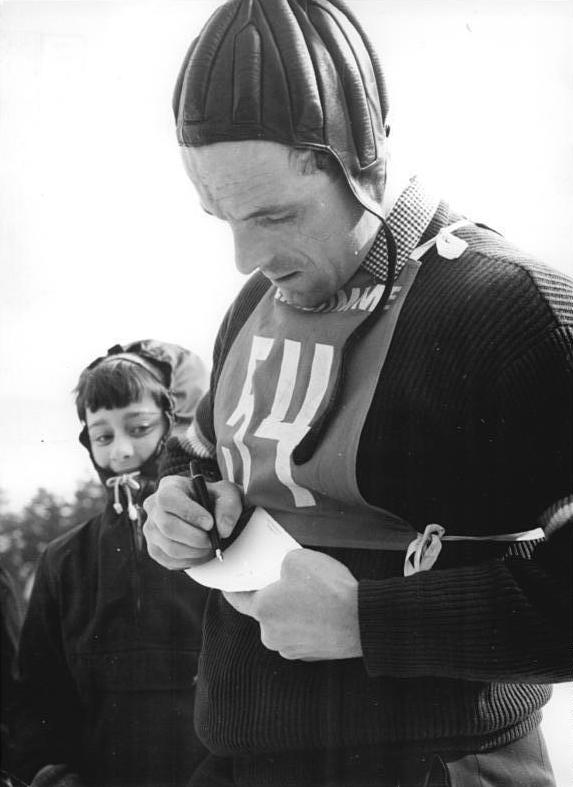
Willi Egger, seventh-place finisher in the large hill competition

The first ski jumping event of the FIS Nordic World Ski Championships 1962 took place on 21 February at Średnia Krokiew. 62 athletes competed, starting with Alois Haberstock, who jumped 61 meters. In the first round, 14 jumpers reached or exceeded the construction point at 65 meters, beginning with Nikolay Kamenskiy, who jumped exactly 65 meters. Finland's Hemmo Silvennoinen, jumping 26th, achieved 64.5 meters but surpassed Kamenskiy due to higher style scores. Kurt Schramm followed with 65.5 meters but trailed both due to lower scores. Marjan Pečar jumped 66 meters but placed lower with only 43 style points. Japan's Naoki Shimura, jumping 30th, took the lead with a 65-meter jump, holding it until Nikolai Schamov matched the distance at 65.5 meters. Helmut Recknagel then equaled Shamov's distance, taking the lead with a 0.5-point style advantage. Switzerland's Ueli Scheidegger jumped 66.5 meters but fell back due to low style scores. Willi Egger jumped 67 meters, placing second, 0.3 points behind Recknagel. Antoni Łaciak, jumping 57th, matched the round's longest jump of 68.5 meters and stood it, taking the lead with a 5.2-point margin over Recknagel. Toralf Engan followed with a 68-meter jump and the highest style scores (52.5 points), overtaking Łaciak by one point. The first round ended with Koba Zakadze jumping 65.5 meters, securing third place. Thus, Engan led after the first round, followed by Łaciak and Tsakadze.

In the second round, Hemmo Silvennoinen and Veit Kührt recorded the longest jumps at 69 meters, followed by Nikolay Kamenskiy at 68.5 meters and Torgeir Brandtzæg at 68 meters. Gustaw Bujok and Kurt Schramm both reached 67.5 meters. Among the top three from the first round, Toralf Engan maintained his lead with a 67-meter jump. Antoni Łaciak jumped 64.5 meters, dropping to fifth place. Helmut Recknagel matched Engan's 67 meters, moving to third, while Hemmo Silvennoinen advanced to second. Koba Zakadze jumped 65 meters, falling to seventh.

In the final round on Średnia Krokiew, seven jumpers exceeded 70 meters. Piotr Wala, ranked 56th after two jumps, reached 70.5 meters. Gustaw Bujok and Max Bolkart hit 71 meters, with Bujok advancing to seventh overall, while Bolkart fell to 30th due to a fall. Helmut Recknagel, Koba Zakadze, and Antoni Łaciak each jumped 71.5 meters, the round's best distance. After factoring in style scores and discarding the lowest jump, Łaciak secured second place, Recknagel took third, and Tsakadze finished fifth. Toralf Engan, with a 70.5-meter jump, won the gold medal by a 1.1-point margin over Łaciak.

The second event, held on 25 February 1962 at Wielka Krokiew, began with Czechoslovakia's Zbyněk Hubač jumping 76 meters. Yuriy Samsonov, jumping second, reached 88.5 meters to take the lead. Finland's Veikko Kankkonen, the 10th jumper, surpassed the construction point with a 91.5-meter jump. Arne Larsen, jumping 26th, jumped 90.5 meters but took the lead with a 0.3-point advantage due to higher style scores. Niilo Halonen, jumping 33rd, achieved the round's longest jump of 97.5 meters, matched only by Helmut Recknagel, who took the lead. The top five after the first round included Antoni Łaciak (96.5 m, third), Piotr Wala (94.5 m, fourth), and Willi Egger (94 m, fifth).

In the second round, 30 jumpers reached or exceeded the construction point. Helmut Recknagel led with a 103-meter jump, the only one exceeding 100 meters, widening his lead. Nikolay Kamenskiy and Veit Kührt both jumped 97 meters, moving to third and eighth, respectively. Willi Egger and Max Bolkart reached 96.5 meters, while Toralf Engan, Peter Lesser, and Veikko Kankkonen hit 95 meters. Recknagel maintained his lead, followed by Niilo Halonen and Nikolay Kamenskiy.

In the final round, 21 jumpers reached at least 90 meters, with Peter Lesser (102 m) and Toralf Engan (100 m) exceeding 100 meters. Despite these distances, Helmut Recknagel won gold with a 98.5-meter jump and the highest style scores. Nikolay Kamenskiy jumped 97 meters, securing silver, while Niilo Halonen landed at 93.5 meters for bronze.

== Results ==
=== Individual competition on K-65 Hill (21 February 1962) ===
Rank	Start No.	Athlete	Nation	Jump 1	Score	Jump 2	Score	Jump 3	Score	Total score
1	59	Toralf Engan	Norway	68.0	113.5	67.0	106.7	70.5	110.1	223.6
2	57	Antoni Łaciak	Poland	68.5	112.5	64.5	101.4	71.5	110.0	222.5
3	53	Helmut Recknagel	East Germany	65.5	107.3	67.0	107.2	71.5	112.5	219.8
4	26	Hemmo Silvennoinen	Finland	64.5	105.0	69.0	112.5	69.0	106.4	218.9
5	63	Koba Zakadze	Soviet Union	65.5	107.8	65.0	103.7	71.5	111.0	218.8
6	40	Veit Kührt	East Germany	64.0	94.7	69.0	109.5	69.5	108.3	217.8
7	25	Gustaw Bujok	Poland	64.5	68.5	67.5	106.6	71.0	107.5	214.1
8	12	Nikolay Kamenskiy	Soviet Union	65.0	104.4	68.5	109.5	66.0	100.0	213.9
9	48	Nikolai Schamov	Soviet Union	65.5	106.8	66.0	103.4	69.5	106.3	213.1
10	56	Wilhelm Egger	Austria	67.0	107.0	66.5	105.8	64.5	95.6	212.8
11	27	Kurt Schramm	East Germany	65.5	103.8	67.5	107.6	69.5	104.8	212.4
12	61	Eino Kirjonen	Finland	61.5	98.7	65.5	103.5	68.5	105.5	209.0
13	17	Torgeir Brandtzæg	Norway	61.5	95.2	68.0	109.0	65.5	99.7	208.7
14	58	Bruno De Zordo	Italy	61.0	96.9	67.0	108.2	65.5	99.2	207.4
15	34	Otto Leodolter	Austria	63.0	102.6	65.5	103.5	64.5	97.1	206.1
16	39	William Erickson	United States	63.0	98.6	66.0	103.4	67.5	99.4	202.8
17	55	Ueli Scheidegger	Switzerland	66.5	102.1	65.0	99.7	64.0	90.3	201.8
18	7	Antero Immonen	Finland	64.0	102.2	64.5	99.4	64.0	95.3	201.6
19	45	Dino De Zordo	Italy	64.5	101.5	62.0	94.4	66.5	99.3	200.8
20	3	Rudolf Doubek	Czechoslovakia	64.5	101.5	64.5	98.9	59.0	83.1	200.4
21	62	Takashi Matsui	Japan	62.5	100.3	62.5	96.7	66.5	99.8	200.1
22	11	Rikio Yoshida	Japan	62.0	100.0	65.0	99.7	58.5	83.4	199.7
23	23	Dalibor Motejlek	Czechoslovakia	63.5	98.4	65.5	101.0	62.0	88.8	199.4
24	51	Miroslav Martinák	Czechoslovakia	65.0	102.4	62.0	89.9	66.0	97.0	192.3
25	14	Ludvik Zajc	Yugoslavia	64.5	101.0	64.5	97.9	64.0	95.3	198.9
26	37	Arne Dalslåen	Norway	64.0	101.2	64.0	97.6	65.5	97.7	198.8
27	28	Marjan Pečar	Yugoslavia	66.0	100.2	64.5	98.4	66.0	97.5	198.6
28	9	Nilo Zandanel	Italy	62.5	99.3	62.5	98.2	57.5	81.0	197.5
29	6	Willi Wirth	East Germany	61.5	96.7	64.0	98.6	62.0	92.3	195.3
30	60	Max Bolkart	West Germany	58.0	88.3	67.0	106.7	71.0	81.0	195.0
31	42	Jože Šlibar	Yugoslavia	62.0	95.5	63.0	99.1	63.0	89.7	194.6
32	30	Naoki Shimura	Japan	65.0	105.4	65.5	74.0	61.0	88.9	194.3
32	52	Lars-Åke Bergseije	Sweden	61.0	93.4	64.5	100.9	64.5	65.6	194.3
34	36	Veikko Kankkonen	Finland	67.0	88.5	67.0	105.7	67.0	73.1	194.2
35	43	Piotr Wala	Poland	68.5	85.0	64.5	70.9	70.5	107.1	192.1
36	15	Józef Gąsienica-Bryjak	Poland	60.5	92.6	64.5	99.4	60.0	85.5	192.0
37	5	Arnfinn Malm	Norway	61.0	93.4	63.0	98.5	54.0	78.7	191.9
38	21	Yuriy Samsonov	Soviet Union	61.5	96.2	64.0	95.1	64.0	93.3	191.3
39	24	Giacomo Aimoni	Italy	60.0	62.3	62.0	94.9	65.0	95.9	190.8
40	54	Miro Oman	Yugoslavia	59.5	89.5	60.5	90.5	66.0	100.0	190.5
41	35	Kjell Sjöberg	Sweden	59.5	93.0	62.5	96.7	62.0	93.3	190.0
42	44	Claude Jean-Prost	France	63.0	100.1	59.0	86.3	62.5	89.0	189.1
43	18	Helmut Kurz	West Germany	61.0	92.4	62.0	95.9	62.5	92.5	188.4
44	38	Heinz Ihle	West Germany	58.5	88.0	66.5	100.3	66.0	67.5	188.3
45	22	Peter Müller	Austria	59.5	87.5	60.5	92.5	63.0	93.7	186.2
46	20	Gösta Nordin	Sweden	59.0	90.7	62.0	94.9	60.0	86.5	185.6
47	41	Zbyněk Hubač	Czechoslovakia	59.5	92.0	60.0	91.7	64.0	67.3	183.7
48	31	Régis Rey	France	61.0	90.4	63.0	93.0	63.0	88.2	183.4
49	19	Stephan R. Rieschl	United States	56.5	82.3	63.5	96.8	62.0	86.3	183.1
50	47	Shigeyuki Wakasa	Japan	64.5	75.0	63.0	64.5	69.5	106.3	181.3
51	49	Gerry Gravelle	Canada	56.0	82.5	60.5	89.5	62.5	90.0	179.5
52	4	Endre Kiss	Hungary	60.0	90.8	60.5	88.5	56.0	77.1	179.3
53	13	John H. Elliot	United States	60.0	90.8	60.0	88.2	57.0	74.8	359.0
54	46	Toni Cecchinato	Switzerland	60.5	68.1	59.5	89.0	63.0	88.2	177.2
55	8	Holger Karlsson	Sweden	54.0	80.2	59.0	87.8	60.0	88.0	175.8
56	10	Frank Gartrell	Canada	61.0	54.9	64.0	91.6	60.0	80.0	171.6
57	2	Gerhard Niederhammer	Austria	55.0	82.1	58.5	87.1	57.0	80.8	169.2
58	33	Kaare Lien	Canada	63.0	70.3	57.5	83.7	60.0	81.0	164.7
59	1	Alois Haberstock	West Germany	61.0	88.4	62.0	58.9	56.0	76.1	164.5
60	50	John Balfanz	United States	61.5	65.7	60.0	57.7	65.5	94.7	164.5
61	32	László Csávás	Hungary	54.0	78.7	55.0	79.2	54.5	75.3	157.9
62	29	László Gellér	Hungary	51.5	41.5	53.0	74.1	53.5	72.6	146.7

=== Individual competition on K-90 Hill (25 February 1962) ===
Rank	Start No.	Athlete	Nation	Jump 1	Score	Jump 2	Score	Jump 3	Score	Total score
1	55	Helmut Recknagel	East Germany	97.5	117.4	103.0	124.0	98.5	116.3	241.4
2	16	Nikolay Kamenskiy	Soviet Union	91.0	104.6	97.0	114.1	97.0	112.3	226.4
3	33	Niilo Halonen	Finland	97.5	116.4	94.0	107.9	93.5	108.1	224.5
4	63	Toralf Engan	Norway	92.5	104.4	95.0	108.6	100.0	114.9	223.5
5	14	Peter Lesser	East Germany	90.5	69.0	95.0	108.1	102.0	115.2	223.3
6	58	Antoni Łaciak	Poland	96.5	115.0	94.0	102.9	94.5	107.3	222.3
7	56	Wilhelm Egger	Austria	94.0	108.7	96.5	109.9	84.5	59.4	218.6
8	44	Piotr Wala	Poland	94.5	110.3	94.5	102.4	95.5	107.5	217.8
9	53	Max Bolkart	West Germany	91.0	105.1	96.5	110.9	91.5	103.7	216.0
10	10	Veikko Kankkonen	Finland	91.5	105.2	95.0	110.1	91.5	101.7	215.3
11	47	Wolfgang Happle	West Germany	94.0	106.7	94.0	103.4	97.5	107.9	214.6
12	48	Veit Kührt	East Germany	94.5	105.3	97.0	109.1	DNS	0.0	214.4
13	49	Koba Zakadze	Soviet Union	93.0	107.5	92.0	106.5	90.5	101.5	214.0
14	40	Nikolai Schamov	Soviet Union	90.0	105.4	93.5	108.3	89.0	100.9	213.7
15	30	Kurt Schramm	East Germany	90.5	101.0	94.5	106.5	94.5	105.8	212.3
16	34	Otto Leodolter	Austria	92.0	107.3	91.5	103.9	89.5	100.4	211.2
17	23	Peter Müller	Austria	89.5	101.3	94.5	108.5	90.5	101.0	209.8
18	41	Shigeyuki Wakasa	Japan	90.5	106.0	89.5	102.0	84.5	90.9	208.0
19	26	Arne Larsen	Norway	90.5	105.5	89.5	101.0	88.5	97.9	206.5
20	35	Miroslav Martinák	Czechoslovakia	89.0	101.7	92.0	104.5	80.5	84.9	206.2
21	21	Eino Kirjonen	Finland	87.5	103.4	85.5	98.4	89.5	101.4	204.8
22	59	Ueli Scheidegger	Switzerland	94.5	105.8	90.0	98.1	90.5	93.5	203.9
23	61	Hemmo Silvennoinen	Finland	85.5	98.9	90.0	101.6	90.5	102.0	203.6
24	50	Lars-Åke Bergseije	Sweden	90.0	100.4	91.5	102.4	85.5	92.4	202.8
25	2	Yuriy Samsonov	Soviet Union	88.5	100.6	90.5	101.7	90.0	65.9	202.3
26	28	Gustaw Bujok	Poland	91.0	102.6	90.5	99.7	90.5	97.5	202.3
27	36	Dino De Zordo	Italy	87.5	96.9	91.5	103.4	90.5	98.0	201.4
28	37	Gösta Nordin	Sweden	87.5	97.4	91.5	101.9	89.5	98.4	200.3
29	62	Takashi Matsui	Japan	89.5	100.8	90.5	98.7	85.5	95.4	199.5
30	29	Yōsuke Etō	Japan	86.5	99.4	87.5	99.9	91.0	90.9	199.3
31	4	Nilo Zandanel	Italy	81.0	90.4	88.0	97.4	91.5	100.2	197.6
32	31	John Balfanz	United States	87.0	97.4	89.5	99.5	87.0	93.9	196.9
33	11	Helmut Kurz	West Germany	86.5	99.4	87.5	97.4	86.0	62.9	196.8
34	43	Torgeir Brandtzæg	Norway	87.5	96.4	91.0	100.3	85.0	94.4	196.7
35	6	Miro Oman	Yugoslavia	78.5	85.9	89.5	97.5	90.5	99.0	196.5
36	5	Arne Dalslåen	Norway	85.0	96.9	89.5	99.5	85.5	93.4	196.4
37	38	John H. Elliot	United States	87.0	96.4	89.0	97.4	89.5	98.4	195.8
38	46	Ludvik Zajc	Yugoslavia	89.5	98.8	90.5	96.2	89.0	96.8	195.6
39	51	Bruno De Zordo	Italy	90.0	100.4	79.0	53.4	85.5	93.9	194.3
40	52	William Erickson	United States	88.0	96.5	89.5	98.0	87.0	64.4	194.5
41	9	Stefan Przybyła	Poland	85.5	94.4	89.5	98.5	85.5	92.9	192.9
41	25	Heinz Ihle	West Germany	88.5	63.6	89.0	97.4	90.5	95.5	192.9
43	22	Giacomo Aimoni	Italy	85.5	93.4	86.5	91.9	89.5	96.9	190.3
44	15	Walter Habersatter	Austria	83.0	93.4	85.5	93.9	86.5	95.4	189.3
44	17	Kjell Sjöberg	Sweden	80.0	93.9	80.0	91.9	84.0	95.4	189.3
46	3	Naoki Shimura	Japan	84.0	95.4	84.0	92.9	85.0	91.9	188.3
47	54	Jože Šlibar	Yugoslavia	86.0	58.9	88.0	94.4	86.0	93.4	187.8
48	8	Holger Karlsson	Sweden	74.5	77.2	90.0	97.7	87.0	89.9	187.6
49	39	Toni Cecchinato	Switzerland	85.5	95.9	84.0	91.4	80.0	86.4	187.3
50	19	Frank Gartrell	Canada	82.5	86.4	91.0	94.8	87.0	88.9	183.7
51	45	Claude Jean-Prost	France	84.5	91.9	84.0	58.9	81.0	89.4	181.3
52	13	Stephan R. Rieschl	United States	84.0	57.4	85.0	89.4	85.5	90.9	180.3
53	1	Zbyněk Hubač	Czechoslovakia	76.0	83.9	85.0	90.9	85.5	85.9	176.8
53	18	Jaromír Nevlud	Czechoslovakia	80.5	89.4	75.0	81.9	79.0	87.4	176.8
55	42	Kaare Lien	Canada	80.0	84.4	80.0	83.4	84.5	89.9	174.3
56	20	Régis Rey	France	80.5	86.9	85.0	86.4	76.5	80.3	173.3
57	32	Endre Kiss	Hungary	83.0	86.4	79.0	83.4	77.5	79.6	169.8
58	7	László Gellér	Hungary	75.0	79.1	81.0	84.4	81.0	81.4	165.8
59	24	László Csávás	Hungary	73.0	75.5	75.0	78.9	76.0	78.4	157.3

== Falls ==
In the first round of the competition on the Średnia Krokiew, nine jumpers failed to land their jumps. Falls were recorded for: Frank Gartrell, Giacomo Aimoni, Gustaw Bujok, László Gellér, Veikko Kankkonen, Piotr Wala, Toni Cecchinato, Shigeyuki Wakasa, and John Balfanz. In the second round, five jumpers fell during their jumps: Alois Haberstock and Naoki Shimura, as well as Wala, Wakasa, and Balfanz again. In the final, third round, the following jumpers failed to land: Kankkonen once more, along with Heini Ihle, Zbyněk Hubač, and Max Bolkart. The high number of falls during the event on the Średnia Krokiew was caused by the wind, which changed direction and strength throughout the competition.

On 23 February, during a training session two days before the World Championship competition on the Wielka Krokiew hill, Gerry Gravelle suffered an injury. The Canadian fell on the landing slope, resulting in broken ribs, and had to be hospitalized. The injury prevented him from taking part in the main competition. In the event itself, 10 jumpers failed to land their jumps. In the first competition round, four jumpers fell: Peter Lesser, Heini Ihle, Jože Šlibar, and Stephan R. Rieschl. In the second round, Bruno De Zordo and Claude Jean-Prost failed to land, and in the third round – Willi Egger, Yuriy Samsonov, Helmut Kurz, and William Erickson.

== Record number of spectators ==
During the 1962 World Championship competition on the Wielka Krokiew, a record was set for the number of spectators gathered at the hill. A total of 125,000 spectators attended the event, marking the highest turnout in history.
