= Planica 1963 =

KOP ski fly week competition in 1963

Coordinates: 46°28′43″N 13°43′16″E

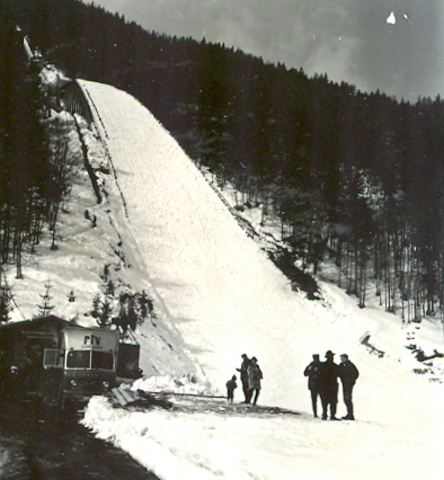
- Host city: Planica, SFR Yugoslavia
- Sport: Ski flying
- Events: K.O.P. Ski Flying Week
- Main venue: Bloudkova velikanka K120

Planica 1963 was international K.O.P. ski flying week competition, held from 22 to 24 March 1963 in Planica, SR Slovenia, SFR Yugoslavia. A total crowd of 65,000 spectators gathered over three days.

== Schedule ==
Date	Event	Rounds	Longest jump of the day	Visitors
17 March 1960	Domestic training K120 (Yugoslavian team only)	N/A	115 metres (377 ft) by Peter Eržen	—
20 March 1960	Unofficial training K80	N/A	distances not measured	—
21 March 1960	Free training K80	N/A	distances not measured	—
22 March 1960	International event: day 1 (K120)	3	120 metres (394 ft) by Torgeir Brandtzæg	10,000
23 March 1960	International event: day 2 (K120)	3	120 metres (394 ft) by Jože Langus	15,000
24 March 1960	International event: day 3 (K120)	3	121 metres (397 ft) by Dieter Bokeloh	40,000

== Competitions ==
On 17 March 1963, technical inspection of hill was on schedule, and training for domestic (Yugoslavian) national team only with 40 jumps in total. Peter Eržen was the longest at 115 metres.

On 20 March 1963, first national teams arrived in early afternoon, joined by few others later that day. First unofficial training on Srednja Bloudkova K80 normal hill was on schedule, with distances not being measured as this was unofficial event. Only three countries were present at training Hungary, Soviet Union and East Germany. American director Warren Miller, well known for ski movies, announced his arrival to shoot in Planica, Bled and Elan (ski production process).

On 21 March 1963, there were total eleven national team who already arrived in Planica, waiting only for the last to come West Germany. Due to heavy snow hill had to be prepared. Free training with few rounds was on schedule, but distances were not measured.

On 22 March 1963, first day of K.O.P. (Kulm-Oberstdorf-Planica) international ski flying week was on schedule in front of 10,000 people. Torgeir Brandtzæg took lead after first day with 108 and 120 metres, which was also the longest jump of the day.

On 23 March 1963, second day of K.O.P. international ski flying week was on schedule in front of 15,000 people. Dieter Bokeloh won second day, but Jože Langus (trial jumper) set longest jump of the day at 120 metres.

On 24 March 1963, third and final day of K.O.P. international ski flying week was on schedule in front of record 40,000 people and president Josip Broz Tito. Very happy Dieter Bokeloh won three day international competition with total of 463.6 points.

=== K.O.P. International Ski Flying Week: Day 1 ===
22 March 1963 – Bloudkova velikanka K120 – Three rounds (2 best counting)

Rank	Bib	Name	Country	Round 1	Round 2	Points
1	N/A	Torgeir Brandtzæg	Norway	120 m	108 m	239.5
2	N/A	Veit Kührt	East Germany	110 m	109 m	228.3
3	N/A	Helmut Recknagel	East Germany	113 m	102 m	222.3
4	N/A	Dieter Bokeloh	East Germany	110 m	111 m	221.7
5	N/A	Georg Thoma	West Germany	104 m	109 m	220.7
6	N/A	Herbert Schiffner	Austria	108 m	103 m	208.3
7	N/A	Klemm	East Germany	106 m	98 m	197.2
8	N/A	Pekka Tirkkonen	Finland	94 m	100 m	196.5
9	N/A	Halvor Næs	Norway	92 m	97 m	190.0
10	N/A	Nikolai Schamov	Soviet Union	99 m	91 m	189.5
11	N/A	Józef Przybyła	Poland	96 m	95 m	188.2
12	N/A	Ludvik Zajc	Yugoslavia	96 m	95 m	187.3
13	N/A	Vladimir Palcevski	Soviet Union	101 m	93 m	184.2
14	N/A	Giacomo Aimoni	Italy	93 m	95 m	184.1
15	N/A	Holger Karlsson	Sweden	93 m	97 m	183.8
18	N/A	Peter Eržen	Yugoslavia	97 m	91 m	179.3
19	N/A	Jemc	Yugoslavia	81 m	92 m	171.3
25	N/A	Marjan Pečar	Yugoslavia	92 m	86 m	166.5
31	N/A	Miro Oman	Yugoslavia	79 m	85 m	158.5
36	N/A	Andrej Nahtigal	Yugoslavia	76 m	77 m	150.9
38	N/A	Bine Rogelj	Yugoslavia	79 m	72 m	135.3
39	N/A	Oto Giacomelli	Yugoslavia	82 m	72 m	98.2
N/A	N/A	Max Golser	Austria	N/A	N/A	N/A
N/A	N/A	Peter Lesser	East Germany	N/A	N/A	N/A
N/A	N/A	Heini Ihle	West Germany	N/A	N/A	N/A
N/A	N/A	Wolfgang Happle	West Germany	N/A	N/A	N/A
N/A	N/A	Ulf Norberg	Sweden	N/A	N/A	N/A
N/A	N/A	Peter Müller	Austria	N/A	N/A	N/A
N/A	N/A	Andrzej Sztolf	Poland	N/A	N/A	N/A
N/A	N/A	Tamás Sudár	Hungary	N/A	N/A	N/A
N/A	N/A	Alfred Lesser	East Germany	N/A	N/A	N/A
N/A	N/A	Koba Zakadze	Soviet Union	N/A	N/A	N/A
N/A	N/A	Sepp Lichtenegger	Austria	N/A	N/A	N/A
N/A	N/A	Rudolf Doubek	Czechoslovakia	N/A	N/A	N/A
N/A	N/A	Pekka Yli-Niemi	Finland	N/A	N/A	N/A
N/A	N/A	Dino De Zordo	Italy	N/A	N/A	N/A
N/A	N/A	László Csávás	Hungary	N/A	N/A	N/A
N/A	N/A	Jiří Raška	Czechoslovakia	N/A	N/A	N/A
N/A	N/A	Gustav Bujok	Poland	N/A	N/A	N/A
N/A	N/A	Endre Kiss	Hungary	N/A	N/A	N/A
N/A	N/A	Jože Šlibar	Yugoslavia	N/A	N/A	N/A
N/A	N/A	Josef Matouš	Czechoslovakia	N/A	N/A	N/A
N/A	N/A	Waldemar Heigenhauser	Austria	N/A	N/A	N/A

=== K.O.P. International Ski Flying Week: Day 2 ===
23 March 1963 – Bloudkova velikanka K120 – Three rounds (2 best counting)

Rank	Bib	Name	Country	Round 1	Round 2	Points
1	19	Dieter Bokeloh	East Germany	117 m	106 m	227.9
2	38	Veit Kührt	East Germany	105 m	107 m	223.6
3	34	Helmut Recknagel	East Germany	103 m	101 m	215.2
4	18	Klemm	East Germany	98 m	113 m	208.3
5	29	Torgeir Brandtzæg	Norway	99 m	98 m	204.3
6	15	Vladimir Palcevski	Soviet Union	98 m	101 m	201.1
7	39	Max Golser	Austria	101 m	100 m	200.5
8	2	Peter Lesser	East Germany	101 m	96 m	197.1
9	28	Georg Thoma	West Germany	98 m	99 m	195.8
10	17	Heini Ihle	West Germany	101 m	115 m	195.5
11	30	Peter Eržen	Yugoslavia	97 m	100 m	194.4
12	41	Nikolai Schamov	Soviet Union	99 m	94 m	190.3
13	22	Halvor Næs	Norway	95 m	99 m	189.3
14	43	Józef Przybyła	Poland	101 m	97 m	188.9
15	9	Wolfgang Happle	West Germany	101 m	92 m	188.5
16	36	Pekka Tirkkonen	Finland	119 m	94 m	188.4
17	21	Marjan Pečar	Yugoslavia	96 m	98 m	187.1
18	31	Holger Karlsson	Sweden	93 m	97 m	184.5
19	20	Ludvik Zajc	Yugoslavia	99 m	92 m	184.0
20	16	Ulf Norberg	Sweden	87 m	102 m	183.7
26	33	Jemc	Yugoslavia	93 m	86 m	172.8
36	13	Miro Oman	Yugoslavia	81 m	86 m	149.1
38	4	Andrej Nahtigal	Yugoslavia	75 m	78 m	139.3
39	12	Bine Rogelj	Yugoslavia	74 m	75 m	131.1
40	37	Giacomo Aimoni	Italy	75 m	74 m	126.9
N/A	1	Peter Müller	Austria	N/A	N/A	N/A
N/A	3	Andrzej Sztolf	Poland	N/A	N/A	N/A
N/A	5	Tamás Sudár	Hungary	N/A	N/A	N/A
N/A	6	Oto Giacomelli	Yugoslavia	N/A	N/A	N/A
N/A	7	Alfred Lesser	East Germany	N/A	N/A	N/A
N/A	8	Koba Zakadze	Soviet Union	N/A	N/A	N/A
N/A	10	Sepp Lichtenegger	Austria	N/A	N/A	N/A
N/A	11	Rudolf Doubek	Czechoslovakia	N/A	N/A	N/A
N/A	14	Herbert Schiffner	Austria	N/A	N/A	N/A
N/A	23	Dino De Zordo	Italy	N/A	N/A	N/A
N/A	24	Pekka Yli-Niemi	Finland	N/A	N/A	N/A
N/A	25	László Csávás	Hungary	N/A	N/A	N/A
N/A	26	Jiří Raška	Czechoslovakia	N/A	N/A	N/A
N/A	27	Gustav Bujok	Poland	N/A	N/A	N/A
N/A	32	Endre Kiss	Yugoslavia	N/A	N/A	N/A
N/A	35	Jože Šlibar	Yugoslavia	N/A	N/A	N/A
N/A	40	Josef Matouš	Czechoslovakia	N/A	N/A	N/A
N/A	42	Waldemar Heigenhauser	Austria	N/A	N/A	N/A

=== K.O.P. International Ski Flying Week: Day 3 ===
24 March 1963 – Bloudkova velikanka K120 – Three rounds (2 best counting)

Rank	Bib	Name	Country	Round 1	Round 2	Points
1	20	Dieter Bokeloh	East Germany	113 m	121 m	235.7
2	21	Klemm	East Germany	100 m	109 m	207.2
3	41	Veit Kührt	East Germany	111 m	116 m	226.7
4	33	Helmut Recknagel	East Germany	107 m	102 m	207.2
5	24	Józef Przybyła	Poland	105 m	108 m	206.2
6	5	Alfred Lesser	East Germany	109 m	100 m	203.6
7	30	Torgeir Brandtzæg	Norway	100 m	111 m	203.5
8	37	Josef Matouš	Czechoslovakia	106 m	103 m	202.0
9	40	Giacomo Aimoni	Italy	101 m	101 m	201.2
10	10	Wolfgang Happle	West Germany	106 m	104 m	198.4
11	32	Georg Thoma	West Germany	96 m	107 m	197.2
12	42	Holger Karlsson	Sweden	97 m	109 m	194.7
13	17	Ulf Norberg	Sweden	102 m	98 m	193.7
14	7	Koba Zakadze	Soviet Union	97 m	97 m	193.5
	29	Nikolai Schamov	Soviet Union	99 m	94 m	193.5
16	27	Vladimir Palcevski	Soviet Union	98 m	99 m	192.2
17	36	Herbert Schiffner	Austria	100 m	94 m	190.2
18	43	Pekka Tirkkonen	Finland	90 m	108 m	190.0
19	9	Peter Lesser	East Germany	98 m	105 m	197.2
20	6	Peter Müller	Austria	93 m	101 m	185.7
21	23	Halvor Næs	Norway	94 m	99 m	185.2
22	35	Marjan Pečar	Yugoslavia	89 m	101 m	177.7
23	19	Jiří Raška	Czechoslovakia	96 m	101 m	177.2
24	15	Waldemar Heigenhauser	Austria	85 m	100 m	176.9
25	26	Ludvik Zajc	Yugoslavia	91 m	96 m	176.8
26	12	Andrzej Sztolf	Poland	86 m	96 m	171.2
27	38	Max Golser	Austria	97 m	110 m	167.3
28	11	Rudolf Doubek	Czechoslovakia	87 m	91 m	165.6
29	18	László Csávás	Hungary	83 m	87 m	160.2
30	28	Jemc	Yugoslavia	88 m	88 m	160.0
31	25	Peter Eržen	Yugoslavia	93 m	100 m	159.3
32	16	Pekka Yli-Niemi	Finland	81 m	93 m	157.9
33	3	Oto Giacomelli	Yugoslavia	83 m	83 m	145.0
34	2	Sepp Lichtenegger	Austria	84 m	81 m	142.7
35	4	Andrej Nahtigal	Yugoslavia	79 m	79 m	138.5
36	1	Tamás Sudár	Hungary	80 m	81 m	138.0
37	8	Bine Rogelj	Yugoslavia	79 m	77 m	136.9
38	13	Miro Oman	Yugoslavia	76 m	72 m	122.0
N/A	14	Dino De Zordo	Italy	N/A	N/A	N/A
N/A	22	Heini Ihle	West Germany	N/A	N/A	N/A
N/A	31	Gustav Bujok	Poland	N/A	N/A	N/A
N/A	34	Endre Kiss	Yugoslavia	N/A	N/A	N/A
N/A	39	Jože Šlibar	Yugoslavia	N/A	N/A	N/A

Fall or touch!

== Official results ==
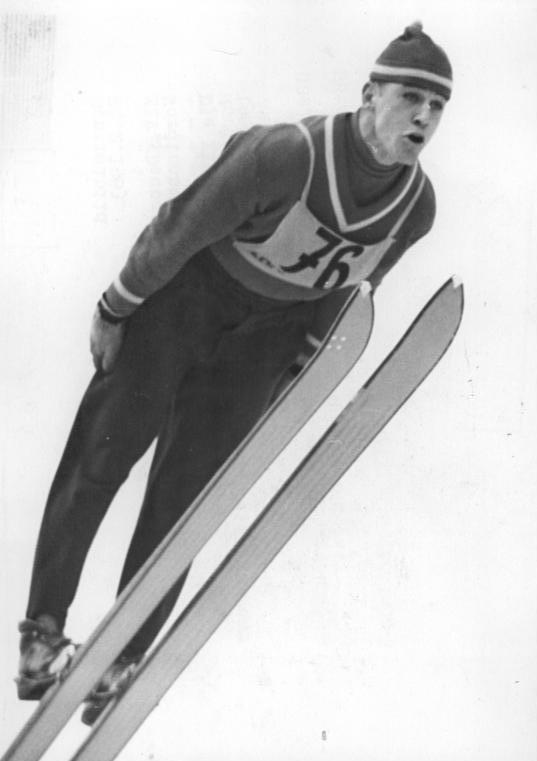
Dieter Bokeloh won Planica three day international ski flying week competition

22-24 March 1963 – Bloudkova velikanka K120 – Four rounds

Rank	Name	Country	Points
1	Dieter Bokeloh	East Germany	463.6
2	Klemm	East Germany	435.0
3	Veit Kührt	East Germany	430.8
4	Helmut Recknagel	East Germany	422.4
5	Torgeir Brandtzæg	Norway	407.8
6	Józef Przybyła	Poland	395.1
7	Vladimir Palcevski	Soviet Union	393.3
8	Georg Thoma	West Germany	393.0
9	Wolfgang Happle	West Germany	386.9
10	Peter Lesser	East Germany	384.3
11	Nikolai Schamov	Soviet Union	383.5
12	Holger Karlsson	Sweden	379.2
	Alfred Lesser	East Germany	379.2
14	Pekka Tirkkonen	Finland	378.4
15	Giacomo Aimoni	Italy	378.0
16	Ulf Norberg	Sweden	377.4
17	Halvor Næs	Norway	374.5
18	Max Golser	Austria	367.8
19	Josef Matouš	Czechoslovakia	367.1
20	Koba Zakadze	Soviet Union	367.0
21	Marjan Pečar	Yugoslavia	364.8
22	Peter Müller	Austria	362.0
23	Ludvik Zajc	Yugoslavia	360.8
24	Herbert Schiffner	Austria	356.4
25	Peter Eržen	Yugoslavia	353.7
26	Waldemar Heigenhauser	Austria	348.2
27	Jiří Raška	Czechoslovakia	345.7
28	Andrzej Sztolf	Poland	338.0
29	Pekka Yli-Niemi	Finland	335.7
30	Jemc	Yugoslavia	332.8
31	Rudolf Doubek	Czechoslovakia	322.4
32	László Csávás	Hungary	313.6
33	Sepp Lichtenegger	Austria	286.2
34	Andrej Nahtigal	Yugoslavia	277.8
35	Oto Giacomelli	Yugoslavia	271.1
	Miro Oman	Yugoslavia	271.1
37	Bine Rogelj	Yugoslavia	268.0
38	Tamás Sudár	Hungary	262.9
N/A	Heini Ihle	West Germany	N/A
N/A	Dino De Zordo	Italy	N/A
N/A	Gustav Bujok	Poland	N/A
N/A	Endre Kiss	Hungary	N/A
N/A	Jože Šlibar	Yugoslavia	N/A

== Team ==
In memory of Stanko Bloudek (1890–1959).

=== Stanko Bloudek Memorial II ===
Rank	Country	Points	Total
1	East Germany Dieter Bokeloh; Klemm	463.6; 455.0	898.6
2	Norway Torgeir Brandtzæg; Halvor Næs	407.8; 374.5	782.3
3	West Germany Georg Thoma; Wolfgang Happle	393.0; 386.9	779.9
4	Soviet Union Vladimir Palcevski; Nikolai Schamov	393.5; 385.5	779.0
5	Sweden Holger Karlsson; Ulf Norberg	379.2; 377.4	756.6
6	Poland Józef Przybyła; Andrzej Sztolf	395.1; 338.0	733.1
7	Austria Max Golser; Peter Müller	367.8; 362.0	729.8
8	Yugoslavia Marjan Pečar; Ludvik Zajc	364.8; 360.8	725.6
9	Finland Pekka Tirkkonen; Pekka Yli-Niemi	378.4; 335.7	714.1
10	Czechoslovakia Josef Matouš; Jiří Raška	367.1; 345.7	712.8
11	Hungary László Csávás; Tamás Sudár	313.6; 262.9	576.5
