= Finland at the 1964 Winter Olympics =

- IOC code: FIN
- NOC: Finnish Olympic Committee
- Website: sport.fi/olympiakomitea (in Finnish and Swedish)

in Innsbruck
- Competitors: 52 (46 men, 6 women) in 7 sports
- Flag bearers: Veikko Hakulinen, cross-country skiing
- Medals Ranked 4th: Gold 3 Silver 4 Bronze 3 Total 10

Winter Olympics appearances (overview)
- 1924; 1928; 1932; 1936; 1948; 1952; 1956; 1960; 1964; 1968; 1972; 1976; 1980; 1984; 1988; 1992; 1994; 1998; 2002; 2006; 2010; 2014; 2018; 2022; 2026

Finland competed at the 1964 Winter Olympics in Innsbruck, Austria.

== Medalists ==
Medal	Name	Sport	Event
Gold	Eero Mäntyranta	Cross-country skiing	Men's 15 km
Gold	Eero Mäntyranta	Cross-country skiing	Men's 30 km (mass start)
Gold	Veikko Kankkonen	Ski jumping	Men's normal hill (K90 individual 70m)
Silver	Väinö Huhtala; Kalevi Laurila; Eero Mäntyranta; Arto Tiainen	Cross-country skiing	Men's 4 × 10 km relay
Silver	Mirja Lehtonen	Cross-country skiing	Women's 5 km
Silver	Veikko Kankkonen	Ski jumping	Men's large hill (K120 individual 90m)
Silver	Kaija Mustonen	Speed skating	Women's 1500m
Bronze	Arto Tiainen	Cross-country skiing	Men's 50 km
Bronze	Mirja Lehtonen; Senja Pusula; Toini Pöysti	Cross-country skiing	Women's 3 x 5 km relay
Bronze	Kaija Mustonen	Speed skating	Women's 1000m

== Alpine skiing ==
Men

Athlete	Event	Race	
Athlete	Event	Time	Rank
Ulf Ekstam	Downhill	2:27.31	26
Raimo Manninen	Downhill	2:23.94	22
Ulf Ekstam	Giant Slalom	2:01.78	36
Raimo Manninen	Giant Slalom	1:55.05	17

Men's slalom

Athlete	Qualifying				Final					
Athlete	Time 1	Rank	Time 2	Rank	Time 1	Rank	Time 2	Rank	Total	Rank
Ulf Ekstam	57.11	36	58.48	20 QF	DSQ	–	–	–	DSQ	–
Raimo Manninen	56.33	32	55.41	5 QF	1:14.82	22	1:05.45	22	2:20.27	22

== Biathlon ==
Men

Event	Athlete	Time	Misses	Adjusted time ^{1}	Rank
20 km	Esko Marttinen	1'24:50.2	5	1'34:50.2	23
20 km	Veikko Hakulinen	1'19:37.9	6	1'31:37.9	15
20 km	Antti Tyrväinen	1'22:09.0	4	1'30:09.0	13
20 km	Hannu Posti	1'25:16.5	1	1'27:16.5	8

^{1} Two minutes added per miss.

== Cross-country skiing ==
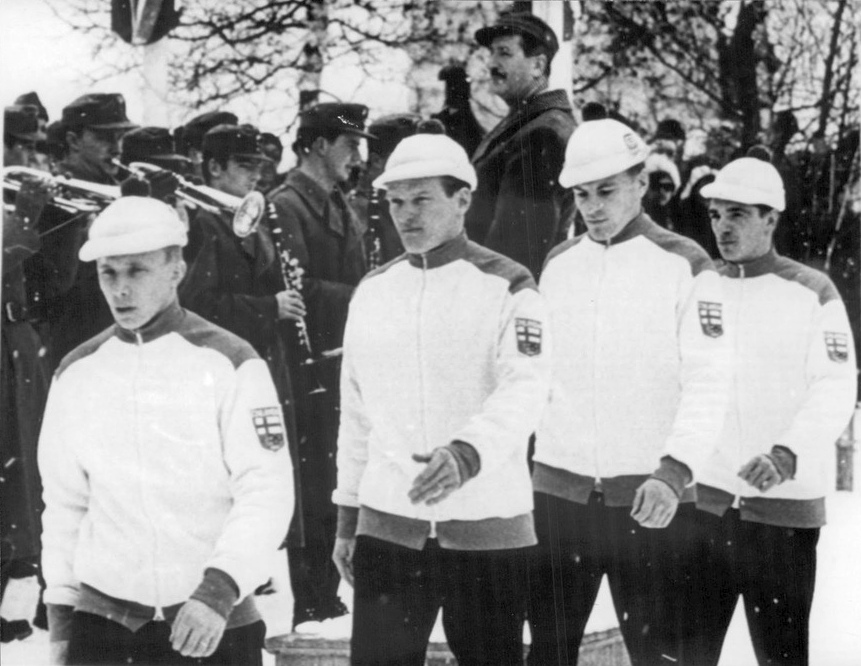
Mens 4 × 10 km cross country race, Finnish team

Men

Event	Athlete	Race	
Event	Athlete	Time	Rank
15 km	Eino Huhtala	52:18.2	11
15 km	Kalevi Laurila	51:59.8	9
15 km	Väinö Huhtala	51:45.4	4
15 km	Eero Mäntyranta	50.54.1	1st place, gold medalist(s)
30 km	Väinö Huhtala	1'33:38.1	14
30 km	Arto Tiainen	1'33:37.7	13
30 km	Kalevi Laurila	1'32:41.4	6
30 km	Eero Mäntyranta	1'30:50.7	1st place, gold medalist(s)
50 km	Kalevi Hämäläinen	2'52:22.3	16
50 km	Lauri Bergqvist	2'52:08.0	15
50 km	Eero Mäntyranta	2'47:47.1	9
50 km	Arto Tiainen	2'45:30.4	3rd place, bronze medalist(s)

Men's 4 × 10 km relay

Athletes	Race	
Athletes	Time	Rank
Väinö Huhtala; Arto Tiainen; Kalevi Laurila; Eero Mäntyranta	2'18:42.4	2nd place, silver medalist(s)

Women

Event	Athlete	Race	
Event	Athlete	Time	Rank
5 km	Senja Pusula	18:45.7	9
5 km	Eeva Ruoppa	18:29.8	8
5 km	Toini Pöysti	18:25.5	5
5 km	Mirja Lehtonen	17:52.9	2nd place, silver medalist(s)
10 km	Mirja Lehtonen	42:06.9	10
10 km	Eeva Ruoppa	41:58.1	9
10 km	Senja Pusula	41:17.8	6
10 km	Toini Pöysti	41:17.4	5

Women's 3 x 5 km relay

Athletes	Race	
Athletes	Time	Rank
Senja Pusula; Toini Pöysti; Mirja Lehtonen	1'02:45.1	3rd place, bronze medalist(s)

== Ice hockey ==
=== First round ===
Winners (in bold) qualified for the Group A to play for 1st-8th places. Teams, which lost their qualification matches, played in Group B for 9th-16th places.

Team 1	Score	Team 2
Austria	2–8	**Finland**

=== Medal round ===
Rank	Team	Pld	W	L	T	GF	GA	Pts
1	Soviet Union	7	7	0	0	54	10	14
2	Sweden	7	5	2	0	47	16	10
3	Czechoslovakia	7	5	2	0	38	19	10
4	Canada	7	5	2	0	32	17	10
5	United States	7	2	5	0	29	33	4
6	Finland	7	2	5	0	10	31	4
7	Germany	7	2	5	0	13	49	4
8	Switzerland	7	0	7	0	9	57	0

- Finland 4-0 Switzerland
- Czechoslovakia 4-0 Finland
- Sweden 7-0 Finland
- USSR 10-0 Finland
- Canada 6-2 Finland
- Finland 3-2 USA
- Germany (UTG) 2-1 Finland

**Contestants**; Raimo Kilpiö; Juhani Lahtinen; Rauno Lehtiö; Esko Luostarinen; Ilkka Mesikämmen; Seppo Nikkilä; Kalevi Numminen; Lasse Oksanen; Jorma Peltonen; Heino Pulli; Matti Reunamäki; Jouni Seistamo; Jorma Suokko; Juhani Wahlsten; Jarmo Wasama; Esko Kaonpää

== Nordic combined ==
Events:

- normal hill ski jumping (Three jumps, best two counted and shown here.)
- 15 km cross-country skiing

Athlete	Event	Ski Jumping				Cross-country			Total	
Athlete	Event	Distance 1	Distance 2	Points	Rank	Time	Points	Rank	Points	Rank
Raimo Partanen	Individual	59.0	53.0	156.6	29	54:15.9	191.78	16	348.38	26
Esa Klinga	Individual	62.5	52.0	173.1	26	55:22.4	179.49	20	352.59	25
Erkki Luiro	Individual	65.5	62.5	207.0	14	56:57.3	162.50	27	369.50	22
Raimo Majuri	Individual	67.0	59.5	192.7	19	55:44.5	175.52	21	368.22	23

== Ski jumping ==
Athletes performed three jumps, the best two were counted and are shown here.

Athlete	Event	Jump 1		Jump 2		Total	
Athlete	Event	Distance	Points	Distance	Points	Points	Rank
Antero Immonen	Normal hill	71.5	97.7	72.0	97.6	195.3	31
Veikko Kankkonen	Normal hill	80.0	115.9	79.0	114.0	229.9	1st place, gold medalist(s)
Niilo Halonen	Normal hill	75.5	102.8	74.5	100.6	203.4	14
Ensio Hyytiä	Normal hill	73.5	101.5	74.0	100.9	202.4	20
Ensio Hyytiä	Large hill	87.0	101.6	76.5	96.9	198.5	23
Antero Immonen	Large hill	86.0	98.9	80.0	95.9	194.8	31
Niilo Halonen	Large hill	88.0	105.8	83.0	100.0	205.8	14
Veikko Kankkonen	Large hill	95.5	118.9	90.5	110.0	228.9	2nd place, silver medalist(s)

== Speed skating ==
Men

Event	Athlete	Race	
Event	Athlete	Time	Rank
500 m	Toivo Salonen	42.2	23
500 m	Juhani Järvinen	41.9	19
500 m	Pekke Lattunen	41.8	16
500 m	Simo Rinne	41.4	10
1500 m	Seppo Hänninen	2:16.0	23
1500 m	Jouko Jokinen	2:15.6	19
1500 m	Juhani Järvinen	2:12.4	8
1500 m	Jouko Launonen	2:11.9	4
5000 m	Toivo Salonen	8:10.2	21
5000 m	Jouko Launonen	8:03.5	18
5000 m	Kalervo Hietala	7:58.8	15
10,000 m	Kalervo Hietala	17:12.9	26
10,000 m	Juhani Järvinen	17:05.0	20
10,000 m	Jouko Launonen	16:49.8	14

Women

Event	Athlete	Race	
Event	Athlete	Time	Rank
500 m	Kaija-Liisa Keskivitikka	48.8	16
500 m	Kaija Mustonen	48.0	13
1000 m	Kaija-Liisa Keskivitikka	1:37.6	8
1000 m	Kaija Mustonen	1:34.8	3rd place, bronze medalist(s)
1500 m	Kaija-Liisa Keskivitikka	2:30.0	8
1500 m	Kaija Mustonen	2:25.5	2nd place, silver medalist(s)
3000 m	Kaija-Liisa Keskivitikka	5:29.4	10
3000 m	Kaija Mustonen	5:24.3	5
