= Norway at the 1964 Winter Olympics =

- IOC code: NOR
- NOC: Norwegian Sports Federation

in Innsbruck
- Competitors: 58 (51 men, 7 women) in 9 sports
- Flag bearer: Knut Johannesen (Speed skating)
- Medals Ranked 3rd: Gold 3 Silver 6 Bronze 6 Total 15

Winter Olympics appearances (overview)
- 1924; 1928; 1932; 1936; 1948; 1952; 1956; 1960; 1964; 1968; 1972; 1976; 1980; 1984; 1988; 1992; 1994; 1998; 2002; 2006; 2010; 2014; 2018; 2022; 2026

Norway competed at the 1964 Winter Olympics in Innsbruck, Austria.

== Medalists ==
Medal	Name	Sport	Event
Gold	Tormod Knutsen	Nordic combined	Men's individual
Gold	Toralf Engan	Ski jumping	Men's large hill
Gold	Knut Johannesen	Speed skating	Men's 5000m
Silver	Harald Grønningen	Cross-country skiing	Men's 15 km
Silver	Harald Grønningen	Cross-country skiing	Men's 30 km
Silver	Toralf Engan	Ski jumping	Men's normal hill
Silver	Alv Gjestvang	Speed skating	Men's 500m
Silver	Per Ivar Moe	Speed skating	Men's 5000m
Silver	Fred Anton Maier	Speed skating	Men's 10,000m
Bronze	Olav Jordet	Biathlon	Men's 20 km
Bronze	Torgeir Brandtzæg	Ski jumping	Men's normal hill
Bronze	Torgeir Brandtzæg	Ski jumping	Men's large hill
Bronze	Villy Haugen	Speed skating	Men's 1500m
Bronze	Fred Anton Maier	Speed skating	Men's 5000m
Bronze	Knut Johannesen	Speed skating	Men's 10,000m

== Alpine skiing ==
Men

Athlete	Event	Race	
Athlete	Event	Time	Rank
Arild Holm	Downhill	2:31.32	38
Jon Terje Øverland	Downhill	2:29.74	32
Per Martin Sunde	Giant Slalom	1:56.77	23
Arild Holm	Giant Slalom	1:55.72	21
Jon Terje Øverland	Giant Slalom	1:55.51	20

Men's slalom

Athlete	Qualifying				Final					
Athlete	Time 1	Rank	Time 2	Rank	Time 1	Rank	Time 2	Rank	Total	Rank
Arild Holm	55.27	27	59.31	22 QF	1:21.14	38	1:08.77	32	2:29.91	35
Per Martin Sunde	55.24	26	55.03	4 QF	1:14.23	18	1:04.13	15	2:18.36	16
Jon Terje Øverland	54.90	20 QF	–	–	1:19.16	36	1:05.68	23	2:24.84	29

Women

Athlete	Event	Race 1		Race 2		Total	
Athlete	Event	Time	Rank	Time	Rank	Time	Rank
Dikke Eger-Bergmann	Downhill					2:05.10	36
Liv Jagge-Christiansen	Downhill					2:04.07	29
Dikke Eger-Bergmann	Giant Slalom					2:08.62	33
Liv Jagge-Christiansen	Giant Slalom					2:02.98	29
Astrid Sandvik	Giant Slalom					2:00.74	21
Astrid Sandvik	Slalom	DSQ	–	–	–	DSQ	–
Dikke Eger-Bergmann	Slalom	n/a	21	DNF	–	DNF	–
Liv Jagge-Christiansen	Slalom	47.67	17	48.71	6	1:36.38	7

== Biathlon ==
Men

Event	Athlete	Time	Misses	Adjusted time ^{1}	Rank
20 km	Ola Wærhaug	1'24:38.0	5	1'34:38.0	22
20 km	Jon Istad	1'23:24.8	3	1'29:24.8	11
20 km	Ragnar Tveiten	1'19:52.5	3	1'25:52.5	4
20 km	Olav Jordet	1'22:38.8	1	1'24:38.8	3rd place, bronze medalist(s)

^{1} Two minutes added per miss.

== Cross-country skiing ==
Men

Event	Athlete	Race	
Event	Athlete	Time	Rank
15 km	Ole Ellefsæter	55:10.8	25
15 km	Einar Østby	52:52.2	15
15 km	Magnar Lundemo	51:55.2	8
15 km	Harald Grønningen	51:34.8	2nd place, silver medalist(s)
30 km	Ole Ellefsæter	DSQ	–
30 km	Sverre Stensheim	1'33:12.3	11
30 km	Einar Østby	1'32:54.6	8
30 km	Harald Grønningen	1'32:02.3	2nd place, silver medalist(s)
50 km	Ole Ellefsæter	2'47:45.8	8
50 km	Einar Østby	2'47:20.6	7
50 km	Harald Grønningen	2'47:03.6	6
50 km	Sverre Stensheim	2'45:47.2	5

Men's 4 × 10 km relay

Athletes	Race	
Athletes	Time	Rank
Magnar Lundemo; Erling Steineide; Einar Østby; Harald Grønningen	2'19:11.9	4

Women

Event	Athlete	Race	
Event	Athlete	Time	Rank
5 km	Babben Enger	19:26.5	18
5 km	Ingrid Wigernæs	19:17.0	15
10 km	Babben Enger	48:43.8	31
10 km	Ingrid Wigernæs	43:38.0	12

== Figure skating ==
Women

Athlete	CF	FS	Points	Places	Rank
Berit Unn Johansen	30	29	1524.9	265	30
Anne Karin Dehle	24	30	1571.9	248	28

== Ice hockey ==
=== First round ===
Winners (in bold) qualified for the Group A to play for 1st-8th places. Teams, which lost their qualification matches, played in Group B for 9th-16th places.

Team 1	Score	Team 2
**Switzerland**	5–1	Norway

=== Consolation Round ===
Rank	Team	Pld	W	L	T	GF	GA	Pts
9	Poland	7	6	1	0	40	13	12
10	Norway	7	5	2	0	40	19	10
11	Japan	7	4	2	1	35	31	9
12	Romania	7	3	3	1	31	28	7
13	Austria	7	3	3	1	24	28	7
14	Yugoslavia	7	3	3	1	29	37	7
15	Italy	7	2	5	0	24	42	4
16	Hungary	7	0	7	0	14	39	0

- Japan 4-3 Norway
- Poland 4-2 Norway
- Norway 9-2 Italy
- Norway 5-1 Hungary
- Norway 4-2 Romania
- Austria 2-8 Norway
- Norway 8-4 Yugoslavia

**Contestants**; Egil Bjerklund; Olav Dalsøren; Bjørn Elvenes; Erik Fjeldstad; Tor Gundersen; Jan Erik Hansen; Svein Norman Hansen; Einar Bruno Larsen; Thor-Erik Lundby; Thor Martinsen; Øystein Mellerud; Kåre Østensen; Frank Olafsen; Per Skjerwen Olsen; Christian Petersen; Georg Smefjell; Jan Roar Thoresen

== Luge ==
Men

Athlete	Run 1		Run 2		Run 3		Run 4		Total	
Athlete	Time	Rank	Time	Rank	Time	Rank	Time	Rank	Time	Rank
Jan-Axel Strøm	55.78	22	55.27	18	55.15	21	55.78	21	3:41.98	19
Mogens Christensen	54.43	16	55.00	15	53.80	11	54.44	14	3:37.67	14
Rolf Greger Strøm	52.60	6	52.81	6	52.62	5	53.18	4	3:31.21	4

(Men's) Doubles

Athletes	Run 1		Run 2		Total	
Athletes	Time	Rank	Time	Rank	Time	Rank
Christian Hallén-Paulsen; Jan-Axel Strøm	52.52	8	55.30	11	1:47.82	10
Mogens Christensen; Rolf Greger Strøm	DNF	–	–	–	DNF	–

== Nordic combined ==
Events:

- normal hill ski jumping (Three jumps, best two counted and shown here.)
- 15 km cross-country skiing

Athlete	Event	Ski Jumping				Cross-country			Total	
Athlete	Event	Distance 1	Distance 2	Points	Rank	Time	Points	Rank	Points	Rank
Arne Barhaugen	Individual	64.0	60.0	191.3	20	50:40.4	234.33	2	425.63	6
Arne Larsen	Individual	64.0	64.5	198.3	17	50:49.6	232.33	3	430.63	5
Bjørn Wirkola	Individual	65.0	68.0	217.2	9	53:51.9	196.34	14	413.54	11
Tormod Knutsen	Individual	74.0	72.0	238.9	2	50:58.6	230.38	4	469.28	1st place, gold medalist(s)

== Ski jumping ==
Athletes performed three jumps, the best two were counted and are shown here.

Athlete	Event	Jump 1		Jump 2		Total	
Athlete	Event	Distance	Points	Distance	Points	Points	Rank
Torgeir Brandtzæg	Normal hill	79.0	112.6	78.0	110.3	222.9	3rd place, bronze medalist(s)
Torbjørn Yggeseth	Normal hill	73.5	99.0	77.0	104.4	203.4	14
Hans Olav Sørensen	Normal hill	76.0	106.0	74.5	102.6	208.6	8
Toralf Engan	Normal hill	78.5	112.3	79.0	114.0	226.3	2nd place, silver medalist(s)
Torbjørn Yggeseth	Large hill	85.0	96.2	82.0	98.8	195.5	28
Bjørn Wirkola	Large hill	85.0	99.2	85.0	104.9	204.1	16
Torgeir Brandtzæg	Large hill	90.0	113.2	87.0	114.0	227.2	3rd place, bronze medalist(s)
Toralf Engan	Large hill	93.5	114.7	90.5	116.0	230.7	1st place, gold medalist(s)

== Speed skating ==
Men

Event	Athlete	Race	
Event	Athlete	Time	Rank
500 m	Magne Thomassen	42.0	21
500 m	Hroar Elvenes	41.4	10
500 m	Villy Haugen	41.1	8
500 m	Alv Gjestvang	40.6	2nd place, silver medalist(s)
1500 m	Nils Aaness	2:14.6	16
1500 m	Magne Thomassen	2:12.5	9
1500 m	Ivar Eriksen	2:12.2	6
1500 m	Villy Haugen	2:11.2	3rd place, bronze medalist(s)
5000 m	Fred Anton Maier	7:42.0	3rd place, bronze medalist(s)
5000 m	Per Ivar Moe	7:38.6	2nd place, silver medalist(s)
5000 m	Knut Johannesen	7:38.4 OR	1st place, gold medalist(s)
10,000 m	Per Ivar Moe	16:47.1	13
10,000 m	Knut Johannesen	16:06.3	3rd place, bronze medalist(s)
10,000 m	Fred Anton Maier	16:06.0	2nd place, silver medalist(s)
