= Pyotr Kovalenko =

Soviet ski jumper

Personal information
- Nationality: Soviet
- Born: 10 October 1942; Sortavala, Russian SFSR, Soviet Union
- Died: 1993 (aged 50–51); Saint Petersburg, Russia

Sport
- Sport: Ski jumping

Pyotr Kovalenko (10 October 1942 – 1993) was a Soviet ski jumper. He competed in the normal hill and large hill events at the 1964 Winter Olympics.
