= John McInnes (ski jumper) =

Canadian ski jumper

Personal information
- Nationality: Canadian
- Born: 7 July 1939 (age 85); New Westminster, British Columbia, Canada

Sport
- Sport: Ski jumping

John McInnes (born 7 July 1939) is a Canadian ski jumper. He competed at the 1964 Winter Olympics and the 1968 Winter Olympics.

== Olympic results ==
1964 Winter Olympics

- Normal hill: 53rd

1968 Olympics

- Normal hill: 55th
- Large hill: 57th

Best normal hill jump: 83.4m, jump 3 – 1964

Best large hill jump: 61.8m, jump 2 – 1968
