= Kalervo Hietala =

Finnish speed skater

Personal information
- Nationality: Finnish
- Born: 24 February 1938 (age 87); Rovaniemi, Finland

Sport
- Sport: Speed skating

Kalervo Hietala (born 24 February 1938) is a Finnish speed skater. He competed in two events at the 1964 Winter Olympics.
