= Božo Jemc =

Slovenian ski jumper

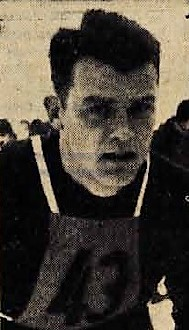
- Božo Jemc in 1964

Personal information
- Nationality: Slovenian
- Born: 10 March 1940; Bled, Yugoslavia
- Died: 8 March 1991 (aged 50)

Sport
- Sport: Ski jumping

Božo Jemc (10 March 1940 – 8 March 1991) was a Slovenian ski jumper. He competed in the normal hill and large hill events at the 1964 Winter Olympics.
