= Olle Martinsson =

Swedish ski jumper (1944–2021)

Personal information
- Nationality: Swedish
- Born: 21 March 1944; Malmberget, Sweden
- Died: 22 February 2021 (aged 76)

Sport
- Sport: Ski jumping

Olle Martinsson (21 March 1944 – 22 February 2021) was a Swedish ski jumper. He competed in the normal hill and large hill events at the 1964 Winter Olympics.
