= Naoki Shimura =

Japanese ski jumper

Personal information
- Nationality: Japanese
- Born: 27 November 1941 (age 83); Hokkaido, Japan

Sport
- Sport: Ski jumping

Naoki Shimura (born 27 November 1941) is a Japanese ski jumper. He competed in the normal hill and large hill events at the 1964 Winter Olympics.
