= Karl-Heinz Munk =

German ski jumper

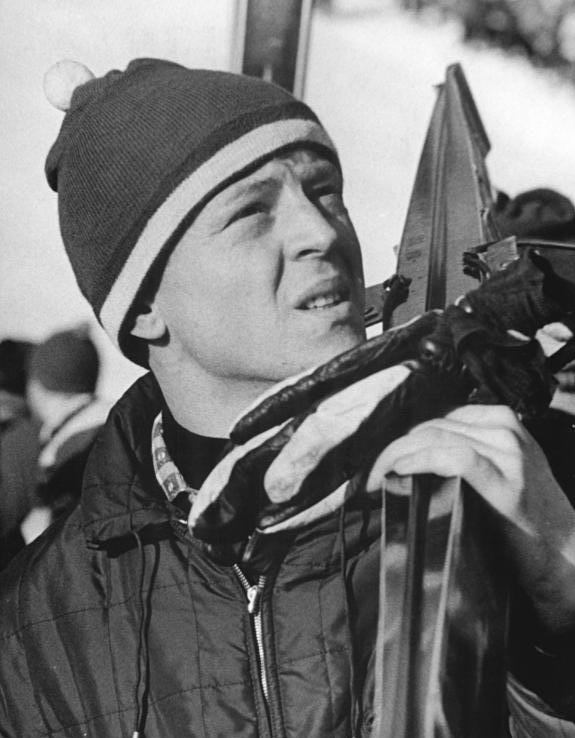
- Karl-Heinz Munk in 1964

Personal information
- Nationality: German
- Born: 11 December 1939 (age 85); Hallenberg, Germany

Sport
- Sport: Ski jumping

Karl-Heinz Munk (born 11 December 1939) is a German ski jumper. He competed in the normal hill and large hill events at the 1964 Winter Olympics.
