= Mogens Christensen =

Norwegian luger (1929–2020)

Personal information
- Born: 9 December 1929; Oslo, Norway
- Died: 25 July 2020 (aged 90)

Sport
- Sport: Luge

Mogens Christensen (9 December 1929 – 25 July 2020) was a Norwegian luger. He was born in Oslo. He participated at the 1964 Winter Olympics in Innsbruck, where he placed 14th in singles. He was Norwegian champion in single in 1963.
