= Antero Immonen =

Finnish ski jumper

Personal information
- Nationality: Finnish
- Born: 15 December 1935 (age 90) Kotka, Finland

Sport
- Sport: Ski jumping

Antero Immonen (born 15 December 1935) is a Finnish ski jumper. He competed in the normal hill and large hill events at the 1964 Winter Olympics.
