= Heribert Schmid =

Swiss ski jumper

Personal information
- Nationality: Swiss
- Born: 8 September 1941 (age 85)

Sport
- Sport: Ski jumping

Heribert Schmid (born 8 September 1941) is a Swiss ski jumper. He competed in the normal hill and large hill events at the 1964 Winter Olympics.
