= Rolf Strandberg =

Swedish ski jumper

Personal information
- Nationality: Swedish
- Born: 4 August 1937; Örnsköldsvik, Sweden
- Died: 15 July 2011 (aged 73); Örnsköldsvik, Sweden

Sport
- Sport: Ski jumping

Rolf Strandberg (4 August 1937 – 15 July 2011) was a Swedish ski jumper. He competed in the individual event at the 1960 Winter Olympics.
