= Tamás Sudár =

Hungarian ski jumper (1941–2021)

Personal information
- Nationality: Hungarian
- Born: 13 July 1941; Budapest, Hungary
- Died: 24 March 2021 (aged 79); Hungary

Sport
- Sport: Ski jumping

Tamás Sudár (13 July 1941 – 24 March 2021) was a Hungarian ski jumper. He competed in the individual event at the 1960 Winter Olympics.
