= Ulf Norberg =

Swedish ski jumper

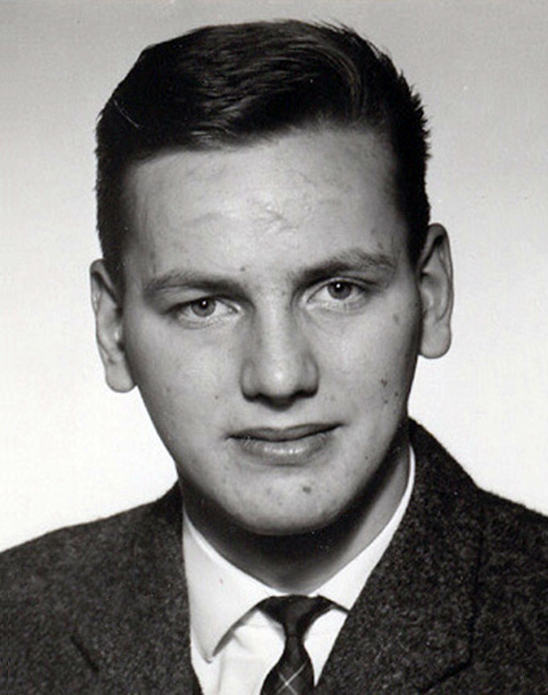

Personal information
- Born: 28 July 1941 Själevad, Sweden
- Died: 18 January 2024 (aged 82)
- Height: 183 cm (6 ft 0 in)
- Weight: 82 kg (181 lb)

Sport
- Sport: Ski jumping
- Club: IF Friska Viljor, Örnsköldsvik

Ulf Nils Johan Norberg (28 July 1941 – 18 January 2024) was a Swedish ski jumper. He competed in the normal hill at the 1968 Winter Olympics and finished in 48th place.
