= Dieter Bokeloh =

German former ski jumper (1942–2022)

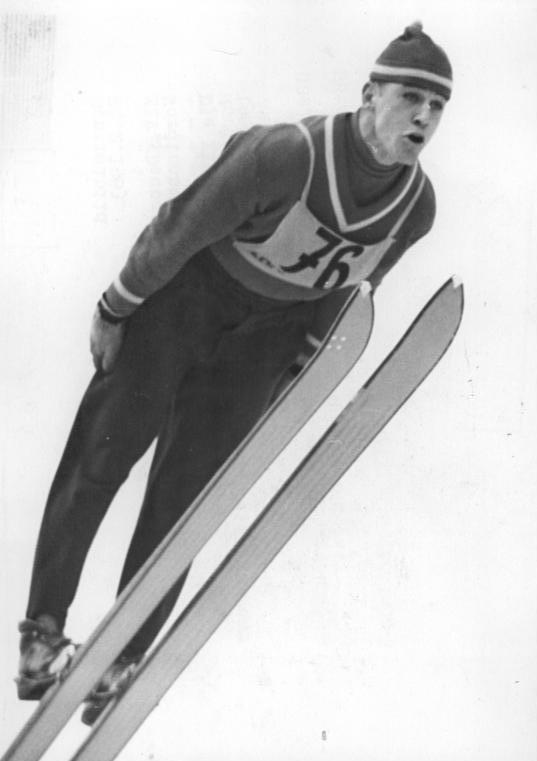
Bokeloh in 1963

Dieter Bokeloh (28 January 1942 – 24 March 2022) was a German ski jumper. He competed in the early 1960s. At the 1964 Winter Olympics in Innsbruck, he finished fourth in the individual large hill event. Bokeloh was born in Benneckenstein and died on 24 March 2022 at the age of 80.
