= Dieter Neuendorf =

German ski jumper (1940–2021)

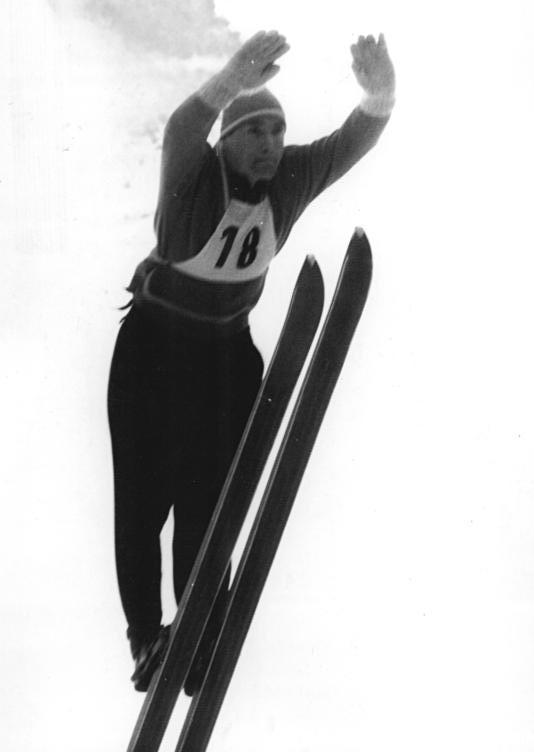
- Neuendorf in 1959

Medal record

Men's ski jumping

Representing East Germany

World Championships
Silver medal – second place	1966 Oslo	Individual normal hill

Dieter Neuendorf (7 July 1940 – 21 May 2021) was an East German ski jumper who competed in the mid-1960s. He won a silver medal in the individual normal hill at the 1966 FIS Nordic World Ski Championships in Oslo.

Neuendorf was born in Ruhla in July 1940. His best finish at the Winter Olympics was 5th in the individual normal hill at Innsbruck in 1964. He also won the ski jump event at the Holmenkollen ski festival in 1965.

He died on 21 May 2021, at the age of 80.
