= Ueli Scheidegger =

Swiss ski jumper

Personal information
- Nationality: Swiss
- Born: 23 July 1938 (age 86)

Sport
- Sport: Ski jumping

Ueli Scheidegger (born 23 July 1938) is a Swiss ski jumper. He competed in the normal hill and large hill events at the 1964 Winter Olympics.
