= Kaare Lien =

Canadian ski jumper (born 1935)

Kaare Lien (born 9 November 1935 in Skoger, Norway) is a Canadian former ski jumper who competed in the 1964 Winter Olympics.
