= Aleksandr Ivannikov =

Soviet ski jumper (born 1945)

Aleksandr Ivannikov (born 23 January 1945 in Moscow) is a Soviet ski jumper who competed from 1963 to 1972. He finished sixth in the individual large hill event at the 1964 Winter Olympics in Innsbruck.

Ivannikov's best career finish was second in an individual normal hill event in Austria in 1964.
