= David Hicks (ski jumper) =

American ski jumper

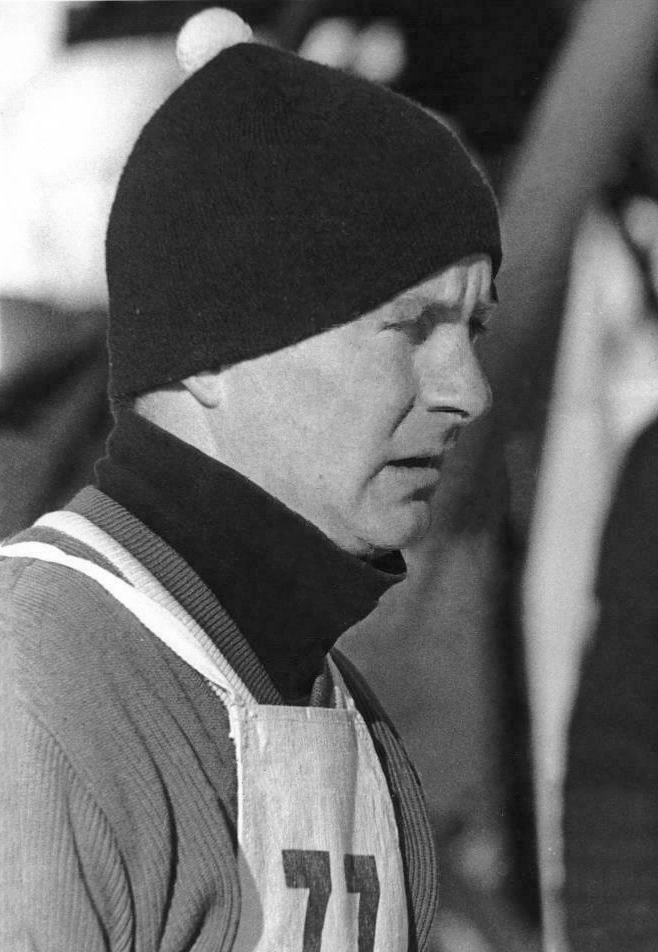
- Hicks in 1970

Personal information
- Born: December 15, 1945 (age 80) Duluth, Minnesota, U.S.
- Height: 168 cm (5 ft 6 in)
- Weight: 68 kg (150 lb)

Sport
- Sport: Ski jumping
- Club: Duluth XC Ski Club

David Anthony Hicks (born December 15, 1945) is an American former ski jumper. He placed 19th in the large hill and 41st in the normal hill at the 1964 Winter Olympics. Next year he won the national title and finished 11th at the Holmenkollen Ski Festival. He graduated from the University of Minnesota Duluth, and in 2017 was inducted into its Athletic Hall of Fame.

Hicks started ski jumping aged 4, on the hill behind his home, together with his elder brother Bruce. He later became an accomplished golfer, and moved to Florida after college aiming to become a professional. From 2001 until his retirement in 2013 he worked as director of the Willowbrook Golf Course near Auburndale, Florida.

In 1973 Hicks married Mary Sue; they live in Auburndale.
