= Yosuke Eto =

Japanese ski jumper

Personal information
- Nationality: Japanese
- Born: 10 May 1934 (age 90); Iiyama, Japan

Sport
- Sport: Ski jumping

Yosuke Eto (born 10 May 1934) is a Japanese ski jumper. He competed at the 1960 Winter Olympics and the 1964 Winter Olympics.
