= Dalibor Motejlek =

Czech ski jumper

Personal information
- Nationality: Czechoslovakia
- Born: 17 April 1942 (age 84) Vysoké nad Jizerou, Protectorate of Bohemia and Moravia
- Height: 168 cm (5 ft 6 in)

Sport
- Sport: Skiing

Achievements and titles
- Personal bests: 142 m (466 ft); Oberstdorf, West Germany (15 February 1964)

Dalibor Motejlek (born 17 April 1942) is a Czech former ski jumper. Motejlek competed for Czechoslovakia in the normal hill and large hill events at the 1964 Winter Olympics.

On 15 February 1964, he set the ski jumping world record distance at 142 metres (466 ft) on Heini-Klopfer-Skiflugschanze in Oberstdorf, West Germany.
