= Ski jumping at the 1964 Winter Olympics =

Ski jumping at the IX Olympic Winter Games
- Pictogram for ski jumping
- Venue: Bergiselschanze (large hill) & Seefeld (normal hill)
- Dates: 31 January – 9 February 1964
- Competitors: 66 from 17 nations

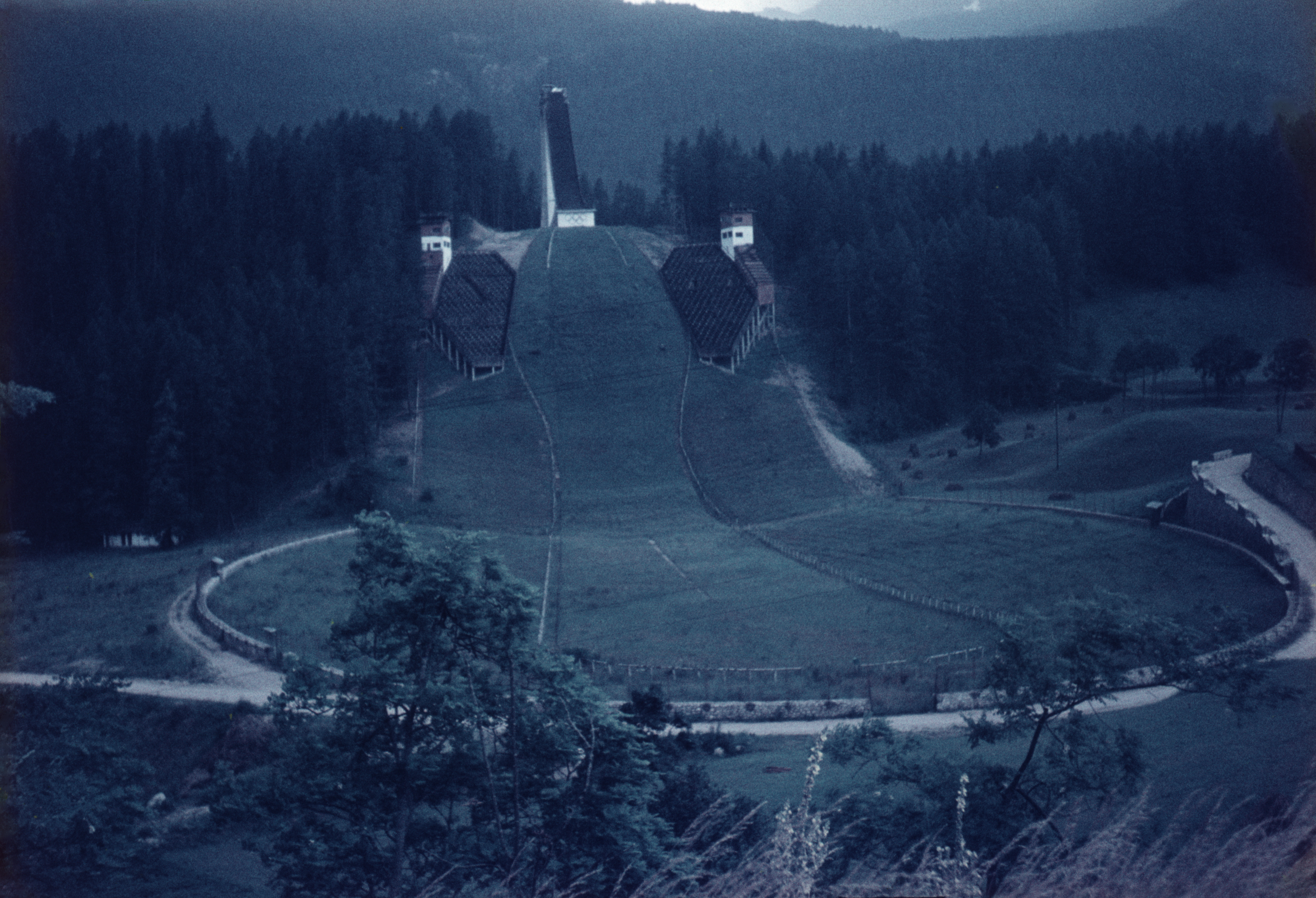
Bergisel ski jump from the 1964 Winter Olympics, Innsbruck, Austria. Image taken in 1966

Ski jumping at the 1964 Winter Olympics consisted of two events held from 31 January to 9 February, with the large hill event taking place at Bergiselschanze, and the normal hill event at Seefeld. For the first time at the olympics, more than one ski jumping event was contested, with the addition of a normal hill competition.

== Medal summary ==
=== Medal table ===
Rank	Nation	Gold	Silver	Bronze	Total
1	Norway	1	1	2	4
2	Finland	1	1	0	2
Totals (2 entries)		2	2	2	6

Norway led the medal table with four, one gold. Since this was the first Olympics with more than one ski jumping event, the four ski jumping medals were the highest for any nation in Olympic history to that point.

=== Events ===
Event	Gold		Silver		Bronze	
Normal hill	Veikko Kankkonen; Finland	229.9	Toralf Engan; Norway	226.3	Torgeir Brandtzæg; Norway	222.9
Large hill	Toralf Engan; Norway	230.7	Veikko Kankkonen; Finland	228.9	Torgeir Brandtzæg; Norway	227.2

== Participating NOCs ==
Fifteen nations participated in ski jumping at the Innsbruck Games.

- Austria (4)
- Canada (2)
- Finland (4)
- United Team of Germany (5)
- Hungary (2)
- Italy (3)
- Japan (4)
- Norway (5)
- Poland (5)
- Switzerland (3)
- Sweden (4)
- Czechoslovakia (3)
- Soviet Union (5)
- United States (4)
- Yugoslavia (4)
