= Andrzej Sztolf =

Polish ski jumper

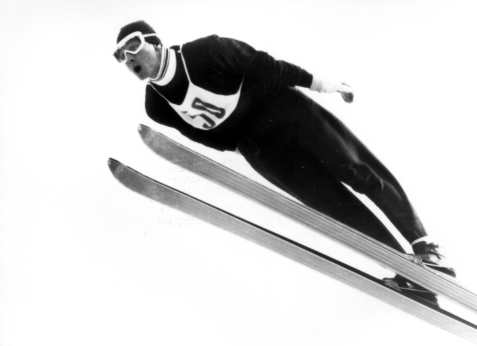

Personal information
- Born: 9 June 1941 Przeworsk, Podkarpackie, Poland
- Died: 1 February 2012 (aged 70) Kraków, Poland

Sport
- Sport: Skiing

Andrzej Sztolf (9 June 1941 – 1 February 2012) was a Polish ski jumper. He competed in the large hill event at the 1964 Winter Olympics.
