= Antoni Łaciak =

Polish ski jumper

Medal record

Men's ski jumping

Representing Poland

World Championships
Silver medal – second place	1962 Zakopane	Individual normal hill

Antoni Jan Łaciak (23 June 1939 in Szczyrk – 6 February 1989 in Katowice) is a Polish former ski jumper who competed in the 1960s. He won a silver medal in the individual normal hill at the 1962 FIS Nordic World Ski Championships in Zakopane.

Łaciak's best non-world championships finish was 8th in the normal hill event at Garmisch-Partenkirchen in 1963. He also competed in the normal hill event at the 1964 Winter Olympics.
