= Waldemar Heigenhauser =

Austrian Nordic combined skier

Personal information
- Nationality: Austrian
- Born: 24 May 1939 (age 86) Saalfelden, Nazi Germany

Sport
- Sport: Nordic combined

Waldemar Heigenhauser (born 24 May 1939) is an Austrian skier. He competed in the Nordic combined events at the 1964 Winter Olympics and the 1968 Winter Olympics.
