= Veit Kührt =

German ski jumper

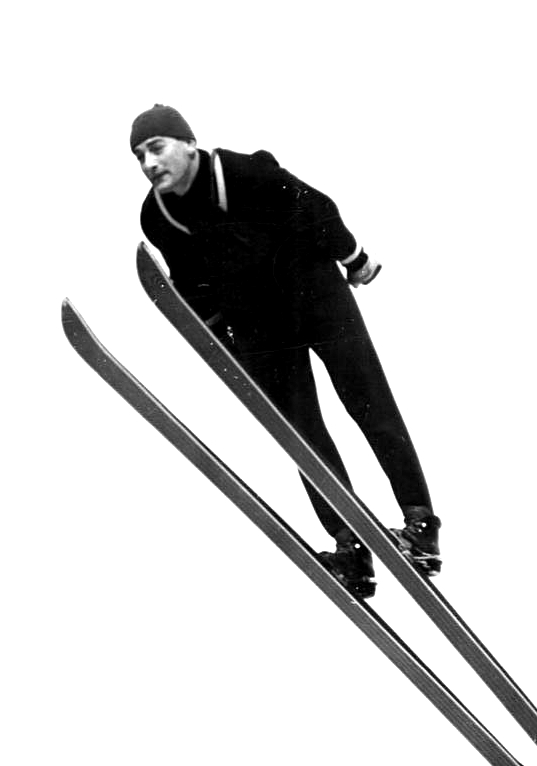
- Veit Kührt in 1962

Personal information
- Nationality: German
- Born: 3 December 1940 (age 85) Zella-Mehlis, Germany

Sport
- Sport: Ski jumping

Veit Kührt (born 3 December 1940) is a German former ski jumper. He competed in the individual event at the 1960 Winter Olympics.

== Career ==
After winning gold in the individual event at the 1960 East German Championships ahead of Harald Pfeffer and Günter Oettel, Kührt made his international debut at the 1960 Winter Olympics in Squaw Valley at just 19 years of age. In the normal hill event, he achieved a surprising 12th place.

In the winter of 1960/61, Kührt competed for the first time in the Four Hills Tournament 1960/61. At the opening event in Oberstdorf, he finished seventh, his best individual result at a Four Hills Tournament. A few days later he took part in the Neujahrsspringen on the Große Olympiaschanze in Garmisch-Partenkirchen. After finishing 16th there, he placed 42nd on the Bergiselschanze in Innsbruck. He completed the tournament with an 18th place in Bischofshofen and finished 49th overall.

After not taking part in the next tournament season, Kührt competed at the 1962 Nordic World Ski Championships in Zakopane. In the normal hill event, he placed sixth. On the large hill, he finished 12th.

In the Four Hills Tournament 1962/63, Kührt competed only in Innsbruck, finishing 37th and placing 72nd in the overall standings. For more than three years afterward, he did not compete internationally. In 1964, he again won gold at the East German Championships. At the 1966 Nordic World Ski Championships in Oslo, he returned to international competition. He placed fifth on the normal hill and ninth on the large hill.

After the world championships, he competed in his final Four Hills Tournament 1966/67 in December. For the second time after 1960/61, he started in all four events and achieved his best individual result at the tournament with a 13th place. He finished 33rd overall. At the 1967 East German Championships, Kührt competed in the team event and won silver with his team. One year later, together with Horst Queck, Peter Lesser and Heinz Schmidt, he won the gold medal.
