= Torbjørn Yggeseth =

Norwegian ski jumper (1934–2010)

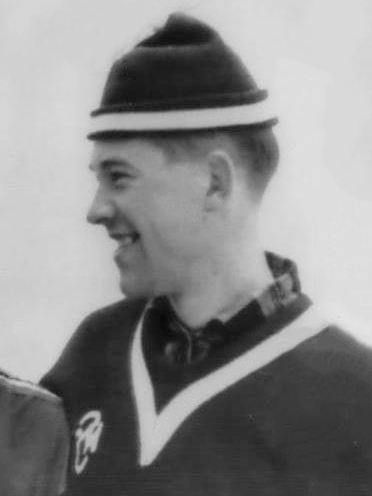
- Yggeseth in 1960

Personal information
- Born: 18 June 1934 Asker, Norway
- Died: 10 January 2010 (aged 75) Asker, Norway

Sport
- Sport: Ski jumping
- Club: Heggedal IL

Torbjørn Yggeseth (18 June 1934 – 10 January 2010) was a Norwegian ski jumper who was active in the 1960s. He competed for Heggedal Idretsslag.

Yggeseth won the ski jumping competition at the Holmenkollen ski festival in 1963, the same year he earned the Holmenkollen medal (shared with Alevtina Kolchina, Pavel Kolchin, and Astrid Sandvik). He also had two career victories. Competing in two Winter Olympics, he earned his best finish of fifth in the individual large hill event at Squaw Valley in 1960. After retiring from competitions, Yggeseth had been involved in administrative roles inside the FIS, including serving on its technical committee for ski jumping as chair from 1982 to 2004.

Yggeseth trained in the United States Air Force as a pilot. He also created the Ski Jumping World Cup which first began in the 1979–80 season. He died of prostate cancer, aged 75.
