= Baldur Preiml =

Austrian ski jumper (1939–2025)

Personal information
- Born: 8 July 1939; Greifenburg, Reichsgau Kärnten, Germany
- Died: 27 January 2025 (aged 85); Spittal an der Drau, Carinthia, Austria

Baldur Preiml
Medal record

Men's ski jumping

Representing Austria

Olympic Games
Bronze medal – third place	1968 Grenoble	Individual Normal Hill

World Championships
Bronze medal – third place	1968 Grenoble	Individual Normal Hill

Baldur Preiml (8 July 1939 – 27 January 2025) was an Austrian ski jumper who competed from 1960 to 1968. His best-known finish was a Bronze medal in the Individual Normal Hill at the 1968 Winter Olympics in Grenoble.

Preiml died in Spittal an der Drau, Carinthia on 27 January 2025, at the age of 85.
