= Holger Karlsson =

Swedish ski jumper (1935–2015)

Personal information
- Nationality: Swedish
- Born: 3 February 1935 Gällivare, Sweden
- Died: 18 September 2015 (aged 80) Norrbotten, Sweden

Sport
- Sport: Ski jumping

Holger Karlsson (3 February 1935 – 18 September 2015) was a Swedish ski jumper. He competed at the 1956 Winter Olympics and the 1964 Winter Olympics.
