= Peter Eržen =

Slovenian ski jumper

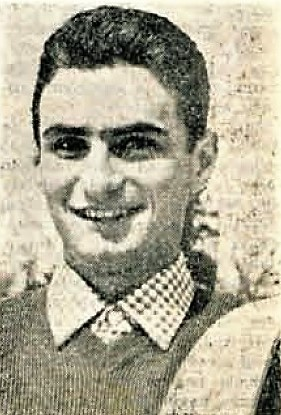
- Peter Eržen in 1960

Personal information
- Nationality: Slovenian
- Born: 13 December 1941 (age 84) Kranj, Yugoslavia

Sport
- Sport: Ski jumping

Peter Eržen (born 13 December 1941) is a Slovenian ski jumper. He competed at the 1964 Winter Olympics and the 1968 Winter Olympics.
