= Józef Przybyła =

Polish ski jumper

Józef Przybyła (29 January 1945 – 21 March 2009) was a Polish ski-jumper active from 1963 to 1971. He had some success in 1964 and competed in two Winter Olympic Games.
