= Ensio Hyytiä =

Finnish ski jumper (1938–2019)

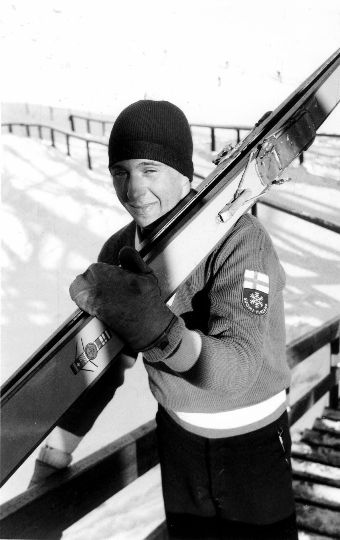

Medal record

Men's ski jumping

Representing Finland

World Championships
Silver medal – second place	1958 Lahti	Individual large hill

Ensio Hyytiä (24 March 1938 – 24 March 2019) was a Finnish ski jumper who competed in the late 1950s and early 1960s. He won the ski jumping silver medal at the 1958 FIS Nordic World Ski Championships in Lahti. He was born in Rovaniemi. He also competed at the 1960 Winter Olympics and the 1964 Winter Olympics.
