= László Csávás =

Hungarian ski jumper

Personal information
- Nationality: Hungarian
- Born: 19 September 1934 (age 92) Budapest, Hungary

Sport
- Sport: Ski jumping

László Csávás (born 19 September 1934) is a Hungarian ski jumper. He competed in the normal hill and large hill events at the 1964 Winter Olympics.
