= Toralf Engan =

Norwegian ski jumper

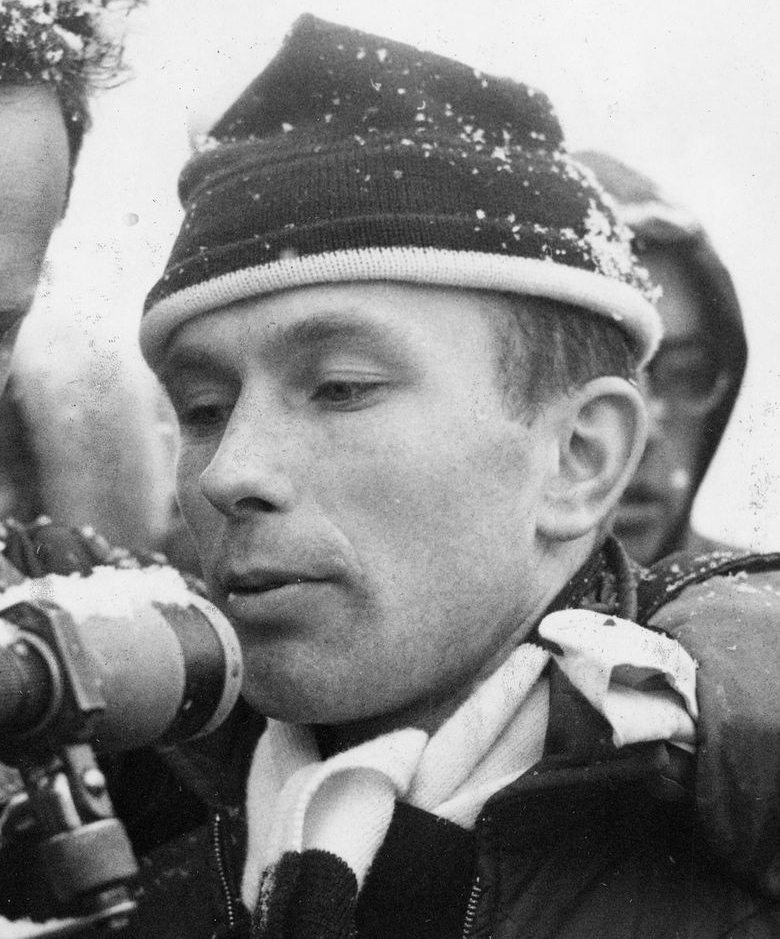
- Engan in 1962

Personal information
- Born: 1 October 1936 (age 89) Meldal Municipality, Norway

Sport
- Sport: Ski jumping
- Club: IL Leik, Hølonda
Medal record
Representing Norway
Olympic Games
Gold medal – first place	1964 Innsbruck	Individual large hill
Silver medal – second place	1964 Innsbruck	Individual normal hill
World Championships
Gold medal – first place	1962 Zakopane	Individual normal hill
Gold medal – first place	1964 Innsbruck	Individual large hill
Silver medal – second place	1964 Innsbruck	Individual normal hill

Toralf Engan (born 1 October 1936) is a retired Norwegian ski jumper. At the 1964 Winter Olympics he won the large hill and placed second in the new normal hill event. His other victories include the Four Hills Tournament, which he had won the preceding season, as well as the 1962 FIS Nordic World Ski Championships in the individual normal hill (the first ever in that event). Engan won the ski jumping normal hill event at the 1962 Holmenkollen ski festival, the same year he won the Holmenkollen medal. Engan retired after the 1966 season. Later he worked as a national ski jumping coach in 1967–69, and settled in Trondheim with his family.
