= John Balfanz =

American ski jumper

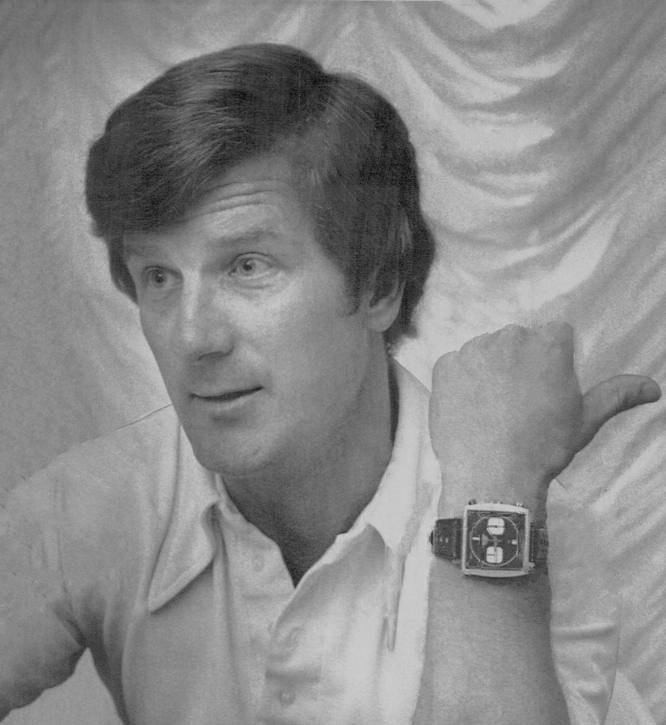
- Balfanz in 1975

Personal information
- Born: June 23, 1940 Minneapolis, U.S.
- Died: November 11, 1991 (aged 51) Denver, U.S.
- Height: 178 cm (5 ft 10 in)
- Weight: 73 kg (161 lb)

Sport
- Sport: Ski Jumping
- Club: Minneapolis Ski Club

John Carlyle Balfanz (June 23, 1940 – November 11, 1991) was an American ski jumper. He competed in the 1964 and 1968 Winter Olympics with the best result of 10th place in the normal hill in 1964.

Balfanz took up ski jumping aged six, and by age 15 won the Central US Junior Championships. In 1957–1959 he served in the U.S. Army, first at Fort Carson in the U.S. and then in Karlsruhe, Germany. He took part in the 1962 World Championships in Poland, and in 17 international meets in Europe in 1963, winning two, and placing second at the Holmenkollen Ski Festival. In 1965 he set a U.S. national record at 325 feet (99 m) at Iron Mountain, Michigan. Balfanz retired from competitions after the 1968 Olympics, and later worked a national jumping coach. In 1980 he was inducted into the American Ski Jumping Hall of Fame.
