= Sepp Lichtenegger =

Austrian ski jumper

Personal information
- Nationality: Austrian
- Born: 13 November 1937 (age 88) Bad Goisern am Hallstättersee, Austria

Sport
- Sport: Ski jumping

Sepp Lichtenegger (born 13 November 1937) is an Austrian ski jumper. He competed at the 1964 Winter Olympics and the 1968 Winter Olympics.
