= Josef Matouš =

Czech former ski jumper (born 1942)

Josef Matouš (born 6 January 1942) is a Czech former ski jumper who competed for Czechoslovakia from 1963 to 1974. He finished fourth in the individual normal hill event at the 1964 Winter Olympics in Innsbruck. Matouš's best career finish was third twice, both earned in the individual normal hill event in Oberstdorf, West Germany in 1968 and 1969. He was born in Poděbrady.
