= Niilo Halonen =

Finnish ski jumper (1940–2025)

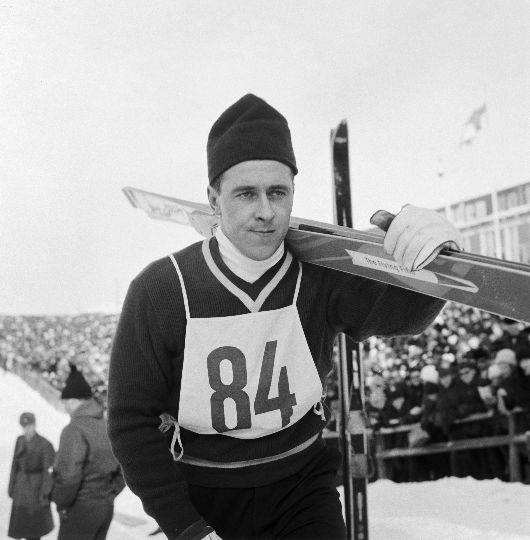
- 1965

Medal record

Men's ski jumping

Representing Finland

Olympic Games
Silver medal – second place	1960 Squaw Valley	Individual Large Hill

World Championships
Silver medal – second place	1960 Squaw Valley	Individual Large Hill
Bronze medal – third place	1962 Zakopane	Individual large hill

Kalle Niilo Ponteva Halonen (25 December 1940 – 17 August 2025) was a Finnish ski jumper who competed between 1960 and 1967. His biggest success was the silver medal in the individual large hill at the 1960 Winter Olympics in Squaw Valley.

== Biography ==
Halonen was born in Kouvola on 25 December 1940. He also won the bronze medal in the individual large hill at the 1962 FIS Nordic World Ski Championships in Zakopane. He finished second in a normal hill competition in Germany in 1964.

Halonen died on 17 August 2025, at the age of 84.
