= Torgeir Brandtzæg =

Norwegian ski jumper

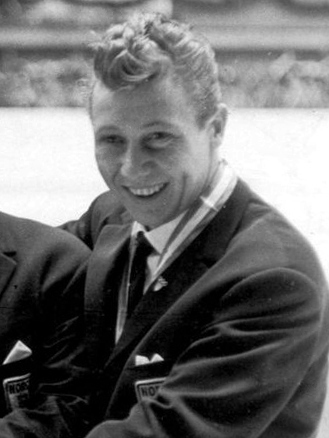
- Brandtzæg at the 1964 Olympics

Personal information
- Born: 6 October 1941 (age 84) Ogndal Municipality, Reichskommissariat Norwegen (today Norway)

Sport
- Sport: Ski jumping
- Club: Ogndal Idrettslag
Medal record
Representing Norway
Olympic Games
Bronze medal – third place	1964 Innsbruck	Individual normal hill
Bronze medal – third place	1964 Innsbruck	Individual large hill
World Championships
Bronze medal – third place	1964 Innsbruck	Individual normal hill
Bronze medal – third place	1964 Innsbruck	Individual large hill

Torgeir Torbjørn Brandtzæg (born 6 October 1941) is a retired Norwegian ski jumper who won bronze medals both in the large hill and normal hill at the 1964 Winter Olympics.

Brandtzæg placed fifth in the Four Hills Tournament in 1963; he won it in 1965, placing first in three out of four events. He also held the national jumping titles in 1963–1965. In 1965, while competing in Finland, he broke his leg in three places and was forced to retire. After that he married and became a farmer in Sparbu. One of his sons, Roy Brandtzæg, became a European powerlifting champion.
