= Ludvik Zajc =

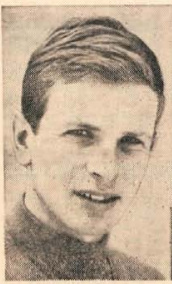

Personal information
- Born: 21 January 1943 Jesenice
- Died: 18 July 2011 (aged 68) Oslo, Norway

Ludvik Zajc (21 January 1943 – 18 July 2011) was a ski jumper who competed for Yugoslavia. He was born in Jesenice (current Slovenia), and later settled in Norway.

He competed at the 1964 Winter Olympics in Innsbruck, and at the 1968 Winter Olympics in Grenoble.

He served as head coach for the Norwegian national ski jumping team from 1998 to 2002.
