= Giacomo Aimoni =

Italian ski jumper (1939–2026)

Personal information
- Nationality: Italy
- Born: 23 December 1939 Ponte di Legno, Italy
- Died: 29 August 2026 (aged 86) Ponte di Legno, Italy
- Height: 1.70 m (5 ft 7 in)
- Weight: 72 kg (159 lb)

Sport
- Sport: Ski jumping

Giacomo Aimoni (23 December 1939 – 29 August 2026) was an Italian ski jumper. He competed in the 1964 and 1968 Winter Olympics.

Aimoni died on 29 August 2026, at the age of 86.
