= Miro Oman =

Yugoslavian ski jumper (1936–2012)

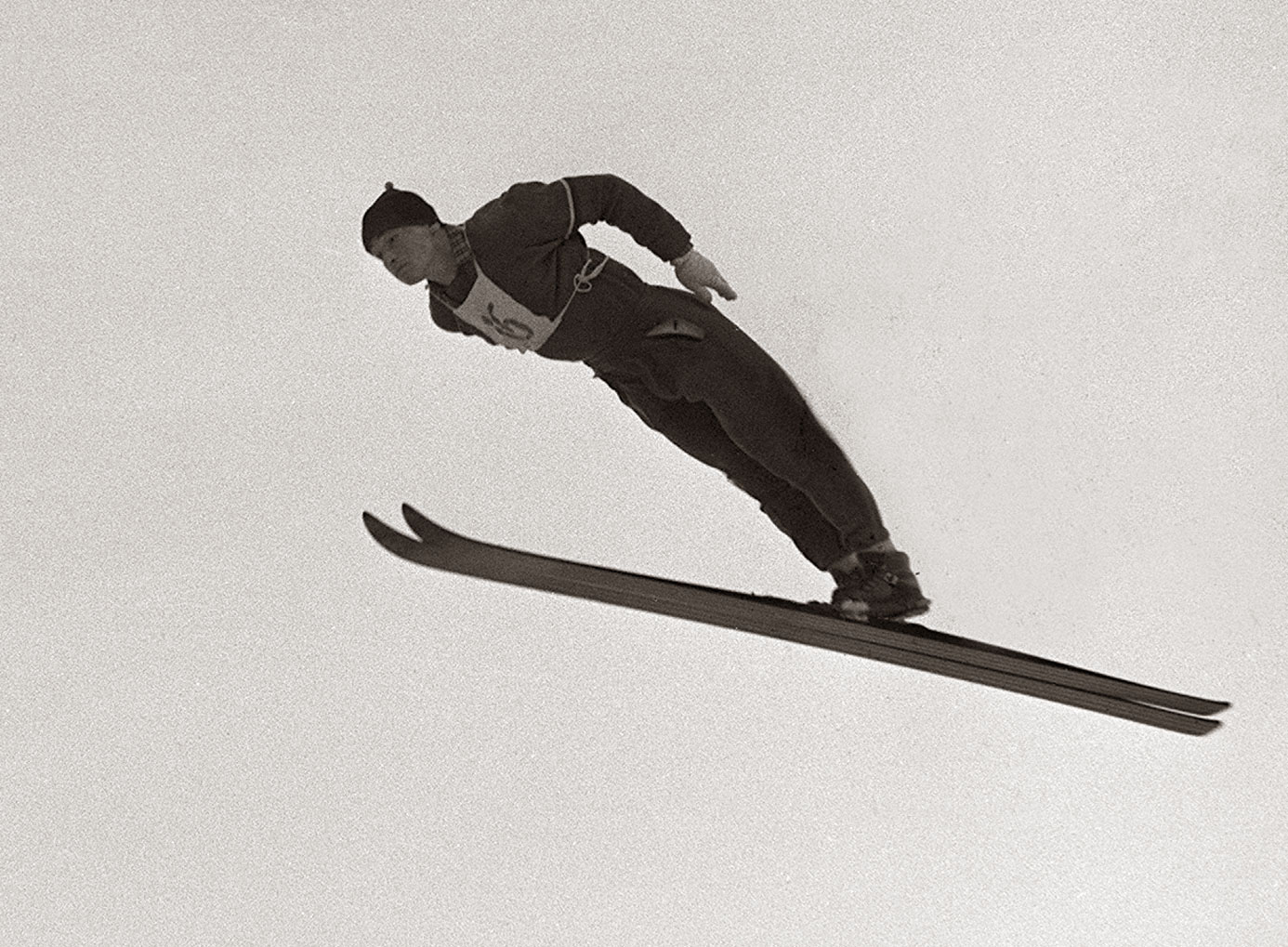

Personal information
- Full name: Miro Oman
- Born: 11 January 1936 Tržič, Kingdom of Yugoslavia
- Died: 15 July 2012 (aged 76)

Sport
- Sport: Skiing

Achievements and titles
- Personal bests: 135 m (443 ft); Planica, 6 Mar 1969
- Updated on 30 March 2015

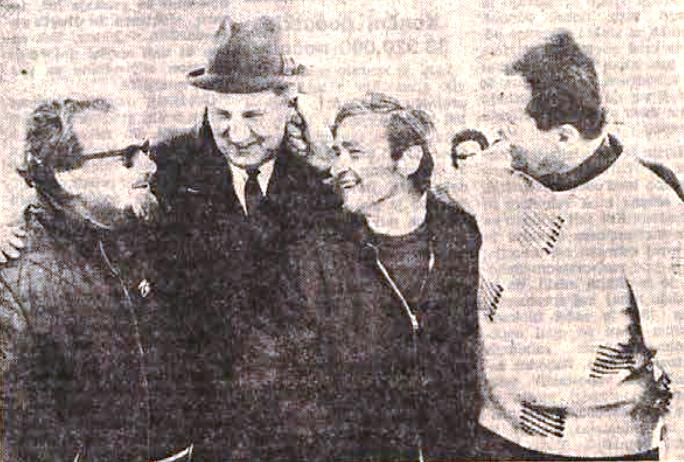
Third from the left

Miro Oman (11 January 1936 – 15 July 2012) was a Yugoslavian ski jumper.

== Career ==
Oman competed in the late 1950s and throughout the 1960s. He participated at the 1962 Ski Jumping World Championships and 1964 Winter Olympics in Innsbruck, albeit without notable results at either event. Between 1959 and 1966 he also competed at the Four Hills Tournament, where his best result was fifteenth place in Garmisch-Partenkirchen in 1963.

=== 1969: Premiere jump in Planica ===
On 6 March 1969, he was given the honour of being the very first to jump from the new ski flying hill in Planica, Velikanka bratov Gorišek, setting a distance of 135 metres (443 ft).
