= 1971–72 Four Hills Tournament =

Ski jumping competition

Four Hills Tournament
- Venues: Schattenbergschanze, Bergiselschanze, Große Olympiaschanze, Paul-Ausserleitner-Schanze
- Location: Germany, Austria
- Dates: 29 December 1971 – 6 January 1972
- Competitors: 100 from 17 nations

Medalists
gold medal	(Norway) Ingolf Mork
silver medal	(East Germany) Henry Glaß
bronze medal	(Finland) Tauno Käyhkö

For the 20th edition of the Four Hills Tournament, the FIS deviated from the traditional order of events and started the tour in Innsbruck. The overall winner was Norwegian Ingolf Mork. In the previous year, Mork won three out of four events while only placing second overall.

Before the tournament started, the Japanese team already announced that they would only participate in the first three events before returning to Japan in order to prepare for the 1972 Winter Olympics in Sapporo five weeks later. This decision ended up taking the tournee victory from Yukio Kasaya, who won all three events he participated in, and had a lead of 50.4 points to Mork. He would have been the first non-European tour winner. The preparation paid off: The Japanese took all three medals at the Olympic Normal hill event, Kasaya winning Gold.

== Participating nations and athletes ==
A Bulgarian jumper competed for the first time. The Japanese team did not sign up for the final event in Bischofshofen.

Nation	Number of Athletes	Athletes
Germany	11	Klaus Boll, Peter Dubb, Günther Göllner, Alfred Grosche, Franz Keller, Walter Lampe, Ralph Pöhland, Sepp Schwinghammer, Alfred Winkler, Ernst Wursthorn, Bernd Zapf
Austria	8	Reinhold Bachler, Max Golser, Ernst Kröll, Hans Millonig, Franz Salhofer, Karl Schnabl, Walter Schwabl, Rudolf Wanner
Bulgaria	1	Ivan Sandov
Canada	4	Rick Gulyas, Ulf Kvendbo, Zdenek Mezl, Peter Wilson
Czechoslovakia	9	Bohumil Doležal, Rudolf Höhnl, Zbynek Hubac, Karel Kodejška, Jaromír Liďák, Josef Matouš, Jiří Raška, František Rydval, Leoš Škoda
East Germany	8	Dietmar Aschenbach, Hans-Georg Aschenbach, Henry Glaß, Christian Kiehl, Heinz Schmidt, Rainer Schmidt, Manfred Wolf, Heinz Wosipiwo
Finland	4	Tauno Käyhkö, Esko Rautionaho, Jouko Törmänen, Kari Ylianttila
France	4	Jacques Gaillard, Alain Macle, Gilbert Poirot, Yvan Richard
Hungary	3	László Gellér, Mihály Gellér, Antal Zámbó
Italy	4	Albino Bazana, Mario Ceccon, Gelindo Fogliaresi, Bruno Patti
Japan	7	Seiji Aochi, Takashi Fujisawa, Hiroshi Itagaki, Yukio Kasaya, Akitsugu Konno, Mineyuki Mashiko, Hisayoshi Sawada
Norway	8	Jo Inge Bjørnebye, Lars Grini, Ingolf Mork, Odd Hammernes, Frithjof Prydz, Petter Skarseth, Bent Tomtum, Bjørn Wirkola
Poland	6	Wojciech Fortuna, Stanisław Gąsienica Daniel, Slawomir Kardas, Adam Krzysztofiak, Tadeusz Pawlusiak, Ryszard Witke
Soviet Union	7	Aleksandr Ivannikov, Yury Kalinin, Gariy Napalkov, Vladimir Terichev, Sergey Yanin, Koba Zakadze, Anatoliy Zheglanov
Sweden	4	Tommy Eriksson, Eilerth Mähler, Andreas Lundquist, Rolf Nordgren
Switzerland	5	Eric Aubert, Hans Schmid, Walter Steiner, Ernst von Grünigen, Josef Zehnder
Yugoslavia	7	Marjan Mesec, Bogdan Norčič, Marian Prelovšek, Danilo Pudgar, Drago Pudgar, Peter Štefančič, Ludvik Zajc

== Results ==
=== Innsbruck ===
(Austria) Bergiselschanze, Innsbruck
29 December 1971

Yukio Kasaya, who was in dominating form in the winter of 1971/72, became the first Non-European to win an event at the Four Hills Tournament. The Czechoslovak and Norwegian teams disappointed with modest results for several tournament favourites, among them title holder Jiří Raška (12th), Ingolf Mork (22nd) and three-time competition winner Bjørn Wirkola (44th).

Rank	Name	Points
1	(Japan) Yukio Kasaya	245.2
2	(East Germany) Rainer Schmidt	235.5
3	(Finland) Tauno Käyhkö	229.9
4	(East Germany) Henry Glaß	225.4
5	(Soviet Union) Yury Kalinin	224.6
6	(East Germany) Heinz Wosipiwo	223.7
7	(Japan) Takashi Fujisawa	222.7
8	(Soviet Union) Gariy Napalkov	222.4
9	(East Germany) Heinz Schmidt	220.0
9	(Soviet Union) Anatoliy Zheglanov	220.0

=== Garmisch-Partenkirchen ===
(Germany) Große Olympiaschanze, Garmisch-Partenkirchen
1 January 1972

Rank	Name	Points
1	(Japan) Yukio Kasaya	242.9
2	(Finland) Tauno Käyhkö	229.2
3	(Norway) Ingolf Mork	227.5
4	(Japan) Takashi Fujisawa	222.5
4	(East Germany) Heinz Wosipiwo	222.5
6	(Japan) Seiji Aochi	222.2
7	(Japan) Hiroshi Itagaki	221.4
8	(Norway) Bjørn Wirkola	218.6
8	(East Germany) Henry Glaß	218.6
10	(Soviet Union) Anatoliy Zheglanov	218.3

=== Oberstdorf ===
(Germany) Schattenbergschanze, Oberstdorf
2 January 1972

Rank	Name	Points
1	(Japan) Yukio Kasaya	247.9
2	(Norway) Ingolf Mork	246.5
3	(Switzerland) Hans Schmid	235.4
4	(Soviet Union) Yury Kalinin	233.6
5	(Finland) Esko Rautionaho	232.0
6	(Japan) Hiroshi Itagaki	231.3
7	(East Germany) Rainer Schmidt	229.7
8	(Soviet Union) Gariy Napalkov	228.3
9	(West Germany) Günther Göllner	226.8
10	(East Germany) Hans-Georg Aschenbach	226.5

=== Bischofshofen ===
(Austria) Paul-Ausserleitner-Schanze, Bischofshofen
6 January 1972

Not taking Kasaya into account, who would not compete at Bischofshofen, the leading field was close together. Mork, who was leading Käyhkö with a margin of 1.2 points, saw his closest competitors struggle: Käyhkö (31st), R. Schmidt (56th), Kalinin (21st).

Veteran Zakadze finished in the Top Ten, precisely sixteen years after his first victory at a Four Hills event.

Rank	Name	Points
1	(Norway) Bjørn Wirkola	233.6
2	(Czechoslovakia) Jiří Raška	233.0
3	(Czechoslovakia) Zbynek Hubac	229.5
4	(Norway) Ingolf Mork	229.0
5	(Austria) Reinhold Bachler	228.8
6	(East Germany) Hans-Georg Aschenbach	226.1
7	(Soviet Union) Koba Zakadze	225.7
7	(Switzerland) Walter Steiner	225.7
9	(East Germany) Henry Glaß	225.0
10	(Czechoslovakia) Rudolf Höhnl	224.9

== Final ranking ==
Rank	Name	Innsbruck	Garmisch-Partenkirchen	Oberstdorf	Bischofshofen	Points
1	(Norway) Ingolf Mork	22nd	3rd	2nd	4th	914.6
2	(East Germany) Henry Glaß	4th	9th	13th	9th	893.6
3	(Finland) Tauno Käyhkö	3rd	2nd	12th	31st	892.3
4	(East Germany) Heinz Wosipiwo	6th	4th	22nd	11th	888.8
5	(Soviet Union) Yury Kalinin	5th	16th	4th	21st	886.4
6	(Czechoslovakia) Jiří Raška	12th	32nd	25th	2nd	877.0
7	(East Germany) Hans-Georg Aschenbach	35th	18th	10th	6th	872.0
7	(Soviet Union) Koba Zakadze	19th	13th	20th	7th	872.0
9	(Soviet Union) Gariy Napalkov	8th	26th	8th	32nd	869.8
10	(Norway) Bjørn Wirkola	44th	8th	27th	1st	869.3
