= 1972–73 Four Hills Tournament =

Ski jumping competition

Four Hills Tournament
- Venues: Schattenbergschanze, Bergiselschanze, Große Olympiaschanze, Paul-Ausserleitner-Schanze
- Location: West Germany, Austria
- Dates: 30 December 1972 – 6 January 1973
- Competitors: 97 from 17 nations

Medalists
gold medal	(East Germany) Rainer Schmidt
silver medal	(East Germany) Hans-Georg Aschenbach
bronze medal	(Soviet Union) Sergei Botschkov

== Participating nations and athletes ==
Nation	Number of Athletes	Athletes
West Germany	7	Alfred Grosche, Heini Ihle, Sepp Schwinghammer, Rudi Tusch, Albert Wursthorn, Ernst Wursthorn, Bernd Zapf
Austria	7	Reinhold Bachler, Willi Pürstl, Franz Salhofer, Karl Schnabl, Walter Schwabl, Hans Wallner, Rudolf Wanner
Bulgaria	4	Georgi Guedurov, Georgi Lasev, Ivan Sandov, Ivan Scharkov
Canada	7	Kim Fripp, Richard Grady, Richard Graves, Paul Martin, Tom Reaper, Lyle Speers, Peter Wilson
Czechoslovakia	8	Ladislav Divila, Bohumil Doležal, Rudolf Höhnl, Zbynek Hubac, Karel Kodejška, Jaromír Liďák, Leoš Škoda, Jaroslav Slama
East Germany	8	Hans-Georg Aschenbach, Jochen Danneberg, Bernd Eckstein, Henry Glaß, Dietrich Kampf, Rainer Schmidt, Manfred Wolf, Heinz Wosipiwo
Finland	4	Tauno Käyhkö, Esko Rautionaho, Juhani Ruotsalainen, Kari Ylianttila
France	3	Jacques Gaillard, Philippe Jacoberger, Gilbert Poirot
Italy	3	Ermes Bontempelli, Mario Ceccon, Leo De Crignis
Japan	6	Masakatsu Asari, Hiroshi Itagaki, Koji Kakuta, Yukio Kasaya, Takafumi Kawabata, Hisayoshi Sawada
Norway	6	Odd Grette, Knut Kongsgård, Frithjof Prydz, Nils-Per Skarseth, Kai Solbustad, Bent Tomtum
Poland	7	Stanisław Bobak, Wojciech Fortuna, Stanisław Gąsienica Daniel, Czesław Janik, Slawomir Kardas, Tadeusz Pawlusiak, Józef Tajner
Soviet Union	6	Sergei Botschkov, Wladimir Galuschin, Yury Kalinin, Menschikow, Vladimir Smirnov, Vladimir Terichev
Sweden	4	Christer Karlsson, Eilerth Mähler, Andreas Lundquist, Rolf Nordgren
Switzerland	6	Eric Aubert, Fredy Guinard, Hans Schmid, Walter Steiner, Ernst von Grünigen, Josef Zehnder
United States	6	Mike Devecka, Chris McNeill, Ron Neal, Ron Steele, Dave Tomten, Jeff Wright
Yugoslavia	6	Janez Loštrek, Marjan Mesec, Bogdan Norčič, Marian Prelovšek, Danilo Pudgar, Peter Štefančič

== Results ==
=== Oberstdorf ===
(West Germany) Schattenbergschanze, Oberstdorf
30 December 1972

Rank	Name	Points
1	(East Germany) Rainer Schmidt	237.0
2	(East Germany) Hans-Georg Aschenbach	233.5
3	(East Germany) Henry Glaß	226.2
4	(Switzerland) Hans Schmid	220.3
5	(East Germany) Manfred Wolf	215.5
6	(Czechoslovakia) Rudolf Höhnl	215.0
7	(East Germany) Dietrich Kampf	210.7
8	(Austria) Reinhold Bachler	208.7
9	(Finland) Esko Rautionaho	208.4
10	(West Germany) Alfred Grosche	205.4

=== Garmisch-Partenkirchen ===
(West Germany) Große Olympiaschanze, Garmisch-Partenkirchen
1 January 1973

Rank	Name	Points
1	(East Germany) Rainer Schmidt	229.1
2	(East Germany) Dietrich Kampf	222.4
3	(Czechoslovakia) Jaromír Liďák	217.3
4	(East Germany) Manfred Wolf	216.8
5	(East Germany) Jochen Danneberg	215.0
6	(East Germany) Henry Glaß	214.6
7	(Switzerland) Walter Steiner	214.5
8	(Soviet Union) Sergei Botschkov	212.7
9	(Japan) Hiroshi Itagaki	209.5
10	(Poland) Wojciech Fortuna	208.4

=== Innsbruck ===
(Austria) Bergiselschanze, Innsbruck
3 January 1973

Rank	Name	Points
1	(Soviet Union) Sergei Botschkov	231.9
2	(East Germany) Rainer Schmidt	228.9
3	(East Germany) Hans-Georg Aschenbach	224.4
4	(Switzerland) Walter Steiner	221.5
5	(Switzerland) Hans Schmid	216.7
6	(Japan) Yukio Kasaya	214.8
7	(Finland) Tauno Käyhkö	212.1
8	(East Germany) Manfred Wolf	210.6
8	(Poland) Tadeusz Pawlusiak	210.6
10	(Japan) Hiroshi Itagaki	209.6

=== Bischofshofen ===
(Austria) Paul-Ausserleitner-Schanze, Bischofshofen
6 January 1973

Rank	Name	Points
1	(Czechoslovakia) Rudolf Höhnl	234.6
2	(Soviet Union) Sergei Botschkov	233.4
3	(East Germany) Hans-Georg Aschenbach	231.8
4	(Czechoslovakia) Jaromír Liďák	231.2
5	(Japan) Hiroshi Itagaki	230.7
6	(East Germany) Jochen Danneberg	229.8
7	(Czechoslovakia) Karel Kodejška	225.1
8	(Switzerland) Walter Steiner	224.3
9	(East Germany) Manfred Wolf	223.2
10	(Austria) Reinhold Bachler	222.7

== Final ranking ==
Rank	Name	Innsbruck	Garmisch-Partenkirchen	Oberstdorf	Bischofshofen	Points
1	(East Germany) Rainer Schmidt	1st	1st	2nd	12th	913.9
2	(East Germany) Hans-Georg Aschenbach	2nd	11th	3rd	3rd	897.5
3	(Soviet Union) Sergei Botschkov	17th	8th	1st	2nd	874.2
4	(Switzerland) Hans Schmid	4th	12th	5th	11th	867.2
5	(East Germany) Manfred Wolf	5th	4th	8th	9th	866.1
6	(Czechoslovakia) Rudolf Höhnl	6th	16th	12th	1st	858.9
7	(Switzerland) Walter Steiner	19th	7th	4th	8th	855.8
8	(East Germany) Henry Glaß	3rd	6th	22nd	21st	846.1
9	(Japan) Hiroshi Itagaki	20th	9th	10th	5th	844.8
10	(East Germany) Jochen Danneberg	21st	5th	13th	6th	841.4
