= 1968–69 Four Hills Tournament =

Ski jumping competition

Four Hills Tournament
- Venues: Schattenbergschanze, Bergiselschanze, Große Olympiaschanze, Paul-Ausserleitner-Schanze
- Location: Germany, Austria
- Dates: 29 December 1968 – 5 January 1969
- Competitors: 76 from 14 nations

Medalists
gold medal	(Norway) Bjørn Wirkola
silver medal	(Czechoslovakia) Jiří Raška
bronze medal	(Czechoslovakia) Zbyněk Hubač

In 1969, Norwegian Bjørn Wirkola became the first person to win the Four Hills Tournament three times in a row. He was the fifth athlete to win the first three events, but yet again the 'Grand Slam' was denied, this time by Wirkola's closest rival Jiří Raška. It was a disappointing tournament for the two host nations with the best athlete from either being Reinhold Bachler, finishing 11th overall.

== Participating nations and athletes ==
For the first time in seven years, no non-European nations participated. The national groups of Germany and Austria only competed at the two events in their respective countries.

Nation	Number of Athletes	Athletes
Germany	5 (+5)	Franz Bisle, Günther Göllner, Walter Lampe, Henrik Ohlmayr, Oswald Schinze; National Group: Alfred Grosche, Friedhelm Klapproth, Ralph Pöhland, Sepp Schwinghammer, Alfred Winkler
Austria	11 (+3)	Reinhold Bachler, Helmut Diess, Max Golser, Albert Haim, Ernst Kröll, Sepp Lichtenegger, Franz Salhofer, Willi Schuster, Erich Schwabl, Walter Schwabl, Janko Zwitter; National Group: Heinz Jölly, Franz Kuchlbacher, Ernst Wimmer
Czechoslovakia	7	Ladislav Divila, Rudolf Höhnl, Zbyněk Hubač, Karel Kodejška, Jan Matouš, Jiří Raška, František Rydval
East Germany	7	Bernd Karwofski, Horst Queck, Manfred Queck, Heinz Schmidt, Rainer Schmidt, Wilfried Schüller, Clemens Walter
Finland	3	Keijo Leiho, Topi Mattila, Juhani Ruotsalainen
France	4	Jannie Arnould, Nicolas Gaide, Alain Macle, Gilbert Poirot
Hungary	3	László Gellér, Mihály Gellér, János Taffener
Italy	3	Giacomo Aimoni, Albino Bazana, Mario Ceccon
Norway	3	Lars Grini, Knut Kongsgård, Jan Olaf Roaldset, Bent Tomtum, Bjørn Wirkola
Poland	2	Andrej Sztolf, Ryszard Witke
Soviet Union	5	Vladimir Belousov, Aleksandr Ivannikov, Gariy Napalkov, Wiezeslav Zerbakov, Anatoliy Zheglanov
Sweden	3	Torbjörn Hedberg, Thord Karlsson, Olle Martinsson
Switzerland	4	Richard Pfiffner, Hans Schmid, Heribert Schmid, Urs Schönl, Sepp Zehnder
Yugoslavia	6	Vinko Bogataj, Branko Dolhar, Janez Jurman, Marjan Mesec, Peter Štefančič, Ludvik Zajc

== Results ==
=== Oberstdorf ===
(Germany) Schattenbergschanze, Oberstdorf
29 December 1968

Rank	Name	Points
1	(Norway) Bjørn Wirkola	218.7
2	(Czechoslovakia) Jiří Raška	215.7
3	(Czechoslovakia) Josef Matouš	210.5
4	(East Germany) Heinz Schmidt	210.1
5	(East Germany) Manfred Queck	209.9
6	(Czechoslovakia) Rudolf Höhnl	205.4
7	(Czechoslovakia) Ladislav Divila	199.9
8	(Soviet Union) Vladimir Belousov	199.7
9	(Austria) Reinhold Bachler	199.3
9	(Socialist Federal Republic of Yugoslavia) Ludvik Zajc	199.3

=== Garmisch-Partenkirchen ===
(Germany) Große Olympiaschanze, Garmisch-Partenkirchen
1 January 1969

Rank	Name	Points
1	(Norway) Bjørn Wirkola	241.2
2	(Soviet Union) Anatoliy Zheglanov	235.4
3	(Czechoslovakia) František Rydval	233.8
4	(Soviet Union) Vladimir Belousov	233.6
5	(East Germany) Heinz Schmidt	232.3
6	(Czechoslovakia) Zbyněk Hubač	228.4
7	(Czechoslovakia) Ladislav Divila	226.5
8	(Soviet Union) Gariy Napalkov	222.1
9	(East Germany) Horst Queck	221.8
10	(Norway) Lars Grini	221.2

=== Innsbruck ===
(Austria) Bergiselschanze, Innsbruck
4 December 1969

Rank	Name	Points
1	(Norway) Bjørn Wirkola	236.3
2	(Czechoslovakia) Jiří Raška	235.5
3	(Soviet Union) Anatoliy Zheglanov	225.9
4	(Norway) Lars Grini	222.6
5	(Czechoslovakia) Zbyněk Hubač	219.9
6	(Czechoslovakia) Rudolf Höhnl	214.1
7	(Czechoslovakia) František Rydval	212.4
8	(East Germany) Horst Queck	212.2
9	(Soviet Union) Gariy Napalkov	210.8
10	(East Germany) Heinz Schmidt	209.7

=== Bischofshofen ===
(Austria) Paul-Ausserleitner-Schanze, Bischofshofen
5 January 1969

Rank	Name	Points
1	(Czechoslovakia) Jiří Raška	234.7
2	(Norway) Bjørn Wirkola	228.3
3	(Norway) Lars Grini	222.6
4	(Soviet Union) Anatoliy Zheglanov	219.2
5	(Czechoslovakia) Zbyněk Hubač	218.8
6	(Soviet Union) Wiezeslav Zerbakov	211.4
7	(Czechoslovakia) Ladislav Divila	211.0
8	(Czechoslovakia) František Rydval	209.9
9	(Soviet Union) Vladimir Belousov	208.1
10	(Norway) Bent Tomtum	207.0

== Final ranking ==
Rank	Name	Oberstdorf	Garmisch-Partenkirchen	Innsbruck	Bischofshofen	Points
1	(Norway) Bjørn Wirkola	1st	1st	1st	2nd	924.5
2	(Czechoslovakia) Jiří Raška	2nd	21st	2nd	1st	900.5
3	(Czechoslovakia) Zbyněk Hubač	11th	6th	5th	5th	866.0
4	(Soviet Union) Anatoliy Zheglanov	23rd	2nd	3rd	4th	862.0
5	(Czechoslovakia) František Rydval	14th	3rd	7th	8th	848.2
6	(Soviet Union) Vladimir Belousov	8th	4th	19th	9th	839.3
7	(Czechoslovakia) Rudolf Höhnl	6th	15th	6th	14th	838.3
8	(East Germany) Heinz Schmidt	4th	5th	10th	30th	830.8
9	(Norway) Lars Grini	59th	10th	4th	3rd	812.5
10	(Czechoslovakia) Ladislav Divila	7th	7th	41st	7th	810.8
