= 1966–67 Four Hills Tournament =

Ski jumping competition

Four Hills Tournament
- Venues: Schattenbergschanze, Bergiselschanze, Große Olympiaschanze, Paul-Ausserleitner-Schanze
- Location: Germany, Austria
- Dates: 30 December 1966 – 8 January 1967
- Competitors: 81 from 16 nations

Medalists
gold medal	(Norway) Bjørn Wirkola
silver medal	(Austria) Sepp Lichtenegger
bronze medal	(East Germany) Dieter Neuendorf

The 15th annual Four Hills Tournament was won by Norwegian athlete Bjørn Wirkola who secured three dominating victories after a surprising double victory for the East German team in Oberstdorf.

== Participating nations and athletes ==
The national groups of Germany and Austria only competed at the two events in their respective countries.

Nation	Number of Athletes	Athletes
Germany	5 (+2)	Günther Göllner, Wolfgang Happle, Heini Ihle, Franz Keller, Henrik Ohlmayr; National Group: Oswald Schinze, Alfred Winkler
Austria	7 (+7)	Reinhold Bachler, Max Golser, Albert Haim, Sepp Lichtenegger, Baldur Preiml, Willi Schuster, Walter Schwabl; National Group: Willi Egger, Fritz Gamweger, Heinz Jölly, Franz Kuchlbacher, Erich Schwabl, Heinz Themesl, Janko Zwitter
Canada	2	Ulf Kvendbo, Patrick Morris
Czechoslovakia	7	Ladislav Divila, Rudolf Höhnl, Zbyněk Hubač, Jozef Metelka, Dalibor Motejlek, Jiří Raška, František Rydval
East Germany	7	Veit Kührt, Peter Lesser, Karl-Heinz Munk, Dietmar Neuendorf, Manfred Queck, Heinz Schmidt, Wolfgang Stöhr
Finland	6	Niilo Halonen, Veikko Kankkonen, Olli Korhonen, Paavo Maunu, Erkki Pukka, Heikki Väisänen
France	5	Maurice Arbez, Alain Macle, Jean-Marie Poirot, Gilbert Poirot, James Yerrly
Italy	3	Giacomo Aimoni, Mario Ceccon, Ezio Damolin
Japan	3	Takashi Fujisawa, Yoshihiko Itō, Kimio Saitō
Norway	3	Ronald Jensen, Christoffer Selbekk, Bjørn Wirkola
Poland	5	Sławomir Kardas, Józef Kocyan, Józef Przybyla, Piotr Wala, Ryszard Witke
Soviet Union	4	Waleri Jemeljanow, Pyotr Kovalenko, Mikhail Veretennikov, Koba Zakadze
Sweden	3	Thord Karlsson, Tommy Karlsson, Mats Östman
Switzerland	5	Richard Pfiffner, Hans Schmid, Heribert Schmid, Max Walter, Sepp Zehnder
United States	3	Dave Lundmark, Jay Martin, Adrian Watt
Yugoslavia	4	Peter Eržen, Marjan Pecar, Stanko Smolej, Ludvik Zajc

== Results ==
=== Oberstdorf ===
(Germany) Schattenbergschanze, Oberstdorf
30 December 1966

Rank	Name	Points
1	(East Germany) Dieter Neuendorf	202.2
2	(East Germany) Peter Lesser	201.5
3	(Finland) Veikko Kankkonen	200.6
3	(Norway) Bjørn Wirkola	200.6
5	(Austria) Sepp Lichtenegger	198.9
6	(Poland) Józef Przybyla	198.3
7	(Soviet Union) Waleri Jemeljanow	194.5
7	(Soviet Union) Mikhail Veretennikov	194.5
9	(East Germany) Wolfgang Stöhr	192.6
10	(Czechoslovakia) Zbyněk Hubač	190.3

=== Garmisch-Partenkirchen ===
(Germany) Große Olympiaschanze, Garmisch-Partenkirchen
1 January 1967

Rank	Name	Points
1	(Norway) Bjørn Wirkola	229.0
2	(Austria) Reinhold Bachler	222.8
3	(Finland) Veikko Kankkonen	222.4
4	(East Germany) Dieter Neuendorf	220.5
5	(East Germany) Manfred Queck	215.8
6	(Soviet Union) Waleri Jemeljanow	214.1
7	(East Germany) Peter Lesser	213.0
8	(Norway) Ronald Jensen	209.4
9	(Czechoslovakia) Jiří Raška	208.8
10	(Austria) Max Golser	208.4

=== Innsbruck ===
(Austria) Bergiselschanze, Innsbruck
6 December 1967

Rank	Name	Points
1	(Norway) Bjørn Wirkola	237.7
2	(Germany) Franz Keller	228.3
3	(Austria) Sepp Lichtenegger	223.2
4	(Norway) Christoffer Selbekk	222.0
5	(Czechoslovakia) Jiří Raška	215.9
6	(East Germany) Peter Lesser	215.2
7	(East Germany) Dieter Neuendorf	214.4
8	(United States) Jay Martin	214.0
9	(Socialist Federal Republic of Yugoslavia) Peter Eržen	213.7
10	(Poland) Józef Kocyan	213.2

=== Bischofshofen ===
(Austria) Paul-Ausserleitner-Schanze, Bischofshofen
8 January 1967

Rank	Name	Points
1	(Norway) Bjørn Wirkola	242.7
2	(Czechoslovakia) Jiří Raška	233.4
3	(Austria) Sepp Lichtenegger	219.4
4	(Norway) Ronald Jensen	219.1
5	(Finland) Veikko Kankkonen	214.8
6	(East Germany) Dieter Neuendorf	209.4
6	(Czechoslovakia) Zbyněk Hubač	209.4
8	(Germany) Franz Keller	208.9
9	(United States) Adrian Watt	206.8
10	(East Germany) Manfred Queck	205.3

== Final ranking ==
Rank	Name	Oberstdorf	Garmisch-Partenkirchen	Innsbruck	Bischofshofen	Points
1	(Norway) Bjørn Wirkola	3rd	1st	1st	1st	910.0
2	(Austria) Sepp Lichtenegger	2nd	6th	1st	3rd	847.6
3	(East Germany) Dieter Neuendorf	1st	4th	7th	6th	846.5
4	(Finland) Veikko Kankkonen	3rd	3rd	27th	5th	834.8
5	(East Germany) Peter Lesser	2nd	7th	6th	14th	833.0
6	(Germany) Franz Keller	23rd	21st	2nd	8th	820.8
7	(Czechoslovakia) Jiří Raška	42nd	9th	5th	2nd	820.1
8	(Czechoslovakia) Zbyněk Hubač	10th	15th	16th	7th	812.6
9	(Poland) Józef Przybyla	6th	22nd	15th	12th	811.9
10	(Soviet Union) Mikhail Veretennikov	7th	12th	18th	15th	810.2
