= Planica 1969 =

Ski jump competition

Coordinates: 46°28′35″N 13°43′16″E

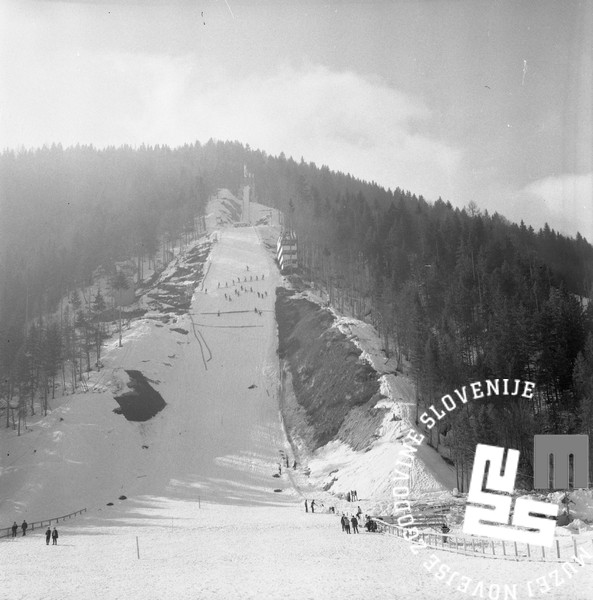
- Host city: Planica, SR Slovenia, Yugoslavia
- Sport: Ski flying
- Events: Smuški poleti Ski Flying Week
- Main venue: Velikanka bratov Gorišek K153

Planica 1969 was a first competition on a new ski flying hill at Smuški poleti Ski Flying Week competition, held from 21 to 23 March 1969 in Planica, Yugoslavia. With 95,000 people in three days.

== Schedule ==
Date	Event	Rounds	Longest jump of the day	Visitors
6 March 1969	Hill test, premiere	1	135 metres (443 ft) by Miro Oman	N/A
21 March 1969	Competition, Day 1	3	156 metres (512 ft) by Bjørn Wirkola	15,000
22 March 1969	Competition, Day 2	3	164 metres (538 ft) by Jiří Raška	35,000
23 March 1969	Competition, Day 3	3	165 metres (541 ft) by Manfred Wolf	45,000

== Competition ==
On 6 March 1969, two weeks before competition a hill test with trial jumper was made. Yugoslavian Miro Oman baptized Velikanka bratov Gorišek K153 hill around 14:00 PM local time with 135 metres (443 ft).

On 21 March 1969 hill was officially opened with first day of competition called Smuški poleti Ski Flying Week with three rounds, but only the best one counted into official result. The first day brought world record distance at 156 metres by Bjørn Wirkola.

On 22 March 1969 second day of competition was on schedule with three rounds and two best rounds counted into official result. World record was tied and improved three times: Jiří Raška (156 m, 164 m) and Bjørn Wirkola (160 m).

On 23 March 1969 third and final day of competition was on schedule with three rounds and two best rounds counted into official result in front of 45,000 people. Manfred Wolf set already the fifth and the last world record this weekend at 165 metres in the last round. Jiří Raška won the three day competition with total five valid rounds: one best from the first day, two best rounds from the second day and two best rounds from the third day.

=== Hill test ===
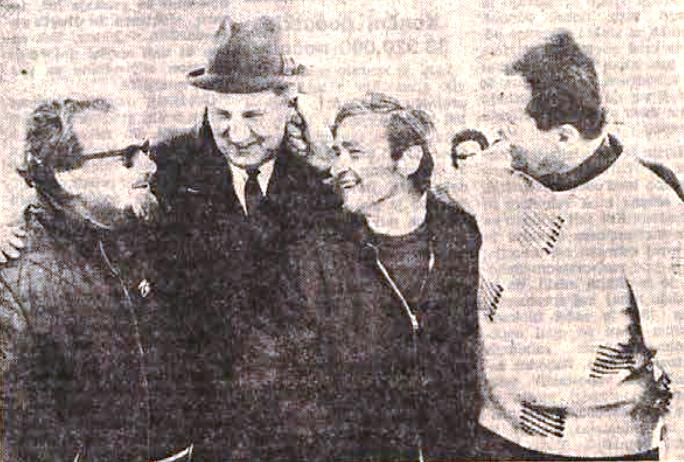
Miro Oman, 3rd from left, right after premiere test jump at 135 metres (6 March 1969)

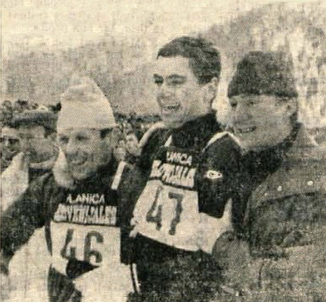
Manfred Wolf in the middle right after WR.

14:00 PM — 6 March 1969 — premiere

Bib	Name	Test
1	(Socialist Federal Republic of Yugoslavia) Miro Oman	135.0 m

=== Ski Flying Week: Day 1 ===
10:30 AM — 21 March 1969 — Three rounds: one best round into official results

Rank	Bib	Name	1RD	2RD	3RD	Points
1	56	(Norway) Bjørn Wirkola	135.0 m	156.0 m	134.0 m	181.0
2	51	(Czechoslovakia) Jiří Raška	148.0 m	120.0 m	146.0 m	180.5
3	30	(Norway) Lars Grini	146.0 m	114.0 m	117.0 m	174.0
4	33	(East Germany) Horst Queck	137.0 m	149.0 m	144.0 m	171.0
5	49	(Czechoslovakia) Zbyněk Hubač	136.0 m	132.0 m	118.0 m	165.9
6	17	(East Germany) Jürgen Dommerich	137.0 m	134.0 m	133.0 m	162.5
7	26	(Poland) Ryszard Witke	133.0 m	130.0 m	121.0 m	157.0
8	42	(Soviet Union) Gariy Napalkov	123.0 m	122.0 m	154.0 m	155.0
9	37	(Czechoslovakia) Ladislav Divila	130.0 m	127.0 m	—	152.5
10	41	(East Germany) Christian Kiehl	123.0 m	128.0 m	130.0 m	152.0
11	43	(Socialist Federal Republic of Yugoslavia) Peter Štefančič	126.0 m	114.0 m	118.0 m	151.5
12	7	(East Germany) Rainer Schmidt	118.0 m	114.0 m	132.0 m	151.0
13	45	(East Germany) Manfred Wolf	123.0 m	132.0 m	127.0 m	150.0
14	57	(Austria) Reinhold Bachler	123.0 m	132.0 m	121.0 m	148.5
15	38	(Czechoslovakia) František Rydval	124.0 m	111.0 m	122.0 m	147.0
16	27	(Austria) Ernst Kröll	116.0 m	125.0 m	126.0 m	146.0
17	24	(Soviet Union) Koba Zakadze	115.0 m	121.0 m	124.0 m	144.5
18	47	(Czechoslovakia) Rudolf Hohnl	119.0 m	115.0 m	123.0 m	143.0
	54	(United States) Adrian Watt	124.0 m	128.0 m	111.0 m	143.0
20	14	(Czechoslovakia) Rudolf Doubek	121.0 m	119.0 m	118.0 m	142.5
21	36	(Austria) Walter Schwabl	111.0 m	128.0 m	117.0 m	141.5
22	50	(Switzerland) Josef Zehnder	117.0 m	120.0 m	113.0 m	141.5
23	39	(Czechoslovakia) Josef Matouš	92.0 m	151.0 m	130.0 m	140.5
	3	(Czechoslovakia) Josef Kraus	111.0 m	113.0 m	125.0 m	140.5
25	15	(Poland) Stanislaw Kubica	121.0 m	126.0 m	114.0 m	139.5
26	31	(West Germany) Heini Ihle	96.0 m	112.0 m	122.0 m	139.0
27	13	(Socialist Federal Republic of Yugoslavia) Branko Dolhar	112.0 m	121.0 m	121.0 m	138.0
	40	(Poland) Józef Przybyła	106.0 m	107.0 m	121.0 m	138.0
29	10	(Socialist Federal Republic of Yugoslavia) Marjan Pečar	115.0 m	115.0 m	117.0 m	137.5
30	25	(Socialist Federal Republic of Yugoslavia) Janez Jurman	111.0 m	106.0 m	118.0 m	134.5
36	29	(Socialist Federal Republic of Yugoslavia) Marjan Mesec	103.0 m	118.0 m	102.0 m	128.0
39	18	(Socialist Federal Republic of Yugoslavia) Danilo Pudgar	111.0 m	110.0 m	111.0 m	124.0
43	1	(Socialist Federal Republic of Yugoslavia) Stanko Smolej	107.0 m	106.0 m	96.0 m	120.0
46	52	(Socialist Federal Republic of Yugoslavia) Peter Eržen	110.0 m	106.0 m	102.0 m	116.5
51	6	(Socialist Federal Republic of Yugoslavia) Andrej Nahtigal	97.0 m	93.0 m	98.0 m	106.5
53	55	(Socialist Federal Republic of Yugoslavia) Ludvik Zajc	96.0 m	100.0 m	103.0 m	104.0
54	5	(Socialist Federal Republic of Yugoslavia) Oto Giacomelli	86.0 m	96.0 m	96.0 m	100.5
56	23	(Socialist Federal Republic of Yugoslavia) Marjan Prelovšek	111.0 m	N/A	N/A	90.5
N/A	22	(Hungary) Mihály Gellér	120.0 m	N/A	N/A	N/A
N/A	2	(Czechoslovakia) Jozef Metelka	101.0 m	N/A	N/A	N/A
N/A	4	(Czechoslovakia) Dalibor Motejlek	N/A	N/A	N/A	N/A
N/A	8	(Austria) Erich Schwabl	N/A	N/A	N/A	N/A
N/A	9	(Norway) Bent Tomtum	N/A	N/A	N/A	N/A
N/A	11	(Switzerland) Richard Pfiffner	N/A	N/A	N/A	N/A
N/A	12	(Czechoslovakia) Bohumil Doležal	N/A	N/A	N/A	N/A
N/A	19	(Czechoslovakia) František Novák	N/A	N/A	N/A	N/A
N/A	20	(Austria) Willy Schuster	N/A	N/A	N/A	N/A
N/A	21	(Soviet Union) Konstantin Shcherbakov	N/A	N/A	N/A	N/A
N/A	28	(United States) Greg Swor	N/A	N/A	N/A	N/A
N/A	32	(Czechoslovakia) Karel Kodejška	N/A	N/A	N/A	N/A
N/A	34	(Italy) Giacomo Aimoni	N/A	N/A	N/A	N/A
N/A	35	(Switzerland) Hans Schmid	N/A	N/A	N/A	N/A
N/A	44	(Italy) Albino Bazzana	N/A	N/A	N/A	N/A
N/A	46	(West Germany) Henrik Ohlmeyer	N/A	N/A	N/A	N/A
N/A	48	(Hungary) László Gellér	N/A	N/A	N/A	N/A
N/A	53	(Austria) Max Golser	N/A	N/A	N/A	N/A
—	16	Free number. In honour to late Heini Klopfer.				

=== Ski Flying Week: Day 2 ===
10:30 AM — 22 March 1969 — Three rounds; two best into official results — Day 1 best round also calculated into points.

Rank	Bib	Name	1RD	2RD	3RD	Points
1	46	(Norway) Bjørn Wirkola	160.0 m	162.0 m	145.0 m	541.5
2	37	(Czechoslovakia) Jiří Raška	156.0 m	164.0 m	144.0 m	538.5
3	38	(East Germany) Manfred Wolf	135.0 m	156.0 m	159.0 m	499.5
4	24	(East Germany) Horst Queck	145.0 m	150.0 m	146.0 m	497.0
5	53	(Czechoslovakia) Zbyněk Hubač	133.0 m	147.0 m	150.0 m	494.0
6	21	(Norway) Lars Grini	147.0 m	137.0 m	134.0 m	490.0
7	51	(East Germany) Christian Kiehl	145.0 m	154.0 m	142.0 m	475.0
8	18	(East Germany) Rainer Schmidt	146.0 m	145.0 m	129.0 m	462.0
9	36	(Soviet Union) Gari Napalkov	120.0 m	135.0 m	133.0 m	452.5
10	5	(East Germany) Jürgen Dommerich	128.0 m	143.0 m	132.0 m	449.5
11	19	(Austria) Walter Schwabl	133.0 m	147.0 m	111.0 m	442.5
12	47	(Czechoslovakia) Rudolf Hohnl	124.0 m	135.0 m	134.0 m	437.0
13	34	(Austria) Ernst Kröll	129.0 m	129.0 m	132.0 m	432.0
14	17	(Czechoslovakia) Bohumil Doležal	138.0 m	137.0 m	123.0 m	429.5
15	42	(Socialist Federal Republic of Yugoslavia) Branko Dolhar	132.0 m	136.0 m	135.0 m	428.5
16	50	(Austria) Reinhold Bachler	124.0 m	127.0 m	126.0 m	426.0
17	32	(Poland) Józef Przybyła	132.0 m	121.0 m	127.0 m	424.5
18	44	(Czechoslovakia) Josef Matouš	124.0 m	143.0 m	148.0 m	419.5
19	29	(Soviet Union) Koba Zakadze	119.0 m	118.0 m	133.0 m	415.0
20	52	(Switzerland) Josef Zehnder	116.0 m	132.0 m	112.0 m	411.0
21	49	(Austria) Max Golser	121.0 m	132.0 m	126.0 m	409.5
22	7	(Czechoslovakia) Josef Kraus	124.0 m	120.0 m	123.0 m	409.0
23	39	(Socialist Federal Republic of Yugoslavia) Peter Štefančič	113.0 m	118.0 m	122.0 m	406.0
24	25	(Czechoslovakia) Rudolf Doubek	115.0 m	112.0 m	124.0 m	405.0
25	43	(Poland) Ryszard Witke	112.0 m	125.0 m	104.0 m	403.0
26	40	(West Germany) Heini Ihle	113.0 m	147.0 m	118.0 m	392.5
27	23	(United States) Adrian Watt	106.0 m	117.0 m	119.0 m	387.0
28	26	(West Germany) Henrik Ohlmeyer	109.0 m	124.0 m	119.0 m	386.0
29	14	(Poland) Stanislaw Kubica	113.0 m	124.0 m	133.0 m	385.5
30	45	(Socialist Federal Republic of Yugoslavia) Marjan Mesec	113.0 m	122.0 m	120.0 m	382.5
34	8	(Socialist Federal Republic of Yugoslavia) Peter Eržen	119.0 m	117.0 m	111.0 m	367.5
36	13	(Socialist Federal Republic of Yugoslavia) Danilo Pudgar	124.0 m	92.0 m	101.0 m	364.5
39	15	(Socialist Federal Republic of Yugoslavia) Marjan Pečar	98.0 m	109.0 m	101.0 m	349.5
41	48	(Socialist Federal Republic of Yugoslavia) Ludvik Zajc	102.0 m	118.0 m	110.0 m	345.0
41	28	(Socialist Federal Republic of Yugoslavia) Stanko Smolej	93.0 m	104.0 m	109.0 m	344.5
46	1	(Socialist Federal Republic of Yugoslavia) Oto Giacomelli	103.0 m	104.0 m	105.0 m	320.5
47	3	(Socialist Federal Republic of Yugoslavia) Andrej Nahtigal	102.0 m	93.0 m	94.0 m	313.0
49	33	(Socialist Federal Republic of Yugoslavia) Janez Jurman	106.0 m	106.0 m	110.0 m	306.0
N/A	2	(Czechoslovakia) Jozef Metelka	N/A	N/A	N/A	N/A
N/A	4	(Czechoslovakia) Dalibor Motejlek	N/A	N/A	N/A	N/A
N/A	6	(Austria) Willy Schuster	N/A	N/A	N/A	N/A
N/A	9	(Norway) Bent Tomtum	N/A	N/A	N/A	N/A
N/A	10	(Switzerland) Richard Pfiffner	N/A	N/A	N/A	N/A
N/A	11	(Soviet Union) Konstantin Shcherbakov	N/A	N/A	N/A	N/A
N/A	12	(Austria) Erich Schwabl	N/A	N/A	N/A	N/A
N/A	20	(Italy) Giacomo Aimoni	N/A	N/A	N/A	N/A
N/A	22	(Hungary) Mihály Gellér	N/A	N/A	N/A	N/A
N/A	27	(Czechoslovakia) Karel Kodejška	N/A	N/A	N/A	N/A
N/A	30	(Czechoslovakia) František Rydval	N/A	N/A	N/A	N/A
N/A	31	(Switzerland) Hans Schmid	N/A	N/A	N/A	N/A
N/A	35	(Italy) Albino Bazzana	N/A	N/A	N/A	N/A
N/A	41	(Hungary) László Gellér	N/A	N/A	N/A	N/A
—	16	Free number. In honour to late Heini Klopfer.				

=== Ski Flying Week: Day 3 ===
10:30 AM — 23 March 1969 — Three rounds; two best into official results — Day 1&2 best rounds also calculated into points.

Rank	Bib	Name	1RD	2RD	3RD	Points
1	38	(Czechoslovakia) Jiří Raška	152.0 m	154.0 m	156.0 m	895.0
2	50	(Norway) Bjørn Wirkola	139.0 m	147.0 m	162.0 m	889.0
3	47	(East Germany) Manfred Wolf	142.0 m	149.0 m	165.0 m	8?1.5
4	46	(East Germany) Horst Queck	127.0 m	148.0 m	161.0 m	845.5
5	36	(Czechoslovakia) Zbyněk Hubač	133.0 m	137.0 m	154.0 m	818.0
6	19	(Norway) Lars Grini	125.0 m	139.0 m	139.0 m	796.0
7	22	(East Germany) Rainer Schmidt	139.0 m	143.0 m	148.0 m	784.0
8	40	(Soviet Union) Gariy Napalkov	138.0 m	132.0 m	148.0 m	773.5
9	21	(Czechoslovakia) Bohumil Doležal	149.0 m	150.0 m	160.0 m	773.0
10	11	(East Germany) Christian Kiehl	125.0 m	136.0 m	142.0 m	771.0
11	25	(Austria) Ernst Kröll	123.0 m	149.0 m	143.0 m	754.0
12	42	(Czechoslovakia) Josef Matouš	157.0 m	153.0 m	163.0 m	743.0
13	39	(Socialist Federal Republic of Yugoslavia) Peter Štefančič	147.0 m	125.0 m	150.0 m	738.0
14	34	(Czechoslovakia) Rudolf Hohnl	134.0 m	127.0 m	157.0 m	734.5
15	48	(Austria) Reinhold Bachler	124.0 m	117.0 m	147.0 m	725.0
16	23	(Austria) Walter Schwabl	115.0 m	120.0 m	124.0 m	721.5
17	29	(Soviet Union) Koba Zakadze	133.0 m	127.0 m	136.0 m	715.5
18	32	(Poland) Józef Przybyła	143.0 m	121.0 m	143.0 m	713.5
19	41	(Socialist Federal Republic of Yugoslavia) Branko Dolhar	116.0 m	120.0 m	125.0 m	694.5
20	15	(Czechoslovakia) Josef Kraus	115.0 m	136.0 m	140.0 m	692.0
21	24	(Switzerland) Josef Zehnder	111.0 m	119.0 m	118.0 m	676.0
22	44	(Hungary) László Gellér	126.0 m	124.0 m	125.0 m	673.0
23	17	(Czechoslovakia) Rudolf Doubek	114.0 m	117.0 m	135.0 m	672.0
24	35	(Socialist Federal Republic of Yugoslavia) Marjan Mesec	116.0 m	122.0 m	143.0 m	671.0
25	N/A	(United States) Adrian Watt	115.0 m	124.0 m	136.0 m	670.5
26	37	(Austria) Max Golser	117.0 m	112.0 m	124.0 m	668.0
27	18	(West Germany) Henrik Ohlmeyer	114.0 m	116.0 m	138.0 m	665.5
28	49	(Poland) Ryszard Witke	112.0 m	117.0 m	123.0 m	664.5
29	43	(West Germany) Heini Ihle	116.0 m	117.0 m	129.0 m	660.5
30	28	(Hungary) Mihály Gellér	124.0 m	119.0 m	115.0 m	640.0
31	13	(Norway) Bent Tomtum	109.0 m	111.0 m	128.0 m	636.5
32	31	(Socialist Federal Republic of Yugoslavia) Danilo Pudgar	107.0 m	116.0 m	127.0 m	631.5
33	27	(Socialist Federal Republic of Yugoslavia) Ludvik Zajc	110.0 m	118.0 m	138.0 m	628.5
34	33	(Socialist Federal Republic of Yugoslavia) Peter Eržen	115.0 m	110.0 m	106.0 m	623.0
35	12	(Soviet Union) Konstantin Scherbakov	103.0 m	107.0 m	116.0 m	609.5
36	14	(Poland) Stanislaw Kubica	123.0 m	122.0 m	128.0 m	606.5
37	9	(Socialist Federal Republic of Yugoslavia) Marjan Pečar	107.0 m	113.0 m	123.0 m	605.5
38	10	(Czechoslovakia) Dalibor Motejlek	101.0 m	111.0 m	120.0 m	601.5
39	7	(Socialist Federal Republic of Yugoslavia) Stanko Smolej	102.0 m	101.0 m	127.0 m	589.5
40	6	(Austria) Erich Schwabl	106.0 m	100.0 m	110.0 m	580.5
41	1	(Czechoslovakia) Jozef Metelka	104.0 m	113.0 m	116.0 m	577.0
42	5	(Austria) Willy Schuster	111.0 m	107.0 m	127.0 m	562.5
	8	(Socialist Federal Republic of Yugoslavia) Janez Jurman	112.0 m	113.0 m	126.0 m	562.5
44	45	(Italy) Albino Bazzana	97.0 m	104.0 m	118.0 m	552.0
45	4	(Socialist Federal Republic of Yugoslavia) Oto Giacomelli	103.0 m	97.0 m	103.0 m	535.0
46	2	(Socialist Federal Republic of Yugoslavia) Andrej Nahtigal	92.0 m	94.0 m	103.0 m	514.0
47	26	(Italy) Giacomo Aimoni	101.0 m	97.0 m	—	494.0
48	3	(East Germany) Jürgen Dommerich	—	—	—	449.0
49	—	(Czechoslovakia) František Rydval	—	—	—	224.0
50	—	(Switzerland) Richard Pfiffner	—	—	—	198.0
51	—	(Czechoslovakia) Ladislav Divila	—	—	—	152.5
52	30	(Switzerland) Hans Schmid	—	—	—	138.0
53	—	(Czechoslovakia) František Novák	—	—	—	111.5
54	—	(Socialist Federal Republic of Yugoslavia) Marjan Prelovšek	—	—	—	92.5
N/A	—	(United States) Greg Swor	—	—	—	N/A
N/A	20	(Czechoslovakia) Karel Kodejška	—	—	—	N/A
—	16	Free number. In honour to late Heini Klopfer.				

Best round for final result
Best round for final result & fall
World record
Fall or touch

== Official results ==
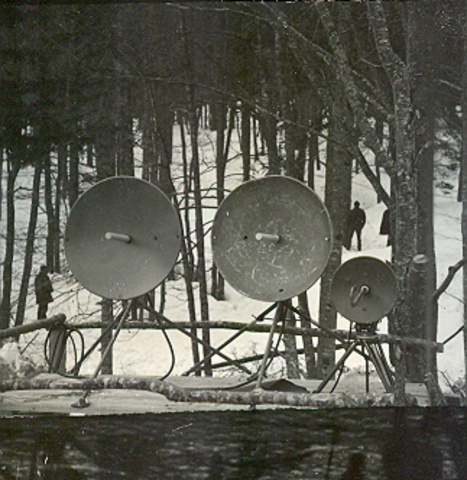
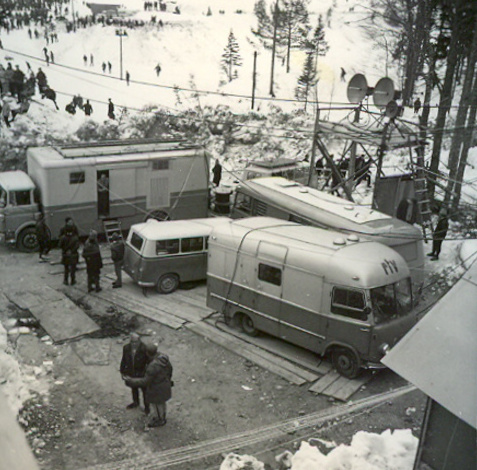
RTV broadcasting crew and equipment.

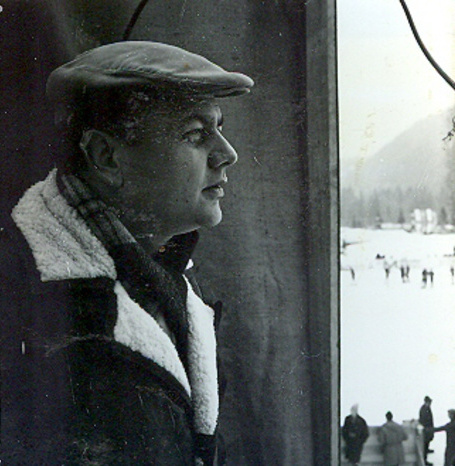
Beno Hvala, Slovenian legendary Planica TV director and inventor of sports slowmotion.

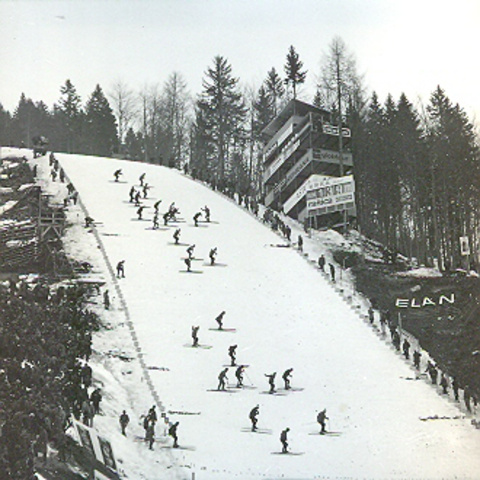
Hill preparations.

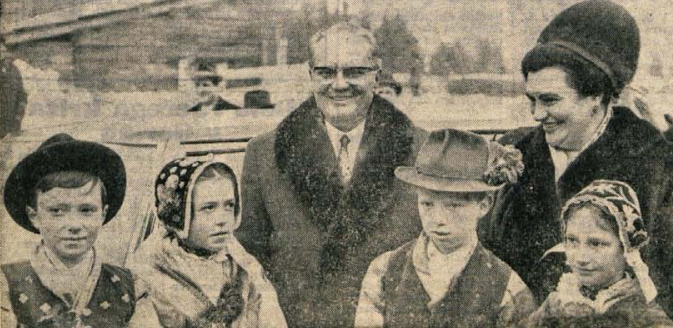
President Tito and Jovanka Broz at one of their many occasions visiting Planica in 1969.

Five rounds counted into official results — one best round (D1) + two best rounds (D2) + two best rounds (D3).

Rank	Name	21 March	22 March		23 March		Points
Rank	Name	1RD	2RD	3RD	4RD	5RD	Points
1	(Czechoslovakia) Jiří Raška	148.0 m	156.0 m	164.0 m	154.0 m	156.0 m	895.0
2	(Norway) Bjørn Wirkola	156.0 m	160.0 m	162.0 m	147.0 m	162.0 m	889.0
3	(East Germany) Manfred Wolf	132.0 m	156.0 m	159.0 m	142.0 m	165.0 m	8?1.0
4	(East Germany) Horst Queck	149.0 m	145.0 m	146.0 m	148.0 m	161.0 m	845.5
5	(Czechoslovakia) Zbyněk Hubač	136.0 m	147.0 m	150.0 m	137.0 m	154.0 m	818.0
6	(Norway) Lars Grini	146.0 m	147.0 m	134.0 m	139.0 m	139.0 m	796.0
7	(East Germany) Rainer Schmidt	132.0 m	146.0 m	145.0 m	139.0 m	143.0 m	784.0
8	(Soviet Union) Gari Napalkov	154.0 m	135.0 m	133.0 m	138.0 m	148.0 m	773.5
9	(Czechoslovakia) Bohumil Doležal	N/A	138.0 m	137.0 m	150.0 m	160.0 m	773.0
10	(East Germany) Christian Kiehl	130.0 m	154.0 m	142.0 m	136.0 m	142.0 m	771.0
11	(Austria) Ernst Kröll	126.0 m	129.0 m	132.0 m	149.0 m	143.0 m	754.0
12	(Czechoslovakia) Josef Matouš	151.0 m	143.0 m	148.0 m	157.0 m	153.0 m	743.0
13	(Socialist Federal Republic of Yugoslavia) Peter Štefančič	126.0 m	118.0 m	122.0 m	147.0 m	150.0 m	738.0
14	(Czechoslovakia) Rudolf Höhnl	123.0 m	135.0 m	134.0 m	134.0 m	157.0 m	734.5
15	(Austria) Reinhold Bachler	132.0 m	124.0 m	126.0 m	124.0 m	147.0 m	725.0
16	(Austria) Walter Schwabl	128.0 m	133.0 m	147.0 m	120.0 m	124.0 m	721.5
17	(Soviet Union) Koba Zakadze	124.0 m	119.0 m	133.0 m	133.0 m	127.0 m	715.5
18	(Poland) Józef Przybyła	121.0 m	132.0 m	127.0 m	143.0 m	143.0 m	713.5
19	(Socialist Federal Republic of Yugoslavia) Branko Dolhar	121.0 m	136.0 m	135.0 m	120.0 m	125.0 m	694.5
20	(Czechoslovakia) Josef Kraus	125.0 m	124.0 m	123.0 m	115.0 m	136.0 m	692.0
21	(Switzerland) Josef Zehnder	117.0 m	132.0 m	112.0 m	111.0 m	119.0 m	676.0
22	(Hungary) László Gellér	N/A	N/A	N/A	126.0 m	124.0 m	673.0
23	(Czechoslovakia) Rudolf Doubek	121.0 m	115.0 m	124.0 m	117.0 m	135.0 m	672.0
24	(Socialist Federal Republic of Yugoslavia) Marjan Mesec	118.0 m	122.0 m	120.0 m	122.0 m	143.0 m	671.0
25	(United States) Adrian Watt	128.0 m	117.0 m	119.0 m	124.0 m	136.0 m	670.5
26	(Austria) Max Golser	N/A	132.0 m	126.0 m	117.0 m	124.0 m	668.0
27	(West Germany) Henrik Ohlmeyer	N/A	124.0 m	119.0 m	116.0 m	138.0 m	665.5
28	(Poland) Ryszard Witke	133.0 m	112.0 m	125.0 m	117.0 m	123.0 m	664.5
29	(West Germany) Heini Ihle	112.0 m	147.0 m	118.0 m	117.0 m	129.0 m	660.5
30	(Hungary) Mihály Gellér	N/A	N/A	N/A	124.0 m	119.0 m	640.0
31	(Norway) Bent Tomtum	N/A	N/A	N/A	111.0 m	128.0 m	636.5
32	(Socialist Federal Republic of Yugoslavia) Danilo Pudgar	111.0 m	124.0 m	101.0 m	116.0 m	127.0 m	631.5
33	(Socialist Federal Republic of Yugoslavia) Ludvik Zajc	96.0 m	118.0 m	110.0 m	118.0 m	138.0 m	628.5
34	(Socialist Federal Republic of Yugoslavia) Peter Eržen	102.0 m	119.0 m	117.0 m	115.0 m	110.0 m	623.0
35	(Soviet Union) Konstantin Scherbakov	N/A	N/A	N/A	107.0 m	116.0 m	609.5
36	(Poland) Stanislaw Kubica	121.0 m	124.0 m	133.0 m	123.0 m	128.0 m	606.5
37	(Socialist Federal Republic of Yugoslavia) Marjan Pečar	115.0 m	109.0 m	101.0 m	113.0 m	123.0 m	605.5
38	(Czechoslovakia) Dalibor Motejlek	N/A	N/A	N/A	111.0 m	120.0 m	601.5
39	(Socialist Federal Republic of Yugoslavia) Stanko Smolej	107.0 m	104.0 m	109.0 m	101.0 m	127.0 m	589.5
40	(Austria) Erich Schwabl	N/A	N/A	N/A	106.0 m	110.0 m	580.5
41	(Czechoslovakia) Jozef Metelka	N/A	N/A	N/A	113.0 m	116.0 m	577.0
42	(Austria) Willy Schuster	N/A	N/A	N/A	111.0 m	127.0 m	562.5
	(Socialist Federal Republic of Yugoslavia) Janez Jurman	118.0 m	106.0 m	110.0 m	113.0 m	126.0 m	562.5
44	(Italy) Albino Bazzana	N/A	N/A	N/A	104.0 m	118.0 m	552.0
45	(Socialist Federal Republic of Yugoslavia) Otto Giacomelli	96.0 m	103.0 m	105.0 m	103.0 m	97.0 m	535.0
46	(Socialist Federal Republic of Yugoslavia) Andrej Nahtigal	98.0 m	102.0 m	94.0 m	94.0 m	103.0 m	514.0
47	(Italy) Giacomo Aimoni	N/A	N/A	N/A	101.0 m	97.0 m	494.0
48	(East Germany) Jürgen Dommerich	137.0 m	128.0 m	143.0 m	—	—	449.0
49	(Czechoslovakia) František Rydval	124.0 m	N/A	N/A	—	—	224.0
50	(Switzerland) Richard Pfiffner	N/A	N/A	N/A	—	—	198.0
51	(Czechoslovakia) Ladislav Divila	130.0 m	N/A	N/A	—	—	152.5
52	(Switzerland) Hans Schmid	N/A	N/A	N/A	—	—	138.0
53	(Czechoslovakia) František Novák	N/A	N/A	N/A	—	—	111.5
54	(Socialist Federal Republic of Yugoslavia) Marjan Prelovšek	N/A	N/A	N/A	—	—	92.5
N/A	(Czechoslovakia) Karel Kodejška	N/A	N/A	N/A	N/A	N/A	N/A
N/A	(United States) Greg Swor	N/A	N/A	N/A	N/A	N/A	N/A

== Ski flying world records ==
Date	Name	Country	Metres	Feet
21 March 1969	Bjørn Wirkola	Norway	156	512
22 March 1969	Jiří Raška	Czechoslovakia	156	512
22 March 1969	Bjørn Wirkola	Norway	160	525
22 March 1969	Jiří Raška	Czechoslovakia	164	538
23 March 1969	Manfred Wolf	East Germany	165	541
