= Ski jumping at the 1968 Winter Olympics – Large hill individual =

Men's large hill individual at the X Olympic Winter Games
- Pictogram for ski jumping
- Venue: Saint-Nizier-du-Moucherotte
- Dates: 18 February 1968
- Competitors: 58 from 17 nations
- Winning score: 219.9

Medalists
1st place, gold medalist(s)		Vladimir Belussov; Soviet Union
2nd place, silver medalist(s)		Jiří Raška; Czechoslovakia
3rd place, bronze medalist(s)		Lars Grini; Norway

The men's large hill individual ski jumping competition for the 1968 Winter Olympics was held in Saint-Nizier-du-Moucherotte. It occurred on 18 February.

== Results ==
Rank	Athlete	Country	Jump 1	Jump 2	Total
1st place, gold medalist(s)	Vladimir Belussov	Soviet Union	118.0	113.3	231.3
2nd place, silver medalist(s)	Jiří Raška	Czechoslovakia	116.3	113.1	229.4
3rd place, bronze medalist(s)	Lars Grini	Norway	111.5	102.8	214.3
4	Manfred Queck	East Germany	104.0	108.8	212.8
5	Bent Tomtum	Norway	108.3	103.9	212.2
6	Reinhold Bachler	Austria	107.3	103.4	210.7
7	Wolfgang Stöhr	East Germany	106.0	99.9	205.9
8	Anatoly Zheglanov	Soviet Union	108.5	97.2	205.7
9	Ludvik Zajc	Yugoslavia	104.0	99.8	203.8
10	Gilbert Poirot	France	103.7	100.0	203.7
11	Gary Napalkov	Soviet Union	107.0	96.1	203.1
12	Rudolf Höhnl	Czechoslovakia	107.3	95.5	202.8
13	Jan Olaf Roaldset	Norway	109.6	93.0	202.6
14	Józef Przybyła	Poland	106.1	93.1	199.2
15	Dieter Neuendorf	East Germany	100.6	98.2	198.8
16	Giacomo Aimoni	Italy	98.1	97.2	195.3
17	Alain Macle	France	93.7	100.3	194.0
18	Takashi Fujisawa	Japan	116.8	75.9	192.7
19	László Gellér	Hungary	98.9	92.4	191.3
20	Akitsugu Konno	Japan	95.5	95.6	191.1
20	Yukio Kasaya	Japan	97.3	93.8	191.1
22	Max Golser	Austria	98.9	91.5	190.4
23	Bjørn Wirkola	Norway	102.1	87.2	189.3
24	Veikko Kankkonen	Finland	94.2	94.7	188.9
25	Zbyněk Hubač	Czechoslovakia	101.4	87.2	188.6
26	Seiji Aochi	Japan	94.6	90.4	185.0
27	František Rydval	Czechoslovakia	95.2	89.6	184.8
28	Sepp Lichtenegger	Austria	90.8	93.8	184.6
29	Günther Göllner	West Germany	96.6	86.9	183.5
30	Erwin Fiedor	Poland	96.2	83.5	179.7
31	Ryszard Witke	Poland	89.8	89.6	179.4
32	Thord Karlsson	Sweden	92.3	86.9	179.2
33	Henrik Ohlmeyer	West Germany	92.6	85.3	177.9
34	Bill Bakke	United States	90.1	85.4	175.5
35	Jay Rand	United States	90.9	83.8	174.7
36	Franz Keller	West Germany	93.6	80.5	174.1
37	Kurt Elimä	Sweden	88.9	85.1	174.0
38	Peter Štefančič	Yugoslavia	94.0	79.4	173.4
39	Marjan Pečar	Yugoslavia	93.8	79.0	172.8
40	Seppo Reijonen	Finland	84.7	85.4	170.1
41	Vladimir Smirnov	Soviet Union	89.1	80.8	169.9
42	John Balfanz	United States	83.7	86.1	169.8
43	Jay Martin	United States	81.4	82.4	163.8
44	Peter Eržen	Yugoslavia	103.8	57.9	161.7
45	Józef Kocyan	Poland	72.4	86.6	159.0
46	Heini Ihle	West Germany	73.7	82.7	156.4
47	Josef Zehnder	Switzerland	81.5	71.7	153.2
48	Baldur Preiml	Austria	66.1	86.2	152.3
49	Topi Mattila	Finland	56.4	94.1	150.5
50	Juhani Ruotsalainen	Finland	71.6	77.6	149.2
50	Maurice Arbez	France	83.2	66.0	149.2
52	Mats Östman	Sweden	76.6	72.2	148.8
53	Kjell Sjöberg	Sweden	86.1	59.1	145.2
54	Michel Saint Lezer	France	80.6	62.3	142.9
55	Ulf Kvendbo	Canada	69.5	69.2	138.7
56	Mihály Gellér	Hungary	80.6	57.2	137.8
57	John McInnes	Canada	58.5	61.8	120.3
58	Claude Trahan	Canada	40.0	51.0	91.0
