= Ski jumping at the 1968 Winter Olympics – Normal hill individual =

Men's normal hill individual at the X Olympic Winter Games
- Pictogram for ski jumping
- Venue: Autrans
- Dates: February 11, 1968
- Competitors: 58 from 17 nations
- Winning score: 216.5

Medalists
1st place, gold medalist(s)		Jiří Raška; Czechoslovakia
2nd place, silver medalist(s)		Reinhold Bachler; Austria
3rd place, bronze medalist(s)		Baldur Preiml; Austria

The men's normal hill individual ski jumping competition for the 1968 Winter Olympics was held at Autrans. It occurred on 11 February.

== Results ==
Rank	Athlete	Country	Jump 1	Jump 2	Total
1st place, gold medalist(s)	Jiří Raška	Czechoslovakia	115.2	101.3	216.5
2nd place, silver medalist(s)	Reinhold Bachler	Austria	107.8	106.4	214.2
3rd place, bronze medalist(s)	Baldur Preiml	Austria	113.8	98.8	212.6
4	Bjørn Wirkola	Norway	108.7	103.3	212.0
5	Topi Mattila	Finland	111.1	100.8	211.9
6	Anatoliy Zheglanov	Soviet Union	110.0	101.5	211.5
7	Dieter Neuendorf	East Germany	108.7	102.6	211.3
8	Vladimir Belussov	Soviet Union	102.9	104.6	207.5
9	Ladislav Divila	Czechoslovakia	107.2	100.1	207.3
10	Gilbert Poirot	France	106.7	100.4	207.1
10	Günther Göllner	West Germany	109.5	97.6	207.1
12	František Rydval	Czechoslovakia	106.4	100.4	206.8
13	Lars Grini	Norway	104.5	101.6	206.1
14	Ludvik Zajc	Yugoslavia	106.2	99.2	205.4
14	Gariy Napalkov	Soviet Union	104.3	101.1	205.4
14	Manfred Queck	East Germany	104.1	101.3	205.4
17	Veikko Kankkonen	Finland	105.9	99.2	205.1
18	Alain Macle	France	104.2	99.8	204.0
19	Zbyněk Hubač	Czechoslovakia	101.7	101.9	203.6
20	Wolfgang Stöhr	East Germany	101.4	97.9	199.3
21	Jan Olaf Roaldset	Norway	99.6	98.1	197.7
22	Heini Ihle	West Germany	102.6	94.8	197.4
23	Yukio Kasaya	Japan	95.4	101.0	196.4
24	Akitsugu Konno	Japan	101.3	95.0	196.3
25	Giacomo Aimoni	Italy	97.8	97.2	195.0
26	Takashi Fujisawa	Japan	100.6	93.9	194.5
27	Józef Przybyła	Poland	96.8	96.9	193.7
28	Henrik Ohlmeyer	West Germany	104.8	88.8	193.6
29	Sepp Lichtenegger	Austria	98.3	94.8	193.1
30	Erwin Fiedor	Poland	102.5	89.3	191.8
31	Jo Inge Bjørnebye	Norway	101.4	89.0	190.4
32	Ryszard Witke	Poland	101.9	88.4	190.3
33	John Balfanz	United States	97.8	91.9	189.7
34	László Gellér	Hungary	98.6	91.0	189.6
35	Józef Kocyan	Poland	95.3	93.7	189.0
36	Max Golser	Austria	102.7	83.3	186.0
37	Kurt Elimä	Sweden	95.4	90.5	185.9
38	Marjan Mesec	Yugoslavia	96.9	88.2	185.1
39	Juhani Ruotsalainen	Finland	92.3	92.1	184.4
40	Bill Bakke	United States	90.0	90.8	180.8
41	Maurice Arbez	France	91.3	87.4	178.7
42	Jay Rand	United States	85.8	92.6	178.4
43	Thord Karlsson	Sweden	85.8	90.0	175.8
44	Adrian Watt	United States	86.9	87.1	174.0
45	Heikki Väisänen	Finland	92.4	78.4	170.8
46	Marjan Pečar	Yugoslavia	104.7	65.4	170.1
47	Masakatsu Asari	Japan	100.8	69.0	169.8
48	Ulf Norberg	Sweden	82.6	84.4	167.0
49	Mats Östman	Sweden	87.8	77.7	165.5
50	Michel Saint Lezer	France	85.0	79.7	164.7
51	Peter Eržen	Yugoslavia	67.6	95.6	163.2
52	Josef Zehnder	Switzerland	65.4	88.8	154.2
53	Ulf Kvendbo	Canada	75.2	78.1	153.3
54	Bernd Karwofsky	East Germany	98.5	53.0	151.5
55	Vladimir Smirnov	Soviet Union	89.5	58.8	148.3
55	John McInnes	Canada	75.7	72.6	148.3
57	Claude Trahan	Canada	74.2	56.4	130.6
58	Mihály Gellér	Hungary	45.2	83.8	129.0
