= FIS Ski Flying World Championships 1972 =

1972 edition of the FIS Ski-Flying World Championships

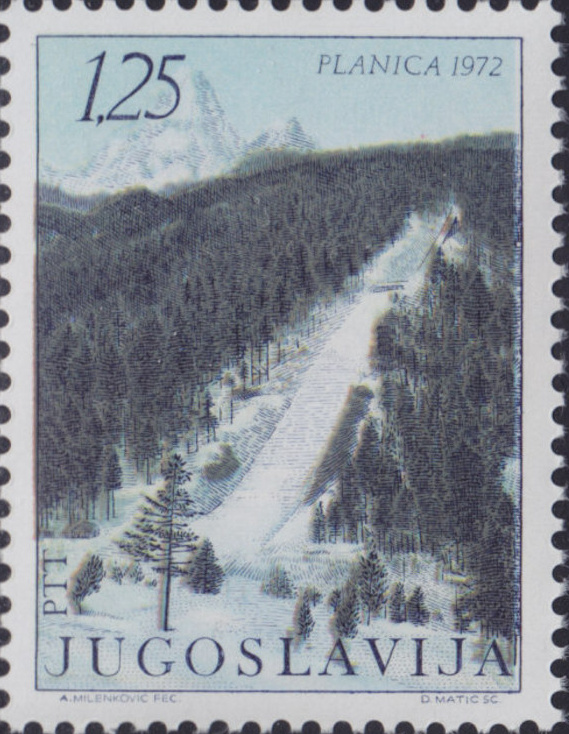
- Venue: Velikanka bratov Gorišek K165
- Date: 25 March 1972
- Competitors: 48 from 14 nations
- Winning score: 427.5

Medalists
gold medal	Walter Steiner	Switzerland
silver medal	Heinz Wossipiwo	East Germany
bronze medal	Jiří Raška	Czechoslovakia

The FIS Ski Flying World Ski Championships 1972, the first ever ski flying world championships took place on 25 March 1972 in Planica, Yugoslavia. A total of 110,000 people has gathered in three days.

== Schedule ==
Date	Event	Rounds	Longest jump of the day	Visitors
22 March 1972	Hill test	2	canceled due to warm weather	—
24 March 1972	Official training	3	162 metres (531 ft) by Juhani Ruotsalainen	20,000
25 March 1972	Competition, Day 1	3	158 metres (518 ft) by Walter Steiner	40,000
26 March 1972	Competition, Day 2	1	153 metres (502 ft) by Jochen Danneberg (V)	50,000

== Competition ==
On 22 March 1972 hill test was originally scheduled, but hill wasn't ready yet to be used due to warm weather and was canceled. A few training jumps were performed at neighbour Bloudkova velikanka.

On 24 March 1972 first ever ski flying world championships was officially opened with official training in front of 20,000 visitors. Three rounds were on schedule; trial round and two rounds for official training which would be valid as official championships final results if jumping would be impossible due to unpredicted weather conditions over the weekend competition day.

On 25 March 1972 first day of competition was in progress in front of 40,000 people. Walter Steiner was leading after first day and two rounds (155 and 158 metres).

On 26 March 1972 second day of competition was on schedule with crowd over 50,000 people. Competition was canceled after trial round, due to unstable wind. Results from previous day counted as official.

=== Official training ===
10:00 AM — 24 March 1972 — Two rounds — chronological order incomplete

Rank	Bib	Name	1RD	2RD	Points
1	43	(East Germany) Heinz Wossipiwo	153.0 m	148.0 m	408.0
2	56	(Switzerland) Walter Steiner	148.0 m	163.0 m	399.0
3	57	(Finland) Juhani Ruotsalainen	162.0 m	129.0 m	395.0
4	23	(Czechoslovakia) Bohumil Doležal	132.0 m	154.0 m	394.0
5	24	(East Germany) Henry Glaß	130.0 m	153.0 m	394.0
6	14	(Czechoslovakia) Jaromír Liďák	138.0 m	145.0 m	390.5
7	53	(Czechoslovakia) Jiří Raška	143.0 m	138.0 m	390.5
8	36	(Czechoslovakia) Karel Kodejška	153.0 m	128.0 m	390.0
9	38	(Socialist Federal Republic of Yugoslavia) Danilo Pudgar	145.0 m	129.0 m	379.0
10	5	(East Germany) Dietmar Aschenbach	129.0 m	137.0 m	367.5
11	48	(East Germany) Manfred Wolf	155.0 m	128.0 m	362.0
12	40	(Switzerland) Josef Zehnder	126.0 m	129.0 m	357.0
13	42	(Austria) Reinhold Bachler	126.0 m	129.0 m	356.5
14	58	(Austria) Max Golser	122.0 m	133.0 m	352.5
15	4	(Soviet Union) Aleksandr Ivannikov	133.0 m	115.0 m	352.5
16	45	(Socialist Federal Republic of Yugoslavia) Marjan Mesec	129.0 m	120.0 m	350.0
17	55	(Socialist Federal Republic of Yugoslavia) Peter Štefančič	120.0 m	127.0 m	345.5
18	16	(East Germany) Jochen Danneberg	113.0 m	140.0 m	345.5
19	46	(Soviet Union) Yury Kalinin	129.0 m	119.0 m	342.5
20	11	(Soviet Union) Anatoliy Zheglanov	131.0 m	120.0 m	342.0
21	54	(Poland) Adam Krzysztofiak	116.0 m	124.0 m	342.0
22	51	(Soviet Union) Gariy Napalkov	119.0 m	119.0 m	340.0
23	26	(Austria) Rudi Wanner	120.0 m	123.0 m	338.5
24	34	(Norway) Odd Grette	122.0 m	109.0 m	329.5
25	49	(Canada) Peter Wilson	116.0 m	114.0 m	329.0
26	2	(Finland) Seppo Hyvönen	111.0 m	116.0 m	328.5
27	31	(Socialist Federal Republic of Yugoslavia) Bogdan Norčič	110.0 m	123.0 m	327.5
28	28	(Japan) Seiji Aochi	108.0 m	116.0 m	322.0
29	3	(Norway) Jan Stenbeck	111.0 m	112.0 m	321.5
30	50	(Norway) Frithjof Prydz	104.0 m	110.0 m	318.5
31	30	(Soviet Union) Koba Zakadze	N/A	N/A	N/A
32	37	(Poland) Wojciech Fortuna	N/A	N/A	311.0
33	20	(Austria) Ernst Kröll	N/A	N/A	N/A
34	39	(Finland) Keijo Laiho	N/A	N/A	305.5
35	12	(Norway) Knut Kongsgård	N/A	N/A	303.0
36	33	(Czechoslovakia) Josef Matouš	N/A	N/A	302.0
37	17	(Finland) Seppo Reijonen	N/A	N/A	298.5
38	47	(West Germany) Ernst Wursthorn	N/A	N/A	294.5
39	15	(Canada) Slawomir Kardas	N/A	N/A	395.5
40	9	(Austria) Hans Wallner	N/A	N/A	284.5
44	1	(Socialist Federal Republic of Yugoslavia) Janez Jurman	N/A	N/A	277.0
45	13	(Socialist Federal Republic of Yugoslavia) Drago Pudgar	N/A	N/A	274.5
N/A	6	(United States) Scott Mc Neill	N/A	N/A	N/A
N/A	7	(Poland) Tadeusz Pawlusiak	N/A	N/A	N/A
N/A	8	(Czechoslovakia) Ladislav Divila	N/A	N/A	N/A
N/A	10	(Japan) Mineyuki Mashiko	N/A	N/A	N/A
N/A	18	(Switzerland) Heinrich Müller	N/A	N/A	N/A
N/A	19	(Japan) Akitsugu Konno	N/A	N/A	N/A
N/A	21	(United States) Greg Windsperger	N/A	N/A	N/A
N/A	22	(Poland) Daniel Gasienica	N/A	N/A	N/A
N/A	25	(Canada) Zdenek Mezl	N/A	N/A	N/A
N/A	27	(Austria) Hans Millonig	N/A	N/A	N/A
N/A	29	(Italy) Ezio Damolin	N/A	N/A	N/A
N/A	32	(West Germany) Alfred Grosche	N/A	N/A	N/A
N/A	35	(United States) Ron Steele	N/A	N/A	N/A
N/A	41	(Japan) Yukio Kasaya	N/A	N/A	N/A
N/A	44	(United States) Greg Swor	N/A	N/A	N/A
N/A	52	(Italy) Albino Bazzana	N/A	N/A	N/A

== Official results ==
10:00 AM — 25 March 1972 — Two rounds — chronological order incomplete

Rank	Bib	Name	1st round	2nd round	Points
1st place, gold medalist(s)	44	(Switzerland) Walter Steiner	155.0 m	158.0 m	427.5
2nd place, silver medalist(s)	47	(East Germany) Heinz Wossipiwo	146.0 m	142.0 m	395.0
3rd place, bronze medalist(s)	37	(Czechoslovakia) Jiří Raška	144.0 m	130.0 m	379.0
4	36	(Finland) Juhani Ruotsalainen	131.0 m	140.0 m	376.5
5	5	(Czechoslovakia) Jaromír Liďák	134.0 m	133.0 m	372.0
6	23	(East Germany) Manfred Wolf	124.0 m	137.0 m	361.5
7	22	(Soviet Union) Yury Kalinin	131.0 m	124.0 m	361.0
8	10	(Norway) Jan Stenbeck	123.0 m	132.0 m	359.0
9	6	(East Germany) Dietmar Aschenbach	130.0 m	130.0 m	357.0
10	35	(Socialist Federal Republic of Yugoslavia) Peter Štefančič	122.0 m	125.0 m	347.0
11	28	(Norway) Odd Grette	120.0 m	123.0 m	345.0
12	9	(East Germany) Henry Glaß	123.0 m	122.0 m	344.0
13	27	(Japan) Seiji Aochi	132.0 m	131.0 m	340.5
14	16	(Soviet Union) Anatoliy Zheglanov	126.0 m	142.0 m	340.0
15	12	(Austria) Rudi Wanner	113.0 m	129.0 m	339.5
16	33	(Czechoslovakia) Bohumil Doležal	142.0 m	129.0 m	338.5
17	40	(Norway) Frithjof Prydz	114.0 m	120.0 m	337.5
18	17	(Japan) Akitsugu Konno	115.0 m	120.0 m	334.0
19	11	(Socialist Federal Republic of Yugoslavia) Marjan Mesec	110.0 m	121.0 m	328.5
20	26	(Poland) Wojciech Fortuna	114.0 m	117.0 m	328.0
21	43	(Japan) Yukio Kasaya	133.0 m	119.0 m	327.5
22	39	(Canada) Peter Wilson	123.0 m	111.0 m	326.0
23	1	(Socialist Federal Republic of Yugoslavia) Bogdan Norčič	104.0 m	131.0 m	325.5
24	7	(Japan) Mineyuki Mashiko	106.0 m	118.0 m	315.5
25	18	(Switzerland) Heinrich Müller	104.0 m	120.0 m	315.0
26	42	(Poland) Adam Krzysztofiak	125.0 m	117.0 m	314.0
27	34	(Socialist Federal Republic of Yugoslavia) Danilo Pudgar	122.0 m	119.0 m	309.5
28	30	(Finland) Seppo Hyvönen	109.0 m	103.0 m	308.5
29	2	(Norway) Knut Kongsgård	98.0 m	115.0 m	307.5
30	24	(Austria) Max Golser	100.0 m	115.0 m	306.5
31	3	(Soviet Union) Aleksandr Ivannikov	106.0 m	109.0 m	306.5
32	13	(Finland) Seppo Reijonen	100.0 m	110.0 m	306.0
33	29	(Switzerland) Josef Zehnder	115.0 m	103.0 m	299.5
34	8	(Austria) Ernst Kröll	103.0 m	113.0 m	299.0
35	21	(United States) Ron Steele	104.0 m	102.0 m	297.0
36	4	(Finland) Keijo Laiho	96.0 m	106.0 m	296.5
37	20	(Czechoslovakia) Karel Kodejška	109.0 m	122.0 m	295.5
38	15	(Canada) Slawomir Kardas	95.0 m	105.0 m	289.0
39	48	(Soviet Union) Gariy Napalkov	117.0 m	100.0 m	287.0
40	25	(West Germany) Ernst Wursthorn	102.0 m	100.0 m	284.0
41	45	(Austria) Reinhold Bachler	111.0 m	114.0 m	263.0
42	41	(West Germany) Alfred Grosche	116.0 m	112.0 m	260.0
43	32	(Italy) Ezio Damolin	90.0 m	—	101.0
N/A	14	(United States) Greg Windsperger	N/A	N/A	N/A
N/A	19	(Poland) Daniel Gasienica	N/A	N/A	N/A
N/A	31	(Canada) Zdenek Mezl	N/A	N/A	N/A
N/A	38	(United States) Greg Swor	N/A	N/A	N/A
N/A	46	(Italy) Albino Bazzana	N/A	N/A	N/A

== Medal table ==
Rank	Nation	Gold	Silver	Bronze	Total
1	Switzerland (SUI)	1	0	0	1
2	East Germany (GDR)	0	1	0	1
3	Czechoslovakia (TCH)	0	0	1	1
Totals (3 entries)		1	1	1	3
