= Nordic skiing at the 1972 Winter Olympics =

At the 1972 Winter Olympics, ten Nordic skiing events were contested – seven cross-country skiing events, two ski jumping events, and one Nordic combined event.

Nordic skiing discipline	Men's events	Women's events
Cross-country skiing	• 15 km	• 5 km
Cross-country skiing	• 30 km	• 10 km
Cross-country skiing	• 50 km	• 10 km
Cross-country skiing	• 4 × 10 km relay	• 4 × 5 km relay
Ski jumping	• Large hill	none
Ski jumping	• Normal hill	none
Nordic combined	• Individual	none
