= Štefančič =

Štefančič is a South Slavic surname. Notable people with the surname include:

- Jelica Pavličić–Štefančić (born 1954), Croatian sprinter
- Peter Štefančič (born 1947), Slovenian ski jumper
