= Michel Saint Lezer =

French ski jumper

Personal information
- Nationality: French
- Born: 31 August 1946 (age 80) Roggenhouse, France

Sport
- Sport: Ski jumping

Michel Saint Lezer (born 31 August 1946) is a French ski jumper. He competed in the normal hill and large hill events at the 1968 Winter Olympics.
