= Bernd Karwofsky =

German ski jumper (1945–2023)

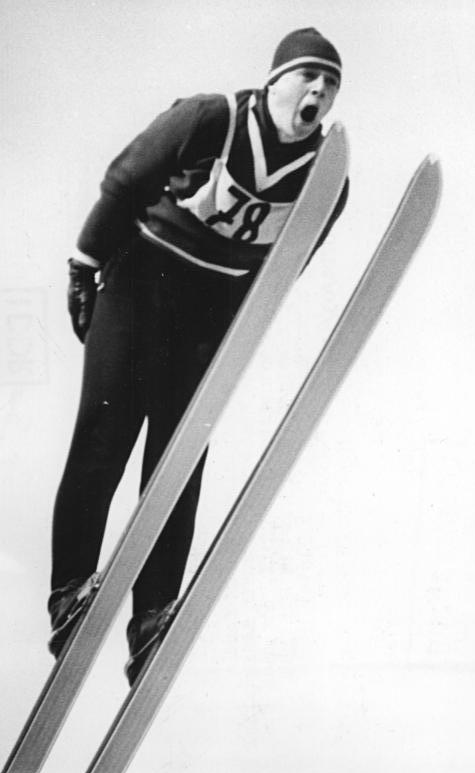
- Karwofsky in 1963

Personal information
- Nationality: German
- Born: 17 March 1945; Klingenthal, Germany
- Died: 31 January 2023 (aged 77)

Sport
- Sport: Ski jumping

Bernd Karwofsky (17 March 1945 – 31 January 2023) was a German ski jumper. He competed in the normal hill event at the 1968 Winter Olympics.
