= Józef Kocyan =

Polish ski jumper

Personal information
- Nationality: Polish
- Born: 14 February 1946 (age 80) Wisła, Poland

Sport
- Sport: Ski jumping

Józef Kocyan (born 14 February 1946) is a Polish ski jumper. He competed in the normal hill and large hill events at the 1968 Winter Olympics.
