= Maurice Arbez =

French ski jumper (1944–2020)

Personal information
- Nationality: French
- Born: 22 September 1944; Les Rousses, France
- Died: 30 October 2020 (aged 76)

Sport
- Sport: Ski jumping

Maurice Arbez (22 September 1944 – 30 October 2020) was a French ski jumper. He competed in the normal hill and large hill events at the 1968 Winter Olympics.
