= Sergei Botschkov =

Soviet ski jumper

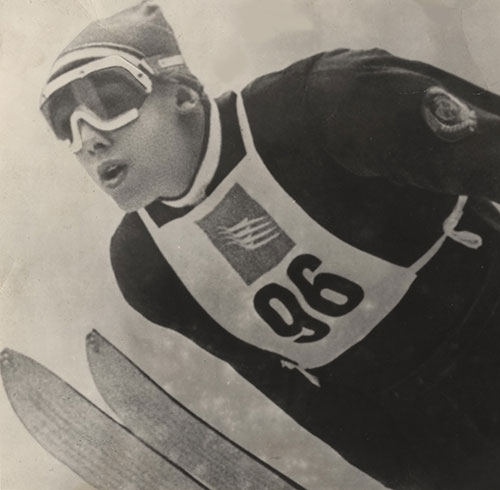
Ski jumper Sergey Bochkov

Sergei Botschkov is a Soviet ski jumper who competed from 1972 to 1974. His lone victory was at Innsbruck during the 1972-73 Four Hills Tournament.
