= Heikki Väisänen =

Finnish ski jumper

Personal information
- Nationality: Finnish
- Born: 7 January 1943 (age 83) Kajaani, Finland

Sport
- Sport: Ski jumping

Heikki Väisänen (born 7 January 1943) is a Finnish ski jumper. He competed in the normal hill event at the 1968 Winter Olympics.
