= Rick Gulyas =

Canadian ski jumper

Rick Gulyas (born 15 December 1952 in Welland, Ontario) is a Canadian former ski jumper who competed in the 1972 Winter Olympics, held in Sapporo, Japan, finishing in 48th position (out of either 56 or 62 competitors - sources disagree) in the men's individual small hill competition. Worldwide, his final standing in the 1971–72 season was 78th overall. Rick is also known as a competitor in International Freestyle skiing events as an aerialist. He made 1st-place finishes in Men's Aerials in a number of competitions in Canada and the US. In addition to his Nordic jumping skills, he also a capable inverted-jump aerialist in Freestyle skiing. (Further editing and information requested)
