= Henrik Ohlmeyer =

German ski jumper

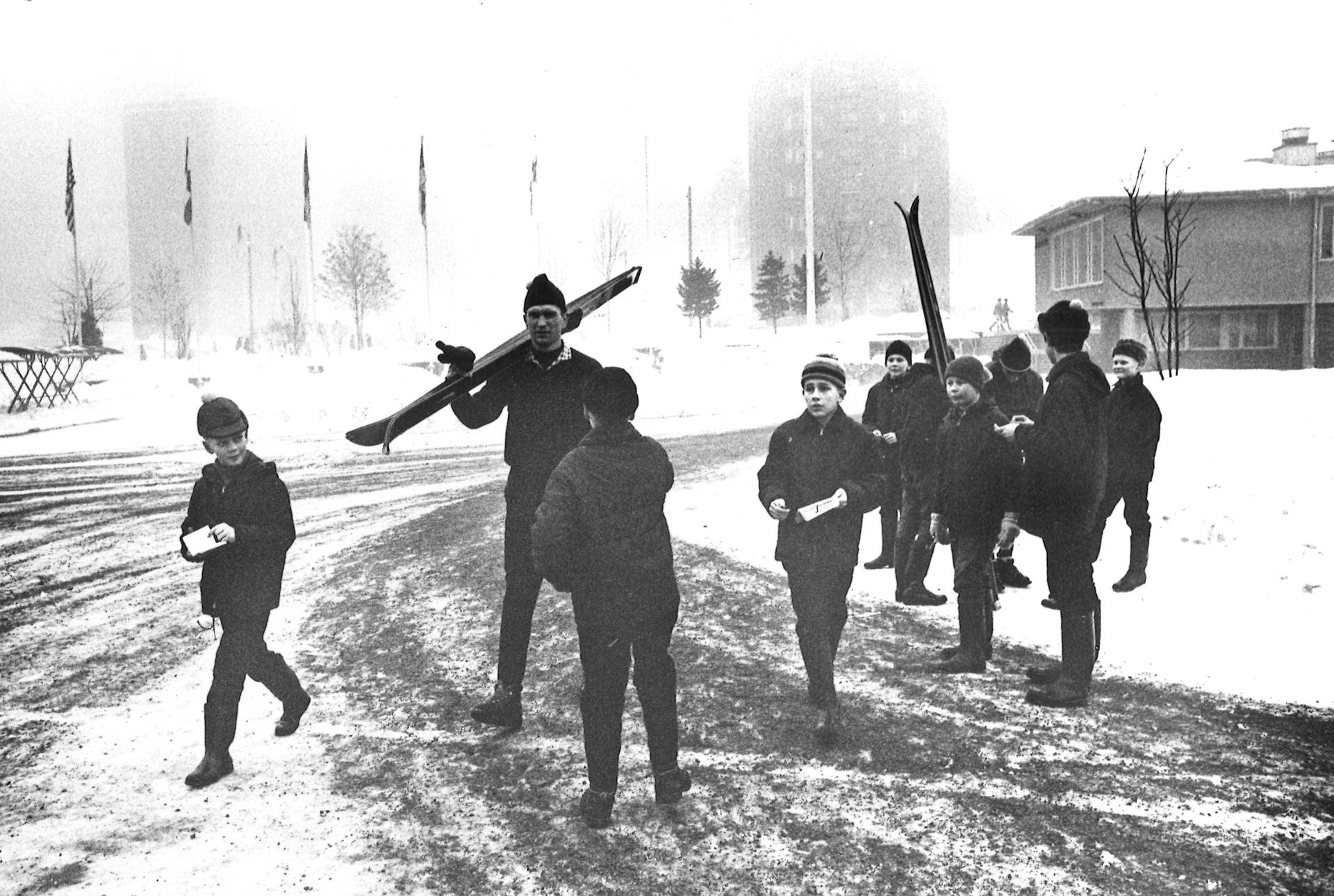
- Henrik Ohlmeyer in 1966

Personal information
- Nationality: German
- Born: 11 February 1946 (age 79); Bischofsgrün, Germany

Sport
- Sport: Ski jumping

Henrik Ohlmeyer (born 11 February 1946) is a German ski jumper. He competed in the normal hill and large hill events at the 1968 Winter Olympics.
