= Vladimir Smirnov (ski jumper) =

Soviet ski jumper

Personal information
- Nationality: Soviet
- Born: 11 June 1947 (age 79) Moscow, Russian SFSR, Soviet Union

Sport
- Sport: Ski jumping

Vladimir Smirnov (born 11 June 1947) is a Soviet ski jumper. He competed in the normal hill and large hill events at the 1968 Winter Olympics.
