= Mats Östman =

Swedish ski jumper

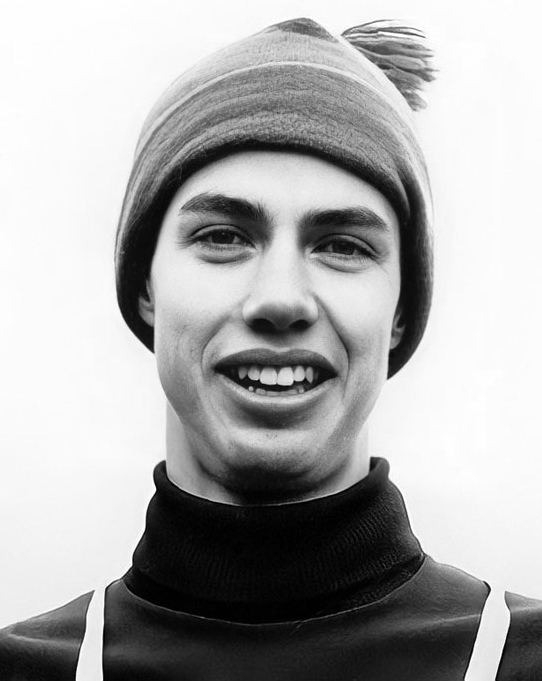

Personal information
- Nationality: Swedish
- Born: 4 October 1946 (age 78); Örnsköldsvik, Sweden

Sport
- Sport: Ski jumping
- Club: IF Friska Viljor

Mats Östman (born 4 October 1946) is a Swedish ski jumper. He competed in the normal hill and large hill events at the 1968 Winter Olympics.
