= Ski jumping at the 1972 Winter Olympics =

Ski jumping at the XI Olympic Winter Games
- Pictogram for ski jumping
- Venue: Okurayama Ski Jump Stadium (large hill) & Miyanomori Ski Jump Stadium (normal hill)
- Dates: 6–11 February 1972
- Competitors: 62 from 16 nations

Ski jumping at the 1972 Winter Olympics consisted of two events held from 6 to 11 February 1972, with the large hill event taking place at Okurayama Ski Jump Stadium, and the normal hill event at Miyanomori Ski Jump Stadium.

== Medal summary ==
=== Medal table ===
Rank	Nation	Gold	Silver	Bronze	Total
1	Japan	1	1	1	3
2	Poland	1	0	0	1
3	Switzerland	0	1	0	1
4	East Germany	0	0	1	1
Totals (4 entries)		2	2	2	6

Japan topped the medal table by sweeping all three medals in the normal hill event, which were their first ever medals in the sport. In fact, every single country that won a medal in Sapporo was winning their first ever ski jumping medal (East Germans had won medals as part of a unified German team in earlier Games).

Yukio Kasaya, winner of the normal hill event, was the first ever Winter Olympic gold medalist for Japan, while Wojciech Fortuna was the first ever Winter gold medalist for Poland.

=== Events ===
Event	Gold		Silver		Bronze	
Normal hill	Yukio Kasaya; Japan	244.2	Akitsugu Konno; Japan	234.8	Seiji Aochi; Japan	229.5
Large hill	Wojciech Fortuna; Poland	219.9	Walter Steiner; Switzerland	219.8	Rainer Schmidt; East Germany	219.3

== Participating NOCs ==
Sixteen nations participated in ski jumping at the Sapporo Games.

- Austria (3)
- Canada (4)
- Finland (4)
- France (4)
- West Germany (3)
- East Germany (5)
- Italy (1)
- Japan (5)
- Norway (5)
- Poland (4)
- Switzerland (4)
- Sweden (2)
- Czechoslovakia (5)
- Soviet Union (5)
- United States (4)
- Yugoslavia (4)
