= Walter Steiner =

Swiss ski jumper

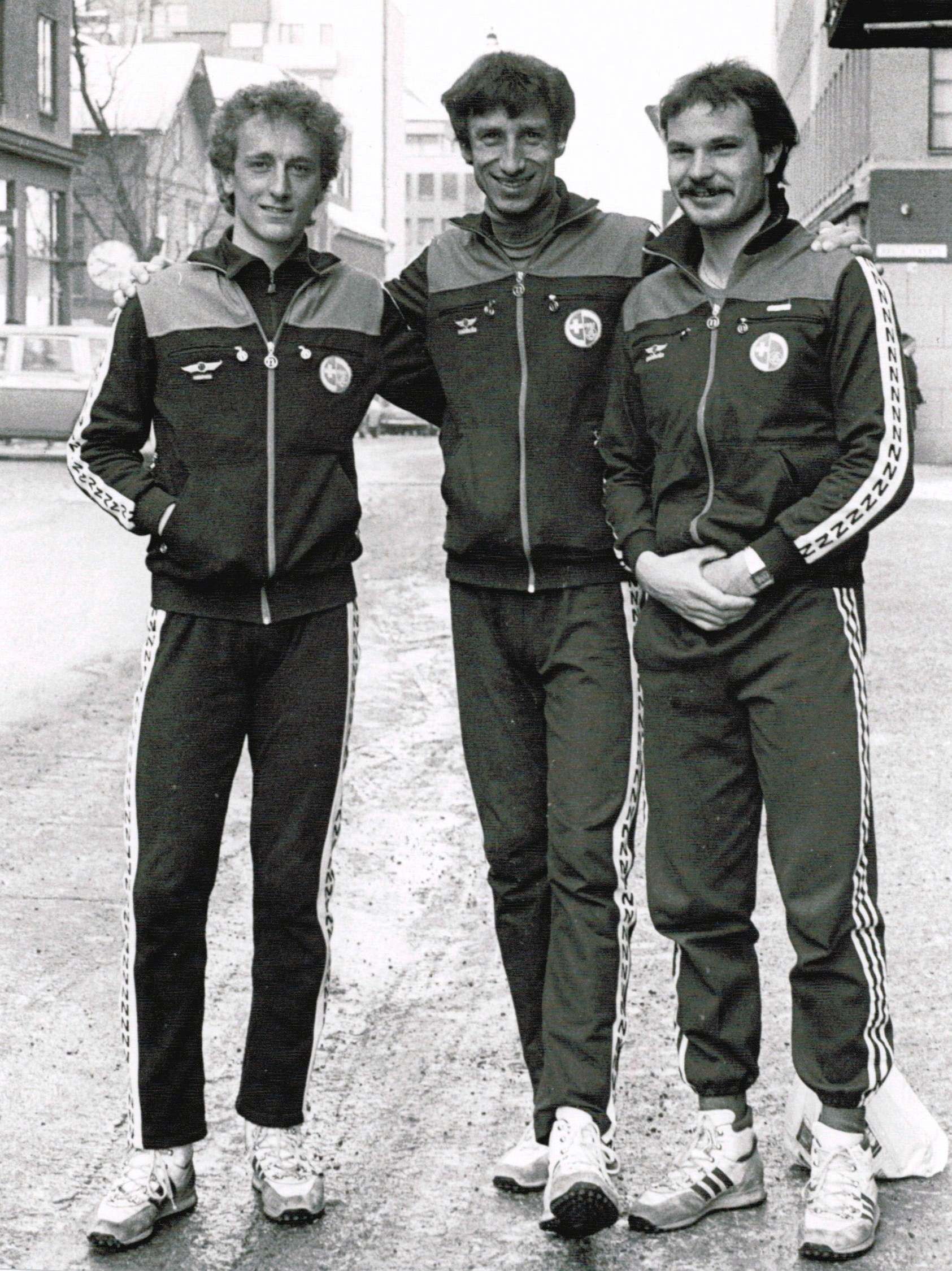
- Paul Egloff, Walter Steiner, Roland Glas, 1982

Personal information
- Nationality: Switzerland
- Born: 15 February 1951 (age 75) Wildhaus, Switzerland
- Height: 184 cm (6 ft 0 in)

Sport
- Sport: Skiing

Achievements and titles
- Personal bests: 169 m (554 ft); Planica, Yugoslavia (15 March 1974)
Medal record
Men's ski jumping
Olympic Games
Silver medal – second place	1972 Sapporo	Individual LH
World Championships
Silver medal – second place	1972 Sapporo	Individual LH
Men's ski flying
World Championships
Gold medal – first place	1972 Planica	Individual
Gold medal – first place	1977 Vikersund	Individual
Silver medal – second place	1973 Oberstdorf	Individual

Walter Steiner (born 15 February 1951) is a Swiss former ski jumper who competed in the 1970s.

== Career ==
Steiner earned a ski jumping silver medal in the Individual large hill at the 1972 Winter Olympics. He also won the ski jumping competition at the Holmenkollen ski festival in 1974 and won the Ski Flying World Championships in 1972 and 1977. Steiner was awarded the Holmenkollen medal in 1977 (shared with Helena Takalo and Hilkka Kuntola). As of 2012 he resides in the Swedish rural town of Falun, working as a gardener.

On 9 March 1973, he crashed at world record distance at 175 metres (574 ft). Again two days later he crashed at record 179 metres (587 ft), both of them achieved in Oberstdorf, West Germany.

On 15 March 1974 he set and tied ski jumping world record distance at 169 metres (554 ft) with Heinz Wossipiwo. Later that day he crashed at 177 metres (581 ft) world record distance; both distances were set on Velikanka bratov Gorišek K165 in Planica, Yugoslavia.

Steiner ended his career in 1978 after several knee injuries.

Although being very successful in ski flying, Steiner often criticized this kind of sport as insecure and even called flying hills "monuments of foolishness". He later worked as a design engineer to make ski jumping hills safer.

In present day he is known in Switzerland as the "bird man".

== Ski jumping world records ==
Date	Hill	Location	Metres	Feet
9 March 1973	Heini-Klopfer-Skiflugschanze K175	Oberstdorf, West Germany	175	574
11 March 1973	Heini-Klopfer-Skiflugschanze K175	Oberstdorf, West Germany	179	587
15 March 1974	Velikanka bratov Gorišek K165	Planica, Yugoslavia	169	554
15 March 1974	Velikanka bratov Gorišek K165	Planica, Yugoslavia	177	581

Not recognized - Crash at world record distance.

== Documentary ==
Steiner is the subject of the 1974 Werner Herzog German-language documentary film The Great Ecstasy of the Woodcarver Steiner, a.k.a. The Great Ecstasy of the Sculptor Steiner (German: Die große Ekstase des Bildschnitzers Steiner). Much of the footage shows Steiner and his psychological struggle at the International Ski Flying Week at Planica where Herzog also appears as commentator.
