= Masakatsu Asari =

Japanese ski jumper

Personal information
- Nationality: Japanese
- Born: 31 July 1945 (age 81) Hokkaido, Japan

Sport
- Sport: Ski jumping

Masakatsu Asari (浅利 正勝, Asari Masakatsu; born 31 July 1945) is a Japanese ski jumper. He competed in the normal hill event at the 1968 Winter Olympics.
