= Claude Trahan =

Canadian ski jumper

Claude Trahan (17 March 1939 – 6 December 1975) was a Canadian ski jumper who competed in the 1968 Winter Olympics. He died in a car accident in 1975.
