= Manfred Queck =

German ski jumper (1941–1977)

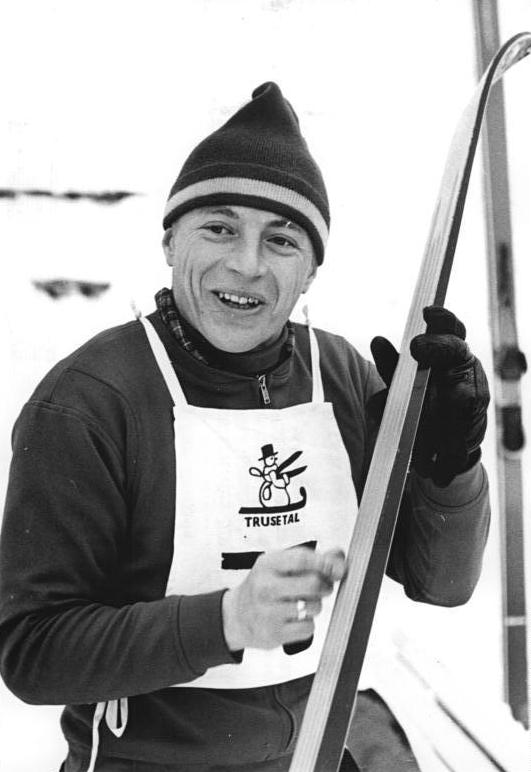
- Queck in 1968

Personal information
- Nationality: German
- Born: 10 August 1941 Johanngeorgenstadt, Germany
- Died: 1 July 1977 (aged 35) Johanngeorgenstadt, East Germany

Sport
- Sport: Ski jumping

Manfred Queck (10 August 1941 – 1 July 1977) was a German ski jumper. He competed in the normal hill and large hill events at the 1968 Winter Olympics.
