= Hiroshi Itagaki =

Japanese ski jumper

Personal information
- Nationality: Japanese
- Born: 27 April 1945 (age 79); Hokkaido, Japan

Sport
- Sport: Ski jumping

Hiroshi Itagaki (板垣 宏志, Itagaki Hiroshi, born 27 April 1945) is a Japanese ski jumper. He competed at the 1968 Winter Olympics, the 1972 Winter Olympics and the 1972 Winter Olympics.
