= Ralph Pöhland =

German Nordic combined skier (1946–2011)

Personal information
- Nationality: German
- Born: 8 June 1946; Klingenthal, Germany
- Died: 7 February 2011 (aged 64); Plauen im Vogtland, Germany

Sport
- Sport: Nordic combined

Ralph Pöhland (8 June 1946 – 7 February 2011) was a German skier. He competed in the Nordic combined event at the 1972 Winter Olympics.
