= Ron Steele (ski jumper) =

American ski jumper (born 1953)

Ron Steele (born August 19, 1953) is an American former ski jumper who competed in the 1972 Winter Olympics.
