= Thord Karlsson =

Swedish ski jumper

Personal information
- Nationality: Swedish
- Born: 4 December 1941; Kiruna, Sweden
- Died: 18 May 2017 (aged 75)

Sport
- Sport: Ski jumping

Thord Karlsson (4 December 1941 – 18 May 2017) was a Swedish ski jumper. He competed in the normal hill and large hill events at the 1968 Winter Olympics.
