= Marjan Pečar =

Slovenian ski jumper (1941–2019)

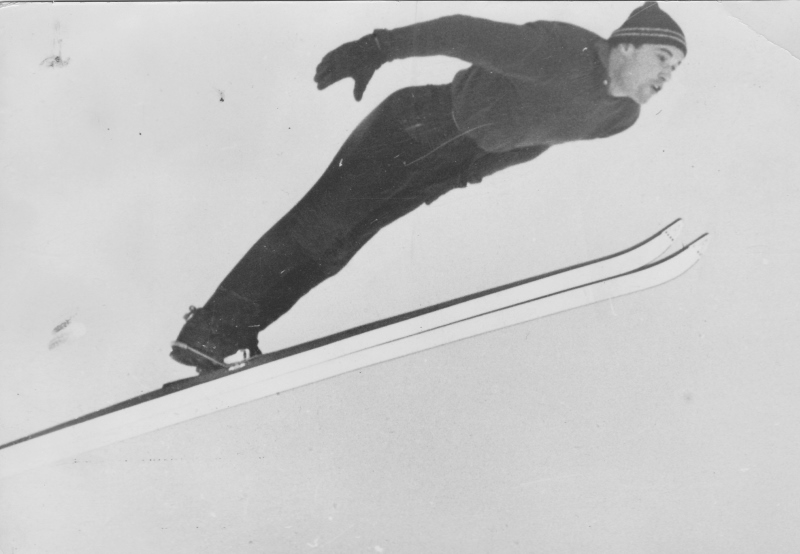
- Marjan Pečar in 1966

Personal information
- Nationality: Slovenian
- Born: 27 January 1941; Mojstrana, Yugoslavia
- Died: 1 August 2019 (aged 78); Bistrica pri Tržiču, Slovenia

Sport
- Sport: Ski jumping

Marjan Pečar (27 January 1941 – 1 August 2019) was a Slovenian ski jumper. He competed in the normal hill and large hill events at the 1968 Winter Olympics.
