= Heinz Wossipiwo =

German former ski jumper (born 1951)

Personal information
- Nationality: East Germany
- Born: 25 January 1951 (age 75) Bad Elster, East Germany

Sport
- Sport: Skiing

Achievements and titles
- Personal bests: 169 m (554 ft); Oberstdorf, West Germany (9 March 1973)
Medal record
Men's ski jumping
World Championships
Silver medal – second place	1974 Falun	Individual LH
Men's ski flying
World Championships
Silver medal – second place	1972 Planica	Individual

Heinz Wossipiwo (born 25 January 1951) is a German former ski jumper who competed from 1971 to 1975, representing East Germany.

== Career ==
He won a silver medal in the individual large hill at the 1974 FIS Nordic World Ski Championships in Falun. Wossipiwo also won a silver medal at the 1972 Ski-flying World Championships.

He also finished second one other time in his career in a normal hill event at Oberstdorf, West Germany in 1973. He also competed at the 1972 Winter Olympics.

On 9 March 1973, he set a world record distance at 169 metres (554 ft) on Heini-Klopfer-Skiflugschanze in Oberstdorf, West Germany.

== Ski jumping world record ==
Date	Hill	Location	Metres	Feet
9 March 1973	Heini-Klopfer-Skiflugschanze K175	Oberstdorf, West Germany	169	554
