= Seiji Aochi =

Japanese ski jumper (1942–2008)

Personal information
- Full name: Seiji Aochi
- Born: June 21, 1942 Otaru, Hokkaido
- Died: August 14, 2008 (aged 66)

Sport
- Sport: Skiing
Medal record
Men's ski jumping
Representing Japan
Olympic Games
Bronze medal – third place	1972 Sapporo	Individual normal hill
World Championships
Bronze medal – third place	1972 Sapporo	Individual normal hill

Seiji Aochi (青地 清二, Aochi Seiji) (June 21, 1942 – August 14, 2008) was a Japanese ski jumper who competed in the early 1970s. His best finish was a bronze medal in the Individual normal hill event at the 1972 Winter Olympics in Sapporo.

Aochi attended Meiji University and then joined Snow Brand Milk Products Company. He joined the company's ski club and later stayed as a mentor to younger skiers.

Aochi died of gastric cancer.
