= Jan Olaf Roaldset =

Norwegian ski jumper (born 1946)

Jan Olaf Roaldset (born 28 March 1946) is a Norwegian ski jumper. He was born in Molde and represented the club IL Hjelset-Fram. He competed at the 1968 Winter Olympics in Grenoble, where he placed 21st in the normal hill and 13th in the large hill.
