= Veikko Kankkonen =

Finnish ski jumper

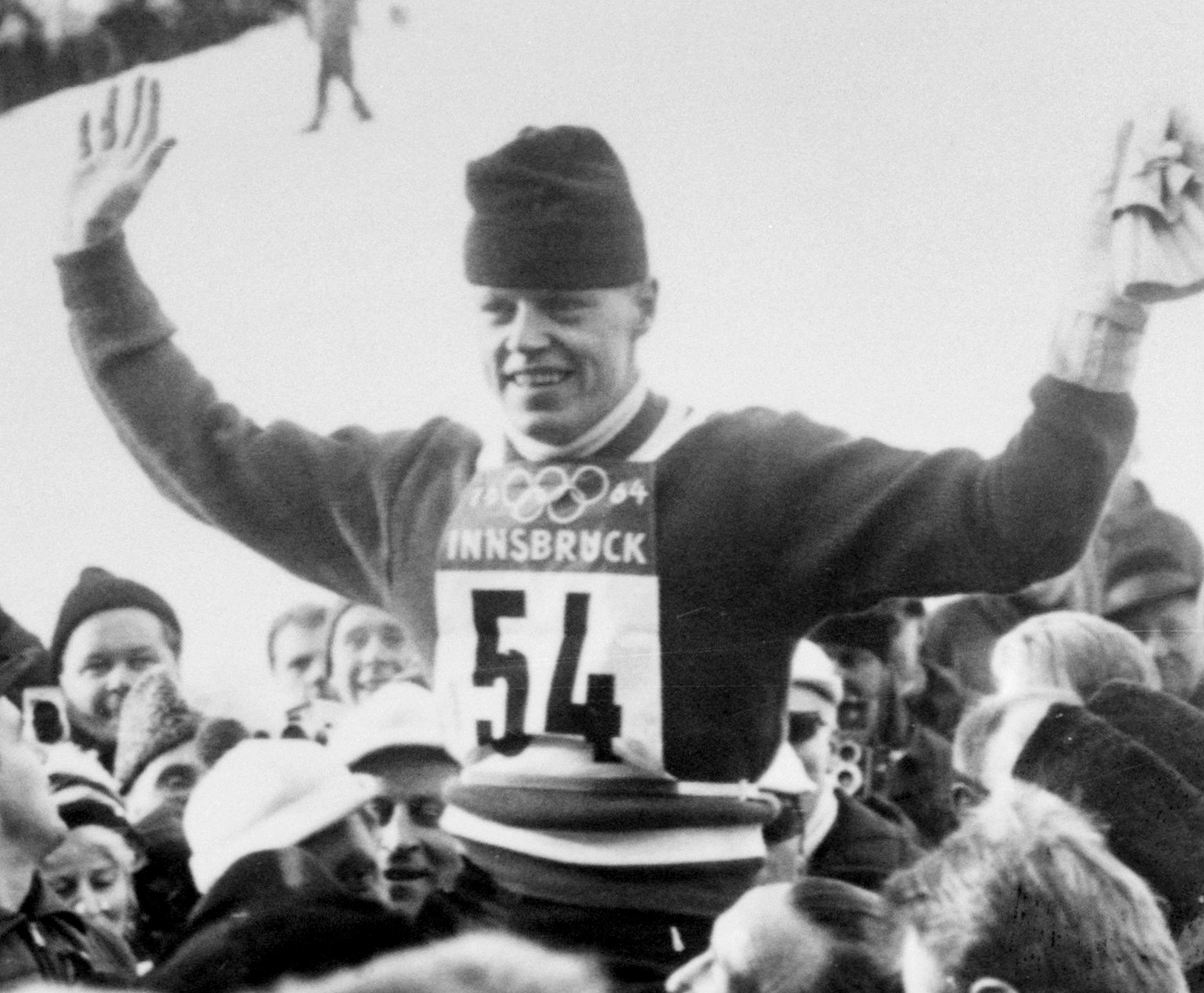
- Veikko Kankkonen after winning the normal hill event at the 1964 Winter Olympics in Innsbruck, Austria

Personal information
- Born: 5 January 1940 (age 86) Sotkamo, Finland
- Height: 174 cm (5 ft 9 in)
- Weight: 75–78 kg (165–172 lb)

Sport
- Sport: Ski jumping
- Club: Lahden Hiihtoseura, Lahti
Medal record
Representing Finland
Olympic Games
Gold medal – first place	1964 Innsbruck	Individual normal hill
Silver medal – second place	1964 Innsbruck	Individual large hill
World Championships
Gold medal – first place	1964 Innsbruck	Individual normal hill
Silver medal – second place	1964 Innsbruck	Individual large hill

Veikko Kankkonen (born 5 January 1940) is a retired Finnish ski jumper who competed at the 1960, 1964 and 1968 Winter Olympics. He won two medals in 1964 with a gold in the individual normal hill and a silver in the individual large hill event. That same year he won the jumping competition at the Holmenkollen ski festival, which also earned him the Holmenkollen medal (shared with Eero Mäntyranta, Georg Thoma, and Halvor Næs). He also won the Four Hills Tournament and served as the flag bearer for Finland at the 1968 Olympics.

Besides skiing Kankkonen played pesäpallo for the Maila-Veikot Lahti club in the national championships of 1963–64. He also regularly competed in golf at the national level, with the best result of fourth place. Kankkonen was a turner by trade and later worked as a ski jumping coach. His son Anssi Kankkonen became a professional golfer, but he also competed in ski jumping and won a national title in 1985.
