= Adrian Watt =

American ski jumper

Adrian Watt (born December 29, 1947, in Omaha, Nebraska) is an American former ski jumper who competed in the 1968 Winter Olympics.
