= Juhani Ruotsalainen =

Finnish ski jumper (1948–2015)

Personal information
- Nationality: Finnish
- Born: 1 April 1948 Iisalmi, Finland
- Died: 2015

Sport
- Sport: Ski jumping

Juhani Ruotsalainen (1 April 1948 – 2015) was a Finnish ski jumper. He competed in the normal hill and large hill events at the 1968 Winter Olympics.
