= Wolfgang Stöhr =

East German ski jumper

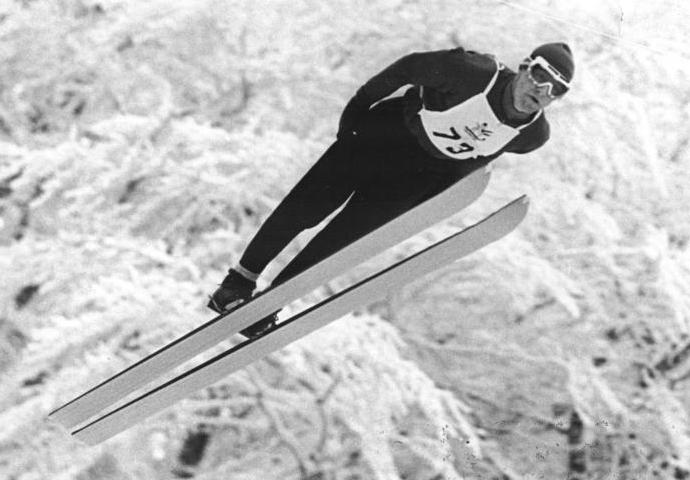
Wolfgang Stöhr in Oberhof during qualification to the 1968 Winter Olympics

Wolfgang Stöhr (born August 26, 1946) was an East German ski jumper who competed from 1966 to 1971. He finished seventh in the individual large hill event at the 1968 Winter Olympics in Grenoble.

Stöhr's best individual finish was eighth in the individual normal hill event in Austria in 1968.
