= Mihály Gellér =

Hungarian ski jumper (1947–2024)

Personal information
- Nationality: Hungarian
- Born: 5 August 1947; Elek, Hungary
- Died: 23 December 2024 (aged 77); Hungary

Sport
- Sport: Ski jumping

Mihály Gellér (5 August 1947 – 23 December 2024) was a Hungarian ski jumper. He competed in the normal hill and large hill events at the 1968 Winter Olympics.
