= Heini Ihle =

German ski jumper

Personal information
- Nationality: German
- Born: 24 April 1941 (age 85) Oberstdorf, Germany

Sport
- Sport: Ski jumping

Heini Ihle (born 24 April 1941) is a German ski jumper. He competed in the normal hill and large hill events at the 1968 Winter Olympics.
