= Rudolf Wanner =

Austrian ski jumper

Rudolf Wanner (born 28 January 1951 in Seefeld in Tirol) is an Austrian former ski jumper who competed during the 1970s. He finished joint-seventh in the individual normal hill event at the 1976 Winter Olympics in Innsbruck.

His best career finish also occurred in 1976 at an individual normal hill event in Innsbruck which took place before the Winter Olympics that same year.
