= František Rydval =

Czech ski jumper (1946–2025)

Personal information
- Nationality: Czech
- Born: 21 February 1946 Liberec, Czechoslovakia
- Died: 1 October 2025 (aged 79)

Sport
- Sport: Ski jumping

František Rydval (21 February 1946 – 1 October 2025) was a Czech ski jumper. He represented Czechoslovakia in the normal hill and large hill events at the 1968 Winter Olympics. Rydval died on 1 October 2025, at the age of 79.
