= Manfred Wolf =

East German ski jumper

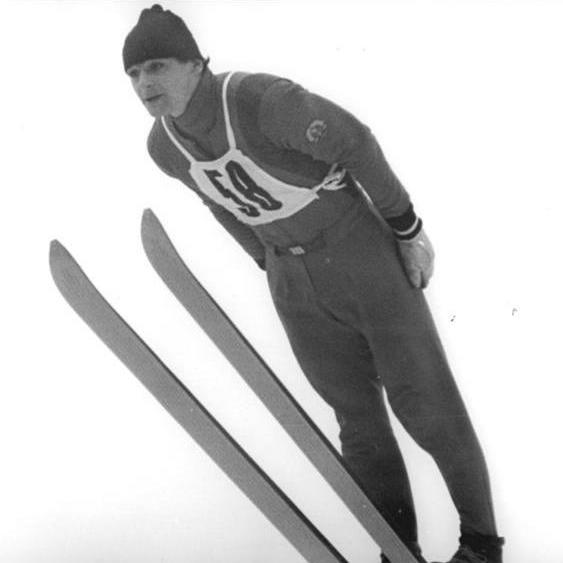
- Manfred Wolf in Oberhof, 1970

Personal information
- Nationality: East Germany
- Born: 11 January 1948 (age 78) Steinbach-Hallenberg, Allied-occupied Germany
- Height: 174 cm (5 ft 9 in)

Sport
- Sport: Skiing
- Club: ASK Vorwärts Oberhof

Achievements and titles
- Personal bests: 165 m (541 ft); Planica, Yugoslavia (23 March 1969)

Manfred Wolf (born 11 January 1948 in Steinbach-Hallenberg) is an East German former ski jumper who competed from 1971 to 1973.

== Career ==
On 23 March 1969, he set the ski jumping world record at 165 metres (541 ft) at the opening of Velikanka bratov Gorišek K153 in Planica, Yugoslavia. It lasted for five years.

He finished fifth in the individual large hill event at the 1972 Winter Olympics in Sapporo. Wolf's best career finish was fourth in a normal hill event in West Germany in 1973.

== Ski jumping world record ==
Date	Hill	Location	Metres	Feet
23 March 1969	Velikanka bratov Gorišek K153	Planica, Yugoslavia	165	541
