= Akitsugu Konno =

Japanese ski jumper (1944–2019)

Personal information
- Born: September 1, 1944 Sapporo, Japan
- Died: September 5, 2019 (aged 75)
Medal record
Men's ski jumping
Representing Japan
Olympic Games
| Silver medal – second place | 1972 Sapporo | K90 individual (70m) |
World Championships
| Silver medal – second place | 1972 Sapporo | K90 individual (70m) |

Akitsugu Konno (金野 昭次, Konno Akitsugu; September 1, 1944 – September 5, 2019) was a Japanese ski jumper who competed in the early 1970s. His best finish was a silver medal in the Individual Normal Hill at the 1972 Winter Olympics in Sapporo.
