= Takashi Fujisawa =

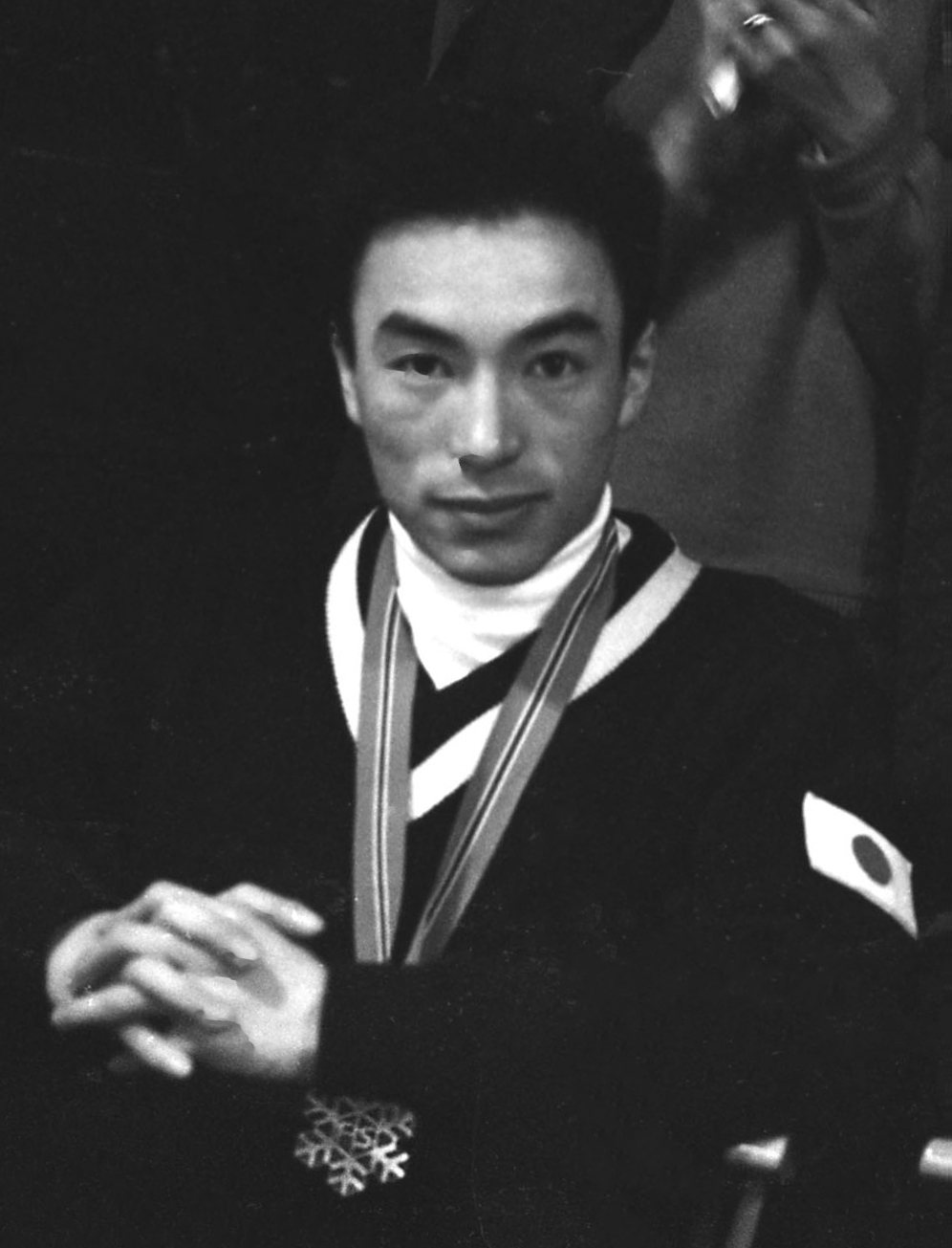
- Fujisawa at the 1966 World Championships

Personal information
- Born: February 7, 1943 (age 83) Yoichi, Hokkaido, Japan
- Height: 160 cm (5 ft 3 in)
- Weight: 55 kg (121 lb)

Sport
- Sport: Ski jumping
- Club: Waseda University; National Land Planning
Medal record
Men's ski jumping
Representing Japan
World Championships
Silver medal – second place	1966 Oslo	Individual large hill

Takashi Fujisawa (藤沢 隆, Fujisawa Takashi; born February 7, 1943) is a retired Japanese ski jumper and Nordic combined skier. He won a silver medal in the individual large hill event at the 1966 FIS Nordic World Ski Championships in Oslo, becoming the first Japanese ski jumper to win a medal at the world championships. He placed 20th in the Nordic combined at the 1964 Winter Olympics and 8th–18th in the large hill event at the 1968–1976 Olympics.
