= Danilo Pudgar =

Slovenian ski jumper (born 1952)

Danilo Pudgar (born 3 May 1952) is a Slovenian former ski jumper who competed from 1971 to 1973 representing Yugoslavia. He earned his best individual career finish of eighth in the individual large hill at the 1972 Winter Olympics in Sapporo.
