= Bohumil Doležal =

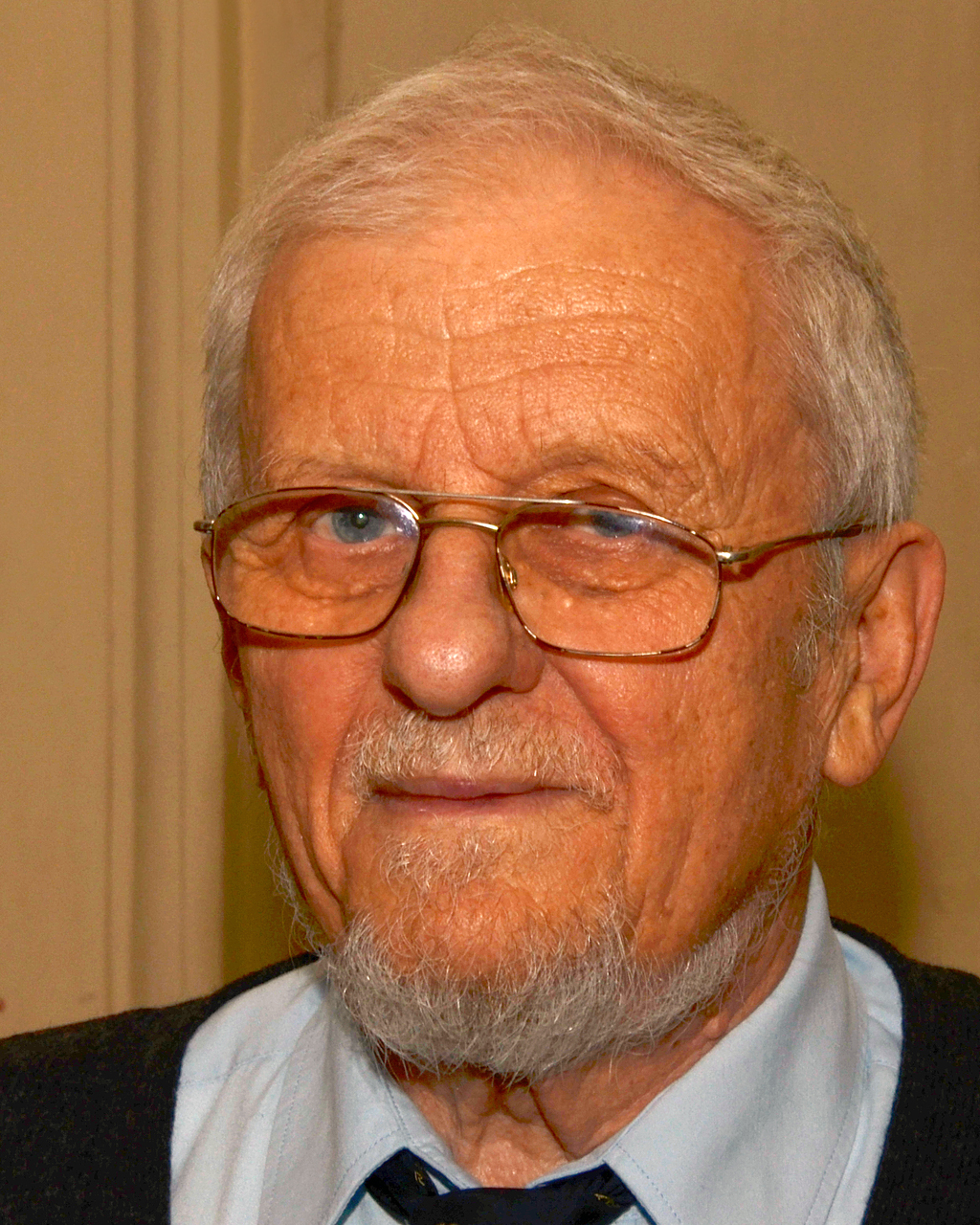
Bohumil Doležal in 2017

Bohumil Doležal (born 17 January 1940) is a Czech literary critic, politician and former dissident. He was a political advisor to Václav Klaus, the former Czech prime minister.

Doležal was born in Prague, and graduated in 1962 after studying Czech and German at Charles University. He wrote literary critiques for the magazine Tvář from 1964 to 1965, when the magazine was cancelled. He later wrote for the magazine after its revival in 1968, made possible by the Prague Spring, until 1969 when Tvář was cancelled again. He first met Václav Klaus in 1968.

For the next twenty years, he worked as a technician and programmer. He signed Charter 77 and was a founding member of the Czechoslovak Helsinki Committee.

After the Velvet revolution of 1989, he was co-opted to the federal chamber of the Czechoslovak parliament. Later he was elected to the chamber.

Around 1992–1993 he worked as the chief political advisor to Václav Klaus (then minister of finance of the Czech and Slovak Federative Republic and after its peaceful split, prime minister of the Czech Republic). After a difference of opinion with Klaus, Doležal moved into academia and started teaching politics and "the history of political thinking" in the Faculty of Social Sciences at Charles University. In addition, he is a well-known activist and supporter of Czech-German reconciliation. His opinions are close to those of German expellees organizations. His writing is also published in various Czech printed and electronic media.
