= Alfred Grosche =

German ski jumper

Personal information
- Nationality: German
- Born: 20 January 1950 (age 76) Winterberg, West Germany

Sport
- Sport: Ski jumping

Alfred Grosche (born 20 January 1950) is a German ski jumper. He competed at the 1972 Winter Olympics and the 1976 Winter Olympics.
