= Rainer Schmidt (ski jumper) =

East German ski jumper

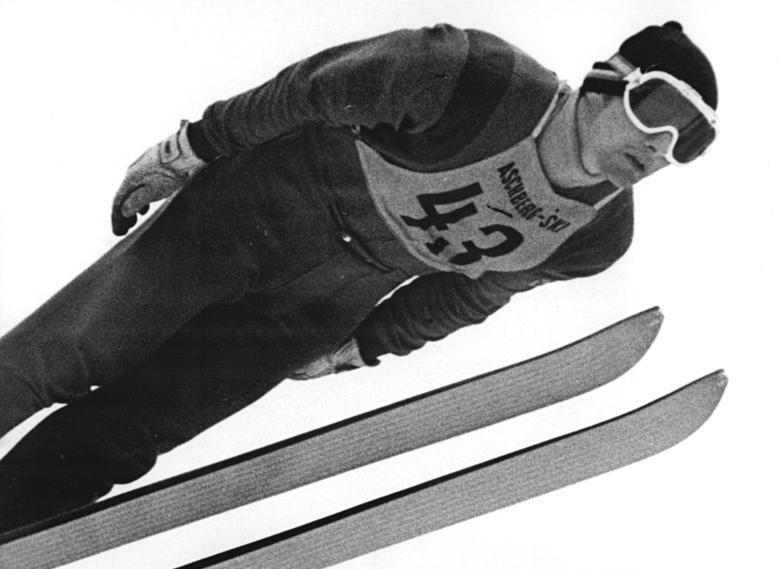
- Schmidt in 1971
Medal record
Men's ski jumping
Representing East Germany
Olympic Games
Bronze medal – third place	1972 Sapporo	Individual large hill
World Championships
Bronze medal – third place	1972 Sapporo	Individual large hill
Men's ski flying
World Championships
Silver medal – second place	1975 Bad Mitterndorf	Individual

Rainer Schmidt (born 1 August 1948 in Langewiesen, Thuringia) is an East German former ski jumper who competed from 1972 to 1976. He won the bronze medal in the individual large hill competition at the 1972 Winter Olympics in Sapporo.

Schmidt won the Four Hills Tournament in 1973 and earned a silver medal at the FIS Ski-Flying World Championships in 1975.
