= Günther Göllner =

German ski jumper

Personal information
- Nationality: German
- Born: 21 June 1941 (age 85) Poddębice, Poland

Sport
- Sport: Ski jumping

Günther Göllner (born 21 June 1941) is a German ski jumper. He competed at the 1968 Winter Olympics and the 1972 Winter Olympics.
