= Josef Zehnder =

Swiss ski jumper

Personal information
- Nationality: Swiss
- Born: 25 March 1944 (age 82) Einsiedeln, Switzerland

Sport
- Sport: Ski jumping

Josef Zehnder (born 25 March 1944) is a Swiss ski jumper. He competed at the 1964 Winter Olympics, the 1968 Winter Olympics and the 1972 Winter Olympics.
