= Bent Tomtum =

Norwegian ski jumper

Bent Tomtum (6 February 1949 - 15 October 2001) was a Norwegian ski jumper who competed from 1968 to 1973. He finished fifth in the individual large hill event at the 1968 Winter Olympics in Grenoble.

Tomtum's best career finish was second in an individual normal hill event in West Germany in 1970.
