= Ladislav Divila =

Czech ski jumper

Personal information
- Born: 14 May 1944 (age 81) Přerov, Protectorate of Bohemia and Moravia

Sport
- Country: Czechoslovakia
- Sport: Skiing

Ladislav Divila (born 14 May 1944) is a Czech former ski jumper. He competed in the normal hill event at the 1968 Winter Olympics, representing Czechoslovakia. On 8 March 1969, he crashed at ski flying world record distance at 156 metres (512 ft) on Vikersundbakken hill in Vikersund, Norway.

== Invalid ski jumping world record ==
| Date | Hill | Location | Metres | Feet |
|---|---|---|---|---|
| 8 March 1969 | Vikersundbakken | Vikersund, Norway | 156 | 512 |

Not recognized! Crash at world record distance.
