= Yukio Kasaya =

Japanese ski jumper (1943–2024)

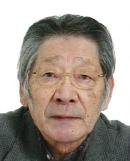
- Kasaya in 2018

Personal information
- Born: August 17, 1943 Ōe Village, Japan
- Died: April 23, 2024 (aged 80) Sapporo, Japan
- Height: 170 cm (5 ft 7 in)
- Weight: 66 kg (146 lb)

Sport
- Sport: Ski jumping
- Club: Meiji University; Nikka Whisky Distilling
- Retired: 1976
Medal record
Men's ski jumping
Representing Japan
Olympic Games
Gold medal – first place	1972 Sapporo	Individual normal hill
World Championships
Gold medal – first place	1972 Sapporo	Individual normal hill
Silver medal – second place	1970 Vysoké Tatry	Individual normal hill

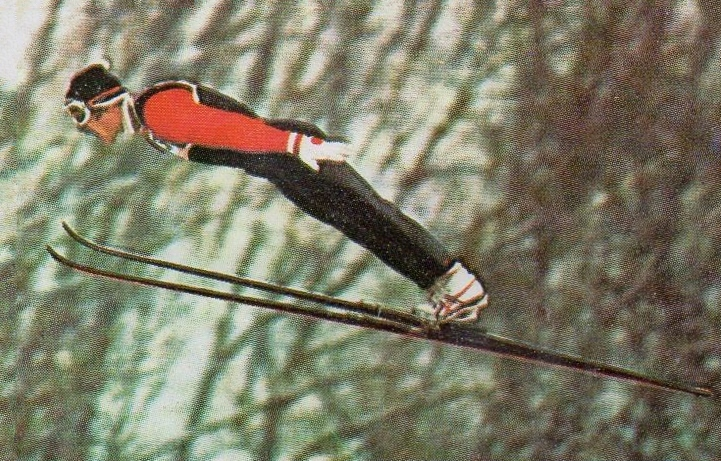
Kasaya in 1972

Yukio Kasaya (笠谷 幸生, Kasaya Yukio; August 17, 1943 – April 23, 2024) was a Japanese ski jumper. At the 1972 Olympics in Sapporo he became the first Japanese athlete to win a gold medal and the second Japanese (after Chiharu Igaya) to win any medal at the Winter Olympics. Previously he placed second at the 1970 World Championships and won the first three jumping events at the 1971/72 Four Hills Tournament. He also took part in the 1964, 1968, and 1976 Olympics and served as the Olympic flag bearer for Japan in 1976 and 1998.

Kasaya took up ski jumping at the Taketsuru facility in his native Yoichi, which was built by the founder of Nikka Whisky Distilling Masataka Taketsuru. The facility was renamed after Kasaya in 1972. Kasaya was a long-term employee of the Nikka distillery, eventually becoming its section head.

Kasaya died of heart failure in Sapporo on April 23, 2024, at the age of 80.
