= Alain Macle =

French ski jumper (1944–2020)

Personal information
- Nationality: French
- Born: 18 April 1944; Les Rousses, France
- Died: 21 March 2020 (aged 75)

Sport
- Sport: Ski jumping

Alain Macle (18 April 1944 – 21 March 2020) was a French ski jumper. He competed at the 1968 Winter Olympics and the 1972 Winter Olympics.
