= Anatoliy Zheglanov =

Soviet ski jumper

Anatoliy Zheglanov (14 May 1946, Zaporizhia, USSR – 28 June 1999) was a Soviet ski jumper who competed from 1968 to 1972. At the 1968 Winter Olympics in Grenoble, he finished sixth in the individual normal hill and eight in the individual large hill events.

Zheglanov's best career finish was second three times from 1968 to 1970.
