= László Gellér =

Hungarian ski jumper

Personal information
- Nationality: Hungarian
- Born: 5 August 1944 (age 82) Tótkomlós, Hungary

Sport
- Sport: Ski jumping

László Gellér (born 5 August 1944) is a Hungarian ski jumper. He competed at the 1964 Winter Olympics and the 1968 Winter Olympics.
