= Hans Schmid (ski jumper) =

Swiss ski jumper

Personal information
- Nationality: Swiss
- Born: 24 June 1948 (age 78)

Sport
- Sport: Ski jumping

Hans Schmid (born 24 June 1948) is a Swiss ski jumper. He competed at the 1972 Winter Olympics and the 1976 Winter Olympics.
