= Gilbert Poirot =

French ski jumper

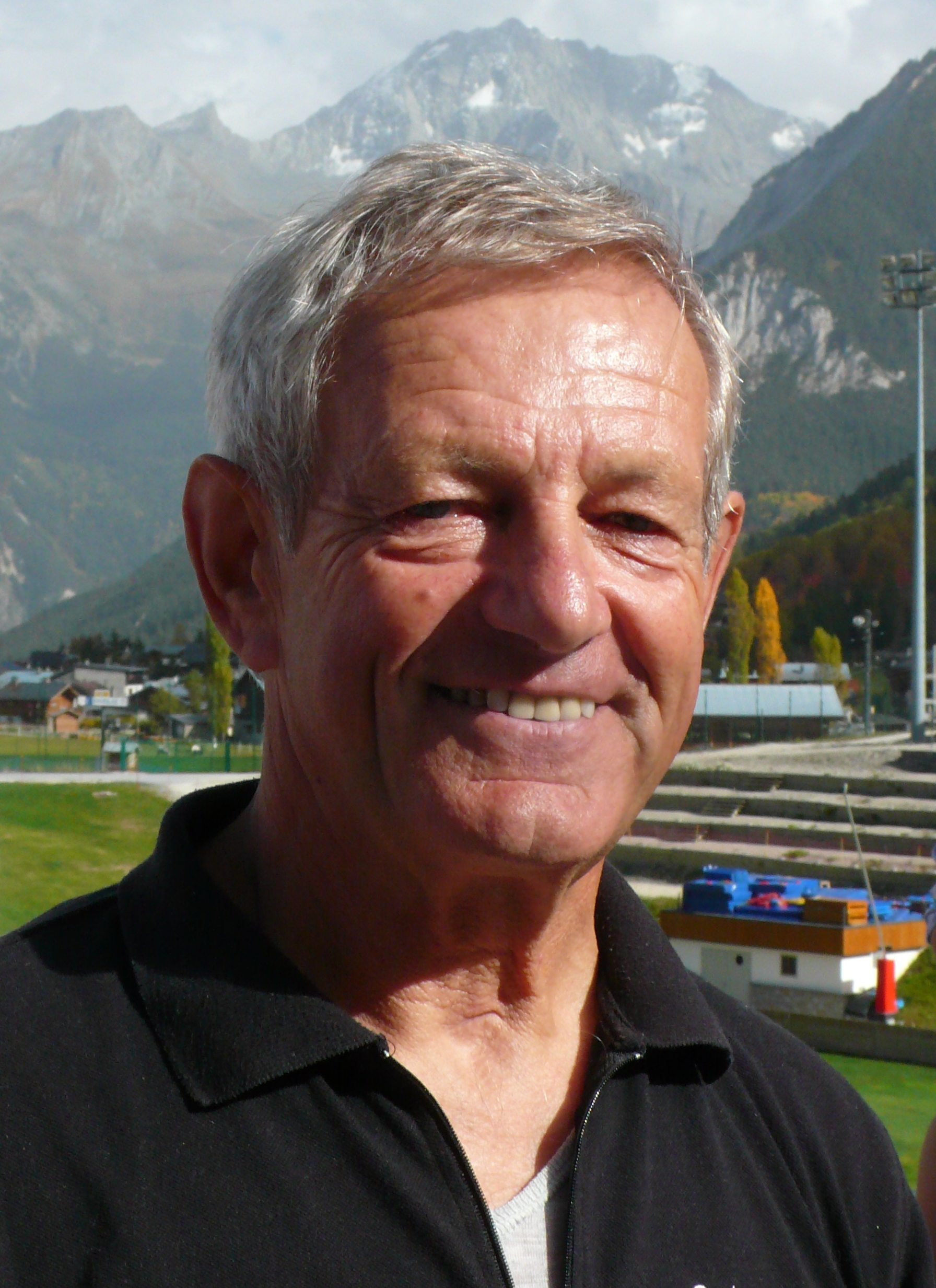

Personal information
- Born: 21 September 1944 La Bresse, Vosges, France
- Died: 1 February 2012 (aged 67) Chamonix, France

Sport
- Sport: Skiing

Gilbert Poirot (French: [ʒilbɛʁ pwaʁo]; 21 September 1944 – 1 February 2012) was a French ski jumper. He competed at the 1968 and 1972 Winter Olympics.
