= Marjan Mesec =

Slovenian ski jumper

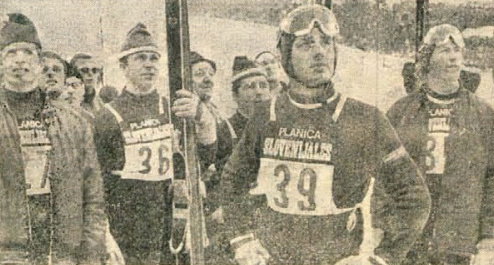
- Marjan Mesec in 1969

Personal information
- Nationality: Slovenian
- Born: 14 August 1947 (age 79) Kranj, Yugoslavia

Sport
- Sport: Ski jumping

Marjan Mesec (born 14 August 1947) is a Slovenian ski jumper. He competed at the 1968 Winter Olympics and the 1972 Winter Olympics. He placed 38th in the 1968 Olympics in the normal hill ski jump, and then 37th for the same event in 1972. In 1972, he also placed 37th in the large hill ski jump.
