= Gariy Napalkov =

Soviet ski jumper

Medal record

Men's ski jumping

Representing Soviet Union

World Championships
Gold medal – first place	1970 Vysoké Tatry	Individual normal hill
Gold medal – first place	1970 Vysoké Tatry	Individual large hill

Gariy Yuriyevich Napalkov (Russian: Гарий Юрьевич Напалков; born 27 June 1948 in Gorky, now Nizhny Novgorod) is a Soviet former ski jumper who competed from 1968 to 1976. He won both ski jumping events at the 1970 FIS Nordic World Ski Championships in Vysoké Tatry.

Napalkov also competed at the 1972 Winter Olympics in Sapporo, finished 6th in the individual large hill and tied for 7th in the individual normal hill. He also had two other career victories in the normal hill (1968, 1969).
