= Ryszard Witke =

Polish ski jumper (1939–2020)

Personal information
- Nationality: Polish
- Born: 9 November 1939 Sanok, Poland
- Died: 27 October 2020 (aged 80) Karpacz, Poland

Sport
- Sport: Ski jumping

Ryszard Witke (9 November 1939 – 27 October 2020) was a Polish ski jumper. He competed at the 1964 Winter Olympics and the 1968 Winter Olympics.

Witke died on 27 October 2020 at Karpacz, Poland, at the age of 80.
