= Rudolf Höhnl =

Czech ski jumper (born 1946)

Medal record

Men's ski jumping

Representing Czechoslovakia

World Championships
Bronze medal – third place	1974 Falun	Individual large hill

Rudolf Höhnl (born 21 April 1946 in Pernink) is a Czech former ski jumper who competed for Czechoslovakia. He won the bronze medal in the individual large hill at the 1974 FIS Nordic World Ski Championships in Falun. Höhnl also competed at the 1968, 1972, and 1976 Winter Olympics.
