= Max Golser =

Austrian ski jumper (1940–2019)

Personal information
- Nationality: Austrian
- Born: 4 May 1940 Vomp, Nazi Germany
- Died: 23 April 2019 (aged 78)

Sport
- Sport: Ski jumping

Max Golser (4 May 1940 – 23 April 2019) was an Austrian ski jumper. He competed at the 1968 Winter Olympics and the 1972 Winter Olympics.
