= Peter Štefančič =

Slovenian ski jumper

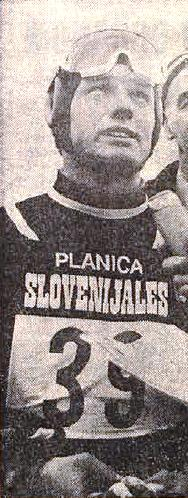
- Peter Štefančič in 1969

Personal information
- Nationality: Slovenian
- Born: 3 March 1947 (age 79) Kranj, Yugoslavia

Sport
- Sport: Ski jumping

Peter Štefančič (born 3 March 1947) is a Slovenian ski jumper. He competed at the 1968 Winter Olympics and the 1972 Winter Olympics.
