= Zbyněk Hubač =

Czech ski jumper (born 1940)

Zbyněk Hubač (born 1 September 1940) is a Czech former ski jumper who competed for Czechoslovakia from 1962 to 1973.

== Life ==
Hubač was born on 1 September 1940 in Turnov. After he ended his active career, he was a coach in the Dukla Turnov ski club. He still lives in Turnov.

== Career ==
His lone victory was at Innsbruck during the 1970–71 Four Hills Tournament. Hubač also competed in three Winter Olympics, earning his best finish of 19th twice (Individual large hill: 1968, Individual large hill: 1964).
