= Reinhold Bachler =

Austrian ski jumper

- Bachler in 1967

Personal information
- Nationality: Austria
- Born: 26 December 1944 Eisenerz, Nazi Germany
- Height: 174 cm (5 ft 9 in)

Sport
- Sport: Skiing
- Club: WSV Eisenerz

Achievements and titles
- Personal bests: 172 m (564 ft); Planica, Yugoslavia (20 March 1977)
Medal record
Men's ski jumping
Olympic Games
Silver medal – second place	1968 Grenoble	Individual NH
World Championships
Silver medal – second place	1968 Grenoble	Individual NH

Reinhold Bachler (born 26 December 1944) is an Austrian former ski jumper. He was born in Eisenerz, and competed from 1968 to 1978.

== Career ==
His best-known finish was a silver medal in the Individual Normal Hill at the 1968 Winter Olympics in Grenoble. He later worked as a coach from 1982 to 2000.

On 12 March 1967, he set the ski jumping world record distance at 154 metres (505 ft) on Vikersundbakken hill in Vikersund, Norway.

On 20 March 1977, as trial jumper set his personal best and hill record at the same time, which lasted for two years at 172 metres (564 ft) on Velikanka bratov Gorišek K165 in Planica, Yugoslavia.

== Ski jumping world record ==
Date	Hill	Location	Metres	Feet
12 March 1967	Vikersundbakken	Vikersund, Norway	154	505
