= Ski jumping at the FIS Nordic World Ski Championships 1970 =

Ski jumping events at the 1970 FIS Nordic World Ski Championships in Vysoké Tatry

Ski jumping at the FIS Nordic World Ski Championships 1970 comprised ski jumping events held from 14 to 22 February 1970 at the ski jumping hills in Štrbské Pleso, as part of the FIS Nordic World Ski Championships 1970 in Vysoké Tatry, Czechoslovakia.

For the third time in championship history, two individual ski jumping competitions were held – one on the normal hill and one on the large hill. Additionally, an unofficial team competition was staged on the final day as an exhibition event.

Gariy Napalkov of the Soviet Union became a double world champion, securing gold medals in both individual events. This marked the second instance in history where a single athlete won both ski jumping competitions at the same world championships. Silver medals were awarded to Yukio Kasaya on the normal hill and Jiří Raška on the large hill, while bronze medals went to Lars Grini on the normal hill and Stanisław Gąsienica Daniel on the large hill.

The 1970 ski jumping events were the 18th edition of the FIS Nordic World Ski Championships, and the third time (following 1925 and 1935) the championships were hosted in Czechoslovakia.

== Pre-championships ==
=== Organization ===
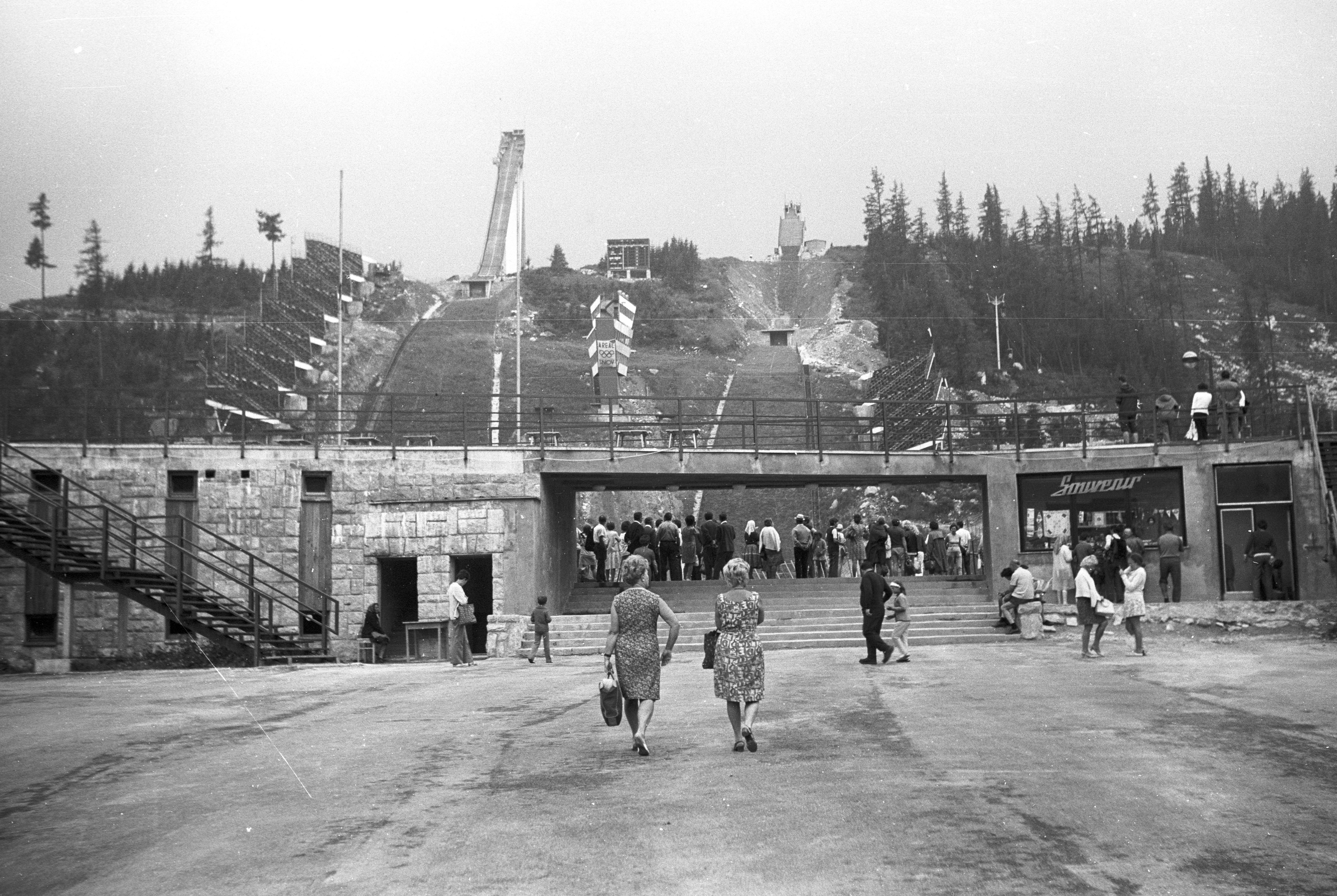
Ski jumping complex MS 1970 in Štrbské Pleso (photo from 1971)

Czechoslovakia hosted the FIS Nordic World Ski Championships for the third time, with the event returning to Vysoké Tatry for the second time since 1935. The ski jumping hill used in 1935, Jarolímek, was demolished in 1962. A new ski jumping complex, named MS 1970, was constructed in Štrbské Pleso between 1968 and 1969 specifically for the championships. Cross-country trails were modernized, and surrounding infrastructure was rebuilt. The rack railway was upgraded and electrified, replacing the previous steam railway. These improvements made Vysoké Tatry the most modern skiing center in Central Europe at the time.

The organizing committee was chaired by Jozef Lukáč, with Ladislav Harvan as vice-chairman. The technical delegate for ski jumping events from the International Ski Federation was Anatoliy Akientyev. Notable attendees included Czechoslovak President Ludvík Svoboda, Prime Minister Lubomír Štrougal, Communist Party leader Gustáv Husák, and International Ski Federation President Marc Hodler.

=== Favorites ===
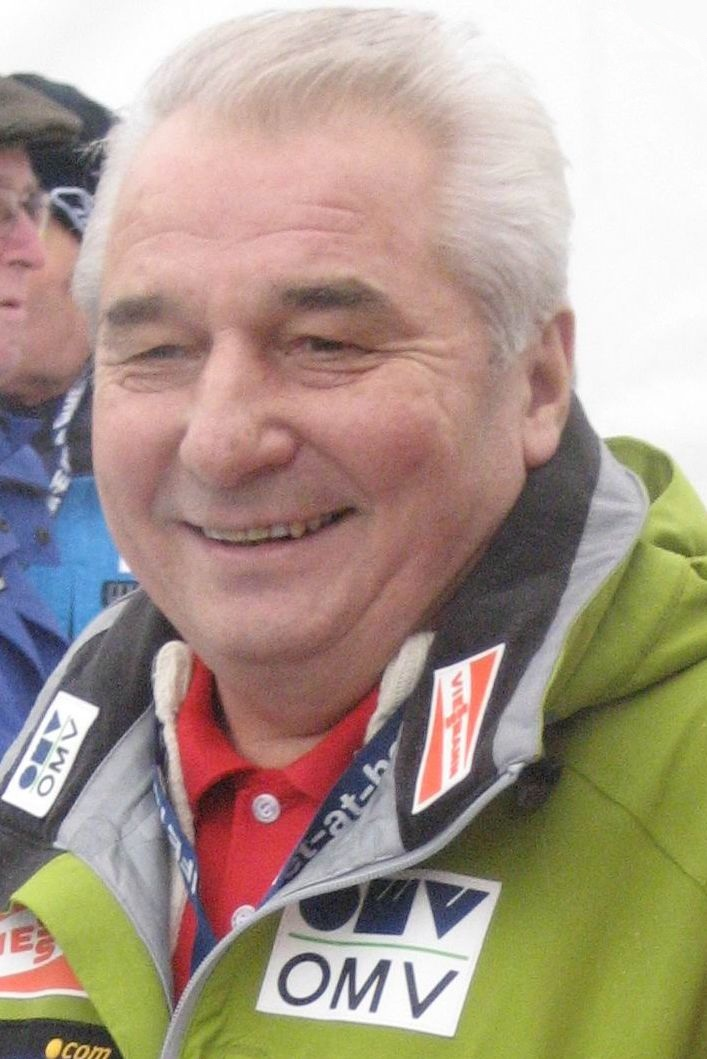
Jiří Raška, Olympic champion and silver medalist from Grenoble (photo from 2008)

At the previous 1966 championships in Oslo, Bjørn Wirkola won both the normal and large hill events, the first time a single skier achieved this feat at one championship. In the 1968 Winter Olympics in Grenoble, Jiří Raška won the normal hill, and Vladimir Belousov won the large hill.

The 18th Four Hills Tournament (1969/1970) saw victories by Gariy Napalkov in Oberstdorf, Jiří Raška in Garmisch-Partenkirchen and Bischofshofen, and Bjørn Wirkola in Innsbruck. Despite no individual wins, Horst Queck won the overall tournament, edging out Wirkola by 2.8 points.

Queck also dominated the sixth Friendship Cup in ski jumping, winning all three events in Oberhof, Klingenthal, and Brotterode.

On 1 February 1970, the European Junior Ski Championships 1970 in Gosau saw Bernd Eckstein win gold, Odd Grette silver, and Bernd Hoddow bronze. Gyula Molnár, who placed sixth, also competed in Vysoké Tatry.

Leading up to the championships, favorites included Soviet skiers Vladimir Belousov and Gariy Napalkov, East German Horst Queck, Norwegian Bjørn Wirkola, and Czechoslovak Jiří Raška.

== Rules ==
Competitors performed three jumps: one practice and two competitive jumps. Five FIS-appointed judges evaluated each competitive jump, awarding up to 20 points for style (flight and landing). The total score included points for distance, calculated relative to the construction point, and style, based on the three median judges' scores (excluding the highest and lowest).

== Ski jumping hills ==
The ski jumping hills in Štrbské Pleso, built specifically for the championships, were named MS 1970. The large hill had a construction point at 90 meters, and the normal hill at 70 meters.

Image	Hill name	Location	Construction point	Hill record		
	MS 1970 A	Štrbské Pleso	K-90	95.0 m	(Czechoslovakia) Josef Kraus	1969
	MS 1970 B	Štrbské Pleso	K-70	No data		

== Competition ==
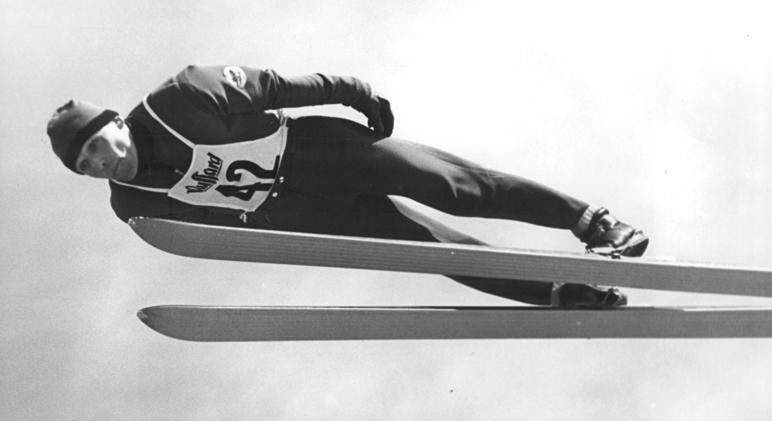
Horst Queck, a medal favorite, finished 30th on the normal hill after a fall in the first round

The championships opened with a ceremony where Jiří Raška took the athletes' oath on behalf of competitors. The normal hill competition, the first event of the championships, began with a practice round at 1:00 PM on 14 February 1970, an hour after the opening ceremony.

67 athletes were registered, with 66 competing. In the first competitive round, 12 skiers reached or exceeded 80 meters, with Lars Grini (81.0 m) the first to do so and Yukio Kasaya achieving the longest jump at 84.5 m. Kasaya led after the first round, followed by Vladimir Belousov, who jumped 81.5 m but earned higher style scores, and Karl-Erik Johansson (84.0 m). Medal favorite Horst Queck fell during his 80.5 m jump, receiving low style scores (7 and 10 points), which dropped him to 30th place.

In the second round, six skiers reached or surpassed 80 meters. Gariy Napalkov, 10th after the first round, jumped 84.0 m to win gold. Other notable jumps included Josef Matouš (82.5 m), Lars Grini (81.5 m), Jo Inge Bjørnebye (81.0 m), Horst Queck (81.0 m), and Josef Zehnder (80.0 m). Kasaya's 79.0 m jump secured silver, overtaking Belousov, while Grini's performance earned bronze.

The large hill competition on 21 February 1970 involved 68 competitors. 19 skiers reached or exceeded the 90-meter construction point in the first round, with Jürgen Dommerich (91.0 m) the first to do so. Ernst Kröll and Karl-Erik Johansson jumped 95.0 m, but Tadeusz Pawlusiak (94.5 m) and Karel Kodejška (93.0 m) led due to higher style scores. Napalkov was 13th after a 91.0 m jump.

Before the second round, the jury raised the starting gate, resulting in longer jumps: 51 skiers reached at least 90 meters, and 13 hit 100 meters or more. Napalkov and Ingolf Mork both jumped 109.5 m, setting a new hill record for MS 1970 A, though Mork fell. Napalkov's jump secured gold. Heinz Schmidt (104.0 m) and Hans Schmid (102.0 m) followed in distance. Jiří Raška (99.0 m) won silver, and Stanisław Gąsienica Daniel (100.5 m) took bronze. Pawlusiak, leading after the first round, fell after a 100.5 m jump, dropping to 34th.

Approximately 140,000 spectators attended the ski jumping events.

Excluding Olympic results counted as "dual championships", Napalkov became the first Soviet skier to win a world championship in ski jumping and the second, after Bjørn Wirkola, to win both events at one championship. Raška's silver was Czechoslovakia's first world championship medal since 1933 (Rudolf Burkert's silver in Innsbruck), and Gąsienica Daniel's bronze was Poland's first since 1962 (Antoni Łaciak's silver in Zakopane).

=== Exhibition event – team competition ===
On the final day of the World Championships, 22 February 1970, a team competition was held with the participation of 18 teams. However, the team event was not included in the official championship schedule and was only held as a demonstration competition. The winners were the representatives of Czechoslovakia, followed by East Germany in second place, the Soviet Union in third, Japan in fourth, Poland in fifth, and Norway in sixth.

== Results ==
=== Individual competition on K-70 hill (14 February 1970) ===
Rank	Start number	Athlete	Country	Round 1		Round 2		Total score
Rank	Start number	Athlete	Country	Jump	Points	Jump	Points	Total score
1.	39	Gariy Napalkov	Soviet Union	78.5	115.4	84.0	125.2	240.6
2.	51	Yukio Kasaya	Japan	84.5	122.0	79.0	115.7	237.7
3.	5	Lars Grini	Norway	81.0	118.4	81.5	116.2	234.6
4.	35	Rudolf Höhnl	Czechoslovakia	81.5	118.7	79.0	114.7	233.4
5.	55	Karl-Erik Johansson	Sweden	84.0	120.2	79.0	112.2	232.4
6.	65	Vladimir Belousov	Soviet Union	81.5	122.2	75.5	109.6	231.8
7.	28	Seiji Aochi	Japan	81.0	117.9	79.0	113.7	231.6
8.	64	Jiří Raška	Czechoslovakia	78.5	115.9	78.5	114.9	230.8
9.	41	Ingolf Mork	Norway	82.0	119.5	76.5	110.7	230.2
10.	46	Josef Zehnder	Switzerland	79.5	114.5	80.0	115.3	229.8
11.	22	Jo Inge Bjørnebye	Norway	78.0	113.1	81.0	116.4	229.5
12.	45	Tadeusz Pawlusiak	Poland	82.5	118.8	77.5	108.3	227.1
13.	59	Bjørn Wirkola	Norway	77.0	111.0	78.5	114.4	225.4
14.	43	Tauno Käyhkö	Finland	77.0	109.5	79.0	113.2	222.7
15.	34	Takashi Fujisawa	Japan	76.0	111.4	76.0	110.4	221.8
16.	56	Hans Schmid	Switzerland	80.0	111.3	77.0	107.0	218.3
17.	32	Ernst Kröll	Austria	80.5	113.6	75.0	102.8	216.4
18.	25	Jürgen Dommerich	East Germany	78.5	111.9	75.0	104.3	216.2
19.	67	Ludvik Zajc	Yugoslavia	79.0	110.2	75.0	105.3	215.5
20.	8	Karel Kodejška	Czechoslovakia	75.5	108.6	75.0	106.3	214.9
20.	44	Rainer Schmidt	East Germany	77.0	108.0	76.0	106.9	214.9
22.	4	Koba Zakadze	Soviet Union	75.5	105.6	76.0	108.4	214.0
23.	19	Eilert Mähler	Sweden	74.5	104.0	77.5	109.8	213.8
24.	60	Greg Swor	United States	77.5	107.3	76.0	106.4	213.7
25.	38	Adrian Watt	United States	77.0	106.0	78.0	107.6	213.6
26.	57	Gilbert Poirot	France	76.5	107.7	76.0	104.9	212.6
27.	50	Heinz Ihle	West Germany	80.5	111.6	76.0	100.9	212.5
28.	7	Walter Steiner	Switzerland	78.0	108.6	75.0	103.8	212.4
29.	36	Sepp Lichtenegger	Austria	75.5	105.6	77.0	106.0	211.6
30.	54	Horst Queck	East Germany	80.5	92.6	81.0	118.4	211.0
31.	9	Bernd Willomitzer	East Germany	74.5	102.0	78.0	108.6	210.6
32.	21	Raimo Ekholm	Finland	74.0	105.2	75.0	105.3	210.5
33.	66	Stanisław Gąsienica Daniel	Poland	76.0	102.4	77.0	107.5	209.9
34.	30	Aleksandr Ivannikov	Soviet Union	77.5	112.3	71.0	97.4	209.7
35.	27	Bill Bakke	United States	77.0	108.0	74.0	101.2	209.2
36.	17	Peter Štefančič	Yugoslavia	75.5	103.6	77.0	105.5	209.1
37.	15	Reinhold Bachler	Austria	77.5	107.8	74.0	101.2	209.0
38.	58	Topi Mattila	Finland	74.5	105.0	73.0	102.1	207.1
39.	23	Józef Przybyła	Poland	74.0	103.7	73.0	100.6	204.3
40.	6	Hisayothi Sawada	Japan	73.0	103.1	72.0	100.0	203.1
41.	11	Adam Krzysztofiak	Poland	73.5	100.4	75.5	102.6	203.0
42.	18	Günther Göllner	West Germany	75.0	101.8	75.0	100.8	202.6
43.	61	Mihály Gellér	Hungary	75.0	103.8	73.0	98.1	201.9
44.	14	Jerry Martin	United States	72.0	99.5	73.0	101.1	200.6
45.	31	Max Golser	Austria	75.0	104.3	72.0	96.0	200.3
46.	13	Tommy Karlsson	Sweden	73.0	98.6	73.5	100.4	199.0
47.	48	Lars Ström	Sweden	76.0	103.4	72.0	95.0	198.4
48.	24	Josef Matouš	Czechoslovakia	77.5	106.8	82.5	89.8	196.6
49.	16	Richard Pfiffner	Switzerland	72.5	96.8	75.5	97.9	194.1
50.	49	Sepp Schwinghammer	West Germany	72.0	93.5	75.5	100.6	194.1
51.	20	Mario Cecon	Italy	72.0	97.0	72.0	97.0	194.0
52.	62	Giacomo Aimoni	Italy	74.5	101.0	70.0	92.8	193.8
52.	32	Albino Bazzana	Italy	73.0	95.1	74.0	98.7	193.8
54.	12	Alfred Grosche	West Germany	77.0	103.5	71.0	88.9	192.4
55.	26	Maurice Arbez	France	73.0	96.1	72.0	94.5	190.6
56.	42	Janez Jurman	Yugoslavia	73.0	96.1	69.5	91.0	187.1
57.	2	Esko Rautionaho	Finland	71.0	92.4	68.5	89.4	181.8
58.	53	Patrick Morris	Canada	73.5	96.4	70.0	84.8	181.2
59.	29	John McInnes	Canada	70.0	90.8	68.5	87.4	178.2
60.	10	Branko Dolhar	Yugoslavia	68.0	84.6	72.0	93.5	178.1
61.	33	Gyula Molnár	Hungary	71.0	89.9	70.0	87.8	177.7
62.	37	Ulf Kvendbo	Canada	69.5	88.5	67.5	84.3	172.8
63.	40	Anghel Biris	Romania	63.5	75.9	61.0	72.4	148.3
64.	63	Dumitru Lupu	Romania	63.5	75.4	60.5	70.6	146.0
65.	3	Zdenek Mezl	Canada	65.5	77.6	63.0	67.6	145.2
66.	1	James Yerly	France	60.0	68.8	60.5	70.1	138.9
–	47	Alain Macle	France	DNS				DNS

=== Individual competition on K-90 hill (21 February 1970) ===
Rank	Start number	Athlete	Country	Round 1		Round 2		Total score
Rank	Start number	Athlete	Country	Jump	Points	Jump	Points	Total score
1.	52	Gariy Napalkov	Soviet Union	91.0	98.3	109.5	127.7	226.0
2.	53	Jiří Raška	Czechoslovakia	91.0	99.8	99.0	112.5	212.3
3.	37	Stanisław Gąsienica Daniel	Poland	92.0	99.7	100.5	112.1	211.8
4.	68	Tauno Käyhkö	Finland	93.5	100.3	101.0	109.3	209.6
4.	39	Ernst Kröll	Austria	95.0	100.9	99.5	108.7	209.6
6.	60	Takashi Fujisawa	Japan	89.5	99.7	99.0	108.0	207.7
7.	28	Jo Inge Bjørnebye	Norway	94.0	100.5	100.0	106.9	207.4
8.	24	Karel Kodejška	Czechoslovakia	93.0	101.6	95.0	103.9	205.5
9.	56	Reinhold Bachler	Austria	93.5	98.8	98.0	106.6	205.4
10.	61	Hans Schmid	Switzerland	93.0	94.6	102.0	110.7	205.3
11.;	41	Lars Grini	Norway	85.0	90.4	100.0	113.9	204.3
12.	32	Anatoly Zheglanov	Soviet Union	89.0	95.5	97.0	108.7	204.2
13.	14	Josef Matouš	Czechoslovakia	94.0	96.5	100.0	107.4	203.9
14.	30	Josef Zehnder	Switzerland	90.5	95.6	99.0	107.5	203.1
15.	8	Raimo Ekholm	Finland	89.5	92.2	98.5	109.3	201.5
15.	67	Ludvik Zajc	Yugoslavia	90.0	94.9	98.0	106.6	201.5
17.	59	Horst Queck	East Germany	91.0	99.8	97.0	101.2	201.0
18.	42	Vladimir Belousov	Soviet Union	90.0	98.4	93.0	102.1	200.5
19.	2	Jürgen Dommerich	East Germany	91.0	88.8	100.0	111.4	200.2
20.	48	Rudolf Höhnl	Czechoslovakia	85.5	89.1	99.0	111.0	200.1
20.	66	Karl-Erik Johansson	Sweden	95.0	101.4	97.0	98.7	200.1
22.	11	Koba Zakadze	Soviet Union	90.0	94.4	98.0	105.1	199.5
23.	36	Walter Steiner	Switzerland	88.0	90.6	99.5	108.7	199.3
24.	51	Heinz Schmidt	East Germany	82.5	83.4	104.0	115.5	198.9
25.	65	Ingolf Mork	Norway	89.0	95.5	109.5	99.2	194.7
26.	58	Topi Mattila	Finland	88.0	89.1	98.0	104.6	193.7
27.	3	Greg Swor	United States	85.0	88.4	94.0	103.5	191.9
28.	29	Bjørn Wirkola	Norway	84.0	84.5	98.5	107.3	191.8
29.	34	Rainer Schmidt	East Germany	86.5	90.5	93.0	99.6	190.1
29.	64	Heinz Ihle	West Germany	85.5	85.1	99.0	105.0	190.1
31.	23	Tommy Karlsson	Sweden	88.0	84.6	97.0	105.2	189.8
32.	35	Yukio Kasaya	Japan	79.0	75.0	100.0	113.4	188.4
33.	50	Esko Rautionaho	Finland	86.0	83.3	99.5	103.7	187.0
34.	55	Tadeusz Pawlusiak	Poland	94.5	102.7	100.5	83.1	185.8
35.	26	Mihály Gellér	Hungary	90.0	86.9	95.0	97.4	184.3
36.	16	Max Golser	Austria	87.0	87.2	93.5	96.8	184.0
37.	57	Gilbert Poirot	France	85.0	84.4	91.0	95.8	180.2
38.	38	Albino Bazzana	Italy	86.0	83.8	92.0	94.7	178.5
39.	17	Józef Przybyła	Poland	86.0	82.8	90.0	94.9	177.7
40.	25	Sepp Lichtenegger	Austria	84.0	81.5	91.0	95.8	177.3
41.	63	Giacomo Aimoni	Italy	79.0	76.0	95.0	100.9	176.9
42.	12	Hisayothi Sawada	Japan	83.0	82.6	91.5	93.5	176.1
43.	43	Peter Štefančič	Yugoslavia	80.0	67.4	100.0	108.4	175.8
44.	31	Seiji Aochi	Japan	80.0	79.9	92.0	93.7	173.6
45.	46	Eilert Mähler	Sweden	78.0	71.1	93.0	98.6	169.7
46.	1	Richard Pfiffner	Switzerland	81.0	70.8	93.5	97.3	168.1
47.	5	Drago Pudgar	Yugoslavia	87.5	82.9	89.0	85.0	167.9
48.	6	Jerry Martin	United States	82.5	79.9	87.0	87.2	167.1
49.	4	Lars Ström	Sweden	82.0	68.2	94.0	97.0	165.2
50.	27	Günther Göllner	West Germany	86.0	84.8	82.0	75.7	160.5
51.	40	László Gellér	Hungary	81.0	69.3	92.0	90.2	159.5
52.	54	Gyula Molnár	Hungary	77.0	63.2	93.5	95.3	158.5
53.	19	Adrian Watt	United States	78.0	68.1	88.5	89.3	157.4
54.	45	Bill Bakke	United States	73.5	59.3	91.5	96.0	155.3
55.	62	Ulf Kvendbo	Canada	76.5	67.5	87.0	84.2	151.7
56.	47	Alfred Grosche	West Germany	72.0	55.2	93.5	94.3	149.5
57.	15	Józef Kocyan	Poland	79.0	70.5	85.0	75.9	146.4
58.	18	Mario Cecon	Italy	77.5	67.4	85.0	78.4	145.8
59.	21	Marjan Mesec	Yugoslavia	82.0	73.2	81.5	71.0	144.2
60.	33	John McInnes	Canada	77.0	65.7	76.0	65.8	131.5
61.	9	Anghel Biris	Romania	72.5	58.4	85.0	72.4	130.8
62.	7	Yvan Richard	France	73.0	55.6	80.0	66.9	122.5
63.	49	Patrick Morris	Canada	76.0	63.8	74.0	58.0	121.8
64.	13	Sepp Schwinghammer	West Germany	68.5	44.3	81.0	71.3	115.6
65.	20	Jacques Gaillard	France	72.0	55.7	73.5	57.8	113.5
66.	44	Maurice Arbez	France	71.5	55.5	71.5	52.5	108.0
67.	22	Dumitru Lupu	Romania	73.0	55.6	71.5	49.5	105.1
68.	10	Zdenek Mezl	Canada	69.0	42.0	80.0	62.4	104.4

== Team compositions ==
18 of the 25 participating nations in the FIS Nordic World Ski Championships 1970 fielded ski jumping teams in Štrbské Pleso.

Athlete	Date of birth	1966 World Championships		1968 Winter Olympics		1970 World Championships		Source
Athlete	Date of birth	Normal hill	Large hill	Normal hill	Large hill	Normal hill	Large hill	Source
Austria
Reinhold Bachler	26 December 1944	12	19	2	6	37	9	
Ernst Kröll	8 November 1948	–	–	–	–	17	4	
Sepp Lichtenegger	13 November 1937	37	24	29	28	29	40	
Max Golser	4 May 1940	19	21	36	22	45	36	
Canada
Ulf Kvendbo	11 April 1948	61	56	53	55	62	55	
John McInnes	7 July 1939	56	47	55	57	59	60	
Patrick Morris	Unknown	–	–	–	–	58	63	
Zdenek Mezl	13 July 1948	–	–	–	–	65	68	
Czechoslovakia
Rudolf Höhnl	21 April 1946	–	40	–	12	4	20	
Karel Kodejška	20 March 1947	–	–	–	–	20	8	
Josef Matouš	6 January 1942	12	41	–	–	48	13	
Jiří Raška	4 February 1941	4	4	1	2	8	2	
East Germany
Jürgen Dommerich	6 November 1948	–	–	–	–	18	19	
Horst Queck	5 October 1943	7	44	–	–	30	17	
Rainer Schmidt	1 August 1948	–	–	–	–	20	28	
Heinz Schmidt	Unknown	–	–	–	–	–	24	
Bernd Willomitzer	1949	–	–	–	–	31	–	
Finland
Raimo Ekholm	31 July 1946	–	–	–	–	32	15	
Tauno Käyhkö	6 May 1950	–	–	–	–	14	4	
Topi Mattila	29 March 1946	25	31	5	49	38	29	
Esko Rautionaho	23 September 1950	–	–	–	–	57	33	
France
Maurice Arbez	22 September 1944	55	59	41	50	55	66	
Jacques Gaillard	16 August 1950	–	–	–	–	–	65	
Alain Macle	18 April 1944	47	57	18	17	DNS	–	
Gilbert Poirot	21 September 1944	50	32	10	10	26	37	
Yvan Richard	11 December 1950	–	–	–	–	–	62	
James Yerly	19 November 1949	–	–	–	–	66	–	
Hungary
Mihály Gellér	5 August 1947	–	–	58	56	43	35	
László Gellér	5 August 1944	48	50	34	19	–	51	
Gyula Molnár	1952	–	–	–	–	61	52	
Italy
Giacomo Aimoni	23 December 1939	30	39	25	16	52	41	
Albino Bazzana	26 April 1942	–	–	–	–	52	38	
Mario Cecon	Unknown	49	48	–	–	51	58	
Japan
Seiji Aochi	21 June 1942	–	–	–	26	7	44	
Takashi Fujisawa	7 February 1943	16	2	26	18	15	6	
Yukio Kasaya	17 August 1943	17	28	23	20	2	32	
Hisayothi Sawada	2 December 1947	51	36	–	–	40	42	
Norway
Jo Inge Bjørnebye	31 October 1946	–	–	31	–	11	7	
Lars Grini	29 June 1944	–	–	13	3	3	11	
Ingolf Mork	4 June 1947	–	–	–	–	9	25	
Bjørn Wirkola	4 August 1943	1	1	4	23	13	27	
Poland
Jan Bieniek	1947	–	–	–	–	–	–	
Stanisław Gąsienica Daniel	6 March 1951	–	–	–	–	33	3	
Józef Kocyan	14 February 1946	37	–	35	45	–	57	
Adam Krzysztofiak	21 January 1951	–	–	–	–	41	–	
Tadeusz Pawlusiak	9 August 1946	–	–	–	–	12	34	
Józef Przybyła	29 January 1945	13	30	27	14	39	34	
Romania
Anghel Biris	Unknown	–	–	–	–	63	61	
Dumitru Lupu	Unknown	–	–	–	–	64	67	
Soviet Union
Vladimir Belousov	14 July 1946	–	–	8	1	6	18	
Aleksandr Ivannikov	23 January 1945	10	15	–	–	34	–	
Gariy Napalkov	27 June 1948	–	–	14	11	1	1	
Koba Zakadze	15 June 1934	–	6	–	–	22	22	
Anatoly Zheglanov	14 May 1946	–	–	6	8	–	12	
Sweden
Eilert Mähler	1950	–	–	–	–	23	45	
Karl-Erik Johansson	Unknown	–	–	–	–	5	20	
Tommy Karlsson	Unknown	–	–	–	–	46	31	
Lars Ström	Unknown	–	–	–	–	47	49	
Switzerland
Richard Pfiffner	Unknown	57	46	–	–	49	46	
Hans Schmid	24 June 1948	–	–	–	–	16	10	
Walter Steiner	15 February 1951	–	–	–	–	28	23	
Josef Zehnder	25 March 1944	34	27	52	47	10	14	
United States
Bill Bakke	20 November 1946	–	–	40	34	35	54	
Jerry Martin	18 August 1950	–	–	–	–	44	48	
Greg Swor	19 April 1951	–	–	–	–	24	27	
Adrian Watt	29 December 1947	–	–	44	–	25	53	
Yugoslavia
Branko Dolhar	2 February 1949	–	–	–	–	60	–	
Janez Jurman	10 June 1946	–	–	–	–	56	–	
Marjan Mesec	14 August 1947	–	–	38	–	–	59	
Drago Pudgar	27 September 1949	–	–	–	–	–	47	
Peter Štefančič	3 March 1947	–	–	–	38	36	43	
Ludvik Zajc	21 January 1943	40	42	14	9	19	15	
West Germany
Günther Göllner	21 June 1941	29	–	10	29	42	50	
Alfred Grosche	20 January 1950	–	–	–	–	54	56	
Heinz Ihle	24 April 1941	–	–	22	46	27	29	
Sepp Schwinghammer	21 September 1950	–	–	–	–	50	64	
