= 1970–71 Four Hills Tournament =

Ski jumping competition

Four Hills Tournament
- Venues: Schattenbergschanze, Bergiselschanze, Große Olympiaschanze, Paul-Ausserleitner-Schanze
- Location: Germany, Austria
- Dates: 30 December 1970 – 6 January 1971
- Competitors: 84 from 13 nations

Medalists
gold medal	(Czechoslovakia) Jiří Raška
silver medal	(Norway) Ingolf Mork
bronze medal	(Czechoslovakia) Zbynek Hubac

In 1971, Jiří Raška became the first Czechoslovak to win the Four Hills Tournament. For the first time, an athlete who won three out of four events did not end up winning the tournament after Ingolf Mork lost twenty points to Raška and Hubac in Innsbruck.

For the first time in four years, Raška did not actually win any event in the tournament. It was a desolate year for the two host nations: No athlete from Germany or Austria placed in the Top 15 at any event.

== Participating nations and athletes ==
The national groups of Germany and Austria only competed at the two events in their respective countries.

Nation	Number of Athletes	Athletes
Germany	8 (+8)	Günther Göllner, Alfred Grosche, Wilhelm Haydt, Franz Keller, Henrik Ohlmayr, Sepp Schwinghammer, Ernst Wursthorn, Bernd Zapf; National Group: Tim Ackermann, Georg Bühl, Peter Dubb, Helmut Fischer, Toni Guggemoos, Peter Hauser, Heini Ihle, Heinz Rudhart
Austria	9 (+8)	Reinhold Bachler, Helmut Diess, Max Golser, Walter Habersatter, Ernst Kröll, Sepp Lichtenegger, Franz Salhofer, Siegfried Scheutz, Walter Schwabl, National Group: Edi Federer, Hermann Heindl, Hans Millonig, Karl Schnabl, Hans Wallner, Rudolf Wanner, Ernst Wimmer, Harald Winkler
Czechoslovakia	7	Bohumil Doležal, Rudolf Doubek, Rudolf Höhnl, Zbynek Hubac, Josef Kraus, Bohuslav Novák, Jiří Raška
East Germany	5	Bernd Eckstein, Henry Glaß, Horst Queck, Eberhard Seifert, Wolfgang Stöhr
Finland	3	Tauno Käyhkö, Matti Niemi, Juhani Ruotsalainen
France	3	Jacques Gaillard, Alain Macle, Gilbert Poirot
Hungary	3	Mihály Gellér, Gyula Molnár, Antal Zámbó
Italy	4	Giacomo Aimoni, Albino Bazana, Mario Ceccon, Bruno Patti
Norway	6	Jo Inge Bjørnebye, Odd Grette, Ingolf Mork, Didrik Müller Ellefsen, Frithjof Prydz, Bent Tomtum
Poland	6	Jan Bieniek, Stanisław Gąsienica Daniel, Adam Krzysztofiak, Tadeusz Pawlusiak, Józef Przybyla, Ryszard Witke
Sweden	4	Karl-Erik Johansson, Eilerth Mähler, Håkon Lindbäck, Rolf Nordgren
Switzerland	4	Hans Schmid, Walter Steiner, Ernst von Grünigen, Sepp Zehnder
United States	4	Bill Bakke, Scott Berry, Bruce Jennings, Greg Swor
Yugoslavia	6	Janez Demsa, Branko Dolhar, Marjan Mesec, Drago Pudgar, Peter Štefančič, Ludvik Zajc

== Results ==
=== Oberstdorf ===
(Germany) Schattenbergschanze, Oberstdorf
30 December 1970

Rank	Name	Points
1	(Norway) Ingolf Mork	235.8
2	(Norway) Bent Tomtum	234.1
3	(Poland) Tadeusz Pawlusiak	233.7
4	(Czechoslovakia) Zbynek Hubac	232.5
5	(Czechoslovakia) Jiří Raška	227.5
6	(Czechoslovakia) Rudolf Höhnl	221.6
7	(East Germany) Horst Queck	221.2
8	(East Germany) Bernd Eckstein	221.1
9	(Finland) Tauno Käyhkö	220.5
10	(Poland) Józef Przybyla	220.0

=== Garmisch-Partenkirchen ===
(Germany) Große Olympiaschanze, Garmisch-Partenkirchen
1 January 1971

Rank	Name	Points
1	(Norway) Ingolf Mork	238.0
2	(Czechoslovakia) Jiří Raška	235.5
3	(Finland) Tauno Käyhkö	229.0
4	(Norway) Jo Inge Bjørnebye	225.0
5	(Czechoslovakia) Zbynek Hubac	222.5
6	(Norway) Didrik Müller Ellefsen	220.5
7	(East Germany) Bernd Eckstein	220.0
8	(Norway) Odd Grette	218.0
8	(Norway) Frithjof Prydz	218.0
10	(Czechoslovakia) Bohuslav Novák	217.5

=== Innsbruck ===
(Austria) Bergiselschanze, Innsbruck
3 January 1971

Rank	Name	Points
1	(Czechoslovakia) Zbynek Hubac	246.0
2	(Czechoslovakia) Jiří Raška	243.9
3	(Czechoslovakia) Rudolf Höhnl	240.2
4	(Norway) Bent Tomtum	237.0
5	(Czechoslovakia) Josef Kraus	235.9
6	(Switzerland) Walter Steiner	235.4
7	(Finland) Tauno Käyhkö	234.1
8	(Norway) Jo Inge Bjørnebye	233.8
9	(Czechoslovakia) Bohumil Doležal	230.9
10	(Switzerland) Hans Schmid	228.4

=== Bischofshofen ===
(Austria) Paul-Ausserleitner-Schanze, Bischofshofen
6 January 1971

Rank	Name	Points
1	(Norway) Ingolf Mork	241.2
2	(Czechoslovakia) Jiří Raška	238.9
3	(Czechoslovakia) Zbynek Hubac	226.6
4	(Finland) Tauno Käyhkö	225.5
5	(Poland) Tadeusz Pawlusiak	224.8
6	(Switzerland) Walter Steiner	223.3
7	(Norway) Frithjof Prydz	220.8
8	(Czechoslovakia) Josef Kraus	220.7
9	(Czechoslovakia) Bohumil Doležal	220.6
10	(Czechoslovakia) Rudolf Höhnl	219.8
10	(Norway) Didrik Müller Ellefsen	219.8

== Final ranking ==
Rank	Name	Oberstdorf	Garmisch-Partenkirchen	Innsbruck	Bischofshofen	Points
1	(Czechoslovakia) Jiří Raška	5th	2nd	2nd	2nd	945.8
2	(Norway) Ingolf Mork	1st	1st	16th	1st	938.7
3	(Czechoslovakia) Zbynek Hubac	4th	5th	1st	3rd	927.6
4	(Finland) Tauno Käyhkö	9th	3rd	7th	4th	909.1
5	(Czechoslovakia) Rudolf Höhnl	6th	11th	3rd	11th	897.1
6	(Poland) Tadeusz Pawlusiak	3rd	13th	22nd	5th	890.9
7	(Norway) Jo Inge Bjørnebye	11th	4th	8th	14th	890.7
8	(Switzerland) Walter Steiner	12th	24th	6th	6th	881.3
9	(Norway) Frithjof Prydz	14th	8th	12th	7th	879.5
10	(East Germany) Bernd Eckstein	8th	7th	20th	16th	870.6
