= 1969–70 Four Hills Tournament =

Ski jumping competition

Four Hills Tournament
- Venues: Schattenbergschanze, Bergiselschanze, Große Olympiaschanze, Paul-Ausserleitner-Schanze
- Location: Germany, Austria
- Dates: 28 December 1969 – 6 January 1970
- Competitors: 100 from 17 nations

Medalists
gold medal	(East Germany) Horst Queck
silver medal	(Norway) Bjørn Wirkola
bronze medal	(Soviet Union) Gariy Napalkov

The 1969–70 Four Hills Tournament was a German-Austrian skiing tournament in 1969 and 1970.

== Participating nations and athletes ==
Nation	Number of Athletes	Athletes
Germany	14	Peter Dubb, Günther Göllner, Alfred Grosche, Wilhelm Haydt, Heini Ihle, Friedhelm Klapproth, Walter Lampe, Lothar Lottes, Henrik Ohlmayr, Ralph Pöhland, Oswald Schinze, Sepp Schwinghammer, Alfred Winkler, Ernst Wursthorn
Austria	12	Reinhold Bachler, Helmut Diess, Max Golser, Walter Habersatter, Ernst Kröll, Sepp Lichtenegger, Franz Salhofer, Siegfried Scheutz, Willi Schuster, Erich Schwabl, Ernst Wimmer, Harald Winkler
Canada	5	Ulf Kvendbo, John McInnes, Zdenek Mezl, Patrick Morris, Claude Trahar
Czechoslovakia	7	Rudolf Doubek, Rudolf Höhnl, Zbynek Hubac, Karel Kodejška, Jan Matouš, Jiří Raška, František Rydval
East Germany	6	Jürgen Dommerich, Christian Kiehl, Horst Queck, Heinz Schmidt, Rainer Schmidt, Clemens Walter
Finland	3	Tauno Käyhkö, Juhanni Putkonen, Rauli Tupurainen
France	3	Alain Macle, Gilbert Poirot, James Yerrly
Hungary	3	László Gellér, Mihály Gellér, Gyula Molnár
Italy	4	Giacomo Aimoni, Albino Bazana, Mario Ceccon, Bruno Patti
Japan	5	Masakatsu Asari, Takashi Fujisawa, Yukio Kasaya, Nobukazu Saitō, Kinuo Watanabe
Norway	5	Lars Grini, Ingolf Mork, Frithjof Prydz, Bent Tomtum, Bjørn Wirkola
Poland	7	Jan Bieniek, Stanisław Gąsienica Daniel, Stanisław Kubica, Tadeusz Pawlusiak, Józef Przybyla, Andrej Sztolf, Ryszard Witke
Soviet Union	6	Vladimir Belousov, Wladimir Galkin, Aleksandr Ivannikov, Gariy Napalkov, Vladimir Smirnov, Anatoliy Zheglanov
Sweden	3	Karl-Erik Johansson, Eilerth Mähler, Lars Ström
Switzerland	4	Richard Pfiffner, Hans Schmid, Walter Steiner, Sepp Zehnder
United States	9	Bill Bakke, Tim Denisson, Ken Harkins, Bruce Jennings, Georg Krog, Jay Martin, Dave Norby, Greg Swor, Adrian Watt
Yugoslavia	5	Branko Dolhar, Janez Jurman, Marjan Mesec, Peter Štefančič, Ludvik Zajc

== Results ==
=== Oberstdorf ===
(Germany) Schattenbergschanze, Oberstdorf
28 December 1969

Rank	Name	Points
1	(Soviet Union) Gariy Napalkov	225.7
2	(East Germany) Horst Queck	223.8
3	(Czechoslovakia) Josef Matouš	223.3
4	(Norway) Lars Grini	222.9
5	(Norway) Bjørn Wirkola	221.3
6	(East Germany) Christian Kiehl	218.2
7	(Czechoslovakia) Jiří Raška	215.3
8	(Japan) Takashi Fujisawa	213.9
9	(Norway) Ingolf Mork	213.8
10	(East Germany) Clemens Walter	213.4

=== Garmisch-Partenkirchen ===
(Germany) Große Olympiaschanze, Garmisch-Partenkirchen
1 January 1970

Rank	Name	Points
1	(Czechoslovakia) Jiří Raška	241.4
2	(Soviet Union) Anatoliy Zheglanov	233.2
3	(Soviet Union) Vladimir Belousov	230.2
4	(Norway) Lars Grini	227.1
4	(Czechoslovakia) Jan Matouš	227.1
6	(Czechoslovakia) Rudolf Höhnl	226.1
7	(East Germany) Christian Kiehl	225.5
8	(Poland) Stanisław Gąsienica Daniel	223.8
9	(Soviet Union) Aleksandr Ivannikov	222.8
10	(East Germany) Horst Queck	221.4

=== Innsbruck ===
(Austria) Bergiselschanze, Innsbruck
4 December 1970

Rank	Name	Points
1	(Norway) Bjørn Wirkola	248.5
2	(East Germany) Horst Queck	246.0
3	(Soviet Union) Anatoliy Zheglanov	237.8
4	(Soviet Union) Gariy Napalkov	232.1
5	(East Germany) Heinz Schmidt	227.6
6	(East Germany) Rainer Schmidt	225.8
7	(Austria) Reinhold Bachler	224.8
8	(Poland) Tadeusz Pawlusiak	216.2
9	(Switzerland) Hans Schmid	212.0
10	(Germany) Alfred Grosche	211.8

=== Bischofshofen ===
(Austria) Paul-Ausserleitner-Schanze, Bischofshofen
6 January 1970

Rank	Name	Points
1	(Czechoslovakia) Jiří Raška	235.4
2	(East Germany) Rainer Schmidt	232.9
3	(Norway) Bjørn Wirkola	232.3
4	(East Germany) Horst Queck	232.2
5	(Soviet Union) Gariy Napalkov	226.3
6	(Czechoslovakia) Rudolf Höhnl	225.2
7	(Soviet Union) Aleksandr Ivannikov	223.3
8	(Norway) Ingolf Mork	218.3
9	(Norway) Frithjof Prydz	216.0
10	(Japan) Masakatsu Asari	215.6

== Final ranking ==
Rank	Name	Oberstdorf	Garmisch-Partenkirchen	Innsbruck	Bischofshofen	Points
1	(East Germany) Horst Queck	2nd	10th	2nd	4th	923.4
2	(Norway) Bjørn Wirkola	5th	16th	1st	3rd	920.6
3	(Soviet Union) Gariy Napalkov	1st	18th	4th	5th	901.5
4	(Czechoslovakia) Jiří Raška	7th	1st	23rd	1st	895.2
5	(East Germany) Rainer Schmidt	14th	14th	6th	2nd	890.3
6	(Czechoslovakia) Rudolf Höhnl	20th	6th	12th	6th	869.8
7	(Soviet Union) Anatoliy Zheglanov	53rd	2nd	3rd	14th	867.7
8	(Norway) Ingolf Mork	9th	13th	17th	8th	860.4
9	(East Germany) Heinz Schmidt	17th	15th	5th	24th	860.0
10	(Japan) Yukio Kasaya	12th	20th	15th	11th	852.2
