= Ski jumping at the 1972 Winter Olympics – Large hill individual =

Men's large hill individual at the XI Olympic Winter Games
- Pictogram for ski jumping
- Venue: Okurayama Ski Jump Stadium
- Dates: February 11, 1972
- Competitors: 52 from 15 nations
- Winning score: 219.9

Medalists
1st place, gold medalist(s)		Wojciech Fortuna; Poland
2nd place, silver medalist(s)		Walter Steiner; Switzerland
3rd place, bronze medalist(s)		Rainer Schmidt; East Germany

The men's large hill individual ski jumping competition for the 1972 Winter Olympics was held in Okurayama Ski Jump Stadium. It occurred on 11 February.

In the competition on the Okurayama jumping hill, conditions were "variable and unfair" according to a Norwegian account of the 1972 Games published in 2006, and the result is described as "the greatest surprise of all time on the jumping hill". In the first run, the 19-year-old Zakopane mechanic Wojciech Fortuna completed a leap of 111 metres, while Manfred Wolf of East Germany was runner-up after the first run having jumped 107 metres. Jiří Raška, Gariy Napalkov and Tauno Käyhkö, all counted among the favourites according to Jorsett's account, were all more than 12 metres behind, Yukio Kasaya, who won on the normal hill, landed on 90 metres, and Ingolf Mork, the 1972 Four Hills Tournament winner, touched down on 88 metres.

Fortuna's second jump was a more modest 87.5 metres; still, the tenths of a point remained on his side. Again according to Jorsett, Steiner (103 metres), Schmidt (101 metres) and Käyhkö (100.5 metres) got lucky with the wind in the second run, but all finished within 0.7 points of Fortuna. This was the smallest margin between first and fourth to date.

Pudgar's eighth place was the best placing by a Yugoslav at the Winter Olympics ski jumping until Matjaž Debelak won bronze at the 1988 Winter Olympics, and the best placing by a Yugoslav athlete at any Winter Olympic event until alpine skier Bojan Križaj finished fourth in giant slalom at the 1980 Winter Olympics.

== Results ==
Rank	Athlete	Country	Jump 1	Jump 2	Total
1st place, gold medalist(s)	Wojciech Fortuna	Poland	130.4	89.5	219.9
2nd place, silver medalist(s)	Walter Steiner	Switzerland	101.6	118.2	219.8
3rd place, bronze medalist(s)	Rainer Schmidt	East Germany	106.4	112.9	219.3
4	Tauno Käyhkö	Finland	104.5	114.7	219.2
5	Manfred Wolf	East Germany	120.3	94.8	215.1
6	Gariy Napalkov	Soviet Union	111.3	98.8	210.1
7	Yukio Kasaya	Japan	124.9	84.5	209.4
8	Danilo Pudgar	Yugoslavia	98.5	107.5	206.0
9	Esko Rautionaho	Finland	95.7	110.1	205.8
10	Jiří Raška	Czechoslovakia	111.1	93.6	204.7
11	Rolf Nordgren	Sweden	105.5	98.0	203.5
12	Akitsugu Konno	Japan	109.7	89.4	199.1
13	Kari Ylianttila	Finland	99.1	98.3	197.4
14	Takashi Fujisawa	Japan	107.2	89.9	197.1
15	Zbyněk Hubač	Czechoslovakia	96.1	98.6	194.7
15	Frithjof Prydz	Norway	89.0	105.7	194.7
17	Zdenek Mezl	Canada	104.7	89.6	194.3
18	Tadeusz Pawlusiak	Poland	89.3	94.0	183.3
19	Hiroshi Itagaki	Japan	96.0	87.1	183.1
20	Henry Glaß	East Germany	97.9	85.1	183.0
21	Sergey Yanin	Soviet Union	93.1	88.3	181.4
22	Josef Zehnder	Switzerland	97.0	84.1	181.1
23	Drago Pudgar	Yugoslavia	95.6	84.1	179.7
24	Reinhold Bachler	Austria	88.9	90.3	179.2
25	Ron Steele	United States	86.6	91.1	177.7
26	Leoš Škoda	Czechoslovakia	96.3	80.0	176.3
27	Günther Göllner	West Germany	93.0	82.3	175.3
28	Ingolf Mork	Norway	95.6	77.7	173.3
29	Adam Krzysztofiak	Poland	85.6	87.5	173.1
30	Greg Swor	United States	77.2	95.6	172.8
31	Stanisław Gąsienica Daniel	Poland	83.2	87.9	171.1
32	Rauno Miettinen	Finland	79.7	91.0	170.7
32	Anatoly Zheglanov	Soviet Union	73.7	97.0	170.7
34	Jo Inge Bjørnebye	Norway	86.7	81.1	167.8
35	K'oba Ts'akadze	Soviet Union	69.7	95.5	165.2
36	Jerry Martin	United States	89.1	74.0	163.1
37	Bjørn Wirkola	Norway	97.7	64.8	162.5
37	Marjan Mesec	Yugoslavia	78.7	83.8	162.5
39	Peter Wilson	Canada	78.7	80.9	159.6
40	Heinz Wosipiwo	East Germany	74.3	85.3	159.6
41	Anders Lundqvist	Sweden	85.8	72.2	158.0
42	Hans Schmid	Switzerland	101.8	54.6	156.4
43	Max Golser	Austria	84.9	68.7	153.6
44	Ernst von Grünigen	Switzerland	79.8	73.2	153.0
45	Ulf Kvendbo	Canada	75.6	77.0	152.6
46	Rudi Wanner	Austria	69.6	82.7	152.3
47	Scott Berry	United States	76.1	75.6	151.7
48	Peter Štefančič	Yugoslavia	67.6	77.6	145.2
49	Yvan Richard	France	68.8	73.4	142.2
50	Alain Macle	France	65.9	56.9	122.8
51	Jacques Gaillard	France	60.8	61.9	122.7
52	Alfred Grosche	West Germany	44.6	75.0	119.6
