= Ski jumping at the 1972 Winter Olympics – Normal hill individual =

Men's normal hill individual at the XI Olympic Winter Games
- Pictogram for ski jumping
- Venue: Miyanomori Ski Jump Stadium
- Dates: 6 February 1972
- Competitors: 56 from 26 nations
- Winning score: 244.2

Medalists
1st place, gold medalist(s)		Yukio Kasaya; Japan
2nd place, silver medalist(s)		Akitsugu Konno; Japan
3rd place, bronze medalist(s)		Seiji Aochi; Japan

The men's normal hill individual ski jumping competition for the 1972 Winter Olympics was held at Miyanomori Ski Jump Stadium. It occurred on 6 February.

== Results ==
Rank	Athlete	Country	Jump 1	Jump 2	Total
1st place, gold medalist(s)	Yukio Kasaya	Japan	126.6	117.6	244.2
2nd place, silver medalist(s)	Akitsugu Konno	Japan	120.2	114.6	234.8
3rd place, bronze medalist(s)	Seiji Aochi	Japan	123.3	106.2	229.5
4	Ingolf Mork	Norway	112.0	113.5	225.5
5	Jiří Raška	Czechoslovakia	112.3	112.5	224.8
6	Wojciech Fortuna	Poland	115.4	106.6	222.0
7	Karel Kodejška	Czechoslovakia	114.7	105.5	220.2
7	Gariy Napalkov	Soviet Union	112.4	107.8	220.2
9	K'oba Ts'akadze	Soviet Union	109.7	110.2	219.9
10	Peter Štefančič	Yugoslavia	107.9	110.2	218.1
11	Rolf Nordgren	Sweden	115.7	102.1	217.8
11	Frithjof Prydz	Norway	114.2	103.6	217.8
11	Zbyněk Hubač	Czechoslovakia	113.1	104.7	217.8
14	Walter Steiner	Switzerland	110.6	106.8	217.4
15	Rainer Schmidt	East Germany	114.5	102.7	217.2
16	Ernst von Grünigen	Switzerland	109.5	102.9	212.4
17	Rauno Miettinen	Finland	105.5	106.5	212.0
18	Henry Glaß	East Germany	109.5	102.3	211.8
18	Tauno Käyhkö	Finland	105.8	106.0	211.8
20	Yury Kalinin	Soviet Union	111.8	99.8	211.6
21	Anatoly Zheglanov	Soviet Union	102.3	107.7	210.0
22	Hans Schmid	Switzerland	106.6	102.3	208.9
23	Takashi Fujisawa	Japan	117.8	90.0	207.8
24	Adam Krzysztofiak	Poland	105.0	102.3	207.3
25	Kari Ylianttila	Finland	104.8	101.8	206.6
26	Rudi Wanner	Austria	104.4	100.6	205.0
27	Danilo Pudgar	Yugoslavia	112.4	92.3	204.7
28	Josef Zehnder	Switzerland	105.8	97.9	203.7
29	Rudolf Höhnl	Czechoslovakia	100.8	100.8	201.6
29	Reinhold Bachler	Austria	100.3	101.3	201.6
31	Hans-Georg Aschenbach	East Germany	103.1	95.4	198.5
32	Tadeusz Pawlusiak	Poland	98.8	99.1	197.9
33	Nils-Per Skarseth	Norway	101.3	96.3	197.6
34	Jerry Martin	United States	105.3	91.9	197.2
35	Drago Pudgar	Yugoslavia	97.8	99.3	197.1
36	Max Golser	Austria	95.5	100.3	195.8
37	Marjan Mesec	Yugoslavia	100.1	95.3	195.4
38	Manfred Wolf	East Germany	109.2	85.8	195.0
39	Stanisław Gąsienica Daniel	Poland	97.3	96.7	194.0
40	Zdenek Mezl	Canada	100.6	92.2	192.8
41	Ron Steele	United States	99.2	93.1	192.3
42	Anders Lundqvist	Sweden	98.3	93.5	191.8
43	Gilbert Poirot	France	93.4	95.3	188.7
44	Ulf Kvendbo	Canada	93.0	94.8	187.8
45	Esko Rautionaho	Finland	100.3	87.4	187.7
46	Günther Göllner	West Germany	101.6	84.3	185.9
47	Alfred Grosche	West Germany	92.2	90.6	182.8
48	Rick Gulyas	Canada	90.8	90.5	181.3
49	Sepp Schwinghammer	West Germany	89.8	90.3	180.1
50	Greg Swor	United States	93.0	86.4	179.4
51	Jo Inge Bjørnebye	Norway	90.3	83.9	174.2
52	Scott Berry	United States	87.7	84.3	172.0
53	Alain Macle	France	87.2	78.7	165.9
54	Yvan Richard	France	88.0	76.3	164.3
55	Ezio Damolin	Italy	87.0	75.7	162.7
56	Peter Wilson	Canada	79.4	70.0	149.4
