= Sweden at the 1972 Winter Olympics =

- IOC code: SWE
- NOC: Swedish Olympic Committee
- Website: www.sok.se (in Swedish and English)

in Sapporo
- Competitors: 58 (49 men, 9 women) in 9 sports
- Flag bearer: Hasse Börjes (Speed skating)
- Medals Ranked 10th: Gold 1 Silver 1 Bronze 2 Total 4

Winter Olympics appearances (overview)
- 1924; 1928; 1932; 1936; 1948; 1952; 1956; 1960; 1964; 1968; 1972; 1976; 1980; 1984; 1988; 1992; 1994; 1998; 2002; 2006; 2010; 2014; 2018; 2022; 2026

Sweden competed at the 1972 Winter Olympics in Sapporo, Japan.

== Medalists ==
Medal	Name	Sport	Event
Gold	Sven-Åke Lundbäck	Cross-country skiing	Men's 15 km
Silver	Hasse Börjes	Speed skating	Men's 500 m
Bronze	Lars-Göran Arwidson	Biathlon	Men's 20 km
Bronze	Göran Claeson	Speed skating	Men's 1500 m

== Alpine skiing ==
Men

Athlete	Event	Race 1		Race 2		Total	
Athlete	Event	Time	Rank	Time	Rank	Time	Rank
Olle Rolén	Downhill					1:59.28	34
Manni Thofte	Downhill					1:56.66	28
Manni Thofte	Giant Slalom	DNF	–	–	–	DNF	–
Olle Rolén	Giant Slalom	DNF	–	–	–	DNF	–
Sven Mikaelsson	Giant Slalom	1:37.88	29	1:43.77	27	3:21.65	28

Men's slalom

Athlete	Classification		Final					
Athlete	Time	Rank	Time 1	Rank	Time 2	Rank	Total	Rank
Olle Rolén	1:47.88	3	1:01.19	28	DNF	–	DNF	–
Sven Mikaelsson	1:48.03	5	1:01.00	26	1:00.72	23	2:01.72	21
Manni Thofte	DNF	–	1:01.14	27	DNF	–	DNF	–

Women

Athlete	Event	Race 1		Race 2		Total	
Athlete	Event	Time	Rank	Time	Rank	Time	Rank
Lotta Sollander	Downhill					1:42.97	31
Lotta Sollander	Giant Slalom					DNF	–
Lotta Sollander	Slalom	DNF	–	–	–	DNF	–

== Biathlon ==
Men

Event	Athlete	Time	Penalties	Adjusted time ^{1}	Rank
20 km	Torsten Wadman	1'17:17.56	13	1'30:17.56	49
20 km	Olle Petrusson	1'16:40.58	12	1'28:40.58	42
20 km	Holmfrid Olsson	1'19:28.78	3	1'22:28.78	21
20 km	Lars-Göran Arwidson	1'14:27.03	2	1'16:27.03	3rd place, bronze medalist(s)

^{1} One minute added per close miss (a hit in the outer ring), two minutes added per complete miss.

Men's 4 x 7.5 km relay

Athletes	Race		
Athletes	Misses ^{2}	Time	Rank
Lars-Göran Arwidson; Olle Petrusson; Torsten Wadman; Holmfrid Olsson	6	1'56:57.40	5

^{2} A penalty loop of 200 metres had to be skied per missed target.

== Bobsleigh ==
Sled	Athletes	Event	Run 1		Run 2		Run 3		Run 4		Total	
Sled	Athletes	Event	Time	Rank	Time	Rank	Time	Rank	Time	Rank	Time	Rank
SWE-1	Carl-Erik Eriksson; Jan Johansson	Two-man	1:16.68	9	1:16.81	10	1:14.08	4	1:13.83	2	5:01.40	6

Sled	Athletes	Event	Run 1		Run 2		Run 3		Run 4		Total	
Sled	Athletes	Event	Time	Rank	Time	Rank	Time	Rank	Time	Rank	Time	Rank
SWE-1	Carl-Erik Eriksson; Tom Mentzer; Thomas Gustafsson; Jan Johansson	Four-man	1:12.14	12	1:12.42	8	1:11.43	13	1:11.41	9	4:47.40	11

== Cross-country skiing ==
Men

Event	Athlete	Race	
Event	Athlete	Time	Rank
15 km	Tord Backman	47:22.97	20
15 km	Lars-Göran Åslund	46:56.23	18
15 km	Gunnar Larsson	46:23.29	8
15 km	Sven-Åke Lundbäck	45:28.24	1st place, gold medalist(s)
30 km	Thomas Magnuson	1'43:26.02	28
30 km	Sven-Åke Lundbäck	1'39:54.35	13
30 km	Lars-Göran Åslund	1'39:45.29	11
30 km	Gunnar Larsson	1'37:33.72	4
50 km	Gunnar Larsson	2'51:17.56	20
50 km	Tord Backman	2'48:53.51	13
50 km	Hans-Erik Larsson	2'47:59.37	11
50 km	Lars-Arne Bölling	2'45:06.80	7

Men's 4 × 10 km relay

Athletes	Race	
Athletes	Time	Rank
Thomas Magnuson; Lars-Göran Åslund; Gunnar Larsson; Sven-Åke Lundbäck	2'07:03.60	4

Women

Event	Athlete	Race	
Event	Athlete	Time	Rank
5 km	Meeri Bodelid	18:29.07	33
5 km	Birgitta Lindqvist	18:25.88	32
5 km	Barbro Tano	17:54.53	19
5 km	Eva Olsson	17:46.66	15
10 km	Birgitta Lindqvist	37:24.76	28
10 km	Eva Olsson	36:46.50	23
10 km	Meeri Bodelid	36:41.52	19
10 km	Barbro Tano	36:29.34	13

Women's 3 × 5 km relay

Athletes	Race	
Athletes	Time	Rank
Meeri Bodelid; Eva Olsson; Birgitta Lindqvist	51:51.84	8

== Figure skating ==
Women

Athlete	CF	FS	Points	Places	Rank
Anita Johansson	14	15	2349.3	131	15

== Ice hockey ==
Summary

Team	Event	First round	Final round / Consolation round					
Team	Event	Opposition Score	Opposition Score	Opposition Score	Opposition Score	Opposition Score	Opposition Score	Rank
Sweden men's	Men's tournament	Yugoslavia; **W** 8–1	United States; **W** 5–1	Soviet Union; **T** 3–3	Poland; **W** 5–3	Czechoslovakia; **L** 1–2	Finland; **L** 3–4	4

=== First round ===
Winners (in bold) entered the medal round. Other teams played a consolation round for 7th-11th places.

Team 1	Score	Team 2
**Sweden**	8–1	(Socialist Federal Republic of Yugoslavia) Yugoslavia

=== Medal round ===
Rank	Team	Pld	W	L	T	GF	GA	Pts
1	Soviet Union	5	4	0	1	33	13	9
2	United States	5	3	2	0	18	15	6
3	Czechoslovakia	5	3	2	0	26	13	6
4	Sweden	5	2	2	1	17	13	5
5	Finland	5	2	3	0	14	24	4
6	Poland	5	0	5	0	9	39	0

- Sweden 5–1 USA
- USSR 3–3 Sweden
- Sweden 5–3 Poland
- Czechoslovakia 2–1 Sweden
- Finland 4–3 Sweden

**Contestants**; Leif Holmqvist; Christer Abrahamsson; Thommy Abrahamsson; Lars-Erik Sjöberg; Kjell-Rune Milton; Stig Östling; Bert-Ola Nordlander; Kenneth Ekman; Tord Lundström; Lars-Göran Nilsson; Håkan Pettersson; Håkan Wickberg; Mats Åhlberg; Björn Palmqvist; Hans Hansson; Inge Hammarström; Hans Lindberg; Thommie Bergman; Stig-Göran Johansson; Mats Lindh

== Nordic combined ==
Events:

- normal hill ski jumping (Three jumps, best two counted and shown here.)
- 15 km cross-country skiing

Athlete	Event	Ski Jumping				Cross-country			Total	
Athlete	Event	Distance 1	Distance 2	Points	Rank	Time	Points	Rank	Points	Rank
Sven-Olof Israelsson	Individual	64.0	62.0	130.3	39	51:24.9	193.000	20	323.300	36

== Ski jumping ==
Athlete	Event	Jump 1		Jump 2		Total	
Athlete	Event	Distance	Points	Distance	Points	Points	Rank
Anders Lundqvist	Normal hill	71.0	98.3	68.0	93.5	191.8	42
Rolf Nordgren	Normal hill	82.5	115.7	74.0	102.1	217.8	11
Anders Lundqvist	Large hill	84.5	85.8	78.0	72.2	158.0	41
Rolf Nordgren	Large hill	97.5	105.5	92.5	98.0	203.5	11

== Speed skating ==
Men

Event	Athlete	Race	
Event	Athlete	Time	Rank
500 m	Johan Granath	40.79	16
500 m	Mats Wallberg	40.41	9
500 m	Ove König	40.25	7
500 m	Hasse Börjes	39.69	2nd place, silver medalist(s)
1500 m	Johan Granath	2:10.21	16
1500 m	Göran Johansson	2:09.66	15
1500 m	Johnny Höglin	2:08.11	9
1500 m	Göran Claeson	2:05.89	3rd place, bronze medalist(s)
5000 m	Örjan Sandler	7:47.92	14
5000 m	Johnny Höglin	7:45.68	12
5000 m	Göran Claeson	7:36.17	4
10,000 m	Örjan Sandler	16:04.90	15
10,000 m	Göran Claeson	15:30.19	6

Women

Event	Athlete	Race	
Event	Athlete	Time	Rank
500 m	Sylvia Filipsson	46.78	23
500 m	Ylva Hedlund	46.24	18
500 m	Ann-Sofie Järnström	45.83	15
1000 m	Sylvia Filipsson	1:37.24	30
1000 m	Ann-Sofie Järnström	1:35.21	19
1000 m	Ylva Hedlund	1:33.82	14
1500 m	Ann-Sofie Järnström	2:31.53	26
1500 m	Ylva Hedlund	2:31.31	25
1500 m	Sylvia Filipsson	2:29.38	20
3000 m	Sylvia Filipsson	5:11.13	14
