= Copper Peak =

Ski flying hill

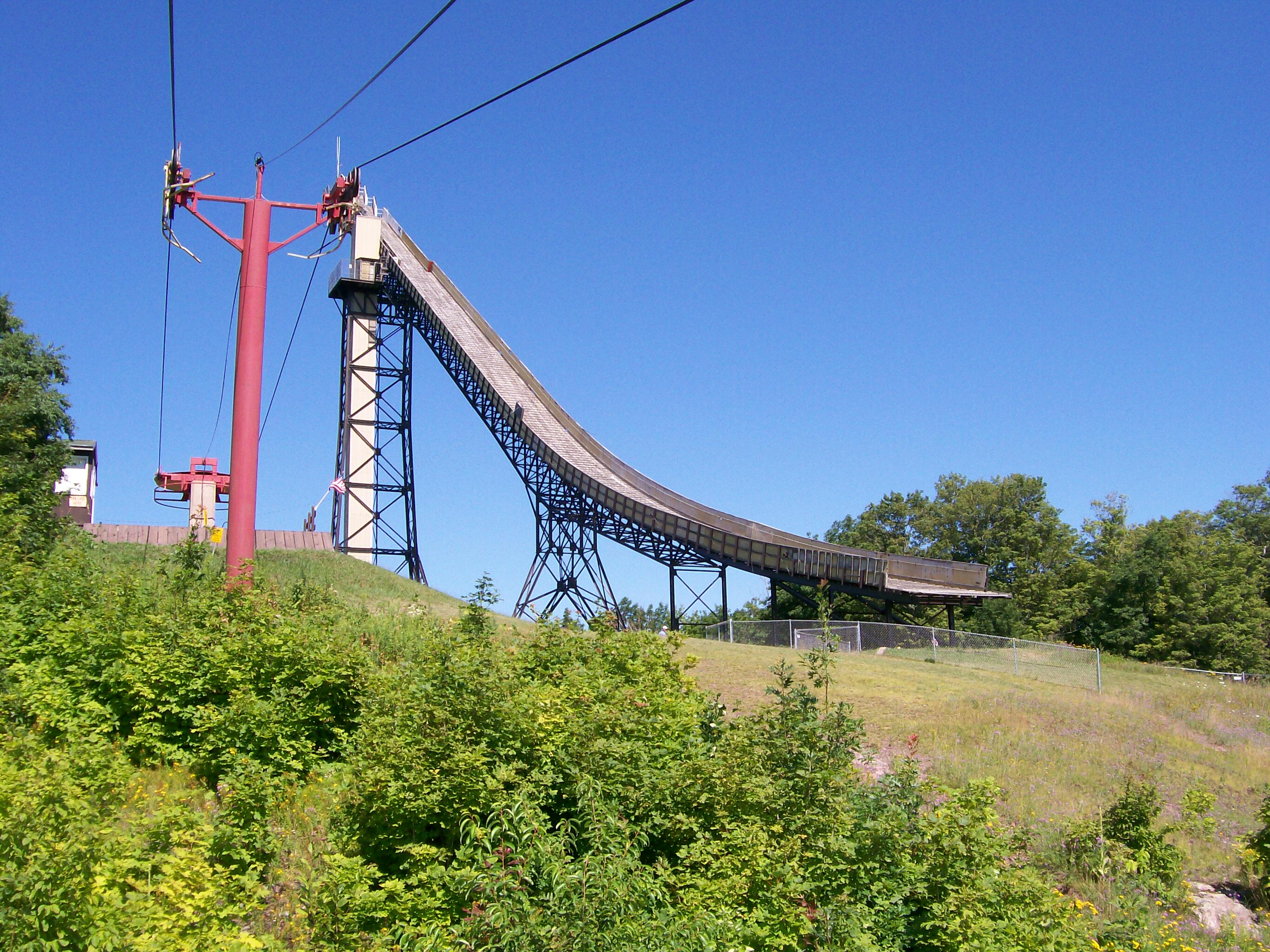
- Constructor: Lauren Larsen
- Location: Ironwood, Michigan, USA
- Operator: Gogebic Range Ski Club
- Opened: 28 February 1970; reopening in 2026
- Renovated: 2023
- Expanded: 1980, 1988, 2023
- Closed: 1994

Size
- K–point: 145 m
- Hill size: 469 ft
- Longest jump (unofficial / fall): 159 metres (522 ft) (Austria) Werner Schuster (25 February 1989)
- Hill record: 158 m (518 ft) (Austria) Matthias Wallner (Austria) Werner Schuster (22, 23 January 1994)

Copper Peak is a ski flying hill designed by Lauren Larsen and located near Ironwood, Michigan, United States. It was built in 1969 and inaugurated one year later. The site was listed on the National Register of Historic Places in 1973 and designated a Michigan State Historic Site in 1971. The site is currently used as a summer tourist attraction.

== History ==
=== Copper mining ===
In 1845, the Chippewa Copper Mining Company began mining work here, sinking a tunnel into the granite rock. They produced no copper and eventually closed. Around 1900 the Old Peak Company made further explorations, with no production. The 1845 tunnel is still visible.

=== 1969: Built ===
It all started in 1968 when a delegation from Gogebic Range Ski Club from Ironwood, Michigan came to visit civil/structural engineer Lauren Larsen in Duluth, Minnesota.

=== 1970: Inaugurated ===
Built in 1970, Copper Peak remains the only ski flying facility in the Western Hemisphere. In 1994 a K-point on Copper Peak was at 145 meters (476 ft), allowing jumps up to 158 meters (518 ft). There have been no flights at Copper Peak since 1994. An exhibition tournament was announced for 2014 but was canceled.

Between 1970 and 1994 there were ten competitions sanctioned by FIS and additional two international events were held. The hill record is 158 meters (518 ft), set by Matthias Wallner and Werner Schuster (both Austria) on 22 and 23 January 1994, respectively. The hill was expanded in the 1980s, but the profile is still outdated compared to current standards.

=== Renovation ===
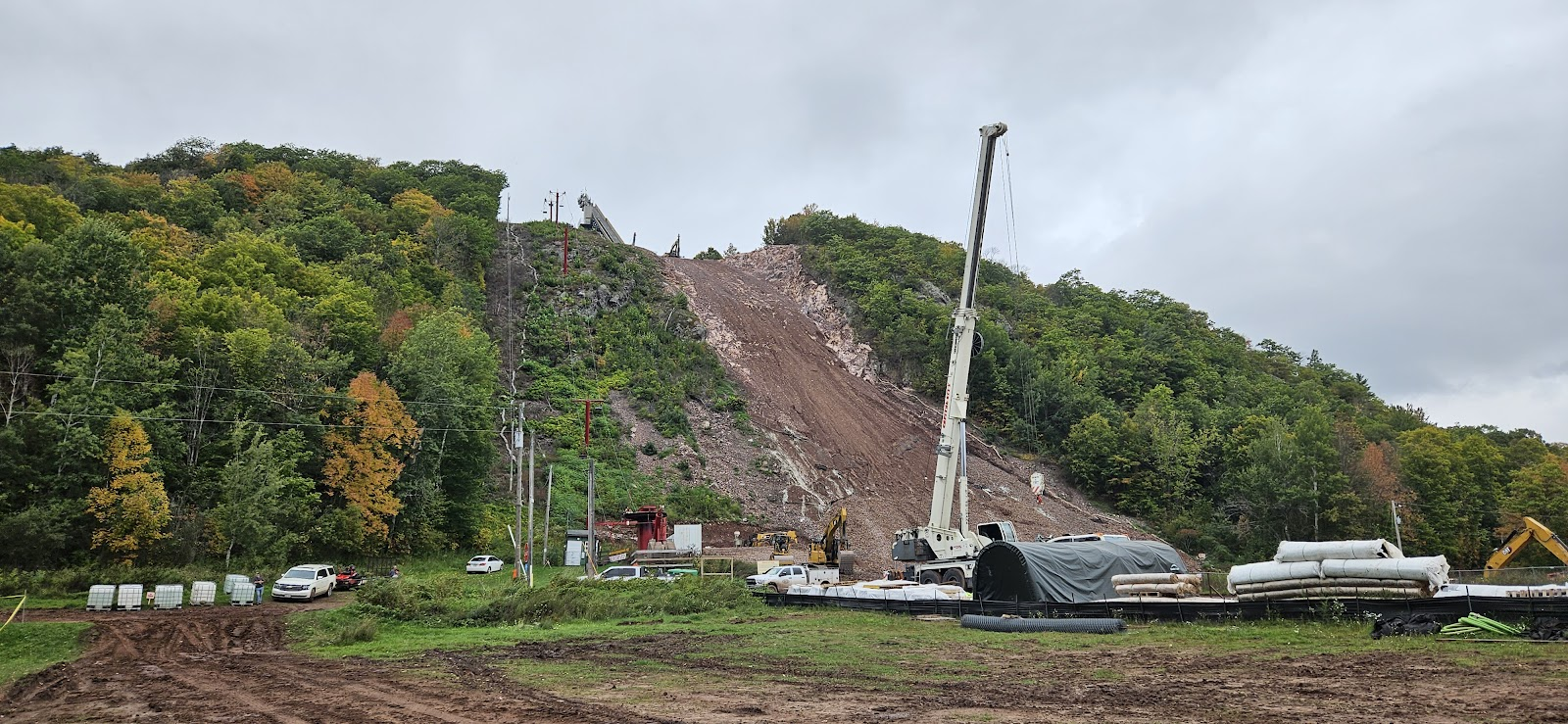
Renovation on the ski jump at Copper Peak, September 2025.

Copper Peak, Inc., established the Copper Peak Organizing Committee for the purposes of raising funds to renovate the ski flying facility for FIS competition. Some improvements to the facilities were made in 2012.

On 14 July 2015 International Ski Federation announced "Copper Peak shall be reactivated" after an inspection of the facility by FIS Race Director Walter Hofer and Hans-Martin Renn who is the chairman of the FIS subcommittee for ski jumping hills. In October 2015, FIS awarded Copper Peak a Grand Prix Summer Series finale event held in September 2017 and a Summer Continental Cup and a Nordic Combined summer event in 2018. These events were not held due to the modifications unable to be completed.

On 30 March 2022, the State of Michigan granted Copper Peak $20 Million for the re-introduction of international ski jumping events at Copper Peak. As of May 2025, reconstruction of the landing hill has begun and is the construction of the concrete ski jump landing hill and outrun is scheduled to be complete in December 2026. Barr Engineering Co. of Duluth and Minneapolis, Minnesota, designed the landing hill renovations; the construction work is being performed by Engineering & Construction Innovations Inc., and Dykon Blasting. Currently, Copper Peak is open on Sundays during the summer and fall to see the construction progress.

== Events ==
Date	Competition	Winner	Second	Third
28 February – 1 March 1970	KOP	(Czechoslovakia) Jiří Raška	(Czechoslovakia) Zbyněk Hubač	(Czechoslovakia) Rudolf Doubek
3–4 February 1973	KOP	(United States) Jerry Martin	(United States) Tom Dargay	(Japan) Minoru Wakasa
2–3 February 1974	KOP	(United States) Ron Steele	(United States) Jerry Martin	(Norway) Petter Kongsli
7–9 February 1975	KOP	(United States) Jerry Martin	(United States) Jim Maki	(Japan) Shunichi Akimoto
29 February 1976	KOP	(East Germany) Hans-Georg Aschenbach	(Austria) Hans Millonig	(East Germany) Bernd Eckstein
2–5 March 1978	KOP	(East Germany) Henry Glaß	(East Germany) Jochen Danneberg	(Austria) Claus Tuchscherer
13 February 1981	WC	(Austria) Alois Lipburger	(Austria) Andreas Felder	(United States) John Broman
14 February 1981	WC	(Austria) Alois Lipburger	(Austria) Andreas Felder	(Austria) Fritz Koch
15 February 1981	WC	strong wind		
25 February 1989	INT	(Austria) Franz Wiegele	(Austria) Werner Schuster	(Austria) Wolfgang Margreiter
3–4 March 1990	INT	(Czechoslovakia) Stanislav Vasko	(Austria) Stefan Horngacher	(Austria) Franz Wiegele
22 January 1994	COC	(Norway) Terje Nyhus	(Austria) Werner Schuster	(Austria) Matthias Wallner
23 January 1994	COC	(Austria) Matthias Wallner	(Austria) Werner Schuster	(Norway) Frode Håre

=== Hill records ===
Date		Length
27 February 1970	(United States) Greg Swor	78 m (255 ft)
1 March 1970	(Czechoslovakia) Zbyněk Hubač	134 m (440 ft)
3–4 February 1973	(Japan) Akitsugu Konno	136 m (446 ft)
3–4 February 1973	(United States) Jerry Martin	137 m (449 ft)
3–4 February 1973	(Japan) Akitsugu Konno	138 m (453 ft)
2–3 February 1974	(United States) Tom Dargay	144 m (472 ft)
2–3 February 1974	(United States) Jerry Martin	144 m (472 ft)
7–9 February 1975	(United States) Jerry Martin	147 m (482 ft)
29 February 1976	(East Germany) Hans-Georg Aschenbach	154 m (505 ft)
13 February 1981	(Austria) Alois Lipburger	154 m (505 ft)
3–4 February 1990	(Czechoslovakia) Stanislav Vasko	156 m (512 ft)
22 January 1994	(Austria) Mathias Wallner	158 m (518 ft)
23 January 1994	(Austria) Werner Schuster	158 m (518 ft)

- W. Schuster crashed at 159 m (522 ft) at event on 25 February 1989.

== Chippewa Hill ==
The peak, also known as Chippewa Hill, is a felsite hill about three hundred feet in height. The hill slopes steeply to the north and south, and there is a steep bluff on the east side of the hill. The Copper Peak ski-slide and tower dominates the peak of the hill. The tower sits on concrete footings based in solid rock. An 1845 tunnel and several copper excavation pits are visible on the hill, and are not affected by the construction of the ski-slide.

== Mining ==
The hill, also known as Chippewa Hill and Old Peak, was the site of a mine owned by the Chippewa Copper Mining Company. Work began in 1845, but no copper was produced.

== See also ==
Two other ski jumps located in the Upper Peninsula of Michigan:

- Pine Mountain Ski Jump – one of the highest artificially created ski jumps in the world, located near Iron Mountain, Michigan
- Suicide Hill Ski Jump – located near Ishpeming, Michigan and the National Ski Hall of Fame
