= Lestander =

Lestander is a Swedish surname.

== Geographical distribution ==
As of 2014, 90.7% of all known bearers of the surname Lestander were residents of Sweden, 4.2% of Canada, 2.6% of Norway and 1.0% of the United States.

In Sweden, the frequency of the surname was higher than national average (1:26,541) in the following counties:

1. Norrbotten (1:1,363)
2. Västerbotten (1:3,832)

== People ==
- Klas Lestander (1931–2023), Swedish biathlete
- Ove Lestander (born 1941), Swedish cross country skier
- Paul Lestander (1926–2012), Swedish politician
