= Galina Pilyushenko =

Medal record

Women's cross-country skiing

Representing Soviet Union

World Championships
Silver medal – second place	1970 Vysoké Tatry	5 km

Galina Pilyushenko (Russian: Галина Пилюшенко) is a former Soviet cross-country skier who competed in the late 1960s and early 1970s. She won a silver medal in the 5 km at the 1970 FIS Nordic World Ski Championships in Vysoké Tatry and finished sixth in the 10 km event at those same championships.

== Cross-country skiing results ==
All results are sourced from the International Ski Federation (FIS).

=== World Championships ===
- 1 medal – (1 silver)

Year	Age	5 km	10 km	3 × 5 km relay
1970	24	Silver	6	—
