= Sergey Yanin =

Soviet ski jumper

Personal information
- Nationality: Soviet
- Born: 14 October 1953 (age 72) Sverdlovsk, Russian SFSR, Soviet Union

Sport
- Sport: Ski jumping

Sergey Yanin (born 14 October 1953) is a Soviet ski jumper. He competed in the large hill event at the 1972 Winter Olympics.
