= Ingvar Sandström =

Swedish cross-country skier

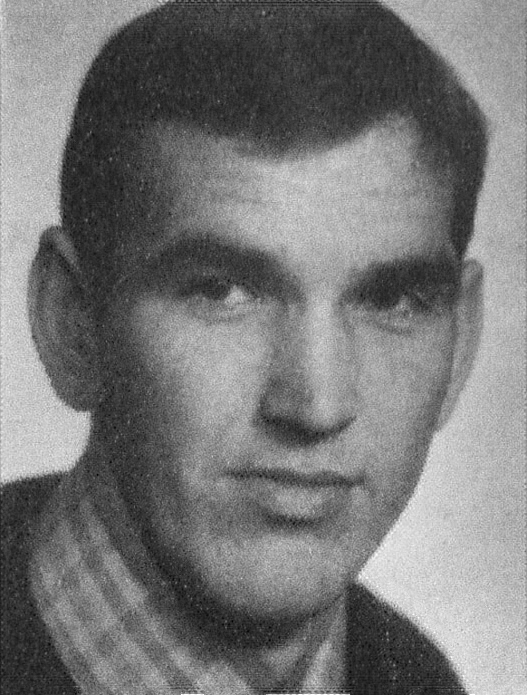

Personal information
- Born: 3 September 1942 (age 84) Lycksele, Sweden

Sport
- Sport: Cross-country skiing
- Club: Lycksele IF
Medal record
Representing Sweden
World Championships
Bronze medal – third place	1970 Vysoké Tatry	4 × 10 km relay

Ingvar Sandström (born 3 September 1942) is a Swedish cross-country skier who competed in the late 1960s and early 1970s. He won the 4 × 10 km relay bronze at the 1970 FIS Nordic World Ski Championships in Vysoké Tatry.

Sandström also finished fourth in the 30 km event at the 1966 FIS Nordic World Ski Championships in Oslo and competed in the 30 km event at the 1968 Winter Olympics. At the 1972 Winter Olympics he was a reserve member of the Swedish team.

== Cross-country skiing results ==
All results are sourced from the International Ski Federation.

=== Olympic Games ===
Year	Age	15 km	30 km	50 km	4 × 10 km relay
1968	25	—	21	—	—

=== World Championships ===
- 1 medal – (1 bronze)

Year	Age	15 km	30 km	50 km	4 × 10 km relay
1966	23	10	4	—	4
1970	27	—	—	—	Bronze
