= Carl-Erik Eriksson =

Swedish bobsledder (1930–2023)

Personal information
- Born: 20 May 1930; Stockholm, Sweden
- Died: 31 July 2023 (aged 93); Ekerö, Sweden

Sport
- Country: Sweden
- Sport: bobsleigh

Achievements and titles
- Olympic finals: 6th in two-man sled (1972); 9th in two-man sled (1976)

Carl-Erik Mauritz "Jätten" Eriksson (20 May 1930 – 31 July 2023) was a Swedish bobsledder who was the first person to compete in bobsleigh at six Olympic Games, from 1964 to 1984.

== Biography ==
Born in Stockholm, Eriksson was flag-bearer for Sweden at the 1976 Winter Olympics in Innsbruck. In the bobsled two-man sled, Eriksson came sixth (with Jan Johansson) at the 1972 Winter Olympics and ninth (with Kenth Rönn) at the 1976 Winter Olympics.

The only other bobsledder to compete at six Olympics is Italian Gerda Weissensteiner, although only two of her six appearances were in bobsleigh (the other four were luge).

Eriksson represented BK Sankt Erik and Djurgårdens IF.

Carl-Erik Eriksson died in Ekerö on 31 July 2023, at the age of 93.

== See also ==
- List of athletes with the most appearances at Olympic Games
