= Einar Bergsland =

Norwegian Nordic skier (1909–1982)

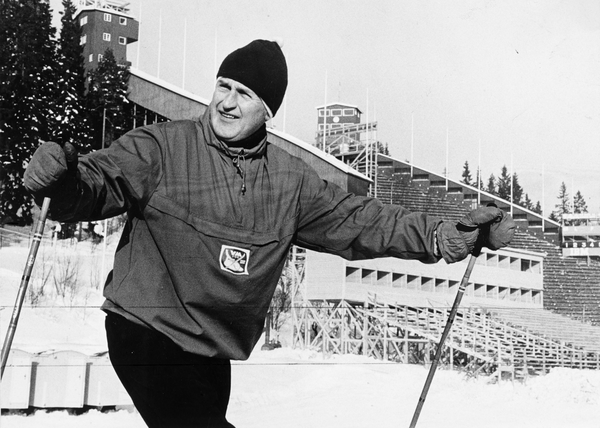
Einar Bergsland

Einar Bergsland (11 December 1909 – 12 July 1982) was a Norwegian Nordic skier who later became a promoter for the Holmenkollen ski festival, for alpine skiing in Norway, and for the FIS.

As a Nordic skier, Bergsland once beat the legendary Johan Grøttumsbråten in competition. He also was national champion in rowing, golf, and dogsled racing. Later, Bergsland introduced alpine skiing to Norway, and was involved on the Holmenkollen organizing committee for 35 years, including 14 as president. From 1945 to 1951, he was Secretary-General of the International Ski Federation (FIS), later serving on the Council until 1969. Bergsland was also President of the Commission from 1951 to 1953 and served as an honorary member of the (FIS) until his 1982 death.

He also wrote many skiing books, including one about the 1952 Winter Olympics in Oslo (1951).

For his lengthy and diverse service in skiing, Bergsland received the Holmenkollen medal in 1973 (shared with Ingolf Mork and Franz Keller).

Sporting positions
Preceded by Carl Chr. Lange	Chair of the Association for the Promotion of Skiing; 1958–1962	Succeeded by Kristian Arnesen
