= Nikolay Nogovitsyn =

Medal record

Men's Nordic combined

World Championships
Silver medal – second place	1970 Vysoké Tatry	Individual

Nikolay Germanovich Nogovitsyn (Russian: Никола́й Германович Ногови́цын) (born 7 January 1948 in Prokopievsk) is a former Soviet Nordic combined skier who competed during the 1970s. He won a silver medal in the individual event at the 1970 FIS Nordic World Ski Championships in Vysoké Tatry.

Nogovitsyn also finished 6th in the individual event at the 1976 Winter Olympics in Innsbruck.
