= IL Hjelset-Fram =

Norwegian sports club

Hjelset-Fram
- Full name: Idrettslaget Hjelset-Fram
- Founded: 10 February 1907

Idrettslaget Hjelset-Fram is a Norwegian sports club from Hjelset in Molde Municipality. It has sections for table tennis and Nordic skiing (cross-country skiing and ski jumping).

It was founded on 10 February 1907. The club is best known for its ski jumpers, which include Olympians Ingolf Mork and Jan Olaf Roaldset and Hans Jørgen Næss. Around 1970 Hjelset-Fram was sometimes called "the world's best ski jumping team".

In 1995, the football section merged with the similar section in Kleive IL from nearby Kleive to form the club Hjelset-Kleive Fotball.
