= Alois Lipburger =

Austrian ski jumper (1956–2001)

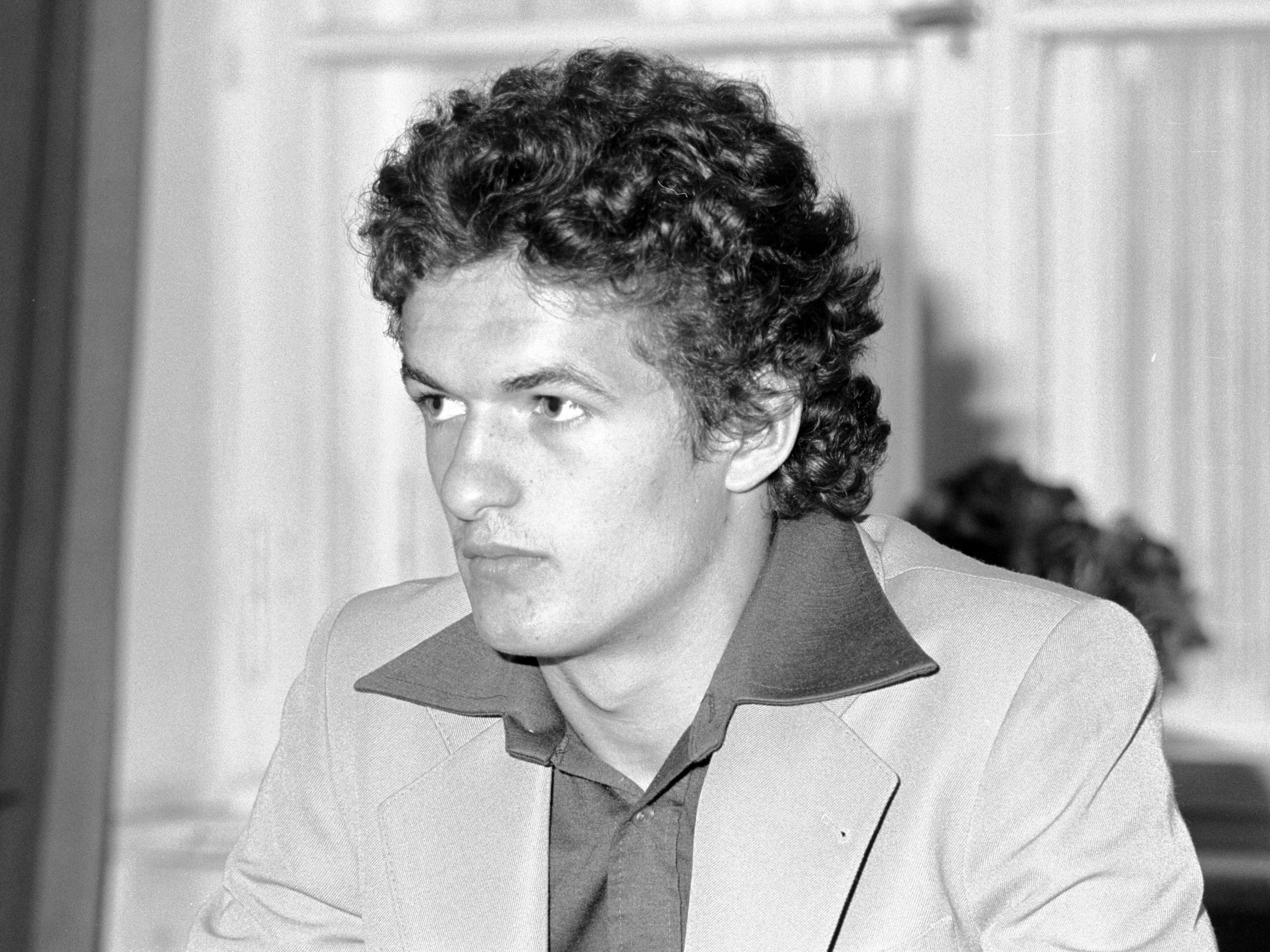

Personal information
- Nationality: Austria
- Born: 27 August 1956 Andelsbuch, Austria
- Died: 4 February 2001 (aged 44) Füssen, Germany

Sport
- Sport: Skiing

World Cup career
- Seasons: 1980–1981
- Indiv. starts: 21
- Indiv. podiums: 3
- Indiv. wins: 2
Medal record
Men's ski jumping
Representing Austria
FIS Nordic World Ski Championships
Silver medal – second place	1978 Lahti	Individual LHl
- Updated on 10 February 2016

Alois Lipburger (27 August 1956 – 4 February 2001) was an Austrian ski jumper.

== Career ==
He won a silver medal in the individual large hill competition at the 1978 FIS Nordic World Ski Championships in Lahti. Lipburger's only two individual world cup wins came in a ski flying competition in the United States in 1981. After his career, he worked as a ski jumping coach. However, he died in an automobile accident while returning from a World Cup event in Willingen in 2001.

== World Cup ==
=== Standings ===
Season	Overall	4H
1979/80	17	28
1980/81	11	75

=== Wins ===
No.	Season	Date	Location	Hill	Size
1	1980/81	13 February 1981	(United States) Ironwood	Copper Peak K145	FH
2	1980/81	14 February 1981	(United States) Ironwood	Copper Peak K145	FH
