= Topi Mattila =

Finnish ski jumper (born 1946)

Topi Mattila (born 29 March 1946 in Helsinki) is a Finnish former ski jumper who competed from 1964 to 1969. He finished fifth in the individual normal hill event at the 1968 Winter Olympics in Grenoble, which was Mattila's best career finish as well.
