= Ove Lestander =

Swedish cross-country skier

Medal record

Men's cross-country skiing

Representing Sweden

World Championships
Bronze medal – third place	1970 Vysoké Tatry	4 × 10 km relay

Ove Lestander (born 23 July 1940) was a former Swedish cross-country skiing who scored international successes in the late 1960s and early 1970s. He earned a bronze medal in the 4 × 10 km relay at the 1970 FIS Nordic World Ski Championships in Vysoké Tatry.

== Cross-country skiing results ==
=== World Championships ===
- 1 medal – (1 bronze)

Year	Age	15 km	30 km	50 km	4 × 10 km relay
1970	28	—	—	—	Bronze
