= Anders Lundqvist =

Swedish ski jumper

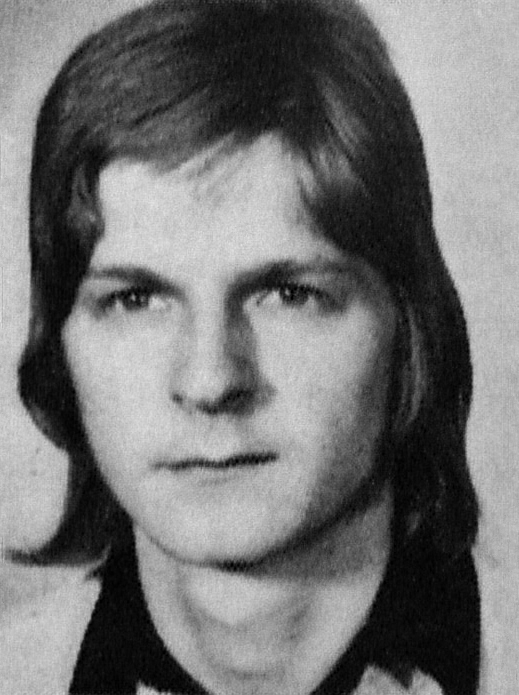

Personal information
- Nationality: Swedish
- Born: 8 March 1951 (age 75) Örnsköldsvik, Sweden

Sport
- Sport: Ski jumping
- Club: IF Friska Viljor

Achievements and titles
- Olympic finals: 1972 Winter Olympics

Anders Lundqvist (born 8 March 1951) is a Swedish ski jumper. He placed 41st–42nd in the normal hill and large hill events at the 1972 Winter Olympics.
