= Tord Backman =

Swedish cross-country skier

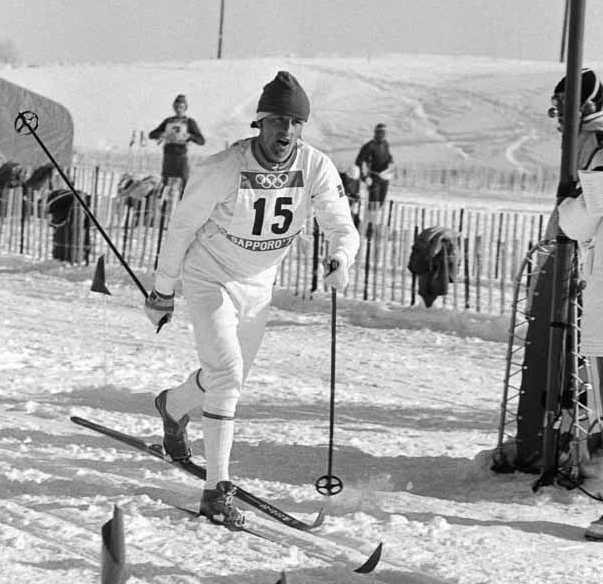
- Backman at the 1972 Olympics

Personal information
- Nationality: Swedish
- Born: 13 November 1942 (age 82); Pålkem, Gällivare, Sweden

Sport
- Sport: Cross-country skiing
- Club: Bergnäsets AIK

Tord Backman (born 13 November 1942) is a Swedish cross-country skier. He was part of the Swedish reserve team at the 1968 Winter Olympics. At the 1972 Games he placed 13th in the 50 km and 20th in the 15 km event.
