= Birgitta Lindqvist =

Swedish skier

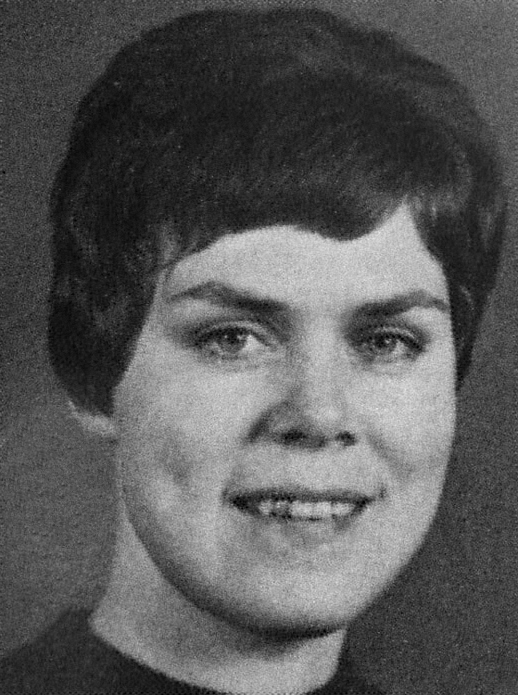

Personal information
- Nationality: Swedish
- Born: 24 July 1942 Stugun, Sweden
- Died: 24 February 2010 (aged 67) Stugun, Sweden

Sport
- Sport: Cross-country skiing
- Club: Offerdals SK

Birgitta Lindqvist, later Vickström (24 July 1942 – 24 February 2010) was a Swedish cross-country skier. She competed in three events at the 1972 Winter Olympics.

== Cross-country skiing results ==
=== Olympic Games ===
Year	Age	5 km	10 km	3 × 5 km relay
1972	29	32	28	8
