= Jan Bieniek =

Polish ski jumper

Personal information
- Born: 1947 (age 77–78)

Sport
- Sport: Skiing
- Club: LKS Skrzyczne Szczyrk (?–1968, 1970–1971, 1973–1974, 1977); WKS Zakopane (1969–1970); LKS Klimczok Bystra (1972, 1975–1976)

Jan Bieniek (born 1947) is a Polish former ski jumper, silver medalist at the 1969 Polish Championships on the normal hill, and a national team representative at two Four Hills Tournaments. He was a reserve athlete at the 1970 World Championships and won a silver medal at the 1970 Silesian Championships. Hailing from Szczyrk, he represented clubs including LKS Skrzyczne and later worked as a coach at Szczyrk's Primary School No. 1 (Winter Sports School).

== Career ==
=== Junior years ===
In 1958, Bieniek placed 26th at the Polish Junior Championships (Category A) in Wisła. Three years later, in 1961, he finished 54th in the same competition in Zakopane. In 1962, he achieved 22nd place at the Silesian Junior Championships. That December, he secured sixth place in Wisła's season-opening junior competition. In 1963, he placed 16th at the Polish Junior Championships in Zakopane. In 1964, competing in the Junior B category in Rabka-Zdrój, he finished 20th and 23rd. That December, at Zakopane's season-closing event, he earned third place in the Junior B category with jumps of 42 m and 45 m. At the 1965 Polish Junior Championships, he placed 24th and 14th. In 1966, he finished 17th in a senior classification event in Szczyrk and seventh in Zakopane. In the Beskid Cup, he placed 19th in Szczyrk and 58th in Wisła.

=== 1967–1968 ===
On 5 March 1967, representing LKS Skrzyczne Szczyrk, Bieniek placed sixth at the 1967 Polish Championships on Wielka Krokiew, achieving two jumps of 92.5 m. In 1968, held in Silesia, he finished 18th on the normal hill and 14th on the large hill. He also secured seventh place at the Beskid Cup in Szczyrk.

In March 1968, he competed internationally in Lahti, finishing 65th.

=== 1968–1969 ===
The 1968–1969 season was Bieniek's most successful in domestic competitions, representing WKS Zakopane. On 5 January 1969, he earned third place at Zakopane's Open Classification Competition celebrating the 50th anniversary of the Polish Ski Federation, with jumps of 64.5 m and 65.5 m, behind Józef Gąsienica-Daniel and Erwin Fiedor. A week later, he placed fifth in a similar event. In the Beskid Cup, he finished 20th in Szczyrk (with two 69 m jumps) and 23rd in Wisła. At the Friendship Cup in Zakopane, he placed 18th. On 15 February, at the 1969 Polish Championships in Zakopane, he won a silver medal on the normal hill with two 67.5 m jumps, trailing Józef Przybyła by 5.9 points. The next day, on Wielka Krokiew, he placed 12th with jumps of 96 m and 95.5 m.

In early March, at the Bronisław Czech and Helena Marusarzówna Memorial, Bieniek finished 39th and 10th. On 23 March, he placed fifth at the Tatra Regional Ski Federation Championships in Zakopane. In April, he finished fourth in a senior classification event in Zakopane.

=== 1969–1970 ===
In October 1969, Bieniek took second place in a national test competition in Szczyrk, trailing only Józef Przybyła. In December, before the 18th Four Hills Tournament, he placed 17th in a classification event in Zakopane. At the tournament, he struggled, finishing 74th in Oberstdorf, 66th in Garmisch-Partenkirchen, and 87th in Innsbruck. He did not compete in Bischofshofen, finishing 85th overall.

Two days after the tournament, he placed 21st in the Beskid Cup in Zakopane. On 4 February, at the 1970 Polish Championships, he finished fifth on Średnia Krokiew with jumps of 65.5 m and 67 m. On 8 March, he placed 13th on the large hill. The previous day, he won silver at the Silesian Championships in Wisła with jumps of 82 m and 81.5 m, finishing behind Stanisław Gąsienica Daniel. Bieniek was selected for Poland's team at the 1970 World Championships in Štrbské Pleso, but remained a reserve, not competing.

=== 1970–1971 ===
In the 1970–1971 season, Bieniek returned to LKS Skrzyczne Szczyrk. On 26 December, he placed 7th in Zakopane's Television Cup. At the 19th Four Hills Tournament, he finished 42nd overall, achieving 27th in Oberstdorf (74 m, 78 m), 48th in Garmisch-Partenkirchen, 18th in Innsbruck (88 m, 81 m), and 68th in Bischofshofen.

After the tournament, he won the WKZZ Katowice Cup in Szczyrk with jumps of 78 m and 81.5 m, edging out Józef Kocyan by one point. At the 1971 Polish Championships, he placed 18th on the large hill in Wisła and 21st on the normal hill in Szczyrk.

=== Later seasons ===
At the 1972 Polish Championships in Zakopane, representing LKS Klimczok Bystra, Bieniek finished 15th on the large hill and 20th on the normal hill. In 1973, back with LKS Skrzyczne Szczyrk, he placed 21st and 12th in Silesia. He finished 24th at the Silesian Championships in Wisła and 23rd at the Karkonosze Cup in Szklarska Poręba. In the Beskid Cup, he placed 8th and 18th. At the 1973 Czech and Marusarzówna Memorial, he recorded lower rankings.

In late January 1974, he placed 10th in an open competition in Zakopane. At the 1974 Polish Championships, he finished 7th on the normal hill and 4th on the large hill with jumps of 97.5 m and 95 m, missing the podium by 1.6 points. On 4 March, he won the Karkonosze Cup in Szklarska Poręba with jumps of 66.5 m and 66 m, beating Fortuna by 4.3 points. Six days later, he placed 32nd at the Czech and Marusarzówna Memorial. He also finished 8th at the Tatra Cup in Štrbské Pleso.

In January 1975, at the Beskid Cup in Wisła, he placed 11th and 4th, missing the podium by 0.4 points in the latter. On 5 February, at the 1975 Polish Championships in Szczyrk, representing LKS Klimczok Bystra, he finished 4th on the normal hill with jumps of 77.5 m and 76.5 m, trailing bronze medalist Aleksander Stołowski by 3.6 points. Three days later, he placed 7th on Wielka Krokiew with jumps of 107 m and 109.5 m. He also won silver at the Beskid Championships. In March, he placed 39th at the Zakopane Memorial. In April, he finished 48th in an international competition in Oberwiesenthal.

In 1976, at the 1976 Polish Championships in Zakopane, he placed 7th on Wielka Krokiew with jumps of 95.5 m and 96 m and 9th on the normal hill. He also placed 6th at the Jan Legierski Memorial, 13th at the Friendship Cup in Zakopane, and 20th and 7th in the Beskid Cup in Wisła and Szczyrk, respectively.

In 1977, his final year at the Polish Championships, he finished 18th on the large hill and 42nd on the normal hill, representing LKS Skrzyczne Szczyrk. He also placed 31st in the Beskid Cup in Szczyrk.

== Other achievements ==
- Silver medal at the 1970 Silesian Championships
- Victory at the 5th WKZZ Katowice Cup, 1971

== Bibliography ==
- Więcek, Andrzej (2014). Mistrzostwa Polski w Narciarstwie klasycznym i alpejskim 1920-2013 [Polish Championships in Nordic and Alpine Skiing 1920–2013] (in Polish). Zamość: Atut. ISBN 9788389797544.
