= Ski jumping at the 1968 Winter Olympics =

Ski jumping at the X Olympic Winter Games
- Pictogram for ski jumping
- Venue: Saint-Nizier-du-Moucherotte (large hill) & Autrans (normal hill)
- Dates: 11–18 February 1968
- Competitors: 66 from 17 nations

Ski jumping at the 1968 Winter Olympics consisted of two events held from 11 to 18 February, with the large hill event taking place at Saint-Nizier-du-Moucherotte, and the normal hill event at Autrans.

== Medal summary ==
=== Medal table ===
Rank	Nation	Gold	Silver	Bronze	Total
1	Czechoslovakia	1	1	0	2
2	Soviet Union	1	0	0	1
3	Austria	0	1	1	2
4	Norway	0	0	1	1
Totals (4 entries)		2	2	2	6

Czechoslovakia led the medal table with two, one gold. The gold medal won by Vladimir Belussov in the large hill event was the only medal in ski jumping ever won by the Soviet Union.

=== Events ===
Event	Gold		Silver		Bronze	
Normal hill	Jiří Raška; Czechoslovakia	216.5	Reinhold Bachler; Austria	214.2	Baldur Preiml; Austria	212.6
Large hill	Vladimir Belousov; Soviet Union	231.3	Jiří Raška; Czechoslovakia	229.4	Lars Grini; Norway	214.3

== Participating NOCs ==
Seventeen nations participated in ski jumping at the Grenoble Games.

- Austria (4)
- Canada (3)
- Finland (5)
- France (4)
- West Germany (4)
- East Germany (4)
- Hungary (2)
- Italy (1)
- Japan (5)
- Norway (5)
- Poland (4)
- Switzerland (1)
- Sweden (5)
- Czechoslovakia (5)
- Soviet Union (4)
- United States (5)
- Yugoslavia (5)
