= Lars-Göran Åslund =

Swedish cross-country skier

Medal record

Men's cross-country skiing

Representing Sweden

World Championships
Gold medal – first place	1970 Vysoké Tatry	15 km
Bronze medal – third place	1970 Vysoké Tatry	4 × 10 km relay

Lars-Göran Åslund (born 7 June 1945 in Åsarna) is a former Swedish cross-country skier who competed in the late 1960s and early 1970s. His biggest success was at the 1970 FIS Nordic World Ski Championships in Vysoké Tatry where he won two medals with a gold in the 15 km and a bronze in the 4 × 10 km relay. He also competed at the 1972 Winter Olympics.

== Cross-country skiing results ==
All results are sourced from the International Ski Federation (FIS).

=== Olympic Games ===
Year	Age	15 km	30 km	50 km	4 × 10 km relay
1972	26	18	11	—	4

=== World Championships ===
- 2 medals – (1 gold, 1 bronze)

Year	Age	15 km	30 km	50 km	4 × 10 km relay
1970	24	Gold	6	5	Bronze
1974	28	49	5	15	DNF
