= Franz Keller (skier) =

German Nordic combined skier

Medal record

Men's Nordic combined

Representing West Germany

Olympic Games
Gold medal – first place	1968 Grenoble	Individual

World Championships
Silver medal – second place	1966 Oslo	Individual

Franz Keller (German pronunciation: [fʁant͡s ˈkɛlɐ]; born 19 January 1945) is a West German Nordic combined skier. At the 1968 Winter Olympics in Grenoble, he won the gold medal in the individual event. Keller also won a silver at the 1966 FIS Nordic World Ski Championships in the individual event and won the event at the Holmenkollen ski festival in 1967.

Keller received the Holmenkollen medal in 1973 (shared with Einar Bergsland and Ingolf Mork).

Awards
Preceded by (Germany) Kurt Bendlin	German Sportsman of the Year; 1968	Succeeded by (Germany) Hans Fassnacht
