= Lars Grini =

Norwegian ski jumper

Personal information
- Nationality: Norway
- Born: 29 June 1944 Gran Municipality, Norway
- Height: 182 cm (6 ft 0 in)

Sport
- Sport: Skiing
- Club: SFK Lyn

Achievements and titles
- Personal bests: 150 m (490 ft); Oberstdorf, West Germany (11 February 1967)
Medal record
Men's ski jumping
Olympic Games
| Bronze medal – third place | 1968 Grenoble | Individual LH |
World Championships
| Bronze medal – third place | 1968 Grenoble | Individual LH |
| Bronze medal – third place | 1970 Vysoké Tatry | Individual NH |

Lars Grini (born 29 June 1944) is a Norwegian former ski jumper who competed between 1966 and 1972.

== Career ==
His best-known successes were at the 1968 Winter Olympics in Grenoble, where he won a bronze medal in the individual large hill event, and another bronze medal in the individual normal hill at the 1970 FIS Nordic World Ski Championships. He represented the club SFK Lyn.

On 10 February 1967, he set ski jumping distance world record at 147 metres (482 ft) on Heini-Klopfer-Skiflugschanze in Oberstdorf, West Germany.

On 11 February 1967, the next day, he set another world record at 150 metres (492 ft) also in Oberstdorf.

== Ski jumping world records ==
| Date | Hill | Location | Metres | Feet |
|---|---|---|---|---|
| 10 February 1967 | Heini-Klopfer-Skiflugschanze | Oberstdorf, West Germany | 147 | 482 |
| 11 February 1967 | Heini-Klopfer-Skiflugschanze | Oberstdorf, West Germany | 150 | 492 |
