= Yvan Richard =

French ski jumper

Personal information
- Nationality: French
- Born: 11 December 1950 (age 75)

Sport
- Sport: Ski jumping

Yvan Richard (born 11 December 1950) is a French ski jumper. He competed in the normal hill and large hill events at the 1972 Winter Olympics.
