= Drago Pudgar =

Slovenian ski jumper

Personal information
- Nationality: Slovenian
- Born: 27 September 1949 (age 75); Črna na Koroškem, Yugoslavia

Sport
- Sport: Ski jumping

Drago Pudgar (born 27 September 1949) is a Slovenian ski jumper. He competed in the normal hill and large hill events at the 1972 Winter Olympics.
