= Rolf Nordgren =

Swedish ski jumper

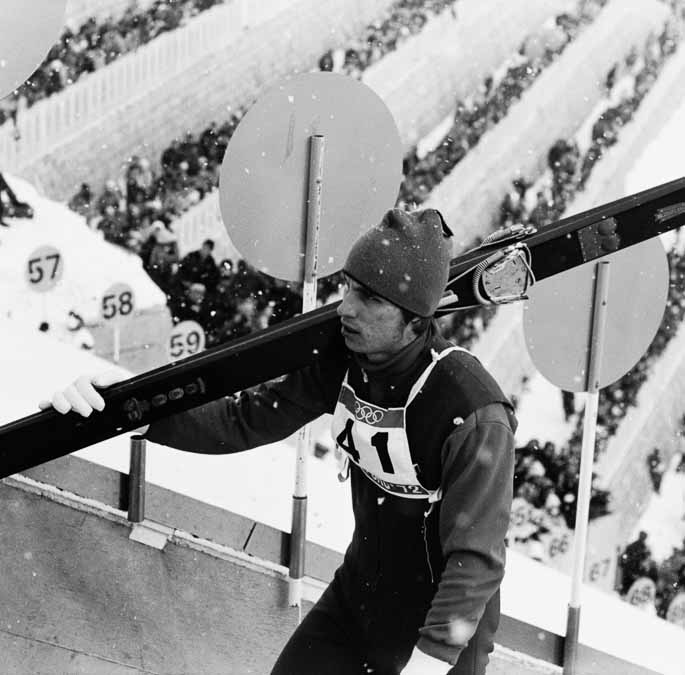
- Nordgren at the 1972 Olympics

Personal information
- Nationality: Swedish
- Born: 8 August 1946 (age 78); Gävle, Sweden

Sport
- Sport: Ski jumping
- Club: Bollnäs GIF

Rolf Nordgren (born 8 August 1946) is a Swedish ski jumper. He finished eleventh in the normal hill and large hill events at the 1972 Winter Olympics.
