= Jan Johansson (bobsleigh) =

Swedish bobsledder (born 1943)

Personal information
- Nationality: Swedish
- Born: 12 September 1943 (age 82) Kalix, Sweden

Sport
- Sport: Bobsleigh

Jan Edvin Johansson (born 12 September 1943) is a Swedish bobsledder. He competed at the 1972 Winter Olympics and the 1976 Winter Olympics.

Johansson represented Djurgårdens IF.
