= Jürgen Dommerich =

East German ski jumper

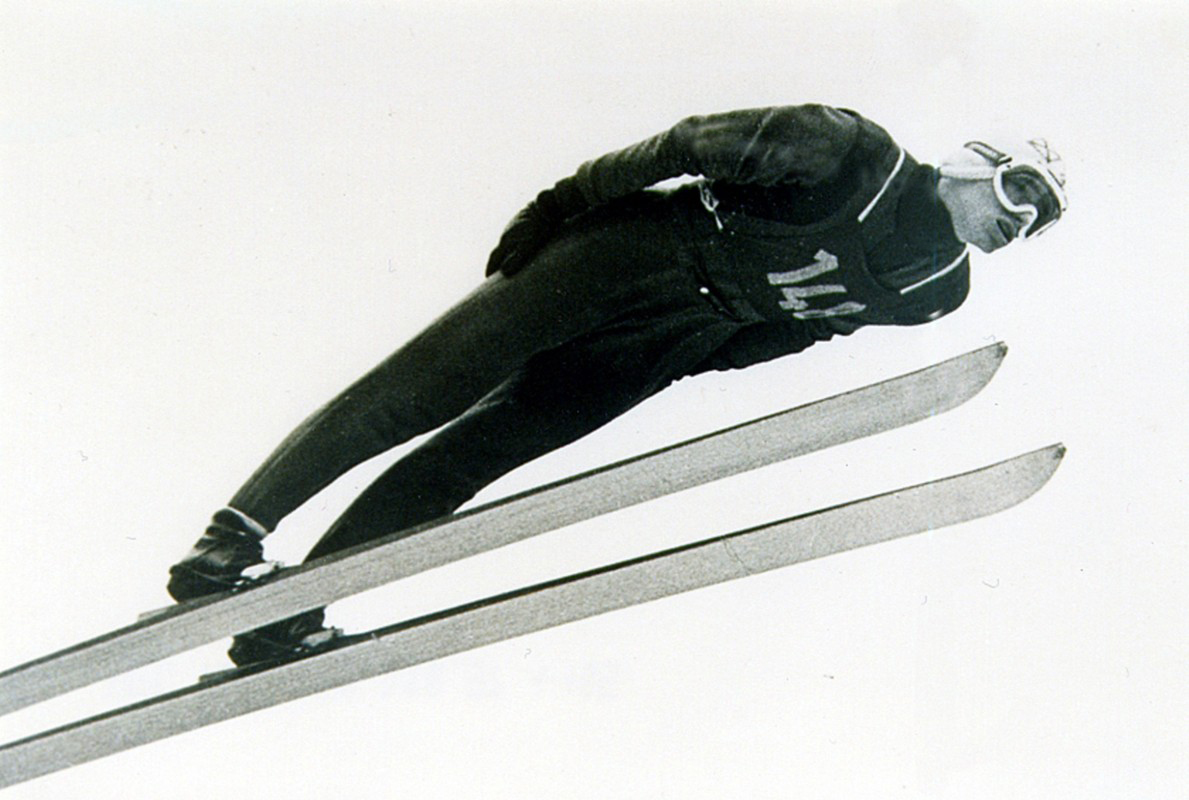

Personal information
- Full name: Jürgen Dommerich

Sport
- Sport: Skiing

Achievements and titles
- Personal bests: 137 m (449 ft); Planica, 21 Mar 1969
- Updated on 30 Mar 2015

Jürgen Dommerich was an East German ski jumper.

== Career ==
He set the first official hill record Letalnica bratov Gorišek in Planica on 21 March 1969 with 137 m (449 ft) long jump. Although Miro Oman from Yugoslavia as first person tested this hill two weeks earlier with 135 m (443 ft) long jump. After active career he worked as a trainer at WSV Benneckenstein ski jumping club.
