= FIS Nordic World Ski Championships 1970 =

International Nordic skiing competition

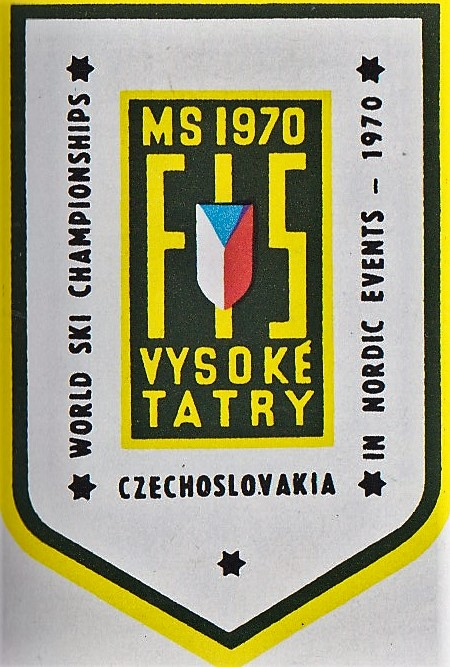
- Host city: Vysoké Tatry
- Country: Czechoslovakia
- Events: 10
- Opening: 14 February 1970
- Closing: 22 February 1970

The FIS Nordic World Ski Championships 1970 took place on 14–22 February 1970 in Vysoké Tatry, Czechoslovakia (present-day Slovakia). This was the second time this city hosted the event having done so in 1935. It was the first time an event was televised in colour from Czechoslovakia though broadcasting there remained in black and white. This was the first championships that timed the results in hundredths of a second, a practice that continued until the 1980 Winter Olympics in Lake Placid when Sweden's Thomas Wassberg edged out Finland's Juha Mieto by 0.01 seconds in the men's 15 km event.

== Men's cross-country ==
=== 15 km ===
17 February 1970

Medal	Athlete	Time
Gold	Lars-Göran Åslund (SWE)	47:04.71
Silver	Odd Martinsen (NOR)	47:38.19
Bronze	Fyodor Simashev (URS)	47:49.00

=== 30 km ===
16 February 1970

Medal	Athlete	Time
Gold	Vyacheslav Vedenin (URS)	1:39:48.01
Silver	Gerhard Grimmer (GDR)	1:40:25.58
Bronze	Odd Martinsen (NOR)	1:41:04.42

=== 50 km ===
20 February 1970

Medal	Athlete	Time
Gold	Kalevi Oikarainen (FIN)	2:49:34.70
Silver	Vyacheslav Vedenin (URS)	2:50:04.82
Bronze	Gerhard Grimmer (GDR)	2:50:12.88

=== 4 × 10 km relay ===
22 February 1970

Medal	Team	Time
Gold	Soviet Union (Vladimir Voronkov, Valery Tarakanov, Fyodor Simashev, Vyacheslav Vedenin)	2:06:36.47
Silver	East Germany (Gerd Hessler, Axel Lesser, Gerhard Grimmer, Gert-Dietmar Klause)	2:06:50.59
Bronze	Sweden (Ove Lestander, Jan Halvarsson, Ingvar Sandström, Lars-Göran Åslund)	2:06:56.80

== Women's cross-country ==
=== 5 km ===
17 February 1970

Medal	Athlete	Time
Gold	Galina Kulakova (URS)	18:07.89
Silver	Galina Pilyushenko (URS)	18:27.91
Bronze	Nina Fyodorova (URS)	18:28.51

=== 10 km ===
16 February 1970

Medal	Athlete	Time
Gold	Alevtina Olyunina (URS)	36:19.00
Silver	Marjatta Kajosmaa (FIN)	36:40.05
Bronze	Galina Kulakova (URS)	37:06.04

=== 3 × 5 km relay ===
22 February 1970

Medal	Team	Time
Gold	Soviet Union (Nina Fyodorova, Galina Kulakova, Alevtina Olyunina)	54:32.18
Silver	East Germany (Gabriele Haupt, Renate Fischer, Anna Unger)	55:09.65
Bronze	Finland (Senja Pusula, Helena Takalo, Marjatta Kajosmaa)	55:33.76

== Men's Nordic combined ==
=== Individual ===
15/16 February 1970

Medal	Athlete	Points
Gold	Ladislav Rygl (TCH)	
Silver	Nikolay Nogovitsyn (URS)	
Bronze	Vyacheslav Dryagin (URS)	

== Men's ski jumping ==
=== Individual normal hill ===
14 February 1970

Medal	Athlete	Points
Gold	Gariy Napalkov (URS)	240.6
Silver	Yukio Kasaya (JPN)	237.7
Bronze	Lars Grini (NOR)	234.6

=== Individual large hill ===
21 February 1970

Medal	Athlete	Points
Gold	Gariy Napalkov (URS)	226.0
Silver	Jiří Raška (TCH)	212.3
Bronze	Stanisław Gąsienica Daniel (POL)	211.8

== Medal table ==
Rank	Nation	Gold	Silver	Bronze	Total
1	Soviet Union (URS)	7	3	4	14
2	Finland (FIN)	1	1	1	3
3	Czechoslovakia (TCH)	1	1	0	2
4	Sweden (SWE)	1	0	1	2
5	East Germany (GDR)	0	3	1	4
6	Norway (NOR)	0	1	2	3
7	Japan (JPN)	0	1	0	1
8	Poland (POL)	0	0	1	1
Totals (8 entries)		10	10	10	30
