= Horst Queck =

East German ski jumper (1943–2025)

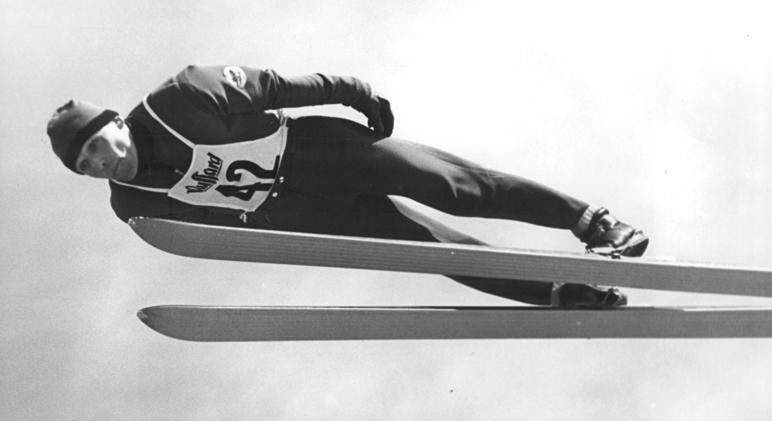
Horst Queck

Horst Queck (5 October 1943 – 20 September 2025) was an East German ski jumper who competed from 1966 to 1971.

Queck was born in Steinach, Gau Thuringia on 5 October 1943. His individual finish was second in the individual normal hill event in Austria in 1970. He was unrelated to the Olympic ski jumper Manfred Queck. Queck died on 20 September 2025, at the age of 81.

== Sources ==
- Horst Queck at the International Ski and Snowboard Federation
