= Scott Berry (ski jumper) =

American ski jumper

Scott Berry (born December 23, 1948, in Deadwood, South Dakota) is an American former ski jumper who competed in the 1972 Winter Olympics.
