= Bill Bakke =

American ski jumper

William Helmer Bakke (born November 20, 1946, in Menomonie, Wisconsin) is an American former ski jumper who competed in the 1968 Winter Olympics.
