= Vladimir Belousov (ski jumper) =

Soviet ski jumper (born 1946)

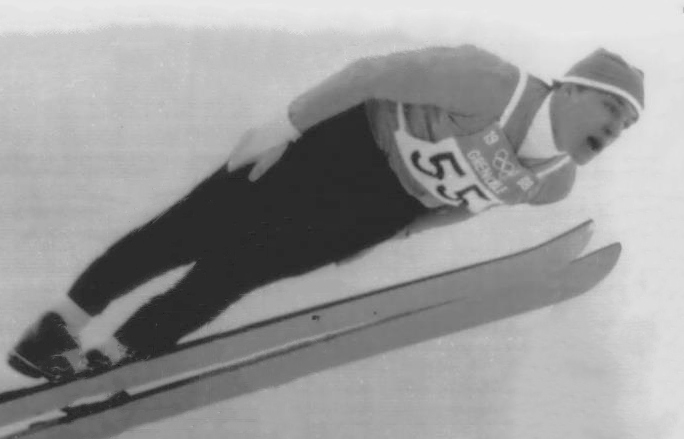
- Belousov in 1968

Personal information
- Born: 14 July 1946 (age 79) Vsevolozhsk, Russian SFSR, Soviet Union
- Height: 173 cm (5 ft 8 in)
- Weight: 78 kg (172 lb)

Sport
- Sport: Ski jumping
- Club: Armed Forces sports society, Leningrad Oblast
Medal record
Representing Soviet Union
Olympic Games
Gold medal – first place	1968 Grenoble	Individual large hill
World Championships
Gold medal – first place	1968 Grenoble	Individual large hill

Vladimir Pavlovich Belousov (Russian: Владимир Павлович Белоусов; born 14 July 1946) is a Soviet former ski jumper. He was the only Soviet ski jumper to medal at the Olympics and is the only person from the Soviet Union or Russia to win a gold medal in ski jumping in both the Winter Olympics and the Holmenkollen. He was awarded the Medal "For Labour Valour" in 1969 and the Order of Friendship in 2011.

Belousov won a gold medal in the individual large hill at the 1968 Olympics, placing eighth in the normal hill. At the Holmenkollen ski festival, he won the ski jumping competition in 1968 and 1970. He became the Honoured Master of Sports of the USSR in 1968 and won the USSR Championship in 1969. In 1978 he graduated from the Military Institute of Physical Culture and later worked as a coach.
