= Jacques Gaillard =

French ski jumper

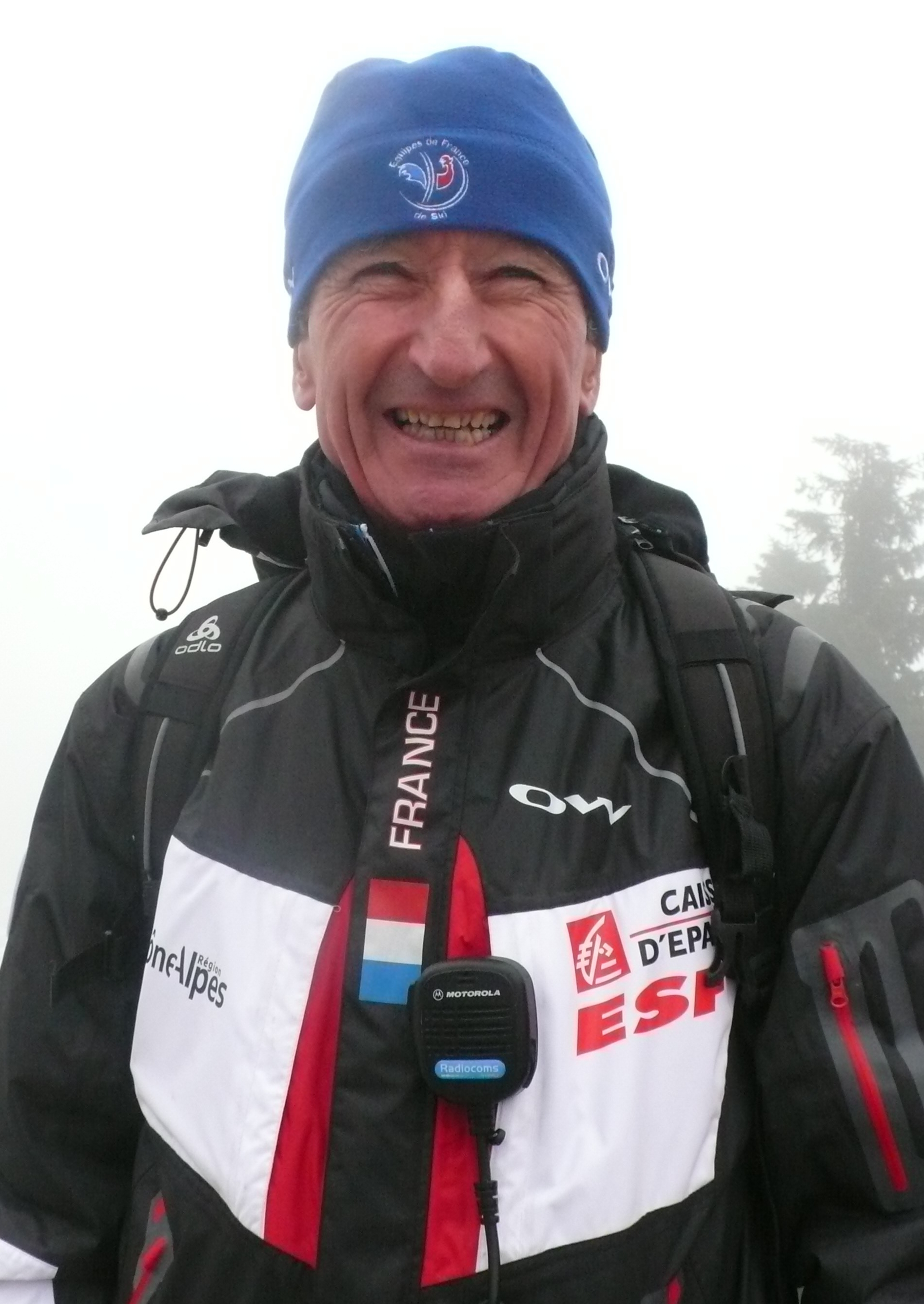
- Jacques Gaillard in 2011

Personal information
- Nationality: French
- Born: 16 August 1950 (age 74)

Sport
- Sport: Ski jumping

Jacques Gaillard (born 16 August 1950) is a French ski jumper. He competed at the 1972 Winter Olympics and the 1976 Winter Olympics.
