= Ulf Kvendbo =

Canadian ski jumper (born 1948)

Ulf Kvendbo (born 11 April 1948 in Stockholm) is a Canadian former ski jumper who competed in the 1968 Winter Olympics and in the 1972 Winter Olympics.
