= Frithjof Prydz =

Norwegian ski jumper and tennis player

- Born: 15 July 1943; Oslo, Norway
- Died: 8 December 1992 (aged 49); Oslo
- Occupations: Ski jumper and tennis player
- Awards: Egebergs Ærespris (1971)

Frithjof Prydz (15 July 1943 – 8 December 1992) was a Norwegian ski jumper and tennis player.

He became Norwegian ski jumping champion in the large hill in 1972, and in the normal hill in 1973. He was Norwegian tennis champion in single in 1968, and won 24 titles in double and mixed double. He was awarded Egebergs Ærespris in 1971. He participated in ski jumping at the 1972 Winter Olympics, where he placed 11th in the normal hill, and 15th in the large hill.

Awards
Preceded by Fred Anton Maier	Egebergs Ærespris; 1971	Succeeded by Bjørn Wirkola
