= Jiří Raška =

Czech ski jumper

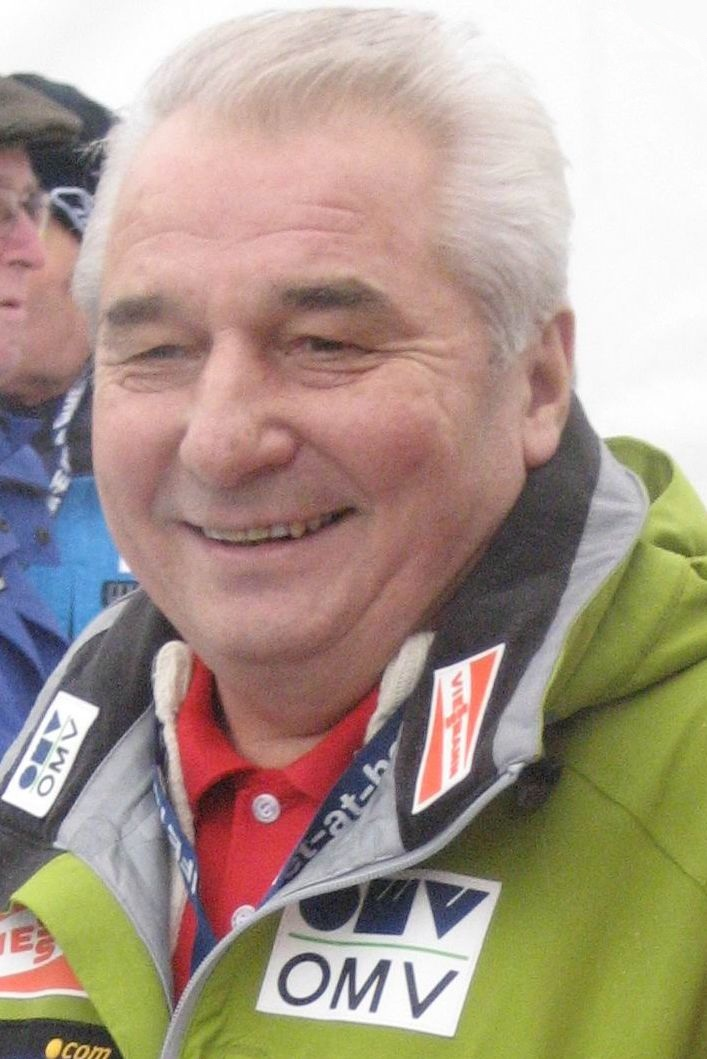
- Raška in 2008

Personal information
- Nationality: Czechoslovakia
- Born: 4 February 1941 Frenštát pod Radhoštěm, Protectorate of Bohemia and Moravia
- Died: 20 January 2012 (aged 70) Nový Jičín, Czech Republic
- Height: 165 cm (5 ft 5 in)

Sport
- Sport: Skiing
- Club: Spartak Frenštát

Achievements and titles
- Personal bests: 164 m (538 ft); Planica, Yugoslavia (22 March 1969)
Medal record
Men's ski jumping
Olympic Games
Gold medal – first place	1968 Grenoble	Individual NH
Silver medal – second place	1968 Grenoble	Individual LH
World Championships
Gold medal – first place	1968 Grenoble	Individual NH
Silver medal – second place	1968 Grenoble	Individual LH
Silver medal – second place	1970 Vysoké Tatry	Individual LH
Men's ski flying
World Championships
Bronze medal – third place	1972 Planica	Individual

Jiří Raška (Czech pronunciation: [ˈjɪr̝iː ˈraʃka]; 4 February 1941 – 20 January 2012) was a Czech ski jumper who competed for Czechoslovakia. He is regarded as the most famous Czech ski jumper in the 20th century.

== Early life ==
He was born in Frenštát pod Radhoštěm in 1941. His father died of leukaemia when Jiří Raška was nine years old, leaving his mother to raise four children on her own. His interest in winter sports was not surprising. His cousin and uncle, both active jumpers, took him as their disciple. "We were saying that children in Frenštát are born with skis on their feet," Raška said in the interview for Czech newspaper Lidové noviny. Raška was however also active in other sports, like football, cycling and handball.

== Introduction to ski jumping ==
As a young jumper he got into coach Zdeněk Remsa's legendary group, the “Remsa Boys”. When military service on Šumava threatened Raška’s budding career, Remsa arranged his entrance into the military sports club Dukla Liberec. In 1964 he travelled to the Winter Olympic Games in Innsbruck as a substitute. There he watched Josef Matouš, who led after the first round and had an opportunity to become the second Czech individual Winter Olympic medalist, but ended up without a medal. Four years later, Raška was in a similar situation.

== Career successes ==
Thanks to the fourth place in the 1966 FIS Nordic World Ski Championships and a second place in the Four Hills Tournament, he travelled to the 1968 Winter Olympics in Grenoble as one of the favourites. Raška himself was hoping to take the fifth place and would not have been disappointed with the tenth place. Czech writer Ota Pavel described his first jump in the normal hill event: "It was a beautiful flight in the infinite silence, that took short human age. Painter and editor Ota Mašek nearly fainted, photographer Jarda Skála stopped photographing. Coach Remsa was washing his face with snow and squeaking Norwegian Wirkola stopped squeaking." Raška jumped 79 metres, which was less than Austrian Baldur Preiml, but thanks to better style he led after the first round. In the second jump he did not fare well, reaching only 72.5 meters, but he went on to victory. Jiří Raška became the first Czech winner in the Winter Olympics. He added the silver medal in the large hill event, beaten only by Vladimir Beloussov of the Soviet Union.

On 22 March 1969, he set two world records, both at the opening of Velikanka bratov Gorišek in Planica, Yugoslavia. First he tied at 156 metres (512 ft) and then on 164 metres (538 ft), which lasted one day only.

That year he managed to win six races in a row. At the 1970 FIS Nordic World Ski Championships in Vysoké Tatry, over a hundred thousand visitors came to see him jump. He finished second in the large hill event and eighth in the normal hill event.

Raška's other successes included a silver medal at the World Championships in the large hill in 1970, victory in the Four Hills Tournament the year after, bronze in the historically first Ski-flying World Championships, and fifth place in the 1972 Winter Olympics in Sapporo.

In 1974 he became a coach but continued with active jumping. "I decided to end immediately once the first junior beats me," he said to the Czech newspaper Hospodářské noviny. Thus he ended his competition career in 1976 after being defeated by František Novák.

== Coaching career ==
Between 1994 and 1996 he was together with Medal and later on Malec coach of the Czech representation. During the 1990s he was also a coach of the Czech junior representation and vice-chair of the Czech Ski Union. In the Union’s poll he was elected as a Czech skier of the century. He died in 2012 in Nový Jičín.

== Ski jumping world records ==
Date	Hill	Location	Metres	Feet
21 March 1969	Velikanka bratov Gorišek K153	Planica, Yugoslavia	156	512
22 March 1969	Velikanka bratov Gorišek K153	Planica, Yugoslavia	164	538
