= Jo Inge Bjørnebye =

Norwegian ski jumper

Personal information
- Nationality: Norwegian
- Born: 31 October 1946 Våler, Norway
- Died: 24 March 2013 (aged 66)

Sport
- Sport: Ski jumping
- Club: Vaaler IF

Jo Inge Bjørnebye (31 October 1946 – 24 March 2013) was a Norwegian ski jumper, born in Våler, Hedmark. He competed at the 1968 Winter Olympics in Grenoble, where he placed 31st in the normal hill. He competed at the 1972 Winter Olympics in Sapporo, both in the normal and large hill.

His son Stig Inge Bjørnebye was a professional footballer, most notably for Liverpool and the Norwegian national team; his daughter-in-law was handball player Hege Frøseth.
