= Zdenek Mezl =

Canadian ski jumper (born 1948)

Zdenek Mezl (born 13 July 1948 in Prague, Czechoslovakia) is a Canadian former ski jumper who competed in the 1972 Winter Olympics.
