= Tadeusz Pawlusiak =

Polish ski jumper

Personal information
- Nationality: Polish
- Born: 9 August 1946; Wilkowice, Poland
- Died: 16 April 2011 (aged 64); Wilkowice, Poland

Sport
- Sport: Ski jumping

Tadeusz Pawlusiak (9 August 1946 – 16 April 2011) was a Polish ski jumper. He competed at the 1972 Winter Olympics and the 1976 Winter Olympics.
