= Ingolf Mork =

Norwegian ski jumper (1947–2012)

Ingolf Mork (4 June 1947 – 1 February 2012) was a Norwegian ski jumper who was born in Molde, and represented IL Hjelset-Fram and SFK Lyn in Oslo. He won the Four Hills Tournament in 1972, and had two victories in the Holmenkollen (1971 and 1972).

In 1973, Mork received the Holmenkollen medal (shared with Einar Bergsland and Franz Keller).

Mork had his education from the Norwegian School of Sport Sciences. Mork died on 1 February 2012, aged 64.
