= Stanisław Gąsienica Daniel =

Polish ski jumper

Medal record

Men's ski jumping

Representing Poland

World Championships
Bronze medal – third place	1970 Vysoké Tatry	Individual large hill

Stanisław Gąsienica Daniel (born 6 March 1951 in Zakopane) is a Polish former ski jumper who competed during the early 1970s. He won a bronze medal in the individual large hill at the 1970 FIS Nordic World Ski Championships in Vysoké Tatry which was also his best finish in his short career. He also competed for Poland at the 1972 Winter Olympics.
