= Tauno Käyhkö =

Finnish-Canadian former ski jumper (born 1950)

Tauno Olavi Käyhkö (born May 6, 1950 in Rovaniemi) is a Finnish-Canadian former ski jumper who competed from 1970 to 1980. At the 1972 Winter Olympics in Sapporo, he finished fourth in the individual large hill event.

Käyhkö's best finish at the FIS Nordic World Ski Championships was fifth twice in the individual large hill events (1970, 1978). His best career finish was in an individual normal hill event in West Germany in 1972.
