= Greg Swor =

American ski jumper (born 1951)

Greg Swor (born April 19, 1951 in Fargo, North Dakota) is an American former ski jumper who competed in the 1972 Winter Olympics.
