= 1975–76 Four Hills Tournament =

24th edition of the annual Four Hills Tournament

Four Hills Tournament
- Venues: Schattenbergschanze, Bergiselschanze, Große Olympiaschanze, Paul-Ausserleitner-Schanze
- Location: West Germany, Austria
- Dates: 30 December 1975 – 6 January 1976
- Competitors: 96 from 15 nations

Medalists
gold medal	(East Germany) Jochen Danneberg
silver medal	(Austria) Karl Schnabl
bronze medal	(Austria) Reinhold Bachler

The 24th edition of the annual Four Hills Tournament was won by East German Jochen Danneberg.

For the tenth time, three out of the four events were won by the same athlete. However, for the fourth time within six years, it was not enough to win the Tournament: Toni Innauer only placed 24th in Innsbruck and lost too much ground to his competitors.

== Participating nations and athletes ==
Nation	Number of Athletes	Athletes
West Germany	6	Alfred Grosche, Peter Leitner, Frank Rombach, Sepp Schwinghammer, Rudi Tusch, Albert Wursthorn
Austria	10	Reinhold Bachler, Rupert Gürtler, Walter Habersatter jr., Toni Innauer, Hans Millonig, Willi Pürstl, Karl Schnabl, Walter Schwabl, Hans Wallner, Rudolf Wanner
Bulgaria	4	Valentin Bozhkov, Peter Dimitrov, Ivan Iankov, Zdravko Idravkov
Canada	6	Kim Fripp, Donald Grady, Richard Grady, Richard Graves, Paul Martin, Peter Wilson
Czechoslovakia	6	Jaroslav Balcar, Jindřich Balcar, Ivo Felix, Rudolf Höhnl, Zdeněk Janouch, Karel Kodejška, Leoš Škoda
East Germany	8	Dietmar Aschenbach, Hans-Georg Aschenbach, Jochen Danneberg, Bernd Eckstein, Henry Glaß, Dietrich Kampf, Rainer Schmidt, Martin Weber
Finland	6	Harri Blumen, P. Hyvävinen, Tauno Käyhkö, Tapio Räisänen, Esko Rautionaho, Jouko Törmänen
France	4	Jacques Gaillard, Philippe Jacoberger, Gilbert Poirot, Michel Roche
Norway	7	Per Bergerud, Odd Grette, Finn Halvorsen, Bjarne Næs, Johan Sætre, Kai Solbustad
Poland	5	Stanisław Bobak, Adam Krzysztofiak, Tadeusz Pawlusiak, Aleksander Stołowski, Janusz Waluś
Soviet Union	7	Aleksey Borovitin, Yury Ivanov, Yury Kalinin, Aleksandr Karapuzov, Gariy Napalkov, Sergey Saychik, Sergey Suslikov
Sweden	9	Odd Brandsegg, Lennart Elimä, Christer Karlsson, Håkon Lindbäck, Thomas Lundgren, Anders Lundqvist, Esa Mattila, Rolf Nordgren, N.O. Westberg
Switzerland	6	Josef Bonetti, Ernst Egloff, Robert Mösching, Hans Schmid, Walter Steiner, Ernst von Grünigen
United States	5	Jim Denney, Jerry Martin, Chris McNeill, Ron Steele, Greg Windsperger
Yugoslavia	6	Janez Demšar, Branko Dolhar, Janez Loštrek, Marko Mlakar, Bogdan Norčič, Peter Štefančič

== Results ==
=== Oberstdorf ===
(West Germany) Schattenbergschanze, Oberstdorf
30 December 1975

Rank	Name	Points
1	(Austria) Toni Innauer	252.2
2	(East Germany) Jochen Danneberg	249.8
3	(Austria) Reinhold Bachler	247.1
4	(East Germany) Hans-Georg Aschenbach	242.8
5	(Poland) Stanisław Bobak	239.2
6	(Austria) Rudolf Wanner	239.0
7	(Austria) Karl Schnabl	238.2
8	(East Germany) Bernd Eckstein	237.0
9	(Switzerland) Walter Steiner	236.1
10	(West Germany) Sepp Schwinghammer	229.8

=== Garmisch-Partenkirchen ===
(West Germany) Große Olympiaschanze, Garmisch-Partenkirchen
1 January 1976

Rank	Name	Points
1	(Austria) Toni Innauer	231.3
2	(Austria) Karl Schnabl	229.6
3	(East Germany) Jochen Danneberg	227.5
4	(Austria) Reinhold Bachler	214.7
5	(Soviet Union) Aleksey Borovitin	213.0
6	(Switzerland) Ernst von Grünigen	212.9
7	(Poland) Tadeusz Pawlusiak	212.5
8	(East Germany) Hans-Georg Aschenbach	212.2
9	(East Germany) Dietmar Aschenbach	208.6
10	(Soviet Union) Aleksandr Karapuzov	207.7

=== Innsbruck ===
(Austria) Bergiselschanze, Innsbruck
4 January 1976

After his two victories, Toni Innauer only placed 24th (181.5 pts), losing over 30 points to his closest competitors and falling back to 4th place in the overall ranking.

Rank	Name	Points
1	(East Germany) Jochen Danneberg	220.9
2	(Austria) Karl Schnabl	219.6
3	(Austria) Reinhold Bachler	217.7
4	(Switzerland) Walter Steiner	208.3
5	(Austria) Rudolf Wanner	205.4
6	(Czechoslovakia) Rudolf Höhnl	203.0
7	(Austria) Hans Wallner	198.1
8	(Austria) Walter Schwabl	196.5
8	(Norway) Johan Sætre	196.5
10	(West Germany) Sepp Schwinghammer	195.7

=== Bischofshofen ===
(Austria) Paul-Ausserleitner-Schanze, Bischofshofen
6 January 1976

Rank	Name	Points
1	(Austria) Toni Innauer	236.2
2	(Poland) Stanisław Bobak	225.5
3	(Norway) Johan Sætre	225.0
4	(Austria) Karl Schnabl	223.5
5	(Austria) Reinhold Bachler	222.4
6	(East Germany) Jochen Danneberg	222.0
7	(Austria) Rudolf Wanner	218.0
8	(East Germany) Bernd Eckstein	216.9
9	(Czechoslovakia) Rudolf Höhnl	212.2
10	(Soviet Union) Aleksey Borovitin	211.2

== Final ranking ==
Rank	Name	Oberstdorf	Garmisch-Partenkirchen	Innsbruck	Bischofshofen	Points
1	(East Germany) Jochen Danneberg	2nd	3rd	1st	6th	920.2
2	(Austria) Karl Schnabl	7th	2nd	2nd	4th	910.9
3	(Austria) Reinhold Bachler	3rd	4th	3rd	5th	901.9
4	(Austria) Toni Innauer	1st	1st	24th	1st	901.2
5	(Austria) Rudolf Wanner	6th	13th	5th	7th	868.9
6	(Poland) Stanisław Bobak	5th	22nd	15th	2nd	851.4
7	(Switzerland) Walter Steiner	9th	24th	4th	14th	848.6
8	(Czechoslovakia) Rudolf Höhnl	11th	15th	6th	9th	847.8
9	(East Germany) Bernd Eckstein	8th	27th	16th	8th	834.8
10	(West Germany) Sepp Schwinghammer	10th	26th	10th	11th	831.6
