= 1974–75 Four Hills Tournament =

Ski jumping competition

Four Hills Tournament
- Venues: Schattenbergschanze, Bergiselschanze, Große Olympiaschanze, Paul-Ausserleitner-Schanze
- Location: West Germany, Austria
- Dates: 29 December 1974 – 6 January 1975
- Competitors: 86 from 17 nations

Medalists
gold medal	(Austria) Willi Pürstl
silver medal	(Austria) Edi Federer
bronze medal	(Austria) Karl Schnabl

At the 23rd edition of the annual Four Hills Tournament, Willi Pürstl became the first Austrian tour winner since Sepp Bradl, who won the inaugural tournament.

Karl Schnabl, who only placed 35th (170.5 pts) in Oberstdorf, became the third person within five years to win three out of four events and still fail to win the tournament.

== Participating nations and athletes ==
Nation	Number of Athletes	Athletes
West Germany	5	Toni Angerer, Peter Dubb, Alfred Grosche, Sepp Schwinghammer, Rudi Tusch
Austria	8	Reinhold Bachler, Edi Federer, Alois Lipburger, Hans Millonig, Alfred Pungg, Willi Pürstl, Karl Schnabl, Hans Wallner
Canada	5	Richard Grady, Richard Graves, Paul Martin, Lyle Speers, Peter Wilson
Czechoslovakia	6	Jindřich Balcar, Rudolf Höhnl, Karel Kodejška, Břetislav Novák, František Novák, Leoš Škoda
East Germany	8	Dietmar Aschenbach, Hans-Georg Aschenbach, Jochen Danneberg, Henry Glaß, Dietrich Kampf, Rainer Schmidt, Eberhard Seifert, Heinz Wosipiwo
Finland	4	Harri Blumen, Paavo Maunu, Esko Rautionaho, Jouko Törmänen, Kari Ylianttila
France	4	Jacques Gaillard, Philippe Jacoberger, Gilbert Poirot, Michel Roche
Hungary	2	Gyula Henyel, István Roman
Italy	3	Marcello Bazana, Leo De Crignis, Lido Tomasi
Japan	6	Kasuhiro Akimoto, Takao Itō, Koji Kakuta, Yūji Katsuro, Hideyuki Kuwabara, Manabu Ono
Norway	6	Per Bergerud, Dag Fossum, Finn Halvorsen, Odd Hammernes, Johan Sætre, Kai Solbustad
Poland	4	Stanisław Bobak, Wojciech Fortuna, Adam Krzysztofiak, Aleksander Stołowski
Soviet Union	5	Dimitri Abramow, Aleksey Borovitin, Yury Kalinin, Alexei Petrow, Sergey Suslikov
Sweden	3	Odd Brandsegg, Lennart Elimä, Christer Karlsson
Switzerland	4	Ernst Egloff, Robert Mösching, Hans Schmid, Ernst von Grünigen
United States	6	Gene Burmeister, Jim Denney, Tom Dargay, Terry Kern, Ron Steele, Greg Windsperger
Yugoslavia	6	Janez Demšar, Branko Dolhar, Bogdan Norčič, Marian Prelovšek, Danilo Pudgar, Stane Rakar

== Results ==
=== Oberstdorf ===
(West Germany) Schattenbergschanze, Oberstdorf
29 December 1974

Rank	Name	Points
1	(Austria) Willi Pürstl	217.4
2	(Poland) Stanisław Bobak	210.9
3	(East Germany) Rainer Schmidt	210.6
4	(Norway) Finn Halvorsen	203.0
5	(Norway) Johan Sætre	200.9
6	(Austria) Edi Federer	200.5
7	(Soviet Union) Yury Kalinin	199.3
8	(Finland) Paavo Maunu	198.8
9	(East Germany) Heinz Wosipiwo	194.6
10	(Switzerland) Hans Schmid	193.8

=== Garmisch-Partenkirchen ===
(West Germany) Große Olympiaschanze, Garmisch-Partenkirchen
1 January 1975

Rank	Name	Points
1	(Austria) Karl Schnabl	226.2
2	(Finland) Kari Ylianttila	226.0
3	(Austria) Hans Millonig	222.2
4	(Austria) Edi Federer	221.6
5	(Austria) Willi Pürstl	220.7
6	(East Germany) Rainer Schmidt	220.3
7	(East Germany) Hans-Georg Aschenbach	220.1
8	(Austria) Alois Lipburger	216.2
9	(Soviet Union) Sergey Suslikov	213.5
10	(East Germany) Jochen Danneberg	209.4

=== Innsbruck ===
(Austria) Bergiselschanze, Innsbruck
3 January 1975

Rank	Name	Points
1	(Austria) Karl Schnabl	239.6
2	(Austria) Edi Federer	233.3
3	(Austria) Hans Wallner	231.3
4	(Czechoslovakia) Karel Kodejška	226.4
5	(Austria) Willi Pürstl	226.0
6	(Poland) Stanisław Bobak	225.3
7	(East Germany) Jochen Danneberg	224.8
8	(Czechoslovakia) Rudolf Höhnl	224.3
9	(Austria) Reinhold Bachler	222.7
10	(East Germany) Dietrich Kampf	221.7

=== Bischofshofen ===
(Austria) Paul-Ausserleitner-Schanze, Bischofshofen
6 January 1975

Rank	Name	Points
1	(Austria) Karl Schnabl	227.0
2	(Czechoslovakia) Karel Kodejška	224.6
3	(East Germany) Hans-Georg Aschenbach	221.1
4	(Czechoslovakia) Rudolf Höhnl	220.9
5	(Austria) Edi Federer	218.8
6	(Austria) Hans Millonig	215.7
7	(Austria) Willi Pürstl	214.9
8	(East Germany) Jochen Danneberg	211.3
9	(East Germany) Dietrich Kampf	210.0
10	(East Germany) Eberhard Seifert	208.8

== Final ranking ==
Rank	Name	Oberstdorf	Garmisch-Partenkirchen	Innsbruck	Bischofshofen	Points
1	(Austria) Willi Pürstl	1st	5th	5th	7th	879.0
2	(Austria) Edi Federer	6th	4th	2nd	5th	874.2
3	(Austria) Karl Schnabl	35th	1st	1st	1st	863.3
4	(Czechoslovakia) Karel Kodejška	11th	14th	4th	2nd	853.2
5	(Poland) Stanisław Bobak	2nd	18th	6th	22nd	839.4
6	(East Germany) Rainer Schmidt	3rd	6th	12th	30th	834.4
7	(Czechoslovakia) Rudolf Höhnl	24th	22nd	8th	4th	831.7
8	(East Germany) Jochen Danneberg	21st	10th	7th	8th	829.2
9	(Soviet Union) Yury Kalinin	7th	12th	19th	12th	821.8
10	(Austria) Hans Wallner	17th	24th	3rd	20th	821.6
