= Ski jumping at the 1976 Winter Olympics – Normal hill individual =

Men's normal hill individual at the XII Olympic Winter Games
- Pictogram for ski jumping
- Venue: Seefeld
- Dates: 7 February 1976
- Competitors: 55 from 15 nations
- winning score: 252.0

Medalists
1st place, gold medalist(s)		Hans-Georg Aschenbach; East Germany
2nd place, silver medalist(s)		Jochen Danneberg; East Germany
3rd place, bronze medalist(s)		Karl Schnabl; Austria

The men's normal hill individual ski jumping competition for the 1976 Winter Olympics was held at Seefeld. It took place on 15 February.

== Results ==
Rank	Athlete	Country	Jump 1	Jump 2	Total
1st place, gold medalist(s)	Hans-Georg Aschenbach	East Germany	128.0	124.0	252.0
2nd place, silver medalist(s)	Jochen Danneberg	East Germany	124.4	121.8	246.2
3rd place, bronze medalist(s)	Karl Schnabl	Austria	121.8	120.2	242.0
4	Jaroslav Balcar	Czechoslovakia	118.9	120.7	239.6
5	Ernst von Grünigen	Switzerland	119.1	119.6	238.7
6	Reinhold Bachler	Austria	118.1	119.1	237.2
7	Rudi Wanner	Austria	116.5	117.0	233.5
7	Toni Innauer	Austria	115.6	117.9	233.5
9	Walter Steiner	Switzerland	117.3	114.9	232.2
10	Alfred Grosche	West Germany	115.3	116.6	231.9
11	Esko Rautionaho	Finland	116.5	113.1	229.6
12	Aleksandr Karapuzov	Soviet Union	112.6	114.2	226.8
13	Hans Schmid	Switzerland	112.1	114.2	226.3
14	Jouko Törmänen	Finland	112.4	112.6	225.0
15	Aleksey Borovitin	Soviet Union	111.3	113.6	224.9
16	Rudolf Höhnl	Czechoslovakia	112.6	111.4	224.0
16	Yukio Kasaya	Japan	114.1	109.9	224.0
18	Johan Sætre	Norway	112.6	109.9	222.5
18	Karel Kodejška	Czechoslovakia	108.4	114.1	222.5
20	Hiroshi Itagaki	Japan	109.4	111.7	221.1
21	Jim Denney	United States	110.7	108.2	218.9
22	Yury Kalinin	Soviet Union	105.5	113.2	218.7
23	Sepp Schwinghammer	West Germany	106.1	109.2	215.3
24	Takao Ito	Japan	106.8	107.1	213.9
25	Sergey Saychik	Soviet Union	105.2	108.4	213.6
26	Ivo Felix	Czechoslovakia	105.3	107.4	212.7
27	Jerry Martin	United States	109.6	103.0	212.6
28	Stanisław Bobak	Poland	104.2	106.8	211.0
29	Koji Kakuta	Japan	104.5	105.9	210.4
30	Harri Blumén	Finland	105.6	104.8	210.4
31	Tadeusz Pawlusiak	Poland	105.5	104.7	210.2
32	Bernd Eckstein	East Germany	118.6	90.7	209.3
33	Odd Hammernes	Norway	103.5	104.8	208.3
34	Greg Windsperger	United States	103.9	104.1	208.0
35	Robert Mösching	Switzerland	104.3	103.3	207.6
36	Peter Wilson	Canada	103.8	103.5	207.3
37	Finn Halvorsen	Norway	103.8	102.5	206.3
38	Adam Krzysztofiak	Poland	100.0	105.8	205.8
38	Bogdan Norčič	Yugoslavia	102.5	103.3	205.8
38	Marcello Bazzana	Italy	103.8	102.0	205.8
41	Odd Brandsegg	Sweden	99.2	105.4	204.6
42	Branko Dolhar	Yugoslavia	104.1	100.0	204.1
43	Per Bergerud	Norway	100.3	103.7	204.0
44	Henry Glaß	East Germany	118.3	85.5	203.8
45	Lido Tomasi	Italy	101.4	101.9	203.3
46	Ivo Zupan	Yugoslavia	103.8	98.5	202.3
47	Janez Demšar	Yugoslavia	98.3	101.5	199.8
48	Richard Grady	Canada	96.3	96.3	192.6
49	Francesco Giacomelli	Italy	94.9	97.0	191.9
50	Leo De Crignis	Italy	91.1	99.7	190.8
51	Thomas Lundgren	Sweden	100.7	87.3	188.0
52	Janusz Waluś	Poland	92.7	92.5	185.2
53	Kip Sundgaard	United States	89.6	88.0	177.6
54	Kim Fripp	Canada	91.2	84.7	175.9
55	Donald Grady	Canada	85.7	79.2	164.9
