= Ski jumping at the 1976 Winter Olympics – Large hill individual =

Men's large hill individual at the XII Olympic Winter Games
- Pictogram for ski jumping
- Venue: Bergiselschanze
- Dates: February 15, 1976
- Competitors: 54 from 15 nations
- Winning score: 234.8

Medalists
1st place, gold medalist(s)		Karl Schnabl; Austria
2nd place, silver medalist(s)		Toni Innauer; Austria
3rd place, bronze medalist(s)		Henry Glaß; East Germany

The men's large hill individual ski jumping competition for the 1976 Winter Olympics was held in Bergiselschanze. It occurred on 15 February.

== Results ==
Rank	Athlete	Country	Jump 1	Jump 2	Total
1st place, gold medalist(s)	Karl Schnabl	Austria	117.5	117.3	234.8
2nd place, silver medalist(s)	Toni Innauer	Austria	126.5	106.4	232.9
3rd place, bronze medalist(s)	Henry Glaß	East Germany	104.4	117.3	221.7
4	Jochen Danneberg	East Germany	118.8	102.8	221.6
5	Reinhold Bachler	Austria	111.5	105.9	217.4
6	Hans Wallner	Austria	109.4	107.5	216.9
7	Bernd Eckstein	East Germany	109.6	106.6	216.2
8	Hans-Georg Aschenbach	East Germany	109.5	102.6	212.1
9	Walter Steiner	Switzerland	99.8	108.7	208.5
10	Jouko Törmänen	Finland	105.4	99.5	204.9
11	Sergey Saychik	Soviet Union	101.5	98.5	200.0
12	Esko Rautionaho	Finland	103.5	94.3	197.8
13	Johan Sætre	Norway	99.2	96.0	195.2
14	Jaroslav Balcar	Czechoslovakia	98.7	95.9	194.6
15	Aleksandr Karapuzov	Soviet Union	104.9	88.6	193.5
16	Alfred Grosche	West Germany	100.3	92.8	193.1
17	Yukio Kasaya	Japan	95.9	96.4	192.3
18	Jim Denney	United States	99.1	92.0	191.1
19	Aleksey Borovitin	Soviet Union	95.5	92.0	187.5
20	Hans Schmid	Switzerland	95.6	90.7	186.3
21	Rauno Miettinen	Finland	96.2	89.2	185.4
22	Takao Ito	Japan	95.5	87.7	183.2
23	Ernst von Grünigen	Switzerland	93.3	89.1	182.4
24	Yury Kalinin	Soviet Union	94.0	87.5	181.5
25	Odd Brandsegg	Sweden	96.9	84.5	181.4
26	Per Bergerud	Norway	89.6	90.1	179.7
27	Jindřich Balcar	Czechoslovakia	94.7	83.4	178.1
28	Bogdan Norčič	Yugoslavia	90.5	87.5	178.0
29	Minoru Wakasa	Japan	90.4	87.1	177.5
30	Terry Kern	United States	89.7	86.5	176.2
31	Karel Kodejška	Czechoslovakia	95.2	80.6	175.8
32	Jerry Martin	United States	94.0	81.7	175.7
33	Hiroshi Itagaki	Japan	95.4	79.8	175.2
34	Rudolf Höhnl	Czechoslovakia	92.7	82.4	175.1
35	Finn Halvorsen	Norway	90.0	83.2	173.2
36	Jim Maki	United States	89.0	82.4	171.4
37	Stanisław Bobak	Poland	81.4	86.6	168.0
38	Robert Mösching	Switzerland	87.6	80.1	167.7
39	Janusz Waluś	Poland	84.1	83.4	167.5
40	Marek Pach	Poland	88.5	76.2	164.7
41	Harri Blumén	Finland	84.4	76.3	160.7
42	Branko Dolhar	Yugoslavia	85.2	75.0	160.2
43	Janez Demšar	Yugoslavia	86.7	71.1	157.8
44	Francesco Giacomelli	Italy	83.4	74.2	157.6
45	Peter Wilson	Canada	79.4	75.3	154.7
46	Richard Grady	Canada	80.4	72.9	153.3
47	Lido Tomasi	Italy	80.8	71.3	152.1
48	Donald Grady	Canada	78.1	71.4	149.5
49	Leo De Crignis	Italy	71.4	71.9	143.3
50	Odd Hammernes	Norway	78.4	63.9	142.3
51	Marcello Bazzana	Italy	72.1	65.9	138.0
52	Tadeusz Pawlusiak	Poland	74.0	56.8	130.8
53	Kim Fripp	Canada	68.6	57.3	125.9
54	Ivo Zupan	Yugoslavia	52.2	67.2	119.4
