= 1973–74 Four Hills Tournament =

Ski jumping competition

Four Hills Tournament
- Venues: Schattenbergschanze, Bergiselschanze, Große Olympiaschanze, Paul-Ausserleitner-Schanze
- Location: West Germany, Austria
- Dates: 30 December 1973 – 5 January 1974
- Competitors: 100 from 17 nations

Medalists
gold medal	(East Germany) Hans-Georg Aschenbach
silver medal	(Switzerland) Walter Steiner
bronze medal	(East Germany) Bernd Eckstein

The 21st annual Four Hills Tournament was won by East German athlete Hans-Georg Aschenbach. After a dominating victory at the first event in Oberstdorf, and three more podium finishes, he ended up with a 43-point lead over second-placed Walter Steiner, who became the first Swiss to win a Four Hills event in Garmisch-Partenkirchen.

== Participating nations and athletes ==
Nation	Number of Athletes	Athletes
West Germany	8	Toni Angerer, Klaus Boll, Peter Dubb, Alfred Grosche, Sepp Schwinghammer, Rudi Tusch, Ernst Wursthorn, Bernd Zapf
Austria	10	Reinhold Bachler, Sepp Gratzer, Walter Habersatter, Toni Innauer, Hans Millonig, Willi Pürstl, Karl Schnabl, Walter Schwabl, Hans Wallner, Rudolf Wanner
Bulgaria	5	Georgi Geliov, Georgi Lasev, Ivan Scharkov, Ivan Schopov, Tascho Sterev
Canada	5	Richard Grady, Richard Graves, Knut Nordle, Tom Reaper, Peter Wilson
Czechoslovakia	6	Rudolf Höhnl, Karel Kodejška, Jaromír Liďák, Jan Matouš, Jiří Raška, Leoš Škoda
East Germany	8	Dietmar Aschenbach, Hans-Georg Aschenbach, Jochen Danneberg, Bernd Eckstein, Henry Glaß, Dietrich Kampf, Rainer Schmidt, Heinz Wosipiwo
Finland	4	Tauno Käyhkö, Esko Rautionaho, Jouko Törmänen, Kari Ylianttila
France	5	Jacques Gaillard, Philippe Jacoberger, Gilbert Poirot, Yvan Richard, James Yerrly
Italy	4	Ermes Bontempelli, Sandro Dalle Ave, Maurizio Dünnhofer, Lido Tomasi
Japan	7	Kasuhiro Akimoto, Masakatsu Asari, Hiroshi Itagaki, Takao Itō, Yūji Katsuro, Akitsugu Konno, Hisayoshi Sawada
Norway	4	Odd Grette, Arnfinn Henden, Bjarne Næs, Johan Sætre
Poland	5	Stanisław Bobak, Wojciech Fortuna, Czesław Janik, Adam Krzysztofiak, Tadeusz Pawlusiak
Soviet Union	6	Sergei Botschkov, Wladimir Frolov, Yury Kalinin, Aleks Karapusov, Gariy Napalkov, Wladimir Napylow
Sweden	5	Lennart Elimä, Christer Karlsson, Thomas Lundgren, Andreas Lundquist, Rolf Nordgren
Switzerland	6	Eric Aubert, Josef Bonetti, Hans Schmid, Walter Steiner, Ernst von Grünigen, Josef Zehnder
United States	6	Arne Haugen, Jerry Martin, Jay Rand, Ron Steele, Greg Windsperger, Jeff Wright
Yugoslavia	6	Branko Dolhar, Janez Jurman, Marjan Mesec, Marian Prelovšek, Danilo Pudgar, Peter Štefančič

== Results ==
=== Oberstdorf ===
(West Germany) Schattenbergschanze, Oberstdorf
30 December 1973

Rank	Name	Points
1	(East Germany) Hans-Georg Aschenbach	245.1
2	(East Germany) Heinz Wosipiwo	225.0
3	(Switzerland) Hans Schmid	222.8
4	(Finland) Esko Rautionaho	221.3
5	(Soviet Union) Yury Kalinin	218.9
6	(Finland) Kari Ylianttila	217.8
7	(Germany) Alfred Grosche	217.3
8	(Poland) Tadeusz Pawlusiak	211.8
9	(East Germany) Jochen Danneberg	210.5
10	(Japan) Hiroshi Itagaki	210.4
10	(Japan) Hisayoshi Sawada	210.4

=== Garmisch-Partenkirchen ===
(West Germany) Große Olympiaschanze, Garmisch-Partenkirchen
1 January 1974

Walter Steiner became the first Swiss ski jumper to win an event at a Four Hills Tournament. After a second result that placed him far ahead of the main field, Hans-Georg Aschenbach left the New Year's event with a lead of 34 points to his closest rival, Hans Schmid.

Rank	Name	Points
1	(Switzerland) Walter Steiner	240.9
2	(East Germany) Hans-Georg Aschenbach	239.4
3	(East Germany) Dietrich Kampf	227.9
4	(Switzerland) Hans Schmid	227.7
5	(East Germany) Henry Glaß	227.3
6	(East Germany) Bernd Eckstein	226.7
7	(Finland) Tauno Käyhkö	226.3
8	(Germany) Alfred Grosche	225.2
9	(East Germany) Jochen Danneberg	224.8
10	(Soviet Union) Gariy Napalkov	224.1

=== Innsbruck ===
(Austria) Bergiselschanze, Innsbruck
3 January 1974

Rank	Name	Points
1	(East Germany) Hans-Georg Aschenbach	251.3
2	(Switzerland) Hans Schmid	244.6
3	(Switzerland) Walter Steiner	242.9
4	(East Germany) Henry Glaß	240.5
5	(East Germany) Bernd Eckstein	239.2
6	(Czechoslovakia) Rudolf Höhnl	236.6
7	(Austria) Reinhold Bachler	236.0
8	(Soviet Union) Yury Kalinin	235.7
9	(East Germany) Dietrich Kampf	235.6
10	(Poland) Tadeusz Pawlusiak	234.5

=== Bischofshofen ===
(Austria) Paul-Ausserleitner-Schanze, Bischofshofen
5 January 1974

Rank	Name	Points
1	(East Germany) Bernd Eckstein	237.4
2	(Switzerland) Walter Steiner	235.7
3	(East Germany) Hans-Georg Aschenbach	235.0
4	(East Germany) Dietrich Kampf	230.0
5	(East Germany) Henry Glaß	227.3
6	(Norway) Odd Grette	223.7
7	(Soviet Union) Gariy Napalkov	221.7
8	(Japan) Hiroshi Itagaki	219.3
9	(East Germany) Heinz Wosipiwo	218.5
10	(Switzerland) Hans Schmid	214.7

== Final ranking ==
Rank	Name	Oberstdorf	Garmisch-Partenkirchen	Innsbruck	Bischofshofen	Points
1	(East Germany) Hans-Georg Aschenbach	1st	2nd	1st	3rd	970.6
2	(Switzerland) Walter Steiner	14th	1st	3rd	2nd	927.6
3	(East Germany) Bernd Eckstein	16th	6th	5th	1st	910.0
4	(Switzerland) Hans Schmid	3rd	4th	2nd	10th	909.8
5	(East Germany) Henry Glaß	25th	5th	4th	5th	893.9
6	(East Germany) Dietrich Kampf	22nd	3rd	9th	4th	893.3
7	(West Germany) Alfred Grosche	7th	8th	11th	19th	880.5
8	(East Germany) Heinz Wosipiwo	2nd	16th	28th	9th	876.8
9	(Japan) Hiroshi Itagaki	10th	18th	17th	8th	869.8
10	(Finland) Esko Rautionaho	4th	27th	14th	15th	868.0
