= Planica 1974 =

Coordinates: 46°28′35″N 13°43′16″E

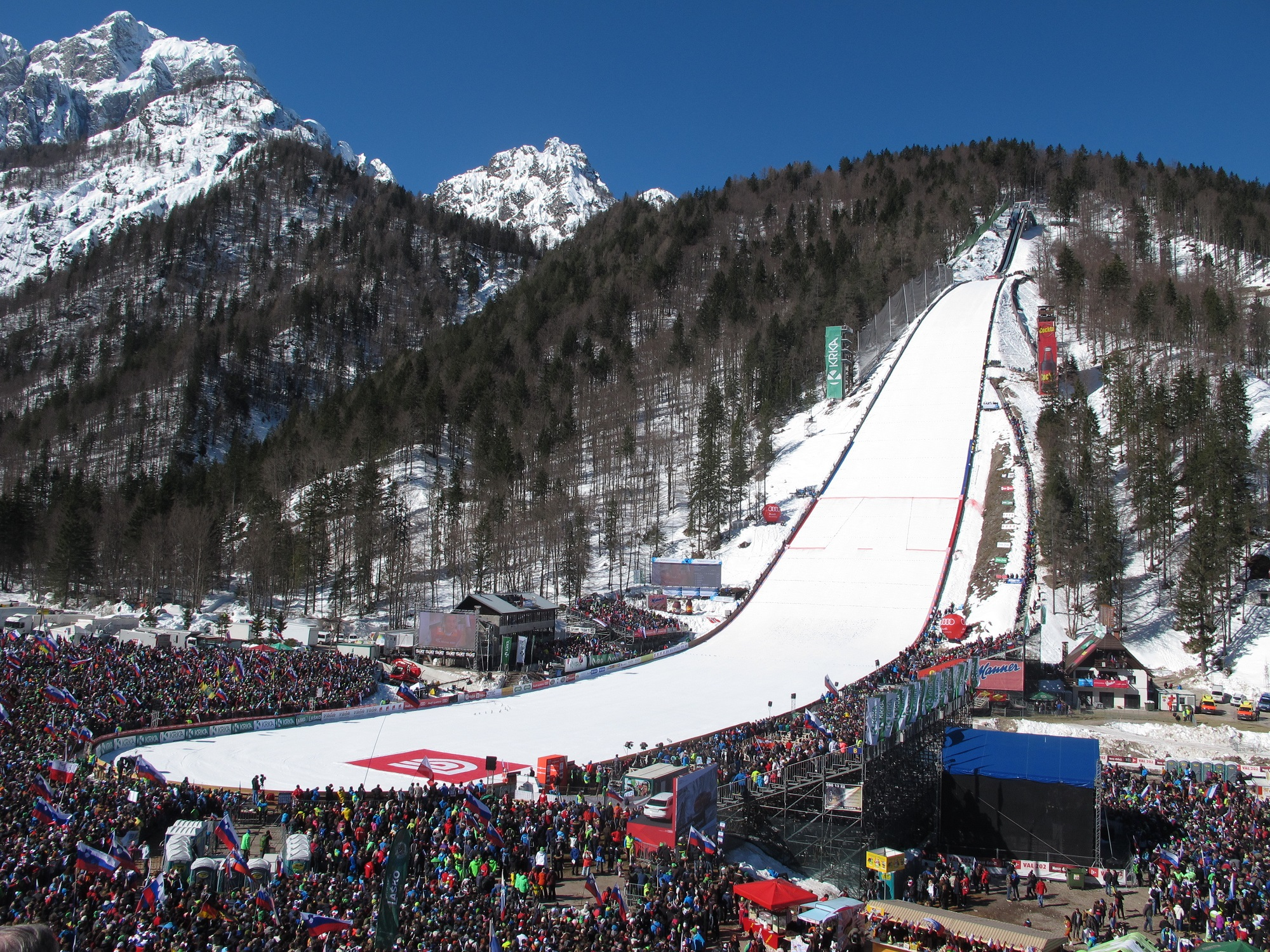
- Host city: Planica, SR Slovenia, Yugoslavia
- Sport: Ski flying
- Events: Smuški poleti Ski Flying Week
- Main venue: Velikanka bratov Gorišek K165

Planica 1974 was a Smuški poleti Ski Flying Week competition, held from 15 to 17 March 1974 in Planica, Yugoslavia. With total 115,000 people in three days.

== Schedule ==
Date	Event	Rounds	Longest jump of the day	Visitors
14 March 1974	Hill test, practice	1	146 metres (479 ft) by Jiří Raška	N/A
15 March 1974	Competition, Day 1	2	169 metres (554 ft) by Walter Steiner; 177 metres (581 ft) by Walter Steiner (fall)	20,000
16 March 1974	Competition, Day 2	2	161 metres (528 ft) by Esko Rautionaho	40,000
17 March 1974	Competition, Day 3	2	166 metres (545 ft) by Walter Steiner	55,000

== Competition ==
On 14 March 1974 hill test and practice was on schedule. Vojko Blaznik was honoured to be first to test the hill this year, landing at 91 metres. Jiří Raška set the distance of the day at 146 metres.

On 15 March 1974 only official training was on schedule at first in front of 20,000 people, but teams and chiefs of competition decided in the last moment, that this will actually be a first day of competition. Best jump of two rounds to count into official results. Day started very promising with tied world record at 169 metres (554 ft), set by Walter Steiner in trial round. In invalid first round where gate was two times lowered, Walter Steiner crashed at 177 metres (581 ft) world record distance.

On 16 March 1974 second day of competition was on schedule in front of 40,000 people. Finnish Esko Rautionaho set the longest jump of the day at 161 meters. Competitors jumped in reversed order from first day competition on Friday with a few exceptions as Norwegians missed the first day of competition and didn't perform: Loštrek (Bib1), D. Pudgar (2), Fossum (6), Sætre (16) and Halvorsen (26). First round was canceled and restarted after first 9 jumpers from a gate lower. As Steiner was last on the start of restarted first round, as only one he jumped even from a gate lower than others and round was valid.

On 17 March 1974 third day of competition was on schedule in front of 55,000 people. First round was canceled and restarted from a lower gate only after 6 jumpers. Whole 1st round was performed from the same gate for all, in the 2nd round Walter Steiner jumped from a gate lower than others and in the 3rd round he jumped even two gates lower than everyone else and still won the competition overshadow other competitors with the longest jump of the day at 166 metres.

=== Competition: Day 1 ===
9:40 AM — 15 March 1974 — 1 best of 2 rounds — first round canceled and restarted — chronological order

Rank	Bib	Name	Trial	1RD (ca)	1RD (re)	2RD	Points
1	28	(Switzerland) Walter Steiner	169.0 m	177.0 m	165.0 m	166.0 m	178.5
2	21	(East Germany) Jochen Danneberg	130.0 m	158.0 m	134.0 m	145.0 m	161.0
3	27	(Finland) Esko Rautionaho	N/A	130.0 m	130.0 m	144.0 m	161.0
4	37	(East Germany) Heinz Wossipiwo	147.0 m	DNS	140.0 m	135.0 m	147.5
5	23	(Austria) Rudolf Wanner	N/A	157.0 m	126.0 m	136.0 m	140.0
6	26	(Czechoslovakia) Jiří Raška	141.0 m	164.0 m	110.0 m	124.0 m	127.5
7	32	(Austria) Hans Wallner	136.0 m	DNS	124.0 m	126.0 m	125.5
8	36	(Finland) Kari Ylianttila	N/A	DNS	N/A	124.0 m	125.5
9	33	(West Germany) Alfred Grosche	N/A	DNS	121.0 m	124.0 m	125.0
10	20	(West Germany) Sepp Schwinghammer	138.0 m	134.0 m	N/A	123.0 m	125.0
11	9	(Finland) Jukka Kalso	N/A	DNS	121.0 m	123.0 m	124.0
12	15	(Switzerland) Josef Bonetti	N/A	DNS	N/A	122.0 m	123.0
13	38	(Socialist Federal Republic of Yugoslavia) Janez Jurman	141.0 m	DNS	N/A	122.0 m	122.0
14	14	(Finland) Seppo Hyvönen	N/A	DNS	N/A	119.0 m	120.0
15	13	(Czechoslovakia) Jaroslav Balcar	N/A	DNS	N/A	118.0 m	119.0
16	3	(Socialist Federal Republic of Yugoslavia) Janez Demšar	N/A	140.0 m	N/A	115.0 m	115.0
17	29	(Socialist Federal Republic of Yugoslavia) Peter Štefančič	N/A	DNS	N/A	114.0 m	115.0
18	19	(Socialist Federal Republic of Yugoslavia) Branko Dolhar	N/A	DNS	N/A	115.0 m	114.0
19	8	(East Germany) Manfred Wolf	143.0 m	135.0 m	N/A	113.0 m	114.0
20	18	(Socialist Federal Republic of Yugoslavia) Bogdan Norčič	131.0 m	DNS	N/A	116.0 m	113.5
21	22	(United States) Tom Dargay	146.0 m	149.0 m	N/A	114.0 m	110.0
22	31	(Socialist Federal Republic of Yugoslavia) Marjan Mesec	N/A	DNS	N/A	111.0 m	109.0
23	1	(Socialist Federal Republic of Yugoslavia) Janez Loštrek	123.0 m	DNS	N/A	110.0 m	107.0
24	11	(Switzerland) Antoine Guignard	N/A	DNS	N/A	105.0 m	104.5
25	24	(Socialist Federal Republic of Yugoslavia) Lojze Gorjanc	N/A	126.0 m	N/A	105.0 m	101.5
26	4	(Socialist Federal Republic of Yugoslavia) Danilo Pudgar	N/A	131.0 m	N/A	104.0 m	101.5
27	6	(West Germany) Albert Wursthorn	N/A	DNS	N/A	104.0 m	101.0
28	25	(France) Gilbert Poirot	N/A	DNS	N/A	102.0 m	98.5
29	7	(Socialist Federal Republic of Yugoslavia) Vojko Blaznik	N/A	DNS	N/A	98.0 m	88.5
30	5	(France) Danick Yerly	N/A	DNS	N/A	90.0 m	83.5
31	12	(United States) Greg Windsperger	146.0 m	DNS	N/A	103.0 m	83.0
32	34	(France) Yvan Richard	N/A	DNS	N/A	107.0 m	70.0
33	17	(Italy) Andreas Dünhoffer	N/A	DNS	N/A	92.0 m	52.0
N/A	2	(Socialist Federal Republic of Yugoslavia) Drago Pudgar	N/A	DNS	DNS	DNS	—
N/A	35	(United States) Ron Steele	N/A	N/A	DNS	DNS	—
N/A	10	(Norway) Dag Fossum	did not start; Norwegians late for competition				—
N/A	16	(Norway) Finn Halvorsen	did not start; Norwegians late for competition				—
N/A	30	(Norway) Johan Sætre	did not start; Norwegians late for competition				—

=== Competition: Day 2 ===
9:30 AM — 16 March 1974 — 1 best of 2 rounds — chronological order incomplete

Rank	Bib	Name	1RD (re)	2RD	Points
1	36	(Switzerland) Walter Steiner	135.0 m	154.0 m	N/A
2	34	(Finland) Esko Rautionaho	161.0 m	125.0 m	N/A
3	6	(Norway) Dag Fossum	N/A**	146.0 m	N/A
35	20	(Socialist Federal Republic of Yugoslavia) Janez Demšar	120.0 m	114.0 m	N/A
N/A	35	(East Germany) Jochen Danneberg	131.0 m	115.0 m	N/A
N/A	33	(East Germany) Heinz Wossipiwo	N/A	124.0 m	N/A
N/A	32	(Austria) Rudolf Wanner	132.0 m	124.0 m	N/A
N/A	31	(Czechoslovakia) Jiří Raška	N/A	125.0 m	N/A
N/A	30	(Austria) Hans Wallner	N/A*	124.0 m	N/A
N/A	29	(Finland) Kari Ylianttila	151.0 m	152.0 m	N/A
N/A	28	(West Germany) Alfred Grosche	144.0 m	123.0 m	N/A
N/A	27	(West Germany) Sepp Schwinghammer	N/A	124.0 m	N/A
N/A	25	(Finland) Jukka Kalso	N/A*	111.0 m	N/A
N/A	24	(Switzerland) Josef Bonetti	N/A*	113.0 m	N/A
N/A	23	(Socialist Federal Republic of Yugoslavia) Janez Jurman	116.0 m	104.0 m	N/A
N/A	22	(Finland) Seppo Hyvönen	N/A*	121.0 m	N/A
N/A	21	(Czechoslovakia) Jaroslav Balcar	N/A*	118.0 m	N/A
N/A	19	(Socialist Federal Republic of Yugoslavia) Peter Štefančič	115.0 m	106.0 m	N/A
N/A	18	(Socialist Federal Republic of Yugoslavia) Branko Dolhar	114.0 m	100.0 m	N/A
N/A	17	(East Germany) Manfred Wolf	136.0 m	127.0 m	N/A
N/A	15	(Socialist Federal Republic of Yugoslavia) Bogdan Norčič	124.0 m	102.0 m	N/A
N/A	14	(United States) Tom Dargay	N/A*	124.0 m	N/A
N/A	13	(Socialist Federal Republic of Yugoslavia) Marjan Mesec	122.0 m	114.0 m	N/A
N/A	1	(Socialist Federal Republic of Yugoslavia) Janez Loštrek	N/A*	104.0 m	N/A
N/A	12	(Switzerland) Antoine Guignard	N/A*	103.0 m	N/A
N/A	11	(Socialist Federal Republic of Yugoslavia) Lojze Gorjanc	N/A*	111.0 m	N/A
N/A	2	(Socialist Federal Republic of Yugoslavia) Danilo Pudgar	1.0 m	99.0 m	N/A
N/A	10	(West Germany) Albert Wursthorn	N/A*	99.0 m	N/A
N/A	9	(France) Gilbert Poirot	N/A*	101.0 m	N/A
N/A	8	(Socialist Federal Republic of Yugoslavia) Vojko Blaznik	N/A*	109.0 m	N/A
N/A	7	(France) Danick Yerly	N/A*	93.0 m	N/A
N/A	5	(United States) Greg Windsperger	137.0 m	124.0 m	N/A
N/A	4	(France) Yvan Richard	N/A*	102.0 m	N/A
N/A	3	(Italy) Andreas Dünhoffer	N/A*	84.0 m	N/A
N/A	26	(Norway) Finn Halvorsen	N/A**	121.0 m	N/A
N/A	16	(Norway) Johan Sætre	N/A**	110.0 m	N/A

=== Competition: Day 3 ===
9:30 AM — 17 March 1974 — 1 best of 3 rounds — chronological order incomplete

Rank	Bib	Name	1RD (ca)	1RD (re)	2RD	3RD	Points
1	36	(Switzerland) Walter Steiner	DNS	166.0 m	147.0 m	148.0 m	533.5
2	35	(Finland) Esko Rautionaho	DNS	147.0 m	130.0 m	N/A	486.5
3	34	(Norway) Dag Fossum	DNS	128.0 m	N/A	143.0 m	465.0
4	N/A	(Norway) Finn Halvorsen	DNS	129.0 m	134.0 m	147.0 m	456.5
5	N/A	(East Germany) Heinz Wossipiwo	DNS	N/A	120.0 m	147.0 m	455.5
6	N/A	(Finland) Kari Ylianttila	DNS	149.0 m	132.0 m	156.0 m	451.5
7	N/A	(Czechoslovakia) Jiří Raška	DNS	N/A	128.0 m	154.0 m	446.5
8	N/A	(Austria) Rudi Wanner	DNS	137.0 m	137.0 m	147.0 m	445.0
9	N/A	(East Germany) Jochen Danneberg	DNS	129.0 m	124.0 m	142.0 m	438.0
10	N/A	(West Germany) Sepp Schwinghammer	DNS	N/A	N/A	134.0 m	412.5
	N/A	(East Germany) Manfred Wolf	DNS	128.0 m	130.0 m	133.0 m	412.5
12	N/A	(Finland) Jukka Kalso	DNS	N/A	N/A	144.0 m	407.0
13	N/A	(Czechoslovakia) Jaroslav Balcar	145.0 m	N/A	N/A	138.0 m	406.3
14	N/A	(Austria) Hans Wallner	DNS	N/A	129.0 m	155.0 m	404.0
15	N/A	(Switzerland) Josef Bonetti	139.0 m	N/A	N/A	137.0 m	401.0
16	2	(Socialist Federal Republic of Yugoslavia) Janez Demšar	138.0 m	110.0 m	114.0 m	139.0 m	398.0
	N/A	(Norway) Johan Sætre	DNS	132.0 m	N/A*	124.0 m	398.0
18	N/A	(West Germany) Alfred Grosche	DNS	N/A*	N/A*	114.0 m	396.0
19	N/A	(Finland) Seppo Hyvönen	138.0 m	N/A	M/A	132.0 m	395.5
20	N/A	(Socialist Federal Republic of Yugoslavia) Janez Jurman	DNS	110.0 m	106.0 m	129.0 m	385.5
21	N/A	(United States) Greg Windsperger	DNS	N/A	133.0 m	133.0 m	381.0
22	N/A	(Socialist Federal Republic of Yugoslavia) Marjan Mesec	DNS	135.0 m	123.0 m	131.0 m	380.5
23	N/A	(Socialist Federal Republic of Yugoslavia) Peter Štefančič	DNS	113.0 m	104.0 m	125.0 m	377.0
24	N/A	(United States) Tom Dargay	DNS	N/A*	N/A*	116.0 m	375.5
25	N/A	(Socialist Federal Republic of Yugoslavia) Bogdan Norčič	DNS	122.0 m	N/A	120.0 m	371.5
26	N/A	(Switzerland) Antoine Guignard	DNS	N/A	N/A	132.0 m	359.0
27	N/A	(Socialist Federal Republic of Yugoslavia) Branko Dolhar	DNS	144.0 m	N/A	115.0 m	357.0
28	N/A	(Socialist Federal Republic of Yugoslavia) Janez Loštrek	DNS	104.0 m	N/A*	113.0 m	344.0
29	N/A	(West Germany) Albert Wursthorn	DNS	N/A*	116.0 m	143.0 m	343.5
30	N/A	(Socialist Federal Republic of Yugoslavia) Lojze Gorjanc	DNS	N/A*	100.0 m	121.0 m	329.0
31	N/A	(Socialist Federal Republic of Yugoslavia) Vojko Blaznik	DNS	N/A*	N/A*	115.0 m	323.5
32	N/A	(France) Gilbert Poirot	DNS	N/A*	N/A*	98.0 m	313.0
33	N/A	(Socialist Federal Republic of Yugoslavia) Danilo Pudgar	DNS	N/A*	N/A*	104.0 m	308.0
34	N/A	(France) Danick Yerly	N/A*	N/A*	97.0 m	97.0 m	291.0
35	N/A	(France) Yvan Richard	DNS	N/A*	N/A*	98.0 m	217.0
36	N/A	(Italy) Andreas Dünhoffer	N/A	N/A	N/A	N/A	145.0

Not recognized. Crash at WR! Didn't count into final results!
Counted into final result!
World record!
Crash, touch!

== Official results ==
Three rounds counted into official results — one best round from each three days.

Rank	Name	15 March	16 March	17 March	Points
Rank	Name	1RD	2RD	3RD	Points
1	(Switzerland) Walter Steiner	166.0 m	154.0 m	166.0 m	533.5
2	(Finland) Esko Rautionaho	144.0 m	161.0 m	147.0 m	486.5
3	(Norway) Dag Fossum	146.0 m	128.0 m	143.0 m	465.0
4	(Norway) Finn Halvorsen	121.0 m	134.0 m	147.0 m	456.5
5	(East Germany) Heinz Wossipiwo	140.0 m	124.0 m	147.0 m	455.5
6	(Finland) Kari Ylianttila	124.0 m	151.0 m	132.0 m	451.5
7	(Czechoslovakia) Jiří Raška	124.0 m	125.0 m	154.0 m	446.5
8	(Austria) Rudi Wanner	136.0 m	132.0 m	147.0 m	445.0
9	(East Germany) Jochen Danneberg	145.0 m	115.0 m	142.0 m	438.0
10	(West Germany) Sepp Schwinghammer	123.0 m	124.0 m	134.0 m	412.5
	(East Germany) Manfred Wolf	113.0 m	136.0 m	130.0 m	412.5
12	(Finland) Jukka Kalso	121.0 m	111.0 m	144.0 m	407.0
13	(Czechoslovakia) Jaroslav Balcar	118.0 m	118.0 m	138.0 m	406.3
14	(Austria) Hans Wallner	126.0 m	124.0 m	129.0 m	404.0
15	(Switzerland) Josef Bonetti	122.0 m	113.0 m	137.0 m	401.0
16	(Socialist Federal Republic of Yugoslavia) Janez Demšar	115.0 m	114.0 m	139.0 m	398.0
17	(Norway) Johan Sætre	110.0 m	118.0 m	124.0 m	398.0
18	(West Germany) Alfred Grosche	124.0 m	144.0 m	114.0 m	396.0
19	(Finland) Seppo Hyvönen	119.0 m	121.0 m	132.0 m	395.5
20	(Socialist Federal Republic of Yugoslavia) Janez Jurman	122.0 m	116.0 m	129.0 m	385.5
21	(United States) Greg Windsperger	103.0 m	137.0 m	133.0 m	381.0
22	(Socialist Federal Republic of Yugoslavia) Marjan Mesec	111.0 m	122.0 m	131.0 m	380.5
23	(Socialist Federal Republic of Yugoslavia) Peter Štefančič	114.0 m	115.0 m	125.0 m	377.0
24	(United States) Tom Dargay	114.0 m	124.0 m	116.0 m	375.5
25	(Socialist Federal Republic of Yugoslavia) Bogdan Norčič	116.0 m	124.0 m	120.0 m	371.5
26	(Switzerland) Antoine Guignard	105.0 m	103.0 m	132.0 m	359.0
27	(Socialist Federal Republic of Yugoslavia) Branko Dolhar	115.0 m	114.0 m	115.0 m	357.0
28	(Socialist Federal Republic of Yugoslavia) Janez Loštrek	110.0 m	104.0 m	104.0 m	344.0
29	(West Germany) Albert Wursthorn	104.0 m	101.0 m	116.0 m	343.5
30	(Socialist Federal Republic of Yugoslavia) Lojze Gorjanc	105.0 m	111.0 m	100.0 m	329.0
31	(Socialist Federal Republic of Yugoslavia) Vojko Blaznik	98.0 m	109.0 m	115.0 m	323.5
32	(France) Gilbert Poirot	102.0 m	101.0 m	98.0 m	313.0
33	(Socialist Federal Republic of Yugoslavia) Danilo Pudgar	104.0 m	99.0 m	104.0 m	308.0
34	(France) Danick Yerly	90.0 m	93.0 m	97.0 m	291.0
35	(France) Yvan Richard	107.0 m	102.0 m	99.0 m	217.0
36	(Italy) Andreas Dünhoffer	92.0 m	84.0 m	—	145.0

== Ski flying world records ==
Date	Name	Country	Metres	Feet
15 March 1974	Walter Steiner	Switzerland	169	554
15 March 1974	Walter Steiner	Switzerland	177	581

Not recognized! Crash at world record distance.

== See also ==
- The Great Ecstasy of Woodcarver Steiner
