= Planica 1977 =

Coordinates: 46°28′35″N 13°43′16″E

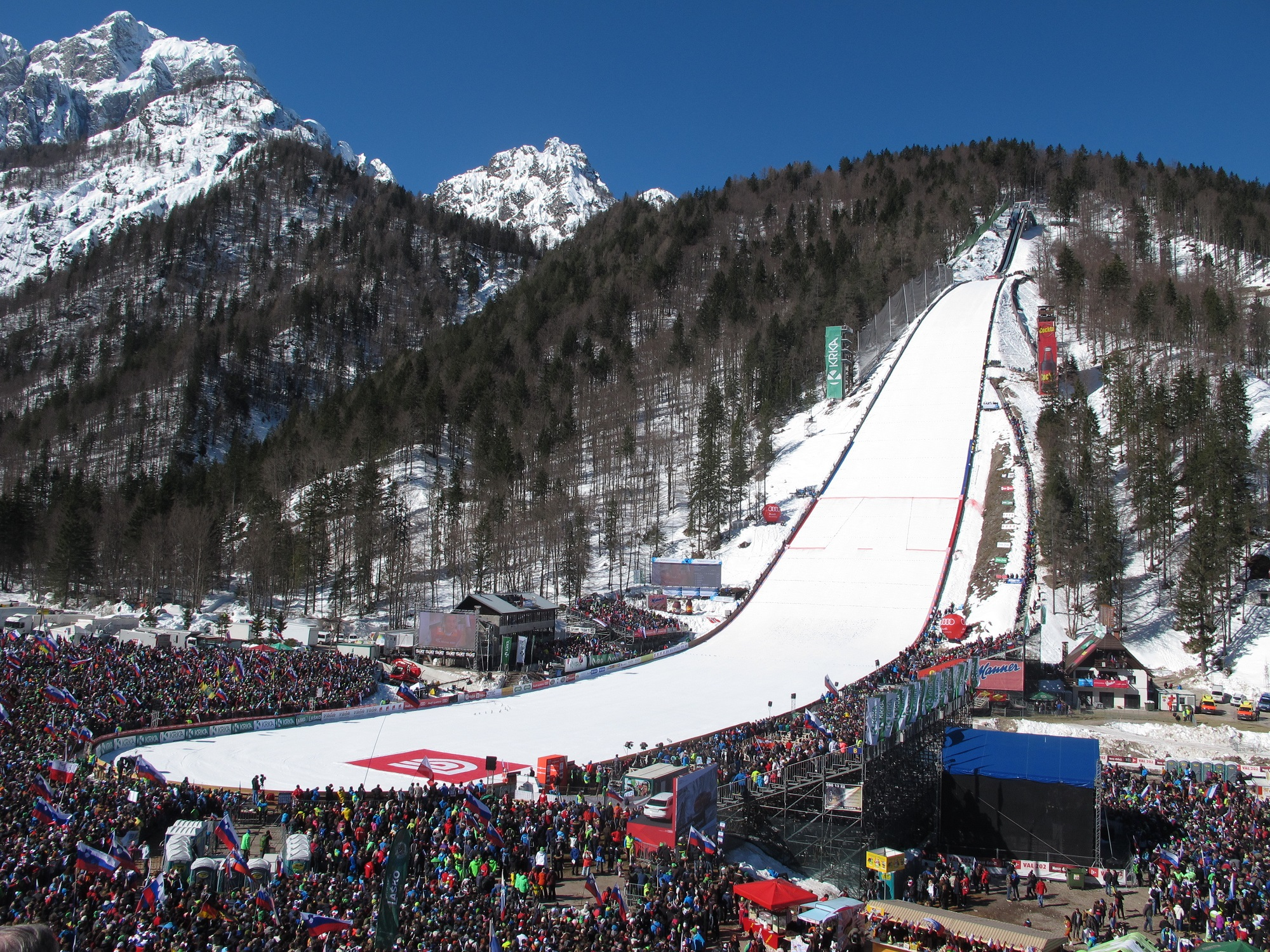
- Host city: Planica, SR Slovenia, Yugoslavia
- Sport: Ski flying
- Events: Smuški poleti Ski Flying Week
- Main venue: Velikanka bratov Gorišek K165

Planica 1977 was a Smuški poleti Ski Flying Week competition, held from 18 to 20 March 1977 in Planica, Yugoslavia. With total 50,000 people in three days.

== Schedule ==
Date	Event	Rounds	Longest jump of the day	Visitors
17 March 1977	Official training	2	165 metres (541 ft) by Reinhold Bachler	N/A
18 March 1977	Competition, Day 1	3	169 metres (554 ft) by Reinhold Bachler	N/A
19 March 1977	Competition, Day 2	2	172 metres (564 ft) by Reinhold Bachler	N/A
20 March 1977	Competition, Day 3	2	181 metres (594 ft) by Bogdan Norčič (touch); 171 metres (561 ft) by Thomas Meisinger	20,000

== Competition ==
On 17 March 1977 official training was on schedule. 23 jumpers from 6 countries who applied for the competition made two training jumps. Bachler was the longest with 165 metres.

On 18 March 1977 first day of competition was on schedule. Austrian Reinhold Bachler was leading after first day with tied hill record, now holding together with Walter Steiner at 169 metres. Best one of three rounds counted into final results.

On 19 March 1977 second day of competition was on schedule. Austrian Reinhold Bachler set the new hill record at 172 metres in the trial round. Best one of two rounds in competition counted into final results.

On 20 March 1977 last third day of competition was on schedule in front of 20,000 people. Yugoslavian Bogdan Norčič touched the ground at trial round at 181 metres world record distance, which was the first ever fly over one hundred-eighty metres in history. Best one of two rounds in competition counted into final results.

=== Official training ===
17 March 1977 — Two rounds — chronological order

Bib	Name	Country	1RD	2RD	3RD
1	Reinhold Bachler	Austria	165.0 m	161.0 m	—
2	Bogdan Norčič	Yugoslavia	164.0 m	153.0 m	—
3	Thomas Meisinger	East Germany	163.0 m	153.0 m	143.0 m
4	Dietrich Kampf	East Germany	154.0 m	148.0 m	121.0 m
5	Jože Demšar	Yugoslavia	154.0 m	147.0 m	129.0 m
6	Hans Wallner	Austria	149.0 m	111.0 m	134.0 m
7	Ladislav Jirásko	Czechoslovakia	146.0 m	112.0 m	149.0 m
8	Per Steinar Nordlien	Norway	144.0 m	142.0 m	137.0 m
9	Janez Loštrek	Yugoslavia	138.0 m	137.0 m	119.0 m
10	Walter Schwabl	Austria	137.0 m	129.0 m	114.0 m
11	Marko Mlakar	Yugoslavia	134.0 m	131.0 m	115.0 m
12	Dag Fossum	Norway	134.0 m	128.0 m	116.0 m
13	Vinko Bogataj	Yugoslavia	134.0 m	126.0 m	110.0 m
14	František Novotný	Czechoslovakia	131.0 m	116.0 m	103.0 m
15	Sepp Schwinghammer	West Germany	128.0 m	125.0 m	116.0 m
16	Andrej Kajzer	Yugoslavia	127.0 m	122.0 m	102.0 m
17	Branko Dolhar	Yugoslavia	125.0 m	105.0 m	—
18	Ivo Zupan	Yugoslavia	123.0 m	120.0 m	93.0 m
19	Per Hartvedt	Norway	119.0 m	116.0 m	109.0 m
20	Janez Demšar	Yugoslavia	103.0 m	98.0 m	95.0 m
21	Andreas Berger	Austria	100.0 m	97.0 m	94.0 m
22	Stanislav Rakar	Yugoslavia	99.0 m	99.0 m	92.0 m
23	Janez Kotar	Yugoslavia	98.0 m	92.0 m	89.0 m

Fall or touch!

=== Competition: Day 1 ===
18 March 1977 — 1 best of 3 rounds

Rank	Name	Points
1	(Austria) Reinhold Bachler	201.0
2	(East Germany) Thomas Meisinger	192.0
3	(Czechoslovakia) Ladislav Jirásko	182.5
4	(Socialist Federal Republic of Yugoslavia) Bogdan Norčič	182.0
	(East Germany) Dietrich Kampf	182.0
6	(Norway) Per Steinar Nordlien	179.5
7	(Norway) Dag Fossum	167.5
8	(Czechoslovakia) František Novotný	164.0
9	(Socialist Federal Republic of Yugoslavia) Branko Dolhar	163.5
	(Socialist Federal Republic of Yugoslavia) Janez Loštrek	163.5
11	(Socialist Federal Republic of Yugoslavia) Vinko Bogataj	159.5
12	(Austria) Walter Schwabl	157.5
13	(West Germany) Sepp Schwinghammer	157.0
14	(Socialist Federal Republic of Yugoslavia) Ivo Zupan	156.0
15	(Socialist Federal Republic of Yugoslavia) Jože Demšar	148.0
16	(Norway) Per Hartvedt	146.0
17	(Socialist Federal Republic of Yugoslavia) Marko Mlakar	145.0
18	(Socialist Federal Republic of Yugoslavia) Janez Demšar	132.5
19	(Austria) Andreas Berger	130.5
20	(Socialist Federal Republic of Yugoslavia) Stanislav Rakar	128.5
21	(Socialist Federal Republic of Yugoslavia) Andrej Kajzer	126.0
22	(Socialist Federal Republic of Yugoslavia) Janez Kotar	122.5
23	(Austria) Hans Wallner	121.5

=== Competition: Day 2 ===
19 March 1977 — 1 best of 3 rounds

Rank	Name	Points
1	(Socialist Federal Republic of Yugoslavia) Bogdan Norčič	193.0
2	(Czechoslovakia) Ladislav Jirásko	189.0
3	(East Germany) Thomas Meisinger	187.5
4	(East Germany) Dietrich Kampf	186.0
5	(Austria) Reinhold Bachler	184.5
6	(Socialist Federal Republic of Yugoslavia) Jože Demšar	179.0
7	(Norway) Per Steinar Nordlien	177.0
8	(Norway) Dag Fossum	175.0
9	(Czechoslovakia) František Novotný	170.0
10	(Socialist Federal Republic of Yugoslavia) Branko Dolhar	158.0
11	(Socialist Federal Republic of Yugoslavia) Marko Mlakar	155.0
12	(Socialist Federal Republic of Yugoslavia) Ivo Zupan	151.5
13	(Socialist Federal Republic of Yugoslavia) Vinko Bogataj	150.5
14	(West Germany) Sepp Schwinghammer	146.0
15	(Austria) Walter Schwabl	144.0
16	(Socialist Federal Republic of Yugoslavia) Stanislav Rakar	130.5
	(Norway) Per Hartvedt	130.5
18	(Austria) Hans Wallner	123.0
19	(Austria) Andreas Berger	122.0
20	(Socialist Federal Republic of Yugoslavia) Janez Loštrek	118.5
21	(Socialist Federal Republic of Yugoslavia) Janez Kotar	116.0
22	(Socialist Federal Republic of Yugoslavia) Janez Demšar	114.5
23	(Socialist Federal Republic of Yugoslavia) Andrej Kajzer	113.5

=== Competition: Day 3 ===
20 March 1977 — 1 best of 3 rounds

Rank	Name	Points
1	(Czechoslovakia) Ladislav Jirásko	192.0
2	(Austria) Reinhold Bachler	189.0
3	(East Germany) Thomas Meisinger	186.5
4	(Socialist Federal Republic of Yugoslavia) Bogdan Norčič	184.5
5	(East Germany) Dietrich Kampf	180.5
6	(Czechoslovakia) František Novotný	176.0
7	(Norway) Dag Fossum	171.5
8	(Norway) Per Steinar Nordlien	170.0
9	(Socialist Federal Republic of Yugoslavia) Janez Demšar	166.0
10	(Socialist Federal Republic of Yugoslavia) Janez Loštrek	165.5
11	(West Germany) Sepp Schwinghammer	165.0
12	(Austria) Walter Schwabl	162.0
13	(Socialist Federal Republic of Yugoslavia) Vinko Bogataj	155.0
14	(Socialist Federal Republic of Yugoslavia) Ivo Zupan	154.0
15	(Socialist Federal Republic of Yugoslavia) Jože Demšar	153.5
16	(Socialist Federal Republic of Yugoslavia) Branko Dolhar	147.5
	(Norway) Per Hartvedt	147.5
18	(Socialist Federal Republic of Yugoslavia) Marko Mlakar	140.0
19	(Socialist Federal Republic of Yugoslavia) Andrej Kajzer	133.0
20	(Austria) Hans Wallner	127.0
21	(Socialist Federal Republic of Yugoslavia) Janez Kotar	115.0
22	(Socialist Federal Republic of Yugoslavia) Stanislav Rakar	105.0

== Official results ==
Three rounds counted into official results — one best round from each three days.

Rank	Name	18 March	19 March	20 March	Points
Rank	Name	1RD	2RD	3RD	Points
1	(Austria) Reinhold Bachler	169.0 m	163.0 m	165.0 m	574.5
2	(East Germany) Thomas Meisinger	157.0 m	166.0 m	171.0 m	566.0
3	(Czechoslovakia) Ladislav Jirásko	160.0 m	161.0 m	158.0 m	563.5
4	(Socialist Federal Republic of Yugoslavia) Bogdan Norčič	165.0 m	164.0 m	168.0 m	559.5
5	(East Germany) Dietrich Kampf	153.0 m	157.0 m	165.0 m	548.5
6	(Norway) Per Steinar Nordlien	167.0 m	168.0 m	157.0 m	526.5
7	(Norway) Dag Fossum	145.0 m	155.0 m	155.0 m	514.0
8	(Czechoslovakia) František Novotný	132.0 m	151.0 m	134.0 m	510.0
9	(Socialist Federal Republic of Yugoslavia) Jože Demšar	122.0 m	163.0 m	146.0 m	480.5
10	(Socialist Federal Republic of Yugoslavia) Branko Dolhar	131.0 m	141.0 m	131.0 m	469.0
11	(West Germany) Sepp Schwinghammer	138.0 m	132.0 m	152.0 m	468.0
12	(Socialist Federal Republic of Yugoslavia) Vinko Bogataj	140.0 m	131.0 m	138.0 m	465.0
13	(Austria) Walter Schwabl	137.0 m	156.0 m	150.0 m	463.5
14	(Socialist Federal Republic of Yugoslavia) Ivo Zupan	138.0 m	140.0 m	136.0 m	461.5
15	(Socialist Federal Republic of Yugoslavia) Janez Loštrek	131.0 m	109.0 m	147.0 m	447.5
16	(Socialist Federal Republic of Yugoslavia) Marko Mlakar	127.0 m	139.0 m	123.0 m	440.0
17	(Norway) Per Hartvedt	118.0 m	114.0 m	132.0 m	424.0
18	(Socialist Federal Republic of Yugoslavia) Janez Demšar	118.0 m	102.0 m	147.0 m	413.0
19	(Socialist Federal Republic of Yugoslavia) Andrej Kajzer	108.0 m	100.0 m	118.0 m	372.5
20	(Austria) Hans Wallner	113.0 m	114.0 m	116.0 m	371.5
21	(Socialist Federal Republic of Yugoslavia) Stanislav Rakar	114.0 m	117.0 m	145.0 m	364.0
22	(Socialist Federal Republic of Yugoslavia) Janez Kotar	108.0 m	106.0 m	99.0 m	354.0
23	(Austria) Andreas Berger	114.0 m	108.0 m	—	252.5

== Invalid ski flying world record ==
This was the first ever jump over 180 metres in history.

Date	Name	Country	Metres	Feet
20 March 1977	Bogdan Norčič	Yugoslavia	181	594

Not recognized! Touch at world record distance.
