= FIS Ski Flying World Championships 1977 =

1977 edition of the FIS Ski-Flying World Championships

The FIS Ski Flying World Championships 1977 took place in Vikersund, Norway on 18 February 1977. Switzerland's Walter Steiner became the first-two-time winner of the championships.

== Individual ==
Rank	Name	Country	1st round	2nd round	3rd round	4th round	Points
1	Walter Steiner	Switzerland	136.0	142.0	140.0	136,0	564.5
2	Toni Innauer	Austria	125.0	145.0	143.0	132.0	547.0
3	Henry Glaß	East Germany	137.0	133.0	130.0	131.0	541.5
4	Aleksey Borovitin	Soviet Union	144.0	123.0	146.0	131.0	539.5
5	Harald Duschek	East Germany	.	.	.	.	533.5
6	František Novák	Czechoslovakia	.	.	.	.	532.0
7	Tapio Räisänen	Finland	.	.	.	.	528.5
8	Martin Weber	East Germany	.	.	.	.	527.0
9	Thomas Meisinger	East Germany	.	.	.	.	523.0
10	Leoš Škoda	Czechoslovakia	.	.	.	.	517.5
11	Yury Ivanov	Soviet Union	.	.	.	.	513.0
12	Per Bergerud	Norway	.	.	.	.	488.0
13	Josef Samek	Czechoslovakia	.	.	.	.	487.5
14	Pekka Hyvärinen	Finland	.	.	.	.	466.5
15	Sergey Saychik	Soviet Union	.	.	.	.	465.5
16	Robert Mösching	Switzerland	.	.	.	.	459.5
17	Bogdan Norčič	Yugoslavia	.	.	.	.	459.0
18	Wladimir Bobjonov	Soviet Union	.	.	.	.	445.5
19	Ján Tánczos	Czechoslovakia	.	.	.	.	440.0
20	Reinhold Bachler	Austria	.	.	.	.	434.0
21	Johan Saetre	Norway	.	.	.	.	431.5
22	Odd Brandsegg	Norway	.	.	.	.	428.5
23	Lennart Elimä	Sweden	.	.	.	.	421.5
24	Alfred Grosche	West Germany	.	.	.	.	415.5
25	Karl Lustenberger	Switzerland	.	.	.	.	399.0
26	Branko Dolhar	Yugoslavia	.	.	.	.	392.5
27	Janez Loštrek	Yugoslavia	.	.	.	.	389.5
28	Frank Rombach	West Germany	.	.	.	.	389.0
29	Finn Halvorsen	Norway	.	.	.	.	386.5
30	Kari Ylianttila	Finland	.	.	.	.	358.5
31	Jim Maki	United States	.	.	.	.	348.0
32	Karl Schnabl	Austria	.	.	.	.	287.0
33	Roger Ruud	Norway	.	.	.	.	254.5
34	Hans Millonig	Austria	.	.	.	.	235.0
35	Seppo Reijonen	Finland	.	.	.	.	210.0
36	Rudi Tusch	West Germany	.	.	.	.	124.5
37	Christer Jolevi	Sweden	.	.	.	.	121.5
38	Marko Mlakar	Yugoslavia	.	.	.	.	118.0
39	Jim Denney	United States	.	.	.	.	113.0
40	Chris McNeill	United States	.	.	.	.	108.5
41	Ken Harkins	United States	.	.	.	.	106.5
41	Slawomir Kardas	Canada	.	.	.	.	106.5

== Medal table ==
Rank	Nation	Gold	Silver	Bronze	Total
1	Switzerland (SUI)	1	0	0	1
2	Austria (AUT)	0	1	0	1
3	East Germany (GDR)	0	0	1	1
Totals (3 entries)		1	1	1	3
