= Soviet Union at the 1976 Winter Olympics =

- Flag of the Soviet Union
- IOC code: URS
- NOC: Soviet Olympic Committee

in Innsbruck
- Competitors: 79 (59 men, 20 women) in 9 sports
- Flag bearer: Vladislav Tretiak (ice hockey)
- Medals Ranked 1st: Gold 13 Silver 6 Bronze 8 Total 27

Winter Olympics appearances (overview)
- 1956; 1960; 1964; 1968; 1972; 1976; 1980; 1984; 1988

Other related appearances
- Latvia (1924–1936, 1992–); Estonia (1928–1936, 1992–); Lithuania (1928, 1992–); Unified Team (1992); Armenia (1994–); Belarus (1994–); Georgia (1994–); Kazakhstan (1994–); Kyrgyzstan (1994–); Moldova (1994–); Russia (1994–2014); Ukraine (1994–); Uzbekistan (1994–); Azerbaijan (1998–); Tajikistan (2002–); Olympic Athletes from Russia (2018); ROC (2022); Individual Neutral Athletes (2026)

The Soviet Union (USSR) competed at the 1976 Winter Olympics in Innsbruck, Austria.

During the games, the Soviet Union won 13 gold medals, the most any country won at a single Winter Olympics. Norway tied this record during the Salt Lake City games, and Canada broke it with 14 when they hosted the Vancouver games.

== Medalists ==
Medal	Name	Sport	Event
Gold	Nikolay Kruglov	Biathlon	Men's 20 km
Gold	Aleksandr Elizarov; Ivan Biakov; Nikolay Kruglov; Aleksandr Tikhonov	Biathlon	Men's 4 x 7.5 km relay
Gold	Nikolay Bazhukov	Cross-country skiing	Men's 15 km
Gold	Sergey Savelyev	Cross-country skiing	Men's 30 km
Gold	Raisa Smetanina	Cross-country skiing	Women's 10 km
Gold	Nina Baldycheva-Fyodorova; Zinaida Amosova; Raisa Smetanina; Galina Kulakova	Cross-country skiing	Women's 4 × 5 km relay
Gold	Irina Rodnina; Alexander Zaitsev	Figure skating	Pairs
Gold	Liudmila Pakhomova; Alexander Gorshkov	Figure skating	Ice dancing
Gold	Soviet Union men's national ice hockey team: Vladislav Tretiak; Aleksandr Sidelnikov; Aleksandr Gusev; Vladimir Lutchenko; Sergei Babinov; Yury Lyapkin; Gennadiy Tsygankov; Sergey Kapustin; Aleksandr Maltsev; Boris Aleksandrov; Boris Mikhailov; Alexander Yakushev; Vladimir Petrov; Valeri Kharlamov; Vladimir Shadrin; Valeri Vasiliev; Viktor Shalimov; Viktor Zhluktov	Ice hockey	Men's competition
Gold	Yevgeny Kulikov	Speed skating	Men's 500m
Gold	Tatyana Averina-Barabash	Speed skating	Women's 1000m
Gold	Galina Stepanskaya	Speed skating	Women's 1500m
Gold	Tatyana Averina-Barabash	Speed skating	Women's 3000m
Silver	Yevgeny Belyayev	Cross-country skiing	Men's 15 km
Silver	Raisa Smetanina	Cross-country skiing	Women's 5 km
Silver	Vladimir Kovalev	Figure skating	Men's singles
Silver	Irina Moiseeva; Andrei Minenkov	Figure skating	Ice dancing
Silver	Valery Muratov	Speed skating	Men's 500m
Silver	Yury Kondakov	Speed skating	Men's 1500m
Bronze	Aleksandr Elizarov	Biathlon	Men's 20 km
Bronze	Ivan Garanin	Cross-country skiing	Men's 30 km
Bronze	Yevgeny Belyayev; Nikolay Bazhukov; Sergey Savelyev; Ivan Garanin	Cross-country skiing	Men's 4 × 10 km relay
Bronze	Nina Baldycheva-Fyodorova	Cross-country skiing	Women's 5 km
Bronze	Galina Kulakova	Cross-country skiing	Women's 10 km
Bronze	Valery Muratov	Speed skating	Men's 1000m
Bronze	Tatyana Averina-Barabash	Speed skating	Women's 500m
Bronze	Tatyana Averina-Barabash	Speed skating	Women's 1500m

== Alpine skiing ==
Men

Athlete	Event	Race 1		Race 2		Total	
Athlete	Event	Time	Rank	Time	Rank	Time	Rank
Vladimir Andreyev	Downhill					1:53.61	44
Vladimir Andreyev	Giant Slalom	DNF	–	–	–	DNF	–
Vladimir Andreyev	Slalom	1:07.01	31	1:10.55	26	2:17.56	25

Women

Athlete	Event	Race 1		Race 2		Total	
Athlete	Event	Time	Rank	Time	Rank	Time	Rank
Alla Askarova	Downhill					1:53.19	28
Alla Askarova	Giant Slalom					1:36.86	32
Alla Askarova	Slalom	DNF	–	–	–	DNF	–

== Biathlon ==
Men

Event	Athlete	Time	Penalties	Adjusted time ^{1}	Rank
20 km	Aleksandr Tikhonov	1'10:18.33	7	1'17:18.33	5
20 km	Aleksandr Elizarov	1'13:05.57	3	1'16:05.57	3rd place, bronze medalist(s)
20 km	Nikolay Kruglov	1'12:12.26	2	1'14:12.26	1st place, gold medalist(s)

Men's 4 x 7.5 km relay

Athletes	Race		
Athletes	Misses ^{2}	Time	Rank
Aleksandr Elizarov; Ivan Biakov; Nikolay Kruglov; Aleksandr Tikhonov	0	1'57:55.64	1st place, gold medalist(s)

== Cross-country skiing ==
Men

Event	Athlete	Race	
Event	Athlete	Time	Rank
15 km	Yury Skobov	46:16.27	16
15 km	Ivan Garanin	44:41.98	4
15 km	Yevgeny Belyayev	44:01.10	2nd place, silver medalist(s)
15 km	Nikolay Bazhukov	43:58.47	1st place, gold medalist(s)
30 km	Vasily Rochev	1'32:39.42	10
30 km	Nikolay Bazhukov	1'31:33.14	5
30 km	Ivan Garanin	1'31:09.29	3rd place, bronze medalist(s)
30 km	Sergey Savelyev	1'30:29.38	1st place, gold medalist(s)
50 km	Yevgeny Belyayev	2'54:00.55	38
50 km	Sergey Savelyev	2'46:01.36	21
50 km	Vasily Rochev	2'44:31.23	12
50 km	Ivan Garanin	2'40:38.94	4

Men's 4 × 10 km relay

Athletes	Race	
Athletes	Time	Rank
Yevgeny Belyayev; Nikolay Bazhukov; Sergey Savelyev; Ivan Garanin	2'10:51.46	3rd place, bronze medalist(s)

Women

Event	Athlete	Race	
Event	Athlete	Time	Rank
5 km	Galina Kulakova	DSQ (doping)	–
5 km	Zinaida Amosova	16:33.78	6
5 km	Nina Baldycheva-Fyodorova	16:12.82	3rd place, bronze medalist(s)
5 km	Raisa Smetanina	15:49.73	2nd place, silver medalist(s)
10 km	Zinaida Amosova	31:11.23	6
10 km	Nina Baldycheva-Fyodorova	30:52.58	4
10 km	Galina Kulakova	30:38.61	3rd place, bronze medalist(s)
10 km	Raisa Smetanina	30:13.41	1st place, gold medalist(s)

Women's 4 × 5 km relay

Athletes	Race	
Athletes	Time	Rank
Nina Baldycheva-Fyodorova; Zinaida Amosova; Raisa Smetanina; Galina Kulakova	1'07:49.75	1st place, gold medalist(s)

== Figure skating ==
Men

Athlete	CF	SP	FS	Points	Places	Rank
Yuri Ovchinnikov	12	8	7	180.04	75	8
Sergei Volkov	1	5	9	184.08	53	5
Vladimir Kovalev	3	6	4	187.64	28	2nd place, silver medalist(s)

Women

Athlete	CF	SP	FS	Points	Places	Rank
Elena Vodorezova	18	13	5	175.58	104	12

Pairs

Athletes	SP	FS	Points	Places	Rank
Marina Leonidova; Vladimir Bogolyubov	9	9	127.06	76	9
Irina Vorobieva; Alexander Vlasov	3	5	134.52	35	4
Irina Rodnina; Alexander Zaitsev	1	1	140.54	9	1st place, gold medalist(s)

Ice Dancing

Athletes	CD	FD	Points	Places	Rank
Natalia Linichuk; Gennadi Karponossov	4	4	199.10	35	4
Irina Moiseeva; Andrei Minenkov	2	2	204.88	20	2nd place, silver medalist(s)
Liudmila Pakhomova; Alexander Gorshkov	1	1	209.92	9	1st place, gold medalist(s)

== Ice hockey ==
=== First round ===
Winners (in bold) entered the Medal Round. Other teams played a consolation round for 7th-12th places.

Team 1	Score	Team 2
**Soviet Union**	16–3	Austria

=== Medal round ===
Rank		Pld	W	L	T	GF	GA	Pts
1	Soviet Union (gold)	5	5	0	0	40	11	10
2	Czechoslovakia	5	3	2	0	17	10	6
3	West Germany	5	2	3	0	21	24	4
4	Finland	5	2	3	0	19	18	4
5	United States	5	2	3	0	15	21	4
6	Poland	5	1	4	0	9	37	2

- USSR 6-2 USA
- USSR 16-1 Poland
- USSR 7-3 West Germany
- USSR 7-2 Finland
- USSR 4-3 Czechoslovakia

Gold:
Vladislav Tretiak
Aleksandr Sidelnikov
Aleksandr Gusev
Vladimir Lutchenko
Sergei Babinov
Yury Lyapkin
Gennadiy Tsygankov
Sergey Kapustin
Aleksandr Maltsev
Boris Aleksandrov
Boris Mikhailov
Alexander Yakushev
Vladimir Petrov
Valeri Kharlamov
Vladimir Shadrin
Valeri Vasiliev
Viktor Shalimov
Viktor Zhluktov

== Luge ==
Men

Athlete	Run 1		Run 2		Run 3		Run 4		Total	
Athlete	Time	Rank	Time	Rank	Time	Rank	Time	Rank	Time	Rank
Aigars Krikis	54.243	16	53.415	11	53.273	15	53.764	17	3:34.695	13
Vladimir Shitov	53.485	11	53.025	9	52.927	10	53.133	11	3:32.570	10
Dainis Bremze	52.984	9	52.567	8	52.364	9	52.661	9	3:30.576	8

(Men's) Doubles

Athletes	Run 1		Run 2		Total	
Athletes	Time	Rank	Time	Rank	Time	Rank
Dainis Bremze; Aigars Krikis	43.667	8	43.740	8	1:27.407	8
Rolands Upatnieks; Valdis Ķuzis	43.732	9	43.825	9	1:27.557	9

Women

Athlete	Run 1		Run 2		Run 3		Run 4		Total	
Athlete	Time	Rank	Time	Rank	Time	Rank	Time	Rank	Time	Rank
Vera Zozuļa	44.179	14	42.973	8	42.651	6	42.858	3	2:52.661	9

== Nordic combined ==
Events:

- normal hill ski jumping (Three jumps, best two counted and shown here.)
- 15 km cross-country skiing

Athlete	Event	Ski Jumping				Cross-country			Total	
Athlete	Event	Distance 1	Distance 2	Points	Rank	Time	Points	Rank	Points	Rank
Aleksey Baranov	Individual	69.0	70.0	185.7	23	51:58.45	184.47	21	370.17	23
Nikolay Nogovitsyn	Individual	72.0	74.0	196.1	16	49:05.97	210.34	3	406.44	6
Valeriy Kopayev	Individual	71.5	75.0	202.9	9	49:53.26	203.24	8	406.14	7

== Ski jumping ==
Athlete	Event	Jump 1		Jump 2		Total	
Athlete	Event	Distance	Points	Distance	Points	Points	Rank
Sergey Saychik	Normal hill	74.0	105.2	76.0	108.4	213.6	25
Yury Kalinin	Normal hill	74.5	105.5	79.0	113.2	218.7	22
Aleksey Borovitin	Normal hill	77.5	111.3	78.0	113.6	224.9	15
Aleksandr Karapuzov	Normal hill	78.0	112.6	79.0	114.2	226.8	12
Yury Kalinin	Large hill	85.0	94.0	80.0	87.5	181.5	24
Aleksey Borovitin	Large hill	85.0	95.5	82.5	92.0	187.5	19
Sergey Saychik	Large hill	90.0	101.5	87.5	98.5	200.0	11
Aleksandr Karapuzov	Large hill	91.0	104.9	81.5	88.6	193.5	15

== Speed skating ==
Men

Event	Athlete	Race	
Event	Athlete	Time	Rank
500 m	Andrey Malikov	40.09	8
500 m	Valery Muratov	39.25	2nd place, silver medalist(s)
500 m	Yevgeny Kulikov	39.17 OR	1st place, gold medalist(s)
1000 m	Andrey Malikov	1:27.57	29
1000 m	Aleksandr Safronov	1:20.84	4
1000 m	Valery Muratov	1:20.57	3rd place, bronze medalist(s)
1500 m	Sergey Marchuk	2:04.65	13
1500 m	Sergey Ryabev	2:02.15	4
1500 m	Yury Kondakov	1:59.97	2nd place, silver medalist(s)
5000 m	Sergey Marchuk	7:51.37	14
5000 m	Vladimir Ivanov	7:37.73	7
5000 m	Viktor Varlamov	7:30.97	4
10,000 m	Vladimir Ivanov	16:16.20	15
10,000 m	Sergey Marchuk	15:43.81	11
10,000 m	Viktor Varlamov	15:06.06	4

Women

Event	Athlete	Race	
Event	Athlete	Time	Rank
500 m	Lyubov Sadchikova	43.80	6
500 m	Vera Krasnova	43.23	5
500 m	Tatyana Averina-Barabash	43.17	3rd place, bronze medalist(s)
1000 m	Tatyana Shelekhova	1:32.08	15
1000 m	Lyudmila Titova	1:30.06	7
1000 m	Tatyana Averina-Barabash	1:28.43 OR	1st place, gold medalist(s)
1500 m	Nina Statkevich	2:22.59	15
1500 m	Tatyana Averina-Barabash	2:17.96	3rd place, bronze medalist(s)
1500 m	Galina Stepanskaya	2:16.58 OR	1st place, gold medalist(s)
3000 m	Tatyana Shelekhova	4:54.03	14
3000 m	Nina Statkevich	4:53.94	13
3000 m	Tatyana Averina-Barabash	4:45.19 OR	1st place, gold medalist(s)

== Medals by republic ==
In the following table for team events number of team representatives, who received medals are counted, not "one medal for all the team", as usual. Because there were people from different republics in one team.

Rank	Nation	Gold	Silver	Bronze	Total
1	Russian SFSR	36	7	11	54
2	Kazakh SSR	2	0	0	2
Totals (2 entries)		38	7	11	56
