= Italy at the 1976 Winter Olympics =

- IOC code: ITA
- NOC: Italian National Olympic Committee
- Website: www.coni.it (in Italian)

in Innsbruck
- Competitors: 58 (47 men, 11 women) in 9 sports
- Flag bearer: Gustav Thöni
- Medals Ranked 10th: Gold 1 Silver 2 Bronze 1 Total 4

Winter Olympics appearances (overview)
- 1924; 1928; 1932; 1936; 1948; 1952; 1956; 1960; 1964; 1968; 1972; 1976; 1980; 1984; 1988; 1992; 1994; 1998; 2002; 2006; 2010; 2014; 2018; 2022; 2026

Italy competed at the 1976 Winter Olympics in Innsbruck, Austria.

== Medalists ==
Medal	Name	Sport	Event
Gold	Piero Gros	Alpine skiing	Men's slalom
Silver	Gustavo Thoeni	Alpine skiing	Men's slalom
Silver	Claudia Giordani	Alpine skiing	Women's slalom
Bronze	Herbert Plank	Alpine skiing	Men's downhill

== Alpine skiing ==
Men

Athlete	Event	Race 1		Race 2		Total	
Athlete	Event	Time	Rank	Time	Rank	Time	Rank
Erwin Stricker	Downhill					DNF	–
Gustavo Thoeni	Downhill					1:49.25	26
Rolando Thoeni	Downhill					1:48.13	14
Herbert Plank	Downhill					1:46.59	3rd place, bronze medalist(s)
Franco Bieler	Giant Slalom	1:47.00	10	1:43.24	7	3:30.24	8
Fausto Radici	Giant Slalom	1:46.87	9	1:43.22	6	3:30.09	7
Piero Gros	Giant Slalom	1:45.69	5	DNF	–	DNF	–
Gustavo Thoeni	Giant Slalom	1:44.19	1	1:43.48	8	3:27.67	4
Fausto Radici	Slalom	DNF	–	–	–	DNF	–
Piero Gros	Slalom	1:01.23	5	1:02.06	1	2:03.29	1st place, gold medalist(s)
Franco Bieler	Slalom	1:01.04	4	DNF	–	DNF	–
Gustavo Thoeni	Slalom	1:00.55	2	1:03.18	2	2:03.73	2nd place, silver medalist(s)

Women

Athlete	Event	Race 1		Race 2		Total	
Athlete	Event	Time	Rank	Time	Rank	Time	Rank
Jolanda Plank	Downhill					1:52.50	25
Wanda Bieler	Downhill					1:50.58	20
Paola Hofer	Downhill					1:49.60	15
Wanda Bieler	Giant Slalom					DNF	–
Paola Hofer	Giant Slalom					1:32.67	23
Claudia Giordani	Giant Slalom					1:31.44	13
Wilma Gatta	Giant Slalom					1:30.51	7
Wilma Gatta	Slalom	DNF	–	–	–	DNF	–
Paola Hofer	Slalom	DNF	–	–	–	DNF	–
Wanda Bieler	Slalom	48.86	11	46.80	8	1:35.66	8
Claudia Giordani	Slalom	46.87	4	44.00	2	1:30.87	2nd place, silver medalist(s)

== Biathlon ==
Men

Event	Athlete	Time	Penalties	Adjusted time ^{1}	Rank
20 km	Pierantonio Clementi	1'16:08.86	7	1'23:08.86	23
20 km	Lino Jordan	1'15:49.83	2	1'17:49.83	7
20 km	Willy Bertin	1'13:50.36	3	1'16:50.36	4

^{1} One minute added per close miss (a hit in the outer ring), two minutes added per complete miss.

Men's 4 x 7.5 km relay

Athletes	Race		
Athletes	Misses ^{2}	Time	Rank
Lino Jordan; Pierantonio Clementi; Luigi Weiss; Willy Bertin	3	2'06:16.55	6

^{2} A penalty loop of 200 metres had to be skied per missed target.

== Bobsleigh ==
Sled	Athletes	Event	Run 1		Run 2		Run 3		Run 4		Total	
Sled	Athletes	Event	Time	Rank	Time	Rank	Time	Rank	Time	Rank	Time	Rank
ITA-1	Giorgio Alverà; Franco Perruguet	Two-man	56.62	7	56.71	6	56.84	8	57.13	9	3:47.30	8
ITA-2	Nevio De Zordo; Ezio Fiori	Two-man	57.71	16	57.58	13	57.88	17	57.95	15	3:51.12	16

Sled	Athletes	Event	Run 1		Run 2		Run 3		Run 4		Total	
Sled	Athletes	Event	Time	Rank	Time	Rank	Time	Rank	Time	Rank	Time	Rank
ITA-1	Giorgio Alverà; Piero Vegnuti; Adriano Bee; Francesco Butteri	Four-man	55.59	10	55.92	12	56.94	14	57.42	12	3:45.87	12
ITA-2	Nevio De Zordo; Ezio Fiori; Roberto Porzia; Lino Benoni	Four-man	55.75	11	55.80	10	57.08	16	57.17	11	3:45.80	11

== Cross-country skiing ==
Men

Event	Athlete	Race	
Event	Athlete	Time	Rank
15 km	Fabrizio Pedranzini	48:58.30	53
15 km	Roberto Primus	47:29.02	36
15 km	Renzo Chiocchetti	47:11.22	29
15 km	Giulio Capitanio	46:51.14	21
30 km	Ulrico Kostner	1'37:49.85	41
30 km	Renzo Chiocchetti	1'37:15.82	38
30 km	Roberto Primus	1'36:40.33	34
30 km	Giulio Capitanio	1'35:58.29	28
50 km	Carlo Favre	DNF	–
50 km	Ulrico Kostner	DNF	–
50 km	Roberto Primus	DNF	–
50 km	Tonio Biondini	DNF	–

Men's 4 × 10 km relay

Athletes	Race	
Athletes	Time	Rank
Renzo Chiocchetti; Tonio Biondini; Ulrico Kostner; Giulio Capitanio	2'12:07.12	7

== Figure skating ==
Women

Athlete	CF	SP	FS	Points	Places	Rank
Susanna Driano	8	7	7	181.62	63	7

Ice Dancing

Athletes	CD	FD	Points	Places	Rank
Stefania Bertele; Walter Cecconi	16	17	166.22	140	16
Isabella Rizzi; Luigi Freroni	17	14	168.64	133	14
Matilde Ciccia; Lamberto Ceserani	7	6	191.46	58.5	6

== Luge ==
Men

Athlete	Run 1		Run 2		Run 3		Run 4		Total	
Athlete	Time	Rank	Time	Rank	Time	Rank	Time	Rank	Time	Rank
Paul Hildgartner	n/a	?	n/a	?	n/a	?	DNF	–	DNF	–
Peter Gschnitzer	54.051	14	53.812	17	53.357	16	1:27.540	38	4:08.760	37
Karl Brunner	53.916	12	53.228	10	53.023	11	53.21	10	3:33.188	11

(Men's) Doubles

Athletes	Run 1		Run 2		Total	
Athletes	Time	Rank	Time	Rank	Time	Rank
Karl Feichter; Ernst Haspinger	43.853	12	43.318	5	1:27.121	7
Paul Hildgartner; Walter Plaikner	43.781	11	44.058	12	1:27.839	11

Women

Athlete	Run 1		Run 2		Run 3		Run 4		Total	
Athlete	Time	Rank	Time	Rank	Time	Rank	Time	Rank	Time	Rank
Maria-Luise Rainer	44.943	16	44.848	16	44.768	16	44.972	17	2:59.531	16
Sarah Felder	44.056	12	43.118	11	43.075	10	43.374	10	2:53.623	11

== Nordic combined ==
Events:

- normal hill ski jumping (Three jumps, best two counted and shown here.)
- 15 km cross-country skiing

Athlete	Event	Ski Jumping				Cross-country			Total	
Athlete	Event	Distance 1	Distance 2	Points	Rank	Time	Points	Rank	Points	Rank
Modesto De Silvestro	Individual	60.5	62.0	139.8	33	52:27.61	180.09	25	319.89	32
Francesco Giacomelli	Individual	72.0	74.0	190.3	20	56:08.75	146.92	31	337.22	31

== Ski jumping ==
Athlete	Event	Jump 1		Jump 2		Total	
Athlete	Event	Distance	Points	Distance	Points	Points	Rank
Leo De Crignis	Normal hill	70.5	91.1	74.0	99.7	190.8	50
Francesco Giacomelli	Normal hill	71.0	94.9	72.0	97.0	191.9	49
Lido Tomasi	Normal hill	76.0	101.4	76.0	101.9	203.3	45
Marcello Bazzana	Normal hill	75.0	103.8	74.5	102.0	205.8	38
Leo De Crignis	Large hill	76.0	71.4	76.0	71.9	143.3	49
Marcello Bazzana	Large hill	74.0	72.1	71.0	65.9	138.0	51
Lido Tomasi	Large hill	82.0	80.8	77.0	71.3	152.1	47
Francesco Giacomelli	Large hill	81.0	83.4	75.5	74.2	157.6	44

== Speed skating ==
Men

Event	Athlete	Race	
Event	Athlete	Time	Rank
500 m	Bruno Toniolli	41.44	23
1000 m	Floriano Martello	1:26.54	26
1000 m	Bruno Toniolli	1:22.83	14
1500 m	Giovanni Panciera	2:33.52	30
1500 m	Floriano Martello	2:09.68	25
1500 m	Bruno Toniolli	2:05.66	19
5000 m	Loris Vellar	8:31.85	31
5000 m	Ivano Bamberghi	8:21.04	28
5000 m	Maurizio Marchetto	8:04.07	21
10,000 m	Maurizio Marchetto	16:22.55	17

== See also ==
- Italy at the FIS Alpine World Ski Championships 1976
