= Ski jumping at the 1976 Winter Olympics =

Ski jumping at the XII Olympic Winter Games
- Pictogram for ski jumping
- Venue: Bergiselschanze (large hill) & Seefeld (normal hill)
- Dates: 7–15 February 1976
- Competitors: 62 from 15 nations

Ski jumping at the 1976 Winter Olympics consisted of two events held from 7 to 15 February, with the large hill event taking place at Bergiselschanze, and the normal hill event at Seefeld.

== Medal summary ==
=== Medal table ===
Rank	Nation	Gold	Silver	Bronze	Total
1	Austria	1	1	1	3
1	East Germany	1	1	1	3
Totals (2 entries)		2	2	2	6

Austria and East Germany split the six medals evenly.

=== Events ===
Event	Gold		Silver		Bronze	
Normal hill	Hans-Georg Aschenbach; East Germany	252.0	Jochen Danneberg; East Germany	246.2	Karl Schnabl; Austria	242.0
Large hill	Karl Schnabl; Austria	234.8	Toni Innauer; Austria	232.9	Henry Glaß; East Germany	221.7

== Participating NOCs ==
Fifteen nations participated in ski jumping at the Innsbruck Games.

- Austria (5)
- Canada (4)
- Finland (4)
- West Germany (2)
- East Germany (4)
- Italy (4)
- Japan (5)
- Norway (4)
- Poland (5)
- Switzerland (4)
- Sweden (2)
- Czechoslovakia (5)
- Soviet Union (4)
- United States (6)
- Yugoslavia (4)
