= Kakuta =

Kakuta is a surname. Notable people with the surname include:

- Gaël Kakuta (born 1991), French footballer
- Kakuji Kakuta (1890–1944), Japanese admiral during World War II
- Koji Kakuta (角田 幸司, born 1951), Japanese ski jumper
- Teruo Kakuta, Japanese manga artist
