= Vladimir Andreyev (skier) =

Soviet alpine skier (born 1958)

Personal information
- Born: 9 February 1958 (age 68) Dolgoprudny, Russian SSR, USSR
- Height: 183 cm (6 ft 0 in)
- Weight: 77 kg (170 lb)

Sport
- Sport: Alpine skiing

Vladimir Mikhailovich Andreyev (Russian: Владимир Михайлович Андреев, also spelled Andreev, born 9 February 1958) is a retired Soviet alpine skier.

== Career ==
He raced in the Alpine Skiing World Cup from 1979 to 1984. His highest placing in a single race was second, in the January 1981 slalom race in Kitzbühel. In the overall standings he placed 20th in 1981.

He competed twice at the FIS World Ski Championships, placing fourth in combined in Garmisch-Partenkirchen 1978 and tenth in slalom in Schladming 1982. He also competed in the slalom and giant slalom at the 1976, 1980 and 1984 Winter Olympics with the best achievement of ninth place in the slalom in 1980. At the 1976 Games he and Alla Askarova were the sole representatives of the Soviet Union in alpine skiing. He retired after the 1984 Olympics to become the head coach of the national team.

He is married to Nadezhda Andreyeva, a fellow Olympian and coach. They live in Moscow Oblast and have a son, Vladimir (b. 1983), and a daughter, Maria (b. 1993).
