= Minoru Wakasa =

Japanese ski jumper

Personal information
- Nationality: Japanese
- Born: 8 July 1951 (age 73); Hokkaido, Japan

Sport
- Sport: Ski jumping

Minoru Wakasa (若狭 実, Wakasa Minoru, born 8 July 1951) is a Japanese ski jumper. He competed in the large hill event at the 1976 Winter Olympics.
