= The Great Ecstasy of Woodcarver Steiner =

1974 film

- Film poster
- Written by: Werner Herzog
- Directed by: Werner Herzog
- Starring: Walter Steiner; Werner Herzog
- Narrated by: Werner Herzog
- Music by: Popol Vuh
- Country of origin: West Germany
- Original languages: German; English

Production
- Producer: Werner Herzog
- Cinematography: Jörg Schmidt-Reitwein
- Editor: Beate Mainka-Jellinghaus
- Running time: 45 minutes
- Production companies: Werner Herzog Filmproduktion; Süddeutscher Rundfunk (SDR)
- Budget: DEM 72.000 (estimated)

Original release
- Release: 1974

The Great Ecstasy of Woodcarver Steiner (German: Die große Ekstase des Bildschnitzers Steiner) is a 1974 documentary film by German filmmaker Werner Herzog. It is about Walter Steiner, a celebrated ski jumper of his era who worked as a carpenter for his full-time occupation. Showcased is Steiner's quest for a world record in ski flying, as well as the dangers involved in the sport. Herzog has considered it one of his "most important films."

== Production ==
The Great Ecstasy of Woodcarver Steiner shows Steiner at training, preparations and competitions but also at his work as a woodcarver and during ice fishing.

The film includes footage shot in the German towns of Oberstdorf and Garmisch-Partenkirchen, as well as Planica 1974 competition in Yugoslavia (now Slovenia), Bad Aussee in Austria and in Steiner's Swiss home. The film was made as part of a series for a German television station, which restricted in some ways the content. Herzog's original cut was 60 minutes long, but it was edited down to 45 minutes to fit in a one-hour television spot. The station also required Herzog himself to appear on camera, which he had not typically done in his previous documentaries.

During the movie Steiner often expresses his fascination for flying in general, but also the insecurity of ski flying. Especially at the International Ski Flying Week in Planica 1974, where the Swiss seriously crashes after the second jump, he constantly criticizes the jury for choosing a too long distance along the in-run and expecting too much from him. He also calles their behavior a "scandal". Steiner later voluntarily chooses a shorter distance for the in-run. Nevertheless he wins the competition and closes with the sarcastic remark, that the "Yugoslavs are hopefully satisfied".

The film ends with a quotation from the short story "Helblings Geschichte" by Robert Walser, altered to replace Helbing with Steiner.

== See also ==
- Ski flying
- List of longest ski jumps
