= Ivo Zupan =

Slovenian ski jumper

Personal information
- Nationality: Slovenian
- Born: 1 August 1956 (age 68); Jesenice, Yugoslavia

Sport
- Sport: Ski jumping

Ivo Zupan (born 1 August 1956) is a Slovenian ski jumper. He competed in the normal hill and large hill events at the 1976 Winter Olympics.
