= Janusz Waluś (ski jumper) =

Polish ski jumper

Personal information
- Nationality: Polish
- Born: 3 November 1953 (age 71); Wrocław, Poland

Sport
- Sport: Ski jumping

Janusz Waluś (born 3 November 1953) is a Polish ski jumper. He competed in the normal hill and large hill events at the 1976 Winter Olympics.
