= Ulrico Kostner =

Italian cross-country skier

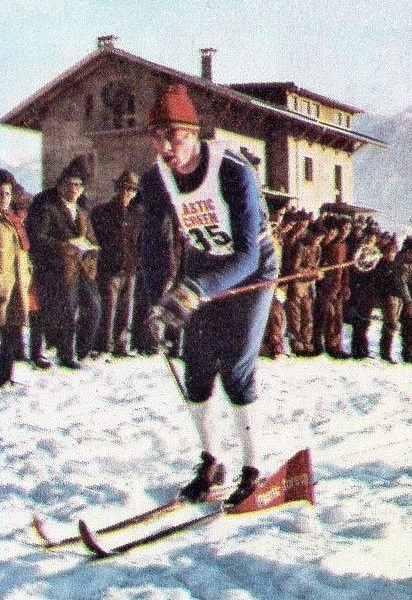
- Ulrico Kostner c. 1969

Personal information
- Born: 1 January 1946 (age 80) Ortisei, Italy
- Height: 1.80 m (5 ft 11 in)
- Weight: 69 kg (152 lb)

Sport
- Sport: Cross-country skiing

Ulrico Kostner (born 31 January 1946) is a retired Italian cross-country skier. He competed at the 1972 and 1976 Olympics in the 30 km, 50 km and 4×10 km relay with the best achievement of seventh place in the relay in 1976.
