= Francesco Giacomelli =

Italian ski jumper (born 1957)

Personal information
- Nationality: Italian
- Born: 16 April 1957 (age 67); Predazzo, Italy

Sport
- Sport: Ski jumping

Francesco Giacomelli (born 16 April 1957) is an Italian ski jumper. He competed in the normal hill and large hill events at the 1976 Winter Olympics.
