= Viktor Varlamov =

Russian speed skater

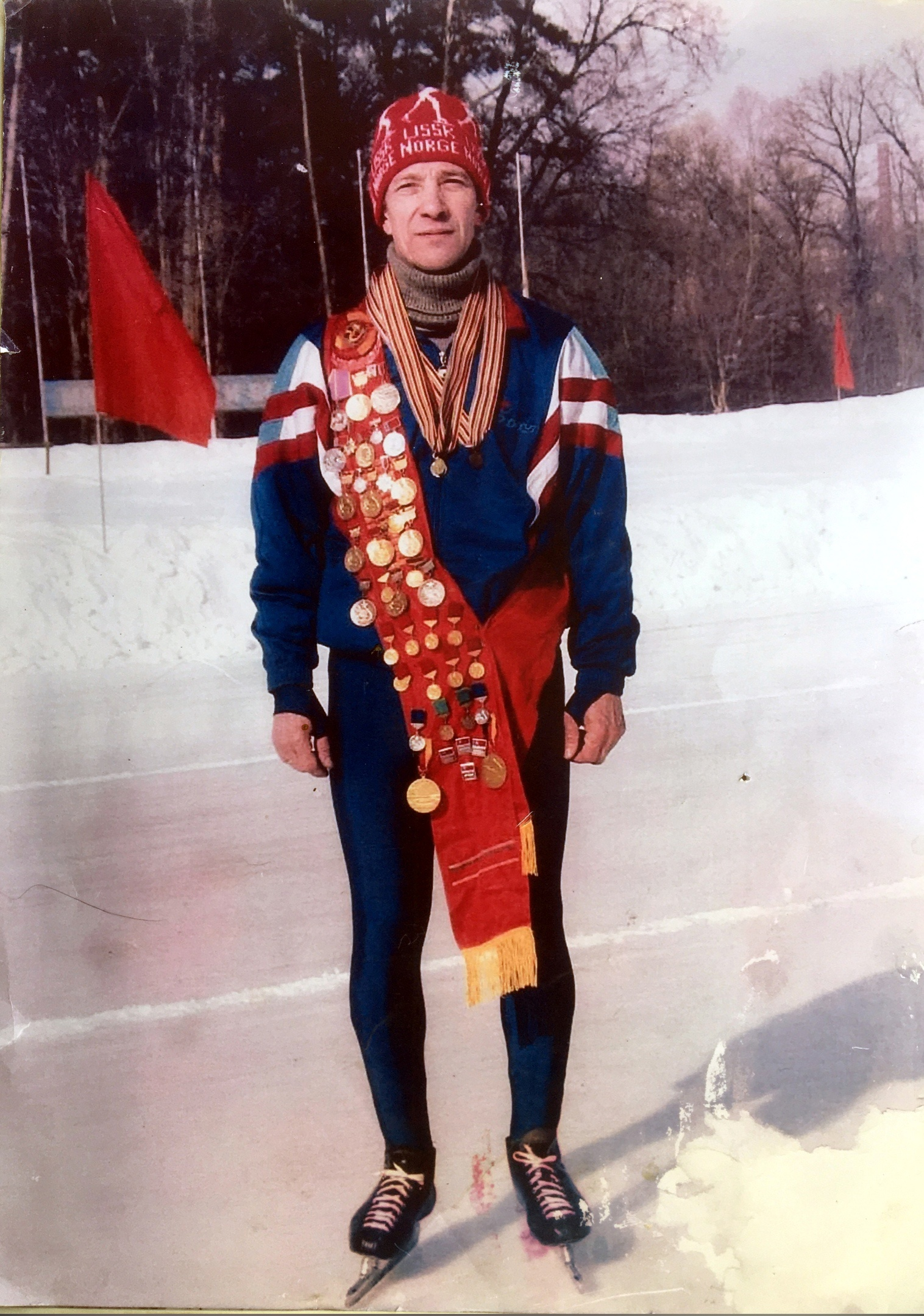

Personal information
- Nationality: Soviet
- Born: 28 April 1948 (age 78) Petropavl, Kazakh SSR, Soviet Union

Sport
- Sport: Speed skating

Viktor Ivanovich Varlamov Russian: Виктор Инавович Варламов; born 28 April 1948 in Petropavl) is a former Soviet speedskater.

He competed at the 1976 Winter Olympics, where he placed fourth in both 5,000 and 10,000 metres.

== World records ==
He set during his career one world record.

Discipline	Time	Date	Location
10,000 m	14:52.73	25 March 1975	(Soviet Union) Alma-Ata

Source: SpeedSkatingStats.com
