= Floriano Martello =

Italian speed skater

Personal information
- Nationality: Italian
- Born: 1 February 1952 (age 74) Roana, Italy

Sport
- Sport: Speed skating

Floriano Martello (born 1 February 1952) is an Italian speed skater. He competed in two events at the 1976 Winter Olympics.
