= Břetislav Novák =

- Born: 2 March 1938; Pardubice, Czechoslovakia
- Died: 18 August 2003 (aged 65); Prague, Czech Republic
- Alma mater: Charles University
- Known for: Lattice points in multidimensional ellipsoids; "Novák numbers"
- Scientific career
- Fields: Mathematics
- Workplaces: Charles University
- Doctoral advisor: Vojtěch Jarník

Břetislav Novák (2 March 1938 – 18 August 2003) was a Czech mathematician who worked in number theory, particularly analytic number theory. He spent his whole career at the Faculty of Mathematics and Physics of Charles University in Prague, where he was a student and later a colleague of Vojtěch Jarník. He is best known for his work on lattice points in multidimensional ellipsoids and for the "Novák numbers", integers n that divide 2^{n} + 1.

== Life and education ==
Novák was born in Pardubice and grew up in nearby Chrudim, where he attended primary school (1944–1949) and secondary school (1949–1956). He took part in the Mathematical Olympiads as a student, placing sixth in the national round in 1955 and winning the competition outright in 1956.

From 1956 to 1961 he studied mathematics at the Faculty of Mathematics and Physics of Charles University. There he became a student of Vojtěch Jarník, who supervised his diploma and CSc. theses. Novák graduated in 1961 cum laude and, under Jarník's influence, decided to devote his career to number theory.

He received the degrees RNDr. and CSc. (equivalent to a PhD) in 1967, became a docent (associate professor) in 1972, received the DrSc. in 1980, and was appointed full professor in 1982.

== Career ==
Novák remained at Charles University throughout his career. He was a half-time tutor while still a student (1959–1961), then a tutor (1961–1964) and a lecturer (1964–1972). After his habilitation he became an associate professor in 1972, and in 1982 he was appointed full professor of mathematical analysis, a post he held until his death.

He spent the winter term of 1962/63 at Moscow State University and that of 1972/73 at the University of Illinois at Urbana–Champaign.

=== Administrative and professional activities ===
Novák headed the Department of Mathematical Analysis from 1971 to 1990 and was vice-dean of the faculty in 1973–1976 and 1980–1989. He joined the Union of Czechoslovak Mathematicians and Physicists in 1956, was elected to its Central Committee in 1978, and served as its chairman from 1987 to 1990 and as chairman of its Mathematical Section from 1993 to 1996. The Union awarded him its first-degree award, named him a distinguished member in 1981 and an honorary member in 1993. He also sat on the Scientific Board of the Czech Technical University in Prague (1977–1979), the Scientific Board for Mathematics of the Czechoslovak Academy of Sciences (1977–1990) and the National Committee for Mathematics (from 1977), and had been a member of the Society for the History of Sciences and Technology since 1966.

=== Teaching ===
Novák co-authored several textbooks for secondary-school mathematics. His 1972 lecture notes on number theory, Vybrané partie z teorie čísel ("Selected Chapters from Number Theory"), remained, three decades after their publication, the only Czech-language source for some important techniques of classical analytic number theory.

== Research ==
Novák's interests within mathematics were broad, with a preference for complex analysis and its applications, but number theory became his main subject. His first two papers, published while he was still at school, concerned polynomials with integer coefficients that take only values of the form 6m ± 1.

=== Lattice points in ellipsoids ===
Influenced by Jarník, Novák studied lattice points in multidimensional ellipsoids from the start of his university career. His aim was to find precise asymptotic estimates for the "generalized lattice residue": the difference between the weighted number of lattice points in an n-dimensional ellipsoid and its volume. A central difficulty is the sharp difference between rational and irrational ellipsoids. The first significant result for irrational ellipsoids was proved by Arnold Walfisz in 1927, and Jarník developed the theory further in a series of papers starting in 1928. Novák mastered Jarník's methods, and his work around 1968 on lattice points with weights opened the way to a definitive analysis of the influence of weights. A more detailed account of the history of the problem is given in Fricker's monograph.

In the setting of his 1963 paper, let Q be a positive definite integral quadratic form in r > 4 variables. Let A(x) be a sum of exponential terms, with parameters α_{1}, …, α_{r}, over the integer points satisfying Q ≤ x and given congruence conditions. Let I(x) be its main term and R(x) = A(x) − I(x) the remainder. Novák proved, partly during his stay in Moscow, that:

- for all parameter systems, $R(x) = O(x^{r/2-1})$;
- if at least one α_{i} is irrational, then $R(x) = o(x^{r/2-1})$, and this estimate cannot be improved;
- for any function φ(x) > 0 tending to 0, there is a parameter system for which the o-estimate holds and also $R(x) = \Omega(x^{r/2-1}\varphi(x))$;
- for almost all parameter systems (with respect to Lebesgue measure), $R(x) = O\left(x^{r/4}\log^{2r+1+\varepsilon} x\right)$ for every ε > 0.

These results appeared in Doklady Akademii Nauk SSSR in 1963, with publication recommended by Andrey Kolmogorov. Novák reviewed his results and listed open problems at the 1981 Moscow conference on analytic methods in number theory, held for the 90th birthday of Ivan Matveyevich Vinogradov.

=== Other work ===
In 1997, Novák and Anatolii Karatsuba studied integers with an even or odd number of 1s in their binary representation. Novák proved results on the distribution of such numbers in short arithmetic progressions, on the distribution of quadratic residues and non-residues modulo increasing primes within such sets, and on the distribution of primitive roots and indices among them. Some of these results were published in Matematicheskie Zametki in 1999.

=== Novák numbers ===
In his last years, Novák studied a question inspired by a problem from the 1990 International Mathematical Olympiad (Beijing, 1990): determine all integers n > 1 such that n^{2} divides 2^{n} + 1. The only solution is n = 3. Novák investigated the properties and distribution of all integers n dividing 2^{n} + 1. These later came to be called "Novák numbers" in Russia, and the set of them is denoted NB.

Numbers of this kind appeared again at the 2000 International Mathematical Olympiad (2000), where Problem 5 asked whether there exists a positive integer n with exactly 2000 distinct prime divisors such that n divides 2^{n} + 1, that is, whether a Novák number with exactly 2000 prime divisors exists.

If NB(x) counts the Novák numbers not exceeding x, Novák proved several results on its asymptotic behaviour in an unpublished manuscript. Using a computer, he found the first million such numbers and conjectured that $NB(x) = O(x^{\varepsilon})$ for every ε > 0. As of 2026, the conjecture was unproved.

Novák numbers can be viewed as an analogue of pseudoprimes to base 2. There are infinitely many of them: 3 is a Novák number, the set is closed under products, gcd and lcm, so every power of 3 is one, and if N is a Novák number then so is 2^{N} + 1. Alexander Kalmynin later proved new lower bounds for NB(x) and, assuming the generalized Riemann hypothesis, upper estimates for the number of primes dividing at least one Novák number. He also described the prime factors of Novák numbers N for which 2N is a "Novák–Carmichael number".

== Selected publications ==
- Novák, B. (1963). "Celye tochki v mnogomernych ellipsoidach". Doklady Akademii Nauk SSSR. 153: 762–764. English translation: Soviet Mathematics Doklady 4 (1963), 1746–1749.
- Novák, B. (1968). "Verallgemeinerung eines Peterssonschen Satzes und Gitterpunkte mit Gewichten". Acta Arithmetica. 13: 423–454.
- Novák, B. (1976). "On lattice points in multidimensional ellipsoids: problems of centers". Journal of Number Theory. 8: 12–39.
- Karatsuba, A. A.; Novák, B. (1999). "Arifmeticheskie zadachi s chislami special'nogo vida". Matematicheskie Zametki. 66: 315–317.
- Novák, B. (1972). Vybrané partie z teorie čísel. Prague: SPN.
