= Edi Federer =

Austrian ski jumper

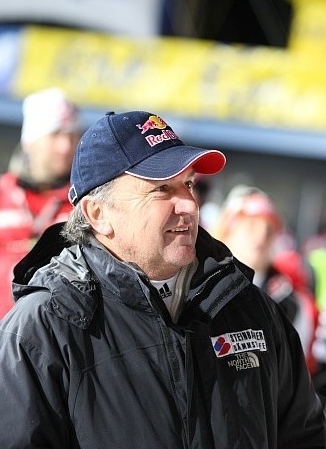
Edi Federer during FIS Ski Jumping World Cup in Zakopane in 2008

Eduard "Edi" Federer (20 February 1955 in Mühlbach am Hochkönig– 30 May 2012 in Pfarrwerfen) was an Austrian ski jumper. At the Four Hills Tournament 1974–75 he finished second.
