= Ezio Fiori =

Italian bobsledder (born 1949)

Personal information
- Nationality: Italian
- Born: 25 October 1949 (age 76) Calalzo di Cadore, Italy

Sport
- Sport: Bobsleigh

Ezio Fiori (born 25 October 1949) is an Italian bobsleigher. He competed in the two man and the four man events at the 1976 Winter Olympics.
