= Marcello Bazzana =

Italian ski jumper

Personal information
- Nationality: Italian
- Born: 4 July 1953; Temù, Italy
- Died: 17 January 2011 (aged 57)

Sport
- Sport: Ski jumping

Marcello Bazzana (4 July 1953 – 17 January 2011) was an Italian ski jumper. He competed in the normal hill and large hill events at the 1976 Winter Olympics.
