= Andrey Malikov =

Soviet speed skater

Personal information
- Nationality: Soviet
- Born: 7 May 1954 (age 70)

Sport
- Sport: Speed skating

Andrey Malikov (born 7 May 1954) is a Soviet speed skater. He competed in two events at the 1976 Winter Olympics.
