= Ivo Felix =

Czech ski jumper

Personal information
- Nationality: Czech
- Born: 4 December 1955 (age 69); Jilemnice, Czechoslovakia

Sport
- Sport: Ski jumping

Ivo Felix (born 4 December 1955) is a Czech ski jumper. He competed in the normal hill event at the 1976 Winter Olympics.
