= Takao Ito =

Japanese ski jumper

Takao Itō
Personal information
- Full name: 伊藤 高男
- Born: 5 November 1952 (age 73) Hokkaido, Japan

Sport
- Country: Japan
- Sport: Skiing

World Cup career
- Seasons: 1980
- Indiv. starts: 1

Takao Ito (伊藤 高男, Itō Takao; born 5 November 1952) is a Japanese former ski jumper. He competed in the normal hill and large hill events at the 1976 Winter Olympics.

== Career ==
On 8 March 1973, at the official training of the 2nd FIS Ski Flying World Championships, he crashed at ski jumping world record distance at 176 metres (577 ft) on Heini-Klopfer-Skiflugschanze in Oberstdorf, West Germany.

He performed in World Cup only one time in his career, in the inaugural season at home in Sapporo where he took 9th place and three times at Four Hills Tournament with no visible success.

== World Cup ==
=== Standings ===
Season	Overall	4H
1973/74	N/A	92
1974/75	N/A	42
1976/77	N/A	47
1979/80	80	—

== Invalid ski jumping world record ==
Date	Hill	Location	Metres	Feet
8 March 1973	Heini-Klopfer-Skiflugschanze	Oberstdorf, West Germany	176	577

*Not recognized. Crashed at world record distance.
