= Aleksandr Karapuzov =

Soviet ski jumper

Personal information
- Nationality: Soviet
- Born: 3 September 1955 (age 69)

Sport
- Sport: Ski jumping

Aleksandr Karapuzov (born 3 September 1955) is a Soviet ski jumper. He competed in the normal hill and large hill events at the 1976 Winter Olympics.
