= Yuji Katsuro =

Personal information
- Born: October 7, 1949 (age 77) Hokkaido, Japan
- Height: 164 cm (5 ft 5 in)
- Weight: 63 kg (139 lb)

Sport
- Sport: Ski jumping
- Club: Nippon Light Metal; Tokyo Biso

Yuji Katsuro (勝呂 裕司, Katsuro Yūji; born October 7, 1949) is a retired Japanese Nordic combined skier. He competed at the 1972 and 1976 Winter Olympics and placed fifth and 21st, respectively.

After retiring from competitions Katsuro was offered a job as a coach affiliated with his company. He refused and tried to become an independent coach, but failed, and later took odd jobs at bars and golf courses.
