= Harri Blumén =

Finnish ski jumper

Personal information
- Nationality: Finnish
- Born: 4 February 1958 (age 67); Lahti, Finland

Sport
- Sport: Ski jumping

Harri Blumén (born 4 February 1958) is a Finnish ski jumper. He competed in the normal hill and large hill events at the 1976 Winter Olympics.
