= Koji Kakuta =

Japanese ski jumper

Personal information
- Nationality: Japanese
- Born: 11 October 1951 (age 73); Hokkaido, Japan

Sport
- Sport: Ski jumping

Koji Kakuta (角田 幸司, Kakuta Kōji, born 11 October 1951) is a Japanese ski jumper. He competed in the normal hill event at the 1976 Winter Olympics.
