= Alla Askarova =

Russian alpine skier (born 1954)

Personal information
- Born: 25 March 1954 (age 72)
- Height: 1.62 m (5 ft 4 in)
- Weight: 58 kg (128 lb)

Sport
- Sport: Alpine skiing
Medal record
Representing the Soviet Union
Winter Universiade
Gold medal – first place	1975 Livigno	Slalom

Alevtina "Alla" Askarova (Russian: Алевтина "Алла" Аскарова; born 25 March 1954) is a Russian former alpine skier. She competed in the 1976 Winter Olympics in the slalom, giant slalom and downhill, with the best achievement of 28th place in the downhill event.

In 1975, she won a gold medal in the slalom at the Winter Universiade, which remains the only gold medal for Russia or Soviet Union in this event at these competitions.
