= Leo De Crignis =

Italian ski jumper (born 1952)

Personal information
- Nationality: Italian
- Born: 12 July 1952 (age 73) Udine, Italy

Sport
- Sport: Ski jumping

Leo De Crignis (born 12 July 1952) is an Italian ski jumper. He competed in the normal hill and large hill events at the 1976 Winter Olympics.
