= Thomas Lundgren =

Swedish ski jumper (born 1956)

Personal information
- Nationality: Swedish
- Born: 25 October 1956 (age 69) Örnsköldsvik, Sweden

Sport
- Sport: Ski jumping

Thomas Lundgren (born 25 October 1956) is a Swedish ski jumper. He competed in the normal hill event at the 1976 Winter Olympics.
