= Jaroslav Balcar =

Czech ski jumper

Personal information
- Born: 27 March 1953; Vrchlabí, Czechoslovakia
- Died: 4 April 2015 (aged 62)
- Height: 1.81 m (5 ft 11 in)
- Weight: 81 kg (179 lb)

Sport
- Country: Czechoslovakia
- Sport: Ski jumping

Jaroslav Balcar (27 March 1953 – 4 April 2015) was a Czechoslovak ski jumper who competed at the 1976 Winter Olympics.

== Career ==
His international debut was at the Four Hills Tournament in 1975/76 season; his older brother Jindřich Balcar was also active as a ski jumper. After a 33rd place in Oberstdorf and a 40th place in Garmisch-Partenkirchen, he reached 23rd Place at Innsbruck. After a disappointing 60th place in Bischofshofen, he was 39th place of the overall tourstandings. At the 1976 Winter Olympic Games in Innsbruck, he raced in two individual disciplines. He jumped the normal hill in fourth place and thus missed a medal by only one place. For the large hill at the end he was ranked 14th. Following the good results in the Games, Balcar started at the Four Hills Tournament 1976/77 season; however, except for achieving 15th place in Bischofshofen, he did not jump into the top 20 on this tour. Finally, Balcar reached 742.2 points, Rank 30, and this was his last tour. He died in 2015.
