= Willi Pürstl =

Austrian ski jumper

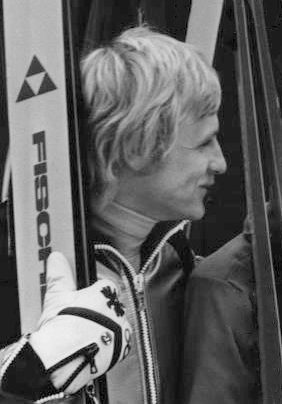
- Pürstl in 1976

Personal information
- Born: 10 January 1955 (age 71) Schöder, Austria

Sport
- Sport: Ski jumping

Willi Pürstl (born 10 January 1955) is an Austrian former ski jumper who competed from 1973 to 1981. He won the overall Four Hills Tournament in 1974–75.

In 1988 Pürstl immigrated to Canada, where he had a long career as a ski jumping coach, journalist, TV presenter, producer, editor and cameraman.
