= Sergey Saychik =

Soviet ski jumper

Personal information
- Nationality: Soviet
- Born: 26 February 1957 Perm, Russian SFSR, Soviet Union
- Died: 5 October 2000 (aged 43) Saint Petersburg, Russia

Sport
- Sport: Ski jumping

Sergey Saychik (Сергей Евгеньевич Сайчик, 26 February 1957 – 5 October 2000) was a Soviet ski jumper. He competed in the normal hill and large hill events at the 1976 Winter Olympics.
