= Kim Fripp =

Canadian ski jumper (1952–2023)

Personal information
- Full name: Peter Kemp Fripp
- Born: 31 October 1952 Ottawa, Ontario, Canada
- Died: 16 February 2023 (aged 70) Florida, U.S.

Sport
- Sport: Ski jumping

Kim Fripp (31 October 1952 – 16 February 2023) was a Canadian ski jumper who competed in the 1976 Winter Olympics.

Fripp died in Florida on 16 February 2023 at the age of 70.
