= Donald Grady =

Canadian ski jumper (born 1951)

Donald Grady (born 11 June 1951) is a Canadian former ski jumper who competed in the 1976 Winter Olympics.
