= Bernd Eckstein =

East German ski jumper

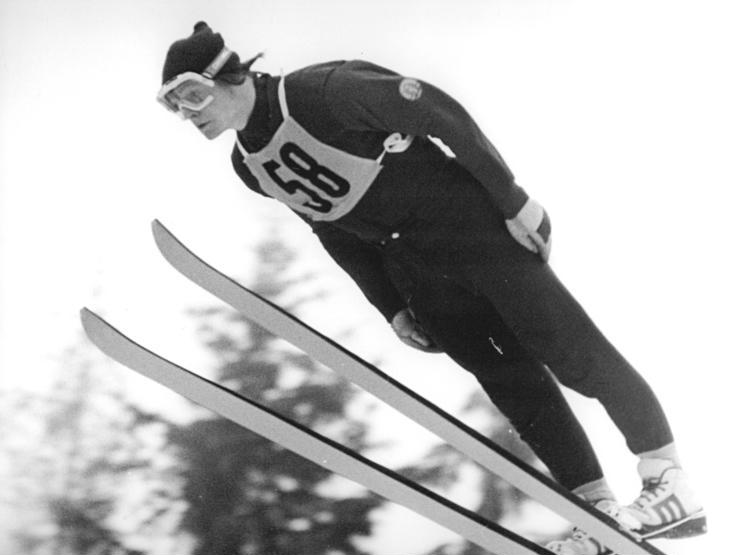
Bernd Eckstein

Bernd Eckstein (born 22 May 1953 in Mengersgereuth-Hämmern) was an East German ski jumper who competed during the 1970s. He finished seventh in the individual large hill event at the 1976 Winter Olympics in Innsbruck.

Eckstein also finished fifth in the individual large hill at the 1974 FIS Nordic World Ski Championships in Falun. His lone career victory was in an individual normal hill event in Austria in 1974.
