= Janez Demšar =

Slovenian ski jumper

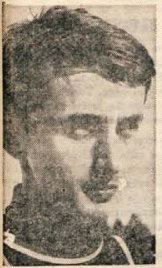
- Janez Demšar in 1968

Personal information
- Nationality: Slovenian
- Born: 25 February 1951 (age 74); Jesenice, Yugoslavia

Sport
- Sport: Ski jumping

Janez Demšar (born 25 February 1951) is a Slovenian ski jumper. He competed in the normal hill and large hill events at the 1976 Winter Olympics.
