= Jim Denney (ski jumper born 1957) =

American former ski jumper

Jim Denney (born 10 June 1957) is an American former ski jumper. During his active years, he won the US ski jumping championship in 1976 and 1980, competed in the 1976 Winter Olympics, the 1980 Winter Olympics, the 1978 World championships and won the World Cup normal hill event that year in Lahti, Finland. His hill record of 97.5 m., set at the now defunct Papoose Peak hill venue in Squaw Valley remains the last one recorded for the former Olympic ski jumping installation.
