= Odd Brandsegg =

Swedish ski jumper

Odd Arne Brandsegg (born 19 July 1948 in Målselv) is a Swedish former ski jumper who represented Njurunda IK.

He took part in the German-Austrian Jumping Tournament from 1974 to 1977, and came joint 25th in 1975/76. His best single result was 15th in Oberstdorf on 30 December 1976.

He took part in the World Championships in 1974 and 1978. His best placing came in Lahti in 1978, where he came 26th in the large hill, 29th in the normal hill, and was sixth in the Swedish team (out of ten) in the team competition. At the 1976 Olympic Games, he was 25th on the large hill, and 41st on the normal hill. He was 22nd at the ski-flying World Championships in Vikersund in 1977.

Odd Brandsegg was Swedish champion three times. He won the championships in the normal hill in 1976, and both normal and large hill in 1977.
