= Dietrich Kampf =

East German ski jumper

Medal record

Men's ski jumping

Representing East Germany

World Championships
Silver medal – second place	1974 Falun	Individual normal hill

Dietrich Kampf (born 3 April 1953) is an East German former ski jumper who competed from 1972 to 1976. He won the silver medal in the individual normal hill event at the 1974 FIS Nordic World Ski Championships in Falun.

Kampf also finished second one additional time in the individual normal hill at Garmisch-Partenkirchen in 1973. He also finished fourth in the FIS Ski-Flying World Championships 1973.

Kampf was born in Oberwiesenthal. He is currently a coach.
