= Jindřich Balcar =

Czech ski jumper

Jindřich Balcar (22 March 1950, Jablonec nad Nisou – 21 November 2013, Liberec) was a Czech ski jumper who competed for Czechoslovakia from 1974 to 1976. He finished 27th in the individual normal hill event at the 1976 Winter Olympics in Innsbruck which was also his best career finish.
