= Finn Halvorsen =

Norwegian former ski jumper (born 1947)

Personal information
- Born: 21 February 1947 (age 78); Våler, Hedmark, Norway

Sport
- Sport: Ski jumping

Finn Halvorsen (born 21 February 1947) is a Norwegian former ski jumper. He was born in Våler Municipality in Hedmark county. He competed at the 1976 Winter Olympics in Innsbruck, in normal hill and large hill.
