= Adam Krzysztofiak =

Polish ski jumper

Personal information
- Born: 21 January 1951; Zakopane, Poland
- Died: 16 January 2008 (aged 56); Zakopane, Poland
- Height: 178 cm (5 ft 10 in)
- Weight: 72 kg (159 lb)

Sport
- Sport: Ski jumping
- Club: Legia Zakopane / SN PTT Zakopane

Adam Krzysztofiak (21 January 1951 – 16 January 2008) was a Polish ski jumper. He competed at the 1972 Winter Olympics and the 1976 Winter Olympics.
