= Peter Wilson (ski jumper) =

Canadian ski jumper

Peter Wilson (born October 22, 1952, in Ottawa, Ontario) was a Canadian ski jumper who competed internationally from 1971 to 1976. Peter competed in the 1972 Winter Olympics at Sapporo and 1976 Winter Olympics in Innsbruck and the 1972 Planica and 1973 Oberstdorf World Ski Flying Championships, and the 1974 FIS World Nordic Ski Championships in Falun. He also rowed for the Ottawa Rowing Club and won at the Royal Canadian Henley in the 145 lb. fours with (1972) and without coxswain (1973).
