= Ernst von Grünigen =

Swiss ski jumper

Ernst von Grünigen (born 23 March 1950 – June 1992) was a Swiss ski jumper who competed from 1971 to 1977. He finished fifth in the individual normal hill event at the 1976 Winter Olympics in Innsbruck which was also his best career finish.
