= Greg Windsperger =

American ski jumper

Greg Windsperger (born December 30, 1951, in Minneapolis) is an American former ski jumper who competed in the 1976 Winter Olympics.
