= Lido Tomasi =

Italian ski jumper

Personal information
- Nationality: Italian
- Born: 17 November 1955 (age 69); Vione, Italy

Sport
- Sport: Ski jumping

Lido Tomasi (born 17 November 1955) is an Italian ski jumper. He competed at the 1976 Winter Olympics, the 1980 Winter Olympics and the 1984 Winter Olympics.
