= Hans-Georg Aschenbach =

East German ski jumper (born 1951)

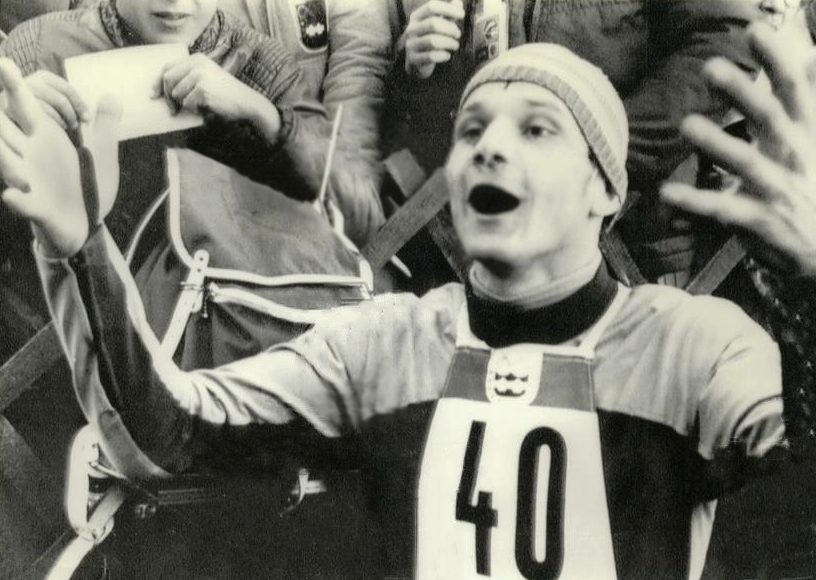
- Aschenbach after winning the gold medal at the 1976 Olympics

Personal information
- Born: 20 October 1951 (age 74) Brotterode, East Germany
- Height: 175 cm (5 ft 9 in)
- Weight: 69 kg (152 lb)

Sport
- Sport: Ski jumping
- Club: ASK Vorwärts Oberhof
Medal record
Representing East Germany
Olympic Games
Gold medal – first place	1976 Innsbruck	Individual normal hill
World Championships
Gold medal – first place	1974 Falun	Individual normal hill
Gold medal – first place	1974 Falun	Individual large hill
Gold medal – first place	1976 Innsbruck	Individual normal hill
Ski Flying World Championships
Gold medal – first place	1973 Oberstdorf	Ski flying

Hans-Georg Aschenbach (born 20 October 1951) is a former ski jumper who represented East Germany.

In 1969 he became junior world champion, and two years later won his first national title. He won the FIS Ski Flying World Championships in 1973. In 1974 he won the Four Hills Tournament, and both ski jumping events at the FIS Nordic World Ski Championships in Falun. Owing to these achievements he was named the East German sportspersonality of the year. He sat out most of 1975 due to a knee injury, but recovered by the 1976 Winter Olympics, where he took the gold medal in the individual normal hill event.

Aschenbach retired right after the Olympics to work as a military and sports doctor. In 1988, while serving as the physician of the East German ski jumping team, he defected into West Germany, where he worked as an orthopedic surgeon.

Awards
Preceded by Roland Matthes	East German Sportsman of the Year; 1974	Succeeded by Roland Matthes
