= Richard Grady =

Canadian ski jumper (born 1955)

Richard Grady (born 28 April 1955) is a Canadian former ski jumper who competed in the 1976 Winter Olympics.
