= Karl Schnabl =

Austrian ski jumper

Medal record

Men's ski jumping

Olympic Games
Gold medal – first place	1976 Innsbruck	Individual large hill
Bronze medal – third place	1976 Innsbruck	Individual normal hill

World Championships
Gold medal – first place	1976 Innsbruck	Individual large hill
Bronze medal – third place	1976 Innsbruck	Individual normal hill

Men's ski flying

World Championships
Bronze medal – third place	1975 Bad Mitterndorf	Individual

Karl Schnabl (born March 8, 1954, in Achomitz, community Hohenthurn, Carinthia) is an Austrian former ski jumper who competed during the 1970s.

His best-known successes were at the 1976 Winter Olympics in Innsbruck, where he won a gold medal in the individual large hill event and a bronze medal in the individual normal hill event. He also won the ski jumping event at the Holmenkollen ski festival in 1976.

Schnabl also won bronze at the FIS Ski Flying World Championships in 1975. He also finished fourth in the individual large hill event at the 1978 FIS Nordic World Ski Championships in Lahti.

Since finishing medical school at Innsbruck University, he has been working as a doctor in sports medicine until he retired in 2019.
