= Sepp Schwinghammer =

German ski jumper

Personal information
- Nationality: German
- Born: 21 September 1950 (age 74); Garmisch-Partenkirchen, West Germany

Sport
- Sport: Ski jumping

Sepp Schwinghammer (born 21 September 1950) is a German ski jumper. He competed at the 1972 Winter Olympics and the 1976 Winter Olympics.
