= Aleksey Borovitin =

Soviet ski jumper (1954–2026)

Medal record

Men's ski jumping

Representing Soviet Union

World Championships
Bronze medal – third place	1974 Falun	Individual normal hill
Bronze medal – third place	1978 Lahti	Individual normal hill

Aleksey Alekseyevich Borovitin (Russian: Алексей Алексеевич Боровитин, 14 February 1954 – 9 September 2026) was a Soviet ski jumper who competed from 1974 to 1981. He won two bronze medals in the individual normal hill event at the FIS Nordic World Ski Championships (1974, 1978). He was born in Kirov.

Borovitin won the ski jumping competition at the 1977 Holmenkollen ski festival and also finished 4th in the Ski-flying World Championships that same year. He also participated in two Winter Olympics with a 15th place in the normal hill event at the 1976 Winter Olympics in Innsbruck as his best result.

Borovitin died on 9 September 2026, at the age of 72.
