= Yury Kalinin =

Soviet ski jumper

Personal information
- Nationality: Soviet
- Born: 20 January 1953 (age 72); Sortavala, Russian SFSR, Soviet Union

Sport
- Sport: Ski jumping

Yury Kalinin (born 20 January 1953) is a Soviet ski jumper. He competed at the 1972 Winter Olympics and the 1976 Winter Olympics.
