= Hans Wallner =

Austrian ski jumper

Personal information
- Nationality: Austria
- Born: 29 May 1953 (age 73) Feistritz an der Gail, Austria
- Height: 1.74 m (5 ft 9 in)

Sport
- Sport: Skiing

World Cup career
- Seasons: 1980–1984
- Indiv. starts: 66*
- Indiv. podiums: 4
- Indiv. wins: 1
Medal record
Men's ski jumping
FIS Nordic World Ski Championships
| Silver medal – second place | 1982 Oslo | Team LH |
- Updated on 10 February 2016

Hans Wallner (born 29 May 1953) is an Austrian former ski jumper.

== Career ==
He won a silver medal in the team large hill event at the 1982 FIS Nordic World Ski Championships in Oslo. Wallner's best finish at the Winter Olympics was 6th in the individual large hill at Innsbruck in 1976. He finished fifth in the FIS Ski-Flying World Championships 1975. Wallner's lone ski jumping victory came in a large hill event at Sapporo in 1981. After retiring he coached the Italian national team for a period.

== World Cup ==
=== Standings ===
| Season | Overall | 4H |
|---|---|---|
| 1979/80 | 10 | 52 |
| 1980/81 | 7 | 6 |
| 1981/82 | 22 | 49 |
| 1982/83 | 14 | 15 |
| 1983/84 | 37 | 54 |

=== Wins ===
| No. | Season | Date | Location | Hill | Size |
|---|---|---|---|---|---|
| 1 | 1980/81 | 15 February 1981 | (Japan) Sapporo | Ōkurayama K110 | LH |
