= Esko Rautionaho =

Finnish ski jumper

Personal information
- Full name: Esko Rautionaho
- Born: 23 September 1950 (age 75) Rovaniemi, Finland
- Height: 1.63 m (5 ft 4 in)

Sport
- Sport: Skiing

World Cup career
- Seasons: 1980
- Updated on 30 Mar 2015

Esko Rautionaho (born 23 September 1950) is a Finnish former ski jumper. He competed at the 1972 Winter Olympics and the 1976 Winter Olympics. His daughter is ski jumper Jenny Rautionaho.

== World Cup ==
=== Standings ===
Season	Overall
1979-80	92
