= Branko Dolhar =

Slovenian ski jumper

Personal information
- Nationality: Slovenian
- Born: 2 February 1949 (age 76); Ljubljana, Yugoslavia

Sport
- Sport: Ski jumping

Branko Dolhar (born 2 February 1949) is a Slovenian ski jumper. He competed in the normal hill and large hill events at the 1976 Winter Olympics.
