= Bogdan Norčič =

Personal information
- Nationality: Yugoslavia
- Born: 19 September 1953 Kranj, Yugoslavia
- Died: 4 April 2004 (aged 50) Cerklje na Gorenjskem, Slovenia

Sport
- Sport: Skiing
- Club: SK Triglav Kranj

World Cup career
- Seasons: 1971–1981
- Indiv. starts: 15
- Indiv. podiums: 2

Achievements and titles
- Personal bests: 168 m (551 ft); Planica, Yugoslavia (18-20 March 1977)

Bogdan Norčič (19 September 1953, Kranj – 4 April 2004, Cerklje na Gorenjskem) was a Yugoslavian ski jumper of Slovene ethnicity. He competed at the 1976 and 1980 Winter Olympics.

== Career ==
On 20 March 1977, Norčič crashed during an attempt at the world record for longest ski jump. Although he soared a world record distance of 181 metres (594 ft) from Velikanka bratov Gorišek K165 in Planica in Yugoslavia, the feat was not official because he failed to land safely. The same distance would be achieved as an official record, in 1983, by Pavel Ploc at Harrachov, and would be exceeded by Matti Nykänen at Oberstdorf in 1990.

== World Cup ==
=== Standings ===
Season	Overall	4H
1971/72	N/A	57
1972/73	N/A	36
1974/75	N/A	32
1975/76	N/A	58
1976/77	N/A	28
1977/78	N/A	27
1978/79	N/A	15
1979/80	20	12
1980/81	70	44

== Invalid ski jumping world record ==
This was the first ever ski jump over 180 metres in history.

Date	Hill	Location	Metres	Feet
20 March 1977	Velikanka bratov Gorišek K165	Planica, Yugoslavia	181	594

Not recognized! Crash at world record distance.
