= 1985–86 Four Hills Tournament =

Ski jumping competition

The 1985-86 Four Hills Tournament took place at the four traditional venues of Oberstdorf, Garmisch-Partenkirchen, Innsbruck and Bischofshofen, located in Germany and Austria, between 30 December 1985 and 6 January 1986.

== Results ==
| Date | Place | Hill | Size | Winner | Second | Third | Ref. |
|---|---|---|---|---|---|---|---|
| 30 Dec 1985 | (West Germany) Oberstdorf | Schattenbergschanze K-115 | LH | (Finland) Pekka Suorsa | (Austria) Franz Neuländtner | (Poland) Piotr Fijas | |
| 1 Jan 1986 | (West Germany) Garmisch-Partenkirchen | Große Olympiaschanze K-107 | LH | (Czechoslovakia) Pavel Ploc | (Austria) Ernst Vettori | (Socialist Federal Republic of Yugoslavia) Primož Ulaga | |
| 4 Jan 1986 | (Austria) Innsbruck | Bergiselschanze K-109 | LH | (Finland) Jari Puikkonen | (Norway) Hroar Stjernen | (Finland) Anssi Nieminen | |
| 6 Jan 1986 | (Austria) Bischofshofen | Paul-Ausserleitner-Schanze K-111 | LH | (Austria) Ernst Vettori | (Austria) Franz Neuländtner | (Norway) Rolf Åge Berg | |

== Overall ==
| Pos | Ski Jumper | Points |
|---|---|---|
| 1 | (Austria) Ernst Vettori | 838.3 |
| 2 | (Austria) Franz Neuländtner | 813.0 |
| 3 | (Finland) Jari Puikkonen | 805.8 |
| 4 | (Norway) Hroar Stjernen | 801.1 |
| 5 | (Norway) Rolf Åge Berg | 796.6 |
| 6 | (Norway) Vegard Opaas | 795.1 |
| 7 | (Poland) Piotr Fijas | 792.0 |
| 8 | (Norway) Olav Hansson | 766.9 |
| 9 | (Italy) Antonio Lacedelli | 756.7 |
| 10 | (Socialist Federal Republic of Yugoslavia) Miran Tepeš | 751.4 |
