= 1985–86 FIS Ski Jumping World Cup =

Ski jumping championship season

1985–86 World Cup
Winners
- Overall: (Finland) Matti Nykänen
- Four Hills Tournament: (Austria) Ernst Vettori
- Swiss Tournament: (Norway) Rolf Åge Berg
- Bohemia Tournament: (Finland) Matti Nykänen
- K.O.P. Ski Flying Week: (Austria) Andreas Felder
- Nations Cup: Austria

Competitions
- Venues: 19
- Individual: 25

The 1985–86 FIS Ski Jumping World Cup was the seventh World Cup season in ski jumping.

Season began in Thunder Bay, Canada on 7 December 1985 and finished in Planica, Yugoslavia on 23 March 1986. The individual World Cup winner became Finnish ski jumper Matti Nykänen (third time in his career) and Nations Cup was taken by Team of Austria.

25 men's individual events on 19 different venues in 12 countries were held on the three different continents (Europe, Asia and North America). And no cancelled this season.

Peaks of the season were FIS Ski Flying World Championships, Four Hills Tournament, Swiss Tournament and the K.O.P. International Ski Flying Week.

On 9 March 1986, at World Championships in Bad Mitterndorf, world record was improved (tied with Matti Nykänen at 191 metres (627 ft) by Andreas Felder. Those two flight were the reason FIS limited (didn't) recognize point for jumps over 191 meters in the next seven years. And this competition was also known by series of horrible crashes from a great height.

== Map of world cup hosts ==
Europe
West & East Germany	Austria Asia	North America

== Calendar ==
=== Men's Individual ===
N – normal hill / L – large hill / F – flying hill
All	No.	Date	Place (Hill)	Size	Winner	Second	Third	Overall leader (Note: Yellow bib for the overall leader was introduced later, from the 1988/89 season onwards.)	R.
142	1	7 December 1985	(Canada) Thunder Bay (Big Thunder K89, K120)	N _{049}	(Socialist Federal Republic of Yugoslavia) Primož Ulaga	(Norway) Vegard Opaas	(Finland) Matti Nykänen	(Socialist Federal Republic of Yugoslavia) Primož Ulaga	
143	2	8 December 1985	(Canada) Thunder Bay (Big Thunder K89, K120)	L _{082}	(Socialist Federal Republic of Yugoslavia) Primož Ulaga	(Austria) Franz Neuländtner	(Austria) Ernst Vettori	(Socialist Federal Republic of Yugoslavia) Primož Ulaga	
144	3	14 December 1985	(United States) Lake Placid (MacKenzie Int. K114, K86)	L _{083}	(Norway) Vegard Opaas	(Socialist Federal Republic of Yugoslavia) Primož Ulaga	(Czechoslovakia) Pavel Ploc	(Socialist Federal Republic of Yugoslavia) Primož Ulaga	
145	4	15 December 1985	(United States) Lake Placid (MacKenzie Int. K114, K86)	N _{050}	(Austria) Franz Neuländtner	(Austria) Ernst Vettori	(Canada) Steve Collins	(Socialist Federal Republic of Yugoslavia) Primož Ulaga	
146	5	22 December 1985	(France) Chamonix (Le Mont K95)	N _{051}	(Finland) Pekka Suorsa	(East Germany) Jens Weißflog	(France) Frédéric Berger	(Socialist Federal Republic of Yugoslavia) Primož Ulaga	
147	6	30 December 1985	(West Germany) Oberstdorf (Schattenbergschanze K115)	L _{084}	(Finland) Pekka Suorsa	(Austria) Franz Neuländtner	(Poland) Piotr Fijas	(Austria) Franz Neuländtner	
148	7	1 January 1986	(West Germany) Garmisch-Pa (Große Olympiaschanze K107)	L _{085}	(Czechoslovakia) Pavel Ploc	(Austria) Ernst Vettori	(Socialist Federal Republic of Yugoslavia) Primož Ulaga	(Socialist Federal Republic of Yugoslavia) Primož Ulaga	
149	8	4 January 1986	(Austria) Innsbruck (Bergiselschanze K109)	L _{086}	(Finland) Jari Puikkonen	(Norway) Hroar Stjernen	(Finland) Anssi Nieminen	(Socialist Federal Republic of Yugoslavia) Primož Ulaga	
150	9	6 January 1986	(Austria) Bischofshofen (Paul-Ausserleitner K111)	L _{087}	(Austria) Ernst Vettori	(Austria) Franz Neuländtner	(Norway) Rolf Åge Berg	(Austria) Franz Neuländtner	
34th Four Hills Tournament Overall (30 December 1985 – 6 January 1986)					(Austria) Ernst Vettori	(Austria) Franz Neuländtner	(Finland) Jari Puikkonen	4H Tournament	
151	10	11 January 1986	(Czechoslovakia) Harrachov (Čerťák K120)	L _{088}	(Finland) Matti Nykänen	(Austria) Ernst Vettori	(Czechoslovakia) Jiří Parma	(Austria) Franz Neuländtner	
152	11	(Note: Only one round held in Liberec due to strong wind and snow.)12 January 1986	(Czechoslovakia) Liberec (Ještěd A K115)	L _{089}	(Poland) Piotr Fijas	(Austria) Ernst Vettori	(Czechoslovakia) Ladislav Dluhoš	(Austria) Franz Neuländtner	
23rd Bohemia Tournament Overall (11 – 12 January 1986)					(Finland) Matti Nykänen	(Austria) Ernst Vettori	(Czechoslovakia) Jiří Parma	Bohemia Tournament	
153	12	17 January 1986	(East Germany) Klingenthal (Aschbergschanze K102)	L _{090}	(Finland) Matti Nykänen	(Socialist Federal Republic of Yugoslavia) Primož Ulaga	(Soviet Union) Valerji Karetnikov	(Socialist Federal Republic of Yugoslavia) Primož Ulaga	
154	13	19 January 1986	(East Germany) Oberwiesenthal (Fichtelbergschanzen K90)	N _{052}	(East Germany) Ulf Findeisen (Austria) Ernst Vettori		(East Germany) Ingo Lesser	(Austria) Ernst Vettori	
155	14	25 January 1986	(Japan) Sapporo (Miyanomori K90) (Ōkurayama K112)	N _{053}	(Finland) Matti Nykänen	(Czechoslovakia) Ladislav Dluhoš	(Czechoslovakia) Pavel Ploc	(Austria) Ernst Vettori	
156	15	26 January 1986	(Japan) Sapporo (Miyanomori K90) (Ōkurayama K112)	L _{091}	(Finland) Matti Nykänen	(Austria) Ernst Vettori	(Czechoslovakia) Jiří Parma	(Finland) Matti Nykänen	
157	16	15 February 1986	(Norway) Vikersund (Vikersundbakken K155)	F _{013}	(Austria) Andreas Felder	(Finland) Matti Nykänen	(Poland) Piotr Fijas	(Finland) Matti Nykänen	
158	17	16 February 1986	(Norway) Vikersund (Vikersundbakken K155)	F _{014}	(Austria) Andreas Felder	(Austria) Ernst Vettori	(Finland) Matti Nykänen	(Finland) Matti Nykänen	
33rd K.O.P. International Ski Flying Week Overall (15 – 16 February 1986)					(Austria) Andreas Felder	(Finland) Matti Nykänen	(Austria) Ernst Vettori	K.O.P.	
159	18	19 February 1986	(Switzerland) St. Moritz (Olympiaschanze K94)	N _{054}	(Norway) Rolf Åge Berg	(Austria) Andreas Felder	(Socialist Federal Republic of Yugoslavia) Miran Tepeš	(Finland) Matti Nykänen	
160	19	21 February 1986	(Switzerland) Gstaad (Mattenschanze K88)	N _{055}	(Austria) Ernst Vettori	(Norway) Rolf Åge Berg	(Finland) Matti Nykänen	(Austria) Ernst Vettori	
161	20	23 February 1986	(Switzerland) Engelberg (Gross-Titlis-Schanze K120)	L _{092}	(Austria) Andreas Felder	(Finland) Matti Nykänen	(Norway) Vegard Opaas	(Austria) Ernst Vettori	
22nd Swiss Tournament Overall (19–23 February 1985)					(Norway) Rolf Åge Berg	(Finland) Matti Nykänen	(East Germany) Ulf Findeisen	Swiss Tournament	
162	21	1 March 1986	(Finland) Lahti (Salpausselkä K90, K113)	N _{056}	(Finland) Matti Nykänen	(Finland) Jari Puikkonen	(Austria) Ernst Vettori	(Austria) Ernst Vettori	
163	22	2 March 1986	(Finland) Lahti (Salpausselkä K90, K113)	L _{093}	(Finland) Matti Nykänen	(Finland) Pekka Suorsa	(Czechoslovakia) Jiří Parma	(Finland) Matti Nykänen	
FIS Ski Flying World Championships 1986 (8 – 9 March • (Austria) Bad Mitterndorf)
164	23	16 March 1986	(Norway) Oslo (Holmenkollbakken K105)	L _{094}	(Austria) Ernst Vettori	(Finland) Matti Nykänen	(Austria) Andreas Felder	(Finland) Matti Nykänen	
165	24	22 March 1986	(Socialist Federal Republic of Yugoslavia) Planica (Srednja Bloudkova K90); Bloudkova velikanka K120)	N _{057}	(Finland) Matti Nykänen	(Austria) Andreas Felder	(Austria) Franz Neuländtner	(Finland) Matti Nykänen	
166	25	23 March 1986	(Socialist Federal Republic of Yugoslavia) Planica (Srednja Bloudkova K90); Bloudkova velikanka K120)	L _{095}	(Austria) Ernst Vettori	(Austria) Andreas Felder	(Finland) Matti Nykänen	(Finland) Matti Nykänen	
7th FIS World Cup Overall (7 December 1985 – 23 March 1986)					(Finland) Matti Nykänen	(Austria) Ernst Vettori	(Austria) Andreas Felder	World Cup Overall	

== Standings ==
=== Overall ===
Rank	after 25 events	Points
1	(Finland) Matti Nykänen	250
2	(Austria) Ernst Vettori	232
3	(Austria) Andreas Felder	170
4	(Austria) Franz Neuländtner	157
5	(Finland) Pekka Suorsa	148
6	(Socialist Federal Republic of Yugoslavia) Primož Ulaga	145
7	(Norway) Vegard Opaas	131
8	(Norway) Rolf Åge Berg	129
9	(Czechoslovakia) Jiří Parma	114
10	(Czechoslovakia) Ladislav Dluhoš	101

=== Nations Cup ===
Rank	after 25 events	Points
1	Austria	730
2	Finland	720
3	Norway	533
4	Czechoslovakia	401
5	Yugoslavia	317
6	East Germany	220
7	Canada	146
8	Poland	127
9	West Germany	72
10	United States	66

=== Four Hills Tournament ===
Rank	after 4 events	Points
1	(Austria) Ernst Vettori	838.3
2	(Austria) Franz Neuländtner	813.0
3	(Finland) Jari Puikkonen	805.8
4	(Norway) Hroar Stjernen	801.1
5	(Norway) Rolf Åge Berg	796.6
6	(Norway) Vegard Opaas	795.1
7	(Poland) Piotr Fijas	792.0
8	(Norway) Olav Hansson	766.9
9	(Italy) Antonio Lacedelli	756.7
10	(Socialist Federal Republic of Yugoslavia) Miran Tepeš	751.4

=== Swiss Tournament ===
Rank	after 3 events	Points
1	(Norway) Rolf Åge Berg	622.3
2	(Finland) Matti Nykänen	622.2
3	(East Germany) Ulf Findeisen	620.4
4	(Austria) Andreas Felder	618.0
5	(Canada) Horst Bulau	606.7
6	(East Germany) Jens Weißflog	606.0
7	(Socialist Federal Republic of Yugoslavia) Miran Tepeš	603.0
8	(Norway) Vegard Opaas	598.4
9	(Finland) Jukka Kalso	595.7
10	(Czechoslovakia) Jiří Parma	592.6

=== Bohemia Tournament ===
Rank	after 2 events	Points
1	(Finland) Matti Nykänen	319.0
2	(Austria) Ernst Vettori	314.7
3	(Czechoslovakia) Jiří Parma	305.5
↓ . . . . . . uncompleted order . . . . . . ↓
N/A	(Socialist Federal Republic of Yugoslavia) Primož Ulaga	298.1
N/A	(Norway) Hroar Stjernen	297.8
N/A	(Czechoslovakia) Ladislav Dluhoš	295.0
N/A	(Norway) Mike Holland	277.4
N/A	(Czechoslovakia) Martin Švagerko	274.5

== See also ==
- 1985–86 FIS Europa Cup (2nd level competition)
