= 1989–90 FIS Ski Jumping World Cup =

Ski jumping championship season

1989–90 World Cup
Winners
- Overall: (Finland) Ari-Pekka Nikkola
- Four Hills Tournament: (West Germany) Dieter Thoma
- Swiss Tournament: (Czechoslovakia) František Jež
- Bohemia Tournament: (Austria) Werner Haim
- Nations Cup: Austria

Competitions
- Venues: 19
- Individual: 25
- Cancelled: 1
- Rescheduled: 2

The 1989–90 FIS Ski Jumping World Cup was the 11th World Cup season in ski jumping.

Season began in Thunder Bay, Canada on 3 December 1989 and finished in Planica, Yugoslavia on 25 March 1990. The individual World Cup overall winner was Finnish jumper Ari-Pekka Nikkola and Nations Cup was taken by Team of Austria for the fifth time in total.

Due to lack of snow competition from Falun was replaced in Sollefteå; and from Bærum to Oslo on Friday (cancelled due to bad water) and once again on Saturday to Raufoss. Originally scheduled Sunday competition in Oslo didn't count for World Cup as porcelain inrun was used instead (warm weather). Coaches and athletes almost boycott the competition as they didn't agree with that FIS decision. Coaches were right as some of the jumpers didn't find their way to porcelain.

25 men's individual events on 19 different venues in 13 countries were held on three different continents (Europe, Asia and North America). Two competition were cancelled this season.

Peaks of the season were Ski Flying World Champ., 4HT, Bohemia and Swiss Tournament.

== Map of world cup hosts ==
Europe
West Germany	Austria Asia	North America

== Calendar ==
=== Men's Individual ===
N – normal hill / L – large hill
All	No.	Date	Place (Hill)	Size	Winner	Second	Third	Overall leader	R.
229	1	3 December 1989	(Canada) Thunder Bay (Big Thunder K120, K90)	L _{129}	(West Germany) Dieter Thoma	(Austria) Heinz Kuttin	(Finland) Ari-Pekka Nikkola	(West Germany) Dieter Thoma	
230	2	4 December 1989	(Canada) Thunder Bay (Big Thunder K120, K90)	N _{084}	(Finland) Risto Laakkonen	(Austria) Andreas Felder	(Austria) Heinz Kuttin	(Austria) Heinz Kuttin	
231	3	9 December 1989	(United States) Lake Placid (MacKenzie Int. K114, K86)	L _{130}	(Austria) Ernst Vettori	(Finland) Matti Nykänen	(Sweden) Jan Boklöv	(Austria) Heinz Kuttin	
232	4	10 December 1989	(United States) Lake Placid (MacKenzie Int. K114, K86)	N _{085}	(Finland) Ari-Pekka Nikkola	(Austria) Ernst Vettori	(Austria) Andreas Felder	(Finland) Ari-Pekka Nikkola	
233	5	16 December 1989	(Japan) Sapporo (Miyanomori K90) (Ōkurayama K115)	N _{086}	(Austria) Ernst Vettori	(Austria) Andreas Felder	(Czechoslovakia) Pavel Ploc	(Austria) Ernst Vettori	
234	6	17 December 1989	(Japan) Sapporo (Miyanomori K90) (Ōkurayama K115)	L _{131}	(East Germany) Jens Weißflog	(Austria) Werner Haim	(Austria) Heinz Kuttin	(Austria) Ernst Vettori	
235	7	30 December 1989	(West Germany) Oberstdorf (Schattenbergschanze K115)	L _{132}	(West Germany) Dieter Thoma	(West Germany) Josef Heumann	(East Germany) Jens Weißflog	(Austria) Ernst Vettori	
236	8	1 January 1990	(West Germany) Garmisch-Pa (Große Olympiaschanze K107)	L _{133}	(East Germany) Jens Weißflog	(Finland) Risto Laakkonen	(Czechoslovakia) František Jež	(Austria) Ernst Vettori	
237	9	4 January 1990	(Austria) Innsbruck (Bergiselschanze K109)	L _{134}	(Finland) Ari-Pekka Nikkola	(East Germany) Jens Weißflog	(Austria) Ernst Vettori	(Austria) Ernst Vettori	
238	10	6 January 1990	(Austria) Bischofshofen (Paul-Ausserleitner K111)	L _{135}	(Czechoslovakia) František Jež	(West Germany) Dieter Thoma	(Norway) Ole Gunnar Fidjestøl	(Austria) Ernst Vettori	
38th Four Hills Tournament Overall (28 December 1989 – 6 January 1990)					(West Germany) Dieter Thoma	(Czechoslovakia) František Jež	(East Germany) Jens Weißflog	4H Tournament	
239	11	12 January 1990	(Czechoslovakia) Harrachov (Čerťák K120)	L _{136}	(West Germany) Dieter Thoma	(Czechoslovakia) Ladislav Dluhoš	(Czechoslovakia) Jiří Parma	(Austria) Ernst Vettori	
240	12	14 January 1990	(Czechoslovakia) Liberec (Ještěd A K120)	L _{137}	(Austria) Werner Haim	(Czechoslovakia) Pavel Ploc	(Soviet Union) Pavel Kustov	(Austria) Ernst Vettori	
26th Bohemia Tournament Overall (12 – 14 January 1990)					(Austria) Werner Haim	(Czechoslovakia) Ladislav Dluhoš	(Austria) Ernst Vettori	Bohemia Tournament	
241	13	17 January 1990	(Poland) Zakopane (Wielka Krokiew K116)	L _{138}	(East Germany) Jens Weißflog	(Austria) Andreas Felder	(Norway) Ole Gunnar Fidjestøl	(Austria) Ernst Vettori	
242	14	7 February 1990	(Switzerland) St. Moritz (Olympiaschanze K94)	N _{087}	(Czechoslovakia) František Jež	(Austria) Heinz Kuttin	(Austria) Ernst Vettori	(Austria) Ernst Vettori	
243	15	9 February 1990	(Switzerland) Gstaad (Mattenschanze K88)	N _{088}	(Czechoslovakia) František Jež	(Socialist Federal Republic of Yugoslavia) Miran Tepeš	(Finland) Ari-Pekka Nikkola	(Austria) Ernst Vettori	
244	16	11 February 1990	(Switzerland) Engelberg (Gross-Titlis-Schanze K120)	L _{139}	(Finland) Ari-Pekka Nikkola (Socialist Federal Republic of Yugoslavia) Franci Petek		(Socialist Federal Republic of Yugoslavia) Primož Ulaga (Austria) A. Rauschmeier	(Austria) Ernst Vettori	
24th Swiss Tournament Overall (7 – 11 February 1990)					(Czechoslovakia) František Jež	(Austria) Heinz Kuttin	(Finland) Ari-Pekka Nikkola	Swiss Tournament	
245	17	16 February 1990	(Italy) Predazzo (Trampolino dal Ben K90, K120)	N _{089}	(Italy) Roberto Cecon	(East Germany) Jens Weißflog	(Italy) Virginio Lunardi	(Austria) Ernst Vettori	
246	18	18 February 1990	(Italy) Predazzo (Trampolino dal Ben K90, K120)	L _{140}	(Czechoslovakia) František Jež	(Austria) Ernst Vettori	(Switzerland) Stephan Zünd	(Austria) Ernst Vettori	
FIS Ski Flying World Championships 1990 (25 February • (Norway) Vikersund)
247	19	3 March 1990	(Finland) Lahti (Salpausselkä K114, K90)	L _{141}	(Austria) Franz Neuländtner	(Italy) Virginio Lunardi	(Finland) Ari-Pekka Nikkola	(Austria) Ernst Vettori	
248	20	4 March 1990	(Finland) Lahti (Salpausselkä K114, K90)	N _{090}	(Austria) Andreas Felder	(Italy) Virginio Lunardi	(Finland) Ari-Pekka Nikkola	(Austria) Ernst Vettori	
249	21	7 March 1990	(Sweden) Örnsköldsvik (Paradiskullen K82)	N _{091}	(Austria) Andreas Felder	(Austria) Werner Haim	(West Germany) Thomas Klauser	(Austria) Ernst Vettori	
		11 March 1990	(Sweden) Falun (Lugnet K112)	L _{cnx}	rescheduled to Sollefteå due to lack of snow			—	
250	22	(Note: Cancelled event from Falun (11 March) was rescheduled to Sollefteå on same day.)11 March 1990	(Sweden) Sollefteå (Hallstabacken K105)	L _{142}	(Czechoslovakia) Pavel Ploc	(Finland) Ari-Pekka Nikkola	(Italy) Virginio Lunardi	(Finland) Ari-Pekka Nikkola	
		15 March 1990	(Norway) Bærum (Skuibakken K110)	L _{cnx}	rescheduled to Oslo due to lack of snow on 16 March			—	
		(Note: Cancelled event from Bærum (15 March) was rescheduled to Oslo (16 March).)16 March 1990	(Norway) Oslo (Holmenkollbakken K105)	L _{cnx}	moved from Bærum; again cancelled due to wind and high temperatures (the 2nd and final time rescheduled; now to Raufoss on 17 March)			—	
251	23	(Note: Originally cancelled event from Bærum (15 March) was unsuccessfully rescheduled to Oslo (16 March) and again to Raufoss (17 March).)17 March 1990	(Norway) Raufoss (Lønnbergbakken K90)	N _{092}	(Austria) Andreas Felder	(Austria) Heinz Kuttin	(East Germany) Jens Weißflog	(Finland) Ari-Pekka Nikkola	
		18 March 1990	(Norway) Oslo (Holmenkollbakken K105)	L _{cnx}	it didn't count for WC as they installed porcelain inrun due to warm weather			—	
252	24	24 March 1990	(Socialist Federal Republic of Yugoslavia) Planica (Bloudkova velikanka K120)	L _{143}	(Italy) Roberto Cecon	(Finland) Ari-Pekka Nikkola	(East Germany) Jens Weißflog	(Finland) Ari-Pekka Nikkola	
253	25	25 March 1990	(Socialist Federal Republic of Yugoslavia) Planica (Bloudkova velikanka K120)	L _{144}	(Finland) Ari-Pekka Nikkola	(West Germany) Dieter Thoma	(Socialist Federal Republic of Yugoslavia) Primož Ulaga	(Finland) Ari-Pekka Nikkola	
11th FIS World Cup Overall (3 December 1989 – 25 March 1990)					(Finland) Ari-Pekka Nikkola	(Austria) Ernst Vettori	(Austria) Andreas Felder	World Cup Overall	

== Standings ==
=== Overall ===
Rank	after 25 events	Points
1	(Finland) Ari-Pekka Nikkola	287
2	(Austria) Ernst Vettori	239
3	(Austria) Andreas Felder	236
4	(West Germany) Dieter Thoma	206
5	(Czechoslovakia) František Jež	202
6	(East Germany) Jens Weißflog	200
7	(Czechoslovakia) Pavel Ploc	186
8	(Austria) Heinz Kuttin	176
9	(Austria) Werner Haim	137
10	(Italy) Virginio Lunardi	135

=== Nations Cup ===
Rank	after 25 events	Points
1	Austria	912
2	Czechoslovakia	506
3	Finland	502
4	West Germany	344
5	East Germany	233
6	Yugoslavia	228
7	Italy	210
8	Norway	155
9	Sweden	114
10	Soviet Union	108

=== Four Hills Tournament ===
Rank	after 4 events	Points
1	(West Germany) Dieter Thoma	870.5
2	(Czechoslovakia) František Jež	861.0
3	(East Germany) Jens Weißflog	855.0
4	(Austria) Ernst Vettori	851.5
5	(Finland) Ari-Pekka Nikkola	848.0
6	(Finland) Risto Laakkonen	844.0
7	(West Germany) Josef Heumann	835.5
8	(Norway) Rune Olijnyk	823.5
9	(Austria) Werner Haim	820.5
10	(Austria) Heinz Kuttin	811.0

=== Bohemia Tournament ===
Rank	after 2 events	Points
1	(Austria) Werner Haim	418.0
2	(Czechoslovakia) Ladislav Dluhoš	412.5
3	(Austria) Ernst Vettori	410.5
4	(Italy) Virginio Lunardi	403.5
5	(Czechoslovakia) Pavel Ploc	400.5
6	(Czechoslovakia) František Jež	388.0
	(Soviet Union) Pavel Kustov	388.0
8	(Norway) Ole Gunnar Fidjestøl	385.0
9	(Czechoslovakia) Jiří Parma	381.0
10	(Socialist Federal Republic of Yugoslavia) Miran Tepeš	380.0
	(Switzerland) Christian Hauswirth	380.0

=== Swiss Tournament ===
Rank	after 3 events	Points
1	(Czechoslovakia) František Jež	637.9
2	(Austria) Heinz Kuttin	625.5
3	(Finland) Ari-Pekka Nikkola	625.4
4	(Austria) Ernst Vettori	622.1
5	(Austria) Andreas Rauschmeier	621.7
6	(Czechoslovakia) Pavel Ploc	610.7
7	(Socialist Federal Republic of Yugoslavia) Miran Tepeš	609.6
8	(Italy) Virginio Lunardi	602.0
9	(Socialist Federal Republic of Yugoslavia) Franci Petek	597.6
10	(West Germany) Andreas Bauer	587.7

== See also ==
- 1989–90 FIS Europa Cup (2nd level competition)
