= Lake Placid Olympic Ski Jumping Complex =

Ski jumping hill in Lake Placid, New York

Coordinates: 44.2561°N 73.9640°W

- MacKenzie Intervale
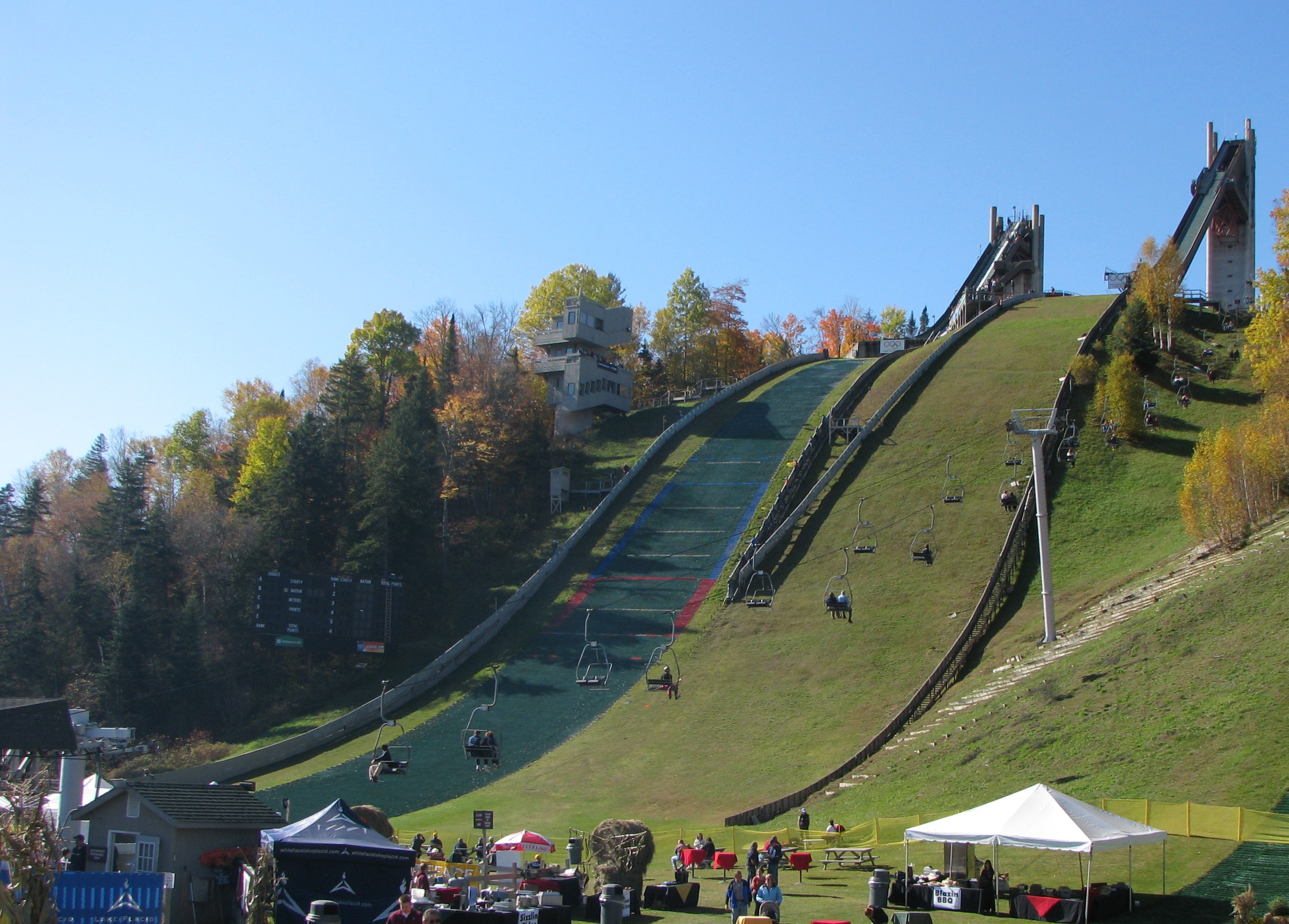
- Designer: Karl Martitsch
- Design firm: Stone & Webster
- Location: Lake Placid, New York, United States
- Operator: Olympic Regional Development Authority
- Opened: 21 February 1921 (Large); December 1978 (Normal)
- Renovated: 2021
- Expanded: 1923, 1932, 1950, 1965, 1977, 1980, 1983, 1994, 2011, 2021

Size
- K–point: 90 metres (300 ft); 115 metres (377 ft)
- Hill size: 100 metres (330 ft); 128 metres (420 ft)
- Hill record: 136 metres (446 ft) (Japan) Ryōyū Kobayashi (11 February 2023)

Top events
- Olympics: 1932, 1980
- World Championships: 1950

The Lake Placid Olympic Ski Jumping Complex, also known as the MacKenzie Intervale Ski Jumping Complex, consists of HS100- and HS128-meter ski jump towers built for the 1980 Olympic Games in Lake Placid, New York, United States. Modernized and lengthened in 2021, they are the only jumps in North America homologated for winter and summer jumping competitions. The complex is operated by the Olympic Regional Development Authority.

The 128-meter jump features an Observation deck which offers views of nearby John Brown's Farm and the surrounding High Peaks of the Adirondacks. Training and competition for Nordic ski jumping takes place year round thanks to a plastic mat out-run on the 90m jump. The Freestyle Aerial Training Center is located to the right of the base of the jump towers. Aerialists can train in the summer months by jumping into a 750,000 gallon pool.

In 2018, funding was approved to upgrade the tracks with cooling to ensure winter operation. Also, the smaller hills will be upgraded to current FIS standards with a safer spread of heights for jumpers to progress. This is in tandem with a number of major games being hosted by Lake Placid over the next few years.

On 11 February 2023, the complex hosted the first World Cup Men's super team (pairs) event in history.

== Hill parameters ==
- Construction point: 115 m
- Hill size (HS): 128 m
- Official hill record: 136.0 metres (446.2 ft) – (Japan) Ryōyū Kobayashi (11 February 2023)
- Inrun length: 98.07 m
- Inrun angle: 35.1°
- Take-off length: 6.89 m
- Take-off angle: 11°
- Take-off height: 3.08 m
- Landing angle: 34.1°
- Average speed: 93.1 km/h
- Homologation source:

== History ==
The Lake Placid Club built the first ski jump on this site in 1920, using the hillside itself as the jump surface. The jump was referred to as the Intervales 35-meter jump. On 21 February 1921, the first competition was held at this site, drawing 3,000 spectators. The record jump for the day was 124 feet, set by Antony Maurer. In 1923, the jump was enlarged to fifty meters, and in 1927, a new steel tower was built, raising the jump to 60 meters. In 1928, the tower was raised to 75 meters; this was the tower used for the 1932 Winter Olympic Games. In 1977, the old tower was demolished to make way for new 70 and 90-meter jumps, used for the 1980 Winter Olympic Games. In 1994, the landing hills were re-graded to bring the jumps into compliance with current rules, and increasing their height to 90 and 120 meters. In 2019, a pulse gondola was installed to replace an aging double chair which served the ski jumps. In 2021, both jumps received upgrades that enabled year-round training and increased reliability, in addition to a new base lodge.

The towers were built using a jacking system that lifted and poured concrete into the forms continuously, night and day, for 15 days for the larger jump, and 9 days for the smaller one.

The present record jumps stand at 105 meters for the 90-meter jump, set by Henry Loher, of Lake Placid, and 136.0 meters for the 120-meter jump, set by Ryōyū Kobayashi of Japan.

== Ski jumping events ==
=== Winter Olympic Games ===
The complex was a venue in the 1932 Winter Olympics and 1980 Winter Olympics.

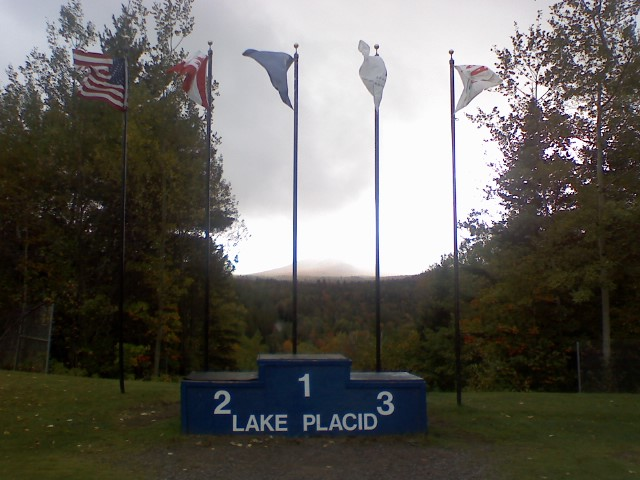
Olympic podiums

| Year | Date | Hill | Winner | Second place | Third place | Ref |
|---|---|---|---|---|---|---|
↓ Men's Individual ↓
| 1932 | 12 February | K60 | (Norway) Birger Ruud | (Norway) Hans Beck | (Norway) Kåre Walberg | |
| 1980 | 17 February | K86 | (Austria) Toni Innauer | (Japan) Hirokazu Yagi (East Germany) Manfred Deckert | | |
| 1980 | 23 February | K114 | (Finland) Jouko Törmänen | (Austria) Hubert Neuper | (Finland) Jari Puikkonen | |

=== FIS Nordic World Championships ===
| Year | Date | Hill | Winner | Second place | Third place | Ref |
|---|---|---|---|---|---|---|
↓ Men's Individual ↓
| 1950 | 5 February | K61 | (Norway) Hans Bjørnstad | (Sweden) Thure Lindgren | (Norway) Arnfinn Bergmann | |

=== FIS World Cup ===
| Season | Date | Hill | Winner | Second place | Third place | Ref |
|---|---|---|---|---|---|---|
↓ Men's Individual ↓
| 1982/83 | 15 January | K114 | (Finland) Matti Nykänen | (Austria) Armin Kogler | (United States) Jeff Hastings | |
| 1982/83 | 16 January | K114 | (Finland) Matti Nykänen | (Austria) Armin Kogler | (Norway) Steinar Bråten | |
| 1983/84 | 17 December | K86 | (Socialist Federal Republic of Yugoslavia) Primož Ulaga | (Finland) Matti Nykänen | (Canada) Horst Bulau (United States) Jeff Hastings | |
| 1983/84 | 18 December | K114 | (United States) Jeff Hastings | (Socialist Federal Republic of Yugoslavia) Primož Ulaga | (Czechoslovakia) Jiří Parma | |
| 1984/85 | 15 December | K114 | (Austria) Andreas Felder | (Czechoslovakia) Jiří Parma | (Austria) Ernst Vettori | |
| 1984/85 | 16 December | K86 | (Austria) Andreas Felder | (Finland) Jari Puikkonen | (Norway) Per Bergerud | |
| 1985/86 | 14 December | K114 | (Norway) Vegard Opaas | (Socialist Federal Republic of Yugoslavia) Primož Ulaga | (Czechoslovakia) Pavel Ploc | |
| 1985/86 | 15 December | K86 | (Austria) Franz Neuländtner | (Austria) Ernst Vettori | (Canada) Steve Collins | |
| 1986/87 | 13 December | K114 | (Norway) Vegard Opaas | (Austria) Ernst Vettori | (Socialist Federal Republic of Yugoslavia) Primož Ulaga | |
| 1986/87 | 14 December | K86 | (Austria) Ernst Vettori | (Socialist Federal Republic of Yugoslavia) Primož Ulaga | (Norway) Vegard Opaas | |
| 1987/88 | 12 December | K114 | (Czechoslovakia) Pavel Ploc | (West Germany) Dieter Thoma | (West Germany) Andreas Bauer | |
| 1987/88 | 13 December | K86 | (Czechoslovakia) Pavel Ploc | (Czechoslovakia) Jiří Parma | (Norway) Vegard Opaas | |
| 1988/89 | 10 December | K114 | (Sweden) Jan Boklöv | (Austria) Ernst Vettori | (Finland) Pekka Suorsa | |
| 1988/89 | 11 December | K86 | (Norway) Vegard Opaas | (Austria) Ernst Vettori | (West Germany) Thomas Klauser | |
| 1989/90 | 9 December | K114 | (Austria) Ernst Vettori | (Finland) Matti Nykänen | (Sweden) Jan Boklöv | |
| 1989/90 | 10 December | K86 | (Finland) Ari-Pekka Nikkola | (Austria) Ernst Vettori | (Austria) Andreas Felder | |
| 1990/91 | 1 December | K86 | (Austria) Andreas Felder | (Finland) Ari-Pekka Nikkola | (Finland) Anssi Nieminen | |
| 1990/91 | 2 December | K114 | (Germany) André Kiesewetter | (Switzerland) Stephan Zünd | (Austria) Ernst Vettori | |
| 2022/23 | 11 February | HS128 | (Germany) Andreas Wellinger | (Japan) Ryōyū Kobayashi | (Austria) Daniel Tschofenig | |
| 2022/23 | 12 February | HS128 | (Norway) Halvor Egner Granerud | (Germany) Andreas Wellinger | (Austria) Stefan Kraft | |
| 2023/24 | 10 February | HS128 | (Slovenia) Lovro Kos | (Japan) Ryōyū Kobayashi | (Norway) Marius Lindvik | |
| 2023/24 | 11 February | HS128 | (Austria) Stefan Kraft | (Slovenia) Lovro Kos (Germany) Philipp Raimund | – | |
| 2024/25 | 8 February | HS128 | (Norway) Johann André Forfang | (Austria) Jan Hörl | (Austria) Daniel Tschofenig | |
| 2024/25 | 9 February | HS128 | (Austria) Daniel Tschofenig | (Austria) Jan Hörl | (Slovenia) Anže Lanišek | |
↓ Women's Individual ↓
| 2024/25 | 7 February | HS128 | (Slovenia) Nika Prevc | (Norway) Eirin Maria Kvandal | (Canada) Alexandria Loutitt | |
| 2024/25 | 8 February | HS128 | (Slovenia) Nika Prevc | (Germany) Agnes Reisch | (Germany) Selina Freitag | |
↓ Men's Super team ↓
| 2022/23 | 11 February | HS128 | Poland Dawid Kubacki; Piotr Żyła | Austria Daniel Tschofenig; Stefan Kraft | Japan Ryoyu Kobayashi; Naoki Nakamura | |
| 2023/24 | 10 February | HS128 | Austria Michael Hayböck; Stefan Kraft | Germany Philipp Raimund; Andreas Wellinger | Norway Johann André Forfang; Marius Lindvik | |
↓ Mixed team ↓
| 2024/25 | 8 February | HS128 | Germany: 1. Agnes Reisch; 2. Philipp Raimund; 3. Selina Freitag; 4. Andreas Wellinger | Norway: 1. Thea Minyan Bjørseth; 2. Kristoffer Eriksen Sundal; 3. Eirin Maria Kvandal; 4. Johann André Forfang | Austria: 1. Lisa Eder; 2. Jan Hörl; 3. J. Seifriedsberger; 4. Daniel Tschofenig | |

=== FIS Junior Nordic World Championships ===
| Season | Date | Hill | Winner | Second place | Third place | Ref |
|---|---|---|---|---|---|---|
↓ Men's Individual ↓
| 1986 | 16 February | K114 | (Italy) Virginio Lunardi | (West Germany) Christian Rimmel | (Norway) Clas Brede Bråthen | |
↓ Men's team ↓
| 1986 | 13 February | HS128 | West Germany Dieter Thoma; Christian Rimmel; Robert Leonhardt; Friedrich Braun | Italy Virginio Lunardi; Carlo Pinzani; Paolo Rigoni | Soviet Union Juri Durinov; Michail Esin; Sergej Badenko; Evgeny Vashurin | |

=== FISU Winter World University Games ===
| Year | Date | Hill | Winner | Second place | Third place | Ref |
|---|---|---|---|---|---|---|
↓ Men's Individual ↓
| 1972 | 5 March | K70 | (Japan) Hideki Nakano | (Soviet Union) Gariy Napalkov | (Soviet Union) Yuriy Kalinin | |
| 2023 | 16 January | HS100 | (Kazakhstan) Danil Vassilyev | (Austria) Maximilian Lienher | (Austria) Timon-Pascal Kahofer | |
↓ Women's Individual ↓
| 2023 | 16 January | HS100 | (Poland) Nicole Konderla | (Japan) Machiko Kubota | (Poland) Kinga Rajda | |
↓ Mixed team ↓
| 2023 | 18 January | HS100 | Poland I Nicole Konderla; Adam Niżnik | Japan Machiko Kubota; Ryusei Ikeda | Poland II Kinga Rajda; Szymon Jojko | |
↓ Men's team ↓
| 2023 | 20 January | HS100 | Austria Timon-Pascal Kahofer; Maximilian Lienher | Kazakhstan Sergey Tkachenko; Danil Vassilyev | Japan Sakutaro Kobayashi; Ryusei Ikeda | |
↓ Women's team ↓
| 2023 | 20 January | HS100 | Poland I Kinga Rajda; Nicole Konderla | Poland II Paulina Cieślar; Anna Twardosz | Japan Miki Ikeda; Machiko Kubota | |

=== Other ===
- Winter Goodwill Games: 2000
