= Ari-Pekka Nikkola =

Finnish ski jumper (born 1969)

Personal information
- Nationality: Finland
- Born: 16 May 1969 (age 57) Kuopio, Finland
- Height: 1.72 m (5 ft 8 in)

Sport
- Sport: Skiing

World Cup career
- Seasons: 1986–1998
- Indiv. starts: 192
- Indiv. podiums: 42
- Indiv. wins: 9
- Team starts: 7
- Team podiums: 6
- Team wins: 4
- Overall titles: 1 (1990)
- JP titles: 1 (1996)

Achievements and titles
- Personal bests: 183 m (600 ft); Kulm, 9-11 February 1996
Medal record
Men's ski jumping
Olympic Games
Gold medal – first place	1988 Calgary	Team LH
Gold medal – first place	1992 Albertville	Team LH
FIS Nordic World Ski Championships
Gold medal – first place	1987 Oberstdorf	Team LH
Gold medal – first place	1989 Lahti	Team LH
Gold medal – first place	1995 Thunder Bay	Team LH
Gold medal – first place	1997 Trondheim	Team LH
Silver medal – second place	1989 Lahti	Individual NH
Silver medal – second place	1991 Val di Fiemme	Team LH
Bronze medal – third place	1991 Val di Fiemme	Individual NH
- Updated on 10 February 2016

Ari-Pekka Nikkola (born 16 May 1969) is a Finnish former ski jumper.

== Career ==
He won two gold medals in the Team large hill competition at the 1988 Winter Olympics in Calgary and the 1992 Winter Olympics in Albertville. His best individual finish was a 15th place in the Individual normal hill at the 1998 Winter Olympics in Nagano.

His biggest successes were at the FIS Nordic World Ski Championships, where he won seven medals. This included four golds (Team large hill: 1987, 1989, 1995, and 1997), two silver (Individual normal hill: 1989, Team large hill: 1991), and one bronze (Individual normal hill: 1991).

== World Cup ==
=== Standings ===
Season	Overall	4H	SF	NT	JP
1985/86	47	18	N/A	N/A	N/A
1986/87	10	31	N/A	N/A	N/A
1987/88	19	—	N/A	N/A	N/A
1988/89	5	30	N/A	N/A	N/A
1989/90	1st place, gold medalist(s)	5	N/A	N/A	N/A
1990/91	5	6	8	N/A	N/A
1991/92	12	8	—	N/A	N/A
1992/93	—	—	—	N/A	N/A
1993/94	16	30	—	N/A	N/A
1994/95	8	4	10	N/A	N/A
1995/96	2nd place, silver medalist(s)	2nd place, silver medalist(s)	5	N/A	1st place, gold medalist(s)
1996/97	12	6	—	22	11
1997/98	29	20	—	59	23

=== Wins ===
No.	Season	Date	Location	Hill	Size
1	1986/87	28 February 1987	(Finland) Lahti	Salpausselkä K88	NH
2	1986/87	4 March 1987	(Sweden) Örnsköldsvik	Paradiskullen K82	NH
3	1989/90	10 December 1989	(United States) Lake Placid	MacKenzie Intervale K86	NH
4	1989/90	4 January 1990	(Austria) Innsbruck	Bergiselschanze K109	LH
5	1989/90	11 February 1990	(Switzerland) Engelberg	Gross-Titlis-Schanze K120	LH
6	1989/90	25 March 1990	(Socialist Federal Republic of Yugoslavia) Planica	Bloudkova velikanka K120	LH
7	1990/91	4 January 1991	(Austria) Innsbruck	Bergiselschanze K109	LH
8	1995/96	16 December 1995	(France) Chamonix	Le Mont K95	NH
9	1995/96	21 January 1996	(Japan) Sapporo	Ōkurayama K115	LH
