= Andreas Felder =

Austrian ski jumper (born 1962)

Personal information
- Nationality: Austria
- Born: 6 March 1962 (age 64) Hall, Austria
- Height: 180 cm (5 ft 11 in)

Sport
- Sport: Skiing

World Cup career
- Seasons: 1980–1992
- Indiv. starts: 166
- Indiv. podiums: 51
- Indiv. wins: 25
- Team starts: 2
- Team podiums: 2
- Overall titles: 1 (1991)

Achievements and titles
- Personal bests: 191 m (627 ft); Kulm, 9 March 1986; Planica, 14 March 1987
Medal record
Men's ski jumping
Olympic Games
Silver medal – second place	1992 Albertville	Team LH
FIS Nordic World Ski Championships
Gold medal – first place	1987 Oberstdorf	Individual LH
Gold medal – first place	1991 Val di Fiemme	Team LH
Silver medal – second place	1982 Oslo	Team LH
Silver medal – second place	1985 Seefeld	Individual NH
Silver medal – second place	1985 Seefeld	Team LH
Bronze medal – third place	1987 Oberstdorf	Individual NH
Men's ski flying
FIS Ski Flying World Championships
Gold medal – first place	1986 Bad Mitterndorf	Individual
- Updated on 10 February 2016

Andreas Felder (born 6 March 1962) is an Austrian former ski jumper. During this period he dominated the sport, together with contemporaries Jens Weißflog and Matti Nykänen. He finished in the top three overall six times in the World Cup and won the 1990/91 overall. He won his first international championship medal at the 1982 FIS Nordic World Ski Championships in Oslo with a silver medal in the team large hill event.

== Career ==
His big breakthrough came in the 1984/85 season. In December that year he won the World cup competition in Thunder Bay, Ontario, Canada. He won six competitions in that season, but ended in 2nd place overall behind Matti Nykänen. At the 1985 FIS Nordic World Ski Championships in Seefeld, he won silver medals both in the individual normal hill and the team large hill.

He won the FIS Ski Flying World Championships 1986 in Bad Mitterndorf, the 1987 FIS Nordic World Ski Championships in Oberstdorf with gold in the individual large hill and bronze in the team large hill events. He won the ski jumping competition at the 1987 Holmenkollen ski festival. In the 1990/91 season and won his only World Cup overall and also won the team large hill gold medal at the Nordic World Ski Championships 1991.

He also won a silver medal in the team large hill at the 1992 Winter Olympics in Albertville. Felder finished his World Cup career with victory on 29 March 1992 when he won the ski jumping competition in Planica, Slovenia. After his retirement he became a manager in the Austrian Ski Federation (until March 19, 1997). Afterwards he was a manager in the German Ski Federation's Nordic Combined Team.

=== Ski flying ===
On 9 March 1986, he tied the world ski jumping distance record with Matti Nykänen at 191 metres (627 ft) at FIS Ski Flying World Championships on Kulm hill in Tauplitz/Bad Mitterndorf, Austria.

On 13 March 1987, he touched the ground at world record distance at 192 metres (630 ft) at the World Cup official training on Velikanka bratov Gorišek in Planica, Yugoslavia. On the next day he landed at 191 metres (627 ft) and only tied his personal best, as this jump was achieved in the repeated third round, after and because of the world record by Piotr Fijas.

=== Coaching ===
In 1995 Felder replaced Heinz Koch as the head coach of Austrian ski jumping team. He led Reinhard Schwarzenberger to third place in Four Hills Tournament, and Andreas Goldberger to victory in the 1995-96 World Cup, and a gold medal during the FIS Ski Flying World Championships 1996. In the following season he helped Goldberger win bronze medal during the FIS Nordic World Ski Championships 1997 in Trondheim. After the end of the season Felder resigned. He became team's head coach once again in 2018, replacing Heinz Kuttin. With Felder as his coach, Stefan Kraft won bronze in Seefeld in 2019, and won the 2019-20 World Cup.

== World Cup ==
=== Standings ===
Season	Overall	4H	SF
1979/80	—	112	N/A
1980/81	13	74	N/A
1981/82	14	55	N/A
1982/83	46	—	N/A
1983/84	15	10	N/A
1984/85	2nd place, silver medalist(s)	6	N/A
1985/86	3rd place, bronze medalist(s)	15	N/A
1986/87	3rd place, bronze medalist(s)	12	N/A
1987/88	23	28	N/A
1988/89	14	19	N/A
1989/90	3rd place, bronze medalist(s)	14	N/A
1990/91	1st place, gold medalist(s)	2nd place, silver medalist(s)	10
1991/92	3rd place, bronze medalist(s)	6	3rd place, bronze medalist(s)

=== Wins ===
No.	Season	Date	Location	Hill	Size
1	1984/85	8 December 1984	(Canada) Thunder Bay	Big Thunder K89	NH
2	1984/85	8 December 1984	(Canada) Thunder Bay	Big Thunder K120	LH
3	1984/85	15 December 1984	(United States) Lake Placid	MacKenzie Intervale K114	LH
4	1984/85	16 December 1984	(United States) Lake Placid	MacKenzie Intervale K86	NH
5	1984/85	3 March 1985	(Finland) Lahti	Salpausselkä K113	LH
6	1984/85	8 March 1985	(Sweden) Falun	Lugnet K112	LH
7	1985/86	15 February 1986	(Norway) Vikersund	Vikersundbakken K155	FH
8	1985/86	16 February 1986	(Norway) Vikersund	Vikersundbakken K155	FH
9	1985/86	23 February 1986	(Switzerland) Engelberg	Gross-Titlis-Schanze K120	LH
10	1986/87	14 March 1987	(Socialist Federal Republic of Yugoslavia) Planica	Velikanka bratov Gorišek K185	FH
11	1986/87	21 March 1987	(Norway) Oslo	Holmenkollbakken K105	LH
12	1989/90	4 March 1990	(Finland) Lahti	Salpausselkä K90	NH
13	1989/90	7 March 1990	(Sweden) Örnsköldsvik	Paradiskullen K82	NH
14	1989/90	17 March 1990	(Norway) Raufoss	Lønnbergbakken K90	NH
15	1990/91	1 December 1990	(United States) Lake Placid	MacKenzie Intervale K86	NH
16	1990/91	8 December 1990	(Canada) Thunder Bay	Big Thunder K90	NH
17	1990/91	8 December 1990	(Canada) Thunder Bay	Big Thunder K120	LH
18	1990/91	1 January 1991	(Germany) Garmisch-Partenkirchen	Große Olympiaschanze K107	LH
19	1990/91	6 January 1991	(Austria) Bischofshofen	Paul-Ausserleitner-Schanze K111	LH
20	1990/91	2 March 1991	(Finland) Lahti	Salpausselkä K90	NH
21	1990/91	3 March 1991	(Finland) Lahti	Salpausselkä K114	LH
22	1991/92	1 January 1992	(Germany) Garmisch-Partenkirchen	Große Olympiaschanze K107	LH
23	1991/92	17 January 1992	(Switzerland) St. Moritz	Olympiaschanze K95	NH
24	1991/92	19 January 1992	(Switzerland) Engelberg	Gross-Titlis-Schanze K120	LH
25	1991/92	29 March 1992	(Slovenia) Planica	Bloudkova velikanka K120	LH

== Ski jumping world records ==
Date	Hill	Location	Metres	Feet
9 March 1986	Kulm K185	Tauplitz/Bad Mitterndorf, Austria	191	627
13 March 1987	Velikanka bratov Gorišek K185	Planica, Yugoslavia	192	630

Not recognized! Touched the ground at world record distance.
