= 1986–87 FIS Ski Jumping World Cup =

Ski jumping championship season

1986–87 World Cup
Winners
- Overall: (Norway) Vegard Opaas
- Four Hills Tournament: (Austria) Ernst Vettori
- K.O.P. Ski Flying Week: (Austria) Andreas Felder
- Nations Cup: Austria

Competitions
- Venues: 16
- Individual: 22
- Cancelled: 1

The 1986–87 FIS Ski Jumping World Cup was the 8th World Cup season in ski jumping.

Season began in Thunder Bay, Canada on 6 December 1986 and was finished in Oslo, Norway on 21 March 1987. The individual World Cup winner was Norwegian ski jumper Vegard Opaas (first for his country) and Nations Cup was taken by Team of Austria.

22 men's individual events on 15 different venues in 12 countries were held on three different continents (Europe, Asia and North America). One competition was cancelled this season in Oberhof due to strong wind and freezing cold weather.

Peaks of the season were Nordic World Ski Championships, 4H Tournament and K.O.P.

On 14 March 1987 in Planica, polish Piotr Fijas improved the world record on 194 metres (636 ft). But FIS didn't recognize distances longer than 191 metres at that time.

== World records ==
List of world record distances (both official and invalid) achieved within this World Cup season.

Date	Athlete	Hill	Round	Place	Metres	Feet
13 March 1987	(Austria) Andreas Felder	Velikanka bratov Gorišek K185	Training R2	Planica, Yugoslavia	192	636
14 March 1987	(Poland) Piotr Fijas	Velikanka bratov Gorišek K185	Round 3	Planica, Yugoslavia	194	630

Longest jump in history at that time, but invalid due to Felder touched the snow with his hands upon landing.

== Map of world cup hosts ==
Europe
West & East Germany	Austria Asia	North America

== Calendar ==
=== Men's Individual ===
N – normal hill / L – large hill / F – flying hill
All	No.	Date	Place (Hill)	Size	Winner	Second	Third	Overall leader (Note: Yellow bib for the overall leader was introduced later, from the 1988/89 season onwards.)	R.
167	1	6 December 1986	(Canada) Thunder Bay (Big Thunder K89, K120)	N _{058}	(East Germany) Jens Weißflog	(Finland) Matti Nykänen	(Finland) Jukka Kalso	(East Germany) Jens Weißflog	
168	2	7 December 1986	(Canada) Thunder Bay (Big Thunder K89, K120)	L _{096}	(Finland) Matti Nykänen	(West Germany) Thomas Klauser	(Norway) Vegard Opaas	(Finland) Matti Nykänen	
169	3	13 December 1986	(United States) Lake Placid (MacKenzie Int. K114, K86)	L _{097}	(Norway) Vegard Opaas	(Austria) Ernst Vettori	(Socialist Federal Republic of Yugoslavia) Primož Ulaga	(Norway) Vegard Opaas	
170	4	14 December 1986	(United States) Lake Placid (MacKenzie Int. K114, K86)	N _{059}	(Austria) Ernst Vettori	(Socialist Federal Republic of Yugoslavia) Primož Ulaga	(Norway) Vegard Opaas	(Norway) Vegard Opaas	
171	5	21 December 1986	(France) Chamonix (Le Mont K95)	N _{060}	(Czechoslovakia) Martin Švagerko	(Norway) Olav Hansson	(Socialist Federal Republic of Yugoslavia) Primož Ulaga	(Austria) Ernst Vettori	
172	6	30 December 1986	(West Germany) Oberstdorf (Schattenbergschanze K115)	L _{098}	(Norway) Vegard Opaas	(West Germany) Thomas Klauser	(Austria) Andreas Felder	(Norway) Vegard Opaas	
173	7	1 January 1987	(West Germany) Garmisch-Pa (Große Olympiaschanze K107)	L _{099}	(West Germany) Andreas Bauer	(Finland) Jukka Kalso	(East Germany) Ulf Findeisen	(Norway) Vegard Opaas	
174	8	4 January 1987	(Austria) Innsbruck (Bergiselschanze K109)	L _{100}	(Socialist Federal Republic of Yugoslavia) Primož Ulaga	(Norway) Hroar Stjernen	(Czechoslovakia) Jiří Parma	(Norway) Vegard Opaas	
175	9	6 January 1987	(Austria) Bischofshofen (Paul-Ausserleitner K111)	L _{101}	(Finland) Tuomo Ylipulli	(Austria) Ernst Vettori	(Norway) Vegard Opaas	(Norway) Vegard Opaas	
35th Four Hills Tournament Overall (30 December 1986 – 6 January 1987)					(Austria) Ernst Vettori	(Norway) Vegard Opaas	(East Germany) Ulf Findeisen	4H Tournament	
176	10	10 January 1987	(Czechoslovakia) Štrbské Pleso (MS 1970 A K114, K88)	L _{102}	(East Germany) Ulf Findeisen	(Norway) Ole Gunnar Fidjestøl	(Austria) Ernst Vettori	(Norway) Vegard Opaas	
177	11	11 January 1987	(Czechoslovakia) Štrbské Pleso (MS 1970 A K114, K88)	N _{061}	(Norway) Vegard Opaas	(Austria) Andreas Felder	(Finland) Ari-Pekka Nikkola	(Norway) Vegard Opaas	
178	12	14 January 1987	(East Germany) Oberwiesenthal (Fichtelbergschanzen K90)	N _{062}	(Austria) Ernst Vettori	(Norway) Hroar Stjernen	(Czechoslovakia) Jiří Parma	(Austria) Ernst Vettori	
		16 January 1987	(East Germany) Oberhof (Rennsteigschanze K90)	N _{cnx}	cancelled due to strong wind and freezing cold			—	
179	13	24 January 1987	(Japan) Sapporo (Miyanomori K90) (Ōkurayama K115)	N _{063}	(Japan) Akira Satō	(Socialist Federal Republic of Yugoslavia) Miran Tepeš	(Japan) Hiroo Shima	(Austria) Ernst Vettori	
180	14	25 January 1987	(Japan) Sapporo (Miyanomori K90) (Ōkurayama K115)	L _{103}	(Socialist Federal Republic of Yugoslavia) Primož Ulaga	(Socialist Federal Republic of Yugoslavia) Miran Tepeš	(Norway) Steinar Bråten	(Austria) Ernst Vettori	
FIS Nordic World Ski Championships 1987 (15–20 February • (West Germany) Oberstdorf)
181	15	28 February 1987	(Finland) Lahti (Salpausselkä K88)	N _{064}	(Finland) Ari-Pekka Nikkola	(Czechoslovakia) Vladimír Podzimek	(Finland) Tuomo Ylipulli	(Norway) Vegard Opaas	
182	16	1 March 1987	(Finland) Lahti (Salpausselkä K88)	N _{065}	(Finland) Matti Nykänen	(Finland) Heikki Ylipulli	(Austria) Ernst Vettori	(Austria) Ernst Vettori	
183	17	4 March 1987	(Sweden) Örnsköldsvik (Paradiskullen K82)	N _{066}	(Finland) Ari-Pekka Nikkola	(Austria) Andreas Felder	(France) Didier Mollard	(Austria) Ernst Vettori	
184	18	8 March 1987	(Sweden) Falun (Lugnet K112)	L _{104}	(Finland) Matti Nykänen	(Finland) Pekka Suorsa	(Austria) Andreas Felder	(Austria) Ernst Vettori	
185	19	14 March 1987	(Socialist Federal Republic of Yugoslavia) Planica (Velikanka bratov Gorišek K185)	F _{015}	(Austria) Andreas Felder	(Norway) Ole Gunnar Fidjestøl	(West Germany) Thomas Klauser	(Austria) Ernst Vettori	
186	20	15 March 1987	(Socialist Federal Republic of Yugoslavia) Planica (Velikanka bratov Gorišek K185)	F _{016}	(Norway) Ole Gunnar Fidjestøl	(Socialist Federal Republic of Yugoslavia) Matjaž Zupan	(Poland) Piotr Fijas	(Norway) Vegard Opaas	
34th K.O.P. International Ski Flying Week Overall (14–15 March 1987)					(Austria) Andreas Felder	(Norway) Ole Gunnar Fidjestøl	(Socialist Federal Republic of Yugoslavia) Miran Tepeš	K.O.P.	
187	21	20 March 1987	(Norway) Oslo (Midtstubakken K85) (Holmenkollbakken K105)	N _{067}	(Norway) Vegard Opaas	(Norway) Hroar Stjernen	(Austria) Ernst Vettori	(Norway) Vegard Opaas	
188	22	21 March 1987	(Norway) Oslo (Midtstubakken K85) (Holmenkollbakken K105)	L _{105}	(Austria) Andreas Felder	(Finland) Ari-Pekka Nikkola	(Socialist Federal Republic of Yugoslavia) Miran Tepeš	(Norway) Vegard Opaas	
8th FIS World Cup Overall (6 December 1986 – 21 March 1987)					(Norway) Vegard Opaas	(Austria) Ernst Vettori	(Austria) Andreas Felder	World Cup Overall	

== Standings ==
=== Overall ===
Rank	after 22 events	Points
1	(Norway) Vegard Opaas	218
2	(Austria) Ernst Vettori	192
3	(Austria) Andreas Felder	177
4	(Socialist Federal Republic of Yugoslavia) Miran Tepeš	166
5	(Norway) Hroar Stjernen	159
6	(Finland) Matti Nykänen	133
7	(Socialist Federal Republic of Yugoslavia) Primož Ulaga	132
8	(Norway) Ole Gunnar Fidjestøl	131
9	(Czechoslovakia) Jiří Parma	129
10	(Finland) Ari-Pekka Nikkola	124

=== Nations Cup ===
Rank	after 22 events	Points
1	Norway	639
2	Finland	539
3	Austria	476
4	Yugoslavia	384
5	Czechoslovakia	240
6	East Germany	218
7	West Germany	191
8	Japan	134
9	Switzerland	89
10	France	29

=== Four Hills Tournament ===
Rank	after 4 events	Points
1	(Austria) Ernst Vettori	710.2
2	(Norway) Vegard Opaas	703.3
3	(East Germany) Ulf Findeisen	702.4
4	(Socialist Federal Republic of Yugoslavia) Miran Tepeš	691.4
5	(West Germany) Thomas Klauser	684.6
6	(West Germany) Andreas Bauer	684.4
7	(East Germany) Jens Weißflog	681.7
8	(Socialist Federal Republic of Yugoslavia) Primož Ulaga	676.9
9	(Socialist Federal Republic of Yugoslavia) Matjaž Debelak	674.2
10	(Switzerland) Gérard Balanche	665.9

== See also ==
- 1986–87 FIS Europa Cup (2nd level competition)
