= Chervyakov =

Chervyakov (masculine) or Chervyakova (feminine) is a Russian surname.

This surname is shared by the following people:

== Chervyakov ==
- Aleksandr Chervyakov (born 1957), Azerbaijani volleyball coach
- Aleksey Chervyakov (born 1984), Azerbaijani male volleyball player
- Alexander Chervyakov (1892–1937), one of the founders and eventually became the leader of the Communist Party of Belorussia
- Alexandr Chervyakov (born 1980), Kazakh biathlete
- Denis Chervyakov (born 1970), Russian ice hockey defenceman
- Sergey Chervyakov (born 1959), Soviet Nordic combined skier
