= Pekka Suorsa =

Finnish ski jumper (born 1967)

Personal information
- Full name: Pekka Antero Suorsa
- Nationality: Finland
- Born: 8 December 1967 (age 58) Kajaani, Finland
- Height: 1.75 m (5 ft 9 in)

Sport
- Sport: Skiing

World Cup career
- Seasons: 1984–1990
- Indiv. starts: 55
- Indiv. podiums: 5
- Indiv. wins: 2
Medal record
Men's ski jumping
Representing Finland
World Championships
| Gold medal – first place | 1987 Oberstdorf | Team LH |
- Updated on 10 February 2016

Pekka Antero Suorsa (born 8 December 1967) is a Finnish former ski jumper. He competed in the large hill event at the 1988 Winter Olympics.

== Career ==
He won a gold medal in the team large hill at the 1987 FIS Nordic World Ski Championships in Oberstdorf. Suorsa's earned two individual world cup career wins in 1985.

== World Cup ==
=== Standings ===
| Season | Overall | 4H |
|---|---|---|
| 1983/84 | — | 36 |
| 1984/85 | — | 54 |
| 1985/86 | 5 | 19 |
| 1986/87 | 17 | 59 |
| 1987/88 | 34 | 44 |
| 1988/89 | 21 | 88 |
| 1989/90 | — | — |

=== Wins ===
| No. | Season | Date | Location | Hill | Size |
|---|---|---|---|---|---|
| 1 | 1985/86 | 22 December 1985 | (France) Chamonix | Le Mont K95 | NH |
| 2 | 1985/86 | 30 December 1985 | (West Germany) Oberstdorf | Schattenbergschanze K115 | LH |
