= Steve Collins (ski jumper) =

Canadian ski jumper

Personal information
- Nationality: Canada
- Born: 13 March 1964 (age 62) Thunder Bay, Canada

Sport
- Sport: Skiing

World Cup career
- Seasons: 1980–1986; 1988; 1991–1992
- Indiv. starts: 63
- Indiv. podiums: 3
- Indiv. wins: 1

Achievements and titles
- Personal bests: 172 m (564 ft); Harrachov, 28-29 March 1980
- Updated on 10 February 2016

Steve Collins (born 13 March 1964) is a Canadian former ski jumper who was successful in the 1980s.

== Career ==
Steve began his World Cup jumping career on 27 December 1979 with a 10th-place finish at Cortina d'Ampezzo Italy on the Large Hill, followed 3 days later with a 66th-place finish on the K-115 hill at Schattenbergschanze in Oberstdorf, Germany. The following year, on 28 February 1980, he won the FIS Junior World Ski Championships at Örnsköldsvik in Sweden. In 1979 Collins won the national Tom Longboat Award that recognizes Aboriginal athletes for their outstanding contributions to sport in Canada. He once held the record for the longest jump on a 90-meter hill with 128.5 meters at Big Thunder in Thunder Bay on 15 December 1980. Along with team-mate Horst Bulau, Canada gained more than respectable results in the sport that had been dominated by Europeans. He left the World Cup circuit in 1988, but returned to his home hill in Thunder Bay for both hills in 1990 and his final World Cup appearance on 12 February 1991.

== World Cup ==
=== Standings ===
| Season | Overall | 4H | SF |
|---|---|---|---|
| 1979/80 | 12 | 42 | N/A |
| 1980/81 | 15 | 37 | N/A |
| 1981/82 | 55 | 73 | N/A |
| 1982/83 | 32 | 37 | N/A |
| 1983/84 | 69 | 20 | N/A |
| 1984/85 | 27 | — | N/A |
| 1985/86 | 20 | 49 | N/A |
| 1987/88 | 42 | 123 | N/A |
| 1990/91 | — | — | — |
| 1991/92 | — | — | — |

=== Wins ===
| No. | Season | Date | Location | Hill | Size |
|---|---|---|---|---|---|
| 1 | 1979/80 | 9 March 1980 | (Finland) Lahti | Salpausselkä K113 | LH |

=== Additional podiums ===
| Rank | Season | Date | Location | Hill | Size |
|---|---|---|---|---|---|
| 3rd | 1980/81 | 21 February 1981 | (Canada) Thunder Bay | Big Thunder, K-90 | NH |
| 3rd | 1985/86 | 15 December 1985 | (United States) Lake Placid | MacKenzie Intervale K86 | NH |

== Olympics ==
| Year | Location | Rank (Normal Hill) | Rank (Large Hill) |
|---|---|---|---|
| 1980 | Lake Placid | 28 | 9 |
| 1984 | Sarajevo | 25 | 36 |
| 1988 | Calgary | 13 | 35 |
