= Ernst Vettori =

Austrian ski jumper (born 1964)

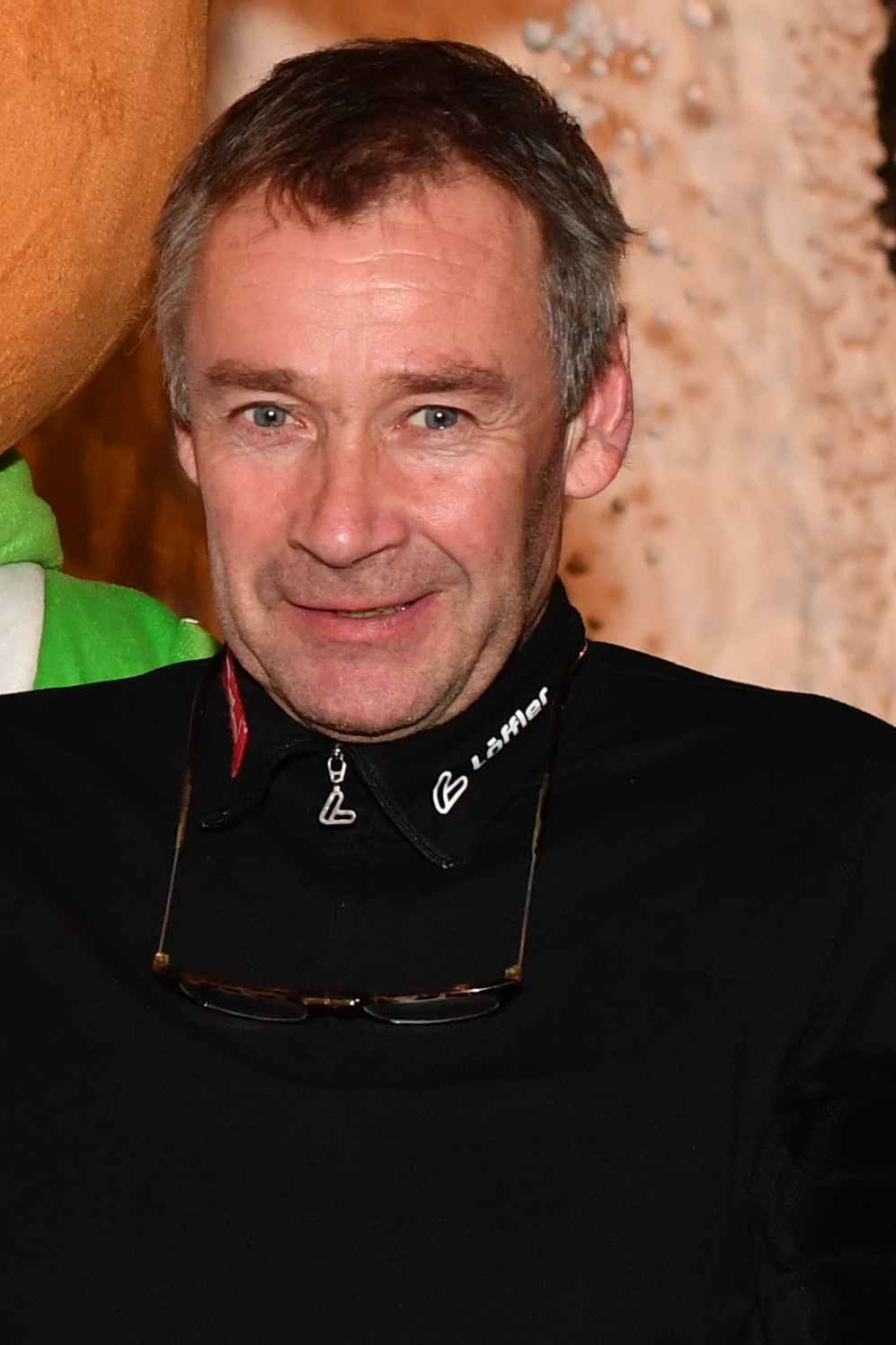
- Vettori 2016

Personal information
- Nationality: Austria
- Born: 25 June 1964 (age 62) Hall in Tirol, Austria
- Height: 168 cm (5 ft 6 in)

Sport
- Sport: Skiing

World Cup career
- Seasons: 1981–1994
- Indiv. starts: 189
- Indiv. podiums: 54
- Indiv. wins: 15
- Team starts: 2
- Team podiums: 2
- Team wins: 2
- Four Hills titles: 2 (1986, 1987)
Medal record
Men's ski jumping
Olympic Games
Gold medal – first place	1992 Albertville	Individual NH
Silver medal – second place	1992 Albertville	Team LH
FIS Nordic World Ski Championships
Gold medal – first place	1991 Val di Fiemme	Team LH
Silver medal – second place	1985 Seefeld	Team LH
Bronze medal – third place	1987 Oberstdorf	Individual LH
Bronze medal – third place	1987 Oberstdorf	Team LH
Bronze medal – third place	1993 Falun	Team LH
- Updated on 10 February 2016

Ernst Vettori (born 25 June 1964) is an Austrian former ski jumper.

== Career ==
He won the Four Hills Tournament twice (1985/1986 and 1986/1987). At the 1992 Winter Olympics, he won gold from the normal hill, and silver in the team competition.

Vettori won five medals at the FIS Nordic World Ski Championships with gold in the team large hill (1991), silver in the team large hill (1985), and bronzes in individual large hill (1987) and team large hill (1987 and 1993). He also won the ski jumping competition at the Holmenkollen ski festival twice (1986 and 1991).

Vettori won the Holmenkollen medal in 1991 (shared with Vegard Ulvang, Trond Einar Elden, and Jens Weißflog). He is now marketing director for the Austrian Ski Association.

== World Cup ==
=== Standings ===
Season	Overall	4H	SF
1980/81	26	73	N/A
1981/82	24	31	N/A
1982/83	13	62	N/A
1983/84	19	13	N/A
1984/85	3rd place, bronze medalist(s)	4	N/A
1985/86	2nd place, silver medalist(s)	1st place, gold medalist(s)	N/A
1986/87	2nd place, silver medalist(s)	1st place, gold medalist(s)	N/A
1987/88	5	11	N/A
1988/89	8	7	N/A
1989/90	2nd place, silver medalist(s)	4	N/A
1990/91	9	4	—
1991/92	4	27	—
1992/93	23	14	—
1993/94	39	43	—

=== Wins ===
No.	Season	Date	Location	Hill	Size
1	1984/85	30 December 1984	(West Germany) Oberstdorf	Schattenbergschanze K115	LH
2	1984/85	13 February 1985	(Switzerland) St. Moritz	Olympiaschanze K94	NH
3	1985/86	6 January 1986	(Austria) Bischofshofen	Paul-Ausserleitner-Schanze K111	LH
4	1985/86	19 January 1986	(East Germany) Oberwiesenthal	Fichtelbergschanzen K90	NH
5	1985/86	21 February 1986	(Switzerland) Gstaad	Mattenschanze K88	NH
6	1985/86	16 March 1986	(Norway) Oslo	Holmenkollbakken K105	LH
7	1985/86	23 March 1986	(Socialist Federal Republic of Yugoslavia) Planica	Bloudkova velikanka K120	LH
8	1986/87	14 December 1986	(United States) Lake Placid	MacKenzie Intervale K86	NH
9	1986/87	15 January 1987	(East Germany) Oberwiesenthal	Fichtelbergschanzen K90	NH
10	1987/88	17 January 1988	(Italy) Gallio	Trampolino di Pakstall K95	NH
11	1989/90	9 December 1989	(United States) Lake Placid	MacKenzie Intervale K114	LH
12	1989/90	16 December 1989	(Japan) Sapporo	Miyanomori K90	NH
13	1990/91	17 March 1991	(Norway) Oslo	Holmenkollbakken K105	LH
14	1991/92	2 December 1991	(Canada) Thunder Bay	Big Thunder K120	LH
15	1991/92	4 March 1992	(Sweden) Örnsköldsvik	Paradiskullen K90	NH
