= Hallstabacken =

Ski jumping hill in Sollefteå, Sweden

Coordinates: 63.1579°N 17.2467°E

- Location: Sollefteå; Sweden
- Opened: 1934
- Renovated: 1960, 1986, 1993

Size
- K–point: K-80, K-108
- Hill size: HS 92, HS 120
- Hill record: 121 m (395 ft) (Austria) Thomas Morgenstern (6 February 2003)

Hallstabacken are ski jumping hills in Sollefteå, Sweden.

== History ==
It was built from 1930-1933 and owned by Sollefteå GIF. It was opened on 25 February 1934. It hosted FIS Nordic World Ski Championships 1934 and one FIS Ski jumping World Cup event in 1990 on normal hill. Thomas Morgenstern holds the hill record.

== World Cup ==
=== Men ===
Date	Size	Winner	Second	Third
11 Mar 1990	K-107	(Czechoslovakia) Pavel Ploc	(Finland) Ari-Pekka Nikkola	(Italy) Virginio Lunardi
