= Karetnikov =

Karetnikov (Russian: Каретников, from карета meaning carriage) is a Russian masculine surname. Its feminine counterpart is Karetnikova. It may refer to:

- Ivan Karetnikov (born 1942), Soviet swimmer
- Nikolai Karetnikov (1930–1994), Russian composer
- Valerji Karetnikov (born 1963), Soviet ski jumper

== See also ==
- 4685 Karetnikov asteroid
