= Kustov =

Kustov (Russian: Кустов, from куст meaning bush) is a Russian masculine surname, its feminine counterpart is Kustova. Notable people with the surname include:

- Darya Kustova (born 1986), Belarusian tennis player
- Pavel Kustov (born 1965), Russian ski jumper
