= Antonio Lacedelli =

Italian former ski jumper

Personal information
- Full name: Antonio Lacedelli

Sport
- Sport: Skiing

World Cup career
- Seasons: 1984–1990
- Updated on 30 Mar 2015

Antonio Lacedelli is an Italian former ski jumper.

== Career ==
He made his world cup debut on 30 December 1983 in Oberstdorf. He took 8th place in overall of 1985-86 Four Hills Tournament.

== World Cup ==
=== Standings ===
Season	Overall	4H
1983-84	–	93
1984-85	–	87
1985-86	25	8
1986-87	54	44
1987-88	–	78
1988-89	45	59
1989-90	–	–
