= Lacedelli =

Lacedelli is a surname. Notable people with the surname include:

- Antonio Lacedelli, Italian ski jumper
- Giulia Lacedelli (born 1971), Italian curler
- Lino Lacedelli (1925–2009), Italian mountaineer
- Maria-Grazzia Lacedelli (née Constantini, born 1943), Italian curler
- Roberto Lacedelli (1919–1983), Italian alpine skier
