= Aschbergschanze =

Ski jumping hill in Klingenthal, Germany

Coordinates: 50.3911°N 12.4807°E

Große Aschbergschanze
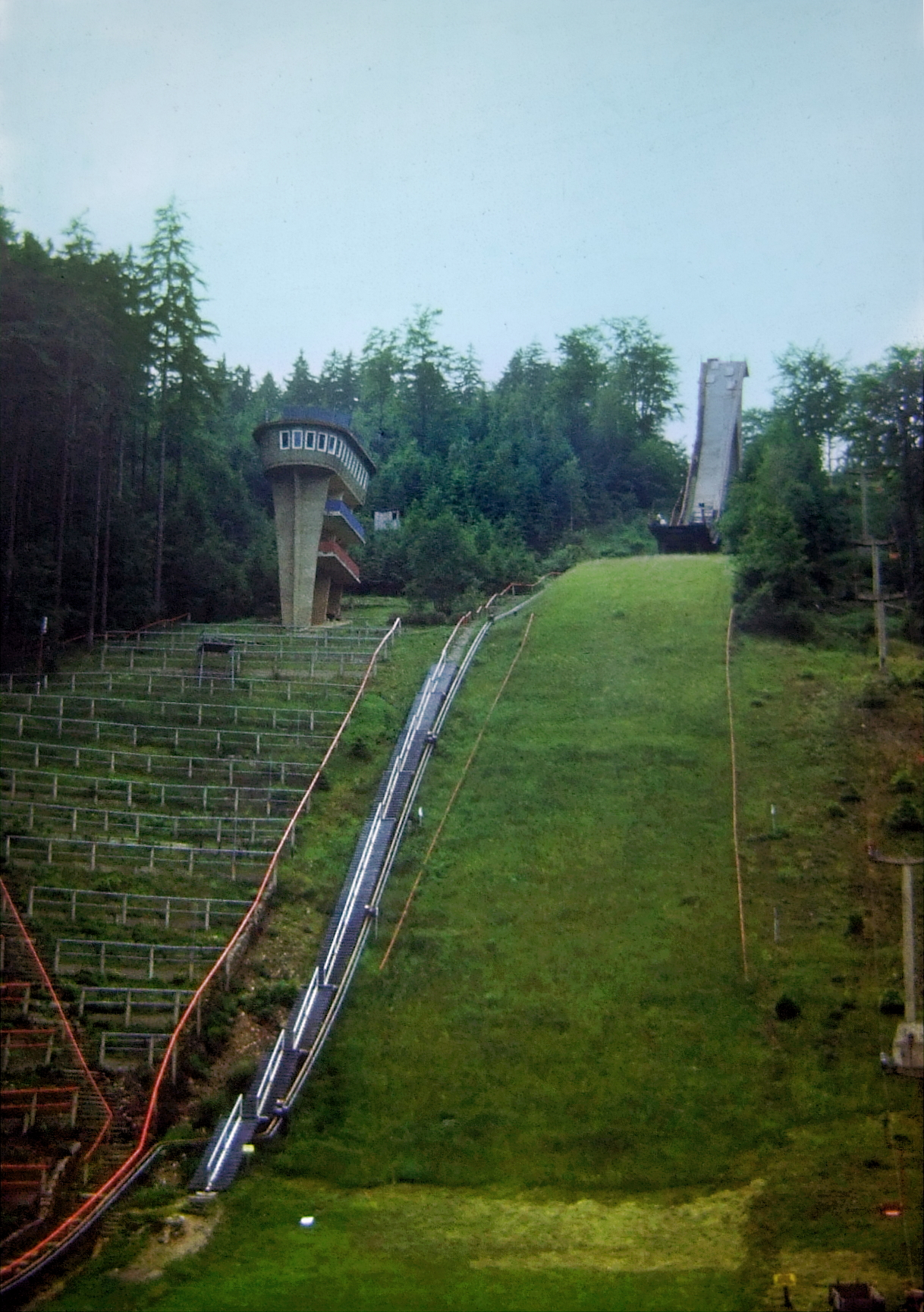
- Location: Klingenthal; Germany
- Opened: 1959
- Expanded: ±
- Closed: 1990

Size
- K–point: K-102
- Hill record: 107.5 m (353 ft) (East Germany) Jens Weißflog (1985)

Große Aschbergschanze was a ski jumping large hill in Klingenthal, Germany.

== History ==
The hill was opened in 1959 and owned by SC Traktor Oberwiesenthal. It hosted an FIS Ski jumping World Cup event in 1986. Jens Weißflog holds the hill record. It was closed in 1990. In 2006 it was replaced by a new ski jumping venue, Vogtlandarena, at another site in Klingenthal.
