= Franz Neuländtner =

Austrian ski jumper

Personal information
- Nationality: Austria
- Born: 29 January 1966 (age 60) Höhnhart, Austria
- Height: 1.84 m (6 ft 1/2 in)

Sport
- Sport: Skiing

World Cup career
- Seasons: 1983–1993
- Indiv. starts: 72
- Indiv. podiums: 6
- Indiv. wins: 2

Achievements and titles
- Personal best: 180.0 m
Medal record
Representing Austria
Men's ski jumping
World Championships
Bronze medal – third place	1987 Oberstdorf	Team LH
Men's ski flying
World Championships
Silver medal – second place	1986 Bad-Mittendorf	Individual
- Updated on 10 February 2016

Franz Neuländter (born 29 January 1966) is an Austrian former ski jumper.

== Career ==
He won a bronze medal in the team large hill event at the 1987 FIS Nordic World Ski Championships in Oberstdorf and finished 6th in the individual large hill in the 1989 championships. He also had two individual victories in his career (1989, 1990). He attained his personal best distance of 180.0 m on 7 March 1986 on the Kulm-Skiflugschanze slope in Bad Mitterndorf, which earned him a silver medal at the FIS Ski Flying World Championships 1986.

== World Cup ==
=== Standings ===
Season	Overall	4H	SF
1982/83	—	91	N/A
1983/84	—	71	N/A
1984/85	32	39	N/A
1985/86	4	2nd place, silver medalist(s)	N/A
1986/87	54	23	N/A
1987/88	—	72	N/A
1988/89	17	19	N/A
1989/90	20	20	N/A
1990/91	28	83	19
1991/92	—	65	—
1992/93	—	77	—

=== Wins ===
No.	Season	Date	Location	Hill	Size
1	1985/86	15 December 1985	(United States) Lake Placid	MacKenzie Intervale K86	NH
2	1989/90	3 March 1990	(Finland) Lahti	Salpausselkä K114	LH
