= 1987–88 FIS Ski Jumping World Cup =

Ski jumping championship season

1987–88 World Cup
Winners
- Overall: (Finland) Matti Nykänen
- Four Hills Tournament: (Finland) Matti Nykänen
- Swiss Tournament: (Finland) Matti Nykänen
- Nations Cup: Finland

Competitions
- Venues: 15
- Individual: 20
- Cancelled: 2

The 1987–88 FIS Ski Jumping World Cup was the 9th World Cup season in ski jumping.

Season began in Thunder Bay, Canada on 5 December 1987 and finished in Planica, Yugoslavia on 27 March 1988. The individual World Cup overall winner was Finnish ski jumper Matti Nykänen (for the 4th and last time in his career) dominating the season with 10 WC wins, double olympic gold and bronze at Ski Flying World Champ.; Nations Cup was taken by Team of Finland.

20 men's individual events on 15 different venues in 10 countries were held on three different continents (Europe, Asia and North America). Two competition were cancelled this season.

Peaks of the season were Winter Olympics, FIS Ski Flying World Championships, Four Hills Tournament, Bohemia Tournament (cancelled) and Swiss Tournament.

Two events (Harrachov and Liberec), counting for Bohemia Tournament were cancelled.

== Map of world cup hosts ==
Europe
West Germany	Austria Asia	North America

== Calendar ==
=== Men's Individual ===
N – normal hill / L – large hill
All	No.	Date	Place (Hill)	Size	Winner	Second	Third	Overall leader (Note: Yellow bib for the overall leader was introduced later, from the 1988/89 season onwards.)	R.
189	1	5 December 1987	(Canada) Thunder Bay (Big Thunder K89, K120)	N _{068}	(Finland) Matti Nykänen	(Czechoslovakia) Pavel Ploc	(Austria) Ernst Vettori	(Finland) Matti Nykänen	
190	2	6 December 1987	(Canada) Thunder Bay (Big Thunder K89, K120)	L _{106}	(Finland) Matti Nykänen	(East Germany) Jens Weißflog	(Norway) Vegard Opaas	(Finland) Matti Nykänen	
191	3	12 December 1987	(United States) Lake Placid (MacKenzie Int. K114, K86)	L _{107}	(Czechoslovakia) Pavel Ploc	(West Germany) Dieter Thoma	(West Germany) Andreas Bauer	(Czechoslovakia) Pavel Ploc	
192	4	13 December 1987	(United States) Lake Placid (MacKenzie Int. K114, K86)	N _{069}	(Czechoslovakia) Pavel Ploc	(Czechoslovakia) Jiří Parma	(Norway) Vegard Opaas	(Czechoslovakia) Pavel Ploc	
193	5	19 December 1987	(Japan) Sapporo (Miyanomori K90) (Ōkurayama K115)	N _{070}	(Finland) Matti Nykänen	(Austria) Werner Schuster	(Czechoslovakia) Martin Švagerko	(Czechoslovakia) Pavel Ploc	
194	6	20 December 1987	(Japan) Sapporo (Miyanomori K90) (Ōkurayama K115)	L _{108}	(Finland) Matti Nykänen	(Czechoslovakia) Jiří Parma	(Sweden) Staffan Tällberg	(Finland) Matti Nykänen	
195	7	30 December 1987	(West Germany) Oberstdorf (Schattenbergschanze K115)	L _{109}	(Czechoslovakia) Pavel Ploc	(Finland) Matti Nykänen	(Sweden) Staffan Tällberg	(Czechoslovakia) Pavel Ploc	
196	8	1 January 1988	(West Germany) Garmisch-Pa (Große Olympiaschanze K107)	L _{110}	(Finland) Matti Nykänen	(Sweden) Staffan Tällberg	(East Germany) Jens Weißflog	(Finland) Matti Nykänen	
197	9	4 January 1988	(Austria) Innsbruck (Bergiselschanze K109)	L _{111}	(Finland) Matti Nykänen	(West Germany) Andreas Bauer	(East Germany) Jens Weißflog	(Finland) Matti Nykänen	
198	10	6 January 1988	(Austria) Bischofshofen (Paul-Ausserleitner K111)	L _{112}	(Finland) Matti Nykänen	(Socialist Federal Republic of Yugoslavia) Primož Ulaga	(Norway) Ole C. Eidhammer	(Finland) Matti Nykänen	
36th Four Hills Tournament Overall (30 December 1987 – 6 January 1988)					(Finland) Matti Nykänen	(East Germany) Jens Weißflog	(Czechoslovakia) Jiří Parma	4H Tournament	
		9 January 1988	(Czechoslovakia) Liberec (Ještěd A K120)	L _{cnx}	cancelled due to high temperatures and lack of snow			—	
		10 January 1988	(Czechoslovakia) Harrachov (Čerťák K120)	L _{cnx}	cancelled due to high temperatures and lack of snow			—	
Bohemia Tournament Overall (9 – 10 January 1988)					cancelled due to high temperatures and lack of snow			Bohemia Tournament	
199	11	17 January 1988	(Italy) Gallio (Trampolino di Pakstall K95)	N _{071}	(Austria) Ernst Vettori	(Socialist Federal Republic of Yugoslavia) Primož Ulaga	(Czechoslovakia) Jiří Parma	(Finland) Matti Nykänen	
200	12	20 January 1988	(Switzerland) St. Moritz (Olympiaschanze K94)	N _{072}	(Finland) Matti Nykänen	(Norway) Erik Johnsen	(East Germany) Remo Lederer	(Finland) Matti Nykänen	
201	13	22 January 1988	(Switzerland) Gstaad (Mattenschanze K88)	N _{073}	(Czechoslovakia) Pavel Ploc	(Socialist Federal Republic of Yugoslavia) Miran Tepeš	(East Germany) Jens Weißflog	(Finland) Matti Nykänen	
202	14	24 January 1988	(Switzerland) Engelberg (Gross-Titlis-Schanze K120)	L _{113}	(East Germany) Jens Weißflog	(Finland) Matti Nykänen	(Austria) Andreas Felder	(Finland) Matti Nykänen	
23rd Swiss Tournament Overall (20 – 24 February 1988)					(Finland) Matti Nykänen	(Socialist Federal Republic of Yugoslavia) Miran Tepeš	(Austria) Ernst Vettori	Swiss Tournament	
1988 Winter Olympics (14 – 23 February • (Canada) Calgary)
203	15	4 March 1988	(Finland) Lahti (Salpausselkä K90, K114)	N _{074}	(Finland) Matti Nykänen	(Sweden) Jan Boklöv	(Norway) Erik Johnsen	(Finland) Matti Nykänen	
204	16	6 March 1988	(Finland) Lahti (Salpausselkä K90, K114)	L _{114}	(Finland) Matti Nykänen	(Sweden) Jan Boklöv	(Norway) Erik Johnsen	(Finland) Matti Nykänen	
FIS Ski Flying World Championships 1988 (13 March • (West Germany) Oberstdorf)
205	17	18 March 1988	(Norway) Meldal (Kløvsteinbakken K105)	L _{115}	(Norway) Erik Johnsen	(Austria) Oliver Strohmaier	(Czech Republic) Jiří Malec	(Finland) Matti Nykänen	
206	18	20 March 1988	(Norway) Oslo (Holmenkollbakken K105)	L _{116}	(Norway) Erik Johnsen	(Norway) Ole G. Fidjestøl	(Austria) Günther Stranner	(Finland) Matti Nykänen	
207	19	26 March 1988	(Socialist Federal Republic of Yugoslavia) Planica (Srednja Bloudkova K90) (Bloudkova velikanka K120)	N _{075}	(Socialist Federal Republic of Yugoslavia) Primož Ulaga	(Czechoslovakia) Pavel Ploc	(Austria) Ernst Vettori	(Finland) Matti Nykänen	
208	20	27 March 1988	(Socialist Federal Republic of Yugoslavia) Planica (Srednja Bloudkova K90) (Bloudkova velikanka K120)	L _{117}	(Socialist Federal Republic of Yugoslavia) Primož Ulaga	(Socialist Federal Republic of Yugoslavia) Rajko Lotrič	(France) Didier Mollard	(Finland) Matti Nykänen	
9th FIS World Cup Overall (5 December 1987 – 27 March 1988)					(Finland) Matti Nykänen	(Czechoslovakia) Pavel Ploc	(Socialist Federal Republic of Yugoslavia) Primož Ulaga	World Cup Overall	

== Standings ==
=== Overall ===
Rank	after 20 events	Points
1	(Finland) Matti Nykänen	282
2	(Czechoslovakia) Pavel Ploc	187
3	(Socialist Federal Republic of Yugoslavia) Primož Ulaga	127
4	(Czechoslovakia) Jiří Parma	125
5	(Austria) Ernst Vettori	114
6	(East Germany) Jens Weißflog	111
7	(Norway) Erik Johnsen	106
8	(Socialist Federal Republic of Yugoslavia) Miran Tepeš	97
9	(Norway) Ole Gunnar Fidjestøl	82
10	(Sweden) Jan Boklöv	64

=== Nations Cup ===
Rank	after 20 events	Points
1	Finland	541
2	Czechoslovakia	430
3	Norway	412
4	Austria	333
5	Yugoslavia	310
6	West Germany	180
7	Sweden	165
8	East Germany	153
9	Switzerland	77
10	Canada	68

=== Four Hills Tournament ===
Rank	after 4 events	Points
1	(Finland) Matti Nykänen	887.7
2	(East Germany) Jens Weißflog	788.7
3	(Czechoslovakia) Jiří Parma	767.7
4	(Switzerland) Christian Hauswirth	763.5
5	(Austria) Franz Wiegele	752.7
6	(Sweden) Staffan Tällberg	751.5
7	(Socialist Federal Republic of Yugoslavia) Miran Tepeš	748.2
8	(West Germany) Andreas Bauer	741.0
9	(Finland) Tuomo Ylipulli	731.5
10	(Finland) Jari Puikkonen	726.3

=== Swiss Tournament ===
Rank	after 3 events	Points
1	(Finland) Matti Nykänen	641.5
2	(Socialist Federal Republic of Yugoslavia) Miran Tepeš	635.5
3	(Austria) Ernst Vettori	621.3
4	(East Germany) Jens Weißflog	621.2
5	(Czechoslovakia) Pavel Ploc	619.1
6	(Norway) Ole Gunnar Fidjestøl	616.1
7	(Austria) Andreas Felder	600.8
8	(Austria) Franz Wiegele	587.5
9	(West Germany) Josef Heumann	583.3
10	(Norway) Ole C. Eidhammer	579.3

== See also ==
- 1987–88 FIS Europa Cup (2nd level competition)
