= Valerji Karetnikov =

Soviet ski jumper (born 1963)

Personal information
- Full name: Valerji Karetnikov
- Born: 1963 (age 62–63)

Sport
- Sport: Skiing

World Cup career
- Seasons: 1983–1984; 1986–1987
- Indiv. podiums: 1
- Updated on 30 Mar 2015

Valerji Karetnikov (born 1963) is a Soviet former ski jumper.
