= Anssi Nieminen =

Finnish ski jumper

Personal information
- Full name: Anssi Nieminen
- Born: Jyväskylä, Finland

Sport
- Sport: Skiing

World Cup career
- Seasons: 1986; 1988; 1990–1993
- Indiv. podiums: 2
- Updated on 30 March 2015

Anssi Nieminen is a Finnish former ski jumper.
