= Jens Weißflog =

German former ski jumper (born 1964)

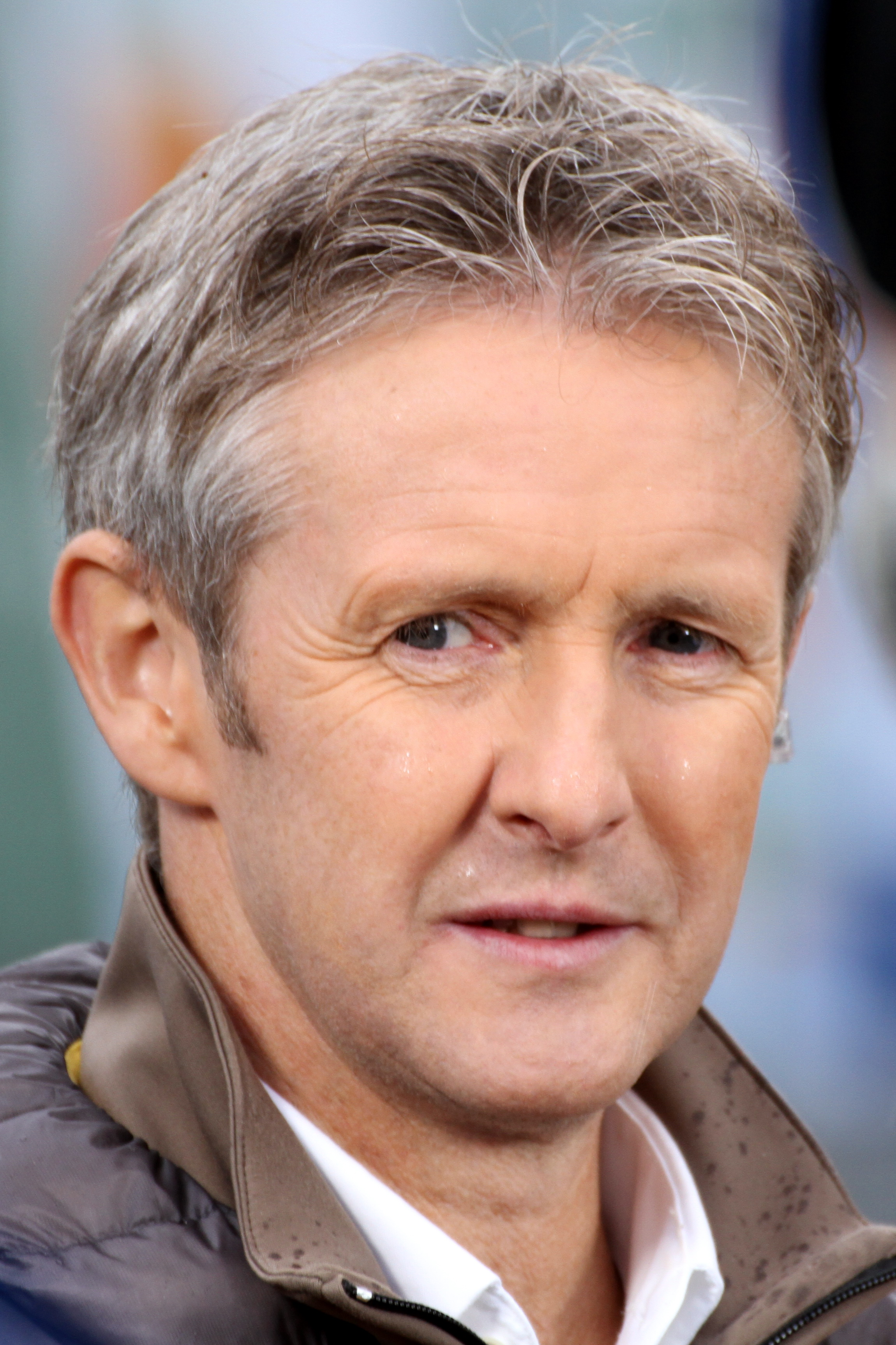
- Jens Weißflog (2017)

Personal information
- Nationality: East Germany (1980–90); Germany (1990–1996)
- Born: 21 July 1964 (age 62) Erlabrunn, East Germany
- Height: 1.70 m (5 ft 7 in)

Sport
- Sport: Skiing

World Cup career
- Seasons: 1981; 1983–1996
- Indiv. starts: 191
- Indiv. podiums: 73
- Indiv. wins: 33
- Team starts: 9
- Team podiums: 6
- Team wins: 1
- Overall titles: 1 (1984)
- Four Hills titles: 4 (1984, 1985, 1991, 1996)

Achievements and titles
- Personal bests: 201 m (659 ft); Kulm, 9–11 February 1996
Medal record
Men's ski jumping
Olympic Games
Gold medal – first place	1984 Sarajevo	Individual NH
Gold medal – first place	1994 Lillehammer	Individual LH
Gold medal – first place	1994 Lillehammer	Team LH
Silver medal – second place	1984 Sarajevo	Individual LH
FIS Nordic World Ski Championships
Gold medal – first place	1985 Seefeld	Individual NH
Gold medal – first place	1989 Lahti	Individual NH
Silver medal – second place	1984 Engelberg	Team LH
Silver medal – second place	1989 Lahti	Individual LH
Silver medal – second place	1995 Thunder Bay	Team LH
Bronze medal – third place	1985 Seefeld	Team LH
Bronze medal – third place	1991 Val di Fiemme	Individual LH
Bronze medal – third place	1991 Val di Fiemme	Team LH
Bronze medal – third place	1993 Falun	Individual LH
Men's ski flying
FIS Ski Flying World Championships
Silver medal – second place	1985 Planica	Individual
Bronze medal – third place	1990 Vikersund	Individual
- Updated on 10 February 2016

Jens Weißflog (German pronunciation: [jɛns ˈvaɪsfloːk]; born 21 July 1964) is an East German and later German former ski jumper. He is one of the best and most successful ski jumpers in the history of the sport. He is a two time olympic and nordic world ski champion; also overall world winner.

== Career ==
Weißflog was born in Erlabrunn (now a part of Breitenbrunn) in Saxony.

=== Olympics and Four Hills Tournament ===
As a 19-year-old he won the Four Hills Tournament for East Germany in 1983/84. Weißflog was known as "Floh" (flea in German) due to his slight stature and his light body. That same winter he won the combined World Cup and later the normal hill event at the 1984 Winter Olympics in Sarajevo. The following winter was dominated by Weißflog and the outstanding Finn Matti Nykänen.

The most remarkable part of his career is that he competed at the top level for twelve years. Neither the regime change from East Germany to the unified Germany in late 1990, nor the change in ski jumping techniques from the parallel technique to the V-style around 1993 stopped his success.

In 1994 he won two gold medals in the individual large hill and team large hill events at the 1994 Winter Olympics in Lillehammer, ten years after his first Olympic victory. Controversially, he committed one of the most unsporting acts in winter sports history, when he congratulated Japan's last team jumper with the victory, before the competition was over. The Japanese jumper failed miserably with his jump, while Weissflog did not, and thus Germany won the gold. In the next event, Weissflog was duly booed by approximately 40 000 spectators, who all regarded this former act as most unfair play, and a very dirty move. Weissflog responded by flipping the bird to the spectators, who did not warm further to him.

He finished his career in 1996 by becoming the first ski jumper to win the combined Four Hills Tournament four times. Only the Finn Janne Ahonen has surpassed that record by winning the Four Hills Tournament five times. He had also earned five-second-place finishes in the competition over the course of his career. After this achievement he retired from professional sport.

=== World Championships ===
At the FIS Nordic World Ski Championships, Weißflog won two golds in the individual normal hill (1985, 1989), three silvers in the individual large hill (1989) and team large hill (1984 and 1995), and four bronzes in the individual large hill (1991, 1993) and team large hill (1985 and 1991). He also won two medals at the FIS Ski Flying World Championships with a silver in 1985 and a bronze in 1990.

Weißflog also won the ski jumping competition at the Holmenkollen ski festival twice (1989, 1990). He was awarded the Holmenkollen medal in 1991 (shared with Vegard Ulvang, Trond Einar Elden, and Ernst Vettori).

== Life after the career ==
Today, Jens Weißflog owns a hotel in his home town of Oberwiesenthal and is the main ski jump commentator for German television station ZDF.

== World Cup ==
=== Standings ===
Season	Overall	4H	SF	JP
1980/81	—	110	N/A	N/A
1982/83	16	2nd place, silver medalist(s)	N/A	N/A
1983/84	1st place, gold medalist(s)	1st place, gold medalist(s)	N/A	N/A
1984/85	4	1st place, gold medalist(s)	N/A	N/A
1985/86	16	22	N/A	N/A
1986/87	11	7	N/A	N/A
1987/88	6	2nd place, silver medalist(s)	N/A	N/A
1988/89	2nd place, silver medalist(s)	2nd place, silver medalist(s)	N/A	N/A
1989/90	6	3rd place, bronze medalist(s)	N/A	N/A
1990/91	8	1st place, gold medalist(s)	19	N/A
1991/92	38	39	—	N/A
1992/93	11	3rd place, bronze medalist(s)	—	N/A
1993/94	2nd place, silver medalist(s)	2nd place, silver medalist(s)	—	N/A
1994/95	6	12	14	N/A
1995/96	4	1st place, gold medalist(s)	8	4

=== Wins ===
No.	Season	Date	Location	Hill	Size
1	1982/83	6 January 1983	(Austria) Bischofshofen	Paul-Ausserleitner-Schanze K109	LH
2	1983/84	1 January 1984	(West Germany) Garmisch-Partenkirchen	Große Olympiaschanze K107	LH
3	1983/84	4 January 1984	(Austria) Innsbruck	Bergiselschanze K106	LH
4	1983/84	6 January 1984	(Austria) Bischofshofen	Paul-Ausserleitner-Schanze K111	LH
5	1983/84	11 January 1984	(Italy) Cortina d’Ampezzo	Trampolino Italia K92	NH
6	1983/84	15 January 1984	(Czechoslovakia) Liberec	Ještěd A K115	LH
7	1983/84	12 February 1984	(Socialist Federal Republic of Yugoslavia) Sarajevo (OWG)	Igman K90	NH
8	1983/84	24 March 1984	(Socialist Federal Republic of Yugoslavia) Planica	Srednja Bloudkova K90	NH
9	1984/85	1 January 1985	(West Germany) Garmisch-Partenkirchen	Große Olympiaschanze K107	LH
10	1984/85	17 February 1985	(Switzerland) Engelberg	Gross-Titlis-Schanze K120	LH
11	1986/87	6 December 1986	(Canada) Thunder Bay	Big Thunder K89	NH
12	1987/88	24 January 1988	(Switzerland) Engelberg	Gross-Titlis-Schanze K120	LH
13	1988/89	22 January 1989	(East Germany) Oberhof	Rennsteigschanze K90	NH
14	1988/89	5 March 1989	(Norway) Oslo	Holmenkollbakken K105	LH
15	1988/89	8 March 1989	(Sweden) Örnsköldsvik	Paradiskullen K82	NH
16	1988/89	25 March 1989	(Socialist Federal Republic of Yugoslavia) Planica	Srednja Bloudkova K90	NH
17	1988/89	26 March 1989	(Socialist Federal Republic of Yugoslavia) Planica	Bloudkova velikanka K120	LH
18	1989/90	17 December 1989	(Japan) Sapporo	Ōkurayama K115	LH
19	1989/90	1 January 1990	(West Germany) Garmisch-Partenkirchen	Große Olympiaschanze K107	LH
20	1989/90	17 January 1990	(Poland) Zakopane	Wielka Krokiew K116	LH
21	1990/91	30 December 1990	(Germany) Oberstdorf	Schattenbergschanze K115	LH
22	1990/91	1 January 1991	(Germany) Garmisch-Partenkirchen	Große Olympiaschanze K107	LH
23	1993/94	12 December 1993	(Slovenia) Planica	Bloudkova velikanka K120	LH
24	1993/94	14 December 1993	(Italy) Predazzo	Trampolino dal Ben K90 (night)	NH
25	1993/94	30 December 1993	(Germany) Oberstdorf	Schattenbergschanze K115	LH
26	1993/94	22 January 1994	(Japan) Sapporo	Miyanomori K90	NH
27	1993/94	23 January 1994	(Japan) Sapporo	Ōkurayama K115	LH
28	1993/94	5 March 1994	(Finland) Lahti	Salpausselkä K90	NH
29	1993/94	27 March 1994	(Canada) Thunder Bay	Big Thunder K90	NH
30	1994/95	29 January 1995	(Finland) Lahti	Salpausselkä K114	LH
31	1995/96	6 January 1996	(Austria) Bischofshofen	Paul-Ausserleitner-Schanze K120	LH
32	1995/96	20 January 1996	(Japan) Sapporo	Miyanomori K90	NH
33	1995/96	17 February 1996	(United States) Iron Mountain	Pine Mountain K120	LH

Awards
Preceded by Uwe Hohn	East German Sportsman of the Year; 1985	Succeeded by Olaf Ludwig
