= Hroar Stjernen =

Norwegian ski jumper

Personal information
- Nationality: Norway
- Born: 11 February 1961 (age 65) Sprova, Norway

Sport
- Sport: Skiing

World Cup career
- Seasons: 1984–1989
- Indiv. starts: 51
- Indiv. podiums: 5
- Indiv. wins: 1
Medal record
Men's ski jumping
World Championships
Silver medal – second place	1987 Oberstdorf	Team LH
- Updated on 10 February 2016

Hroar Stjernen (born 11 February 1961) is a Norwegian former ski jumper representing Sprova IL and Trønderhopp.

== Career ==
He won the silver medal in the team large hill event at the 1987 FIS Nordic World Ski Championships in Oberstdorf and finished fourth in the individual normal hill at those same championships.

Stjernen's lone individual World Cup victory came at Bischofshofen in 1985. He later worked as national team coach for the Norwegian ski jumpers between 1998 and 2002, but was criticized for poor results, resulting in his dismissal in January 2002. This dismissal would have no impact upon the team at the 2002 Winter Olympics in Salt Lake City, as the national team went home without a medal for the second straight time at the Olympics. He works today in Trønder-Avisa.

He is the father of ski jumper Andreas Stjernen. On 20 December 2011, Rosenborg BK announced that Hroar Stjernen will be their next Managing Director after Nils Skutle, starting 1 April 2012.

== World Cup ==
=== Standings ===
Season	Overall	4H
1983/84	—	—
1984/85	13	9
1985/86	17	4
1986/87	5	11
1987/88	27	15
1988/89	—	46

=== Wins ===
No.	Season	Date	Location	Hill	Size
1	1984/85	6 January 1985	(Austria) Bischofshofen	Paul-Ausserleitner-Schanze K111	LH
