= Franz Wiegele =

Austrian former ski jumper (born 1965)

Personal information
- Full name: Franz Wiegele
- Born: 23 November 1965 (age 60) Villach, Austria

Sport
- Sport: Skiing

World Cup career
- Seasons: 1983–1990; 1992–1993
- Indiv. podiums: 1
- Updated on 30 Mar 2015

Franz Wiegele (born 23 November 1965) is an Austrian former ski jumper.
