= Jukka Kalso =

Finnish ski jumper

Personal information
- Full name: Jukka Kalso

Sport
- Sport: Skiing

World Cup career
- Seasons: 1983–1987
- Indiv. podiums: 2
- Updated on 30 Mar 2015

Jukka Kalso (born 13 August 1955) is a Finnish former ski jumper. He made his World Cup debut at the Four Hills Tournament in 1982. He competed between 1982 and 1987, reaching the podium twice: he placed third in Big Thunder in 1986 and second in Garmisch-Partenkirchen in 1987. He also took part in the ski flying World Championships in 1983.

Later he was active as a ski jumping coach. He was the personal coach of the Olympic winner Jani Soininen with Risto Pirttimäki.
