= FIS Nordic World Ski Championships 1987 =

International Nordic skiing competition

- Host city: Oberstdorf
- Country: West Germany
- Events: 13
- Opening: February 12, 1987
- Closing: February 21, 1987

The FIS Nordic World Ski Championships 1987 took place 11–21 February 1987 in Oberstdorf, West Germany. Following the domination of the skating technique at the previous championships, the International Ski Federation (FIS) introduced separate cross-country skiing races in the classical technique and the freestyle technique at these championships. For the only time (besides the 1988 Winter Olympics), the relays consisted of four freestyle legs.

== Men's cross-country ==
=== 15 km classical ===
15 February 1987

Medal	Athlete	Time
Gold	Marco Albarello (ITA)	43:01.8
Silver	Thomas Wassberg (SWE)	43:08.6
Bronze	Mikhail Devyatyarov (URS)	43:09.6

=== 30 km classical ===
12 February 1987

Medal	Athlete	Time
Gold	Thomas Wassberg (SWE)	1:24:30.1
Silver	Aki Karvonen (FIN)	1:26:24.0
Bronze	Christer Majbäck (SWE)	1:26:55.0

=== 50 km freestyle ===
21 February 1987

Medal	Athlete	Time
Gold	Maurilio De Zolt (ITA)	2:11:27.2
Silver	Thomas Wassberg (SWE)	2:11:49.5
Bronze	Torgny Mogren (SWE)	2:12:51.1

=== 4 × 10 km relay ===
17 February 1987

Medal	Team	Time
Gold	Sweden (Erik Östlund, Gunde Svan, Thomas Wassberg, Torgny Mogren)	1:38:04.6
Silver	Soviet Union (Oleksandr Batyuk, Vladimir Smirnov, Mikhail Devyatyarov, Vladimir Sakhnov)	1:38:30.9
Bronze	Norway (Ove Aunli, Vegard Ulvang, Pål Gunnar Mikkelsplass, Terje Langli)	1:38:48.2

== Women's cross-country ==
=== 5 km classical ===
16 February 1987

Medal	Athlete	Time
Gold	Marjo Matikainen (FIN)	14:45.7
Silver	Anfisa Reztsova (URS)	14:49.3
Bronze	Evi Kratzer (SUI)	14:52.5

=== 10 km classical ===
13 February 1987

Medal	Athlete	Time
Gold	Anne Jahren (NOR)	31:49.5
Silver	Marjo Matikainen (FIN)	31:50.3
Bronze	Brit Pettersen (NOR)	32:09.2

=== 20 km freestyle ===
20 February 1987

Medal	Athlete	Time
Gold	Marie-Helene Westin (SWE)	57:20.5
Silver	Anfisa Reztsova (URS)	57:47.6
Bronze	Larisa Ptitsyna (URS)	58:28.7

=== 4 × 5 km relay ===
17 February 1987

Medal	Team	Time
Gold	Soviet Union (Antonina Ordina, Nina Gavrylyuk, Larisa Ptitsyna, Anfisa Reztsova)	58:08.8
Silver	Norway (Marianne Dahlmo, Nina Skeime, Anne Jahren, Anette Bøe)	58:46.1
Bronze	Sweden (Magdalena Wallin, Karin Lamberg-Skog, Annika Dahlman, Marie-Helene Westin)	59:41.0

== Men's Nordic combined ==
=== 15 km individual Gundersen ===
13 February 1987

Medal	Athlete	Points
Gold	Torbjørn Løkken (NOR)	423.80
Silver	Trond-Arne Bredesen (NOR)	422.48
Bronze	Hermann Weinbuch (FRG)	421.44

Kerry Lynch of the United States finished second in this event, but was later disqualified for doping. Bredesen would be awarded a silver medal and Weinbuch a bronze as a result.

=== 3 × 10 km team ===
19 February 1987

Medal	Team	Points
Gold	West Germany (Hermann Weinbuch, Hans-Peter Pohl, Thomas Müller)	1262.94
Silver	Norway (Hallstein Bøgseth, Trond-Arne Bredesen, Torbjørn Løkken)	1244.98
Bronze	Soviet Union (Sergey Chervyakov, Andrey Dundukov, Allar Levandi)	1236.70

== Men's ski jumping ==
=== Individual normal hill ===
20 February 1987

Medal	Athlete	Points
Gold	Jiří Parma (TCH)	224.4
Silver	Matti Nykänen (FIN)	216.5
Bronze	Vegard Opaas (NOR)	215.8

=== Individual large hill ===
15 February 1987

Medal	Athlete	Points
Gold	Andreas Felder (AUT)	216.0
Silver	Vegard Opaas (NOR)	208.3
Bronze	Ernst Vettori (AUT)	207.0

=== Team large hill ===
17 February 1987

Medal	Team	Points
Gold	Finland (Matti Nykänen, Ari-Pekka Nikkola, Tuomo Ylipulli, Pekka Suorsa)	634.1
Silver	Norway (Ole Christian Eidhammer, Hroar Stjernen, Ole Gunnar Fidjestøl, Vegard Opaas)	598.0
Bronze	Austria (Ernst Vettori, Richard Schallert, Franz Neuländtner, Andreas Felder)	587.5

== Medal table ==
Medal winners by nation.

* Host nation (West Germany)

Rank	Nation	Gold	Silver	Bronze	Total
1	Sweden (SWE)	3	2	3	8
2	Norway (NOR)	2	5	3	10
3	Finland (FIN)	2	3	0	5
4	Italy (ITA)	2	0	0	2
5	Soviet Union (URS)	1	3	3	7
6	Austria (AUT)	1	0	2	3
7	West Germany (FRG)*	1	0	1	2
8	Czechoslovakia (TCH)	1	0	0	1
9	Switzerland (SUI)	0	0	1	1
Totals (9 entries)		13	13	13	39

== Opening Event ==
The opening event was created and organised by Traumfabrik
