= FIS Ski Flying World Championships 1988 =

1988 edition of the FIS Ski-Flying World Championships

The FIS Ski Flying World Ski Championships 1988 took place in Oberstdorf, West Germany for the record-tying third time, matching Planica, Yugoslavia (now Slovenia). Oberstdorf hosted the championships previously in 1973 and 1981.

== Individual ==
Medal	Athlete	Points
Gold	Ole Gunnar Fidjestøl (NOR)	364.0
Silver	Primož Ulaga (YUG)	361.0
Bronze	Matti Nykänen (FIN)	355.5

== Medal table ==
Rank	Nation	Gold	Silver	Bronze	Total
1	Norway (NOR)	1	0	0	1
2	Yugoslavia (YUG)	0	1	0	1
3	Finland (FIN)	0	0	1	1
Totals (3 entries)		1	1	1	3
