= Primož Ulaga =

Yugoslav ski jumper

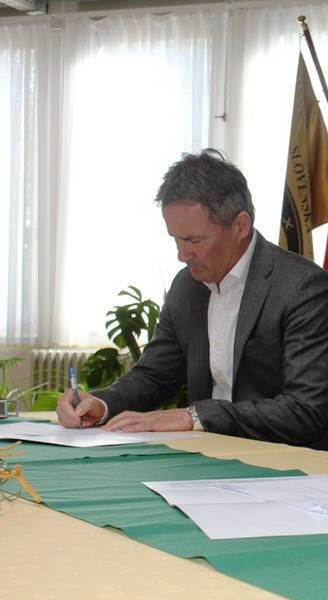

Personal information
- Nationality: Yugoslavia (1979-91); Slovenia (1991-92)
- Born: 20 July 1962 (age 64) Ljubljana, SR Slovenia, Yugoslavia
- Height: 176 cm (5 ft 9 in)

Sport
- Sport: Skiing

World Cup career
- Seasons: 1980–1992
- Indiv. starts: 139*
- Indiv. podiums: 23
- Indiv. wins: 9
Medal record
Men's ski jumping
Olympic Games
| Silver medal – second place | 1988 Calgary | Team LH |
Men's ski flying
FIS Ski Flying World Championships
| Silver medal – second place | 1988 Oberstdorf | Individual |
- Updated on 10 February 2016

Primož Ulaga (born 20 July 1962) is a Yugoslav/Slovenian former ski jumper.

== Career ==
Competing in two Winter Olympics, he won a silver medal in the team large hill competition at Calgary in 1988. Ulaga also won a silver medal at the FIS Ski-Flying World Championships 1988 in Oberstdorf. His best finish at the FIS Nordic World Ski Championships was sixth in the individual large hill event at Seefeld in 1985. He had nine world cup victories between 1981 and 1988.

== World Cup ==
=== Standings ===
| Season | Overall | 4H | SF |
|---|---|---|---|
| 1979/80 | 32 | 70 | N/A |
| 1980/81 | 16 | 27 | N/A |
| 1981/82 | 36 | 34 | N/A |
| 1982/83 | 18 | 29 | N/A |
| 1983/84 | 6 | 26 | N/A |
| 1984/85 | 34 | 42 | N/A |
| 1985/86 | 6 | 31 | N/A |
| 1986/87 | 7 | 8 | N/A |
| 1987/88 | 3rd place, bronze medalist(s) | 31 | N/A |
| 1988/89 | 41 | 33 | N/A |
| 1989/90 | 12 | 13 | N/A |
| 1990/91 | 44 | 24 | — |
| 1991/92 | — | 53 | — |

=== Wins ===
| No. | Season | Date | Location | Hill | Size |
|---|---|---|---|---|---|
| 1 | 1980/81 | 21 February 1981 | (Canada) Thunder Bay | Big Thunder K89 | NH |
| 2 | 1982/83 | 27 March 1983 | (Socialist Federal Republic of Yugoslavia) Planica | Bloudkova velikanka K120 | LH |
| 3 | 1983/84 | 17 December 1983 | (United States) Lake Placid | MacKenzie Intervale K86 | NH |
| 4 | 1985/86 | 7 December 1985 | (Canada) Thunder Bay | Big Thunder K89 | NH |
| 5 | 1985/86 | 8 December 1985 | (Canada) Thunder Bay | Big Thunder K120 | LH |
| 6 | 1986/87 | 4 January 1987 | (Austria) Innsbruck | Bergiselschanze K109 | LH |
| 7 | 1986/87 | 25 January 1987 | (Japan) Sapporo | Ōkurayama K115 | LH |
| 8 | 1987/88 | 26 March 1988 | (Socialist Federal Republic of Yugoslavia) Planica | Srednja Bloudkova K90 | NH |
| 9 | 1987/88 | 27 March 1988 | (Socialist Federal Republic of Yugoslavia) Planica | Bloudkova velikanka K120 | LH |
