= Sergey Chervyakov =

Medal record

Men's Nordic combined

World Championships
Bronze medal – third place	1987 Oberstdorf	3 x 10 km team

Sergey Vasilevich Chervyakov (Russian: Серге́й Васиӆьевич Червяко́в) (born 12 January 1959 in Moscow) is a Soviet Nordic combined skier who competed from 1982 to 1987. He won a bronze medal in the 3x10 km team event at the 1987 FIS Nordic World Ski Championships in Oberstdorf and finished tenth in the 15 km individual at Seefeld in 1985.

Chervyakov finished 12th in the individual event at the 1984 Winter Olympics in Sarajevo. His best individual finish was fourth in East Germany in 1986.
