= Rolf Åge Berg =

Norwegian ski jumper

Personal information
- Nationality: Norwegian
- Born: 14 April 1957 (age 69) Stjørdal Municipality, Norway
- Height: 1.80 m (5 ft 11 in)

Sport
- Sport: Skiing

World Cup career
- Seasons: 1984–1986
- Indiv. starts: 28
- Indiv. podiums: 3
- Indiv. wins: 1
- Updated on 10 February 2016

Rolf Åge Berg (born 14 April 1957) is a Norwegian former ski jumper.

== Career ==
He finished fifth in the individual normal hill event at the 1984 Winter Olympics in Sarajevo. Berg's lone career victory was in an individual normal hill event in St. Moritz in 1986. His career ended after a horrific fall at the Ski Flying World Championships at Kulm in 1986.

== World Cup ==
=== Standings ===
Season	Overall	4H
1983/84	24	11
1984/85	17	8
1985/86	8	37

=== Wins ===
No.	Season	Date	Location	Hill	Size
1	1985/86	19 February 1986	(Switzerland) St. Moritz	Olympiaschanze K94	NH
