= Pavel Kustov =

Soviet ski jumper (born 1965)

Personal information
- Full name: Pavel Kustov
- Height: 1.74 m (5 ft 9 in)

Sport
- Sport: Skiing

World Cup career
- Seasons: 1989–1991
- Indiv. podiums: 1
- Updated on 30 Mar 2015

Pavel Kustov (born 1965) is a Soviet former ski jumper.
