= Big Thunder Ski Jumping Center =

Architectural structure

Coordinates: 48°17′15″N 89°23′00″W

Big Thunder Ski Jumping Centre
- Big Thunder
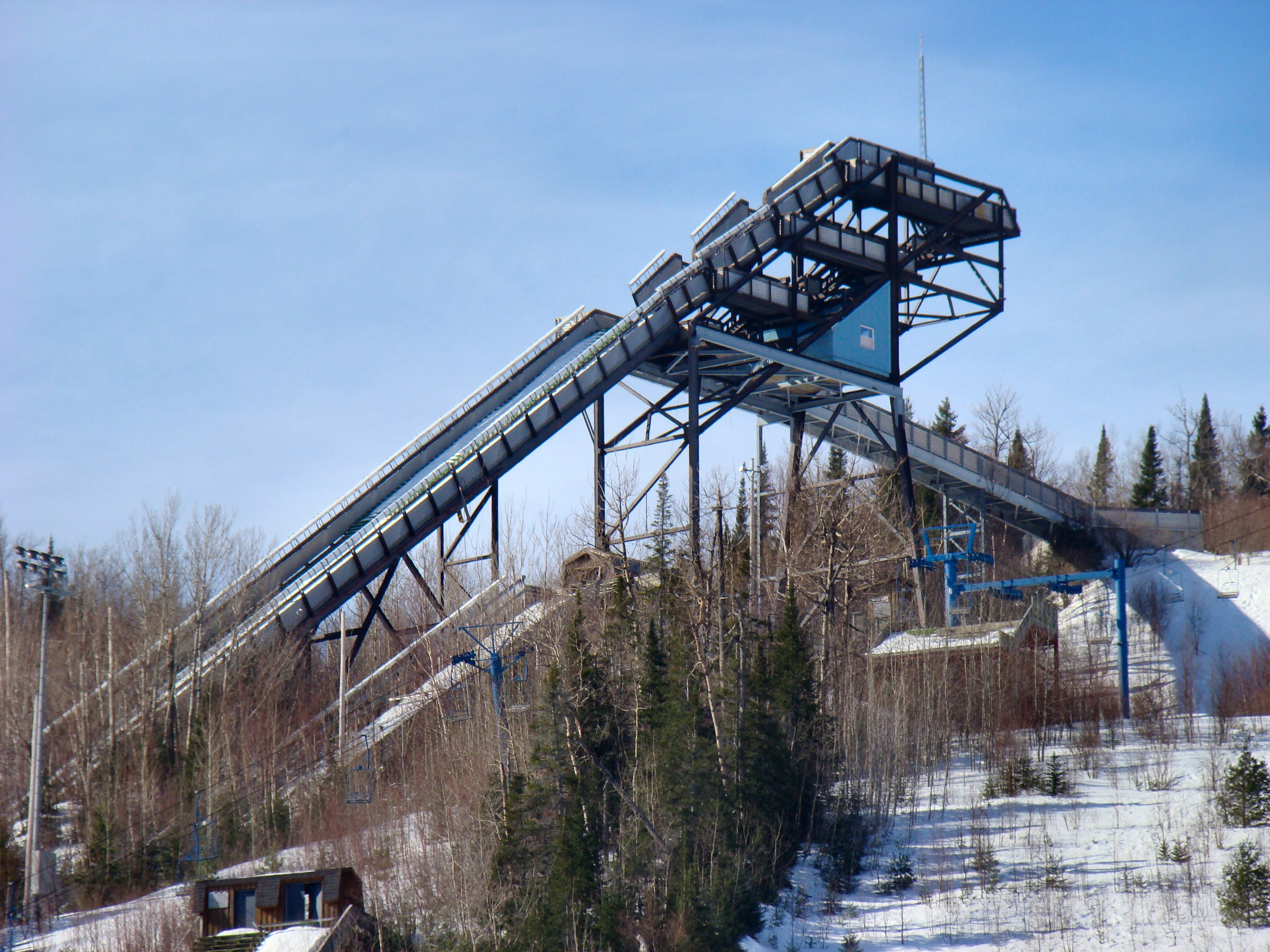
- Location: Northwestern Ontario; Thunder Bay; Canada
- Opened: 1963
- Closed: 1996

Size
- K–point: K-120; K-90
- Hill record: Tommy Ingebrigtsen (137.0 m (449 ft)); Takanobu Okabe (108.0 m (354 ft))

Top events
- World Championships: 1995

Big Thunder Ski Jumping Centre was a twin ski jumping hill located in Thunder Bay in Northwestern Ontario, Canada. It constitutes part of Big Thunder National Training Centre. The first hills were built by Knute and Thor Hansen and opened in 1963. They were originally known as Lille Norway Ski Area, then Mt. Norway Ski Area, and Sundance Northwest Resort before taking the current name. The large and normal hills were built in 1974 and the venue was taken over by the provincial government in 1985. The hills hosted 29 FIS Ski Jumping World Cup and 50 Canadian Ski Jumping Championships tournaments between 1975 and 1995, climaxing with the FIS Nordic World Ski Championships 1995. Funding was then cut and the venue has since been closed and unmaintained.

== History ==
The location was first identified by Knute Hansen, a ski jumper who felt that a location on Mount McRae in Lakehead would be ideal for a ski jumping hill. He and Thor Hansen built the first jumps, which were opened in 1963 and named Lille Norway Ski Area. In 1969, after the Hansens had fallen into financial difficulties, the venue was sold and renamed Mt. Norway Ski Area. Additional land for the complex was also leased, and the provincial government provided funding to construct the main twin hill. Construction of the 70 meter and 90 meter (current K-90 and K-120) hills was completed in 1974. The following year, the venue hosted its first Canadian Ski Jumping Championships. Three years later, the venue was again sold, this time being named Sundance Northwest Resort. In 1981, the Provincial Government of Ontario started redeveloping the site to transform it into a national training center. In 1985, the Ontario Ministry of Tourism and Recreation bought the site. In the course of five years, they built a K-64 hill, as well as Little Thunder, which consisted of K-10, K-20 and K-37 hills. The two largest of these were equipped with porcelain in-runs and plastic landing slopes, allowing for their use during summer.

In 1990, the venue was awarded the hosting of the 1995 Nordic World Ski Championships. This required a major upgrade to the infrastructure, including floodlights. World Cup tournaments were placed on hold after 1991 for the upgrades. The venue hosted the Pre-World Championships, part of the World Cup, in 1994. In the final jumping event in the 1995 World Championships, Tommy Ingebrigtsen set a hill record of 137.0 meters (449 ft), 9 meters (30 ft) beyond the previous hill record.

During the campaigning for the 1995 Ontario provincial election, Conservative Party leader Mike Harris deemed Big Thunder a "cash cow" as part of his Common Sense Revolution. Following the party's victory in the election, the venue was closed. Even though the venue closed, it still costs the province several hundred thousand dollars per year. The citizens group Friends of Big Thunder Bay announced on 1 March 2010, following the 2010 Winter Olympics in Vancouver, that they had sent a letter of intent to the provincial government where they stated that they wished to re-open the sports park. They intend to not only reopen the hill, but also the associated sports area and provide year-round training of ski jumping, freestyle skiing, cross-country skiing, mountain biking, event hosting and hiking. Ski Jumping Canada has asked the province to establish a training facility for ski jumping in Ontario, stating that lack of facilities make it difficult for Canada to produce ski jumpers for the world scene, and that this among other things will result in poor performances in the Olympics.

== Events ==
Big Thunder was a regular site for the FIS Nordic Ski Jumping World Cup, and arranged a world cup round, typically with two jumps, every season from 1980 through 1991. Nordic combined was, in addition to the World Championships, hosted twice, in 1989 and in 1994. The last World Cup tournament was held in 1994 as a Pre-World Championship tournament.

Contested between 9 and 19 March 1995, the FIS Nordic World Ski Championships is the hallmark of the venue, and the only major world championship to be contested in Northern Ontario. The Nordic combined individual took place on 9 March, and was won by Fred Børre Lundberg ahead of Jari Mantila. The following day saw Japan win ahead of Norway and Finland in the Nordic combined team event. In ski jumping, the individual normal hill event took place on 12 March, which saw a double Japanese victory with Takanobu Okabe winning ahead of Hiroya Saito. The team event in the large hill on 16 March saw Finland win ahead of Germany and Japan. In the large hill individual event on 18 March, Tommy Ingebrigtsen set a new hill record and won ahead of Andreas Goldberger.

== Results ==
The following is a list of all FIS Ski Jumping World Cup and FIS Nordic World Ski Championship tournaments held at Big Thunder, with the date, hill and top three finishing athletes or teams.

Date	Hill	Gold	Silver	Bronze	Ref
19 January 1980	K-120	(Austria) Armin Kogler	(France) Bernard Moullier	(Austria) Alfred Groyer	
20 January 1980	K-120	(Austria) Armin Kogler	(Austria) Hubert Neuper	(Austria) Toni Innauer	
21 February 1981	K-90	(Socialist Federal Republic of Yugoslavia) Primož Ulaga	(Norway) Johan Sætre	(Canada) Steve Collins	
22 February 1981	K-120	(United States) John Broman	(Norway) Ivar Mobekk	(Austria) Andreas Felder	
23 January 1982	K-90	(Canada) Horst Bulau	(Italy) Massimo Rigoni	(Austria) Ernst Vettori	
24 January 1982	K-120	(Canada) Horst Bulau	(Italy) Massimo Rigoni	(Austria) Hubert Neuper	
22 January 1983	K-90	(Canada) Horst Bulau	(Norway) Olav Hansson	(Finland) Pentti Kokkonen	
23 January 1983	K-120	(Finland) Matti Nykänen	(Canada) Horst Bulau	(Norway) Olav Hansson	
10 December 1983	K-90	(Canada) Horst Bulau	(Finland) Matti Nykänen	(Norway) Vegard Opaas	
11 December 1983	K-120	(Norway) Vegard Opaas	(Finland) Matti Nykänen	(Canada) Horst Bulau	
8 December 1984	K-90	(Austria) Andreas Felder	(Finland) Pentti Kokkonen	(Austria) Ernst Vettori	
9 December 1984	K-120	(Austria) Andreas Felder	(Finland) Jari Puikkonen	(Austria) Ernst Vettori	
7 December 1985	K-90	(Socialist Federal Republic of Yugoslavia) Primož Ulaga	(Norway) Vegard Opaas	(Finland) Matti Nykänen	
8 December 1985	K-120	(Socialist Federal Republic of Yugoslavia) Primož Ulaga	(Austria) Franz Neuländtner	(Austria) Ernst Vettori	
6 December 1986	K-90	(Germany) Jens Weißflog	(Finland) Matti Nykänen	(Finland) Jukka Kalso	
7 December 1986	K-120	(Finland) Matti Nykänen	(Germany) Thomas Klauser	(Norway) Vegard Opaas	
5 December 1987	K-90	(Finland) Matti Nykänen	(Czech Republic) Pavel Ploc	(Austria) Ernst Vettori	
6 December 1987	K-120	(Finland) Matti Nykänen	(Germany) Thomas Klauser	(Germany) Jens Weißflog	
3 December 1988	K-90	(Germany) Dieter Thoma	(Finland) Risto Laakonen	(Finland) Matti Nykänen	
4 December 1988	K-120	(Finland) Risto Laakonen	(Norway) Erik Johnsen	(Germany) Dieter Thoma	
3 December 1989	K-90	(Germany) Dieter Thoma	(Austria) Heinz Kuttin	(Finland) Ari-Pekka Nikkola	
4 December 1989	K-120	(Finland) Risto Laakonen	(Austria) Andreas Felder	(Austria) Heinz Kuttin	
8 December 1990	K-90	(Austria) Andreas Felder	(Germany) Dieter Thoma	(Socialist Federal Republic of Yugoslavia) Franci Petek	
9 December 1990	K-120	(Austria) Andreas Felder	(Socialist Federal Republic of Yugoslavia) Franci Petek	(Finland) Ari-Pekka Nikkola	
1 December 1991	K-90	(Finland) Toni Nieminen	(Finland) Ari-Pekka Nikkola	(Austria) Stefan Horngacher	
2 December 1991	K-120	(Austria) Ernst Vettori	(United States) Mike Holland	(Switzerland) Stephan Zünd	
25 March 1994	K-120	Germany	Norway	Japan	
26 March 1994	K-90	(Germany) Gerd Siegmund	(Austria) Andreas Goldberger	(Italy) Roberto Cecon	
27 March 1994	K-90	(Germany) Jens Weißflog	(Japan) Takanobu Okabe	(Norway) Espen Bredesen	
12 March 1995	K-90	(Japan) Takanobu Okabe	(Japan) Hiroya Saito	(Finland) Mika Laitinen	
16 March 1995	K-120	Finland	Germany	Japan	
18 March 1995	K-120	(Norway) Tommy Ingebrigtsen	(Austria) Andreas Goldberger	(Germany) Jens Weißflog	
