= Virginio Lunardi =

Italian ski jumper

Personal information
- Full name: Virginio Lunardi
- Born: 23 March 1968 (age 58) Gallio, Italy
- Height: 1.84 m (6 ft 0 in)

Sport
- Sport: Skiing

World Cup career
- Seasons: 1986–1993
- Indiv. podiums: 4
- Updated on 30 Mar 2015

Virginio Lunardi (born 23 March 1968) is an Italian former ski jumper. He competed at the 1988 Winter Olympics.
