= Mattenschanze =

Coordinates: 46.4665°N 7.2782°E

- Location: Gstaad; Switzerland
- Opened: 1916
- Renovated: 1932, 1959, 1966, 1972
- Closed: 1992
- Demolished: 2008

Size
- K–point: K-88
- Hill record: 92 m (302 ft) (Austria) Ernst Vettori (20 February 1981)

Mattenschanze is demolished ex ski jumping normal hill in Gstaad, Switzerland.

== History ==
Hill was opened in 1916 and owned by Ski-Club Gstaad. It was renovated in 1932, 1959, 1966 and 1972. It hosted six FIS Ski jumping World Cup events in from 1980 to 1990. Now it's no longer in use. They closed it in 1992 and demolished in 2008. Ernst Vettori holds the hill record.
