= Tremplin Olympique du Mont =

Jumping venue in Chamonix, France

Coordinates: 45°53′54″N 6°50′31″E

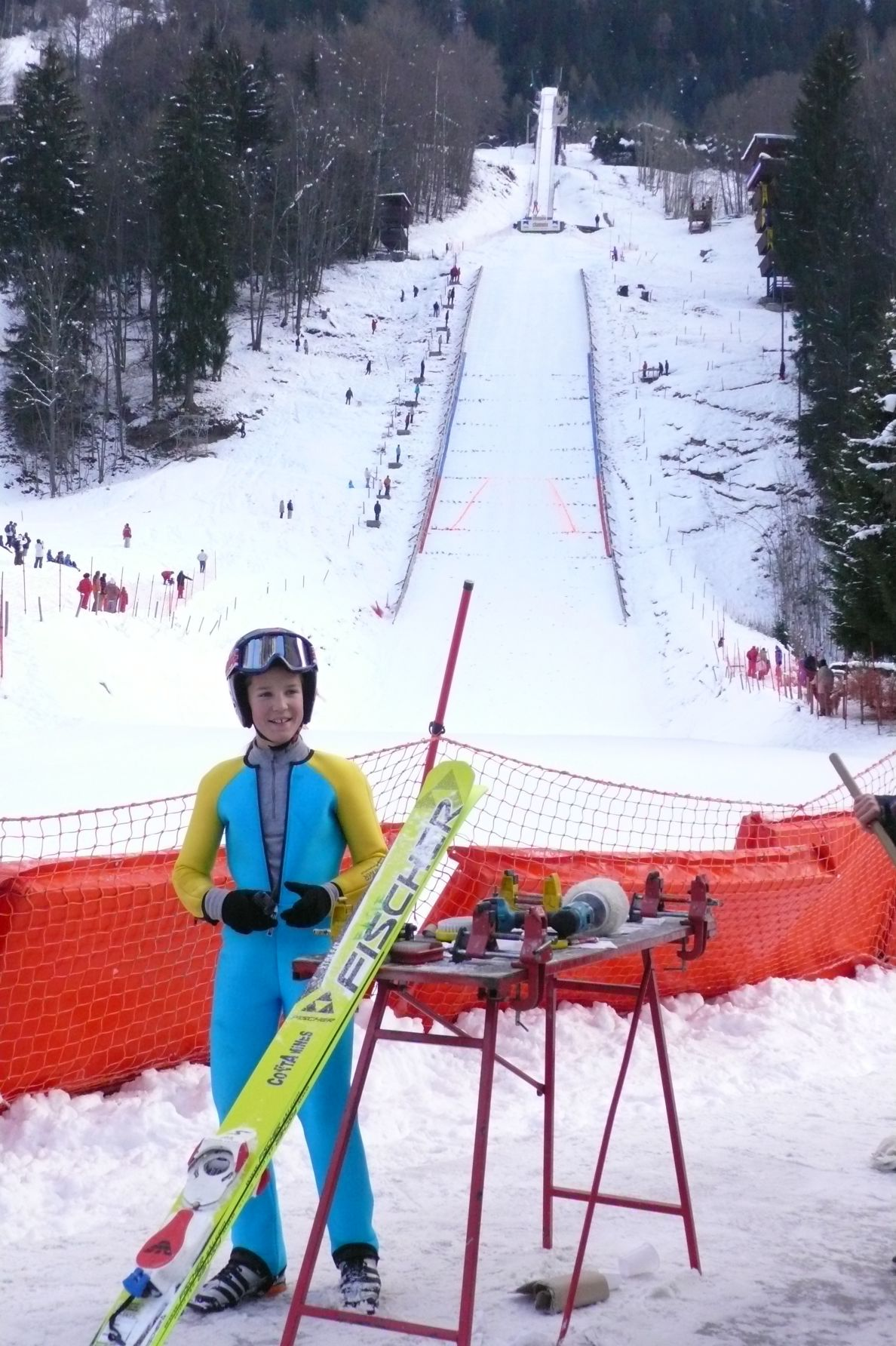
Le Mont

The Tremplin Olympique du Mont (English: Olympic jumping hill of Le Mont) was a ski jumping venue constructed for the 1924 Winter Olympics in Chamonix, France.

== Jump description ==
The jumper started at a height of 1189.8 m, traveling 79.4 meters while dropping in height to a take off point of 1152.8 meters. Upon flight, the K-point was determined to be 71.5 meters.

== 1924 Winter Olympics ==
This venue hosted both the ski jumping and the ski jumping part of the Nordic combined events at the 1924 Winter Olympics.

== After the Olympics ==
The hill served as a venue for the FIS Nordic World Ski Championships 1937. Built in 1905, it was renovated in 1998.
