= Miran Tepeš =

Slovenian ski jumper (born 1961)

Medal record

Men's ski jumping

Representing Yugoslavia

Olympic Games
Silver medal – second place	1988 Calgary	Team large hill

Miran Tepeš (born 25 April 1961) is a Slovenian former ski jumper and current ski jumping official who competed for Yugoslavia and Slovenia from 1979 to 1992. He won a silver medal in the team large hill competition at the 1988 Winter Olympics in Calgary. He finished fourth in the normal hill individual competition, and tenth in the large hill competition.

His best finish in FIS Ski Jumping World Cup competitions was second place (a total of seven times between 1985 and 1990).

After retiring, Tepeš started working as a FIS competition official. His son Jurij Tepeš and daughter Anja Tepeš were also ski jumpers.

Miran Tepeš is also a passionate sailor, who has circumnavigated the world three times with his own sailing boat "Skokica". His first trip around the world was between the years 2006 and 2008, his second trip (including Cape Horn) started in 2010 and was completed in autumn 2012. The third trip (which included Iceland, Greenland, Tasmania, South Africa, and Amazonia) started in 2014 and ended in 2018. In 2023, he sailed through the Northwest Passage through the Arctic from Greenland to Pacific.
