= Miyanomori Ski Jump Stadium =

Ski jumping venue in Sapporo, Japan

Coordinates: 43.039167°N 141.295556°E

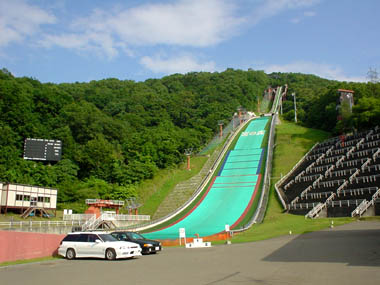
- Location: Miyanomori, Chūō-ku; Sapporo; Japan
- Opened: 1969

Size
- K–point: 90 m
- Hill size: 100 m
- Hill record: 104 m (2012)

Top events
- Olympics: 1972 Winter Olympics
- World Championships: FIS Nordic World Ski Championships 2007

The Miyanomori Ski Jump Stadium (宮の森ジャンプ競技場, Miyanomori Janpu Kyōgijō), also known as the Miyanomori-Schanze, is a ski jumping venue located in the Miyanomori area in Chūō-ku, Sapporo, Hokkaidō, Japan. The stadium has hosted a number of winter sports events including the 1972 Winter Olympics and FIS Nordic World Ski Championships 2007.

== History ==
It was built in 1969 in order to accommodate the Ski jumping (Normal hill) and Nordic combined events of the 1972 Winter Olympics; the ski jumping competition was held along with the Okurayama Ski Jump Stadium. The facility has hosted some events of the FIS Nordic World Ski Championships 2007, in addition to many stages of the World Cup Nordic combined and World Cup ski jump.

== Overview ==
At the time of the Olympics the ski jump had a height of 70 metres; It was refurbished and now has one of 90 metres, which is a normal ski jump (HS 100). The official record of 102.5 m distance, was established by the Polish Adam Małysz when he became world champion in 2007, although an unofficial 106 m was achieved by the German Eric Frenzel in the same year. The female record 100 m, belongs to Norwegian Maren Lundby (15-01-2017).

== Access ==
- JR Bus: from Maruyama Bus Terminal (Maruyama-Kōen Station, Tōzai Line) to Miyanomori Schanze Bus stop, 10 minutes walking distance.
