= Gross-Titlis-Schanze =

Ski jump in Engelberg, Switzerland

Coordinates: 46°48′56″N 8°24′14″E

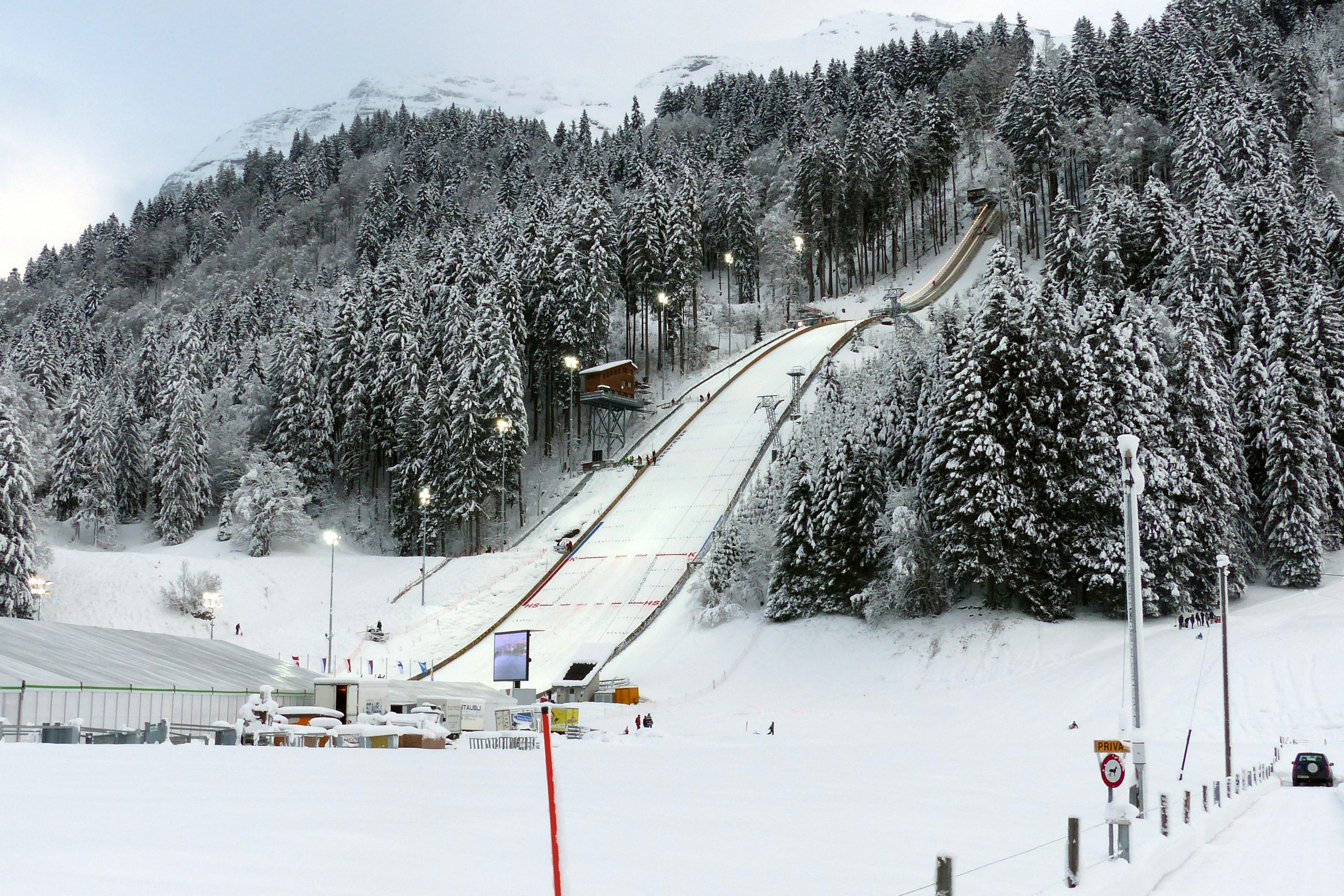
- Location: Engelberg, Switzerland
- Opened: 1971
- Renovated: 1984, 2001, 2016

Size
- K–point: K-125
- Hill size: HS140
- Hill record: 145.0 m (475.8 ft) (Austria) Stephan Embacher (21 December 2025)

Gross-Titlis-Schanze (en: Large Titlis hill) is a large ski jumping hill, located in Engelberg, Switzerland. It is named after the local mountain of Titlis, at an altitude of 1180 m above sea level and is a regular venue in the FIS Ski jumping World Cup. Mostly, the competitions take place in December, just before the Four Hills Tournament.

== Hill parameters ==
- Construction point: 125 m
- Hill size (HS): 140 m
- Official hill record: 145.0 m – (Austria) Stephan Embacher (21 December 2025)
- Hill record: 146.0 m – (Poland) Kamil Stoch (18 December 2020)
- Inrun length: 99.0 m
- Inrun angle: 36°
- Take-off length: 7 m
- Take-off angle: 11°
- Take-off height: 3.15 m
- Landing angle: 34.8°
- Average speed: 95.15 km/h
