= 1983–84 FIS Ski Jumping World Cup =

Ski jumping championship season

1983–84 World Cup
Winners
- Overall: (East Germany) Jens Weißflog
- Four Hills Tournament: (East Germany) Jens Weißflog
- Bohemia Tournament: (East Germany) Jens Weißflog
- K.O.P. Ski Flying Week: (Finland) Matti Nykänen
- Nations Cup: Finland

Competitions
- Venues: 17
- Individual: 24

The 1983–84 FIS Ski Jumping World Cup was the fifth World Cup season in ski jumping.

This season began in Thunder Bay, Canada on 10 December 1983 and was finished in Planica, Yugoslavia on 25 March 1984. The individual World Cup overall winner was East German ski jumper Jens Weißflog and Nations Cup was given to Team of Finland.

24 men's individual events on 15 different venues in 11 countries on three different continents (Europe, Asia and North America) were held. No competition was cancelled this season.

Peaks of the season were Winter Olympics which also counted for World Cup points (only time in history), 4H Tournament, Bohemia Tournament and the K.O.P. International Ski Flying Week.

On 16 and 17 March 1984 in Oberstdorf, finnish legend Matti Nykänen set and improved world record three times in total; two times on 182 metres (597 ft) and 185 metres (607 f).

== World records ==
List of world record distances achieved within this World Cup season.

Date	Athlete	Hill	Round	Place	Metres	Feet
16 March 1984	(Finland) Matti Nykänen	Heini-Klopfer-Skiflugschanze K180	Training R2	Oberstdorf, West Germany	182	597
16 March 1984	(Finland) Matti Nykänen	Heini-Klopfer-Skiflugschanze K180	Training R3	Oberstdorf, West Germany	182	597
17 March 1984	(Finland) Matti Nykänen	Heini-Klopfer-Skiflugschanze K180	Round 2	Oberstdorf, West Germany	185	607

== Map of world cup hosts ==
Europe
West Germany	Austria Asia	North America

== Calendar ==
=== Men's Individual ===
N – normal hill / L – large hill / F – flying hill
All	No.	Date	Place (Hill)	Size	Winner	Second	Third	Overall leader (Note: Yellow bib for the overall leader was introduced later, from the 1988/89 season onwards.)	R.
97	1	10 December 1983	(Canada) Thunder Bay (Big Thunder K89, K120)	N _{033}	(Canada) Horst Bulau	(Finland) Matti Nykänen	(Norway) Vegard Opaas	(Canada) Horst Bulau	
98	2	11 December 1983	(Canada) Thunder Bay (Big Thunder K89, K120)	L _{056}	(Norway) Vegard Opaas	(Finland) Matti Nykänen	(Canada) Horst Bulau	(Canada) Horst Bulau (Finland) Matti Nykänen (Norway) Vegard Opaas	
99	3	17 December 1983	(United States) Lake Placid (MacKenzie Inter. K86, K114)	N _{034}	(Socialist Federal Republic of Yugoslavia) Primož Ulaga	(Finland) Matti Nykänen	(Canada) Horst Bulau (United States) Jeff Hastings	(Finland) Matti Nykänen	
100	4	18 December 1983	(United States) Lake Placid (MacKenzie Inter. K86, K114)	L _{057}	(United States) Jeff Hastings	(Socialist Federal Republic of Yugoslavia) Primož Ulaga	(Czechoslovakia) Jiří Parma	(Finland) Matti Nykänen	
101	5	30 December 1983	(West Germany) Oberstdorf (Schattenbergschanze K115)	L _{058}	(East Germany) Klaus Ostwald	(East Germany) Jens Weißflog	(Norway) Ole G. Fidjestøl	(Finland) Matti Nykänen	
102	6	1 January 1984	(West Germany) Garmisch-Pa (Große Olympiaschanze K107)	L _{059}	(East Germany) Jens Weißflog	(Switzerland) Hansjörg Sumi	(East Germany) Klaus Ostwald	(Finland) Matti Nykänen	
103	7	4 January 1984	(Austria) Innsbruck (Bergiselschanze K106)	L _{060}	(East Germany) Jens Weißflog	(Finland) Matti Nykänen	(Finland) Jari Puikkonen	(Finland) Matti Nykänen	
104	8	6 January 1984	(Austria) Bischofshofen (Paul-Ausserleitner K111)	L _{061}	(East Germany) Jens Weißflog	(Norway) Per Bergerud	(Socialist Federal Republic of Yugoslavia) Primož Ulaga	(Finland) Matti Nykänen	
32nd Four Hills Tournament Overall (30 December 1983 – 6 January 1984)					(East Germany) Jens Weißflog	(East Germany) Klaus Ostwald	(Finland) Matti Nykänen	4H Tournament	
105	9	11 January 1984	(Italy) Cortina d’Ampezzo (Trampolino Olimpico K92)	N _{035}	(East Germany) Jens Weißflog	(Canada) Horst Bulau	(East Germany) Klaus Ostwald	(East Germany) Jens Weißflog	
106	10	14 January 1984	(Czechoslovakia) Harrachov (Čerťák K120)	L _{062}	(Czechoslovakia) Jiří Parma	(East Germany) Jens Weißflog	(Czechoslovakia) Pavel Ploc	(East Germany) Jens Weißflog	
107	11	15 January 1984	(Czechoslovakia) Liberec (Ještěd A K115)	L _{063}	(East Germany) Jens Weißflog	(East Germany) Klaus Ostwald	(Norway) Per Bergerud	(East Germany) Jens Weißflog	
21st Bohemia Tournament Overall (14 – 15 January 1984)					(East Germany) Jens Weißflog	(Czechoslovakia) Jiří Parma	(East Germany) Holger Freitag	Bohemia Tournament	
108	12	21 January 1984	(Japan) Sapporo (Miyanomori K90); Ōkurayama K110)	N _{036}	(Japan) Masahiro Akimoto	(Finland) Veli-Matti Ahonen	(Austria) Manfred Steiner	(East Germany) Jens Weißflog	
109	13	22 January 1984	(Japan) Sapporo (Miyanomori K90); Ōkurayama K110)	L _{064}	(Austria) Manfred Steiner	(Finland) Veli-Matti Ahonen	(Japan) Masahiro Akimoto	(East Germany) Jens Weißflog	
FIS World Cup 1983/84 = 1984 Winter Olympics (12 – 18 February • Sarajevo)
110	14	12 February 1984	(Socialist Federal Republic of Yugoslavia) Sarajevo (Igman K90, K112)	N _{037}	(East Germany) Jens Weißflog	(Finland) Matti Nykänen	(Finland) Jari Puikkonen	(East Germany) Jens Weißflog	
111	15	18 February 1984	(Socialist Federal Republic of Yugoslavia) Sarajevo (Igman K90, K112)	L _{065}	(Finland) Matti Nykänen	(East Germany) Jens Weißflog	(Czechoslovakia) Pavel Ploc	(East Germany) Jens Weißflog	
112	16	2 March 1984	(Finland) Lahti (Salpausselkä K88, K113)	N _{038}	(Finland) Matti Nykänen	(Finland) Jari Puikkonen	(West Germany) Andreas Bauer	(East Germany) Jens Weißflog	
113	17	4 March 1984	(Finland) Lahti (Salpausselkä K88, K113)	L _{066}	(Finland) Matti Nykänen	(Finland) Jari Puikkonen	(Czechoslovakia) Pavel Ploc	(East Germany) Jens Weißflog	
114	18	6 March 1984	(Sweden) Falun (Lugnet K89)	N _{039}	(Czechoslovakia) Jiří Parma	(United States) Jeff Hastings	(Austria) Adolf Hirner	(East Germany) Jens Weißflog	
115	19	9 March 1984	(Norway) Lillehammer (Balbergbakken K120)	L _{067}	(Czechoslovakia) Pavel Ploc	(Finland) Matti Nykänen	(Austria) Ernst Vettori	(East Germany) Jens Weißflog	
116	20	11 March 1984	(Norway) Oslo (Holmenkollbakken K105)	L _{068}	(Czechoslovakia) Vladimír Podzimek	(Czechoslovakia) Pavel Ploc	(Norway) Ole C. Eidhammer	(East Germany) Jens Weißflog	
117	21	17 March 1984	(West Germany) Oberstdorf (Heini-Klopfer K182)	F _{010}	(Finland) Matti Nykänen	(Czechoslovakia) Pavel Ploc	(East Germany) Jens Weißflog	(Finland) Matti Nykänen	
118	22	18 March 1984	(West Germany) Oberstdorf (Heini-Klopfer K182)	F _{011}	(Finland) Matti Nykänen	(East Germany) Jens Weißflog (Czechoslovakia) Pavel Ploc		(Finland) Matti Nykänen	
31st K.O.P. International Ski Flying Week Overall (17 – 18 March 1984)					(Finland) Matti Nykänen	(Czechoslovakia) Pavel Ploc	(East Germany) Jens Weißflog	K.O.P.	
119	23	24 March 1984	(Socialist Federal Republic of Yugoslavia) Planica (Srednja Bloudkova K90) (Bloudkova velikanka K120)	N _{040}	(East Germany) Jens Weißflog	(United States) Mike Holland	(Poland) Janusz Malik	(East Germany) Jens Weißflog	
120	24	25 March 1984	(Socialist Federal Republic of Yugoslavia) Planica (Srednja Bloudkova K90) (Bloudkova velikanka K120)	L _{069}	(Czechoslovakia) Pavel Ploc	(Norway) Vegard Opaas	(Poland) Piotr Fijas	(East Germany) Jens Weißflog	
5th FIS World Cup Overall (10 December 1983 – 25 March 1984)					(East Germany) Jens Weißflog	(Finland) Matti Nykänen	(Czechoslovakia) Pavel Ploc	World Cup Overall	

== Standings ==
=== Overall ===
Rank	after 24 events	Points
1	(East Germany) Jens Weißflog	230
2	(Finland) Matti Nykänen	217
3	(Czechoslovakia) Pavel Ploc	148
4	(United States) Jeff Hastings	123
5	(Czechoslovakia) Jiří Parma	122
6	(Socialist Federal Republic of Yugoslavia) Primož Ulaga	120
7	(East Germany) Klaus Ostwald	119
8	(Canada) Horst Bulau	102
9	(Finland) Jari Puikkonen	101
10	(Norway) Vegard Opaas	96

=== Nations Cup ===
Rank	after 24 events	Points
1	Finland	558
2	East Germany	550
3	Czechoslovakia	480
4	Austria	423
5	Norway	411
6	United States	216
7	Yugoslavia	182
8	Canada	125
9	West Germany	122
10	Poland	75

=== Four Hills Tournament ===
Rank	after 4 events	Points
1	(East Germany) Jens Weißflog	897.9
2	(East Germany) Klaus Ostwald	842.3
3	(Finland) Matti Nykänen	825.9
4	(Finland) Jari Puikkonen	791.9
5	(Norway) Ole Gunnar Fidjestøl	790.5
6	(Norway) Per Bergerud	789.9
7	(Czechoslovakia) Pavel Ploc	785.3
8	(Finland) Pentti Kokkonen	768.2
9	(United States) Jeff Hastings	761.3
10	(Austria) Andreas Felder	755.8

=== Bohemia Tournament ===
Rank	after 3 events	Points
1	(East Germany) Jens Weißflog	409.1
2	(Czechoslovakia) Jiří Parma	381.2
3	(East Germany) Holger Freitag	370.3
↓ . . . . . . uncompleted order . . . . . . ↓
N/A	(Czechoslovakia) Pavel Ploc	362.4
N/A	(East Germany) Klaus Ostwald	362.3
N/A	(Austria) Armin Kogler	352.3
N/A	(West Germany) Georg Waldvogel	322.7

== See also ==
- 1983–84 FIS Europa Cup (2nd level competition)
