= FIS Ski Flying World Championships 2014 =

2014 edition of the FIS Ski-Flying World Championships

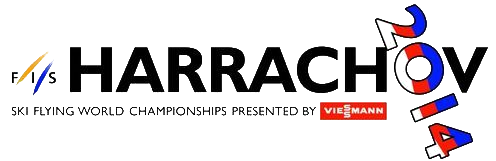
- Official logo for the FIS Ski Flying World Championships 2014.
- Host city: Harrachov, Czech Republic
- Nations: 17
- Athletes: 49
- Events: 2 (1 cancelled)
- Opening: 13 March
- Closing: 16 March
- Main venue: Čerťák
- Website: Harrachov2014.cz

The FIS Ski Flying World Championships 2014 took place from 14 to 16 March 2014 in Harrachov, Czech Republic for the fourth time. Harrachov hosted the event previously in 1983, 1992 and 2002. Individually Robert Kranjec was the defending champion. Austrian teammates Thomas Morgenstern. Andreas Kofler, Gregor Schlierenzauer and Martin Koch were the defending team champions.

The venue as the FIS Ski Flying World Championships 2014 was chosen at the 47th International Ski Congress in Antalya, Turkey on 3 June 2010.

Severin Freund of Germany became the individual champion after two series of jumps, since the last two series were cancelled due to bad weather conditions. Because of the same reason, the team event was cancelled as well.

== Schedule ==
Čerťák-Adidas Arena (K-185; HS205)
Day	Date	Event
Thursday	Mar 13	Qualification
Friday	Mar 14	Individual, Day 1
Saturday	Mar 15	Individual, Day 2
Sunday	Mar 16	Team event

== Results ==
=== Qualifying ===
Rank	Bib	Name	Distance (meters)			Points	Note
Rank	Bib	Name	1st Training	2nd Training	Qualifying	Points	Note
1	6	(Norway) Anders Bardal	142.4	184.0	195.5	186.2	Q
2	5	(Russia) Dimitry Vassiliev	186.5	186.0	193.5	186.2	Q
3	13	(Czech Republic) Roman Koudelka	176.0	184.0	186.0	179.0	Q
4	47	(Poland) Maciej Kot	142.4	183.0	184.0	176.7	Q
5	48	(Austria) Michael Hayböck	176.5	182.0	185.5	171.5	Q
5	18	(Japan) Reruhi Shimizu	166.0	185.5	180.0	171.5	Q
7	35	(Austria) Stefan Kraft	175.5	188.5	179.5	166.5	Q
8	38	(Czech Republic) Jakub Janda	154.5	177.0	179.0	166.1	Q
9	19	(Norway) Bjørn Einar Romøren	166.5	195.0	176.0	165.9	Q
10	49	(Germany) Andreas Wellinger	186.5	182.0	181.5	164.5	Q
11	41	(Slovenia) Jernej Damjan	165.5	187.0	177.0	163.0	Q
12	44	(Norway) Rune Velta	188.0	182.5	178.5	161.7	Q
13	26	(Austria) Thomas Diethart	187.5	192.5	176.5	161.6	Q
14	27	(Finland) Lauri Asikainen	180.0	159.0	178.5	161.0	Q
14	17	(Finland) Anssi Koivuranta	153.0	170.0	174.0	161.0	Q
16	30	(Slovenia) Tomaž Naglič	174.0	184.5	174.0	157.4	Q
17	10	(France) Vincent Descombes Sevoie	176.0	177.0	173.0	156.6	Q
18	36	(Germany) Michael Neumayer	185.5	187.5	173.0	154.1	Q
19	39	(Poland) Jan Ziobro	177.0	189.0	169.5	151.8	Q
20	33	(Switzerland) Gregor Deschwanden	167.0	174.0	169.0	149.9	Q
21	46	(Canada) Mackenzie Boyd-Clowes	182.0	179.0	166.5	145.8	Q
22	14	(Germany) Markus Eisenbichler	170.0	192.0	161.0	144.3	Q
23	31	(Poland) Klemens Murańka	163.5	187.0	165.0	142.9	Q
24	15	(Russia) Denis Kornilov	152.0	180.0	159.0	141.7	Q
25	28	(Italy) Davide Bresadola	129.0	147.0	161.0	140.3	Q
26	34	(Japan) Yuta Watase	117.0	160.0	161.0	140.2	Q
26	7	(Japan) Shōhei Tochimoto	148.5	182.5	160.5	140.2	Q
28	24	(Estonia) Kaarel Nurmsalu	131.5	167.5	155.5	139.4	Q
29	42	(Czech Republic) Antonin Hajek	169.0	181.5	152.5	129.5	Q
30	9	(Italy) Sebastian Colloredo	170.0	168.0	152.0	129.3	Q
not qualified
31	20	(Finland) Ville Larinto	118.5	149.0	140.5	119.0	Q
32	11	(Finland) Sebastian Klinga	156.5	137.0	144.0	117.4	Q
33	3	(United States) Anders Johnson	154.0	133.5	134.5	109.8	Q
34	21	(Italy) Daniele Varesco	104.0	132.5	129.0	103.0	Q
35	16	(Kazakhstan) Radik Zhaparov	114.5	136.5	118.5	86.3	Q
36	2	(Italy) Andrea Morassi	146.5	135.5	118.0	85.2	Q
37	23	(Slovakia) Tomáš Zmoray	101.5	125.5	113.5	83.2	Q
38	22	(United States) Nicholas Fairall	109.5	135.5	106.5	73.2	Q
39	22	(Kazakhstan) Marat Zhaparov	102.0	101.0	106.0	66.2	Q
prequalified
*	50	(Norway) Anders Fannemel	183.5	178.0	181.5		q
*	51	(Slovenia) Robert Kranjec	179.0	161.5	184.0		q
*	52	(Czech Republic) Jan Matura	183.5	187.0	185.0		q
*	53	(Poland) Kamil Stoch	187.0	200.5	200.0		q
*	54	(Slovenia) Jurij Tepeš	181.0	188.0	185.5		q
*	55	(Germany) Severin Freund	188.5	191.0	204.0		q
*	56	(Switzerland) Simon Ammann	189.0	198.5	196.0		q
*	57	(Austria) Gregor Schlierenzauer	179.5	190.5	190.0		q
*	58	(Japan) Noriaki Kasai	DNS	DNS	DNS		q
*	59	(Slovenia) Peter Prevc	191.0	212.5	214.0		q

==== Individual ====
Men's Ski Flying individual at the FIS Ski Flying World Championships 2014
- Venue: Čerťák-Adidas Arena
- Date: 13–14 March 2014
- Competitors: 40 from 14 nations
- Winning score: 391.0

Medalists
gold medal	Severin Freund	Germany
silver medal	Anders Bardal	Norway
bronze medal	Peter Prevc	Slovenia

Rank	Bib	Name	Distance (meters)		Total Points
Rank	Bib	Name	Day Two (Mar 14)		Total Points
Rank	Bib	Name	1st Round	2nd Round	Total Points
1st place, gold medalist(s)	36	(Germany) Severin Freund	203.5	191.5	391.0
2nd place, silver medalist(s)	2	(Norway) Anders Bardal	203.5	188.0	379.9
3rd place, bronze medalist(s)	40	(Slovenia) Peter Prevc	200.0	183.0	375.6
4	39	(Japan) Noriaki Kasai	187.5	193.0	374.6
5	34	(Poland) Kamil Stoch	186.0	190.0	363.8
6	6	(Czech Republic) Roman Koudelka	185.5	197.0	362.6
7	31	(Norway) Anders Fannemel	182.0	187.0	352.5
8	1	(Russia) Dimitry Vassiliev	197.0	175.0	350.2
9	13	(Austria) Thomas Diethart	183.0	184.0	349.0
10	28	(Poland) Maciej Kot	184.5	183.5	347.8
11	20	(Austria) Stefan Kraft	184.0	182.5	343.6
12	10	(Japan) Reruhi Shimizu	185.5	181.5	343.4
13	30	(Germany) Andreas Wellinger	179.0	178.0	337.1
14	33	(Czech Republic) Jan Matura	179.0	175.5	333.2
15	35	(Slovenia) Jurij Tepeš	172.5	174.0	331.4
16	37	(Switzerland) Simon Ammann	172.5	179.5	331.2
17	14	(Finland) Lauri Asikainen	170.5	179.0	329.0
18	11	(Norway) Bjørn Einar Romøren	179.5	171.5	327.7
19	5	(France) Vincent Descombes Sevoie	175.0	173.0	323.4
20	29	(Austria) Michael Hayböck	178.0	171.5	322.5
21	25	(Czech Republic) Antonin Hajek	174.5	167.0	321.3
21	22	(Czech Republic) Jakub Janda	179.5	167.0	321.3
23	18	(Switzerland) Gregor Deschwanden	170.0	173.0	319.3
24	38	(Austria) Gregor Schlierenzauer	169.5	175.5	318.2
25	17	(Poland) Klemens Murańka	174.5	166.5	316.9
26	26	(Norway) Rune Velta	174.0	168.0	315.4
27	23	(Poland) Jan Ziobro	175.5	166.5	312.4
28	9	(Finland) Anssi Koivuranta	170.5	167.5	308.2
29	32	(Slovenia) Robert Kranjec	176.5	161.0	304.7
30	27	(Canada) Mackenzie Boyd-Clowes	175.5	149.0	298.5
not qualified for final round
31	16	(Slovenia) Tomaž Naglič	168.0		
32	3	(Japan) Shōhei Tochimoto	167.5		
33	24	(Slovenia) Jernej Damjan	165.0		
34	21	(Germany) Michael Neumayer	163.5		
35	8	(Russia) Denis Kornilov	162.5		
36	19	(Japan) Yuta Watase	158.0		
37	12	(Estonia) Kaarel Nurmsalu	161.0		
38	7	(Germany) Markus Eisenbichler	160.5		
39	4	(Italy) Sebastian Colloredo	145.5		
40	15	(Italy) Davide Bresadola	139.5		
