= Noriaki Kasai =

Japanese ski jumper (born 1972)

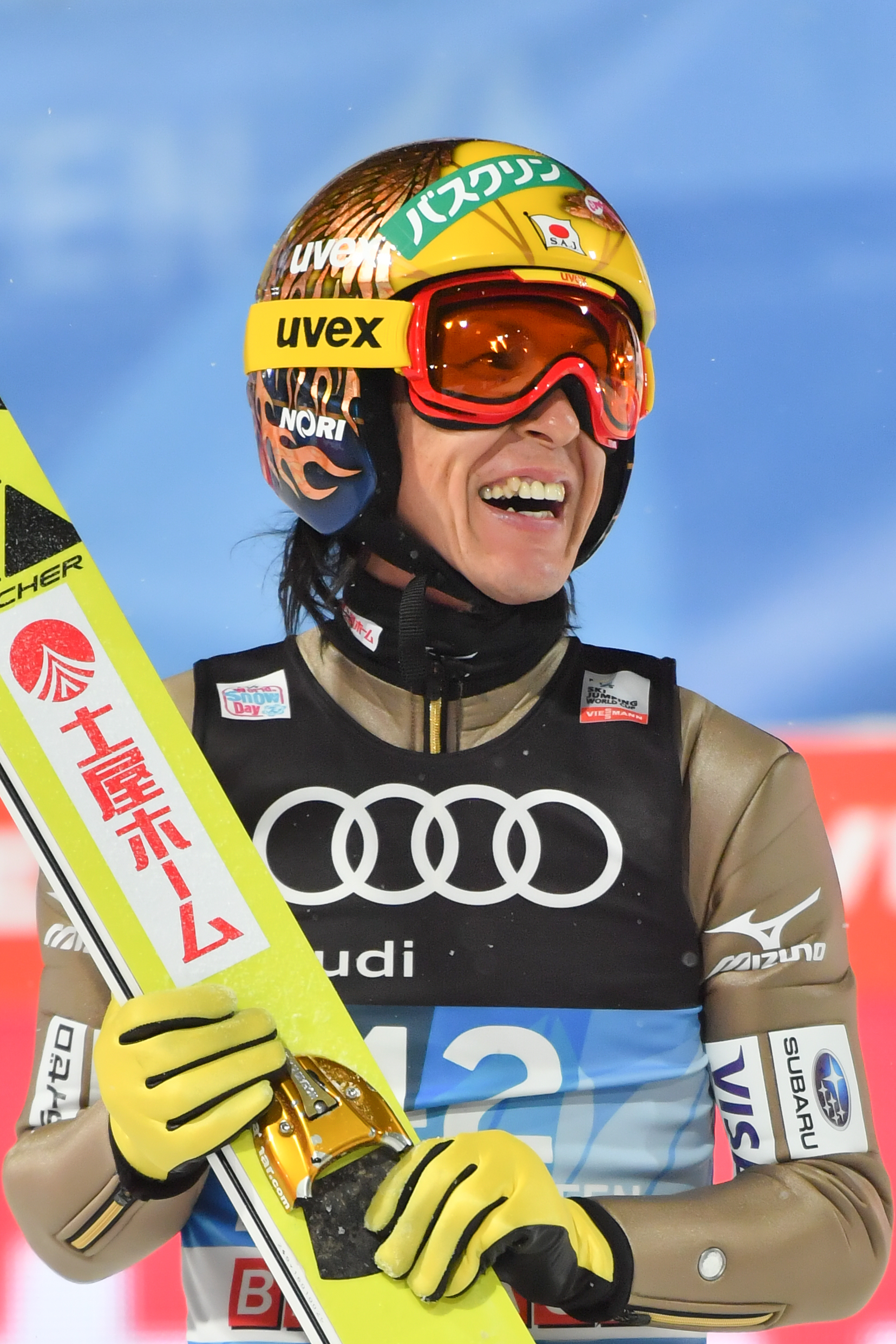
- Kasai in Bischofshofen, 2017

Personal information
- Born: 6 June 1972 (age 54) Shimokawa, Hokkaido, Japan
- Height: 1.76 m (5 ft 9 in)

Sport
- Sport: Ski jumping
- Club: Tsuchiya Home Ski Team

World Cup career
- Seasons: 1988–89 to 1993–94 1995–96 to 2019–20 2022–23 to present
- Indiv. starts: 579
- Indiv. podiums: 63
- Indiv. wins: 17
- Team starts: 73
- Team podiums: 19
- Team wins: 3
- Nordic titles: 1 (1999)

Achievements and titles
- Personal bests: 241.5 m (792 ft); Vikersund, 19 March 2017
Medal record
Event	1st	2nd	3rd
Olympic Games	0	2	1
Ski Jumping World Championships	0	2	5
Ski Flying World Championships	1	0	0
Total	1	4	6
Representing Japan
Men's ski jumping
Olympic Games
Silver medal – second place	1994 Lillehammer	Team LH
Silver medal – second place	2014 Sochi	Individual LH
Bronze medal – third place	2014 Sochi	Team LH
World Championships
Silver medal – second place	1999 Ramsau	Team LH
Silver medal – second place	2003 Val di Fiemme	Team LH
Bronze medal – third place	2003 Val di Fiemme	Individual NH
Bronze medal – third place	2003 Val di Fiemme	Individual LH
Bronze medal – third place	2007 Sapporo	Team LH
Bronze medal – third place	2009 Liberec	Team LH
Bronze medal – third place	2015 Falun	Mixed team NH
Men's ski flying
World Championships
Gold medal – first place	1992 Harrachov	Individual
- Updated on 29 March 2026

Noriaki Kasai (葛西 紀明, Kasai Noriaki; born 6 June 1972) is a Japanese ski jumper. His career achievements include a gold medal at the 1992 Ski Flying World Championships, winning the 1999 Nordic Tournament, individual silver medal at the 2014 Winter Olympics, and two individual bronze medals at the 2003 Ski Jumping World Championships.

During his career, Kasai has broken numerous ski jumping records. In 2016, he was honoured with two Guinness World Records certificates for the most individual World Cup starts, not only in ski jumping, but in all World Cup disciplines organized by the International Ski Federation. At World Cup level, Kasai competed for a total of 35 seasons between 1988–89 and 2025–26.

== Career ==
=== 1988: World Cup debut ===
Kasai made his World Cup debut on 17 December 1988 in Sapporo, Japan, at the age of 16, reaching 31st place. A year later he performed in his first Nordic World Championships in Lahti, Finland.

=== 1992: World champion ===
He won his first and to date only major championship at the FIS Ski Flying World Championships 1992 in Harrachov, Czechoslovakia. He won after a second day of competition which was cancelled after strong winds and a crash of Christof Duffner. At that time he was among the world's top jumpers, known for his extraordinary style, holding his body almost flat between his skis.

=== 1994: Olympic team medal ===
In 1994, he was a member of the Japanese national team that won a silver medal in the team large hill and finished fifth in the individual large hill at the Winter Olympics in Lillehammer. After breaking his shoulder he missed the entire 1994–95 season.

=== 1999: Nordic Tournament ===
In 1999, Kasai won the ski jumping competition at the Holmenkollen Ski Festival and Nordic Tournament overall title. He collected a total of seven medals at the Nordic World Championships, including two silver (team large hill in 1999 and 2003) and five bronze medals (individual normal hill and individual large hill in 2003, team large hill in 2007 and 2009, and mixed team normal hill in 2015). At the 2010 Winter Olympics in Vancouver, he finished eighth on the large hill and 17th on the normal hill.

=== 2014: Oldest Olympic medalist ===
At the 2014 Winter Olympics in Sochi he competed in a record seventh Olympics and took the silver medal in the large hill individual and the bronze in team large hill, becoming the oldest ski jumper ever to take a medal at the winter Olympics.

On 29 November 2014, Kasai became the oldest World Cup winner when he shared the victory with Simon Ammann in Ruka, Finland.

On 22 February 2015, Kasai won the bronze medal at the FIS Nordic World Ski Championships 2015 in mixed team event and became the oldest medalist at the Nordic World Ski Championships. He performed for a record twelfth time in the competition.

=== 2016: 500th World Cup start ===
On 4 March 2016, Kasai was on a World Cup podium in Wisła at the age of 43 years and 272 days, which is a record for the oldest contestant to mount the podium in ski jumping history. On 17 March 2016, he made his 500th individual start in the World Cup.

=== 2018 Olympics ===
Kasai finished 21st in the normal hill event at the 2018 Winter Olympics.

== Records ==
During his career, Kasai broke numerous ski jumping records and age milestones. He is the oldest athlete to ever perform in the FIS Ski Jumping World Cup and holds the record for the most appearances in the competition, with a total of 579 individual starts in 35 seasons between 1988–89 and 2025–26. Kasai also holds a record number of appearances in ski jumping at the Winter Olympics (21 starts), FIS Nordic World Ski Championships (42 starts), and FIS Ski Flying World Championships (13 starts). In 2016, he was awarded with two Guinness World Records certificates for "the most appearances in FIS Nordic World Ski Championships by an individual ski jumper" and "the most individual starts in FIS Ski Jumping World Cup competitions". In November 2014, Kasai became the oldest individual World Cup event winner, aged 42 years and 5 months. He is also the oldest competitor to make a World Cup podium, aged 44 years and 9 months.

Kasai is the first athlete in history to participate at eight Winter Olympics (between 1992 and 2018). At the 2014 Winter Olympics, he became the oldest Olympic medalist in ski jumping after winning a silver medal aged 41 years and 254 days.

== Personal life ==
On 30 January 2016, his wife gave birth to their daughter, Rino.

== Major tournament results ==
=== Olympics ===
Year	Place	NH	LH	Team LH
1992	(France) Albertville	31	26	4
1994	(Norway) Lillehammer	5	14	2nd place, silver medalist(s)
1998	(Japan) Nagano	7	—	—
2002	(United States) Salt Lake City	49	41	—
2006	(Italy) Turin	20	12	6
2010	(Canada) Vancouver	17	8	5
2014	(Russia) Sochi	8	2nd place, silver medalist(s)	3rd place, bronze medalist(s)
2018	(South Korea) Pyeongchang	21	33	6

=== FIS World Nordic Ski Championships ===
Year	Place	NH	LH	Team NH	Team LH	Mixed NH
1989	(Finland) Lahti	54	57	N/A	15	N/A
1991	(Italy) Val di Fiemme	—	36	N/A	11	N/A
1993	(Sweden) Falun	10	7	N/A	5	N/A
1995	(Canada) Thunder Bay	did not qualify				
1997	(Norway) Trondheim	did not qualify				
1999	(Austria) Ramsau	5	10	N/A	2nd place, silver medalist(s)	N/A
2001	(Finland) Lahti	8	19	4	4	N/A
2003	(Italy) Val di Fiemme	3rd place, bronze medalist(s)	3rd place, bronze medalist(s)	N/A	2nd place, silver medalist(s)	N/A
2005	(Germany) Oberstdorf	21	36	9	10	N/A
2007	(Japan) Sapporo	34	24	N/A	3rd place, bronze medalist(s)	N/A
2009	(Czech Republic) Liberec	30	32	N/A	3rd place, bronze medalist(s)	N/A
2011	(Norway) Oslo	26	24	5	6	N/A
2013	(Italy) Val di Fiemme	35	22	N/A	5	—
2015	(Sweden) Falun	35	11	N/A	4	3rd place, bronze medalist(s)
2017	(Finland) Lahti	28	32	N/A	7	—

=== Ski Flying World Championships ===
Year	Place	Individual	Team
1990	(Norway) Vikersund	23	N/A
1992	(Czechoslovakia) Harrachov	1st place, gold medalist(s)	N/A
1994	(Slovenia) Planica	19	N/A
1996	(Austria) Bad Mitterndorf	24	N/A
1998	(Germany) Oberstdorf	—	N/A
2000	(Norway) Vikersund	5	N/A
2002	(Czech Republic) Harrachov	—	N/A
2004	(Slovenia) Planica	24	5
2006	(Austria) Bad Mitterndorf	—	—
2008	(Germany) Oberstdorf	35	7
2010	(Slovenia) Planica	12	—
2012	(Norway) Vikersund	—	—
2014	(Czech Republic) Harrachov	4	—
2016	(Austria) Bad Mitterndorf	5	—
2018	(Germany) Oberstdorf	25	—

== World Cup results ==
=== Standings ===
Season	Overall	4H	SF	RA	NT	JP
1988–89	—	—	N/A	N/A	N/A	N/A
1989–90	24	19	N/A	N/A	N/A	N/A
1990–91	—	73	—	N/A	N/A	N/A
1991–92	9	—	7	N/A	N/A	N/A
1992–93	3rd place, bronze medalist(s)	2nd place, silver medalist(s)	—	N/A	N/A	N/A
1993–94	6	4	19	N/A	N/A	N/A
1995–96	36	10	26	N/A	N/A	36
1996–97	17	24	23	N/A	11	15
1997–98	10	24	13	N/A	4	10
1998–99	3rd place, bronze medalist(s)	2nd place, silver medalist(s)	2nd place, silver medalist(s)	N/A	1st place, gold medalist(s)	4
1999–00	15	20	10	N/A	9	14
2000–01	4	12	8	N/A	23	N/A
2001–02	23	31	N/A	N/A	28	N/A
2002–03	13	23	N/A	N/A	6	N/A
2003–04	8	8	N/A	N/A	10	N/A
2004–05	16	11	N/A	N/A	26	N/A
2005–06	21	9	N/A	N/A	15	N/A
2006–07	26	34	N/A	N/A	20	N/A
2007–08	34	34	N/A	N/A	31	N/A
2008–09	15	13	20	N/A	13	N/A
2009–10	17	11	—	N/A	8	N/A
2010–11	25	31	31	N/A	N/A	N/A
2011–12	51	33	45	N/A	N/A	N/A
2012–13	24	42	17	N/A	N/A	N/A
2013–14	5	5	2nd place, silver medalist(s)	N/A	N/A	N/A
2014–15	6	4	4	N/A	N/A	N/A
2015–16	8	7	5	N/A	N/A	N/A
2016–17	15	29	4	8	N/A	N/A
2017–18	26	40	9	24	N/A	N/A
2018–19	37	42	26	42	N/A	N/A
2019–20	—	—	—	—	N/A	N/A
2022–23	—	—	—	—	N/A	N/A
2023–24	58	—	38	45	N/A	N/A
2024–25	—	—	—	—	N/A	N/A
2025–26	—	—	—	N/A	N/A	N/A

=== Individual wins ===
No.	Season	Date	Location	Hill	Size
1	1991–92	22 March 1992	(Czechoslovakia) Harrachov (SF-WCS)	Čerťák K180	FH
2	1992–93	1 January 1993	(Germany) Garmisch-Partenkirchen	Große Olympiaschanze K107	LH
3	1992–93	23 January 1993	(Italy) Predazzo	Trampolino dal Ben K120	LH
4	1992–93	6 March 1993	(Finland) Lahti	Salpausselkä K90	NH
5	1993–94	9 January 1994	(Austria) Murau	Hans-Walland Großschanze K120	LH
6	1997–98	22 March 1998	(Slovenia) Planica	Bloudkova velikanka K120	LH
7	1998–99	3 January 1999	(Austria) Innsbruck	Bergiselschanze K120	LH
8	1998–99	29 January 1999	(Germany) Willingen	Mühlenkopfschanze K120	LH
9	1998–99	31 January 1999	(Germany) Willingen	Mühlenkopfschanze K120	LH
10	1998–99	9 March 1999	(Norway) Trondheim	Granåsen K120	LH
11	1998–99	14 March 1999	(Norway) Oslo	Holmenkollbakken K115	LH
12	1998–99	21 March 1999	(Slovenia) Planica	Velikanka bratov Gorišek K185	FH
13	2000–01	1 January 2001	(Germany) Garmisch-Partenkirchen	Große Olympiaschanze K115	LH
14	2002–03	9 February 2003	(Germany) Willingen	Mühlenkopfschanze K120	LH
15	2003–04	28 February 2004	(United States) Park City	Utah Olympic Park K120	LH
16	2013–14	11 January 2014	(Austria) Tauplitz/Bad Mitterndorf	Kulm HS200	FH
17	2014–15	29 November 2014	(Finland) Kuusamo	Rukatunturi HS142	LH

=== Individual starts ===
Kasai was three times on the starting list but did not start, at Bischofshofen in 1997, Garmisch-Partenkirchen in 1998, and Lahti in 2014.

winner (1); second (2); third (3); did not compete (–); failed to qualify (q): did not start (DNS)
Season	1	2	3	4	5	6	7	8	9	10	11	12	13	14	15	16	17	18	19	20	21	22	23	24	25	26	27	28	29	30	31	32	Points
1988–89	Thunder Bay	Thunder Bay	Lake Placid	Lake Placid	Sapporo	Sapporo	Oberstdorf	Garmisch-Partenkirchen	Innsbruck	Bischofshofen	Liberec	Harrachov	Oberhof	Oberhof	Chamonix	Oslo	Örnsköldsvik	Harrachov	Planica	Planica													0
1988–89	–	–	–	–	31	26	–	–	–	–	–	–	–	–	–	–	–	–	–	–													0
1989–90	Thunder Bay	Thunder Bay	Lake Placid	Lake Placid	Sapporo	Sapporo	Oberstdorf	Garmisch-Partenkirchen	Innsbruck	Bischofshofen	Harrachov	Liberec	Zakopane	St.Moritz	Gstaad	Engelberg	Predazzo	Predazzo	Lahti	Lahti	Örnsköldsvik	Solleftea	Raufoss	Planica	Planica								43
1989–90	27	18	9	7	20	40	26	15	16	30	–	–	–	18	26	51	7	24	7	10	14	28	50	22	68								43
1990–91	Lake Placid	Lake Placid	Thunder Bay	Thunder Bay	Sapporo	Sapporo	Oberstdorf	Garmisch-Partenkirchen	Innsbruck	Bischofshofen	Oberhof	Tauplitz	Tauplitz	Lahti	Lahti	Bollnaes	Falun	Trondheim	Oslo	Planica	Planica	Strbske Pleso											0
1990–91	47	39	53	51	61	36	47	57	q	q	18	–	–	–	–	–	–	–	–	–	–	–											0
1991–92	Thunder Bay	Thunder Bay	Sapporo	Sapporo	Oberstdorf	Garmisch-Partenkirchen	Innsbruck	Bischofshofen	Predazzo	St.Moritz	Engelberg	Oberstdorf	Oberstdorf	Lahti	Lahti	Örnsköldsvik	Trondheim	Trondheim	Oslo	Harrachov	Planica												115
1991–92	11	13	11	6	–	–	–	–	–	–	–	–	–	3	6	2	6	60	13	1	7												115
1992–93	Falun	Falun	Ruhpolding	Sapporo	Sapporo	Oberstdorf	Garmisch-Partenkirchen	Innsbruck	Bischofshofen	Predazzo	Tauplitz	Tauplitz	Lahti	Lahti	Lillehammer	Oslo	Planica																172
1992–93	34	7	21	14	43	3	1	3	2	1	–	–	1	4	4	4	27																172
1993–94	Planica	Planica	Predazzo	Courchevel	Engelberg	Oberstdorf	Garmisch-Partenkirchen	Innsbruck	Bischofshofen	Murau	Liberec	Liberec	Sapporo	Sapporo	Lahti	Örnsköldsvik	Planica	Thunder Bay	Thunder Bay														562
1993–94	15	5	31	12	27	14	13	3	2	1	–	–	6	5	3	17	19	45	10														562
1995–96	Lillehammer	Lillehammer	Villach	Planica	Predazzo	Chamonix	Chamonix	Oberhof	Oberstdorf	Garmisch-Partenkirchen	Innsbruck	Bischofshofen	Engelberg	Engelberg	Sapporo	Sapporo	Zakopane	Zakopane	Tauplitz	Tauplitz	Iron Mountain	Iron Mountain	Kuopio	Lahti	Lahti	Harrachov	Falun	Oslo					132
1995–96	–	–	–	–	–	–	–	37	14	12	9	17	–	–	52	35	–	–	21	22	17	18	28	q	–	–	–	–					132
1996–97	Lillehammer	Lillehammer	Kuusamo	Kuusamo	Harrachov	Harrachov	Oberstdorf	Garmisch-Partenkirchen	Innsbruck	Bischofshofen	Engelberg	Engelberg	Sapporo	Sapporo	Hakuba	Willingen	Willingen	Tauplitz	Tauplitz	Lahti	Kuopio	Falun	Oslo	Planica	Planica								351
1996–97	15	25	7	23	6	18	31	20	12	DNS	–	–	16	21	2	18	15	33	11	41	27	27	12	20	q								351
1997–98	Lillehammer	Lillehammer	Predazzo	Villach	Harrachov	Engelberg	Engelberg	Oberstdorf	Garmisch-Partenkirchen	Innsbruck	Bischofshofen	Ramsau	Zakopane	Zakopane	Oberstdorf	Oberstdorf	Sapporo	Vikersund	Vikersund	Kuopio	Lahti	Lahti	Falun	Trondheim	Oslo	Planica	Planica						720
1997–98	3	7	7	17	10	4	7	6	DNS	25	30	–	–	–	–	–	37	14	3	5	17	8	16	2	30	4	1						720
1998–99	Lillehammer	Lillehammer	Chamonix	Chamonix	Predazzo	Oberhof	Harrachov	Harrachov	Oberstdorf	Garmisch-Partenkirchen	Innsbruck	Bischofshofen	Engelberg	Engelberg	Zakopane	Zakopane	Sapporo	Sapporo	Willingen	Willingen	Harrachov	Kuopio	Lahti	Trondheim	Falun	Oslo	Planica	Planica	Planica				1,598
1998–99	5	37	5	6	3	12	13	2	3	3	1	4	3	3	5	11	6	12	1	1	–	3	5	1	4	1	4	3	1				1,598
1999–00	Kuopio	Kuopio	Predazzo	Predazzo	Villach	Zakopane	Zakopane	Oberstdorf	Garmisch-Partenkirchen	Innsbruck	Bischofshofen	Engelberg	Engelberg	Sapporo	Sapporo	Hakuba	Willingen	Willingen	Tauplitz	Iron Mountain	Iron Mountain	Lahti	Lahti	Trondheim	Oslo	Planica							436
1999–00	5	13	5	17	16	34	14	47	18	13	17	44	11	8	29	11	31	22	30	–	42	8	18	7	17	5							436
2000–01	Kuopio	Kuopio	Kuopio	Oberstdorf	Garmisch-Partenkirchen	Innsbruck	Bischofshofen	Harrachov	Harrachov	Park City	Hakuba	Sapporo	Sapporo	Willingen	Willingen	Oberstdorf	Oberstdorf	Falun	Trondheim	Oslo	Planica												728
2000–01	48	2	18	2	1	3	44	7	11	18	4	10	4	7	4	18	6	8	44	19	18												728
2001–02	Kuopio	Kuopio	Neustadt	Neustadt	Villach	Engelberg	Engelberg	Predazzo	Predazzo	Oberstdorf	Garmisch-Partenkirchen	Innsbruck	Bischofshofen	Willingen	Zakopane	Zakopane	Hakuba	Sapporo	Lahti	Falun	Trondheim	Oslo											219
2001–02	19	23	25	21	7	25	30	–	–	q	37	28	20	15	–	–	8	3	–	22	25	28											219
2002–03	Kuusamo	Kuusamo	Trondheim	Trondheim	Neustadt	Neustadt	Engelberg	Engelberg	Oberstdorf	Garmisch-Partenkirchen	Innsbruck	Bischofshofen	Liberec	Zakopane	Zakopane	Hakuba	Sapporo	Sapporo	Tauplitz	Tauplitz	Willingen	Willingen	Oslo	Lahti	Lahti	Planica	Planica						548
2002–03	12	22	11	9	19	17	20	17	21	22	13	39	–	–	–	9	10	22	10	10	12	1	5	6	16	36	7						548
2003–04	Kuusamo	Kuusamo	Trondheim	Neustadt	Engelberg	Oberstdorf	Garmisch-Partenkirchen	Innsbruck	Bischofshofen	Liberec	Liberec	Zakopane	Zakopane	Hakuba	Sapporo	Sapporo	Oberstdorf	Willingen	Park City	Lahti	Kuopio	Lillehammer	Oslo										631
2003–04	12	18	21	6	10	5	6	6	11	–	–	–	–	49	8	2	3	15	1	9	11	16	16										631
2004–05	Kuusamo	Kuusamo	Trondheim	Trondheim	Harrachov	Harrachov	Engelberg	Engelberg	Oberstdorf	Garmisch-Partenkirchen	Innsbruck	Bischofshofen	Willingen	Tauplitz	Tauplitz	Neustadt	Neustadt	Zakopane	Zakopane	Sapporo	Sapporo	Pragelato	Lahti	Kuopio	Lillehammer	Oslo	Planica	Planica					416
2004–05	6	6	14	9	11	5	10	25	15	15	20	10	13	34	22	–	–	–	–	9	7	18	25	29	27	31	39	31					416
2005–06	Kuusamo	Kuusamo	Lillehammer	Lillehammer	Harrachov	Harrachov	Engelberg	Oberstdorf	Garmisch-Partenkirchen	Innsbruck	Bischofshofen	Sapporo	Sapporo	Zakopane	Zakopane	Willingen	Lahti	Kuopio	Lillehammer	Oslo	Planica	Planica											249
2005–06	q	41	32	21	38	39	19	13	12	9	11	24	4	–	–	21	19	19	13	14	31	28											249
2006–07	Kuusamo	Lillehammer	Lillehammer	Engelberg	Engelberg	Oberstdorf	Garmisch-Partenkirchen	Innsbruck	Bischofshofen	Vikersund	Zakopane	Oberstdorf	Oberstdorf	Titisee-Neustadt	Titisee-Neustadt	Klingenthal	Willingen	Lahti	Kuopio	Oslo	Oslo	Planica	Planica	Planica									182
2006–07	50	–	–	–	–	q	3	28	42	–	–	–	–	33	15	17	15	19	36	9	12	37	28	24									182
2007–08	Kuusamo	Trondheim	Trondheim	Villach	Villach	Engelberg	Engelberg	Oberstdorf	Garmisch-Partenkirchen	Bischofshofen	Bischofshofen	Predazzo	Predazzo	Harrachov	Zakopane	Zakopane	Sapporo	Sapporo	Liberec	Liberec	Willingen	Kuopio	Kuopio	Lillehammer	Oslo	Planica	Planica						122
2007–08	11	15	17	26	11	–	–	q	25	39	30	q	q	–	–	–	25	42	25	19	34	27	35	35	27	q	32						122
2008–09	Kuusamo	Trondheim	Trondheim	Pragelato	Pragelato	Engelberg	Engelberg	Oberstdorf	Garmisch-Partenkirchen	Innsbruck	Bischofshofen	Tauplitz	Tauplitz	Zakopane	Zakopane	Whistler	Whistler	Sapporo	Willingen	Klingenthal	Oberstdorf	Lahti	Kuopio	Lillehammer	Vikersund	Planica	Planica						409
2008–09	47	33	q	29	6	q	19	17	16	6	19	–	–	–	–	9	12	–	3	21	–	34	5	9	6	28	7						409
2009–10	Kuusamo	Lillehammer	Lillehammer	Engelberg	Engelberg	Engelberg	Oberstdorf	Garmisch-Partenkirchen	Innsbruck	Bischofshofen	Bad Mitterndorf	Bad Mitterndorf	Sapporo	Sapporo	Zakopane	Zakopane	Oberstdorf	Klingenthal	Willingen	Lahti	Kuopio	Lillehammer	Oslo										344
2009–10	10	49	30	13	15	35	13	13	9	19	–	–	6	2	–	–	–	–	–	11	16	9	19										344
2010–11	Kuusamo	Kuopio	Lillehammer	Lillehammer	Engelberg	Engelberg	Engelberg	Oberstdorf	Garmisch-Partenkirchen	Innsbruck	Bischofshofen	Harrachov	Harrachov	Sapporo	Sapporo	Zakopane	Zakopane	Zakopane	Willingen	Klingenthal	Oberstdorf	Vikersund	Vikersund	Lahti	Planica	Planica							197
2010–11	24	16	27	29	35	29	46	22	21	22	–	–	–	11	14	27	25	5	25	DQ	18	25	20	25	q	–							197
2011–12	Kuusamo	Lillehammer	Lillehammer	Harrachov	Harrachov	Engelberg	Engelberg	Oberstdorf	Garmisch-Partenkirchen	Innsbruck	Bischofshofen	Bad Mitterndorf	Bad Mitterndorf	Zakopane	Zakopane	Sapporo	Sapporo	Predazzo	Predazzo	Willingen	Oberstdorf	Lahti	Trondheim	Oslo	Planica	Planica							45
2011–12	–	–	–	–	–	–	–	35	29	36	56	–	–	–	–	15	33	42	q	32	29	24	24	23	28	–							45
2012–13	Lillehammer	Lillehammer	Kuusamo	Krasnaja Polana	Krasnaja Polana	Engelberg	Engelberg	Oberstdorf	Garmisch-Partenkirchen	Innsbruck	Bischofshofen	Wisła	Zakopane	Sapporo	Sapporo	Vikersund	Vikersund	Harrachov	Harrachov	Klingenthal	Oberstdorf	Lahti	Kuopio	Trondheim	Oslo	Planica	Planica						328
2012–13	19	10	7	20	30	25	24	q	41	34	23	–	–	11	19	–	–	–	–	–	–	9	19	12	12	4	4						328
2013–14	Klingenthal	Kuusamo	Lillehammer	Lillehammer	Titisee-Neustadt	Titisee-Neustadt	Engelberg	Engelberg	Oberstdorf	Garmisch-Partenkirchen	Innsbruck	Bischofshofen	Tauplitz	Tauplitz	Wisła	Zakopane	Sapporo	Sapporo	Willingen	Willingen	Falun	Lahti	Lahti	Kuopio	Trondheim	Oslo	Planica	Planica					1,062
2013–14	27	5	10	4	6	3	–	–	6	6	7	5	1	3	–	–	3	6	4	4	3	DNS	9	8	3	4	6	5					1,062
2014–15	Klingenthal	Kuusamo	Kuusamo	Lillehammer	Lillehammer	Nizhny Tagil	Nizhny Tagil	Engelberg	Engelberg	Oberstdorf	Garmisch-Partenkirchen	Innsbruck	Bischofshofen	Tauplitz	Wisła	Zakopane	Sapporo	Sapporo	Willingen	Willingen	Titisee-Neustadt	Titisee-Neustadt	Vikersund	Vikersund	Lahti	Kuopio	Trondheim	Oslo	Oslo	Planica	Planica		1,137
2014–15	6	3	1	11	17	–	–	–	–	8	8	3	2	5	8	9	6	8	9	9	5	11	3	5	5	13	10	4	2	5	8		1,137
2015–16	Klingenthal	Lillehammer	Lillehammer	Nizhny Tagil	Nizhny Tagil	Engelberg	Engelberg	Oberstdorf	Garmisch-Partenkirchen	Innsbruck	Bischofshofen	Willingen	Zakopane	Sapporo	Sapporo	Oslo	Trondheim	Vikersund	Vikersund	Lahti	Lahti	Kuopio	Almaty	Almaty	Wisła	Titisee-Neustadt	Planica	Planica	Planica				909
2015–16	5	30	17	–	–	3	10	5	12	7	9	–	–	4	3	3	3	7	10	7	16	14	10	7	3	12	6	7	4				909
2016–17	Kuusamo	Kuusamo	Klingenthal	Lillehammer	Lillehammer	Engelberg	Engelberg	Oberstdorf	Garmisch-Partenkirchen	Innsbruck	Bischofshofen	Wisła	Wisła	Zakopane	Willingen	Oberstdorf	Oberstdorf	Sapporo	Sapporo	Pyeongchang	Pyeongchang	Oslo	Trondheim	Vikersund	Planica	Planica							401
2016–17	18	24	26	32	33	21	21	31	37	10	14	17	17	23	37	14	12	35	50	21	35	13	15	2	4	3							401
2017–18	Wisła	Kuusamo	Nizhny Tagil	Nizhny Tagil	Titisee-Neustadt	Engelberg	Engelberg	Oberstdorf	Garmisch-Partenkirchen	Innsbruck	Bischofshofen	Tauplitz	Zakopane	Willingen	Willingen	Lahti	Oslo	Lillehammer	Trondheim	Vikersund	Planica	Planica											164
2017–18	31	q	–	–	10	42	48	46	q	18	48	5	24	–	–	q	30	18	46	10	11	22											164
2018–19	Wisła	Kuusamo	Kuusamo	Nizhny Tagil	Nizhny Tagil	Engelberg	Engelberg	Oberstdorf	Garmisch-Partenkirchen	Innsbruck	Bischofshofen	Val di Fiemme	Val di Fiemme	Zakopane	Sapporo	Sapporo	Oberstdorf	Oberstdorf	Oberstdorf	Lahti	Willingen	Willingen	Oslo	Lillehammer	Trondheim	Vikersund	Planica	Planica					88
2018–19	q	38	38	35	34	49	30	q	32	32	32	44	40	33	32	7	29	21	11	46	40	36	28	36	q	q	19	–					88
2019–20	Wisła	Kuusamo	Nizhny Tagil	Nizhny Tagil	Klingenthal	Engelberg	Engelberg	Oberstdorf	Garmisch-Partenkirchen	Innsbruck	Bischofshofen	Val di Fiemme	Val di Fiemme	Titisee-Neustadt	Titisee-Neustadt	Zakopane	Sapporo	Sapporo	Willingen	Tauplitz	Tauplitz	Râșnov	Râșnov	Lahti	Lahti	Oslo	Lillehammer						0
2019–20	q	q	q	45	33	–	–	–	–	–	–	–	–	–	–	–	q	36	–	–	–	–	–	–	–	–	–						0
2022–23	Wisła	Wisła	Kuusamo	Kuusamo	Titisee-Neustadt	Titisee-Neustadt	Engelberg	Engelberg	Oberstdorf	Garmisch-Partenkirchen	Innsbruck	Bischofshofen	Zakopane	Sapporo	Sapporo	Sapporo	Tauplitz	Tauplitz	Willingen	Willingen	Lake Placid	Lake Placid	Râșnov	Oslo	Oslo	Lillehammer	Lillehammer	Vikersund	Vikersund	Lahti	Planica	Planica	0
2022–23	–	–	–	–	–	–	–	–	–	–	–	–	–	q	q	–	–	–	–	–	–	–	–	–	–	–	–	–	–	–	–	–	0
2023–24	Kuusamo	Kuusamo	Lillehammer	Lillehammer	Klingenthal	Klingenthal	Engelberg	Engelberg	Oberstdorf	Garmisch-Partenkirchen	Innsbruck	Bischofshofen	Wisła	Zakopane	Willingen	Willingen	Lake Placid	Lake Placid	Sapporo	Sapporo	Oberstdorf	Oberstdorf	Lahti	Lahti	Oslo	Oslo	Trondheim	Trondheim	Vikersund	Vikersund	Planica	Planica	10
2023–24	–	–	–	–	–	–	–	–	–	–	–	–	–	–	–	–	–	–	30	43	–	–	38	28	47	q	49	39	27	–	29	–	10

== See also ==
- List of athletes with the most appearances at Olympic Games

Olympic Games
Preceded by Ayumi Ogasawara	Flagbearer for Japan; 2018 Pyeongchang (with Sara Takanashi)	Succeeded by Akito Watabe; Arisa Go
