= Holger Freitag =

East German ski jumper (born 1963)

Personal information
- Nationality: East Germany
- Born: 8 October 1963 (age 62) Erlabrunn, East Germany
- Height: 1.73 m (5 ft 8 in)

Sport
- Sport: Skiing

World Cup career
- Seasons: 1981–1986
- Indiv. starts: 26
- Indiv. podiums: 1
- Indiv. wins: 1
- Updated on 10 February 2016

Holger Freitag (born 8 October 1963) is an East German former ski jumper.

== Career ==
In the World Cup he finished six times among the top 10, his best result being a victory from Harrachov in January 1983. He is the father of German ski jumper Richard Freitag.

== World Cup ==
=== Standings ===
Season	Overall	4H
1980/81	—	64
1981/82	—	35
1982/83	24	32
1983/84	29	15
1984/85	—	79
1985/86	42	—

=== Wins ===
No.	Season	Date	Location	Hill	Size
1	1982/83	8 January 1983	(Czechoslovakia) Harrachov	Čerťák K120	LH
