= FIS Ski Flying World Championships 2002 =

2002 edition of the FIS Ski-Flying World Championships

- Official logo for the FIS Ski Flying World Championships 2002.
- Host city: Harrachov, Czech Republic
- Nations: 16
- Athletes: 50
- Events: 1
- Opening: 7 March
- Closing: 10 March
- Main venue: Čerťák
- Website: Skiflying-harrachov.cz

The FIS Ski Flying World Ski Championships 2002 took place on 9 and 10 March 2002 at Čerťák in Harrachov, Czech Republic for the third time. Harrachov hosted the championships previously in Czechoslovakia in 1983 and 1992. This marked the first time the event took place on separate days. Germany's Sven Hannawald led after the first day, but the results were allowed to stand after two jumps after weather cancelled the final two jumps on the second day. Hannawald became the first repeat winner of the championships as a result. Finland's Matti Hautamäki had the longest jump of the competition with his first-round jump of 202.5 m.

== Individual ==
9 March 2002

Medal	Athlete	Points
Gold	Sven Hannawald (GER)	396.3
Silver	Martin Schmitt (GER)	368.3
Bronze	Matti Hautamäki (FIN)	363.4

== Medal table ==
Rank	Nation	Gold	Silver	Bronze	Total
1	Germany (GER)	1	1	0	2
2	Finland (FIN)	0	0	1	1
Totals (2 entries)		1	1	1	3
