= Čerťák =

Ski jumping stadium in Harrachov, Czech Republic

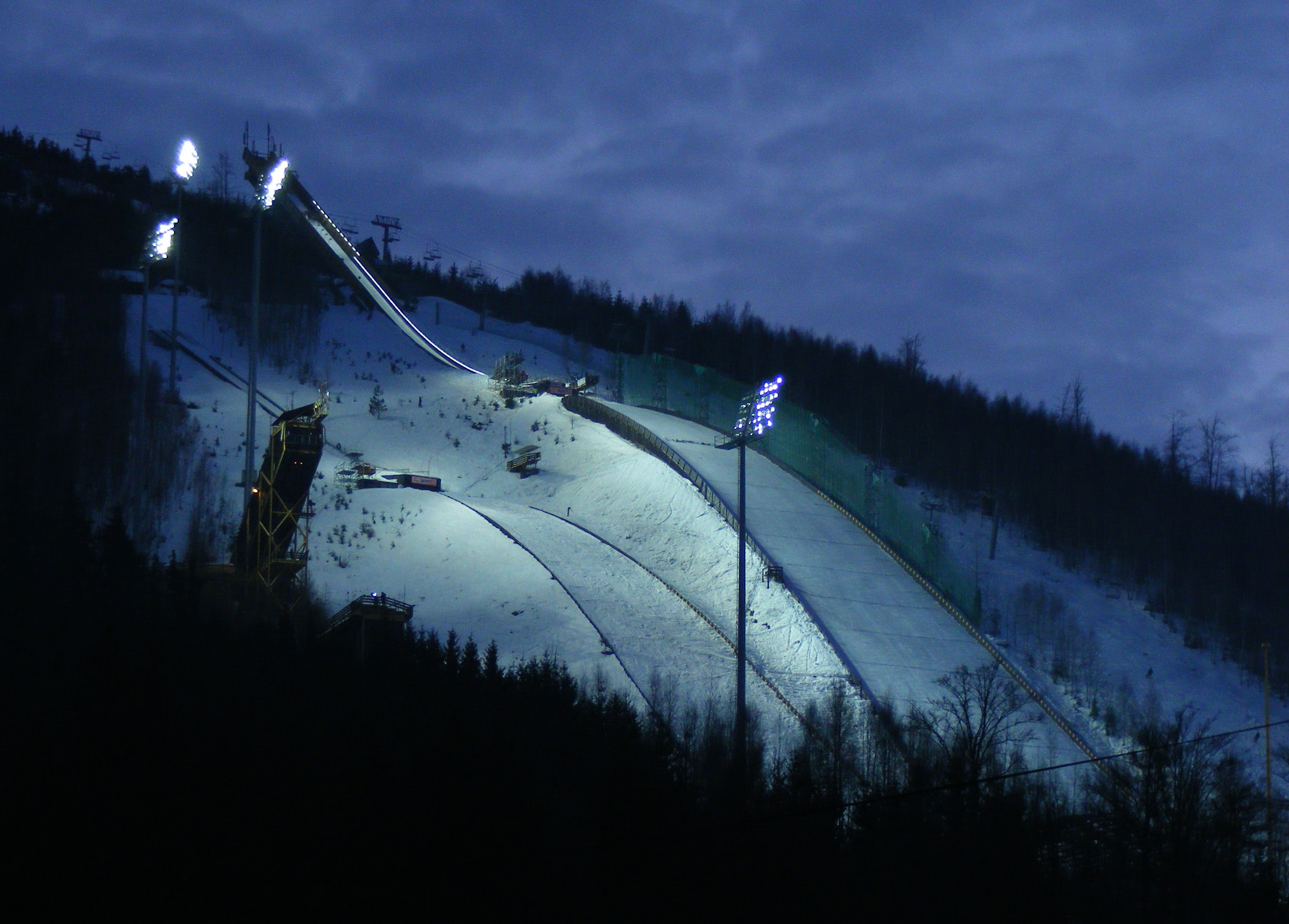
- Location: Harrachov; Czech Republic
- Coordinates: 50.767°N 15.429°E
- Opened: 5 Jan 1980 (LH); 27 Mar 1980 (FH)
- Renovated: 1992
- Closed: 2014

Size
- K–point: 125, 185 m
- Hill size: 142, 205 m
- Longest jump (unofficial / fall): 225.0 m (738 ft)*, hand measure 220.0 m (722 ft)*, video measure (Slovenia) Jurij Tepeš (3 February 2013)
- Hill record: Flying Hill: 214.5 m (704 ft) (Finland) Matti Hautamäki (Austria) Thomas Morgenstern Large Hill: 145.5 m (477 ft) (Finland) Janne Ahonen

Top events
- Ski Flying World Championships: 1983, 1992, 2002, 2014

Čerťák is a ski jumping stadium with two hills in Harrachov in the Czech Republic.

It was built in 1979 and both hill officially opened in 1980. The venue is most notable for being one of five ski flying hills in the world, though it also has three smaller hills close by. It is owned by the sports club TJ Jiskra Harrachov. Audience capacity is about 50,000. Despite being a flying hill, only two world records have ever set at Čerťák, both in the 1980s. It was also during this time, and into the early 1990s, that many horrific accidents occurred.

== The hills ==
The hills are located on the north side of the mountain Čertova hora, not far from the border to Poland. The first hill in Harrachov was built in 1922, but at a different location in town. Later in the 1920s the first hill in Čerťák was built. It was eventually expanded and supplemented with more hills. The ski flying hill was built in 1979 and opened in March 1980.

The large hill in Harrachov was built at the same time as the ski flying hill, and renovated in 1992. This hill has a K-point of 125 m and a hill size of 142 m. The official record is 145.5 m, set by Janne Ahonen on 12 December 2004 during the 2004–05 World Cup season. The unofficial record is 151 m set by Martin Koch (Austria) on 17 December 2004 in a Continental Cup event.

The normal hill has K-point of 90 m, a hill size of 100 m and a hill record of 102.5 m. The two smaller hills have K-points of 70 m (hill record 77 m) and K-point 40 meters (hill record 43.5 m). The standard hill has plastic mats, allowing summer use.

The ski flying hill in Harrachov garnered an early reputation of being quite dangerous from which to jump. In its early years, jumpers achieved a significant height over the knoll, up to 12 m. The result of this height was that a gust of wind or error from the jumper could end catastrophically, and there were indeed many injuries from bad falls. During the World Championship in 1983, injuries were suffered by Steinar Bråten, Horst Bulau and Jens Weißflog. In 1985, Pavel Ploc suffered a violent crash. The venue was eventually closed by the FIS and rebuilt between 1989 and 1992, and has since kept the requirements from FIS. Accidents have still occurred, however: in 1992, Andreas Goldberger fell out of the air at the highest point of his jump and crashed very hard.

== Events ==
=== Normal hill ===
Date	Hillsize	Competition	Winner	Second	Third align=right|
12 December 1997	K90	WC	(Japan) Masahiko Harada	(Slovenia) Primož Peterka (Germany) Dieter Thoma	

=== Large hill ===
Date	Hillsize	Competition	Winner	Second	Third
10 January 1981	K120	WC	(Norway) Roger Ruud	(Austria) Armin Kogler	(Norway) Per Bergerud (Austria) Hubert Neuper
8 January 1983	K120	WC	(East Germany) Holger Freitag	(Finland) Markku Pusenius	(East Germany) Klaus Ostwald
9 January 1983	K120	WC	(Czechoslovakia) Pavel Ploc	(East Germany) Klaus Ostwald	(Finland) Markku Pusenius
14 January 1984	K120	WC	(Czechoslovakia) Jiří Parma	(East Germany) Jens Weißflog	(Czechoslovakia) Pavel Ploc
11 January 1986	K120	WC	(Finland) Matti Nykänen	(Austria) Ernst Vettori	(Czechoslovakia) Jiří Parma
10 January 1988	K120	WC	cancelled		
15 January 1989	K120	WC	(Sweden) Jan Boklöv	(Finland) Risto Laakonen	(Czechoslovakia) Ladislav Dluhoš
12 January 1990	K120	WC	(West Germany) Dieter Thoma	(Czechoslovakia) Ladislav Dluhoš	(Czechoslovakia) Jiří Parma
16 January 1993	K120	WC	lack of snow		
17 January 1993	K120	WC	lack of snow		
14 December 1996	K120	WC	(Japan) Kazuyoshi Funaki	(Slovenia) Primož Peterka	(Japan) Takanobu Okabe
15 December 1996	K120	WC	(Slovenia) Primož Peterka	(Austria) Andreas Goldberger	(Norway) Kristian Brenden
19 December 1998	K120	WC	(Finland) Janne Ahonen	(Germany) Ronny Hornschuh	(Japan) Kazuyoshi Funaki
20 December 1998	K120	WC	(Finland) Janne Ahonen	(Japan) Noriaki Kasai	(Austria) Andreas Widhölzl
7 February 1999	K120	WC (rep FH)	(Finland) Janne Ahonen	(Norway) Lasse Ottesen	(Czech Republic) Jakub Sucháček
11 December 2004	HS142	WC	(Poland) Adam Małysz	(Finland) Janne Ahonen	(Germany) Georg Späth
12 December 2004	HS142	WC	(Finland) Janne Ahonen	(Norway) Roar Ljøkelsøy	(Czech Republic) Jakub Janda
10 December 2005	HS142	WC	(Switzerland) Andreas Küttel	(Germany) Michael Uhrmann	(Finland) Janne Ahonen
11 December 2005	HS142	WC	(Czech Republic) Jakub Janda	(Finland) Janne Ahonen	(Switzerland) Andreas Küttel
9 December 2006	HS142	WC	lack of snow		
10 December 2006	HS142	WC	lack of snow		
12 December 2009	HS142	WC	lack of snow		
13 December 2009	HS142	WC	lack of snow		
11 December 2010	HS142	WC	strong wind; rescheduled to Engelberg		
12 December 2010	HS142	WC	strong wind; rescheduled to Zakopane		
9 December 2011	HS142	WC	(Austria) Gregor Schlierenzauer	(Japan) Daiki Ito	(Norway) Anders Bardal
10 December 2011	HS142	WC-T	Norway Tom Hilde; Bjørn Einar Romøren; Vegard Sklett; Anders Bardal	Austria Thomas Morgenstern; David Zauner; Andreas Kofler; Gregor Schlierenzauer	Slovenia Jernej Damjan; Jure Šinkovec; Peter Prevc; Robert Kranjec
11 December 2011	HS142	WC	(Germany) Richard Freitag	(Austria) Thomas Morgenstern	(Germany) Severin Freund

=== Flying hill ===
Date	Hillsize	Competition	Winner	Second	Third
28-29 March 1980	K165	KOP	(Canada) Steve Collins	(Austria) Armin Kogler	(Norway) Tom Levorstad
19-20 March 1983	K185	SFWC	(East Germany) Klaus Ostwald	(Czechoslovakia) Pavel Ploc	(Finland) Matti Nykänen
23 February 1985	K185	WC	(Norway) Ole Gunnar Fidjestøl	(Socialist Federal Republic of Yugoslavia) Miran Tepeš	(Czechoslovakia) Jiří Parma
24 February 1985	K185	WC	strong wind		
18 March 1989	K185	WC	(Norway) Ole Gunnar Fidjestøl	(United States) Mike Holland	(Sweden) Jan Boklöv
19 March 1989	K185	WC	strong wind		
21 March 1992	K185	SFWC(d1) / WC	(Japan) Noriaki Kasai	(Austria) Andreas Goldberger	(Italy) Roberto Cecon
22 March 1992	K185	SFWC(d2) / WC	stopped and cancelled; strong wind		
World Championships Overall (21-22 March)			(Japan) Noriaki Kasai	(Austria) Andreas Goldberger	(Italy) Roberto Cecon
9 March 1996	K185	WC	(Austria) Andreas Goldberger	(Germany) Christof Duffner	(Czech Republic) Jaroslav Sakala
9 March 1996	K185	WC	cancelled		
6 February 1999	K185	WC	next day on large hill		
13 January 2001	K185	WC	(Poland) Adam Małysz	(Germany) Martin Schmitt	(Finland) Risto Jussilainen
14 January 2001	K185	WC	(Poland) Adam Małysz	(Finland) Janne Ahonen	(Germany) Martin Schmitt
10 March 2002	K185	SFWC	(Germany) Sven Hannawald	(Germany) Martin Schmitt	(Finland) Matti Hautamäki
19 January 2008	HS205	WC	strong wind		
20 January 2008	HS205	WC	(Finland) Janne Ahonen	(Norway) Tom Hilde	(Norway) Anders Jacobsen
(night) 8 January 2011	HS205	WC	(Austria) Martin Koch	(Austria) Thomas Morgenstern	(Poland) Adam Małysz
9 January 2011	HS205	WC	(Austria) Thomas Morgenstern	(Switzerland) Simon Ammann	(Czech Republic) Roman Koudelka
(night) 2 February 2013	HS205	WC	first event next day		
3 February 2013	HS205	WC	(Austria) Gregor Schlierenzauer	(Slovenia) Robert Kranjec	(Czech Republic) Jan Matura
3 February 2013	HS205	WC	(Austria) Gregor Schlierenzauer	(Czech Republic) Jan Matura	(Slovenia) Jurij Tepeš
(night) 15 March 2014	HS205	SFWC-I	(Germany) Severin Freund	(Norway) Anders Bardal	(Slovenia) Peter Prevc
17 March 2014	HS205	SFWC-T	strong wind		

== Hill record ==
=== Large hill ===
Date		Length
5 January 1980	(Czechoslovakia) Ladislav Jirásko	59.0 m (194 ft)
6 January 1980	(Czechoslovakia) František Novotný	75.0 m (246 ft)
6 January 1980	(Czechoslovakia) Jaroslav Balcar	88.0 m (289 ft)
6 January 1980	(Czechoslovakia) Ivo Peterka	91.0 m (299 ft)
6 January 1980	(Czechoslovakia) Břetislav Počík	97.0 m (318 ft)
6 January 1980	(Czechoslovakia) Ladislav Jirásko	101.0 m (331 ft)
6 January 1980	(Czechoslovakia) Ivo Felix	103.0 m (338 ft)
6 January 1980	(Czechoslovakia) Ivo Felix	109.0 m (358 ft)
10 January 1981	(Austria) Armin Kogler	122.0 m (400 ft)
6 February 1983	(Czechoslovakia) Pavel Ploc	122.0 m (400 ft)

Date		Length
13 January 1985	(Czechoslovakia) Pavel Ploc	123.0 m (404 ft)
13 January 1996	(Austria) Andreas Goldberger	129.0 m (423 ft)
14 January 1996	(Czech Republic) Jakub Sucháček	137.0 m (449 ft)
14 January 1996	(Japan) Kazuyoshi Funaki	140.0 m (459 ft)
14 January 1996	(Japan) Kazuyoshi Funaki	141.5 m (464 ft)
10 December 2004	(Austria) Andreas Widhölzl	142.0 m (466 ft)
11 December 2004	(Poland) Adam Małysz	143.0 m (469 ft)
12 December 2004	(Finland) Janne Ahonen	145.5 m (477 ft)
17 December 2004	(Austria) Martin Koch	151.0 m (495 ft)

=== Flying hill ===
==== Official ====
Date		Length
27 March 1980	(Austria) Armin Kogler	176.0 m (577 ft)
19 March 1983	(Czech Republic) Pavel Ploc	181.0 m (594 ft)
23 February 1985	(Norway) Ole Gunnar Fidjestøl	183.0 m (600 ft)
9 March 1996	(Norway) Roar Ljøkelsøy	201.0 m (659 ft)
9 March 1996	(Austria) Andreas Goldberger	201.0 m (659 ft)
9 March 1996	(Czech Republic) Jakub Jiroutek	201.0 m (659 ft)
9 March 1996	(Czech Republic) Jan Balcar	203.0 m (666 ft)
9 March 1996	(Austria) Andreas Goldberger	204.0 m (669 ft)

Date		Length
13 January 2001	(Finland) Matti Hautamäki	205.0 m (673 ft)
13 January 2001	(Finland) Janne Ahonen	206.5 m (677 ft)
13 January 2001	(Poland) Adam Małysz	206.5 m (677 ft)
14 January 2001	(Finland) Risto Jussilainen	212.5 m (697 ft)
9 March 2002	(Norway) Anders Bardal	212.5 m (697 ft)
9 March 2002	(Finland) Matti Hautamäki	214.5 m (704 ft)
18 March 2008	(Austria) Thomas Morgenstern	214.5 m (704 ft)

==== Invalid ====
Date		Length
22 March 1992	(Germany) Christof Duffner	194.0 m (636 ft)
19 January 2008	(Austria) Thomas Morgenstern	214.5 m (704 ft)
9 January 2011	(Switzerland) Simon Ammann	215.5 m (707 ft)
3 February 2013	(Slovenia) Jurij Tepeš	220.0 m (722 ft)
