= Ole Gunnar Fidjestøl =

Norwegian ski jumper

Personal information
- Nationality: Norway
- Born: 21 March 1960 (age 66) Kristiansand, Norway
- Height: 1.88 m (6 ft 2 in)

Sport
- Sport: Skiing

World Cup career
- Seasons: 1983–1992
- Indiv. starts: 121
- Indiv. podiums: 11
- Indiv. wins: 4
- Team starts: 1

Achievements and titles
- Personal bests: 190 m (623 ft); Planica, 15 March 1987
Medal record
Men's ski jumping
Olympic Games
Bronze medal – third place	1988 Calgary	Team LH
FIS Nordic World Ski Championships
Silver medal – second place	1987 Oberstdorf	Team LH
Silver medal – second place	1989 Lahti	Team LH
Men's ski flying
FIS Ski Flying World Championships
Gold medal – first place	1988 Oberstdorf	Individual
- Updated on 10 February 2016

Ole Gunnar Fidjestøl (born 21 March 1960) is a Norwegian former ski jumper.

== Career ==
He won silver medals in the team large hill event at the Nordic World Ski Championships (1987, 1989) as well as a bronze medal in the team large hill at the 1988 Winter Olympics.

Fidjestøl won the 1988 Ski Flying World Championships in Oberstdorf and earned four additional career victories from 1985 to 1989. He won also four individual titles and one team title at the national level.

Since retiring from competition, he has been involved administratively with Vikersund IF and the football club Modum FK.

== World Cup ==
=== Standings ===
Season	Overall	4H	SF
1982/83	59	—	N/A
1983/84	22	5	N/A
1984/85	16	37	N/A
1985/86	19	17	N/A
1986/87	8	14	N/A
1987/88	9	47	N/A
1988/89	4	10	N/A
1989/90	16	12	N/A
1990/91	40	19	—
1991/92	49	—	19

=== Wins ===
No.	Season	Date	Location	Hill	Size
1	1984/85	23 February 1985	(Czechoslovakia) Harrachov	Čerťák K180	FH
2	1986/87	15 March 1987	(Socialist Federal Republic of Yugoslavia) Planica	Velikanka bratov Gorišek K185	FH
3	1988/89	21 January 1989	(East Germany) Oberhof	Rennsteigschanze K90	NH
4	1988/89	19 March 1989	(Czechoslovakia) Harrachov	Čerťák K180	FH
