= Pavel Ploc =

Czech former ski jumper (born 1964)

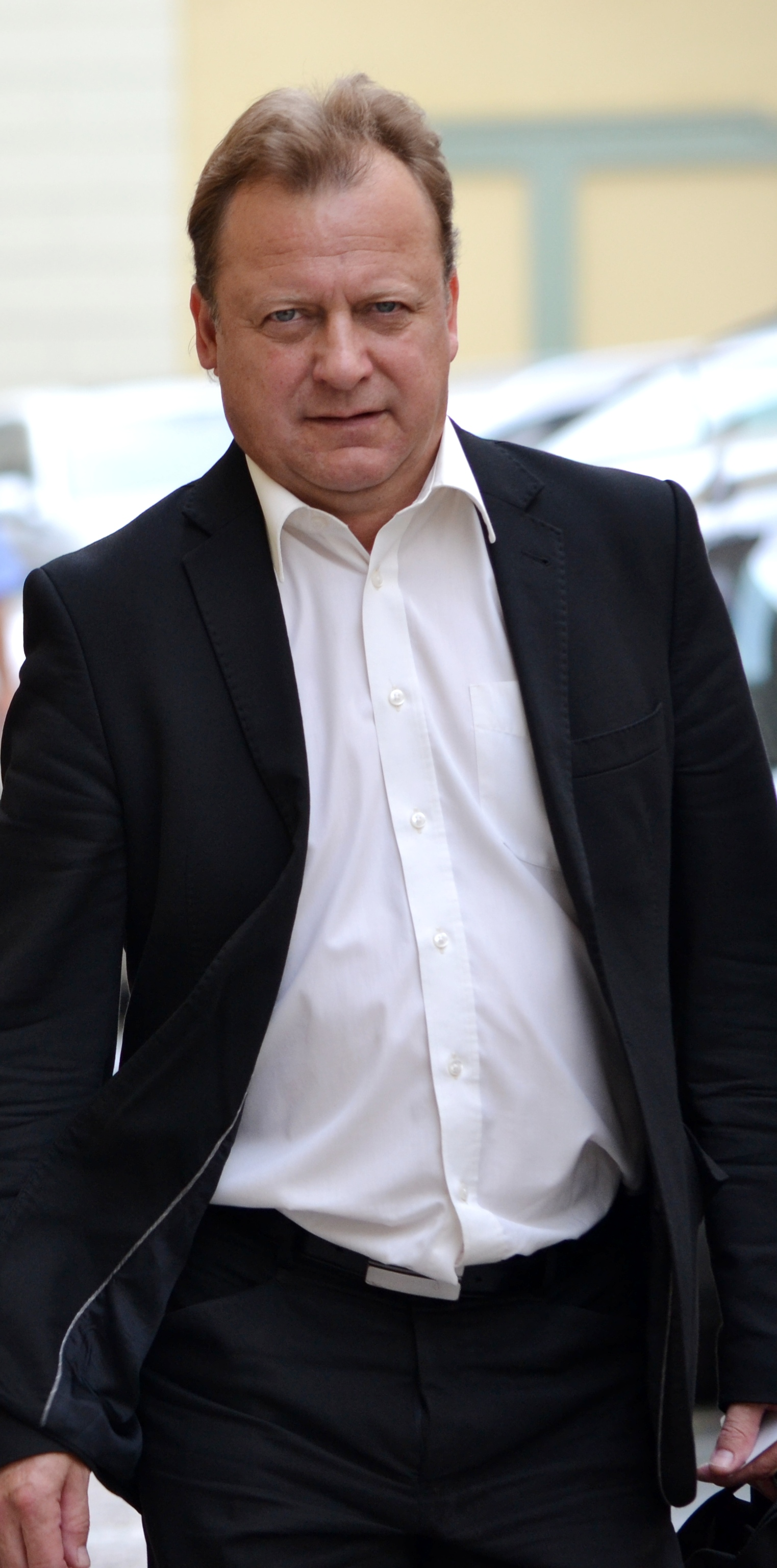

Personal information
- Nationality: Czechoslovakia
- Born: 15 June 1964 (age 62) Jilemnice, Czechoslovakia
- Height: 175 cm (5 ft 9 in)

Sport
- Sport: Skiing

World Cup career
- Seasons: 1982–1992
- Indiv. starts: 132
- Indiv. podiums: 27
- Indiv. wins: 10
Medal record
Men's ski jumping
Olympic Games
Silver medal – second place	1988 Calgary	Individual NH
Bronze medal – third place	1984 Sarajevo	Individual LH
FIS Nordic World Ski Championships
Bronze medal – third place	1984 Engelberg	Team LH
Bronze medal – third place	1989 Lahti	Team LH
Men's ski flying
FIS Ski Flying World Championships
Silver medal – second place	1983 Harrachov	Individual
Bronze medal – third place	1985 Planica	Individual
- Updated on 10 February 2016

Pavel Ploc (Czech pronunciation: [ˈpavɛl ˈplots], born 15 June 1964) is a Czech former ski jumper who competed for Czechoslovakia, winning two Olympic medals. After the end of his ski-jumping career, he entered politics, serving as an MP for the Czech Social Democratic Party (ČSSD) from 2006 to 2017.

== Sporting career ==
On 19 March 1983, at the 7th Ski Flying World Championships, he tied the ski jumping world record distance at 181 metres (594 ft) on Čerťák in Harrachov, Czechoslovakia.

At the Winter Olympics, he earned a silver in the individual normal hill in 1988 and a bronze in the individual large hill in 1984. Ploc also earned two bronze medals in the Team large hill event at the FIS Nordic World Ski Championships (1984, 1989). He also won two medals at the FIS Ski Flying World Championships with a silver in 1983 and a bronze in 1985.

== Political career ==
Ploc finished his active ski-jumping career in 1992, and in 1996 opened a bed-and-breakfast in Harrachov, Czech Republic. From 1996 to 2002 he was a member of Harrachov town council. He unsuccessfully ran for a seat in the Czech Parliament in 2002, but in 2006 he was elected as a member of the lower chamber of the Czech Parliament for the Czech Social Democratic Party (ČSSD).

While sitting as an MP, he was elected to the Liberec regional assembly for ČSSD in the 2008 regional elections. He did not stand in the regional elections in 2012. In June 2012, Pavel Ploc and the independent Jaroslav Škárka were the only two MPs who voted against the extradition of David Rath for prosecution.

Ploc ran in the 2016 Senate elections as the ČSSD candidate in District No. 34 - Liberec, finishing 5th with 5.77% of the vote, and failing to advance to the second round. In the 2017 parliamentary elections, he attempted to defend his seat in the Liberec region, but was unsuccessful.

== World Cup ==
=== Standings ===
Season	Overall	4H	SF
1981–82	38	46	N/A
1982–83	11	7	N/A
1983–84	3rd place, bronze medalist(s)	5	N/A
1984–85	7	10	N/A
1985–86	13	48	N/A
1986–87	39	14	N/A
1987–88	2nd place, silver medalist(s)	28	N/A
1988–89	19	11	N/A
1989–90	7	18	N/A
1990–91	20	—	—

=== Wins ===
No.	Season	Date	Location	Hill	Size
1	1982–83	9 January 1983	(Czechoslovakia) Harrachov	Čerťák K120	LH
2	1983–84	9 March 1984	(Norway) Lillehammer	Balbergbakken K120	LH
3	1983–84	25 March 1984	(Socialist Federal Republic of Yugoslavia) Planica	Bloudkova velikanka K120	LH
4	1985–86	1 January 1986	(West Germany) Garmisch-Partenkirchen	Große Olympiaschanze K107	LH
5	1987–88	12 December 1987	(United States) Lake Placid	MacKenzie Intervale K114	LH
6	1987–88	13 December 1987	(United States) Lake Placid	MacKenzie Intervale K86	NH
7	1987–88	30 December 1987	(West Germany) Oberstdorf	Schattenbergschanze K115	LH
8	1987–88	22 January 1988	(Switzerland) Gstaad	Mattenschanze K88	NH
9	1988–89	14 January 1989	(Czechoslovakia) Liberec	Ještěd A K120	LH
10	1989–90	11 March 1990	(Sweden) Sollefteå	Hallstabacken K107	LH

== Ski jumping world record ==
Date	Hill	Location	Metres	Feet
19 March 1983	Čerťák K185	Harrachov, Czechoslovakia	181	594
