= Vítkovice =

Vítkovice may refer to places in the Czech Republic:

- Vítkovice (Semily District), a municipality and village in the Liberec Region
- Vítkovice (Ostrava), a district of Ostrava in the Moravian-Silesian Region
  - MFK Vítkovice, a football club
  - HC Vítkovice Ridera, an ice hockey club
- Vítkovice, a village and part of Klatovy in the Plzeň Region
- Vítkovice, a village and part of Lubenec in the Ústí nad Labem Region

== See also ==
- Vítkov (disambiguation)
- Witkowski
