= Manfred Steiner (ski jumper) =

Austrian ski jumper

Personal information
- Nationality: Austria
- Born: 27 November 1962 (age 63) Wörgl, Austria

Sport
- Sport: Skiing

World Cup career
- Seasons: 1980–1985
- Indiv. starts: 21
- Indiv. podiums: 2
- Indiv. wins: 1
- Updated on 10 February 2016

Manfred Steiner (born 27 November 1962) is an Austrian former ski jumper.

== World Cup ==
=== Standings ===
Season	Overall	4H
1979/80	—	113
1980/81	46	72
1981/82	38	29
1982/83	63	24
1983/84	24	69
1984/85	—	110

=== Wins ===
No.	Season	Date	Location	Hill	Size
1	1983/84	24 January 1984	(Japan) Sapporo	Ōkurayama K110	LH
