= Balbergbakken =

Ski jumping hill

Coordinates: 61°9′19.6″N 10°26′55.9″E

- Balbergbakkene
- Location: Fåberg; Lillehammer Municipality; Norway
- Opened: 1972
- Closed: 1992

Size
- K–point: K-120, K-40, K-25, K-15
- Hill record: Tom Levorstad (130.5 m in 1981)

Balbergbakken or Balbergbakkene was a ski jumping hill complex located near the village of Fåberg in Lillehammer Municipality in Innlandet county, Norway. The centerpiece consisted of a large hill with a construction point of 120 meters (390 ft) (K-120), in addition to three smaller K-40, K-25 and K-15 hills. The venue was opened in 1972, having cost slightly more than one million Norwegian krone (NOK) after significant cost overruns. Balbergbakken hosted three Norwegian Championships, in 1973, 1978 and 1983, and a FIS Ski Jumping World Cup in 1984. The hill record of 130.5 metres (428 ft) was set by Tom Levorstad in 1981. It was planned that the venue would be used for the 1994 Winter Olympics, but because of lack of infrastructure, the new Lysgårdsbakken was built instead. Balbergbakken was closed in 1992.

== History ==
The old hill at Lysgård in Lillehammer was closed in 1964, and Lillehammer SK spent some time deciding where to build a new venue. Storhove, Vingrom, and Kanthaugen were all considered as locations, although Balberg was eventually chosen. The municipal council passed the plans in May 1969. The original cost estimate was for 347,065 kr. The hill opened in 1972, having cost more than 1 million kr to be built. In addition to the large K-120 hill, it consisted of three smaller training hills, at K-40, K-25 and K-15. The hills were owned by Lillehammer SK.

The construction was controversial in Lillehammer, both amongst the general public and politicians. The chief of administration had doubted whether he should recommend construction. The original plans had called for both a large and normal hill, but lack of funding meant that the normal hill was never built, meaning that the number of competitions in the hill would be severely limited. The cost overruns were largely created by errors in the plans, which estimated too little earthwork to fill the hillside, and not enough blasting. To cut costs, a floodlighting system was taken out of the plans, so the venue could not be used during the evenings, limiting the amount of time the venue could be used. It was also a concern that very few locals were able to jump on such a large hill. Many politicians stated in 1972 that the money should have been spent instead on an indoor hall for handball. The first trial jump was made by Helge Nordstrand, while Jan Stenbekk is credited with the first hill record, at 110.5 metres (363 ft).

In Lillehammer's bids for the 1992 and 1994 Winter Olympics, Balbergbakken was the proposed site of ski jumping. Lillehammer was awarded the 1994 Winter Olympics in 1988, but a year later the plans to use Balbergbanen were abandoned. The venue was regarded as unsuitable; for instance 30 million kr would have to be spent on building a new access road. In addition, a new water and sewer system, new stands, participant facilities and a normal hill would have to be built. The available space at Balbergbakken was limited, and the organizers saw it as advantageous to have the ski stadium close to the ski jumping hills.

== Events ==
The hill was used for 31 tournaments, of which six had to be cancelled because of wind or snow conditions. The tournaments included the Norwegian Championships in 1973, 1978 and 1983; the Norwegian champions in Balbergbakken were Nils-Per Skarseth (1973) and Per Bergerud (1978 and 1983). A FIS Ski Jumping World Cup race was held on 9 March 1984. It saw Pavel Ploc win ahead of Matti Nykänen and Ernst Vettori. The event drew 5,000 spectators. The World Cup race incurred a large loss, with the organizers only covering half of the 260,000 kr it cost to host. The hill record was set by Tom Levorstad in 1981, who reached 130.5 meters. The final race was scheduled to be the 1992 Junior Norwegian Championships, but they were canceled because of lack of snow.

== Works cited ==
- Fåberg historielag (1993). Dølaby med OL-vekst (in Norwegian). ISBN 82-90385-14-5.
- Thoresen, Arne (2007). Lengst gjennom lufta (in Norwegian). Oslo: Versal. ISBN 978-82-8188-030-6.
