= Nordic Tournament 1999 =

The 1999 Nordic Tournament was the third edition and took place in Lahti, Trondheim, Falun and Oslo between 6–14 March 1999.

== Results ==
Date	Place	Hill	Size	Winner	Second	Third	Ref.
6 March 1999	(Finland) Lahti	Salpausselkä K-90 (night)	NH	(Japan) Kazuyoshi Funaki	(Austria) Reinhard Schwarzenberger	(Germany) Sven Hannawald	
9 March 1999	(Norway) Trondheim	Granåsen K-120 (night)	LH	(Japan) Noriaki Kasai	(Austria) Stefan Horngacher	(Japan) Masahiko Harada	
11 March 1999	(Sweden) Falun	Lugnet K-115 (night)	LH	(Germany) Martin Schmitt	(Japan) Hideharu Miyahira	(Japan) Masahiko Harada	
14 March 1999	(Norway) Oslo	Holmenkollbakken K-115	LH	(Japan) Noriaki Kasai	(Germany) Martin Schmitt	(Japan) Kazuyoshi Funaki	

== Overall ==
Pos	Ski Jumper	Points
1	(Japan) Noriaki Kasai	608.8
2	(Japan) Kazuyoshi Funaki	600.6
3	(Germany) Sven Hannawald	591.7
4	(Japan) Masahiko Harada	583.7
5	(Finland) Janne Ahonen	577.7
6	(Japan) Hideharu Miyahira	564.8
7	(Austria) Reinhard Schwarzenberger	550.9
8	(Austria) Stefan Horngacher	545.7
9	(Austria) Wolfgang Loitzl	537.6
10	(Czech Republic) Jakub Sucháček	533.0
