= FIS Ski Flying World Championships 1992 =

1992 edition of the FIS Ski-Flying World Championships

The 1992 FIS Ski Flying World Ski Championships took place on 21–22 March 1992 at Čerťák in Harrachov, Czechoslovakia for the second time. Harrachov previously hosted the event in 1983. It is the first Ski Flying World Championships in which Germany competed as a unified nation since their October 1990 reunification. Japan's Noriaki Kasai became the first non-European to both medal and win at the event.

== Results ==
| Medal | Athlete | Points |
|---|---|---|
| Gold | (Japan) Noriaki Kasai | 392.5 |
| Silver | (Austria) Andreas Goldberger | 377.0 |
| Bronze | (Italy) Roberto Cecon | 376.0 |

== Medal table ==
| Rank | Nation | Gold | Silver | Bronze | Total |
|---|---|---|---|---|---|
| 1 | Japan (JPN) | 1 | 0 | 0 | 1 |
| 2 | Austria (AUT) | 0 | 1 | 0 | 1 |
| 3 | Italy (ITA) | 0 | 0 | 1 | 1 |
| Totals (3 entries) | | 1 | 1 | 1 | 3 |
