= Marikollen =

Ski jumping hill in Akershus, Norway

Coordinates: 59°55′15″N 11°03′17″E

- Location: Rælingen; Norway
- Opened: 1959
- Renovated: 1986

Size
- K–point: K-88
- Hill size: HS 95
- Hill record: 100 m (328 ft) (Norway) Fredrik Bjerkeengen (30 August 2009)

Marikollen is a ski jumping hill located at Rælingen in Akershus, Norway. It is the site of Marikollen skisenter which was opened in 1959 and is owned by Rælingen Skiklubb. There is an alpine ski slope, ski jump and sledding facility. The facility hosted one FIS Ski jumping World Cup event in 1987. Fredrik Bjerkeengen holds the ski slope record.

== World cup ==
=== Men ===
Date	Size	Winner	Second	Third
20 Mar 1987	K-85	(Norway) Vegard Opaas	(Norway) Hroar Stjernen	(Austria) Ernst Vettori
