= Mumlava =

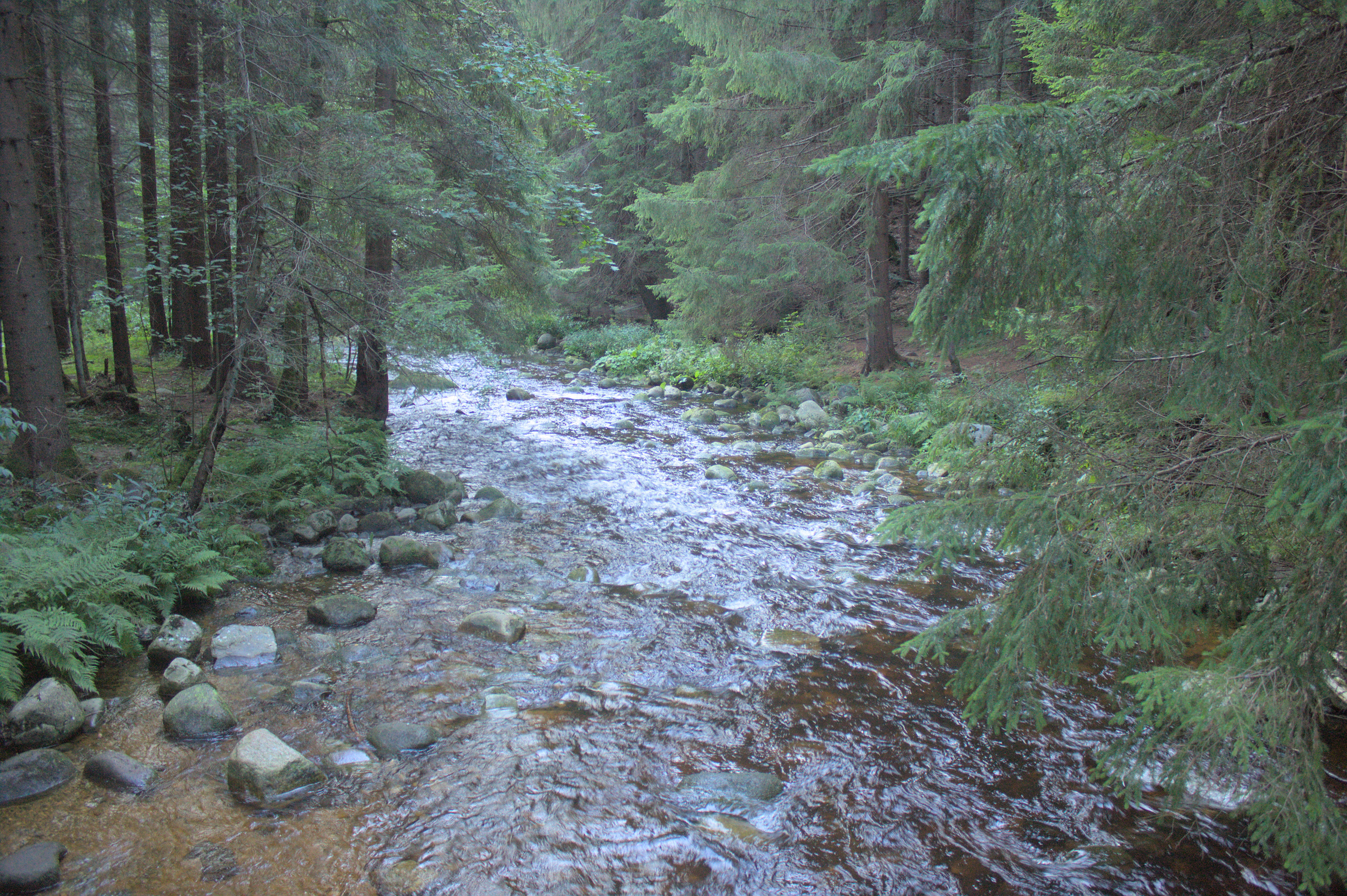
- The Mumlava in Harrachov

Location
- Country: Czech Republic
- Region: Liberec

Physical characteristics
- Source
  - location: Vítkovice, Giant Mountains
  - coordinates: 50°45′22″N 15°31′55″E
  - elevation: 1,364 m (4,475 ft)
- Mouth
  - location: Jizera
  - coordinates: 50°45′42″N 15°23′48″E
  - elevation: 570 m (1,870 ft)
- Length: 12.6 km (7.8 mi)
- Basin size: 51.6 km^{2} (19.9 sq mi)
- Discharge
  - average: 1.98 m^{3}/s (70 cu ft/s) near estuary

Basin features
- Progression: Jizera→ Elbe→ North Sea

The Mumlava (German: Mummel) is a mountain river in the Czech Republic, a left tributary of the Jizera River. It flows through the Liberec Region. It is 12.6 km (7.8 mi) long. The river is known for the Mumlava Waterfall, which is the biggest waterfall in the Czech Republic.

== Etymology ==
The German name of the river is Mummel. It was derived from the word mummeln, i.e. 'mumble', referring to the sounds the river makes. The Czech name was created from the German name.

== Characteristic ==
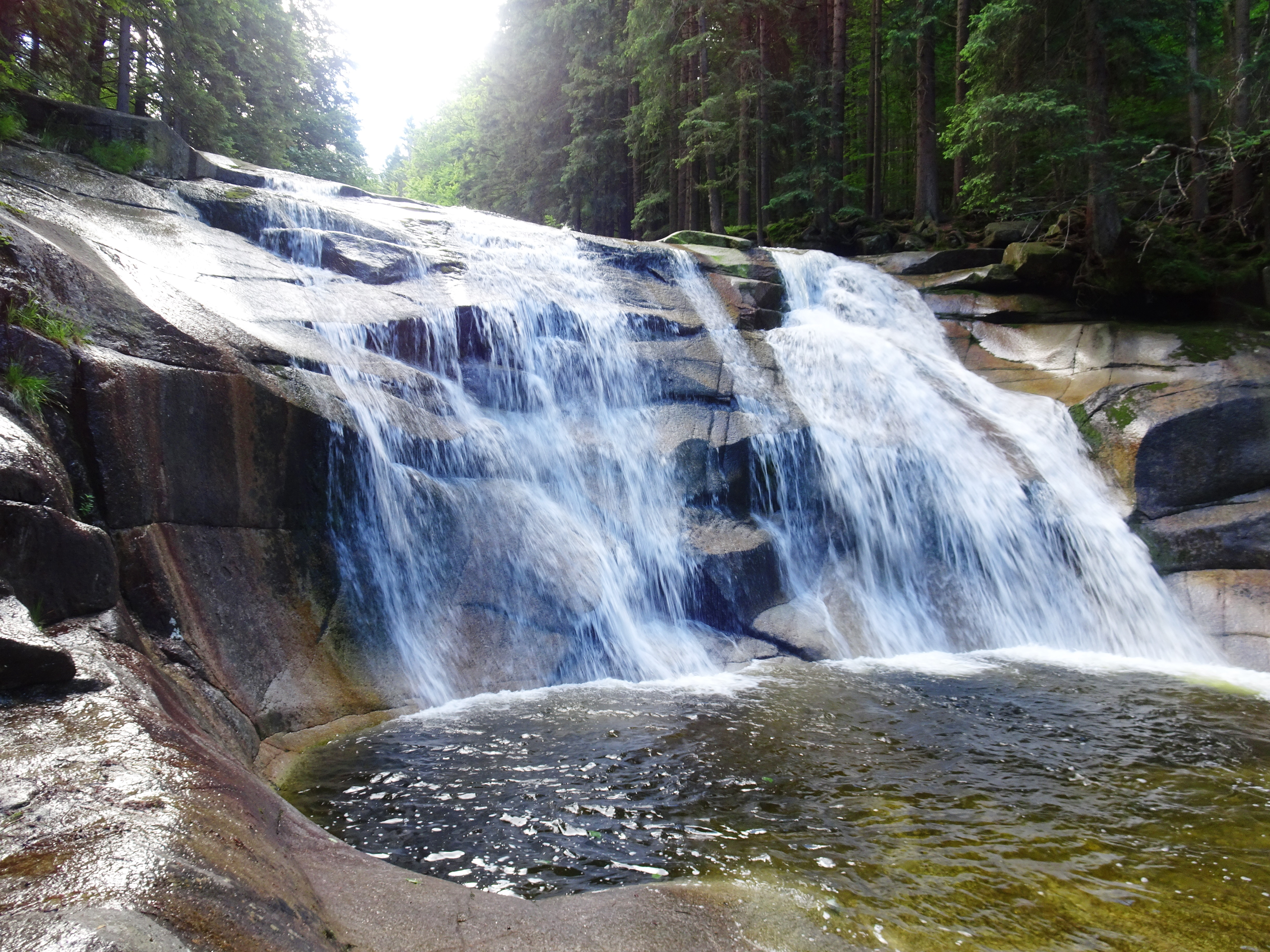
Mumlava Waterfall

The Mumlava originates in the territory of Vítkovice in the Giant Mountains at an elevation of 1,364 m (4,475 ft) and flows to Harrachov, where it enters the Jizera River at an elevation of 570 m (1,870 ft). It is 12.6 km (7.8 mi) long. Its drainage basin has an area of 51.6 km^{2} (19.9 sq mi). The average discharge at its mouth is 1.98 m^{3}/s (70 cu ft/s).

The longest tributaries of the Mumlava are:

Tributary	Length (km)	River km	Side
Milnice / Mielnica	6.8	1.6	right
Ryzí potok	5.2	4.0	left
Bílá voda	4.7	2.8	right

== Course ==
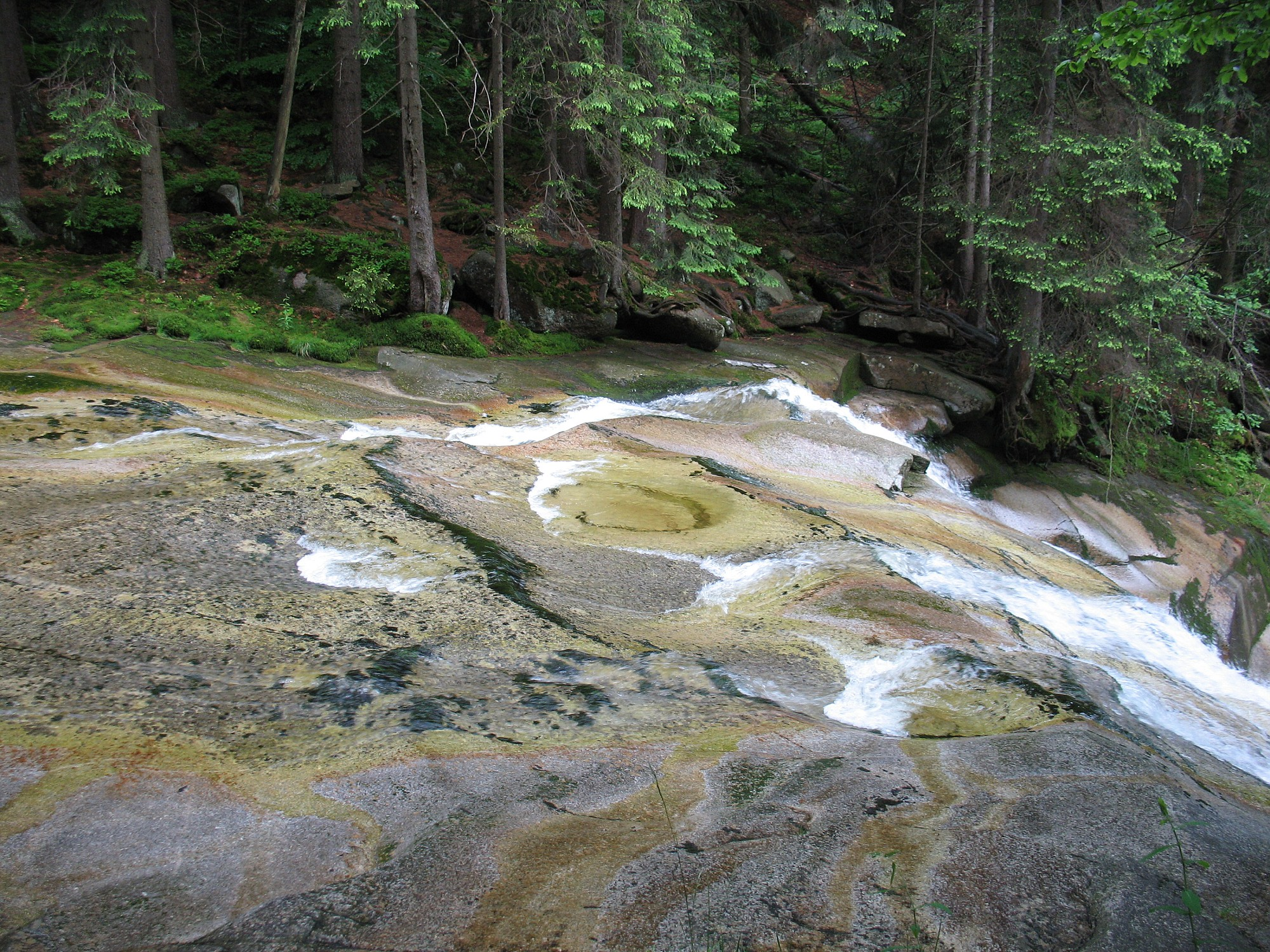
Giant's kettles in the Mumlava

The river flows through the municipal territories of Vítkovice, Rokytnice nad Jizerou and Harrachov. The upper course of the river (until its confluence with the Malá Mumlava Creek) is also called Velká Mumlava.

== Mumlava Waterfall ==
The river is known for the Mumlava Waterfall, which is the biggest and one of the most famous waterfalls in the Czech Republic. It has a flow rate of 800 L/s and a height of 8.9 m (29 ft). The Mumlava Waterfall is a popular tourist destination. It is located close to Harrachov and easy accessibility makes it the most visited waterfall in the country.

The water flow has ground out the so-called giant's kettles in the granite riverbed at the waterfall site. They are up to 2.9 m (9 ft 6 in) deep. In winter, the water stream sometimes freezes and creates an icefall.

== Fauna ==
Only a minimum of animals live in the river. This is a natural condition, not caused by humans.

== Tourism ==
The Mumlava is suitable for river tourism. However, only the last four kilometres are accessible because of the river's location in the Krkonoše National Park, and the river is only suitable for experienced paddlers.

== See also ==
- List of rivers of the Czech Republic
- List of waterfalls
