= Veli-Matti Ahonen =

Finnish ski jumper

Personal information
- Full name: Veli-Matti Ahonen

Sport
- Sport: Skiing

World Cup career
- Seasons: 1984
- Indiv. podiums: 2
- Updated on 30 Mar 2015

Veli-Matti Ahonen is a Finnish former ski jumper.
