= Klaus Ostwald =

East German ski jumper

Personal information
- Nationality: East Germany
- Born: 26 August 1958 (age 67) Bad Elster, East Germany
- Height: 175 cm (5 ft 9 in)

Sport
- Sport: Skiing

World Cup career
- Seasons: 1980; 1982–1986
- Indiv. starts: 42
- Indiv. podiums: 9
- Indiv. wins: 2

Achievements and titles
- Personal bests: 176 m (577 ft); Planica, 16 March 1979
Medal record
Men's ski jumping
Representing East Germany
FIS Nordic World Ski Championships
Silver medal – second place	1984 Engelberg	Team LH
Bronze medal – third place	1985 Seefeld	Team LH
Men's ski flying
FIS Ski Flying World Championships
Gold medal – first place	1983 Harrachov	Individual
- Updated on 10 February 2016

Klaus Ostwald (born 26 August 1958) is an East German former ski jumper.

== Career ==
He won the FIS Ski Flying World Championships 1983 in Harrachov. Ostwald earned two medals in the team large hill at the FIS Nordic World Ski Championships with a silver in 1984 and a bronze in 1985. His best individual finish at the world championships was 4th in the individual large hill in 1982. His best finish at the Winter Olympics was 13th in the normal hill at Sarajevo in 1984. He also had World Cup wins.

On 18 March 1979, at the 5th Ski Flying World Championships, he tied the ski jumping world record distance at 176 metres (577 ft) on Velikanka bratov Gorišek in Planica, Yugoslavia.

== World Cup ==
=== Standings ===
Season	Overall	4H
1979/80	21	4
1981/82	17	12
1982/83	17	10
1983/84	7	2nd place, silver medalist(s)
1984/85	12	3rd place, bronze medalist(s)
1985/86	37	55

=== Wins ===
No.	Season	Date	Location	Hill	Size
1	1981/82	31 January 1982	(Switzerland) Engelberg	Gross-Titlis-Schanze K116	LH
2	1983/84	30 December 1983	(West Germany) Oberstdorf	Schattenbergschanze K115	LH

== Ski jumping world record ==
Date	Hill	Location	Metres	Feet
18 March 1979	Velikanka bratov Gorišek K165	Planica, Yugoslavia	176	577
