= FIS Ski Flying World Championships 1981 =

1981 edition of the FIS Ski-Flying World Championships

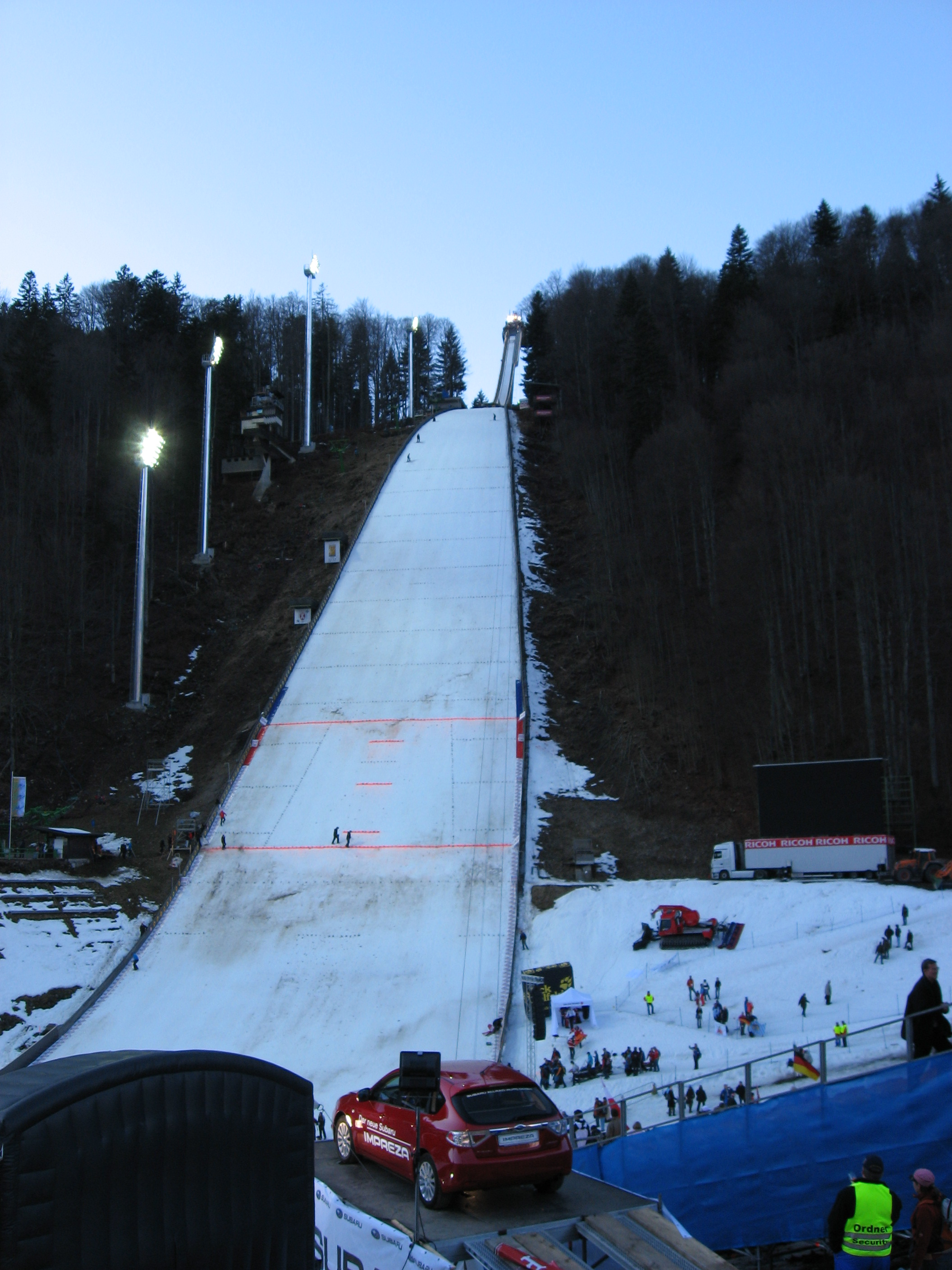

The FIS Ski Flying World Ski Championships 1981 took place in Oberstdorf, West Germany for the second time. Oberstdorf hosted the FIS Ski Flying World Championships in 1973.

== Individual ==
Medal	Athlete	Points
Gold	Jari Puikkonen (FIN)	1201.0
Silver	Armin Kogler (AUT)	1140.5
Bronze	Tom Levorstad (NOR)	1068.0

== Medal table ==
Rank	Nation	Gold	Silver	Bronze	Total
1	Finland (FIN)	1	0	0	1
2	Austria (AUT)	0	1	0	1
3	Norway (NOR)	0	0	1	1
Totals (3 entries)		1	1	1	3
