= Vítkov (disambiguation) =

Vítkov is a town in the Moravian-Silesian Region in the Czech Republic:

Vítkov may also refer to places in the Czech Republic:

- Vítkov, a village and part of Česká Lípa in the Liberec Region
- Vítkov, a village and part of Sokolov in the Karlovy Vary Region
- Vítkov, a village and part of Štěkeň in the South Bohemian Region
- Vítkov, a village and part of Tachov in the Plzeň Region
- Vítkov, a hill in Prague, site of the Battle of Vítkov Hill

== See also ==
- Vítkovice (disambiguation)
