= Vegard Opaas =

Norwegian former ski jumper (born 1962)

Personal information
- Nationality: Norway
- Born: 11 January 1962 (age 64) Oslo, Norway
- Height: 175 cm (5 ft 9 in)

Sport
- Sport: Skiing

World Cup career
- Seasons: 1982–1990
- Indiv. starts: 92
- Indiv. podiums: 17
- Indiv. wins: 7
- Overall titles: 1 (1987)

Achievements and titles
- Personal bests: 193 m (633 ft); Planica, 15 March 1987
Medal record
Men's ski jumping
World Championships
Silver medal – second place	1987 Oberstdorf	Individual LH
Silver medal – second place	1987 Oberstdorf	Team LH
Bronze medal – third place	1987 Oberstdorf	Individual NH
- Updated on 10 February 2016

Vegard Opaas (born 11 January 1962) is a Norwegian former ski jumper.

== Career ==
On 15 March 1987 in Planica he jumped 193 metres (633 ft) in the third round, which was canceled right after. At that time this was the second longest jump in history.

He had his biggest season in 1987 when he became the first Norwegian ski jumper to win the overall World Cup, a feat later only matched by Espen Bredesen in 1993/94, and Anders Bardal in 2011/12.

That same year he won three medals at the world championships in Oberstdorf. This included two silvers (individual large hill, team large hill) and one bronze (individual normal hill). He also finished eighth in the normal hill event at the 1984 Winter Olympics in Sarajevo he also participated in the 1988 Winter Olympics in Calgary, Alberta, Canada.

He represented the sports club Grorud IL.

== World Cup ==
=== Standings ===
Season	Overall	4H
1981/82	40	—
1982/83	32	—
1983/84	10	45
1984/85	30	—
1985/86	7	5
1986/87	1st place, gold medalist(s)	2nd place, silver medalist(s)
1987/88	12	27
1988/89	15	21
1989/90	41	43

=== Wins ===
No.	Season	Date	Location	Hill	Size
1	1983/84	6 December 1983	(Canada) Thunder Bay	Big Thunder K120	LH
2	1985/86	14 December 1985	(United States) Lake Placid	MacKenzie Intervale K114	LH
3	1986/87	13 December 1986	(United States) Lake Placid	MacKenzie Intervale K114	LH
4	1986/87	30 December 1986	(West Germany) Oberstdorf	Schattenbergschanze K115	LH
5	1986/87	11 January 1987	(Czechoslovakia) Štrbské Pleso	MS 1970 B K88	NH
6	1986/87	20 March 1987	(Norway) Oslo	Marikollen K85	NH
7	1988/89	11 December 1988	(United States) Lake Placid	MacKenzie Intervale K86	NH
