= Adolf Hirner =

Austrian former ski jumper (born 1965)

Personal information
- Full name: Adolf Hirner
- Born: 3 May 1965 (age 61)

Sport
- Sport: Skiing

World Cup career
- Seasons: 1982–1988
- Indiv. podiums: 1
- Updated on 30 Mar 2015

Adolf Hirner (born 3 May 1965) is an Austrian former ski jumper.
