= Vítkovice (Semily District) =

- Municipality
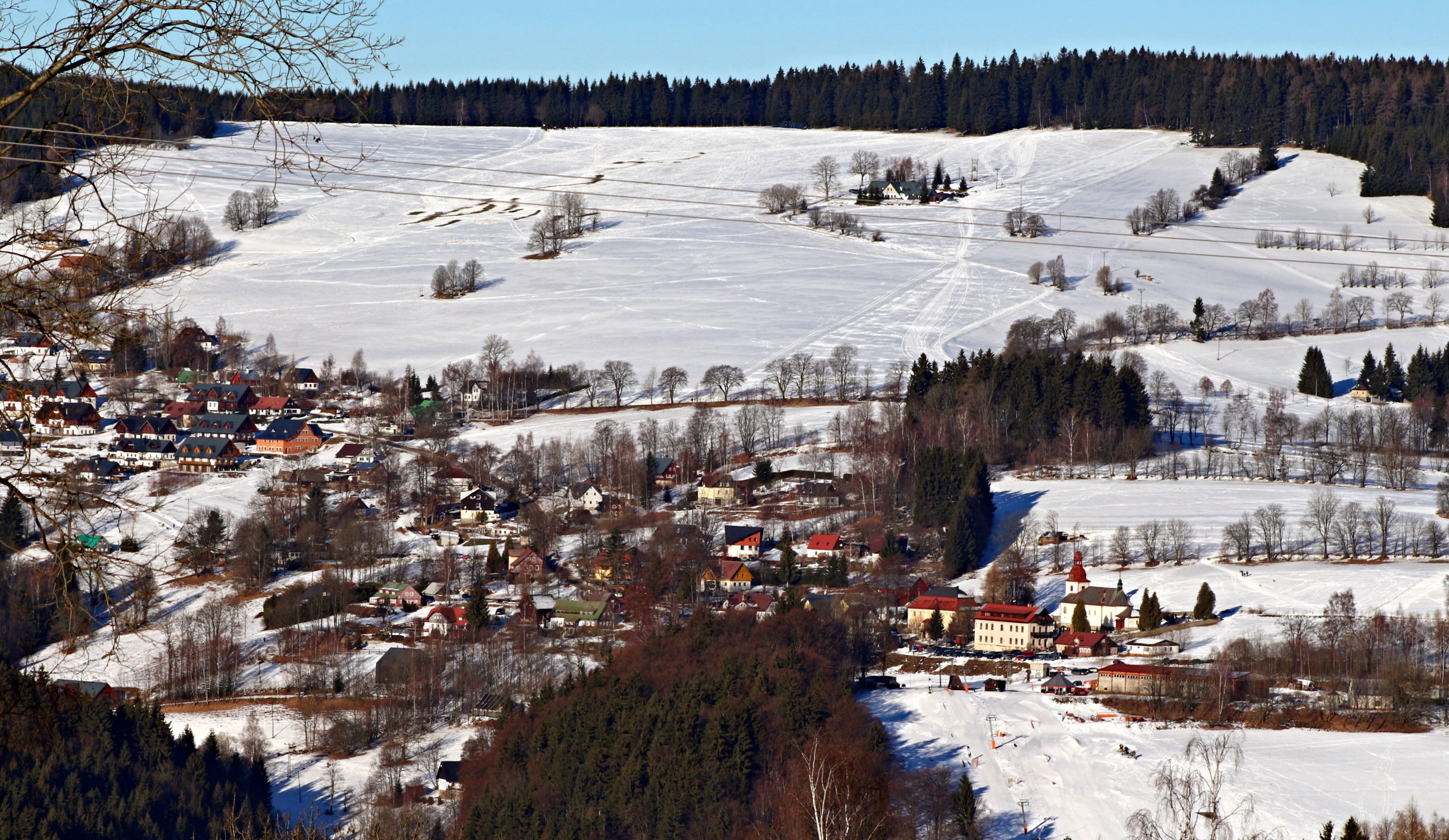
- Vítkovice seen from Benecko

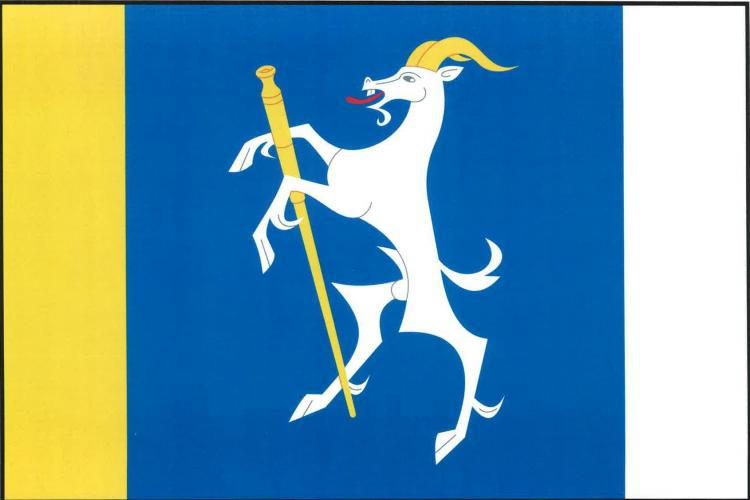
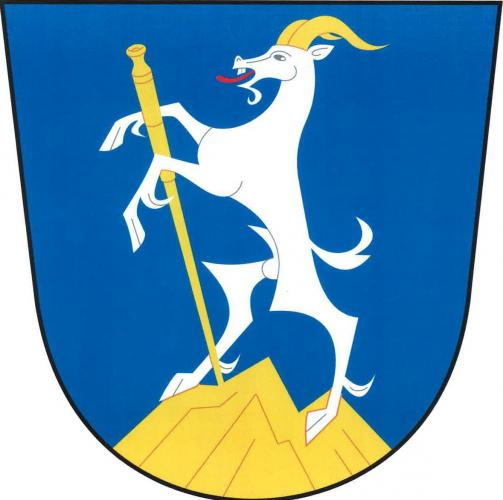
- Flag Coat of arms

- Location in the Czech Republic
- Coordinates: 50°40′45″N 15°31′53″E
- Country: Czech Republic
- Region: Liberec
- District: Semily
- First mentioned: 1606

Area
  - Total: 31.94 km^{2} (12.33 sq mi)
- Elevation: 683 m (2,241 ft)

Population (2026-01-01)
  - Total: 366
  - Density: 11.5/km^{2} (29.7/sq mi)
- Time zone: UTC+1 (CET)
  - Summer (DST): UTC+2 (CEST)
- Postal code: 512 38
- Website: www.vitkovicevkrk.cz

Vítkovice (German: Witkowitz) is a municipality and village in Semily District in the Liberec Region of the Czech Republic. It has about 400 inhabitants. The Mumlava River originates in the northern part of the municipality.

== Demographics ==
Historical population
Year	Pop.	±%
1869	2,125	—
1880	2,008	−5.5%
1890	1,798	−10.5%
1900	1,753	−2.5%
1910	1,606	−8.4%
1921	1,423	−11.4%
1930	1,290	−9.3%
1950	805	−37.6%
1961	366	−54.5%
1970	302	−17.5%
1980	337	+11.6%
1991	392	+16.3%
2001	392	+0.0%
2011	443	+13.0%
2021	345	−22.1%
Source: Censuses
