= Tom Levorstad =

Norwegian ski jumper (born 1957)

Medal record

Men's ski flying

World Championships
Bronze medal – third place	1981 Oberstdorf	Ski-flying hill

Tom Levorstad (born 5 July 1957) is a Norwegian former ski jumper who competed from 1980 to 1982. He won a bronze medal at the FIS Ski Flying World Championships 1981 in Oberstdorf.

Levorstad's best World Cup finish was third in an individual large hill event in France in 1980.
