= FIS Ski Flying World Championships 1983 =

1983 edition of the FIS Ski-Flying World Championships

The FIS Ski Flying World Ski Championships 1983 took place at Čerťák in Harrachov, Czechoslovakia on 1 January 1983.

== Individual ==
Medal	Athlete	Points
Gold	Klaus Ostwald (GDR)	1051.0
Silver	Pavel Ploc (TCH)	1045.5
Bronze	Matti Nykänen (FIN)	1043.5

== Medal table ==
Rank	Nation	Gold	Silver	Bronze	Total
1	East Germany (GDR)	1	0	0	1
2	Czechoslovakia (TCH)	0	1	0	1
3	Finland (FIN)	0	0	1	1
Totals (3 entries)		1	1	1	3
