= Harrachov =

- Town
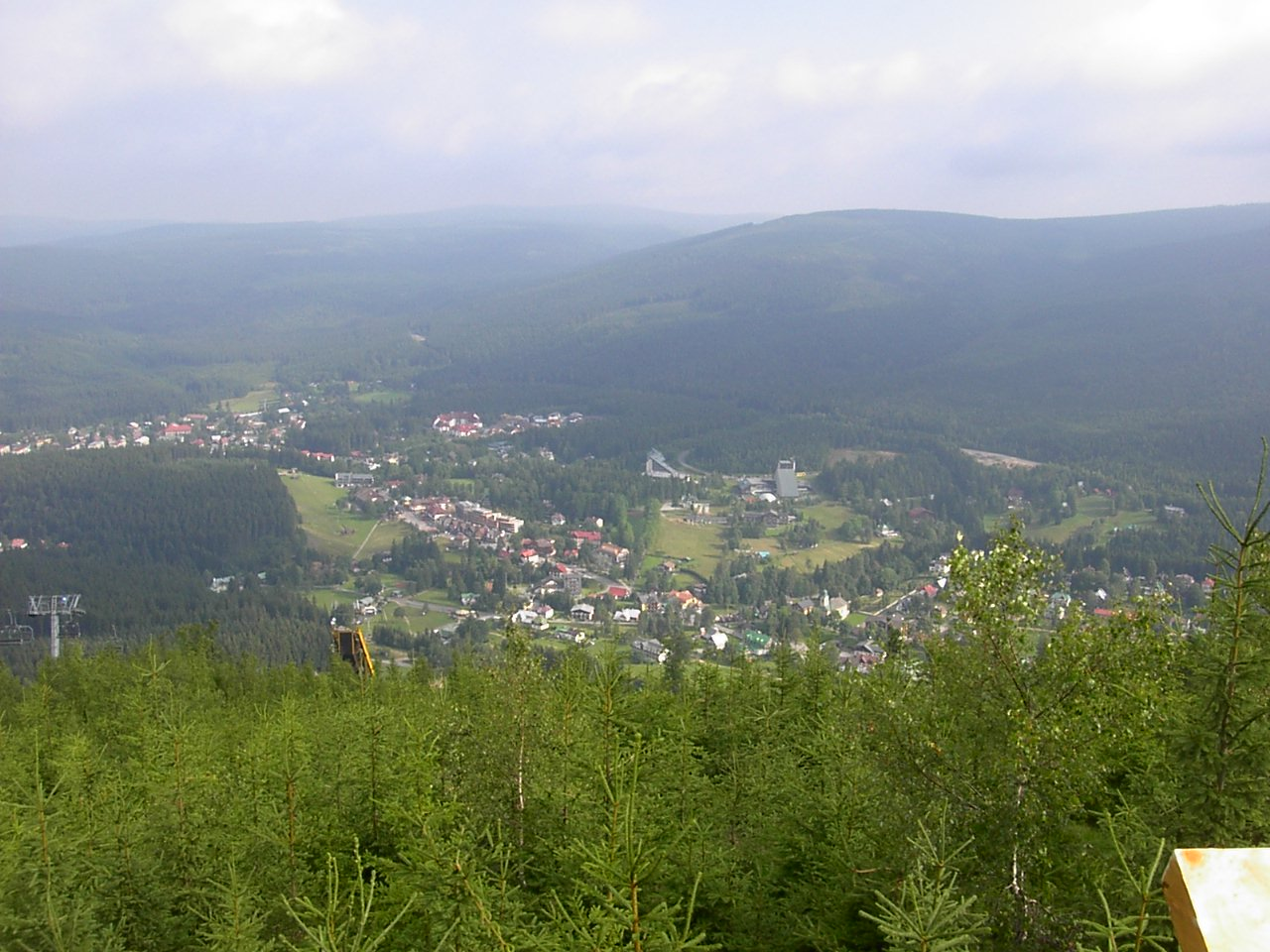
- Panoramic view

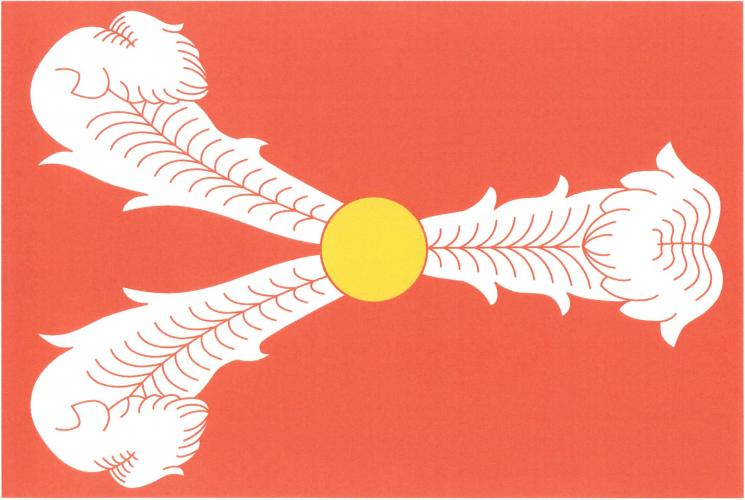
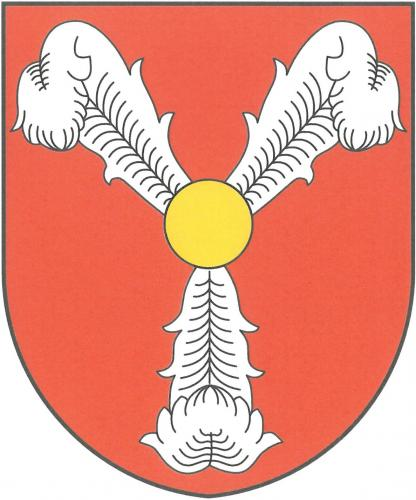
- Flag Coat of arms

- Location in the Czech Republic
- Coordinates: 50°46′23″N 15°25′44″E
- Country: Czech Republic
- Region: Liberec
- District: Jablonec nad Nisou
- First mentioned: 1720

Government
  - Mayor: Tomáš Vašíček

Area
  - Total: 36.63 km^{2} (14.14 sq mi)
- Elevation: 665 m (2,182 ft)

Population (2026-01-01)
  - Total: 1,361
  - Density: 37.16/km^{2} (96.23/sq mi)
- Time zone: UTC+1 (CET)
  - Summer (DST): UTC+2 (CEST)
- Postal code: 512 46
- Website: www.harrachov.cz

Harrachov (Czech pronunciation: [ˈɦaraxof]; German: Harrachsdorf) is a town in Jablonec nad Nisou District in the Liberec Region of the Czech Republic. It has about 1,400 inhabitants. The town is located on the Mumlava River in the Giant Mountains, on the border with Poland. It is one of the most popular Czech ski resorts.

Harrachov was founded as a village of glassmakers. The glass factory, founded in 1712, is one of the longest-running glassworks in Bohemia, and its grinding plant is protected as a national cultural monument.

== Administrative division ==
Harrachov consists of four municipal parts (in brackets population according to the 2021 census):

- Harrachov (503)
- Mýtiny (16)
- Nový Svět (788)
- Ryžoviště (39)

== Etymology ==
Harrachov was initially called Dörf (German for 'little village'). During the rule of Count Ferdinand Bonaventura Harrach (1701–1706), the settlement was renamed Harrachsdorf ("Harrach's village") in his honour.

== Geography ==
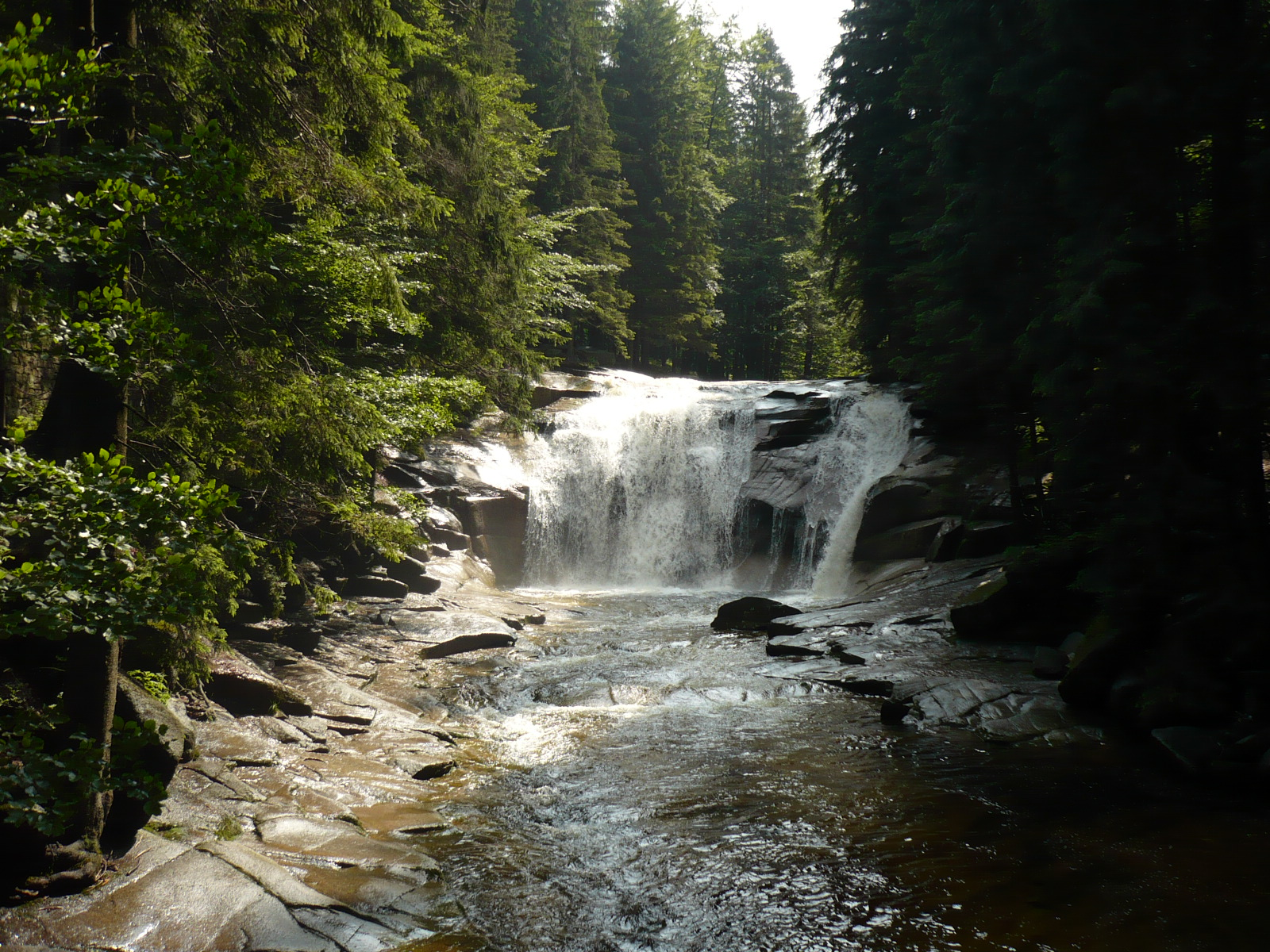
Mumlava Waterfall

Harrachov is located about 18 kilometres (11 mi) east of Jablonec nad Nisou, on the border with Poland. It lies in the Giant Mountains. The highest point is the mountain Luboch at 1,296 m (4,252 ft) above sea level. Part of the municipal territory belongs to Krkonoše National Park.

The Mumlava River flows through the town. Its confluence with the Jizera is situated on the municipal border. On the Mumlava in the territory of Harrachov is the Mumlava Waterfall, the biggest and one of the most famous waterfalls in the Czech Republic. It has a flow rate of 800 L/s and a height of 8.9 m (29 ft).

=== Climate ===
Climate data for Harrachov, 1991–2020 normals, extremes 1961–present
Month	Jan	Feb	Mar	Apr	May	Jun	Jul	Aug	Sep	Oct	Nov	Dec	Year
Record high °C (°F)	10.9 (51.6)	14.9 (58.8)	20.0 (68.0)	27.0 (80.6)	28.6 (83.5)	32.7 (90.9)	33.6 (92.5)	34.1 (93.4)	31.0 (87.8)	23.7 (74.7)	17.5 (63.5)	11.4 (52.5)	34.1 (93.4)
Mean daily maximum °C (°F)	0.4 (32.7)	1.8 (35.2)	5.5 (41.9)	11.8 (53.2)	16.6 (61.9)	19.6 (67.3)	21.6 (70.9)	21.6 (70.9)	16.5 (61.7)	11.1 (52.0)	5.2 (41.4)	0.8 (33.4)	11.0 (51.8)
Daily mean °C (°F)	−2.9 (26.8)	−2.0 (28.4)	0.7 (33.3)	5.6 (42.1)	10.8 (51.4)	14.1 (57.4)	15.8 (60.4)	15.2 (59.4)	10.8 (51.4)	6.6 (43.9)	2.1 (35.8)	−2.0 (28.4)	6.2 (43.2)
Mean daily minimum °C (°F)	−5.8 (21.6)	−5.4 (22.3)	−3.0 (26.6)	0.6 (33.1)	5.3 (41.5)	8.7 (47.7)	10.5 (50.9)	10.0 (50.0)	6.5 (43.7)	3.1 (37.6)	−0.6 (30.9)	−4.5 (23.9)	2.1 (35.8)
Record low °C (°F)	−27.7 (−17.9)	−24.0 (−11.2)	−23.0 (−9.4)	−13.9 (7.0)	−6.0 (21.2)	−3.5 (25.7)	0.2 (32.4)	−0.5 (31.1)	−5.0 (23.0)	−10.1 (13.8)	−18.6 (−1.5)	−23.0 (−9.4)	−27.7 (−17.9)
Average precipitation mm (inches)	128.4 (5.06)	104.9 (4.13)	109.0 (4.29)	60.1 (2.37)	88.7 (3.49)	109.0 (4.29)	129.0 (5.08)	115.2 (4.54)	97.5 (3.84)	97.7 (3.85)	101.0 (3.98)	133.0 (5.24)	1,273.2 (50.13)
Average snowfall cm (inches)	85.2 (33.5)	77.7 (30.6)	59.2 (23.3)	15.5 (6.1)	1.0 (0.4)	0.0 (0.0)	0.0 (0.0)	0.0 (0.0)	0.2 (0.1)	6.3 (2.5)	39.9 (15.7)	84.8 (33.4)	369.8 (145.6)
Average relative humidity (%)	88.6	85.4	82.9	77.2	76.2	77.6	78.5	80.2	84.5	86.3	89.8	90.6	83.1
Mean monthly sunshine hours	38.5	62.1	115.3	170.0	173.0	187.1	203.0	197.1	147.0	97.2	49.8	36.5	1,476.5
Source: Czech Hydrometeorological Institute

== History ==
Harrachov (initially called Dörf) was established in the 17th century, after a glassworks was founded in the area of Ryžoviště. It belonged to the Jilemnice estate, owned by the Hrarrach family. The first written mention of Harrachov is from 1720. After a glassworks was founded also in the area of Nový Svět in 1711, the importance of Harrachov grew. The settlements of Nový Svět and Ryžoviště were founded around the glassworks in the mid-18th century.

Since the end of the 19th century, Harrachov has been known for its glass production, textile industry and mining. At the beginning of the 20th century, industrial production was bolstered by the construction of a cog railway line between Tanvald via the Izera railway down to Silesian Hirschberg (present-day Jelenia Góra).

After World War II, the Silesian lands in the north fell to the Polish People's Republic according to the Potsdam Agreement and the border was closed. The German population was expelled and its property seized according to the Beneš decrees.

In 1958, the Communist governments of Czechoslovakia and Poland arranged a territorial exchange. Since the railway station located here was unusable for Poland after the interruption of cross-border traffic (the line to Jelenia Góra returned to Czechoslovak territory in a short section) and the local small settlements were almost inaccessible from the Polish side, the territories was exchanged. Czechoslovakia acquired the area around former Strickerhäuser (Polish: Tkacze, present-day Mýtiny). Poland was compensated by land in western Giant Mountains. In this way Harrachov acquired a railway station.

In 1921, the originally independent municipalities of Nový Svět and Rýžoviště joined Harrachov. In 1961, Mýtiny joined Harrachov.

From 1 January 2021, Harrachov is no longer a part of Semily District and belongs to Jablonec nad Nisou District.

== Demographics ==
Historical population

Year	Pop.	±%
1869	1,788	—
1880	1,945	+8.8%
1890	1,750	−10.0%
1900	1,762	+0.7%
1910	1,656	−6.0%

Year	Pop.	±%
1921	1,410	−14.9%
1930	1,731	+22.8%
1950	2,013	+16.3%
1961	1,282	−36.3%
1970	1,249	−2.6%

Year	Pop.	±%
1980	1,428	+14.3%
1991	1,667	+16.7%
2001	1,757	+5.4%
2011	1,643	−6.5%
2021	1,346	−18.1%

Source: Censuses

== Transport ==
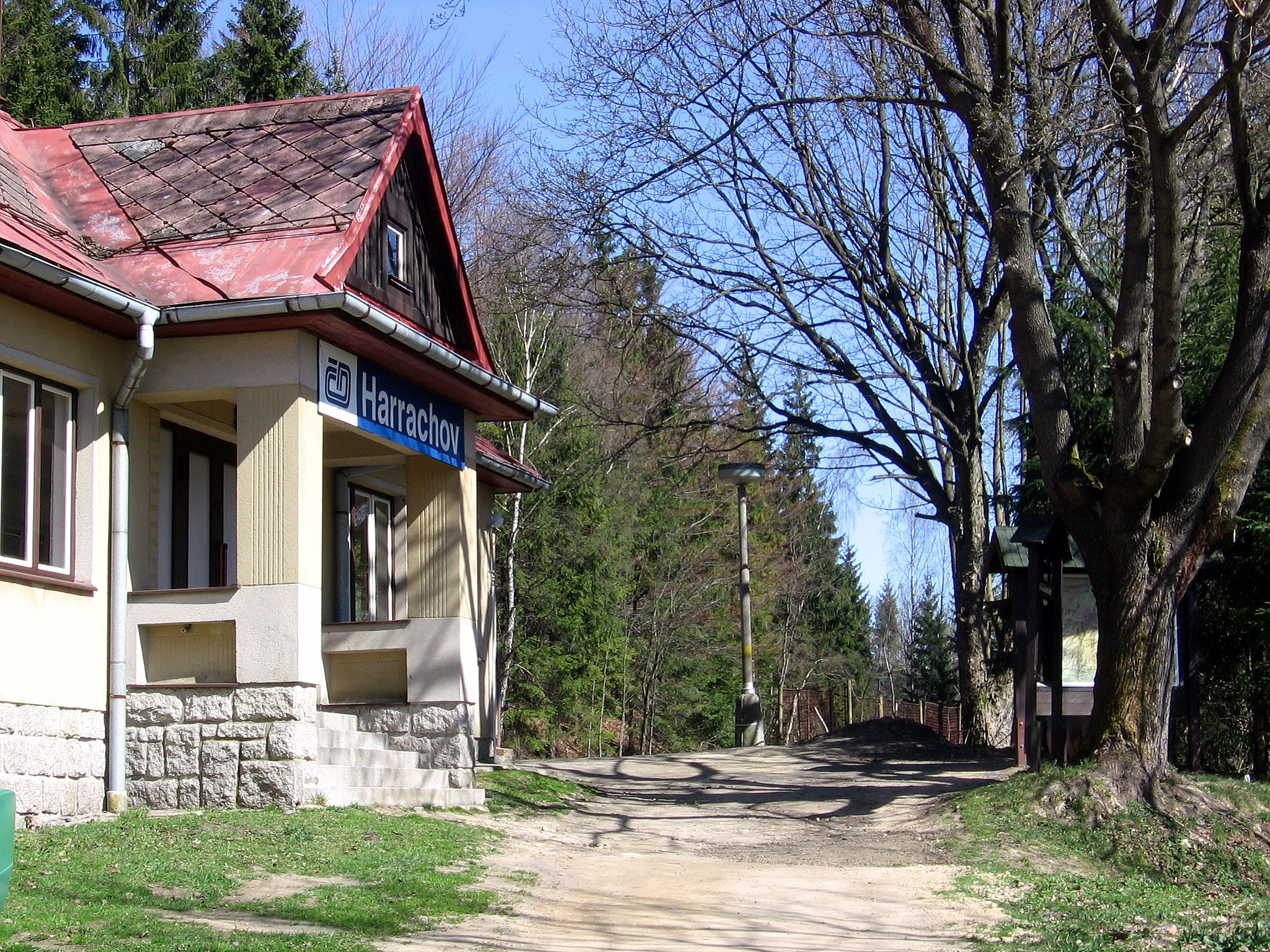
Harrachov-Mýtiny train station

The I/10 road (part of the European route E65 from Prague) runs through the town.

Harrachov is located on the railway line from Liberec to Szklarska Poręba.

There are three borders crossings with Poland: the railway crossing Harrachov / Jakuszyce, the road border crossing Harrachov / Jakuszyce, and the pedestrian border crossing Harrachov / Polana Jakuszycka.

== Sport ==
Harrachov is one of the most popular Czech ski resorts including the internationally used Čerťák ski jumping hill (including flying hill); several winter sport events take place in Harrachov regularly. The whole region is increasingly important for alpine tourism in Central Europe.

== Sights ==
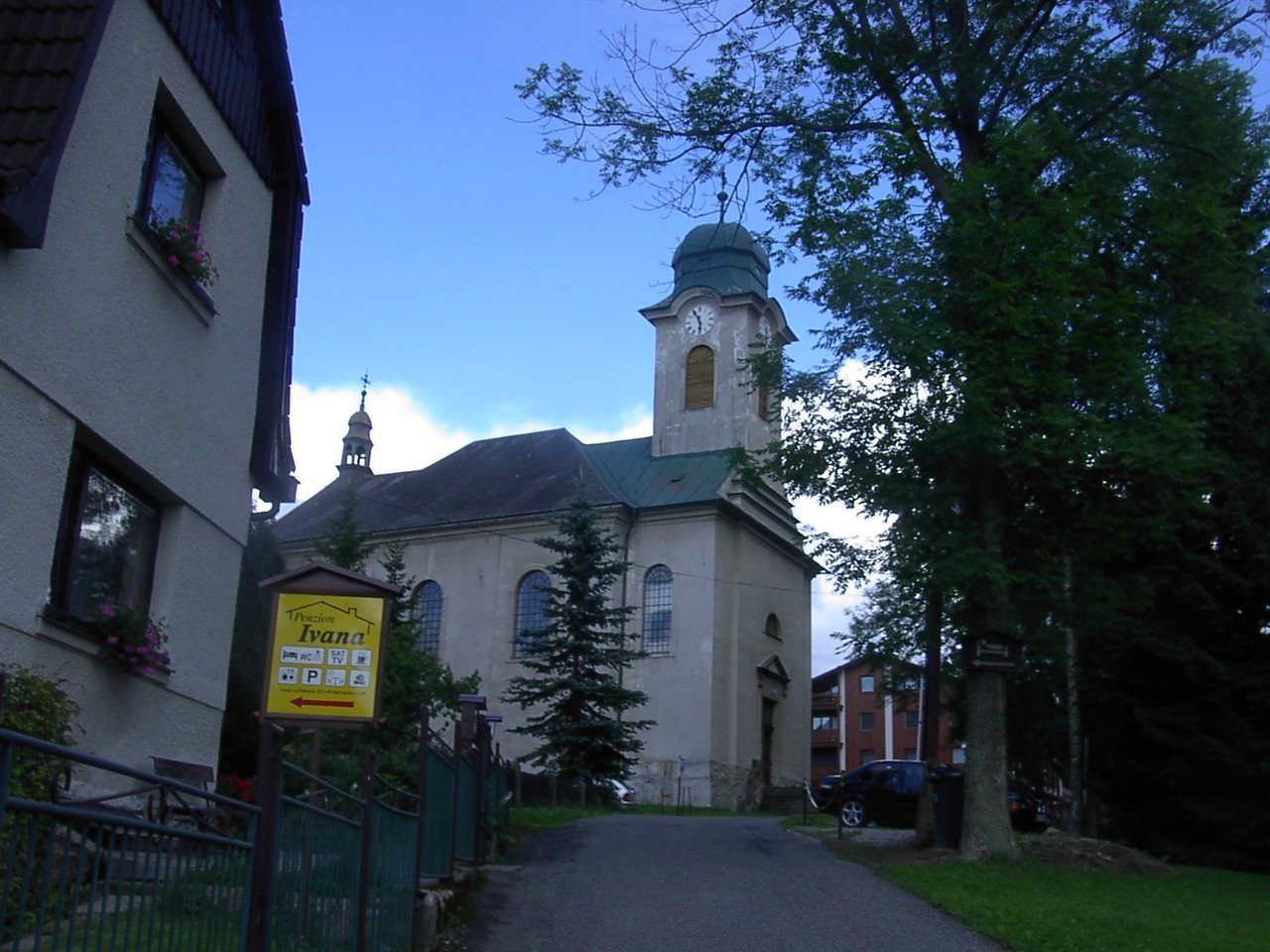
Church of Saint Wenceslaus

The most valuable building is the glass factory, founded in 1712. It is one of the longest-running glassworks in Bohemia that still uses most of the uniquely preserved historical machinery, which makes it an important technical monument. Its best-preserved part is the grinding plant, which is protected as a national cultural monument.

The main landmark of Harrachov is the Church of Saint Wenceslaus. It was built in the Neoclassical style in 1822–1828, on the site of a chapel from 1730 and a wooden church from 1788. The local glass factory took part in the decoration. The interior is equipped with a glass altar.

== Twin towns – sister cities ==
Harrachov is twinned with:

- Frenštát pod Radhoštěm, Czech Republic
