= 1982–83 Four Hills Tournament =

Ski jumping competition

The 1982-83 Four Hills Tournament took place at the four traditional venues of Oberstdorf, Garmisch-Partenkirchen, Innsbruck and Bischofshofen, located in Germany and Austria, between 30 December 1982 and 6 January 1983.

== Results ==
Date	Place	Hill	Size	Winner	Second	Third	Ref.
30 Dec 1982	(West Germany) Oberstdorf	Schattenbergschanze K-110	LH	(Canada) Horst Bulau	(Finland) Matti Nykänen	(Austria) Armin Kogler	
1 Jan 1983	(West Germany) Garmisch-Partenkirchen	Große Olympiaschanze K-107	LH	(Austria) Armin Kogler	(Norway) Steinar Bråten	(East Germany) Jens Weißflog	
4 Jan 1983	(Austria) Innsbruck	Bergiselschanze K-104	LH	(Finland) Matti Nykänen	(East Germany) Jens Weißflog	(Canada) Horst Bulau	
6 Jan 1983	(Austria) Bischofshofen	Paul-Ausserleitner-Schanze K-109	LH	(East Germany) Jens Weißflog	(Norway) Olav Hansson	(Austria) Richard Schallert	

== Overall ==
Pos	Ski Jumper	Points
1	(Finland) Matti Nykänen	989.8
2	(East Germany) Jens Weißflog	972.2
3	(Canada) Horst Bulau	960.9
4	(Norway) Per Bergerud	959.5
5	(Norway) Steinar Bråten	955.1
6	(Austria) Richard Schallert	954.6
7	(Finland) Pentti Kokkonen	952.1
8	(Norway) Olav Hansson	945.9
9	(Norway) Ole Bremseth	936.8
10	(East Germany) Klaus Ostwald	929.1
