= Vikersundbakken =

Ski flying hill in Norway

Coordinates: 59°56′18″N 10°00′22″E

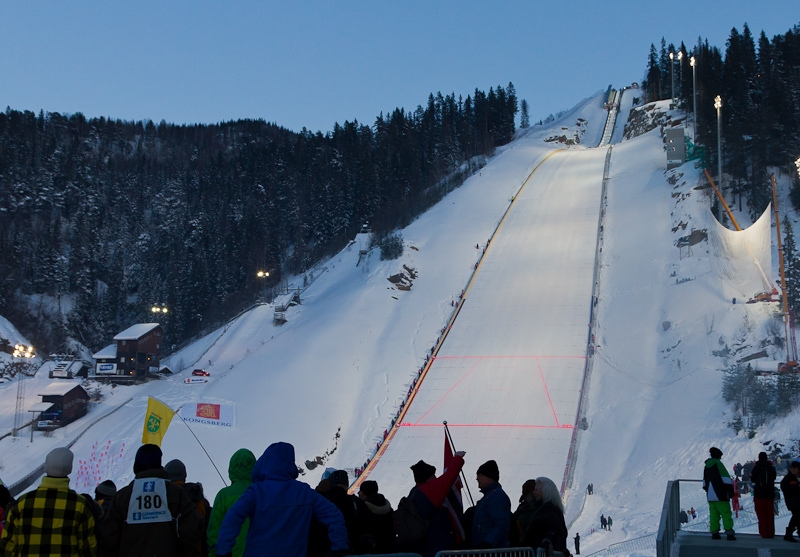
- Location: Vikersund, Norway
- Opened: 29 Jan 1936 (LH test); 16 Feb 1936 (LH official); 12 Mar 1966 (FH conver.)
- Renovated: 1956, 1966, 1977, 1990, 2000, 2011

Size
- K–point: 200 m
- Hill size: 240 m
- Longest jump (unofficial / fall): 254 m (833 ft)* (Russia) Dimitry Vassiliev (15 February 2015)
- Hill record: 253.5 m (831.7 ft) (Austria) Stefan Kraft (18 March 2017)

Top events
- Ski Flying World Championships: 1977, 1990, 2000, 2012, 2022

Vikersundbakken or Vikersund Hill is a ski flying hill at Vikersund in Modum, Norway. It is one of the two largest purpose-built ski flying hills in the world. Nine world records have been set there. The complex consists of a large hill, a normal hill and several training hills.

The hill originally constructed by Kristian Hovde was opened in 1936 as a large hill. It was rebuilt as ski flying hill in 1964, and was modified in 1989, 1999 and 2010. The present large hill was built in 1988. Vikersundbakken was the first ski flying hill to receive floodlights in 2006. It has hosted the FIS Ski Flying World Championships in 1977, 1990, 2000, 2012 and 2022.

== History ==
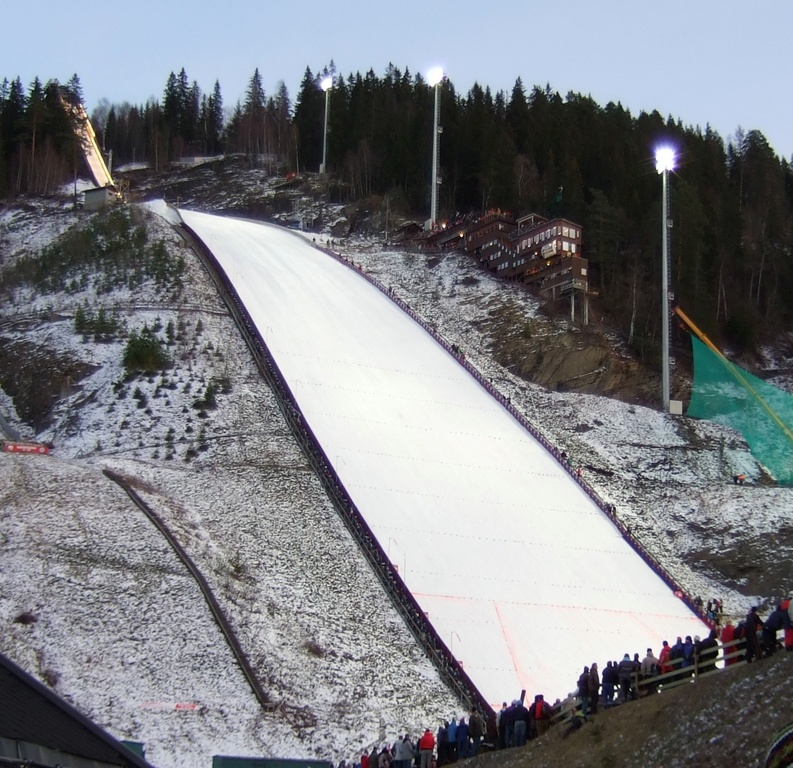

In 1894, Vikersund SK was established and started with ski jumping. Until the 1930s, they used six different ski jumping hills around the area. By then, the club had fostered sufficiently good jumpers that it was proposed to build a proper hill. A committee was established on 19 March 1935 and led by Gustav N. Hovde. At first they found a suitable location north of Heggen. However, they failed to reach an agreement with the land owner. Instead, Hovde proposed using the steep hill close to Heggen Church. After purchasing the land, construction started later in 1935. The original hill was designed by Thunold Hansen. Construction cost 6,290 Norwegian krone (NOK), of which NOK 1000 was borrowed and the rest of financed through private donations.

The first hill had a length from the top of the in-run to the bottom of the out-run of 425 meters (1,394 ft) and an elevation difference of 130 meters (430 ft). The in-run was 115 meters (377 ft) long and had an elevation difference of 46 meters (151 ft). The hill was inaugurated on 29 January 1936 with a 50-meter jump by Birger Henriksen. The longest jump on the opening day was made by Reidar Andersen, who jumped 86 meters. At the most he was 10 to 12 meters (33 to 39 ft) above the landing slope, so the take-off was lowered 40 centimeters (16 in) from 6 to 11 degrees.

The main logistical issue with the events was the poor transport service, with only a narrow road to the hill. During the 1950s, the attendance rose well beyond the former 5,000, forcing the road to be upgraded in 1955. By the 1950s, ski jumps were being built larger and in 1954, Kristian Hovde proposed to expand Vikersundbakken, which he hoped would allow jumps of 100 meters (330 ft). The plans were passed by the club's annual meeting on 13 September, with construction starting in the summer of 1955. The lower part of the landing slope was dug down 1.75 meters (5 ft 9 in), the in-run was raised up to 85 centimeters (33 in) and a new jury tower and stairway was built. Additional expansion was passed on 27 April 1956: a 12-meter (39 ft) tall scaffolding in-run was built on top of the old in-run. The hill was designed by Carl Borgen. Contractors were Brødrene Teigen and since the club did not have sufficient funds, they were willing to wait with the payment until they had. The new hill was inaugurated on 10 March 1956.

The new hill was too large to be regarded as a large hill, but was not large enough to be categorized as a ski flying hill. In 1964, the club appointed a committee led by Ottar Grøtterud to consider an expansion of the hill. There was only to be built one ski flying hill in the Nordic Countries, with the main alternative being Renabakken in Rena. Construction cost NOK 445,000 and was in part financed with a NOK 75,000 grant and NOK 150,000 loan from Modum Municipality, NOK 20,000 from volunteer work, NOK 80,000 from the club, grants from companies and banks and from Buskerud County Municipality, and NOK 100,000 in betting funds. Construction was done by Entreprenør Gunnar Sterkebye. The hill received a new 23-meter (75 ft) tall in-run and a new jury tower 70 meters (230 ft) form the jump. On the landing slope and out-run, 200,000 cubic meters (7,100,000 cu ft) of earthwork had to be moved. Work was made more difficult because of high snowfall and temperatures down to −28 °C (−18 °F). The hill was inaugurated on 13 March 1966.

The next upgrade of the venue were minor upgrades ahead of the 1977 World Championships. Ahead of the 1990 World Championships, the venue was again renovated. However, to secure better recruitment, the venue also received a new normal hill with a K point of K-90.

The hill was rebuilt for the 2012 Ski Flying World Championships. It was the first in the world with a hill size of 225 meters, making Vikersundbakken the largest ski flying hill in the world at the time. It has been built further into the terrain with sidewalls made of natural gravel to avoid wind problems during competitions. Furthermore, it has been slanted slightly to the south from the inrun area to further reduce wind problems. The hill was ready for the 2011 Trial Ski Flying World Championships held on 11–13 February 2011.

The old inrun was demolished in 2010. The engineers of the new and larger hill were Slovenians Janez Gorišek and his son Sebastjan. Janez, together with his brother Lado, is most famous for creating Letalnica Bratov Gorišek in Planica, previously the largest hill in the world at HS 215, before Vikersundbakken was reprofiled and enlarged in 2011. Janez is usually named as the 'father' of modern ski flying and is also known as an expert on ski flying hills.

At the trial ski flying championship, Johan Remen Evensen jumped 243 meters to set a new world record during the first official training on 11 February 2011. Later, during qualification, Evensen improved the world record to 246.5 meters.

During autumn 2011 the hill was further improved with a different radius at HS 225, increasing the ability to stand on greater lengths. Additionally the jump itself was cut a meter short because of decreased inrun speed needed by the jumpers. During the 2011 event, it was deemed necessary to add several inrun gates the hill below gate 1 due to better conditions not anticipated by the organisers during construction in 2010. A total of five gates were added. Gregor Schlierenzauer praised the hill during interviews, calling it the best hill in the world. Evensen was also extremely satisfied with the hill, calling it "perfect". The K point was increased from K-195 in 2012 to K-200 in time for the 2015 event, resulting in two new world records on the same weekend: Peter Prevc jumped 250 m (820 ft) and became to first to ever surpass the 250 m mark, and this was followed by Anders Fannemel with 251.5 m (825 ft) the next day. In a training round prior to Fannemel's jump, Dimitry Vassiliev jumped 254 m (833 ft) but fell hard upon landing, rendered his jump invalid as a world record.

== Events ==
Opened as large hill in 1936 and converted into flying hill in 1966.

| Date | Hillsize | Competition | Winner | Second | Third |
|---|---|---|---|---|---|
LARGE HILL (original)
| 16 February 1936 | | OP | (Norway) Hilmar Myhra | | |
| 1937 | | VIKC | (Norway) Reidar Andersen | | |
| 1938 | | VIKC | | | |
| 1939 | | VIKC | | | |
| 1940 | | VIKC | (Norway) Reidar Andersen | | |
| 17 February 1946 | | VIKC | (Norway) Arnholdt Kongsgård | (Norway) Reidar Andersen | (Norway) Vidar Lindboe-Hansen |
| 9 March 1947 | | VIKC | (Norway) Thorleif Schjelderup | (Norway) Svein Haakonsen | (Norway) Hans Kaarstein |
| 14 March 1948 | | VIKC | (Norway) Arnholdt Kongsgård | (Norway) Ivar Nilsen | (Norway) Christian Mohn |
| 1949 | | VIKC | cancelled | | |
| 19 March 1950 | | VIKC | (Norway) Hans Bjørnstad | (Norway) Ivar Nilsen | (Norway) Birger Arnesen |
| 18 February 1951 | | VIKC | (Norway) Kjell Knarvik | (Norway) Arne Hoel | (Norway) Reidar Andersen |
| 2 March 1952 | | VIKC | (Norway) Arnfinn Bergmann | (Norway) Arne Hoel | (Norway) Svein Lien |
| 8 March 1953 | | VIKC | (Norway) Georg Thrane | (Norway) Per Thyness | (Norway) Thorleif Schjelderup |
| 28 February 1954 | | VIKC | (Norway) Asgeir Dølplads | | |
| 3 April 1954 | | NRA | | | |
| 13 March 1955 | | VIKC | wind; rescheduled to 26 March | | |
| 26 March 1955 | | VIKC | (Norway) Arnfinn Karlstad | (Norway) Simon Slåttvik | (Norway) Erling Kroken |
| 4 March 1956 | | VIKC | (Norway) Asbjørn Osnes | | |
| 10 March 1957 | | VIKC | (Norway) Arne Hoel | (Norway) Simon Slåttvik | (Norway) Asbjørn Osnes |
| 15 March 1958 | | VIKC | | | |
| 1 March 1959 | | VIKC | (Norway) Arne Hoel | (Norway) Odd A. Brevik | (Norway) Olinius Skaaret |
| 27 March 1960 | | VIKC | (Finland) Markku Maatela | (Finland) Paavo Lukkariniemi | (Norway) Asbjørn Osnes |
| 5 March 1961 | | VIKC | (Norway) Olinius Skaaret | | |
| 4 March 1962 | | VIKC | (Norway) Asbjørn Osnes | (Finland) Pekka Remes | (Finland) Vesa Ekholm |
| 10 March 1963 | | VIKC | (Norway) Torbjørn Yggeseth | (Norway) Torgeir Brandtzæg | (Finland) Raimo Vitikainen |
| 8 March 1964 | | VIKC | (Norway) Toralf Engan | (Norway) Bjørn Wirkola | (Norway) Christoffer Selbekk |
FLYING HILL (converted)
| 13 March 1966 | | VIKC | (Norway) Bjørn Wirkola | (Norway) Toralf Engan | (Norway) Christoffer Selbekk |
| 11-12 March 1967 | | ISFW | (Austria) Reinhold Bachler | (Czechoslovakia) Jiří Raška | (Norway) Bjørn Wirkola |
| 10 March 1968 | | KOP | strong wind | | |
| 8-9 March 1969 | | KOP | (Norway) Bjørn Wirkola | (Czechoslovakia) Jiří Raška | (Czechoslovakia) Zbyněk Hubač |
| 27-28 February 1971 | | KOP | (Norway) Frithjof Prydz | (Czechoslovakia) Zbyněk Hubač | (Norway) Bent Tomtum |
| 11-18 February 1973 | | KOP | lack of snow | | |
| 22-23 February 1975 | | KOP | (Austria) Reinhold Bachler | (Austria) Hans Wallner | (Austria) Edi Federer |
| 18 February 1977 | K150 | SFWC | (Switzerland) Walter Steiner | (Austria) Anton Innauer | (East Germany) Henry Glaß |
| 29 February - 2 March 1980 | K155 | WC | (Norway) Per Bergerud | (Poland) Stanisław Bobak | (Czechoslovakia) Ján Tánczos |
| 18 February 1983 | K155 | WC | (Finland) Matti Nykänen | (Czechoslovakia) Pavel Ploc | (Austria) Hans Wallner |
| 19 February 1983 | K155 | WC | (Finland) Matti Nykänen | (Canada) Horst Bulau | (Finland) Tuomo Ylipulli |
| 20 February 1983 | K155 | WC | (Finland) Matti Nykänen | (Norway) Olav Hansson | (Czechoslovakia) Pavel Ploc |
| 15 February 1986 | K155 | WC | (Austria) Andreas Felder | (Finland) Matti Nykänen | (Poland) Piotr Fijas |
| 16 February 1986 | K155 | WC | (Austria) Andreas Felder | (Austria) Ernst Vettori | (Finland) Matti Nykänen |
| 25 February 1990 | K175 | SFWC | (West Germany) Dieter Thoma | (Finland) Matti Nykänen | (East Germany) Jens Weißflog |
| 20 March 1993 | K175 | WC | cancelled | | |
| 21 March 1993 | K175 | WC | cancelled | | |
| 18 February 1995 | K175 | WC | (Austria) Andreas Goldberger | (Japan) Takanobu Okabe | (Norway) Lasse Ottesen |
| 19 February 1995 | K175 | WC | (Austria) Andreas Goldberger | (Japan) Takanobu Okabe | (Italy) Roberto Cecon |
| 28 February 1998 | K175 | WC | postponed on next day | | |
| 1 March 1998 | K175 | WC | (Austria) Andreas Widhölzl | (Germany) Sven Hannawald | (Japan) Akira Higashi |
| 1 March 1998 | K175 | WC | (Japan) Takanobu Okabe | (Japan) Hiroya Saito | (Japan) Noriaki Kasai |
| 12-13 February 2000 | K185 | SFWC | original date; strong winds, postponed to 14 February | | |
| 14 February 2000 | K185 | SFWC | (Germany) Sven Hannawald | (Austria) Andreas Widhölzl | (Finland) Janne Ahonen |
| 6 March 2004 | K185 | CC | (Austria) Roland Müller | (Norway) Olav Magne Dønnem | (Austria) Balthasar Schneider |
| 7 March 2004 | K185 | CC | (Austria) Roland Müller | (Austria) Balthasar Schneider | (Austria) Martin Koch |
| 13 January 2007 | HS207 | WC | cancelled | | |
| (night) 14 January 2007 | HS207 | WC | (Norway) Anders Jacobsen | (Austria) Thomas Morgenstern | (Finland) Matti Hautamäki |
| (night) 14 March 2009 | HS207 | WC-T | Austria Martin Koch; Wolfgang Loitzl; Thomas Morgenstern; Gregor Schlierenzauer | Finland Matti Hautamäki; Kalle Keituri; Ville Larinto; Harri Olli | Norway Johan Remen Evensen; Bjørn Einar Romøren; Anders Bardal; Anders Jacobsen |
| 15 March 2009 | HS207 | WC | (Austria) Gregor Schlierenzauer | (Switzerland) Simon Ammann | (Russia) Dimitry Vassiliev |
| (night) 12 February 2011 | HS225 | WC | (Austria) Gregor Schlierenzauer (Norway) Johan Remen Evensen | | (Switzerland) Simon Ammann |
| 13 February 2011 | HS225 | WC | (Austria) Gregor Schlierenzauer | (Norway) Johan Remen Evensen | (Poland) Adam Małysz |
| (night) 25 February 2012 | HS225 | SFWC-I | (Slovenia) Robert Kranjec | (Norway) Rune Velta | (Austria) Martin Koch |
| 26 February 2012 | HS225 | SFWC-T | Austria Thomas Morgenstern; Andreas Kofler; Gregor Schlierenzauer; Martin Koch | Germany Andreas Wank; Richard Freitag; Maximilian Mechler; Severin Freund | Slovenia Jernej Damjan; Jurij Tepeš; Jure Šinkovec; Robert Kranjec |
| (night) 26 February 2013 | HS225 | WC | (Austria) Gregor Schlierenzauer | (Switzerland) Simon Ammann | (Slovenia) Robert Kranjec |
| 27 February 2013 | HS225 | WC | (Slovenia) Robert Kranjec | (Germany) Michael Neumayer | (Austria) Gregor Schlierenzauer |
| (night) 14 February 2015 | HS225 | WC | (Slovenia) Peter Prevc | (Norway) Anders Fannemel | (Japan) Noriaki Kasai |
| 15 February 2015 | HS225 | WC | (Germany) Severin Freund | (Norway) Anders Fannemel | (Norway) Johann André Forfang |
| (night) 12 February 2016 | HS225 | WC | (Slovenia) Robert Kranjec | (Norway) Kenneth Gangnes | (Japan) Noriaki Kasai |
| (night) 13 February 2016 | HS225 | WC | (Slovenia) Peter Prevc | (Norway) Johann André Forfang | (Slovenia) Robert Kranjec |
| 14 February 2016 | HS225 | WC | (Slovenia) Peter Prevc | (Austria) Stefan Kraft | (Norway) Andreas Stjernen |
| 17 March 2017 | HS225 | WC/RA(Q)–prol | (Poland) Kamil Stoch | (Germany) Andreas Wellinger | (Slovenia) Domen Prevc |
| 18 March 2017 | HS225 | WC/RA–T | Norway Daniel-André Tande; Robert Johansson; Johann André Forfang; Andreas Stjernen | Poland Piotr Żyła; Dawid Kubacki; Maciej Kot; Kamil Stoch | Austria Michael Hayböck; Manuel Fettner; Gregor Schlierenzauer; Stefan Kraft |
| 19 March 2017 | HS225 | WC/RA–I | (Poland) Kamil Stoch | (Japan) Noriaki Kasai | (Austria) Michael Hayböck |
| 16 March 2018 | HS240 | WC/RA(Q)–prol | (Poland) Kamil Stoch | (Norway) Robert Johansson | (Norway) Andreas Stjernen |
| 17 March 2018 | HS240 | WC/RA–T | Norway Daniel-André Tande; Johann André Forfang; Andreas Stjernen; Robert Johansson | Poland Piotr Żyła; Stefan Hula Jr. Dawid Kubacki; Kamil Stoch | Slovenia Domen Prevc; Jernej Damjan; Tilen Bartol; Peter Prevc |
| 18 March 2018 | HS240 | WC/RA–I | (Norway) Robert Johansson | (Norway) Andreas Stjernen | (Norway) Daniel-André Tande |

The inaugural competition was held on 25 February 1936 in front of 5,000 spectators. Hilmar Myhra won the race, setting the first official hill record at 86 meters (282 ft). The hill was used for a single major competition each year, Vikersundrennet. Arnold Kongsgård beat the hill record in 1946 when he jumped 87.5 meters (287 ft) and then beat it with another meter two years later. The ultimate hill record in the original hill was 98 meters (322 ft), which was also a new Norwegian record, set by Arne Hoel in 1951. After the opening of the new jump in 1957, Hoel set a new hill record of 100.5 meters (330 ft). The following year, Asbjørn Osnes set a new hill record of 108.5 meters (356 ft) and then again in 1960 by Paavo Lukkariniemi of 116.5 meters (382 ft).

On the first ski flying competition on 14 March 1966 saw Bjørn Wirkola set a new world record at 146 meters (479 ft). Starting on 12 March 1967, the club introduced the International Ski Flying Week. The inaugural tournament was held on 12 March 1967 and saw Austria's Reinhold Bachler set a world record of 154 meters (505 ft). On 11 March 1968, the tournament was canceled due to strong winds, although 22,500 people had come to spectate. In 1973, the International Ski Flying Week was canceled because of lack of snow. On this hill were also two Continental Cup competitions in 2004 both won by Austrian Roland Müller.

In the late 1960s, the International Ski Federation (FIS) started planning a world championship in ski flying. The Norwegian Ski Federation was opposed to this. Vikersundbakken was awarded the fourth FIS Ski Flying World Championships, held in 1977. Switzerland's Walter Steiner won the race, while Czechoslovakia's František Novák set a new hill record of 157 meters (515 ft). Vikersundbakken was used in the FIS Ski Jumping World Cup in 1980, 1983 and 1986.

The normal hill was used for the Norwegian Ski Championships in 1989. As there was no snow, 3,000 cubic meters (110,000 cu ft) was freighted by train from Finse via the Bergen Line and up from Vikersund Station by truck.

== Hill record ==
=== Men ===
| No. | Date | | Length |
|---|---|---|---|
| UN | 8 February 1936 | (Norway) Hilmar Myhra | 92.0 m (302 ft) |
| UN | 25 February 1936 | (Norway) Alf Andersen | 94.0 m (308 ft) |
| HR | March 1936 | (Norway) Hilmar Myhra | 85.0 m (279 ft) |
| HR | 17 February 1946 | (Norway) Arnold Kongsgård | 87.5 m (287 ft) |
| HR | 14 March 1948 | (Norway) Arnold Kongsgård | 88.5 m (290 ft) |
| HR | 14 March 1948 | (Sweden) Evert Karlsson | 88.5 m (290 ft) |
| HR | 18 February 1951 | (Norway) Arnold Kongsgård | 89.5 m (294 ft) |
| HR | 18 February 1951 | (Norway) Arne Hoel | 98.0 m (321 ft) |
| HR | 10 March 1957 | (Norway) Arne Hoel | 100.5 m (330 ft) |
| HR | 15 March 1958 | (Norway) Asbjørn Osnes | 108.5 m (356 ft) |
| HR | 27 March 1960 | (Finland) Markku Maatela | 115.0 m (377 ft) |
| HR | 27 March 1960 | (Finland) Paavo Lukkariniemi | 116.5 m (382 ft) |
| #58 | 12 March 1966 | (Norway) Bjørn Wirkola | 145.5 m (476 ft) |
| #59 | 13 March 1966 | (Norway) Bjørn Wirkola | 146.0 m (479 ft) |
| #63 | 12 March 1967 | (Austria) Reinhold Bachler | 154.0 m (505 ft) |
| F | 8 March 1969 | (Czechoslovakia) Ladislav Divila | 166.0 m (545 ft) |
| HR | 20 March 1977 | (Czechoslovakia) František Novák | 157.0 m (515 ft) |
| HR | 15 February 1986 | (Poland) Piotr Fijas | 163.0 m (535 ft) |
| HR | 25 February 1990 | (Norway) Ole Gunnar Fidjestøl | 167.0 m (548 ft) |
| HR | 25 February 1990 | (Finland) Matti Nykänen | 171.0 m (561 ft) |
| HR | 25 February 1990 | (Germany) Dieter Thoma | 171.0 m (561 ft) |
| FR | 16 February 1995 | (Norway) Lasse Ottesen | 182.0 m (597 ft) |
| OT | 17 February 1995 | (Japan) Takanobu Okabe | 188.0 m (617 ft) |
| TR | 18 February 1995 | (Japan) Takanobu Okabe | 194.0 m (636 ft) |
| HR | 18 February 1995 | (Norway) Lasse Ottesen | 175.0 m (574 ft) |

| No. | Date | | Length |
|---|---|---|---|
| F | 18 February 1995 | (Slovenia) Urban Franc | 179.0 m (587 ft) |
| HR | 18 February 1995 | (Austria) Andreas Goldberger | 179.0 m (587 ft) |
| TR | 19 February 1995 | (Norway) Lasse Ottesen | 180.0 m (591 ft) |
| HR | 19 February 1995 | (Slovenia) Urban Franc | 182.0 m (597 ft) |
| HR | 19 February 1995 | (Norway) Lasse Ottesen | 184.0 m (604 ft) |
| HR | 19 February 1995 | (Finland) Ari-Pekka Nikkola | 184.0 m (604 ft) |
| HR | 19 February 1995 | (Japan) Takanobu Okabe | 184.0 m (604 ft) |
| HR | 19 February 1995 | (Finland) Janne Ahonen | 187.0 m (614 ft) |
| F | 19 February 1995 | (Japan) Kazuyoshi Funaki | 193.0 m (633 ft) |
| HR | 19 February 1995 | (Austria) Andreas Goldberger | 188.0 m (617 ft) |
| HR | 1 March 1998 | (Japan) Takanobu Okabe | 194.0 m (636 ft) |
| HR | 11 February 2000 | (Austria) Andreas Goldberger | 207.0 m (679 ft) |
| HR | 12 January 2007 | (Germany) Michael Uhrmann | 214.5 m (704 ft) |
| F | 12 January 2007 | (Austria) Martin Koch | 220.5 m (723 ft) |
| HR | 14 March 2009 | (Austria) Martin Koch | 216.5 m (710 ft) |
| HR | 14 March 2009 | (Finland) Harri Olli | 219.0 m (718 ft) |
| F | 14 March 2009 | (Austria) Gregor Schlierenzauer | 224.0 m (735 ft) |
| HR | 11 February 2011 | (Japan) Daiki Ito | 220.0 m (722 ft) |
| #104 | 11 February 2011 | (Norway) Johan Remen Evensen | 243.0 m (797 ft) |
| #105 | 11 February 2011 | (Norway) Johan Remen Evensen | 246.5 m (809 ft) |
| #106 | 14 February 2015 | (Slovenia) Peter Prevc | 250.0 m (820 ft) |
| F | 15 February 2015 | (Russia) Dmitri Vassiliev | 254.0 m (833 ft) |
| #107 | 15 February 2015 | (Norway) Anders Fannemel | 251.5 m (825 ft) |
| #108 | 18 March 2017 | (Norway) Robert Johansson | 252.0 m (826 ft) |
| #109 | 18 March 2017 | (Austria) Stefan Kraft | 253.5 m (832 ft) |

Unofficial hill record. Test, trial round or training.
Invalid. Fall at world record distance.
Invalid. Fall at hill record distance.

=== Women ===
| Date | | Length |
|---|---|---|
| 6 March 2004 | (Norway) Anette Sagen | 174.5 m (572 ft) |
| 7 March 2004 | (Norway) Helena Olsson Smeby | 174.5 m (572 ft) |
| 18 March 2023 | (Japan) Yūki Itō | 182.5 m (599 ft) |
| 18 March 2023 | (Canada) Alexandria Loutitt | 186.5 m (612 ft) |
| 18 March 2023 | (Norway) Silje Opseth | 186.5 m (612 ft) |
| 18 March 2023 | (Japan) Yūki Itō | 191.5 m (628 ft) |
| 18 March 2023 | (Norway) Maren Lundby | 199.0 m (653 ft) |
| 18 March 2023 | (Slovenia) Ema Klinec | 203.0 m (666 ft) |
| 18 March 2023 | (Norway) Maren Lundby | 212.5 m (697 ft) |
| 18 March 2023 | (Canada) Alexandria Loutitt | 222.0 m (728 ft) |
| 19 March 2023 | (Slovenia) Ema Klinec | 226.0 m (741 ft) |
| 17 March 2024 | (Norway) Silje Opseth | 230.5 m (756 ft) |

== Technical data ==
Specifications
| Inrun length | 124 m |
| Inrun angle | 36° |
| Top to bottom height difference | N/A |
| Take-off table to bottom height difference | 135 m |
| Take-off table height | 2.42 m |
| Landing zone angle | 30° - 38° |
| Hillsize | 240 m |
| K-point | 200 m |
