= 1981–82 Four Hills Tournament =

Ski jumping competition

The 1981-82 Four Hills Tournament took place at the four traditional venues of Oberstdorf, Garmisch-Partenkirchen, Innsbruck and Bischofshofen, located in Germany and Austria, between 30 December 1981 and 6 January 1982.

== Results ==
Date	Place	Hill	Size	Winner	Second	Third	Ref.
30 Dec 1981	(West Germany) Oberstdorf	Schattenbergschanze K-110	LH	(Finland) Matti Nykänen	(East Germany) Manfred Deckert	(West Germany) Thomas Prosser	
1 Jan 1982	(West Germany) Garmisch-Partenkirchen	Große Olympiaschanze K-107	LH	(Norway) Roger Ruud	(East Germany) Manfred Deckert	(West Germany) Andreas Bauer	
3 Jan 1982	(Austria) Innsbruck	Bergiselschanze K-104	LH	(East Germany) Manfred Deckert (Norway) Per Bergerud		(Norway) Roger Ruud	
6 Jan 1982	(Austria) Bischofshofen	Paul-Ausserleitner-Schanze K-109	LH	(Austria) Hubert Neuper	(Norway) Halvor Asphol	(Austria) Armin Kogler	

== Overall ==
Pos	Ski Jumper	Points
1	(East Germany) Manfred Deckert	951.4
2	(Norway) Roger Ruud	915.4
3	(Norway) Per Bergerud	907.9
4	(West Germany) Christoph Schwarz	904.5
5	(Norway) Halvor Asphol	897.8
5	(Austria) Hubert Neuper	897.8
7	(West Germany) Andreas Bauer	894,5
8	(Norway) Dag Holmen-Jensen	890.8
9	(Austria) Alfred Groyer	889.2
10	(Austria) Armin Kogler	879.5
