= 1981–82 FIS Ski Jumping World Cup =

Ski jumping championship season

1981–82 World Cup
Winners
- Overall: (Austria) Armin Kogler
- Four Hills Tournament: (East Germany) Manfred Deckert
- Swiss Tournament: (Italy) Massimo Rigoni
- K.O.P. Ski Flying Week: (Austria) Hubert Neuper
- Nations Cup: Austria

Competitions
- Venues: 14
- Individual: 22
- Cancelled: 2

The 1981–82 FIS Ski Jumping World Cup was the third World Cup season in ski jumping.

It began in Cortina d'Ampezzo, Italy on 20 December 1981 and finished in Planica, Yugoslavia on 28 March 1982. The individual World Cup overall winner was Austrian ski jumper Armin Kogler for the second year in a row (although he won only three times this season and Ole Bremseth six wins in total) and Nations Cup was taken by Team of Austria.

22 men's individual events on 14 different venues in 11 countries were held. Two individual World Cup competitions in St. Nizier were completely cancelled due to lack of snow.

Peaks of the season were FIS Nordic World Ski Championships which also counted for World Cup points (the only time in history that Nordic World Championships also counted for WC) and Four Hills Tournament, Swiss Tournament and K.O.P. International Ski Flying Week

Competitions were held on three different continents; Europe, Asia and North America.

== Map of world cup hosts ==
Europe
West Germany	Austria Canada	Asia

== Calendar ==
=== Men's Individual ===
N – normal hill / L – large hill / F – flying hill
All	No.	Date	Place (Hill)	Size	Winner	Second	Third	Overall leader (Note: Yellow bib for the overall leader was introduced later, from the 1988/89 season onwards.)	R.
50	1	20 December 1981	(Italy) Cortina d’Ampezzo (Trampolino Olimpico K92)	N _{017}	(Norway) Roger Ruud	(Norway) Johan Sætre	(Japan) Masahiro Akimoto	(Norway) Roger Ruud	
51	2	30 December 1981	(West Germany) Oberstdorf (Schattenbergschanze K110)	L _{031}	(Finland) Matti Nykänen	(East Germany) Manfred Deckert	(West Germany) Thomas Prosser	(Norway) Roger Ruud	
52	3	1 January 1982	(West Germany) Garmisch-Pa; Große Olympiaschanze K107)	L _{032}	(Norway) Roger Ruud	(East Germany) Manfred Deckert	(West Germany) Andreas Bauer	(Norway) Roger Ruud	
53	4	3 January 1982	(Austria) Innsbruck (Bergiselschanze K104)	L _{033}	(East Germany) Manfred Deckert (Norway) Per Bergerud		(Norway) Roger Ruud	(Norway) Roger Ruud	
54	5	6 January 1982	(Austria) Bischofshofen (Paul-Ausserleitner K109)	L _{034}	(Austria) Hubert Neuper	(Norway) Halvor Asphol	(Austria) Armin Kogler	(East Germany) Manfred Deckert	
30th Four Hills Tournament Overall (30 December 1981 – 6 January 1982)					(East Germany) Manfred Deckert	(Norway) Roger Ruud	(Norway) Per Bergerud	4H Tournament	
		9 January 1982	(France) Saint Nizier (Dauphine K112)	L _{cnx}	cancelled due to lack of snow			—	
		10 January 1982	(France) Saint Nizier (Dauphine K112)	L _{cnx}	cancelled due to lack of snow			—	
55	6	15 January 1982	(Japan) Sapporo (Miyanomori K86) (Ōkurayama K110)	N _{018}	(Canada) Horst Bulau	(Norway) Per Bergerud	(Japan) Masahiro Akimoto	(Norway) Roger Ruud	
56	7	17 January 1982	(Japan) Sapporo (Miyanomori K86) (Ōkurayama K110)	L _{035}	(Austria) Armin Kogler	(Canada) Horst Bulau	(East Germany) Matthias Buse	(Norway) Roger Ruud	
57	8	23 January 1982	(Canada) Thunder Bay (Big Thunder K89, K120)	N _{019}	(Canada) Horst Bulau	(Italy) Massimo Rigoni	(Austria) Ernst Vettori	(Norway) Roger Ruud	
58	9	24 January 1982	(Canada) Thunder Bay (Big Thunder K89, K120)	L _{036}	(Canada) Horst Bulau	(Italy) Massimo Rigoni	(Austria) Hubert Neuper	(Canada) Horst Bulau	
59	10	27 January 1982	(Switzerland) St. Moritz (Olympiaschanze K96)	N _{020}	(Austria) Armin Kogler	(Czechoslovakia) Josef Samek	(Switzerland) Hansjörg Sumi	(Canada) Horst Bulau	
60	11	31 January 1982	(Switzerland) Engelberg (Gross-Titlis-Schanze K116)	L _{037}	(East Germany) Klaus Ostwald	(Italy) Massimo Rigoni	(Austria) Armin Kogler	(Austria) Armin Kogler	
19th Swiss Tournament Overall (27 – 31 January 1982)					(Italy) Massimo Rigoni	(Austria) Armin Kogler	(East Germany) Klaus Ostwald	Swiss Tournament	
FIS World Cup 1981/82 = FIS Nordic World Ski Championships 1982 (21 – 28 February • Oslo)
61	12	21 February 1982	(Norway) Oslo (Midtstubakken K85) (Holmenkollbakken K105)	N _{021}	(Austria) Armin Kogler	(Finland) Jari Puikkonen	(Norway) Ole Bremseth	(Austria) Armin Kogler	
62	13	28 February 1982	(Norway) Oslo (Midtstubakken K85) (Holmenkollbakken K105)	L _{038}	(Finland) Matti Nykänen	(Norway) Olav Hansson	(Austria) Armin Kogler	(Austria) Armin Kogler	
63	14	4 March 1982	(Finland) Lahti (Salpausselkä K88)	N _{022}	(Norway) Ole Bremseth	(Finland) Pentti Kokkonen	(Canada) Horst Bulau	(Austria) Armin Kogler	
64	15	7 March 1982	(Finland) Lahti (Salpausselkä K88)	N _{023}	(Norway) Ole Bremseth	(Finland) Matti Nykänen	(Austria) Alfred Groyer	(Austria) Armin Kogler	
65	16	12 March 1982	(Austria) Bad Mitterndorf (Kulm K165)	F _{004}	(Finland) Matti Nykänen	(Austria) Hubert Neuper	(Austria) Andreas Felder	(Austria) Armin Kogler	
66	17	13 March 1982	(Austria) Bad Mitterndorf (Kulm K165)	F _{005}	(Austria) Hubert Neuper	(Finland) Matti Nykänen	(Norway) Ole Bremseth	(Austria) Armin Kogler	
67	18	14 March 1982	(Austria) Bad Mitterndorf (Kulm K165)	F _{006}	(Austria) Hubert Neuper	(Norway) Ole Bremseth	(Austria) Armin Kogler	(Austria) Armin Kogler	
29th K.O.P. International Ski Flying Week Overall (12 – 14 March 1982)					(Austria) Hubert Neuper	(Finland) Matti Nykänen	(Austria) Andreas Felder	K.O.P.	
68	19	20 March 1982	(Czechoslovakia) Štrbské Pleso (MS 1970 A K110, K88)	L _{039}	(Norway) Ole Bremseth	(Poland) Piotr Fijas	(United States) Jeff Hastings	(Austria) Armin Kogler	
69	20	21 March 1982	(Czechoslovakia) Štrbské Pleso (MS 1970 A K110, K88)	N _{024}	(Norway) Ole Bremseth	(Norway) Olav Hansson	(Norway) Johan Sætre	(Austria) Armin Kogler	
70	21	27 March 1982	(Socialist Federal Republic of Yugoslavia) Planica (Srednja Bloudkova K90) (Bloudkova velikanka K120)	N _{025}	(Norway) Ole Bremseth	(Norway) Per Bergerud	(Italy) Massimo Rigoni	(Austria) Armin Kogler	
71	22	28 March 1982	(Socialist Federal Republic of Yugoslavia) Planica (Srednja Bloudkova K90) (Bloudkova velikanka K120)	L _{040}	(Norway) Ole Bremseth	(Austria) Hubert Neuper	(Italy) Massimo Rigoni	(Austria) Armin Kogler	
3rd FIS World Cup Overall (20 December 1981 – 28 March 1982)					(Austria) Armin Kogler	(Austria) Hubert Neuper	(Canada) Horst Bulau	World Cup Overall	

== Standings ==
=== Overall ===
Rank	after 22 events	Points
1	(Austria) Armin Kogler	189
2	(Austria) Hubert Neuper	174
3	(Canada) Horst Bulau	150
4	(Finland) Matti Nykänen	138
5	(Norway) Ole Bremseth	136
6	(Norway) Per Bergerud	129
7	(Italy) Massimo Rigoni	125
8	(Norway) Roger Ruud	112
9	(Norway) Johan Sætre	100
10	(West Germany) Andreas Bauer	85

=== Nations Cup ===
Rank	after 22 events	Points
1	Austria	803
2	Norway	776
3	Finland	301
4	West Germany	234
5	East Germany	216
6	Canada	186
7	Italy	152
8	Czechoslovakia	94
9	United States	86
10	Yugoslavia	58

=== Four Hills Tournament ===
Rank	after 4 events	Points
1	(East Germany) Manfred Deckert	951.4
2	(Norway) Roger Ruud	915.4
3	(Norway) Per Bergerud	907.9
4	(West Germany) Christoph Schwarz	904.5
5	(Norway) Halvor Asphol	897.8
	(Austria) Hubert Neuper	897.8
7	(West Germany) Andreas Bauer	894.5
8	(Norway) Dag Holmen-Jensen	890.8
9	(Austria) Alfred Groyer	889.2
10	(Austria) Armin Kogler	879.5

=== Swiss Tournament ===
Rank	after 2 events	Points
1	(Italy) Massimo Rigoni	496.6
2	(Austria) Armin Kogler	485.8
3	(East Germany) Klaus Ostwald	N/A
4	(West Germany) Andreas Bauer	480.6
5	(Czechoslovakia) Josef Samek	471.6
6	(East Germany) Matthias Buse	N/A
7	(Austria) Hans Wallner	N/A
8	(Norway) Vegard Opaas	459.1

== See also ==
- 1981–82 FIS Europa Cup (2nd level competition)
