= 1982–83 FIS Ski Jumping World Cup =

Ski jumping championship season

1982–83 World Cup
Winners
- Overall: (Finland) Matti Nykänen
- Four Hills Tournament: (Finland) Matti Nykänen
- Swiss Tournament: (Norway) Per Bergerud
- Bohemia Tournament: (East Germany) Klaus Ostwald
- K.O.P. Ski Flying Week: (Finland) Matti Nykänen
- Nations Cup: Norway

Competitions
- Venues: 17
- Individual: 25
- Rescheduled: 1

The 1982–83 FIS Ski Jumping World Cup was the fourth World Cup season in ski jumping.

Season began in Cortina d'Ampezzo, Italy on 18 December 1982 and was finished in Planica, Yugoslavia on 27 March 1983. The individual World Cup overall winner was Finnish ski jumper Matti Nykänen who also won Four Hills Tournament, Per Bergerud won Swiss Tournament and Klaus Ostwald won Bohemia Tournament. Nations Cup was given to Team of Norway.

25 men's individual events on 17 different venues in 12 countries on two different continents (Europe and North America) were held. No competition was cancelled this season, but one was rescheduled from Liberec to Harrachov due to lack of snow.

Peaks of the season were Four Hills Tournament, Swiss Tournament, Bohemia Tournament and K.O.P. International Ski Flying Week and FIS Ski Flying World Championships.

Competitions were held on two different continents; Europe and North America.

On 19 March 1983, in Harrachov, Czechoslovak ski jumper Pavel Ploc set and improved the world record on 181 metres (594 ft. This competition was full of hard crashes.

== Map of world cup hosts ==
Europe
West Germany	North America	Austria

== Calendar ==
=== Men's Individual ===
N – normal hill / L – large hill / F – flying hill
All	No.	Date	Place (Hill)	Size	Winner	Second	Third	Overall leader (Note: Yellow bib for the overall leader was introduced later, from the 1988/89 season onwards.)	R.
72	1	18 December 1982	(Italy) Cortina d’Ampezzo (Trampolino Olimpico K92)	N _{026}	(Finland) Matti Nykänen	(Norway) Olav Hansson	(Norway) Per Bergerud	(Finland) Matti Nykänen	
73	2	30 December 1982	(West Germany) Oberstdorf (Schattenbergschanze K110)	L _{041}	(Canada) Horst Bulau	(Finland) Matti Nykänen	(Austria) Armin Kogler	(Finland) Matti Nykänen	
74	3	1 January 1983	(West Germany) Garmisch-Pa (Große Olympiaschanze K107)	L _{042}	(Austria) Armin Kogler	(Norway) Steinar Bråten	(East Germany) Jens Weißflog	(Finland) Matti Nykänen	
75	4	4 January 1983	(Austria) Innsbruck (Bergiselschanze K104)	L _{043}	(Finland) Matti Nykänen	(East Germany) Jens Weißflog	(Canada) Horst Bulau	(Finland) Matti Nykänen	
76	5	6 January 1983	(Austria) Bischofshofen (Paul-Ausserleitner K109)	L _{044}	(East Germany) Jens Weißflog	(Norway) Olav Hansson	(Austria) Richard Schallert	(Finland) Matti Nykänen	
31st Four Hills Tournament Overall (30 December 1982 – 6 January 1983)					(Finland) Matti Nykänen	(East Germany) Jens Weißflog	(Canada) Horst Bulau	4H Tournament	
77	6	8 January 1983	(Czechoslovakia) Harrachov (Čerťák K120)	L _{045}	(East Germany) Holger Freitag	(Finland) Markku Pusenius	(East Germany) Klaus Ostwald	(Finland) Matti Nykänen	
		9 January 1983	(Czechoslovakia) Liberec (Ještěd A K120)	L _{cnx}	rescheduled to Harrachov due to lack of snow			—	
78	7	(Note: Cancelled event from Liberec (9 January) was rescheduled to Harrachov on same day.)9 January 1983	(Czechoslovakia) Harrachov (Čerťák K120)	L _{046}	(Czechoslovakia) Pavel Ploc	(East Germany) Klaus Ostwald	(Finland) Markku Pusenius	(Finland) Matti Nykänen	
20th Bohemia Tournament Overall (8 – 9 January 1983)					(East Germany) Klaus Ostwald	(Finland) Markku Pusenius	(Czechoslovakia) Pavel Ploc	Bohemia Tournament	
79	8	15 January 1983	(United States) Lake Placid (MacKenzie Intervale K114)	L _{047}	(Finland) Matti Nykänen	(Austria) Armin Kogler	(United States) Jeff Hastings	(Finland) Matti Nykänen	
80	9	16 January 1983	(United States) Lake Placid (MacKenzie Intervale K114)	L _{048}	(Finland) Matti Nykänen	(Austria) Armin Kogler	(Norway) Steinar Bråten	(Finland) Matti Nykänen	
81	10	22 January 1983	(Canada) Thunder Bay (Big Thunder K89, K120)	N _{027}	(Canada) Horst Bulau	(Norway) Olav Hansson	(Finland) Pentti Kokkonen	(Finland) Matti Nykänen	
82	11	23 January 1983	(Canada) Thunder Bay (Big Thunder K89, K120)	L _{049}	(Finland) Matti Nykänen	(Canada) Horst Bulau	(Norway) Olav Hansson	(Finland) Matti Nykänen	
83	12	26 January 1983	(Switzerland) St. Moritz (Olympiaschanze K94)	N _{028}	(Canada) Horst Bulau	(Norway) Per Bergerud	(Finland) Pentti Kokkonen	(Finland) Matti Nykänen	
84	13	28 January 1983	(Switzerland) Gstaad (Mattenschanze K88)	N _{029}	(Canada) Horst Bulau	(Norway) Roger Ruud	(Austria) Ernst Vettori	(Finland) Matti Nykänen	
85	14	(Note: Only one round held in Engelberg due to strong wind and snow.)30 January 1983	(Switzerland) Engelberg (Gross-Titlis-Schanze K116)	L _{050}	(Norway) Per Bergerud	(United States) Jeff Hastings	(East Germany) Stefan Stannarius	(Finland) Matti Nykänen	
20th Swiss Tournament Overall (26 – 30 January 1983)					(Norway) Per Bergerud	(Finland) Pentti Kokkonen	(Finland) Jari Puikkonen	Swiss Tournament	
86	15	18 February 1983	(Norway) Vikersund (Vikersundbakken K155)	F _{007}	(Finland) Matti Nykänen	(Czechoslovakia) Pavel Ploc (Austria) Hans Wallner		(Finland) Matti Nykänen	
87	16	19 February 1983	(Norway) Vikersund (Vikersundbakken K155)	F _{008}	(Finland) Matti Nykänen	(Canada) Horst Bulau	(Finland) Tuomo Ylipulli	(Finland) Matti Nykänen	
88	17	20 February 1983	(Norway) Vikersund (Vikersundbakken K155)	F _{009}	(Finland) Matti Nykänen	(Norway) Olav Hansson	(Czechoslovakia) Pavel Ploc	(Finland) Matti Nykänen	
30th K.O.P. International Ski Flying Week Overall (18 – 20 February 1983)					(Finland) Matti Nykänen	(Czechoslovakia) Pavel Ploc	(Canada) Horst Bulau	K.O.P.	
89	18	25 February 1983	(Sweden) Falun (Lugnet K89, K112)	N _{030}	(Canada) Horst Bulau	(Finland) Matti Nykänen	(Norway) Olav Hansson	(Finland) Matti Nykänen	
90	19	27 February 1983	(Sweden) Falun (Lugnet K89, K112)	L _{051}	(Finland) Matti Nykänen	(Austria) Armin Kogler	(Norway) Ole Bremseth	(Finland) Matti Nykänen	
91	20	4 March 1983	(Finland) Lahti (Salpausselkä K88, K113)	N _{031}	(Canada) Horst Bulau	(Austria) Armin Kogler	(Finland) Pentti Kokkonen	(Finland) Matti Nykänen	
92	21	6 March 1983	(Finland) Lahti (Salpausselkä K88, K113)	L _{052}	(Canada) Horst Bulau	(Austria) Armin Kogler	(Finland) Matti Nykänen	(Finland) Matti Nykänen	
93	22	11 March 1983	(Norway) Bærum (Skuibakken K110)	L _{053}	(Austria) Armin Kogler	(Norway) Olav Hansson	(Canada) Horst Bulau	(Finland) Matti Nykänen	
94	23	13 March 1983	(Norway) Oslo (Holmenkollbakken K105)	L _{054}	(Norway) Steinar Bråten	(Canada) Horst Bulau	(Austria) Armin Kogler	(Canada) Horst Bulau	
FIS Ski Flying World Championships 1983 (18 – 20 March • (Czechoslovakia) Čerťák)
95	24	26 March 1983	(Socialist Federal Republic of Yugoslavia) Planica (Srednja Bloudkova K90) (Bloudkova velikanka K120)	N _{032}	(Finland) Matti Nykänen	(Socialist Federal Republic of Yugoslavia) Primož Ulaga	(Norway) Olav Hansson	(Finland) Matti Nykänen	
96	25	27 March 1983	(Socialist Federal Republic of Yugoslavia) Planica (Srednja Bloudkova K90) (Bloudkova velikanka K120)	L _{055}	(Socialist Federal Republic of Yugoslavia) Primož Ulaga	(Canada) Horst Bulau	(Austria) Richard Schallert	(Finland) Matti Nykänen	
4th FIS World Cup Overall (18 December 1982 – 27 March 1983)					(Finland) Matti Nykänen	(Canada) Horst Bulau	(Austria) Armin Kogler	World Cup Overall	

== Standings ==
=== Overall ===
Rank	after 25 events	Points
1	(Finland) Matti Nykänen	270
2	(Canada) Horst Bulau	260
3	(Austria) Armin Kogler	211
4	(Norway) Olav Hansson	186
5	(Norway) Per Bergerud	137
6	(Norway) Steinar Bråten	126
7	(Finland) Pentti Kokkonen	115
8	(Norway) Ole Bremseth	99
9	(Finland) Jari Puikkonen	97
10	(United States) Jeff Hastings	93

=== Nations Cup ===
Rank	after 25 events	Points
1	Norway	859
2	Finland	696
3	Austria	581
4	Canada	387
5	East Germany	267
6	United States	224
7	Czechoslovakia	144
8	Yugoslavia	101
9	West Germany	72
10	Italy	50

=== Four Hills Tournament ===
Rank	after 4 events	Points
1	(Finland) Matti Nykänen	989.8
2	(East Germany) Jens Weißflog	972.2
3	(Canada) Horst Bulau	960.9
4	(Norway) Per Bergerud	959.5
5	(Norway) Steinar Bråten	955.1
6	(Austria) Richard Schallert	954.6
7	(Finland) Pentti Kokkonen	952.1
8	(Norway) Olav Hansson	945.9
9	(Norway) Ole Bremseth	936.8
10	(East Germany) Klaus Ostwald	929.1

=== Bohemia Tournament ===
Rank	after 2 events	Points
1	(East Germany) Klaus Ostwald	512.7
2	(Finland) Markku Pusenius	511.6
3	(Czechoslovakia) Pavel Ploc	510.9
↓ . . . . . . uncompleted order . . . . . . ↓
N/A	(Austria) Armin Kogler	495.4
N/A	(Finland) Matti Nykänen	492.7
N/A	(East Germany) Ulf Findeisen	484.7
N/A	(Czechoslovakia) Jiří Parma	468.8
N/A	(Poland) Piotr Fijas	461.9

=== Swiss Tournament ===
Rank	after 3 events	Points
1	(Norway) Per Bergerud	611.9
2	(Finland) Pentti Kokkonen	600.1
3	(Finland) Jari Puikkonen	591.9
↓ . . . . . . uncompleted order . . . . . . ↓
N/A	(Austria) Olav Hansson	587.4
N/A	(Finland) Richard Schallert	574.7

== See also ==
- 1982–83 FIS Europa Cup (2nd level competition)
