= Manfred Deckert =

East German ski jumper

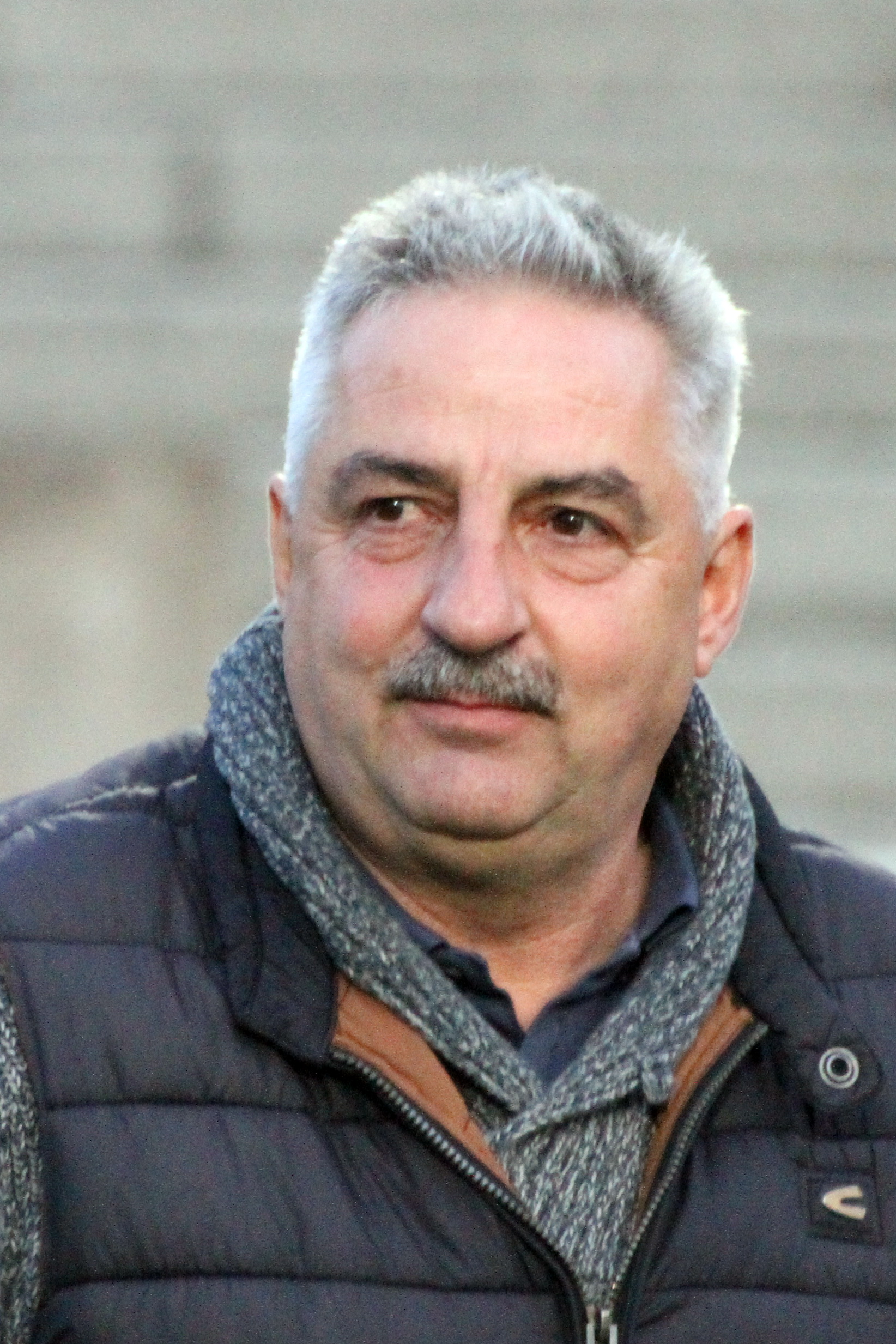

Personal information
- Nationality: East Germany
- Born: 31 March 1961 (age 65) Halle, East Germany

Sport
- Sport: Skiing

World Cup career
- Seasons: 1980–1985; 1988
- Indiv. starts: 30
- Indiv. podiums: 3
- Indiv. wins: 1
- Four Hills titles: 1 (1982)
Medal record
Men's ski jumping
Representing East Germany
Olympic Games
Silver medal – second place	1980 Lake Placid	Individual NH
World Championships
Silver medal – second place	1980 Lake Placid	Individual NH
Bronze medal – third place	1985 Seefeld	Team LH
- Updated on 10 February 2016

Manfred Deckert (born 31 March 1961) is an East German former ski jumper.

== Career ==
He won the overall victory at the Four Hills Tournament in the 1981–82 season. Deckert represented Klingenthal at the 1980 Winter Olympics in Lake Placid, New York, winning a silver medal in the normal hill competition (tied with Hirokazu Yagi of Japan). He also won a bronze medal in the team large hill competition at the 1985 FIS Nordic World Ski Championships in Seefeld.

Deckert is currently the President for VSC Klingenthal / SC Dynamo Klingenthal.

== World Cup ==
=== Standings ===
Season	Overall	4H
1979/80	45	13
1980/81	49	41
1981/82	12	1st place, gold medalist(s)
1982/83	49	—
1983/84	52	28
1984/85	31	12
1987/88	—	48

=== Wins ===
No.	Season	Date	Location	Hill	Size
1	1981/82	3 January 1982	(Austria) Innsbruck	Bergiselschanze K104	LH
