= Selbekk =

Selbekk is a Norwegian surname. Notable people with the surname include:

- Christoffer Selbekk (1939–2012), Norwegian businessman and ski jumper
- Vebjørn Selbekk (born 1969), Norwegian newspaper editor and author
