= Andreas Bauer (ski jumper) =

German ski jumper

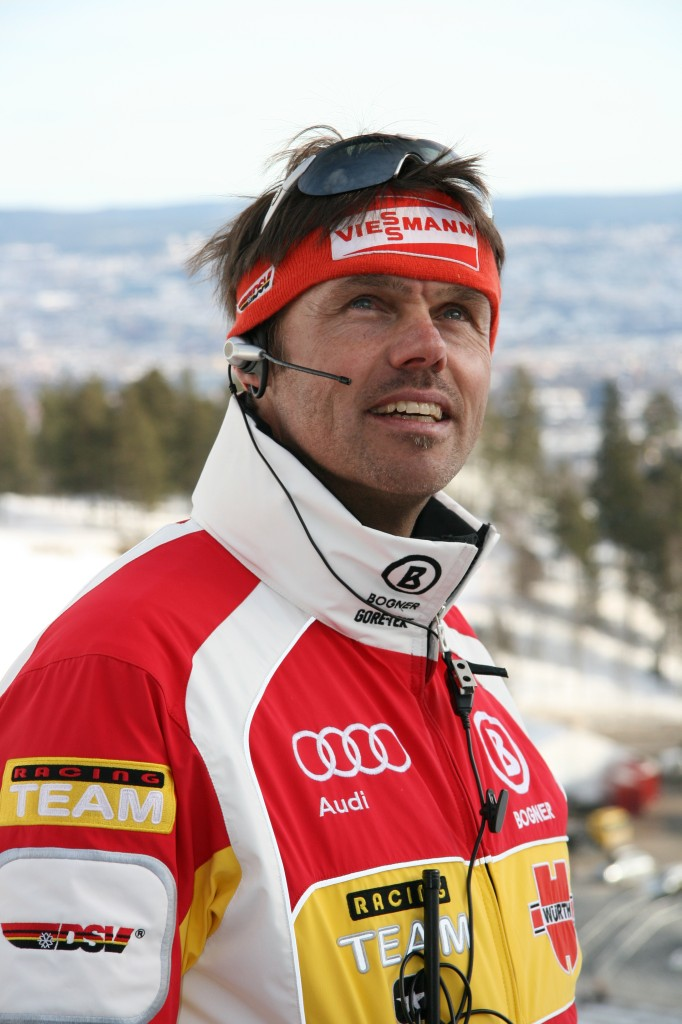

Personal information
- Nationality: West Germany (1980-90); Germany (1990-92)
- Born: 21 January 1964 (age 62) Oberstdorf, West Germany
- Height: 1.84 m (6 ft 1/2 in)

Sport
- Sport: Skiing

World Cup career
- Seasons: 1981–1992
- Indiv. starts: 126
- Indiv. podiums: 6
- Indiv. wins: 1
- Updated on 10 February 2016

Andreas Bauer (born 21 January 1964) is a West German/German former ski jumper.

== Career ==
Competing in two Winter Olympics, he finished sixth in the team large hill in 1988 and seventh in the individual large hill in 1984.

Bauer's best finish at the FIS Nordic World Ski Championships was 18th in the individual normal hill at Lahti in 1989. He also finished 21st in the FIS Ski-Flying World Championships 1990 at Vikersund. Bauer's lone career World Cup victory was at an individual normal hill event in West Germany in 1987.

Since 2005 he has worked as a ski jumping coach for the German national team in Nordic combined skiing.

== World Cup ==
=== Standings ===
Season	Overall	4H	SF
1980/81	56	46	N/A
1981/82	11	7	N/A
1982/83	38	23	N/A
1983/84	12	55	N/A
1984/85	32	18	N/A
1985/86	42	29	N/A
1986/87	14	6	N/A
1987/88	11	8	N/A
1988/89	23	25	N/A
1989/90	26	18	N/A
1990/91	32	23	—
1991/92	—	66	—

=== Wins ===
No.	Season	Date	Location	Hill	Size
1	1986/87	1 January 1987	(West Germany) Garmisch-Partenkirchen	Große Olympiaschanze K107	LH
