= Hilmar Myhra =

Norwegian ski jumper (1915–2013)

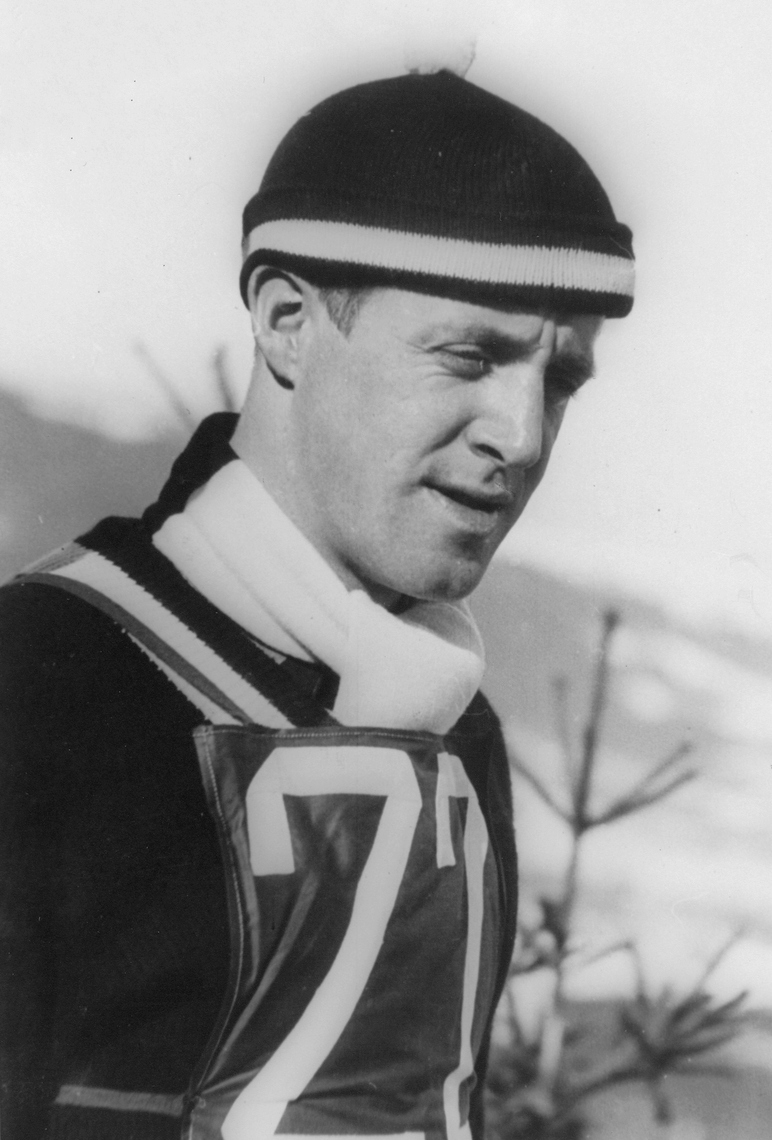

Personal information
- Born: 4 June 1915 Kongsberg, Norway
- Died: 13 April 2013 (aged 97)

Sport
- Sport: Ski jumping
- Club: Kongsberg IF
Medal record
Representing Norway
World Championships
Bronze medal – third place	1938 Lahti	Individual large hill

Hilmar Arnold Myhra (4 June 1915 – 13 April 2013) was a Norwegian ski jumper who competed before World War II. He won the opening competition of the hill Vikersundbakken in February 1936, and held the hill record of 85 meters for a few years. It was broken by Arnholdt Kongsgård in 1946.

He also won a bronze medal in the individual large hill at the 1938 Nordic World Ski Championships in Lahti, and finished sixth in the same event at the 1939 Nordic World Ski Championships in Zakopane. Myhra also won the ski jumping event at the Holmenkollen ski festival in 1940, the last winner of the event before Norway would be invaded by Germany during World War II. He also became Norwegian champion that year.

Besides skiing Myhra also played association football, during the summer, and a head injury sustained in a football match in August 1945 ended his sporting career.
