= Pål Hansen =

Norwegian ski jumper

Pål Hansen (born 1972) is a retired Norwegian ski jumper.

He made his FIS Alpine Ski World Cup debut in March 1992 in Trondheim. He collected his first World Cup points with a 20th-place finish in the January 1993 ski flying event at Kulm. He broke the top 30 one more time, in February 1996 in Iron Mountain. His last World Cup outing came in March 1996 during the Holmenkollen ski festival. Hansen holds the hill record in Skuibakken and Hannibalbakken.

He represented the sports club IL Stålkameratene.
