= Ehkä otin, ehkä en =

Studio album by Matti Nykänen
- Released: March 1, 2006
- Recorded: 2002–2006
- Studio: Studio Kaktus (Jyväskylä)
- Genre: Hard rock
- Length: 37:57
- Language: Finnish
- Label: Edel Records
- Producer: Jussi Niemi

Matti Nykänen chronology
Samurai (1993)	Ehkä otin, ehkä en (2006)

Ehkä otin, ehkä en (English: "Maybe I took v5[something], maybe I didn't") is the third studio album by Matti Nykänen. It was released in 2006 by Edel Records Finland. At nearly 38 minutes, it is Nykänen's longest studio album.

== Track listing ==
No.	Title	Writer(s)	Length
1.	"Ehkä otin, ehkä en"	Pertti Suuronen/E. Terävä/Jussi Niemi	3:22
2.	"Sydän villisti lyö"	Jussi Niemi/Pertti Suuronen	3:41
3.	"Kierros kaikille"	Vexi Salmi	4:00
4.	"Tää on mun elämää"	E. Terävä	3:24
5.	"Mäkikotka ja häkkilintu"	Vexi Salmi	3:38
6.	"Mervin ja Matin parempi rakkauslaulu"	Vexi Salmi	3:01
7.	"Samaa nauhaa"	V. Majakoski	2:41
8.	"Lööpistä lööppiin"	Vexi Salmi	3:04
9.	"Elämä on laiffii"	Jussi Niemi/Pentti Vanhamäki	3:33
10.	"Yllätysten yö"	Ensio Käämi	3:00
11.	"Maan korvessa"	Vexi Salmi	5:53
Total length:			37:57

== Credits ==
- Matti Nykänen – vocals
- Jussi Niemi – guitar, vocals
- Harri Rantanen – bass guitar
- Anssi Nykänen – drums
- Risto Närhi – hammond organ
- Jukka Kautto – guitar
- Mikko Saikkonen – saxophone
