= Mattihan se sopan keitti =

Mattihan se sopan keitti was a Finnish cookery web television series presented by ski jumping legend Matti Nykänen. The name is a double entendre: while the literal meaning is "Matti cooked the soup", it can also be interpreted as "Matti caused the trouble".

The first episode of Mattihan se sopan keitti aired on November 27, 2009 on the Sub TV channel website, with additional episodes following twice a week.

== Episodes ==
1. Kalasoppa (fish soup)
2. Thaisoppa (Thai soup)
3. Makkarasoppa (sausage soup)
4. Tomaattisoppa (tomato soup)
5. Kaalisoppa (cabbage soup)
6. Jauhelihasoppa (mince soup)
7. Juuressoppa (root vegetable soup)
8. Borssisoppa (borscht soup)
9. Kermainen kanasoppa (chicken soup)
10. Pinaattisoppa (spinach soup)
