= Skuibakken =

Large hill in Bærum, Viken, Norway

Coordinates: 59°55′36″N 10°26′28″E

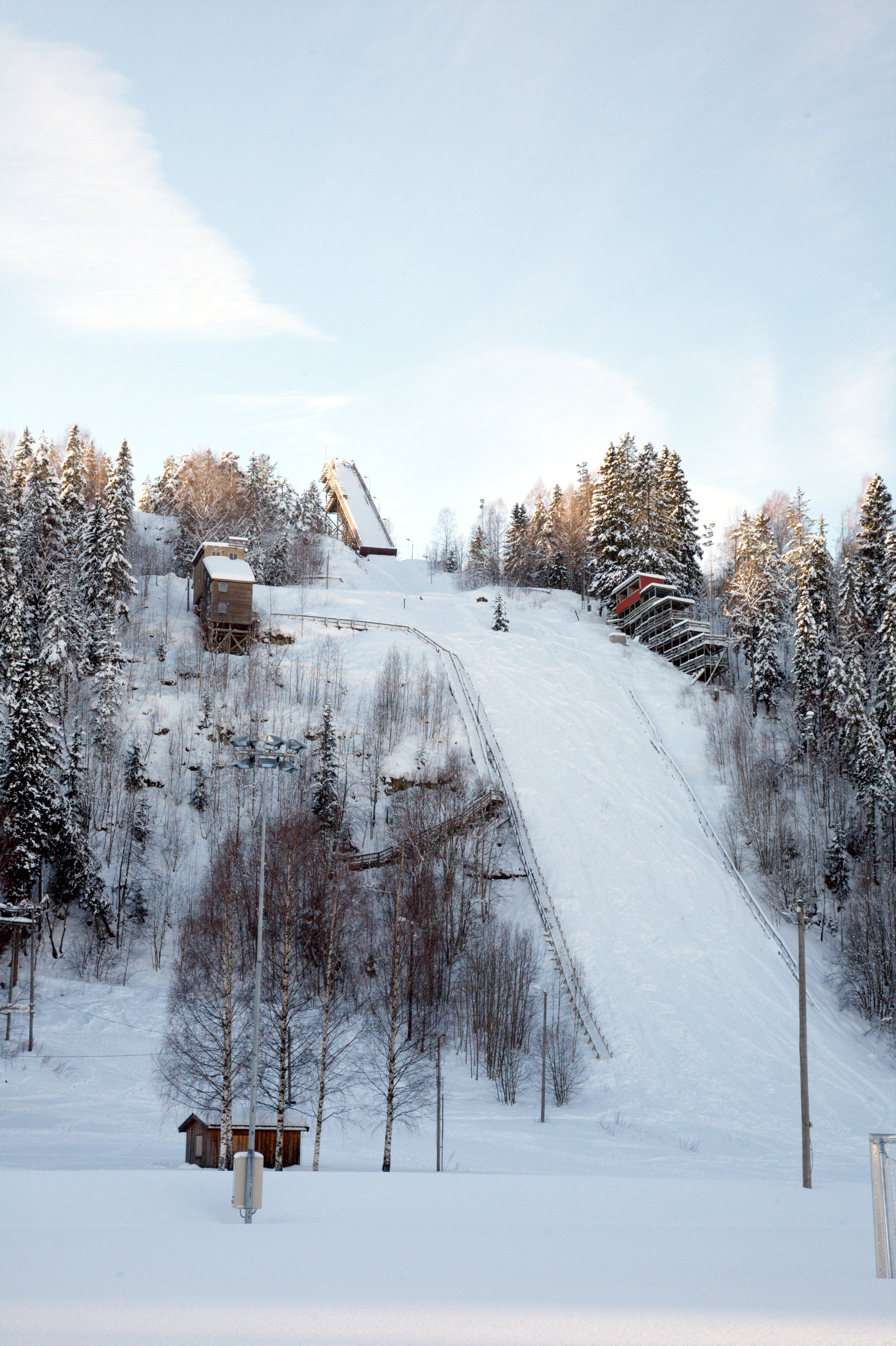
- Location: Bærum; Norway
- Opened: 1928

Size
- K–point: K-110
- Hill size: HS 119
- Hill record: 122 m (400 ft) (Norway) Paal Hansen (1995)

Skuibakken is a ski jumping hill in Bærum in Akershus county, Norway.

Skuibakken was opened in 1928. It is owned by Bærums Skiklub. The first major rebuilding began in the autumn of 1938. By the end of the 1950s, it was considered to build a modern ski slope. The facilities are largely the result of renovations in 1962-63 and partly in the early 1970s. It hosted two FIS Ski jumping World Cup events in 1981 and 1983. Former ski jumper Paal Hansen holds the ski slope record from 1996.

== World Cup ==
Date	Size	Winner	Second	Third
17 Mar 1981	K-105	(Canada) Horst Bulau	(Austria) Armin Kogler	(Norway) Roger Ruud
11 Mar 1983	K-110	(Austria) Armin Kogler	(Norway) Olav Hansson	(Canada) Horst Bulau
