= Yllätysten yö =

Studio album by Matti Nykänen
- Released: February 1992
- Recorded: 1991
- Studio: Studio Kaktus (Jyväskylä)
- Genre: Synth-pop; eurodance; pop rock; comedy rock; hard rock
- Length: 26:22
- Language: Finnish
- Label: Audiovox
- Producer: Risto Kalle Närhi

Matti Nykänen chronology
Yllätysten yö (1992)	Samurai (1993)

Singles from Yllätysten yö
- 1. "V-tyyli" Released: 1992

Yllätysten yö (English: "Night of Surprises") is the debut studio album by Matti Nykänen, released by Audiovox Records in 1992. The album reached number 16 on the Official Finnish Charts, and remained there for 8 weeks. The album was certified gold in Finland, with 25,000 copies sold. The only single from the album, "V-tyyli", was released the same year.

The album was reissued and remastered on CD in 2006, along with Samurai.

== Track listing ==
Side one
No.	Title	Writer(s)	Length
1.	"Topless (cover of Crazy by Mud)"	Nicky Chinn/Mike Chapman/Vexi Salmi/Guzetti/J. Niemi	3:02
2.	"Samaa nauhaa"	V. Majakoski	3:06
3.	"V-tyyli"	Guzetti	3:35
4.	"Mennään tanssimaan"	Majakoski	2:30

Side two
No.	Title	Writer(s)	Length
5.	"Yllätysten yö"	Ensio Käämi	2:55
6.	"Kingi"	J. Niemi	2:12
7.	"Pidä varas"	Majakoski	3:22
8.	"Jos sä haluut"	Majakoski	2:45
9.	"Vain mäkimies voi tietää sen"	Majakoski	4:15
Total length:			26:22

== Personnel ==
- Matti Nykänen - lead vocals
- Jussi Niemi - guitar, backing vocals
- Samu Nummela - bass, backing vocals
- Jani Juvonen - drums

Production

- Theodor Wickmann - cover
- Risto Kalle Närhi - mixing, production, arrangement, (1, 2, 4, 5, 6, 8)
- Mika Jussila - LP-engraving
- O. Heater - arrangement (3, 7, 9)
- Jussi Niemi - mixing, arrangement (1, 2, 4, 5, 6, 8)
- V. Huttunen - arrangement (4, 8)
- Leninki - arrangement (7)
- Sallap Ky - publisher

== Charts ==
Weekly chart performance for Yllätysten yö
Chart (1992)	Peak position
Finnish Albums (Suomen virallinen lista)	16
