= Matti Nykänen =

Finnish ski jumper (1963–2019)

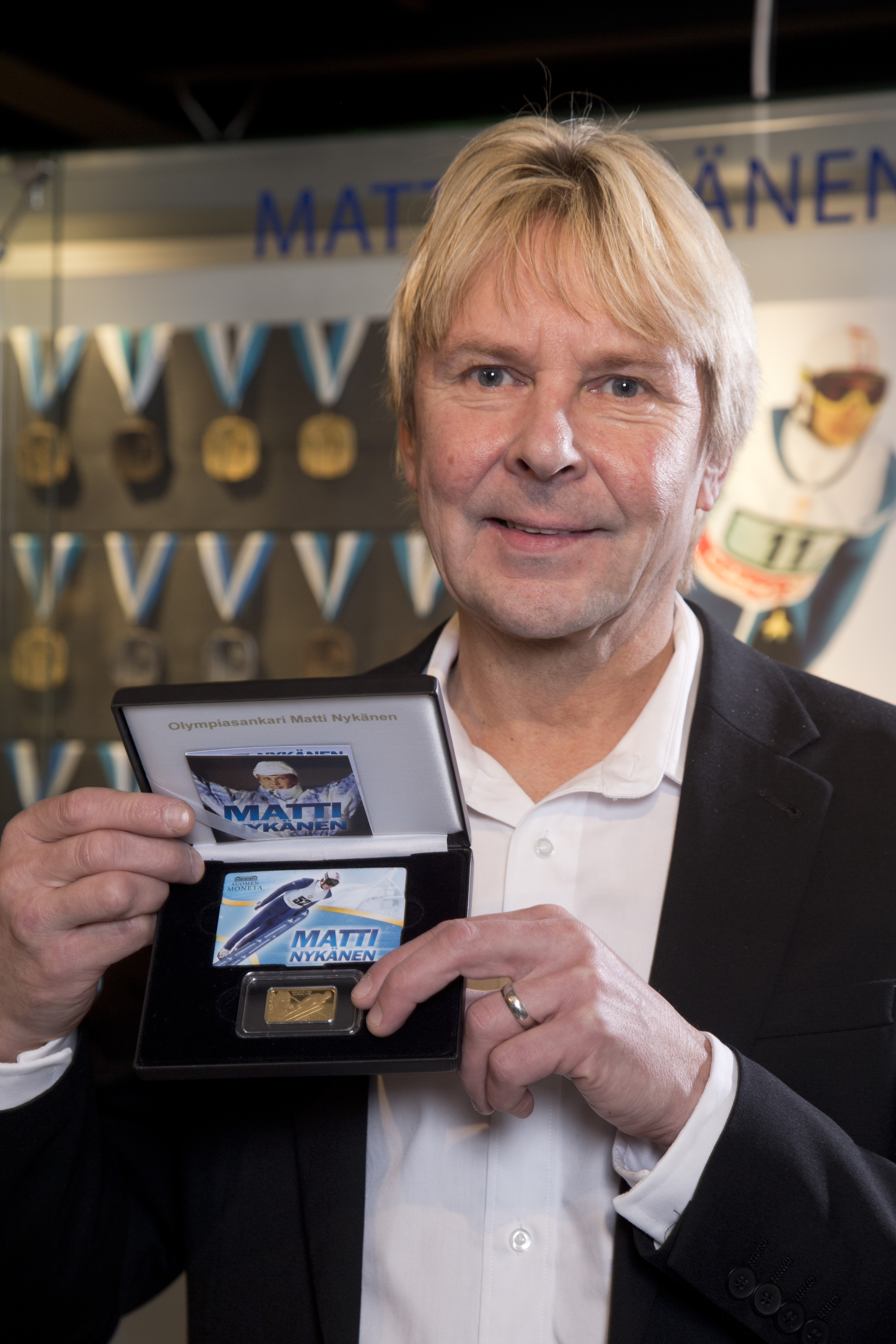
- Nykänen in January 2014

Personal information
- Full name: Matti Ensio Nykänen
- Nationality: Finland
- Born: 17 July 1963 Jyväskylä, Finland
- Died: 4 February 2019 (aged 55) Lappeenranta, Finland
- Height: 1.74 m (5 ft 8 1/2 in)

Sport
- Sport: Skiing

World Cup career
- Seasons: 1981–1991
- Indiv. starts: 130
- Indiv. podiums: 76
- Indiv. wins: 46
- Overall titles: 4 (1983, 1985, 1986, 1988)
- Four Hills titles: 2 (1983, 1988)

Achievements and titles
- Personal bests: 191 m (627 ft); Planica, 15 March 1985
Medal record
Men's ski jumping
Olympic Games
| Gold medal – first place | 1984 Sarajevo | Individual LH |
| Gold medal – first place | 1988 Calgary | Individual NH |
| Gold medal – first place | 1988 Calgary | Individual LH |
| Gold medal – first place | 1988 Calgary | Team LH |
| Silver medal – second place | 1984 Sarajevo | Individual NH |
Ski Jumping World Championships
| Gold medal – first place | 1982 Oslo | Individual LH |
| Gold medal – first place | 1984 Engelberg | Team LH |
| Gold medal – first place | 1985 Seefeld | Team LH |
| Gold medal – first place | 1987 Oberstdorf | Team LH |
| Gold medal – first place | 1989 Lahti | Team LH |
| Silver medal – second place | 1987 Oberstdorf | Individual NH |
| Bronze medal – third place | 1982 Oslo | Team LH |
| Bronze medal – third place | 1985 Seefeld | Individual LH |
| Bronze medal – third place | 1989 Lahti | Individual LH |
Men's ski flying
Ski Flying World Championships
| Gold medal – first place | 1985 Planica | Individual |
| Silver medal – second place | 1990 Vikersund | Individual |
| Bronze medal – third place | 1983 Harrachov | Individual |
| Bronze medal – third place | 1986 Bad Mitterndorf | Individual |
| Bronze medal – third place | 1988 Oberstdorf | Individual |
Junior World Championships
| Gold medal – first place | 1981 Schonach | Individual NH |
- Updated on 10 February 2016

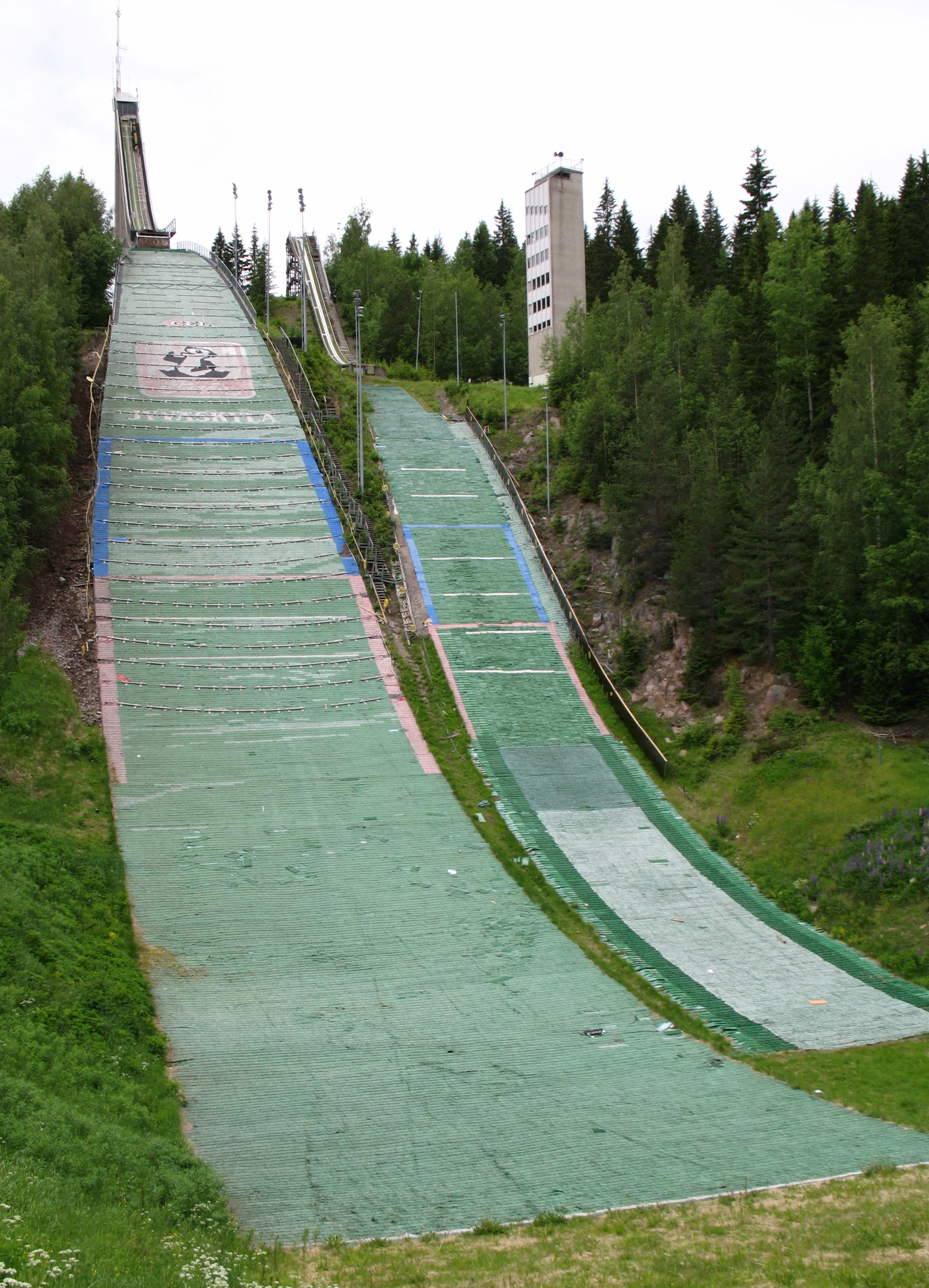
The longest jump at the ski jumping stadium in Laajavuori, Jyväskylä is called Matti Nykänen Hill (previously called Laajavuori Ski Jump Hill)

Matti Ensio Nykänen (pronounced [ˈmɑtːi ˈnykænen]; 17 July 1963 – 4 February 2019) was a Finnish ski jumper who competed from 1981 to 1991. Known as "The Flying Finn", he is one of the most successful ski jumpers of all time, having won five Winter Olympic medals (four gold), nine World Championship medals (five gold), and 22 Finnish Championship medals (14 gold). Most notably, he won three gold medals at the 1988 Winter Olympics, becoming, along with Yvonne van Gennip of the Netherlands, the most medaled athlete that winter.

Nykänen is one of only two ski jumpers in history – the other being Domen Prevc – to have won all five of the sport's major individual titles: a gold medal at the Winter Olympics (three times), the Ski Jumping World Championships (once), the Ski Flying World Championships (once), four World Cup overall titles, and the Four Hills Tournament (twice). His four World Cup titles is an all-time male record shared with Adam Małysz. Nykänen remains the only male five-time ski flying world record holder in history.

From the 1990s onwards, Nykänen's status as a celebrity was mainly fueled by his personal relationships, his career as a pop singer, and various incidents often related to heavy use of alcohol and violent behaviour. He was sentenced to 26 months in prison following a stabbing incident in 2004, and again for 16 months following an aggravated assault on his wife in 2009. He died in 2019 at the age of 55, suffering from chronic pancreatitis.

== Ski jumping career ==
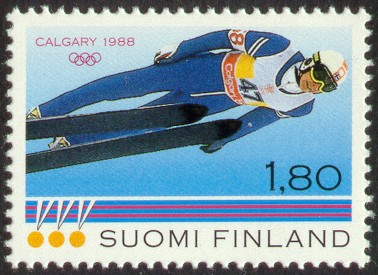
Nykänen on a postage stamp

For most of the 1980s, Nykänen and Jens Weißflog of East Germany dominated the sport. Nykänen won gold and silver at the 1984 Winter Olympics in Sarajevo. His 17.5-point gold medal victory was the largest margin of victory in Olympic ski jumping history at the time. He was also the first ever to win gold medals on both hills at the 1988 Winter Olympics in Calgary.

In 1985 he flew 191 metres in Planica, a world record that stood briefly until Piotr Fijas (Poland) flew 194 metres, again in Planica, in 1987. His other achievements include a total of nine medals (five golds) at the World Championship level. He also won a total of 46 World Cup competitions (later surpassed by the current record-holder Gregor Schlierenzauer, Austria) and won the overall title four times (also a record, currently shared with Adam Małysz of Poland).

He won the prestigious Four Hills Tournament twice. He competed in the FIS Ski Flying World Championships five times and won a medal every time. Nykänen also won the ski jumping competition at the Holmenkollen Ski Festival twice (1982, 1985). In 1987, Nykänen was awarded the Holmenkollen Medal (shared with Hermann Weinbuch).

On 28 February 2008, he won the International Masters Championship for veteran ski jumpers.

=== The only one with five world records ===
On 16 March 1984, he set ski jumping world distance record on official training twice at 182 metres (597 ft). And on the next day at 185 metres (607 ft), all three in Oberstdorf, West Germany.

On 15 March 1985, he set two ski jumping world distance records on official training at 187 metres (614 ft) and at 191 metres (627 ft), both of them on Velikanka bratov Gorišek in Planica, Yugoslavia.

== Olympic Games ==
=== Standings ===
| Event | Normal hill | Large hill | Team |
|---|---|---|---|
| (Socialist Federal Republic of Yugoslavia) 1984 Sarajevo | Silver | Gold | N/A |
| (Canada) 1988 Calgary | Gold | Gold | Gold |

== World Cup ==
=== Standings ===
| Season | Overall | 4H | SF |
|---|---|---|---|
| 1980/81 | 26 | — | N/A |
| 1981/82 | 4 | 11 | N/A |
| 1982/83 | 1st place, gold medalist(s) | 1st place, gold medalist(s) | N/A |
| 1983/84 | 2nd place, silver medalist(s) | 3rd place, bronze medalist(s) | N/A |
| 1984/85 | 1st place, gold medalist(s) | 2nd place, silver medalist(s) | N/A |
| 1985/86 | 1st place, gold medalist(s) | — | N/A |
| 1986/87 | 6 | 65 | N/A |
| 1987/88 | 1st place, gold medalist(s) | 1st place, gold medalist(s) | N/A |
| 1988/89 | 9 | 2nd place, silver medalist(s) | N/A |
| 1989/90 | 19 | 16 | N/A |
| 1990/91 | — | — | — |

=== Wins ===
| No. | Season | Date | Location | Hill | Size |
|---|---|---|---|---|---|
| 1 | 1981/82 | 30 December 1981 | (West Germany) Oberstdorf | Schattenbergschanze K110 | LH |
| 2 | 1981/82 | 28 February 1982 | (Norway) Oslo (WCS) | Holmenkollbakken K105 | LH |
| 3 | 1981/82 | 12 March 1982 | (Austria) Tauplitz/Bad Mitterndorf | Kulm K165 | FH |
| 4 | 1982/83 | 18 December 1982 | (Italy) Cortina d’Ampezzo | Trampolino Italia K92 | NH |
| 5 | 1982/83 | 4 January 1983 | (Austria) Innsbruck | Bergiselschanze K104 | LH |
| 6 | 1982/83 | 15 January 1983 | (United States) Lake Placid | MacKenzie Intervale K114 | LH |
| 7 | 1982/83 | 16 January 1983 | (United States) Lake Placid | MacKenzie Intervale K114 | LH |
| 8 | 1982/83 | 23 January 1983 | (Canada) Thunder Bay | Big Thunder K120 | LH |
| 9 | 1982/83 | 18 February 1983 | (Norway) Vikersund | Vikersundbakken K155 | FH |
| 10 | 1982/83 | 19 February 1983 | (Norway) Vikersund | Vikersundbakken K155 | FH |
| 11 | 1982/83 | 20 February 1983 | (Norway) Vikersund | Vikersundbakken K155 | FH |
| 12 | 1982/83 | 27 February 1983 | (Sweden) Falun | Lugnet K112 | LH |
| 13 | 1982/83 | 26 March 1983 | (Socialist Federal Republic of Yugoslavia) Planica | Srednja Bloudkova K90 | NH |
| 14 | 1983/84 | 18 February 1984 | (Socialist Federal Republic of Yugoslavia) Sarajevo (OWG) | Igman K112 | LH |
| 15 | 1983/84 | 2 March 1984 | (Finland) Lahti | Salpausselkä K88 | NH |
| 16 | 1983/84 | 4 March 1984 | (Finland) Lahti | Salpausselkä K113 | LH |
| 17 | 1983/84 | 17 March 1984 | (West Germany) Oberstdorf | Heini-Klopfer-Skiflugschanze K182 | FH |
| 18 | 1983/84 | 18 March 1984 | (West Germany) Oberstdorf | Heini-Klopfer-Skiflugschanze K182 | FH |
| 19 | 1984/85 | 4 January 1985 | (Austria) Innsbruck | Bergiselschanze K109 | LH |
| 20 | 1984/85 | 9 February 1985 | (Japan) Sapporo | Miyanomori K90 | NH |
| 21 | 1984/85 | 1 March 1985 | (Finland) Lahti | Salpausselkä K88 | NH |
| 22 | 1984/85 | 10 March 1985 | (Norway) Oslo | Holmenkollbakken K105 | LH |
| 23 | 1984/85 | 23 March 1985 | (Czechoslovakia) Štrbské Pleso | MS 1970 B K88 | NH |
| 24 | 1984/85 | 24 March 1985 | (Czechoslovakia) Štrbské Pleso | MS 1970 A K114 | LH |
| 25 | 1985/86 | 11 January 1986 | (Czechoslovakia) Harrachov | Čerťák K120 | LH |
| 26 | 1985/86 | 17 January 1986 | (East Germany) Klingenthal | Aschbergschanze K102 | LH |
| 27 | 1985/86 | 25 January 1986 | (Japan) Sapporo | Miyanomori K90 | NH |
| 28 | 1985/86 | 26 January 1986 | (Japan) Sapporo | Ōkurayama K112 | LH |
| 29 | 1985/86 | 1 March 1986 | (Finland) Lahti | Salpausselkä K90 | NH |
| 30 | 1985/86 | 2 March 1986 | (Finland) Lahti | Salpausselkä K113 | LH |
| 31 | 1985/86 | 22 March 1986 | (Socialist Federal Republic of Yugoslavia) Planica | Srednja Bloudkova K90 | NH |
| 32 | 1986/87 | 7 December 1986 | (Canada) Thunder Bay | Big Thunder K120 | LH |
| 33 | 1986/87 | 1 March 1987 | (Finland) Lahti | Salpausselkä K88 | NH |
| 34 | 1986/87 | 8 March 1987 | (Sweden) Falun | Lugnet K112 | LH |
| 35 | 1987/88 | 5 December 1987 | (Canada) Thunder Bay | Big Thunder K89 | NH |
| 36 | 1987/88 | 6 December 1987 | (Canada) Thunder Bay | Big Thunder K120 | LH |
| 37 | 1987/88 | 19 December 1987 | (Japan) Sapporo | Miyanomori K90 | NH |
| 38 | 1987/88 | 20 December 1987 | (Japan) Sapporo | Ōkurayama K115 | LH |
| 39 | 1987/88 | 1 January 1988 | (West Germany) Garmisch-Partenkirchen | Große Olympiaschanze K107 | LH |
| 40 | 1987/88 | 4 January 1988 | (Austria) Innsbruck | Bergiselschanze K109 | LH |
| 41 | 1987/88 | 6 January 1988 | (Austria) Bischofshofen | Paul-Ausserleitner-Schanze K111 | LH |
| 42 | 1987/88 | 20 January 1988 | (Switzerland) St. Moritz | Olympiaschanze K94 | NH |
| 43 | 1987/88 | 4 March 1988 | (Finland) Lahti | Salpausselkä K90 | NH |
| 44 | 1987/88 | 6 March 1988 | (Finland) Lahti | Salpausselkä K114 | LH |
| 45 | 1988/89 | 17 December 1988 | (Japan) Sapporo | Miyanomori K90 | NH |
| 46 | 1988/89 | 1 January 1989 | (West Germany) Garmisch-Partenkirchen | Große Olympiaschanze K107 | LH |

== Ski jumping world records ==
He set five world records in total, the most of any ski jumper in history.

| Date | Hill | Location | Metres | Feet |
|---|---|---|---|---|
| 16 March 1984 | Heini-Klopfer-Skiflugschanze K182 | Oberstdorf, West Germany | 182 | 597 |
| 16 March 1984 | Heini-Klopfer-Skiflugschanze K182 | Oberstdorf, West Germany | 182 | 597 |
| 17 March 1984 | Heini-Klopfer-Skiflugschanze K182 | Oberstdorf, West Germany | 185 | 607 |
| 15 March 1985 | Velikanka bratov Gorišek K185 | Planica, Yugoslavia | 187 | 614 |
| 15 March 1985 | Velikanka bratov Gorišek K185 | Planica, Yugoslavia | 191 | 627 |

== Personal life ==
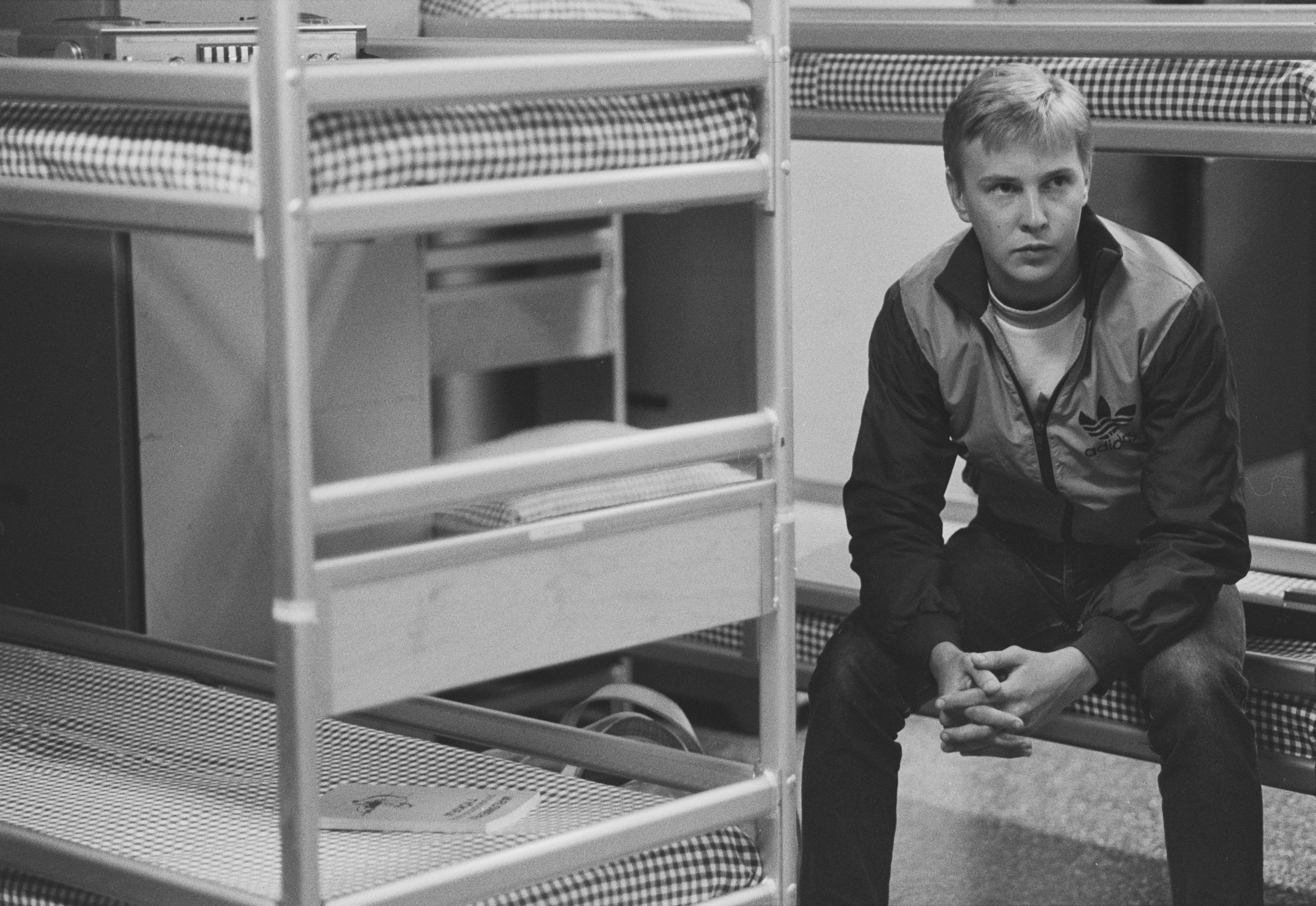
Matti Nykänen in Finnish military service, 1984

Nykänen was married six times:

- Tiina Hassinen (1986–1988), one son
- Pia Hynninen (1989–1991), one daughter
- Sari Paanala (1996–1998) (Nykänen changed his surname to Paanala during this marriage)
- Mervi Tapola (2001–2003, remarried 2004–2010)
- Pia Talonpoika (2014– his death)

=== Relationship with Mervi Tapola ===
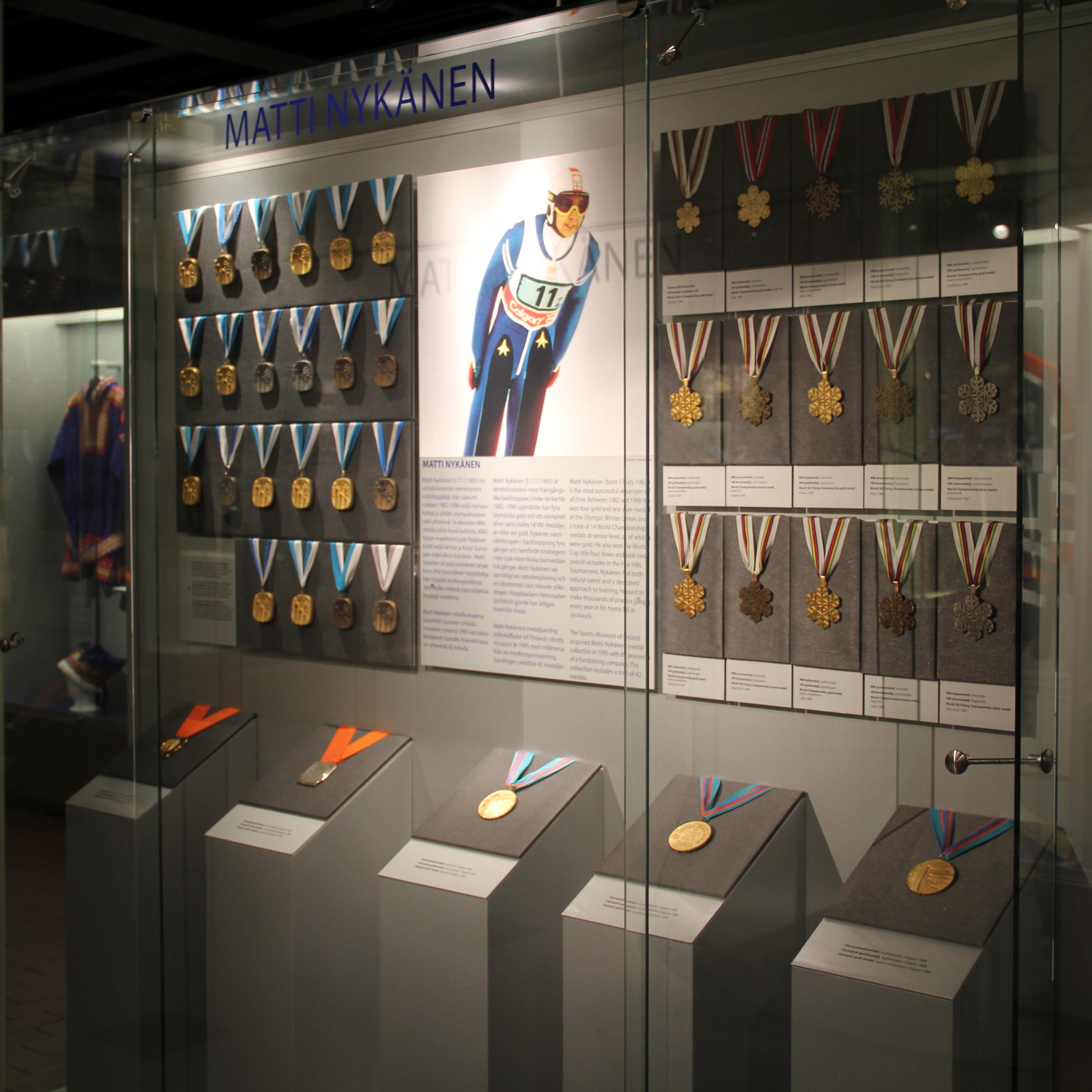
Matti Nykänen's Olympic, World Championship and Finnish Medals at the Sports Museum. The collection is owned by the Finnish Sports Museum Foundation

Nykänen met millionaire “sausage heiress” Mervi Tapola (1954–2019) in 1999, and they were married from 2001 to 2003. They got divorced in 2003 and remarried again in 2004. The marriage was tempestuous and gave rise to many well-publicised incidents: The first reported assault against Tapola occurred in June 2000, following a restraining order that was imposed upon Nykänen. In 2004, Nykänen was handed a suspended sentence for assaulting Tapola again. Nykänen had already been accused of assaulting Tapola in 2001, but the charges were withdrawn because Tapola exercised her right to remain silent.

In September 2005, while on probation for another assault, Nykänen was re-arrested four days after his release for abusing his partner again. Nykänen was convicted and imprisoned for four months on 16 March 2006. Soon after his release, he stabbed a man in a pizza restaurant in Korpilahti. In the summer of 2009, Tapola (then Tapola-Nykänen) petitioned for divorce a 14th time, but cancelled it.

On Christmas Day 2009, Nykänen allegedly injured his wife with a knife and tried to throttle her with a bathrobe belt. He was charged with attempted manslaughter and held in custody by Tampere police, but was released on 28 December after charges were dropped for insufficient evidence. On 24 August 2010, Nykänen was convicted of grievous bodily harm and sentenced to 16 months in prison and ordered to pay €5,000 in compensation to his wife for pain and emotional suffering and €3,000 for legal expenses. In August 2010, Tapola made a 15th request for divorce.

=== Assault incident ===
On 24 August 2004, Nykänen was arrested on suspicion of attempted manslaughter of a family friend after losing a finger pulling competition in Tottijärvi, Nokia. In October 2004, he was found guilty of aggravated assault, and sentenced to 26 months in prison. As it was a first offence, he was released in September 2005.

=== As an entertainer ===
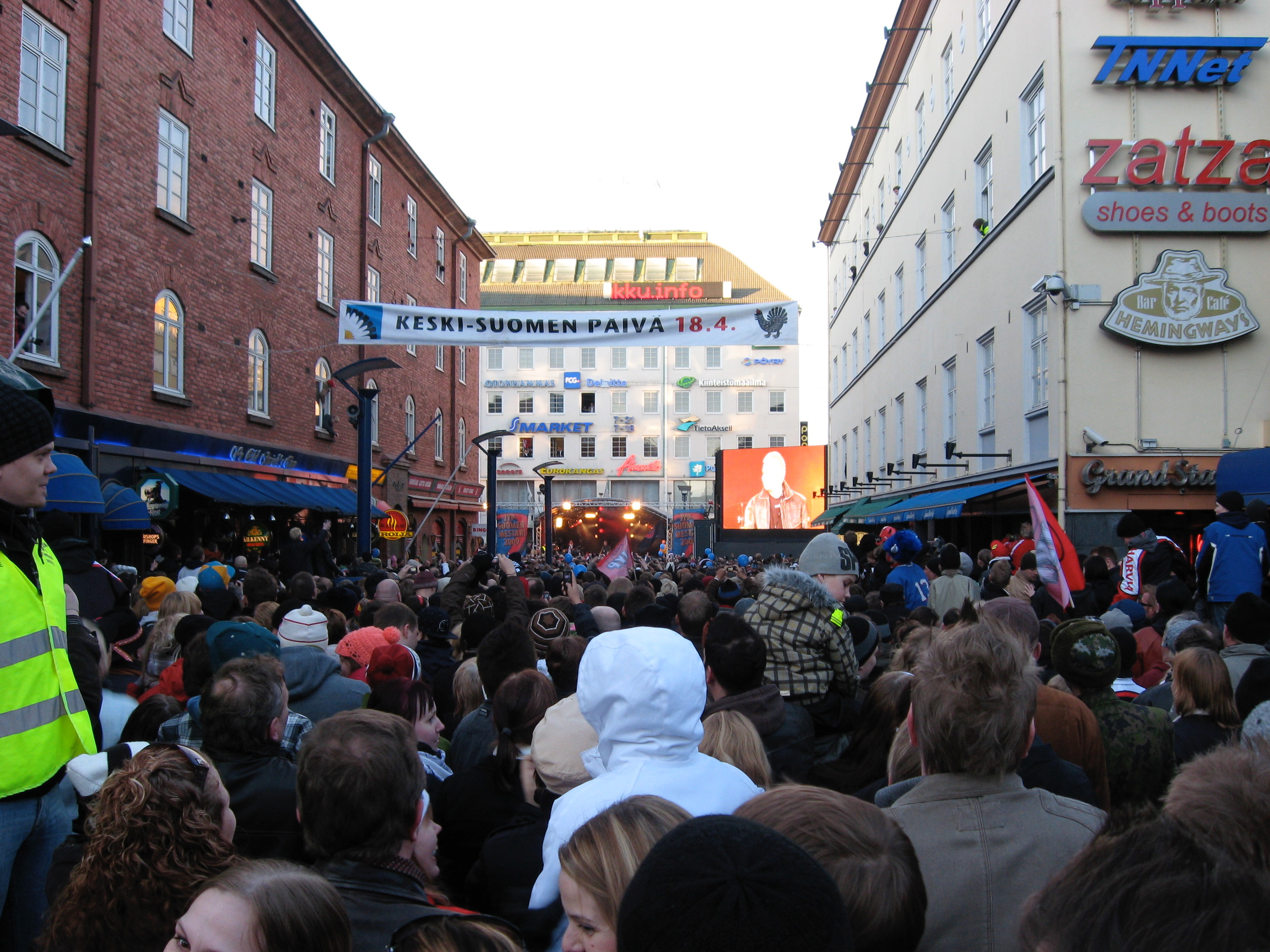
Matti Nykänen performs in Jyväskylä after JYP won the 2009 Finnish ice hockey championship

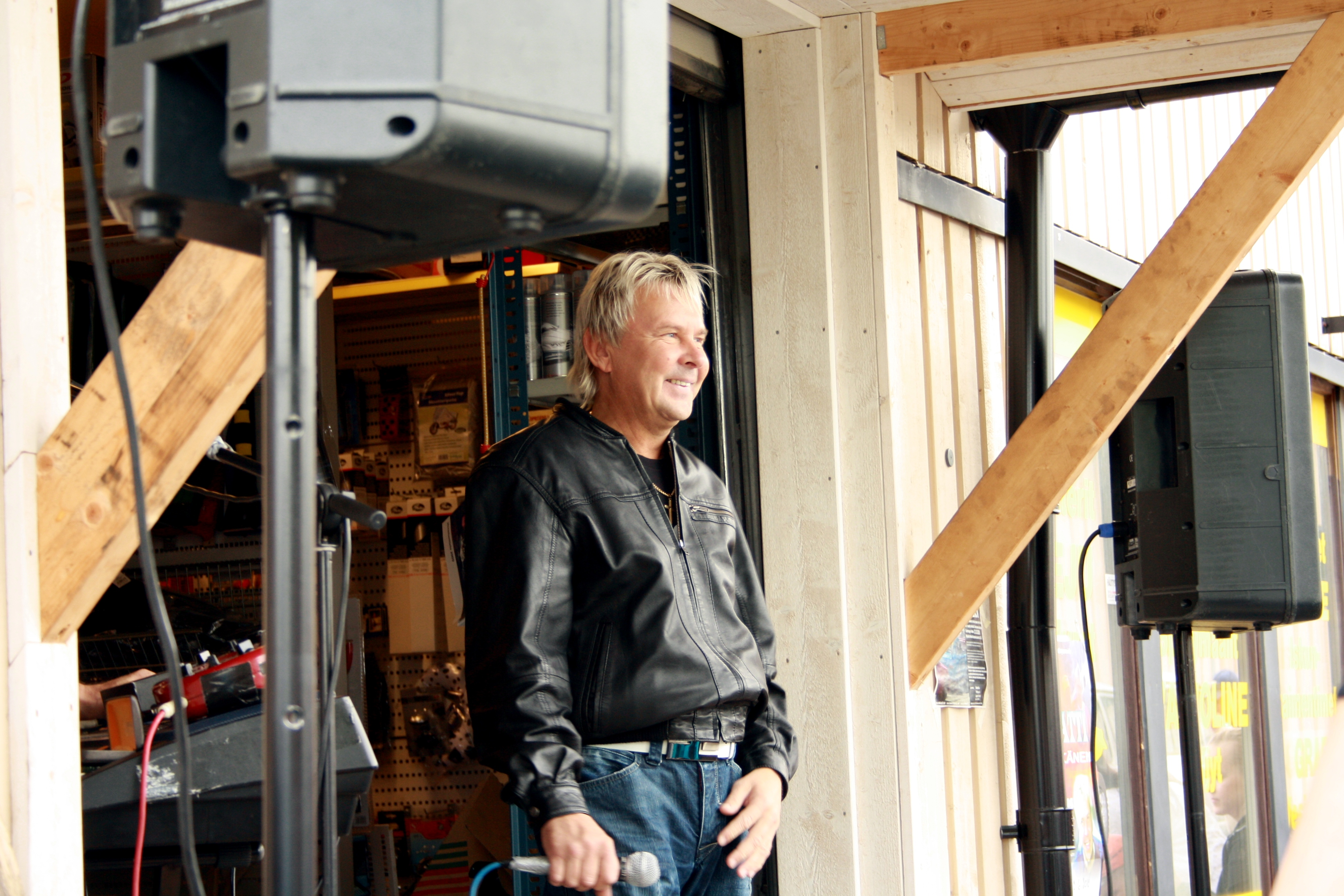
Nykänen performing in 2010

When Nykänen's ski jumping career was drawing to a close, a group of businessmen proposed to make him a singer. His debut studio album Yllätysten yö was released in 1992 and sold over 25,000 copies. Nykänen became the second Olympic gold medalist after Tapio Rautavaara to be awarded a golden record in Finland. His next album Samurai (1993), was not as successful.

At the end of the 1990s, due to serious financial problems, Nykänen worked as a stripper in a Järvenpää restaurant. The restaurateur was reproached for the exploitation of Nykänen.

In 2002, Nykänen made a comeback as a singer and released the single "Ehkä otin, ehkä en" ("Maybe I took [it], maybe I didn't"). He also gave his name to a cider brand with the same advertisement slogan. In 2006 Nykänen released his third studio album Ehkä otin, ehkä en (Maybe I took it, maybe I didn't). During most of his musical career, Nykänen worked with professional musician Jussi Niemi. Nykänen toured Finland performing two to three times a week with the Samurai ensemble led by Niemi.

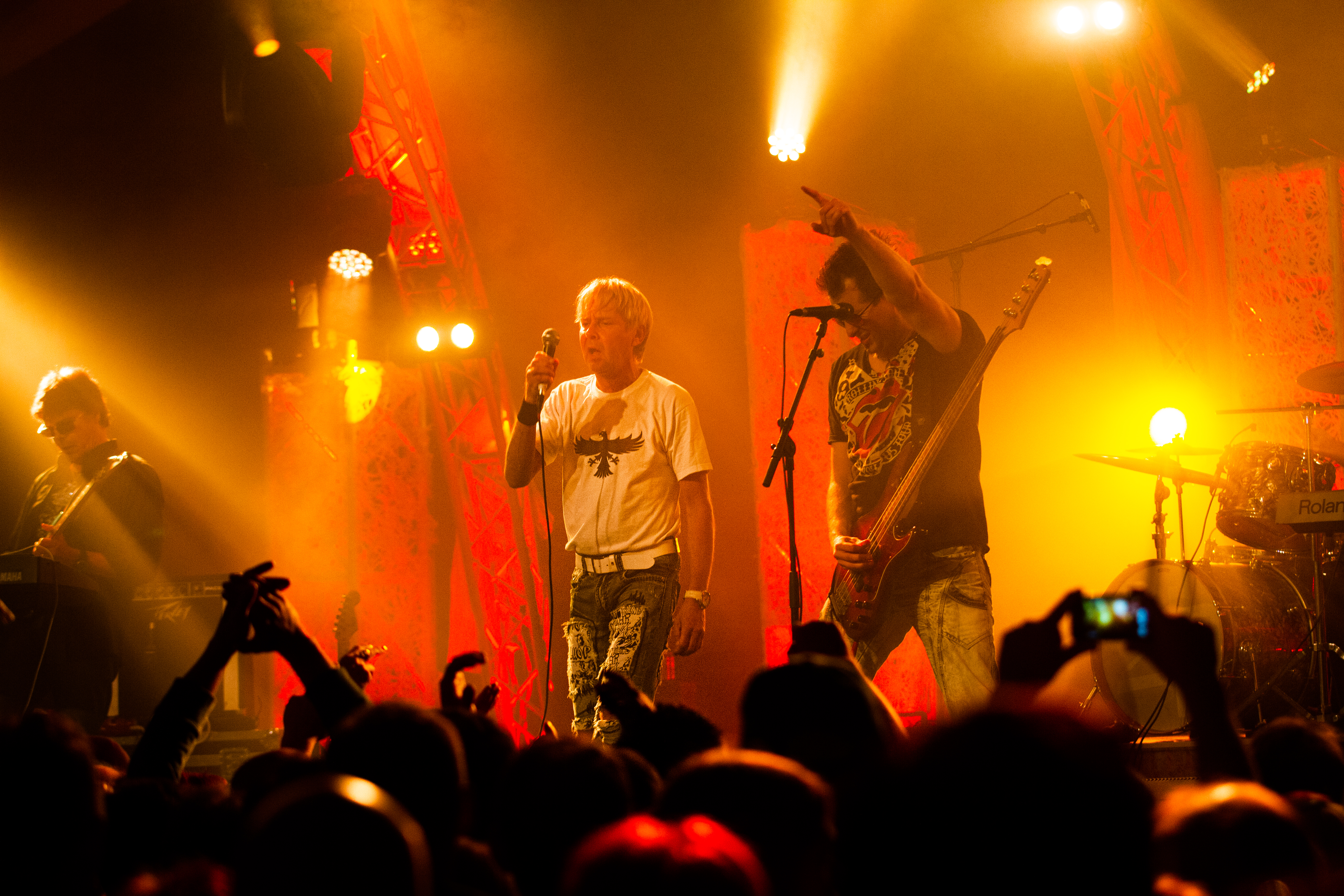
Matti Nykänen at the Kiuruvesi music event in 2013

Many of Nykänen's singles were named after some (in)famous quotes by Nykänen, such as Elämä on laiffii ("Life is life"), Jokainen tsäänssi on mahdollisuus ("Every chance is a possibility"), and Ehkä otin, ehkä en.

In November 2009, Nykänen began to present his own cooking web series Mattihan se sopan keitti (Matti cooked the soup).

=== ADHD diagnosis ===
In the early 2000s, Nykänen was diagnosed with attention deficit hyperactivity disorder.

== Death ==
Matti Nykänen died at his home in Lappeenranta, shortly after midnight on 4 February 2019, from a sudden illness, at the age of 55. He had complained of dizziness and nausea earlier that night. He had been diagnosed with diabetes less than three months earlier. The news of his death was widely reported by the media both in Finland and abroad, with many tributes also paid to him by fellow ski jumpers of his time. He was survived by his fifth wife and three children, two from previous relationships and one outside of marriage. In May 2019 Nykänen's sisters confirmed that the cause of death was pancreatitis and pneumonia.

== In popular culture ==
- In 1988, DPR Korea issued a postage stamp depicting Nykänen in flight during competition.
- In 2016, Swedish actor Edvin Endre portrayed Nykänen, in the British biographical sports film Eddie the Eagle.

== Discography ==
- Yllätysten yö (1992)
- Samurai (1993)
- Ehkä otin, ehkä en (2006)

== Biographies ==
- A film about the life of Nykänen, simply entitled Matti, was released in 2006 with Finnish actor Jasper Pääkkönen cast as Nykänen. The movie focused on Nykänen's exploits beyond ski jumping.

== Books ==
- Matti Nykänen, Päivi Ainasoja and Manu Syrjänen: Mattihan se sopan keitti (2007)
- Juha-Veli Jokinen: Missä me ollaan ja oonko mäkin siellä (2007)
- Juha-Veli Jokinen: Elämä on laiffii (2006)
- Kai Merilä: Matin ja minun rankka reissu (2005)
- Egon Theiner: Grüsse aus der Hölle (2004) (the English version of the book Greetings from Hell was published in January 2006)
- Antero Kujala: Voittohyppy (1999)
- Antti Arve: Matti Nykänen Maailman paras (1988)
- Kari Kyheröinen and Hannu Miettinen: Takalaudasta täysillä: Matti Nykäsen tie maailmanhuipulle (1984)
- Juha-Veli Jokinen: Myötä- ja vastamäessä (2010)

== See also ==
- Matti Pulli
