= Arnholdt Kongsgård =

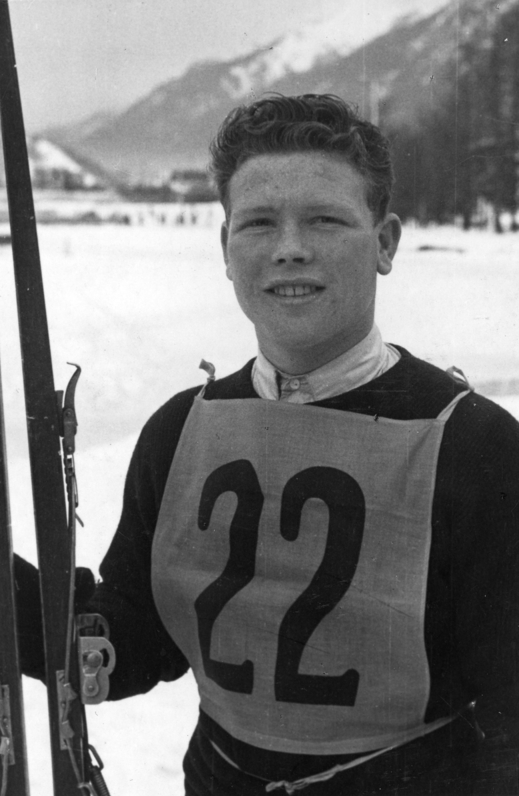

Personal information
- Born: 23 November 1914
- Died: 22 January 1991 (aged 76)

Sport
- Sport: Ski jumping
Medal record
Men's ski jumping
World Championships
Bronze medal – third place	1939 Zakopane	Large hill

Arnholdt Kongsgård (23 November 1914 – 22 January 1991) was a Norwegian ski jumper who competed before World War II. He won a ski jumping bronze medal at the 1939 World Ski Championships in Zakopane. He had previously finished sixth at the 1938 World Ski Championships and eighth at the 1936 Winter Olympics.

Kongsgård was the second record holder of Vikersundbakken, holding the hill record from 1946 to 1951.

He represented the club Kongsberg IF.
