= Markku Pusenius =

Finnish ski jumper (born 1964)

Medal record

Men's ski jumping

Representing Finland

World Championships
Gold medal – first place	1984 Engelberg	Team large hill

Markku Sakari Pusenius (born 29 May 1964 in Lahti) is a Finnish former ski jumper who competed from 1981 to 1986. He won a gold medal in the team large hill at the 1984 FIS Nordic World Ski Championships in Engelberg. Pusenius's best individual finish was second twice (1982, 1983). He also competed at the 1984 Winter Olympics.
