= Ole Bremseth =

Norwegian former ski jumper

Personal information
- Nationality: Norway
- Born: 2 January 1961 (age 65) Hokksund, Norway

Sport
- Sport: Skiing

World Cup career
- Seasons: 1980–1983; 1986
- Indiv. starts: 45
- Indiv. podiums: 12
- Indiv. wins: 6
Medal record
Men's ski jumping
FIS Nordic World Ski Championships
Gold medal – first place	1982 Oslo	Team LH
Bronze medal – third place	1982 Oslo	Individual NH
- Updated on 10 February 2016

Ole Bremseth (born 2 January 1961) is a Norwegian former ski jumper.

== Career ==
At the 1982 FIS Nordic World Ski Championships in Oslo, Bremseth won a bronze medal in the individual normal hill and a gold medal in the team large hill. He has six World Cup victories (all in 1982) with the first one in Lahti and the final one in Planica.

== World Cup ==
=== Standings ===
Season	Overall	4H
1979/80	—	71
1980/81	12	—
1981/82	5	16
1982/83	8	9
1985-86	55	—

=== Wins ===
No.	Season	Date	Location	Hill	Size
1	1981/82	4 March 1982	(Finland) Lahti	Salpausselkä K88	NH
2	1981/82	7 March 1982	(Finland) Lahti	Salpausselkä K88	NH
3	1981/82	19 March 1982	(Czechoslovakia) Štrbské Pleso	MS 1970 A K110	LH
4	1981/82	20 March 1982	(Czechoslovakia) Štrbské Pleso	MS 1970 B K88	NH
5	1981/82	27 March 1982	(Socialist Federal Republic of Yugoslavia) Planica	Srednja Bloudkova K90	NH
6	1981/82	28 March 1982	(Socialist Federal Republic of Yugoslavia) Planica	Bloudkova velikanka K120	LH
