= Steinar Bråten =

Norwegian ski jumper and coach

Personal information
- Nationality: Norway
- Born: 17 September 1962 (age 64) Drangedal Municipality, Norway
- Height: 1.81 m (5 ft 11 1/2 in)

Sport
- Sport: Skiing

World Cup career
- Seasons: 1983–1985; 1987–1988
- Indiv. starts: 27
- Indiv. podiums: 4
- Indiv. wins: 1
- Updated on 10 February 2016

Steinar Bråten (born 17 September 1962) is a Norwegian former ski jumper.

== Career ==
He had 27 participations in the World Cup between 1982 and 1988 with four podium positions and one victory, the latter in Holmenkollen in 1983. His only Olympic participation was in the 1984 Winter Olympics.

After his active career Bråten has worked as a coach for the national ski jumping team and is currently working at the Norwegian University of Science and Technology and Olympiatoppen where he conducts research related to technical jumping.

== World Cup ==
=== Standings ===
Season	Overall	4H
1982/83	6	5
1983/84	44	47
1984/85	43	—
1986/87	21	—
1987/88	71	—

=== Wins ===
No.	Season	Date	Location	Hill	Size
1	1982/83	13 March 1983	(Norway) Oslo	Holmenkollbakken K105	LH
