= Halvor Asphol =

Norwegian ski jumper

Personal information
- Full name: Halvor Asphol
- Born: 1961 (age 64–65)

Sport
- Sport: Skiing
- Club: Kleive IL

World Cup career
- Seasons: 1980–1982; 1984
- Indiv. podiums: 1
- Updated on 30 Mar 2015

Halvor Asphol (born 15 June 1961) is a Norwegian former ski jumper. He placed second in a world-cup event on 6 January 1982.
