= Massimo Rigoni =

Italian ski jumper

Personal information
- Full name: Massimo Rigoni
- Born: 24 November 1961 (age 64) Asiago, Italy

Sport
- Sport: Skiing

World Cup career
- Seasons: 1980–1987
- Indiv. podiums: 5
- Updated on 30 Mar 2015

Massimo Rigoni (24 November 1961 in Asiago) is an Italian former ski jumper. He competed at the 1984 Winter Olympics.
