= FIS Ski Flying World Championships 1990 =

1990 edition of the FIS Ski-Flying World Championships

The FIS Ski Flying World Ski Championships 1990 took place on 25 February 1990 in Vikersund, Norway for the second time. Vikersund hosted the championships previously in 1977. The two best of three jumps counted. After a failed first round with 134 metres, Dieter Thoma won the title by producing a joint hill record 171 metres jump in the second and 165 metres in the third.

== Individual ==
25 February 1990

Medal	Athlete	Points
Gold	Dieter Thoma (FRG)	357.7
Silver	Matti Nykänen (FIN)	350.8
Bronze	Jens Weißflog (GDR)	349.3

== Medal table ==
Rank	Nation	Gold	Silver	Bronze	Total
1	West Germany (FRG)	1	0	0	1
2	Finland (FIN)	0	1	0	1
3	East Germany (GDR)	0	0	1	1
Totals (3 entries)		1	1	1	3
