= Christoffer Selbekk =

Norwegian businessperson and ski jumper

Christoffer Selbekk (26 May 1939 – 11 January 2012) was a Norwegian businessperson and ski jumper.

As a ski jumper he finished fifth in the normal hill event at the 1966 World Championships. He was on the national team from 1963 to 1967. He has later held posts in the Norwegian Skiing Association and the Norwegian Golf Federation.

He completed a degree in economics at the University of Denver in 1962. He was the CEO of the company Tretorn Norge from 1974 to 1978 and of his own company, Chrisco Sport, from 1978. He resided in Eiksmarka. He died in January 2012.
