= Richard Schallert =

Austrian ski jumper

Medal record

Men's ski jumping

Representing Austria

World Championships
Bronze medal – third place	1987 Oberstdorf	Team large hill

Richard Schallert (born 21 April 1964 in Brand in Vorarlberg) is an Austrian former ski jumper who competed from 1982 to 1988.

He won a bronze medal in the team large hill event at the 1987 FIS Nordic World Ski Championships in Oberstdorf. Schallert finished 5th in the FIS Ski-Flying World Championships 1983 and had his best individual career finish of 2nd in the normal hill in Strbske Pleso in 1985.

In 1989, he became a coach in the Austrian Ski Federation. In 2006, he took over as national team coach of the Czech Republic
