= Horst Bulau =

Canadian ski jumper

Personal information
- Nationality: Canada
- Born: 14 August 1962 (age 63) Ottawa, Ontario, Canada
- Height: 1.78 m (5 ft 10 in)

Sport
- Sport: Skiing

World Cup career
- Seasons: 1980–1988; 1991–1992
- Indiv. starts: 126
- Indiv. podiums: 29
- Indiv. wins: 13
- Updated on 10 February 2016

Horst Hardy Bulau (born 14 August 1962) is a Canadian former ski jumper who competed for the Canadian national team.

== Career ==
By the end of his career, he had thirteen World Cup wins to his credit, the most by any skier in Canadian history during that time period. He placed in the top three positions in twenty-nine World Cup events, as well as numerous top ten finishes. Bulau earned his thirteen World Cup victories at various hill sizes from 1981 to 1983 when he finished 3rd (1981), 3rd (1982), and 2nd (1983) in the overall World Cup standings. His junior world championship in 1979 was the first Nordic title by a Canadian.

Bulau is a 4-time Olympian, as he participated in the 1980 (Lake Placid, USA), 1984 (Sarajevo, Yugoslavia), 1988 (Calgary, Alberta, Canada) and 1992 (Albertville, France) Winter Olympics. At the 1988 Winter Olympics in Calgary, he placed seventh in the individual large hill event, the best ever performance for a Canadian ski jumper.

Bulau was inducted into the Canadian Olympic Hall of Fame in 1993, inducted into the Canadian Ski Hall of Fame in 1994 and inducted into the Ottawa Sports Hall of Fame in 1998. On October 22, 2014, Horst Bulau was inducted into Canada's Sports Hall of Fame, witnessed by his wife, Kerry, and three children, Kiefer, Zofia and Rainer.

He was raised in Blossom Park in suburban south Ottawa, where his father, Otto (1926-2005), arrived in Canada as a refugee from East Prussia, and settled with his wife Helene (1928-1995) after the war. The Bulaus had four children of whom Horst - the third - was the only son.

In 1978/79 and 1982/83, he was a recipient of the John Semmelink Memorial Award (awarded by the Canadian Amateur Ski Association to the skier who, through sportsmanship, conduct and ability, best represents Canada in international competition). The Sports Federation of Canada named him Athlete of the Month in March 1981, January 1982 and March 1983. At the Tribute of Champions event he was the recipient of an Excellence Award in 1982, 1983 and 1984. On January 18, 1983, he received an Award of Excellence from the provincial government of Ontario. Bulau was also named Canada's outstanding skier twice.

Horst continues to be involved with amateur sport as Special Advisor to Jozo Weider Alpine Race Team, Blue Mountain.

== World Cup ==
=== Standings ===
Season	Overall	4H	SF
1979/80	38	58	N/A
1980/81	3rd place, bronze medalist(s)	10	N/A
1981/82	3rd place, bronze medalist(s)	24	N/A
1982/83	2nd place, silver medalist(s)	3rd place, bronze medalist(s)	N/A
1983/84	8	25	N/A
1984/85	19	11	N/A
1985/86	12	33	N/A
1986/87	47	67	N/A
1987/88	30	17	N/A
1990/91	31	52	—
1991/92	—	74	—

=== Wins ===
No.	Season	Date	Location	Hill	Size
1	1980/81	1 January 1981	(West Germany) Garmisch-Partenkirchen	Große Olympiaschanze K107	LH
2	1980/81	17 March 1981	(Norway) Baerum	Skuibakken K105	LH
3	1981/82	15 January 1982	(Japan) Sapporo	Miyanomori K86	NH
4	1981/82	23 January 1982	(Canada) Thunder Bay	Big Thunder K89	NH
5	1981/82	24 January 1982	(Canada) Thunder Bay	Big Thunder K120	LH
6	1982/83	30 December 1982	(West Germany) Oberstdorf	Schattenbergschanze K110	LH
7	1982/83	22 January 1983	(Canada) Thunder Bay	Big Thunder K89	NH
8	1982/83	26 January 1983	(Switzerland) St. Moritz	Olympiaschanze K94	NH
9	1982/83	28 January 1983	(Switzerland) Gstaad	Mattenschanze K88	NH
10	1982/83	25 February 1983	(Sweden) Falun	Lugnet K89	NH
11	1982/83	27 February 1983	(Finland) Lahti	Salpausselkä K88	NH
12	1982/83	6 March 1983	(Finland) Lahti	Salpausselkä K113	LH
13	1983/84	10 December 1983	(Canada) Thunder Bay	Big Thunder K89	NH
