= Armin Kogler =

Austrian ski jumper (born 1959)

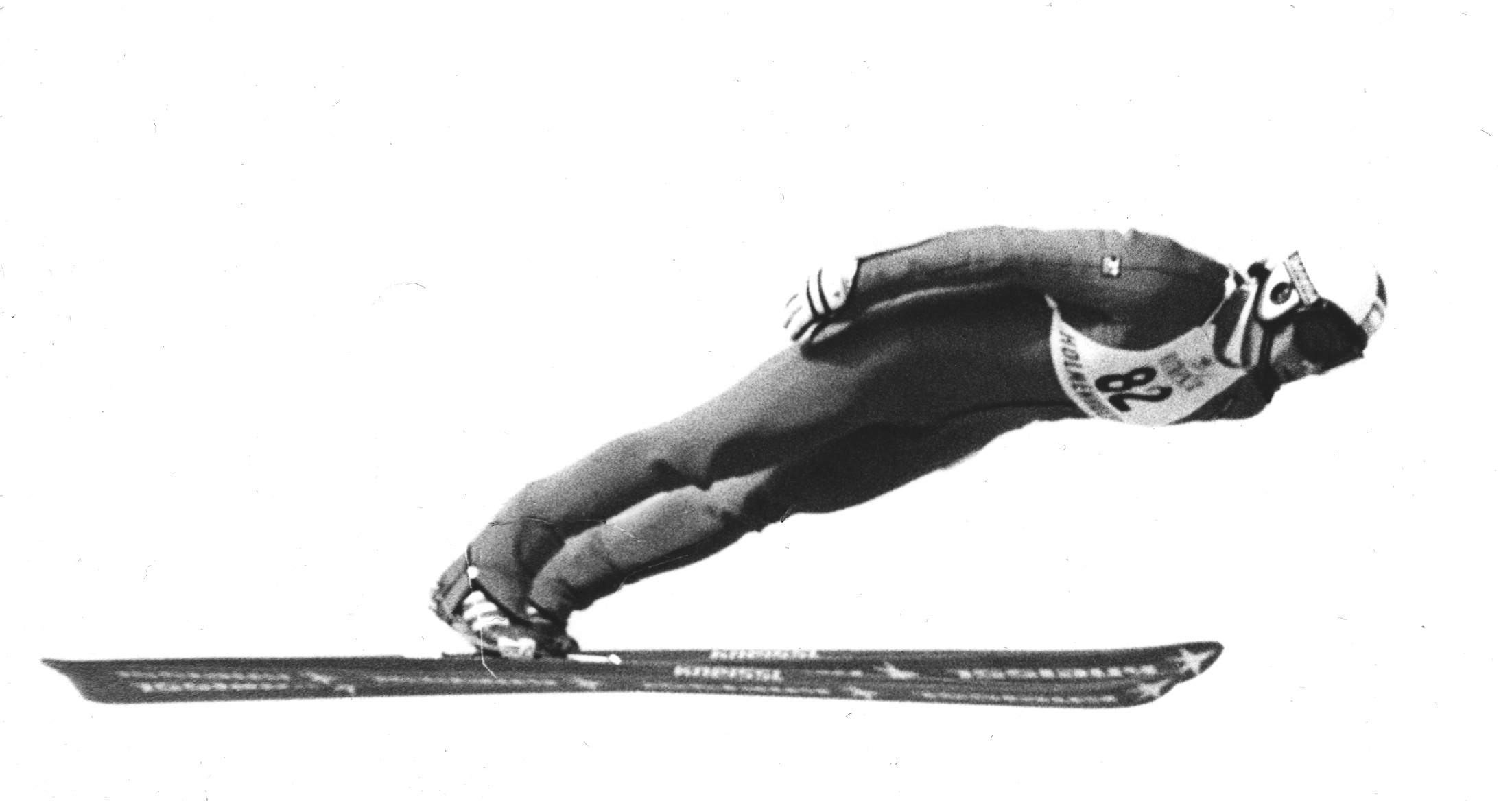
- Kogler in 1980

Personal information
- Nationality: Austria
- Born: 4 September 1959 (age 66) Schwaz, Austria
- Height: 178 cm (5 ft 10 in)

Sport
- Sport: Skiing

World Cup career
- Seasons: 1980–1985
- Indiv. starts: 95
- Indiv. podiums: 37
- Indiv. wins: 13
- Overall titles: 2 (1981, 1982)

Achievements and titles
- Personal bests: 180 m (591 ft); Oberstdorf, 27 February 1981
Medal record
Men's ski jumping
FIS Nordic World Ski Championships
Gold medal – first place	1982 Oslo	Individual NH
Silver medal – second place	1982 Oslo	Team LH
Silver medal – second place	1985 Seefeld	Team LH
Bronze medal – third place	1982 Oslo	Individual LH
Men's ski flying
FIS Ski Flying World Championships
Gold medal – first place	1979 Planica	Individual
Silver medal – second place	1981 Oberstdorf	Individual
- Updated on 10 February 2016

Armin Kogler (born 4 September 1959) is an Austrian former ski jumper.

== Career ==
After his surprise win at the FIS Ski-Flying World Championships 1979, Kogler set a new record in Planica (1981) with a leap of 180 meters. He won two World Cup overall titles (1981 and 1982) along with a complete set of medals at the 1982 FIS Nordic World Ski Championships with gold in the individual normal hill, a silver in the team large hill, and a bronze in the individual large hill.

He would then follow it up with a silver in the team large hill event at the 1985 FIS Nordic World Ski Championships in Seefeld. Additionally, Kogler won the ski jumping event at the Holmenkollen ski festival in 1980.

Kogler's best Olympic finish was fifth in the individual large hill at the 1980 Winter Olympics in Lake Placid.

For his ski jumping successes, he was awarded the Holmenkollen medal in 1984 (shared with Lars-Erik Eriksen and Jacob Vaage). Kogler is the uncle of Martin Koch.

On 27 March 1980 he tied the world record distance at 176 metres (577 ft) Toni Innauer and Klaus Ostwald at Čerťák hill in Harrachov, Czechoslovakia.

On 26 February 1981 he set another ski jumping world record distance at 180 metres (591 ft) on Heini-Klopfer-Skiflugschanze in Oberstdorf, West Germany.

== World Cup ==
=== Standings ===
Season	Overall	4H
1979/80	2nd place, silver medalist(s)	20
1980/81	1st place, gold medalist(s)	2nd place, silver medalist(s)
1981/82	1st place, gold medalist(s)	10
1982/83	3rd place, bronze medalist(s)	12
1983/84	11	14
1984/85	34	33

=== Wins ===
No.	Season	Date	Location	Hill	Size
1	1979/80	19 January 1980	(Canada) Thunder Bay	Big Thunder K89	NH
2	1979/80	20 January 1980	(Canada) Thunder Bay	Big Thunder K120	LH
3	1979/80	8 March 1990	(Finland) Lahti	Salpausselkä K88	NH
4	1979/80	16 March 1980	(Norway) Oslo	Holmenkollbakken K105	LH
5	1979/80	25 March 1980	(Czechoslovakia) Štrbské Pleso	MS 1970 A K110	LH
6	1980/81	6 January 1981	(Austria) Bischofshofen	Paul-Ausserleitner-Schanze K109	LH
7	1980/81	14 February 1981	(Japan) Sapporo	Ōkurayama K110	LH
8	1980/81	10 March 1981	(Sweden) Falun	Lugnet K89	NH
9	1981/82	17 January 1982	(Japan) Sapporo	Ōkurayama K110	LH
10	1981/82	27 January 1982	(Switzerland) St. Moritz	Olympiaschanze K96	NH
11	1981/82	21 February 1982	(Norway) Oslo (WCS)	Midtstubakken K85	NH
12	1982/83	1 January 1983	(West Germany) Garmisch-Partenkirchen	Große Olympiaschanze K107	LH
13	1982/83	11 March 1983	(Norway) Bærum	Skuibakken K110	LH

== Ski jumping world records ==
Date	Hill	Location	Metres	Feet
27 March 1980	Čerťák K165	Harrachov, Czechoslovakia	176	577
26 February 1981	Heini-Klopfer-Skiflugschanze K175	Oberstdorf, West Germany	180	591
