= Christoph Schwarz =

16th-century German court painter

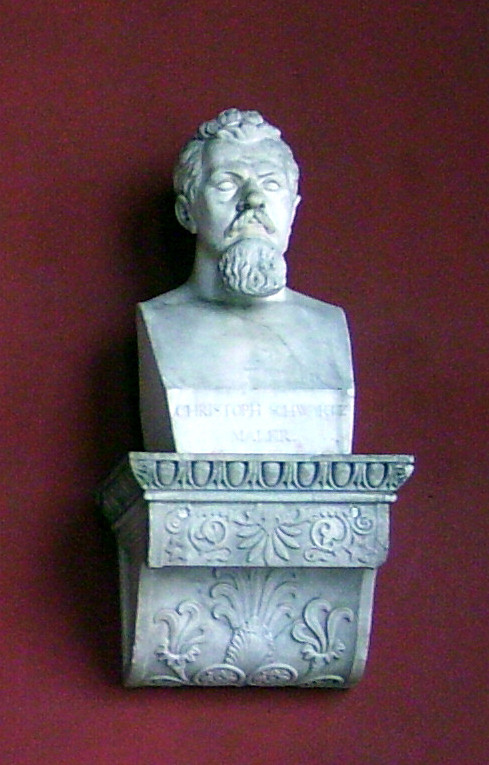
Christoph Schwartz bust in the Munich hall of fame called the Ruhmeshalle

Christoph Schwartz, Schwarz, or Schovarts (c. 1545 in München – April 15, 1592) was a German court painter.

== Biography ==
Houbraken remarked that he died the same year that Adrian de Bie was born. He took his information from Joachim von Sandrart's Teutsche Akademie. According to him, Schwartz was born in Ingolstadt and made many frescos and oil paintings while in the service of Maximilian I, Elector of Bavaria.

According to the RKD, he died in 1592 and was the student of Johann Melchior Bocksberger, with whom he painted frescoes in Augsburg and Wasserburg am Inn.
