= Olav Hansson =

Norwegian former ski jumper (born 1957)

Medal record

Men's ski jumping

Representing Norway

World Championships
| Gold medal – first place | 1982 Oslo | Team large hill |
| Silver medal – second place | 1982 Oslo | Individual large hill |

Olav Hansson (born 23 July 1957 in Vestre Aker, Oslo) is a Norwegian former ski jumper who competed from 1982 to 1987. At the 1982 FIS Nordic World Ski Championships in Oslo, he won a gold medal in the team large hill and a silver medal in the individual large hill.

Hansson was known as "Stilhopperen fra Røa", and always jumped in a full white jumping suit. He finished second a total of seven other times in his individual career at various hills between 1982 and 1987.
