= List of ski flying accidents =

This is a list of accidents in ski flying with confirmed video footage.

Date	Location	Event	Athlete(s) involved	Description	Aftermath	Ref.
3 Mar 1968	(Austria) Kulm	International Ski Flying Week	(Norway) Ronald Jensen	Lost control after clearing the knoll, flipping face first onto the slope.	Hospitalised with serious injuries.	
7 Mar 1970	(West Germany) Oberstdorf	International Ski Flying Week	(Socialist Federal Republic of Yugoslavia) Vinko Bogataj	Lost balance while descending the inrun, causing him to tumble wildly off the side directly in front of a group of spectators. No head protection was worn during this era.	Concussion and broken ankle for Bogataj, who continued his career for a short while longer. His accident was broadcast to American audiences on ABC's Wide World of Sports, representing "The Agony of Defeat".	
28/29 Mar 1980	(Czechoslovakia) Harrachov	Ski Jumping World Cup	(Czechoslovakia) Pavel Ploc	Crashed heavily from a height of 9 m (30 ft) onto the slope.	Recovered and later set a world record at the same venue in 1983.	
1 Jan 1983	(Czechoslovakia) Harrachov	Ski Flying World Championships	(Canada) Horst Bulau (Norway) Steinar Bråten (East Germany) Jens Weißflog	All three crashed at various stages of the event, similarly to Ploc in 1980. Inrun speed for Bråten was 115.2 km/h (71.6 mph).	Concussion for Bulau, who nonetheless finished second in that season's World Cup standings. Bråten recovered well enough to score his lone career win later in the season. Weißflog would go on to become one of the all-time greats in ski jumping.	
23 Feb 1985	(Czechoslovakia) Harrachov	Ski Jumping World Cup	(Czechoslovakia) Pavel Ploc	Crashed and somersaulted violently down the hill.	Escaped without major injury. Was able to claim bronze in the 1985 Ski Flying World Championships in Planica, less than a month later.	
15 Mar 1985	(Socialist Federal Republic of Yugoslavia) Planica	Ski Flying World Championships	(United States) Mark Konopacke	Lost pressure under one ski, allowing it to rotate, and crashed from a height of 3 m (9.8 ft)		
9 Mar 1986	(Austria) Kulm	Ski Flying World Championships	(Japan) Masahiro Akimoto (East Germany) Ulf Findeisen (Norway) Rolf Åge Berg	All three suffered brutal crashes, falling from a height of 9 m due to dangerous wind conditions.	Fractured ankle, chest and shoulder injuries for Akimoto. Cardiac arrest for Findeisen, who survived and continued a relatively successful career. Concussion and a broken cruciate ligament for Berg, whose injuries were career-ending.	
14/15 Mar 1987	(Socialist Federal Republic of Yugoslavia) Planica	Ski Jumping World Cup	(Norway) Robert Selbekk-Hansen	Crashed face-first from a height of 9 m after clearing the knoll.	Went on to become a sports trainer.	
14/15 Mar 1987	(Socialist Federal Republic of Yugoslavia) Planica	Ski Jumping World Cup	(France) Frédéric Berger	Fell from a height of 9 m after clearing the knoll, landing on his back. Having slid all the way down the hill, one of his skis (which had come loose and flown up high into the air) came down hard and hit him in the back.	Continued his career until 1988.	
22 Mar 1992	(Czechoslovakia) Harrachov	Ski Flying World Championships	(Austria) Andreas Goldberger	Fell from a height of 9 m and crashed very hard due to dangerous wind conditions. Inrun speed was 107.4 km/h (66.7 mph).	Broken arm and collarbone. Finished second in the event standings (the second day of which was cancelled) and enjoyed much success in a lengthy career.	
22 Mar 1992	(Czechoslovakia) Harrachov	Ski Flying World Championships	(Czechoslovakia) František Jež	Crashed similarly to Goldberger. Inrun speed was 106.7 km/h (66.3 mph).	Able to walk away with some help.	
20 Mar 1994	(Slovenia) Planica	Ski Flying World Championships	(Japan) Jinya Nishikata	Lost control after takeoff due to strong winds, falling face-first onto the slope and sliding down violently. Inrun speed was 101.4 km/h (63.0 mph).	Stretchered away with a dislocated shoulder. Continued his career until 2001.	
20 Mar 1994	(Slovenia) Planica	Ski Flying World Championships	(Sweden) Johan Rasmussen	Crashed violently after takeoff. Inrun speed was 103.5 km/h (64.3 mph).	Stretchered away and continued his career until 1996.	
23 Mar 1997	(Slovenia) Planica	Ski Flying World Cup	(Russia) Arthur Khamidulin	Ski flying debut. Lost control during landing, flipping over head-first past the outrun. Inrun speed was 100.3 km/h (62.3 mph).	Stretchered away and continued his career until a second crash in Vikersund, in 2000.	
28 Feb 1998	(Norway) Vikersund	Ski Flying World Cup	(Norway) Tommy Egeberg	Crashed at the top of the hill. Aged just 16, this was his first time at attempting ski flying.	Event was cancelled. Egeberg hospitalised overnight with a broken nose and light concussion, but continued his career until 2006.	
18 Mar 1999	(Slovenia) Planica	Ski Flying World Cup	(Russia) Valery Kobelev	Lost pressure under one ski, allowing it to rotate, and crashed head-first onto the hill, sliding unconscious down the slope. Inrun speed was 104.7 km/h (65.1 mph).	Induced coma for several months. Recovered well enough to continue his career until 2006.	
14 Feb 2000	(Norway) Vikersund	Ski Flying World Championships	(Russia) Arthur Khamidulin	Crashed near the knoll and was knocked out, losing his helmet and sliding down unconscious the rest of the way.	Concussion. Never competed in the sport again.	
19 Mar 2000	(Slovenia) Planica	Ski Flying World Cup	(Japan) Takanobu Okabe	Lost pressure under one ski and crashed very similarly to Kobelev in 1999. Inrun speed was 100 km/h (62 mph).	Concussion and bruising. Returned in the following season and continued in the sport for almost another decade with some success.	
16 Mar 2001	(Slovenia) Planica	Ski Flying World Cup	(Slovenia) Robert Kranjec	Crashed near the top of the hill, somersaulting violently down the slope.	Returned in the following season to continue a successful career, retiring in 2019.	
22 Mar 2002	(Slovenia) Planica	Ski Jumping World Cup	(Poland) Tomasz Pochwała	Crashed similarly to Kranjec in 2001. Inrun speed was 105.1 km/h (65.3 mph).	Returned in the following season. Later switched to Nordic combined.	
10 Jan 2014	(Austria) Kulm	Ski Flying World Cup	(Austria) Thomas Morgenstern	Lost pressure under one ski and crashed after clearing the knoll, landing on his head and back from a height of 6 m (20 ft). Inrun speed was 100.4 km/h (62.4 mph).	Recovered well enough to win a silver medal with the Austrian national team at the 2014 Winter Olympics in Sochi, but retired at the end of the season.	
13 Jan 2016	(Austria) Kulm	Ski Flying World Championships	(Austria) Lukas Müller	Crashed during a training round prior to the event in heavy snow and fog, landing on his back after a ski binding came loose in mid-air.	Hospitalised with career-ending spinal injuries.	
3 Feb 2019	(Germany) Oberstdorf	Ski Flying World Cup	(Czech Republic) Tomáš Vančura	Lost pressure under one ski and crashed from a height of 6 m. Inrun speed was 100.5 km/h (62.4 mph).	Walked away unhurt.	
25 Mar 2021	(Slovenia) Planica	Ski Flying World Cup	(Norway) Daniel-André Tande	Lost pressure under one ski after clearing the knoll and crashed from a height of 6 m. Inrun speed was 102.6 km/h (63.8 mph).	Induced coma, broken collarbone. Made a full recovery and won a competition in the following season.	

== Flat-ground crashes ==
Date	Location	Event	Athlete(s) involved	Description	Aftermath	Ref.
1 Jan 1973	(West Germany) Oberstdorf	Ski Flying World Championships	(Switzerland) Walter Steiner	Crashed onto near-flat ground at 175 m (574 ft) and 179 m (587 ft), on separate jumps.	Concussion and a fractured rib. Finished second in the event.	
16/17 Mar 1974	(Socialist Federal Republic of Yugoslavia) Planica	International Ski Flying Week	(Switzerland) Walter Steiner	Crashed onto near-flat ground at 177 m (581 ft).	Walked away with facial cuts. Won the event with a world record (169 m, ex aequo with Heinz Wosipiwo) set prior to the crash.	
20 Mar 2005	(Slovenia) Planica	Ski Jumping World Cup	(Finland) Janne Ahonen	Crashed onto near-flat ground at 240 m (790 ft), landing hard on his back and head.	Stretchered away with minor injuries. Was able to attend a podium ceremony later in the event for winning the World Cup.	
30 Jan 2010	(Germany) Oberstdorf	Ski Flying World Cup	(Slovenia) Robert Kranjec	Crashed onto near-flat ground at 226 m (741 ft).	Walked away unhurt.	
25 Feb 2012	(Norway) Vikersund	Ski Flying World Championships	(Austria) Martin Koch	Crashed onto near-flat ground at 243.5 m (799 ft)	Walked away unhurt. Received bronze medal for finishing third.	
2 Feb 2013	(Czech Republic) Harrachov	Ski Flying World Cup	(Slovenia) Jurij Tepeš	Crashed onto near-flat ground at 220 m (720 ft)	Walked away unhurt. His jump remains the unofficial hill record as of 2013.	
15 Feb 2015	(Norway) Vikersund	Ski Flying World Cup	(Russia) Dmitry Vassiliev	Crashed onto near-flat ground at 254 m (833 ft), landing hard on his back and head.	Able to walk away and compete the next day. His was unofficially the longest made in the sport until 2025.	
16 Mar 2016	(Slovenia) Planica	Ski Flying World Cup	(Slovenia) Tilen Bartol	Crashed onto near-flat ground at 252 m (827 ft) and almost broke his neck.	Able to walk away and compete the next day. His jump remained the unofficial hill record until 2019.	
17 Mar 2024	(Norway) Vikersund	Ski Jumping World Cup	(Norway) Silje Opseth	Crashed straight after the landing at an unofficial world record distance of 236.5 m.	Walked away with facial cuts and set a world record of 230,5 m round about two hours later.	
