= FIS Ski Flying World Championships 1985 =

1985 edition of the FIS Ski-Flying World Championships

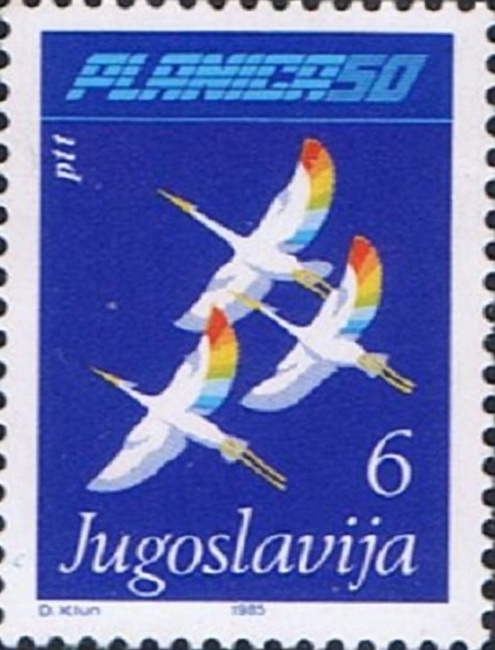
- Venue: Velikanka bratov Gorišek K185
- Date: 16–17 March 1985
- Competitors: 44 from 13 nations
- Winning score: 580.5

Medalists
gold medal	Matti Nykänen	Finland
silver medal	Jens Weißflog	East Germany
bronze medal	Pavel Ploc	Czechoslovakia

The FIS Ski Flying World Ski Championships 1985 was held between 16 and 17 March in Planica, Yugoslavia. This was the third record time hosting world championships after 1972 and 1979.

The attendance at Planica was an all-time record, with a total of 150,000 people in three days: 20,000 people in training, 80,000 on the first day and 50,000 on the second day of the competition.

== Schedule ==
Date	Event	Rounds	Longest jump of the day	Visitors
13 March 1985	Hill test	2	173 metres (568 ft) by Matjaž Debelak	N/A
14 March 1985	Hill test 2	2	158 metres (518 ft) by Matjaž Debelak	N/A
15 March 1985	Official training	3	191 metres (627 ft) by Matti Nykänen	20,000
16 March 1985	Individual, Day 1	3	190 metres (623 ft) by Matti Nykänen	80,000
17 March 1985	Individual, Day 2	2	187 metres (614 ft) by Matti Nykänen	50,000

== All jumps over 190 metres ==
Chronological order:

- 191 metres (627 ft) – 15 March – Matti Nykänen (WR, 2RD, Official training)
- 190 metres (623 ft) – 16 March – Matti Nykänen (1RD)

== Competition ==
On 13 March 1985 premiere hill test was on schedule. Yugoslavian ski jumper Branko Dolhar had honour to be the first. Distance of the day was set by Matjaž Debelak at 173 metres.

On 14 March 1985 second hill test or unofficial training was on schedule with ten Yugoslavian trial jumpers who made 20 jumps in total. Matjaž Debelak set the longest distance at 158 metres.

On 15 March 1985 official training in three rounds was on schedule with no qualifying. Three world records were set: Mike Holland in 1st round with 186 metres. Matti Nykänen broke the record short after with 187 in first and 191 metres in 2nd round.

On 16 March 1985 first day of championships with three rounds in competition on schedule in front of 80,000 people, a record Planica daily crowd and still one of the most visited ski jumping events ever. They saw Nykänen's 190 metres jump in the first round.

On 17 March 1985 second and final day of world championships with only two rounds in competition, because the last round was canceled. Nykänen totally dominated with two world records and became world champion.

=== Hill test ===
Morning — 13 March 1985 — Two rounds — chronological order not available

Bib	Name	1RD	2RD
N/A	(Socialist Federal Republic of Yugoslavia) Branko Dolhar	165.0 m	135.0 m
N/A	(Socialist Federal Republic of Yugoslavia) Rajko Lotrič	112.0 m	130.0 m
N/A	(Socialist Federal Republic of Yugoslavia) Aleš Peljhan	164.0 m	160.0 m
N/A	(Socialist Federal Republic of Yugoslavia) Zoran Kešar	109.0 m	112.0 m
N/A	(Socialist Federal Republic of Yugoslavia) Bojan Globočnik	155.0 m	N/A
N/A	(Socialist Federal Republic of Yugoslavia) Krištof Gašpirc	130.0 m	133.0 m
N/A	(Socialist Federal Republic of Yugoslavia) Iztok Melin	127.0 m	120.0 m
N/A	(Socialist Federal Republic of Yugoslavia) Vili Tepeš	120.0 m	126.0 m
N/A	(Socialist Federal Republic of Yugoslavia) Janez Štirn	158.0 m	N/A
N/A	(Socialist Federal Republic of Yugoslavia) Matjaž Debelak	173.0 m	N/A
N/A	(Socialist Federal Republic of Yugoslavia) Peter Slatnar	112.0 m	N/A
N/A	(Socialist Federal Republic of Yugoslavia) Borut Dolenc	135.0 m	N/A
N/A	(Socialist Federal Republic of Yugoslavia) Jože Verdev	130.0 m	N/A

=== Official training ===
Trial jumpers — 15 March 1985 — chronological order not available

Bib	Name	1RD	2RD	3RD
Test jumpers
N/A	(Socialist Federal Republic of Yugoslavia) Matjaž Debelak	145.0 m	185.0 m	—
N/A	(Socialist Federal Republic of Yugoslavia) Vasja Bajc	139.0 m	—	—
N/A	(Socialist Federal Republic of Yugoslavia) Aleš Peljhan	139.0 m	—	—
N/A	(Socialist Federal Republic of Yugoslavia) Jože Verdev	128.0 m	128.0 m	142.0 m
N/A	(Socialist Federal Republic of Yugoslavia) Bojan Globočnik	122.0 m	117.0 m	—
N/A	(Socialist Federal Republic of Yugoslavia) Zoran Kešar	118.0 m	—	—
N/A	(Socialist Federal Republic of Yugoslavia) Krištof Gašpirc	117.0 m	116.0 m	—
N/A	(Socialist Federal Republic of Yugoslavia) Iztok Melin	106.0 m	—	—
N/A	(Socialist Federal Republic of Yugoslavia) Vili Tepeš	94.0 m	—	—
N/A	(Socialist Federal Republic of Yugoslavia) Janez Štirn	122.0 m	—	154.0 m

11:00 AM — Competitors — 15 March 1985 — incomplete chronological order

Bib	Name	1RD	2RD	3RD
Competitors
3	(United States) Mark Konopacke	118.0 m	117.0 m	133.0 m
4	(United States) Mike Holland	186.0 m	175.0 m	159.0 m
10	(Socialist Federal Republic of Yugoslavia) Matjaž Žagar	168.0 m	167.0 m	—
16	(Austria) Ernst Vettori	144.0 m	162.0 m	154.0 m
18	(Socialist Federal Republic of Yugoslavia) Tomaž Dolar	120.0 m	136.0 m	137.0 m
26	(Finland) Matti Nykänen	187.0 m	191.0 m	172.0 m
28	(Austria) Franz Wiegele	158.0 m	173.0 m	159.0 m
34	(Socialist Federal Republic of Yugoslavia) Borut Mur	95.0 m	119.0 m	124.0 m
36	(East Germany) Klaus Ostwald	124.0 m	139.0 m	129.0 m
41	(Poland) Piotr Fijas	128.0 m	171.0 m	143.0 m
42	(Socialist Federal Republic of Yugoslavia) Miran Tepeš	129.0 m	175.0 m	164.0 m
43	(Norway) Ole Gunnar Fidjestøl	174.0 m	176.0 m	154.0 m
44	(Czechoslovakia) Pavel Ploc	129.0 m	121.0 m	151.0 m
46	(East Germany) Jens Weißflog	138.0 m	175.0 m	152.0 m
49	(Norway) Per Bergerud	121.0 m	159.0 m	151.0 m
N/A	(Czechoslovakia) Ladislav Dluhoš	—	143.0 m	141.0 m
N/A	(Finland) Tuomo Ylipulli	169.0 m	168.0 m	161.0 m
N/A	(Czechoslovakia) Vladimír Podzimek	143.0 m	150.0 m	149.0 m
N/A	(Austria) Richard Schallert	158.0 m	153.0 m	—
N/A	(West Germany) Thomas Klauser	131.0 m	167.0 m	—
N/A	(Finland) Jukka Kalso	119.0 m	149.0 m	135.0 m
N/A	(Norway) Steinar Bråten	109.0 m	144.0 m	146.0 m
N/A	(Austria) Andreas Felder	159.0 m	134.0 m	156.0 m
N/A	(Austria) Franz Neuländtner	125.0 m	173.0 m	140.0 m
N/A	(East Germany) Ulf Findeisen	149.0 m	159.0 m	132.0 m
N/A	(Czechoslovakia) Jiří Parma	119.0 m	157.0 m	151.0 m
N/A	(Norway) Hroar Stjernen	128.0 m	133.0 m	151.0 m
N/A	(Switzerland) Gérard Balanche	129.0 m	143.0 m	147.0 m
N/A	(Finland) Mika Kojonkoski	—	147.0 m	156.0 m
N/A	(Norway) Trond Jøran Pedersen	150.0 m	164.0 m	151.0 m
N/A	(West Germany) Lorenz Wegscheider	132.0 m	126.0 m	118.0 m
N/A	(United States) Zane Palmer	131.0 m	144.0 m	134.0 m
N/A	(United States) Chris Hastings	116.0 m	153.0 m	139.0 m
N/A	(Poland) Tadeusz Fijas	124.0 m	146.0 m	144.0 m
N/A	(East Germany) Raimund Litschko	102.0 m	151.0 m	128.0 m
N/A	(France) Gérard Colin	132.0 m	150.0 m	141.0 m
N/A	(Finland) Kimmo Kylmäaho	126.0 m	148.0 m	118.0 m
N/A	(West Germany) Uli Boll	98.0 m	131.0 m	123.0 m
N/A	(France) Frédéric Berger	118.0 m	141.0 m	131.0 m
N/A	(Czechoslovakia) Miroslav Polák	157.0 m	167.0 m	150.0 m
N/A	(Socialist Federal Republic of Yugoslavia) Primož Ulaga	134.0 m	128.0 m	123.0 m
N/A	(Switzerland) Pascal Reymond	104.0 m	131.0 m	134.0 m
N/A	(West Germany) Thomas Haßlberger	92.0 m	102.0 m	—
N/A	(France) Patrick Dubiez	112.0 m	148.0 m	125.0 m
N/A	(United States) Rick Mewborn	123.0 m	131.0 m	147.0 m
N/A	(Spain) Bernat Solà	106.0 m	105.0 m	124.0 m
N/A	(Italy) Sandro Sambugaro	125.0 m	122.0 m	111.0 m
N/A	(Italy) Massimo Rigoni	117.0 m	—	104.0 m
N/A	(Italy) Roberto Varutti	111.0 m	122.0 m	114.0 m
N/A	(France) Eric Brèche	109.0 m	109.0 m	106.0 m

== Official results ==
3 of 5 best jumps counted. Two best from first day and the best one from second day. The last 6th round was canceled.

Rank	Bib (D1)	Bib (D2)	Name	D1 (16 March 1985)			D2 (17 March 1985)		Points
Rank	Bib (D1)	Bib (D2)	Name	1RD	2RD	3RD	4RD	5RD	Points
1st place, gold medalist(s)	11	44	(Finland) Matti Nykänen	190.0 m	174.0 m	180.0 m	187.0 m	186.0 m	580.5
2nd place, silver medalist(s)	15	43	(East Germany) Jens Weißflog	164.0 m	174.0 m	170.0 m	168.0 m	166.0 m	531.5
3rd place, bronze medalist(s)	17	42	(Czechoslovakia) Pavel Ploc	169.0 m	169.0 m	158.0 m	142.0 m	173.0 m	524.0
4	31	36	(East Germany) Klaus Ostwald	98.0 m	166.0 m	159.0 m	180.0 m	155.0 m	517.0
5	7	41	(Czechoslovakia) Ladislav Dluhoš	170.0 m	165.0 m	133.0 m	168.0 m	153.0 m	515.0
6	35	40	(Socialist Federal Republic of Yugoslavia) Miran Tepeš	167.0 m	161.0 m	164.0 m	143.0 m	164.0 m	511.5
7	1	35	(Finland) Tuomo Ylipulli	168.0 m	161.0 m	145.0 m	144.0 m	173.0 m	510.5
8	33	38	(West Germany) Thomas Klauser	166.0 m	158.0 m	162.0 m	157.0 m	165.0 m	509.0
	20	37	(United States) Mike Holland	164.0 m	164.0 m	164.0 m	170.0 m	169.0 m	509.0
10	12	31	(Norway) Ole Gunnar Fidjestøl	165.0 m	157.0 m	145.0 m	170.0 m	153.0 m	508.5
11	19	39	(Socialist Federal Republic of Yugoslavia) Primož Ulaga	144.0 m	169.0 m	163.0 m	124.0 m	151.0 m	490.5
12	27	30*	(Norway) Per Bergerud	164.0 m	158.0 m	139.0 m	157.0 m	159.0 m	481.5
13	32	28	(Socialist Federal Republic of Yugoslavia) Matjaž Žagar	151.0 m	163.0 m	153.0 m	158.0 m	141.0 m	480.5
14	21	34	(Poland) Piotr Fijas	159.0 m	165.0 m	152.0 m	133.0 m	151.0 m	477.0
15	44	26	(Austria) Andreas Felder	162.0 m	151.0 m	105.0 m	163.0 m	134.0 m	476.0
	10	29*	(Austria) Franz Neuländtner	159.0 m	145.0 m	162.0 m	154.0 m	139.0 m	476.0
17	36	27	(East Germany) Ulf Findeisen	110.0 m	166.0 m	152.0 m	117.0 m	153.0 m	473.5
18	22	32	(Czechoslovakia) Jiří Parma	143.0 m	159.0 m	153.0 m	140.0 m	146.0 m	472.5
19	9	23	(Norway) Hroar Stjernen	102.0 m	145.0 m	153.0 m	142.0 m	159.0 m	461.0
20	16	25*	(Austria) Ernst Vettori	165.0 m	140.0 m	136.0 m	142.0 m	153.0 m	460.5
21	34	33	(Austria) Franz Wiegele	164.0 m	162.0 m	153.0 m	160.0 m	—	453.5
22	42	24*	(Switzerland) Gérard Balanche	157.0 m	141.0 m	147.0 m	138.0 m	142.0 m	445.0
23	25	21*	(Finland) Mika Kojonkoski	145.0 m	141.0 m	138.0 m	163.0 m	158.0 m	443.5
24	24	22	(Norway) Trond Jøran Pedersen	139.0 m	145.0 m	142.0 m	150.0 m	152.0 m	437.0
25	18	18	(West Germany) Lorenz Wegscheider	141.0 m	138.0 m	123.0 m	136.0 m	156.0 m	428.0
26	6	20*	(Socialist Federal Republic of Yugoslavia) Tomaž Dolar	135.0 m	151.0 m	124.0 m	142.0 m	135.0 m	422.0
27	2	13	(United States) Zane Palmer	135.0 m	135.0 m	136.0 m	130.0 m	156.0 m	420.0
28	40	17	(United States) Chris Hastings	141.0 m	140.0 m	131.0 m	128.0 m	143.0 m	410.0
29	26	19	(Poland) Tadeusz Fijas	140.0 m	145.0 m	122.0 m	136.0 m	113.0 m	408.0
30	5	15	(East Germany) Raimund Litschko	126.0 m	143.0 m	124.0 m	142.0 m	140.0 m	407.5
31	3	12*	(France) Gérard Colin	134.0 m	132.0 m	132.0 m	118.0 m	148.0 m	403.5
32	38	16	(Finland) Kimmo Kylmäaho	129.0 m	122.0 m	142.0 m	136.0 m	122.0 m	398.5
33	37	10	(West Germany) Uli Boll	136.0 m	132.0 m	125.0 m	139.0 m	134.0 m	390.5
34	27	11*	(France) Frédéric Berger	133.0 m	134.0 m	132.0 m	132.0 m	136.0 m	390.0
35	43	5*	(Czechoslovakia) Miroslav Polák	113.0 m	128.0 m	122.0 m	118.0 m	151.0 m	389.5
	29	14	(Switzerland) Pascal Reymond	122.0 m	136.0 m	135.0 m	124.0 m	129.0 m	389.5
37	4	4	(West Germany) Thomas Haßlberger	117.0 m	132.0 m	107.0 m	142.0 m	153.0 m	385.0
38	14	9	(France) Patrick Dubiez	132.0 m	131.0 m	122.0 m	122.0 m	136.0 m	381.0
39	30	8	(United States) Rick Mewborn	122.0 m	119.0 m	133.0 m	120.0 m	139.0 m	378.0
40	23	6*	(Spain) Bernat Solà	125.0 m	123.0 m	125.0 m	128.0 m	140.0 m	375.5
41	8	7	(Italy) Sandro Sambugaro	128.0 m	128.0 m	111.0 m	129.0 m	131.0 m	368.5
42	13	3	(Italy) Massimo Rigoni	121.0 m	109.0 m	117.0 m	124.0 m	117.0 m	345.0
43	28	2	(Italy) Roberto Varutti	106.0 m	115.0 m	120.0 m	102.0 m	108.0 m	317.5
44	39	1	(France) Eric Brèche	107.0 m	110.0 m	110.0 m	110.0 m	123.0 m	314.5

World record!
Didn't count into official results. The lowest scored jump of the day.

== Ski flying world records ==
Date	Name	Country	Metres	Feet
15 March 1985	Mike Holland	United States	186	610
15 March 1985	Matti Nykänen	Finland	187	614
15 March 1985	Matti Nykänen	Finland	191	627

== Medal table ==
Rank	Nation	Gold	Silver	Bronze	Total
1	Finland (FIN)	1	0	0	1
2	East Germany (GDR)	0	1	0	1
3	Czechoslovakia (TCH)	0	0	1	1
Totals (3 entries)		1	1	1	3
