= Ski flying =

Sport discipline derived from ski jumping

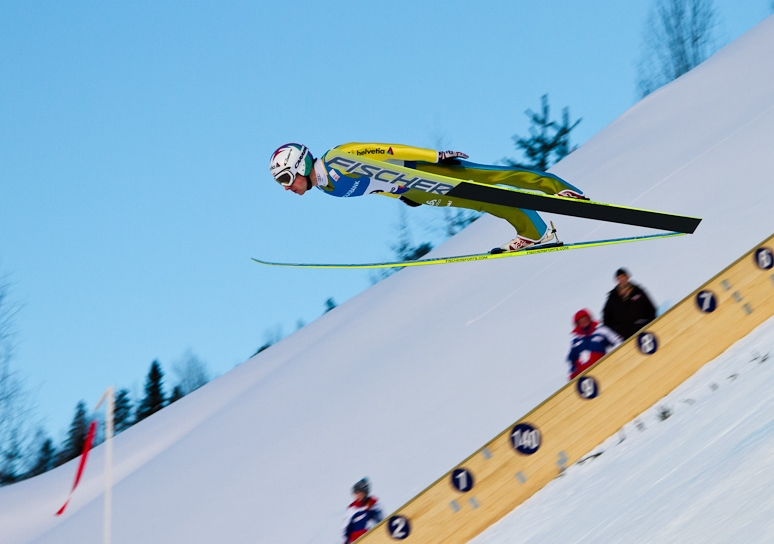
- Simon Ammann in Vikersund, 2011
- Highest governing body: International Ski and Snowboard Federation
- First contested: 15 March 1936, Bloudkova velikanka, Planica, Kingdom of Yugoslavia (now Slovenia)

Characteristics
- Team members: Teams of four
- Mixed-sex: No
- Type: Turn-based individual sport; Winter sport; Nordic skiing
- Equipment: Skis; Ski suit Helmet; Goggles
- Venue: Ski jumping hill (185 m or larger)

Presence
- Country or region: Slovenia; Germany; Austria; Norway; United States (1970–1994); Czech Republic (1980–2014)
- Olympic: No
- World Championships: 1972–present

Ski flying is a winter sport discipline derived from ski jumping, in which much greater distances can be achieved. It is a form of competitive individual Nordic skiing where athletes descend at high speed along a specially designed takeoff ramp using skis only, jump from the end of it with as much power as they can generate, then glide – or 'fly' – as far as possible down a steeply sloped hill, and ultimately land within a target zone in a stable manner. Points are awarded for distance and stylistic merit by five judges. Events are governed by the International Ski and Snowboard Federation (Fédération Internationale de Ski et de Snowboard; FIS).

The rules and scoring in ski flying are mostly the same as they are in ski jumping, and events under the discipline are usually contested as part of the FIS Ski Jumping World Cup season, but the hills – of which there are only five remaining, all in Europe – are constructed to different specifications in order to enable jumps of up to 66% longer in distance. There is also a stronger emphasis on aerodynamics and harnessing the wind, as well as an increased element of danger due to athletes flying much higher and faster than in ski jumping.

From its beginnings in the 1930s, ski flying has developed its own distinct history and since given rise to all of the sport's world records. The first hill designed specifically for ski flying was built in Yugoslavia in 1934, after which both Germany and Austria built their own hills in 1950. This was followed by Norway in 1966, the United States in 1970, and Czechoslovakia in 1980. From the 1960s to 1980s, a friendly rivalry between the European venues saw world records being set regularly, together with hill upgrades and evolutions in technique to fly longer distances. The FIS Ski Flying World Championships was first contested in 1972 in Planica.

Ski flying remains at its most popular in Norway and Slovenia, where all world records have been set since 1985.

== History ==
=== 1930s–1940s ===
==== Breaking the 100 metre barrier and the birth of ski flying ====
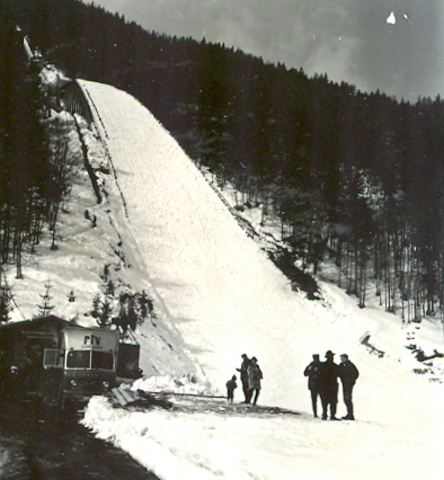
The first ever ski flying events were held at Bloudkova velikanka in Planica, Kingdom of Yugoslavia (pictured in 1963)

The origins of ski flying can be traced directly to 15 March 1936 in Planica, Slovenia (then a part of the Kingdom of Yugoslavia), when 18-year-old Austrian Josef "Sepp" Bradl became the first man in history to land a ski jump of over 100 metres (330 ft). His world record jump of 101.5 m (333 ft) was set at Bloudkova velikanka ("Bloudek giant"), a new hill designed and completed in 1934 by engineers Stanko Bloudek and Ivan Rožman, together with Joso Gorec. A year earlier, Olav Ulland had crossed the 100 m barrier in Ponte di Legno, Italy, but touched the snow with his hands, which rendered his jump – and world record – unofficial.

With jumps now in the triple digits, Bloudek enthused: "That was no longer ski jumping. That was ski flying!" It was with these words that ski flying took on a life of its own. Such was the awe and disbelief at these massive jumps, the units of measurement were trivialised by the media, who suggested that the metre used in Yugoslavia was shorter than elsewhere in Europe.

Bradl later spoke fondly of the jump which made him an icon in the sport:

The air pushed violently against my chest; I leaned right into it and let it carry me. I had only one wish: to fly as far as possible! ... [After landing the jump], many thousands of curious eyes looked up at the judges' tower. I could hardly believe it when an additional "1" popped up on the scoreboard! (Note: "Die Luft drückte gewaltig gegen meine Brust, ich legte mich richtig drauf und ließ mich von ihr tragen. Ich hatte nur den einen Wunsch: immer so weiterfliegen! ... Viele tausend Augen starrten gespannt hinauf zum Kampfrichterturm. Ich konnte es fast nicht glauben, als neben der normalen Anzeigetafel eine 'Eins' herausgeklappt wurde!")

==== Dispute between the FIS and Planica ====
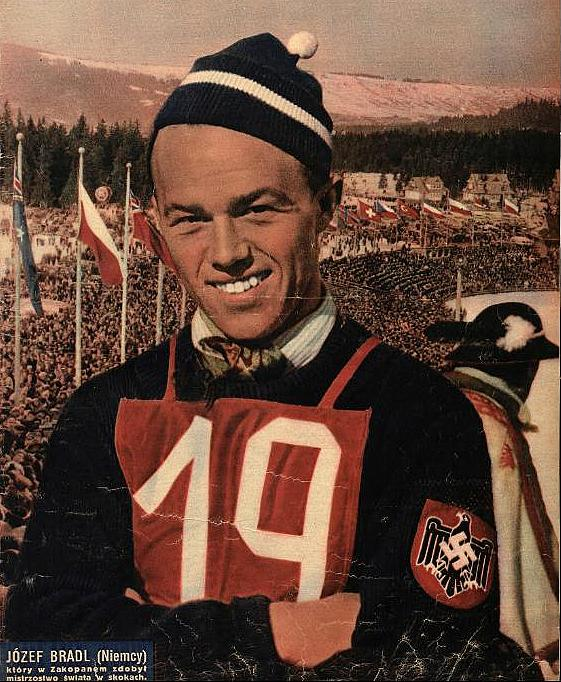
Josef "Sepp" Bradl was the first ski jumper to land a jump of more than 100 m (330 ft)

In the early 1930s, prior to the construction of Bloudkova velikanka, the FIS had deemed ski jumping hills with a K-point (German: Konstruktionspunkt) of 70 m (230 ft) to be the absolute largest permissible. Athletes who chose to compete on hills with a K-point of more than 80 m (260 ft) were outright denied a licence to jump, and events allowing for distances beyond 90 m (300 ft) were strongly discouraged – even denounced – on the grounds that they were unnecessarily dangerous and brought the sport into disrepute. Bloudek and his team nonetheless went ahead and flouted the rules in creating a so-called "mammoth hill" specifically designed for previously unimaginable distances. Bloudkova velikanka originally had a K-point of 90 m, by far the largest of any hill at the time, but was upgraded in less than two years to 106 m (348 ft) in eager anticipation of the 100+ m jumps to come. In 1938, two years after his milestone jump, Josef Bradl improved his world record by a wide margin to 107 m (351 ft).

After a period of wrangling and increasing public interest in the novelty of this new 'extreme' form of ski jumping, the FIS relented. In 1938, a decision was made at the fifteenth International Ski Congress in Helsinki, Finland, to allow for "experimental" hill design, thereby officially recognising ski flying as a sanctioned discipline. Despite this reluctant recognition, the FIS still frowned upon the practice of aiming predominantly for long distances over style, and presently refuses to publish lists of world records in an official capacity. Furthermore, the rules for ski flying would not be fully established until after World War II.

In 1941, with the K-point increased further to 120 m (390 ft), the world record was broken five times in Planica: it went from 108 m (354 ft) to 118 m (387 ft) in a single day, shared between four athletes. After World War II, Fritz Tschannen matched the K-point with a jump of 120 m in 1948.

=== 1950s–1960s ===
==== New hills across Europe ====
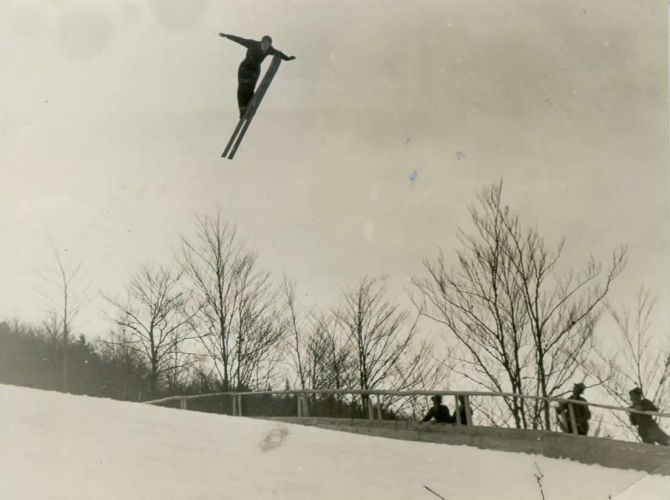
Franc Pribošek in Planica, 1936

A challenger to Planica arrived in 1949 with the construction of Heini-Klopfer-Skiflugschanze ("Heini Klopfer ski flying hill") in Oberstdorf, West Germany. Designed by former ski jumper turned architect Heini Klopfer, as well as then-active ski jumpers Toni Brutscher and Sepp Weiler, the hill had a K-point of 120 m to match that of Bloudkova velikanka. The FIS, still wary of the rising popularity of ski flying and wanting to keep it in check, refused to sanction the construction of the hill, having previously denounced the 1947 and 1948 events in Planica.

The stance of the FIS eased once again, as the inaugural event in Oberstdorf was given approval to be staged in 1950. During this week-long event, an estimated crowd of altogether 100,000 witnessed the world record fall three times, with Dan Netzell claiming the final figure of 135 m (443 ft). Tauno Luiro eclipsed it the following year by jumping 139 m (456 ft), a world record which would stay in place for almost ten years until Jože Šlibar jumped 141 m (463 ft) in 1961.

Also in 1950, a ski flying hill was built at Kulm in Tauplitz/Bad Mitterndorf, Austria. Peter Lesser first equalled the world record there in 1962, improving it three years later to 145 m (476 ft). Another hill entered the scene in 1966, when Vikersundbakken ("Vikersund hill") in Vikersund, Norway, was rebuilt to ski flying specifications, having originally opened as a ski jumping hill in 1936. On this newly rebuilt hill the world record was first equalled by Bjørn Wirkola, then broken again by Wirkola the next day.

==== Breaking the 150 metre barrier ====
The world record returned to Oberstdorf a year later, being broken three times at the same event; Lars Grini becoming the first athlete to reach 150 m (490 ft). A month later, Reinhold Bachler jumped 154 m (505 ft) in Vikersund, which would be the last world record on that hill until 2011.

Seeking to co-operate on hill design and event organisation, the venues at Kulm, Oberstdorf and Planica formed the KOP working group in 1962 (KOP being an abbreviation of Kulm/Oberstdorf/Planica). This group would go on to consult with the FIS in all aspects of ski flying, celebrating their 50th anniversary in 2012. In 1953, Kulm hosted the first International Ski Flying Week, which would be the premier event in ski flying until 1972.

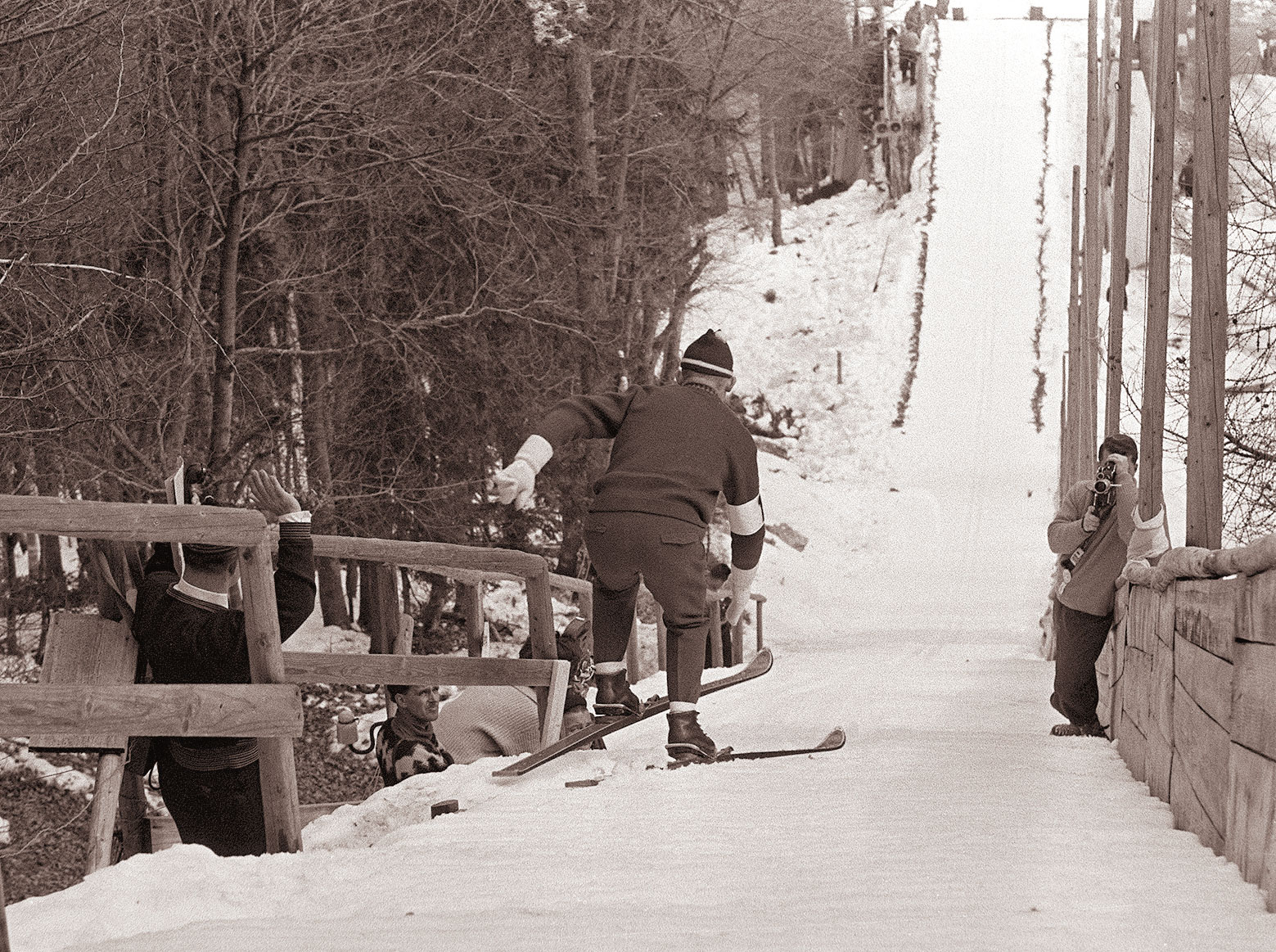
An athlete about to descend the inrun in Planica, 1960

Planica reclaimed the world record in 1969 with a new hill named Velikanka bratov Gorišek ("Giant by brothers Gorišek"). This was the brainchild of Slovenian brothers Janez and Vlado Gorišek, both engineers, who opted to design a new hill with a K-point of 153 m (502 ft) instead of enlarging the adjacent Bloudkova velikanka, which was showing signs of deterioration. Today, Janez is affectionately called the "father" of modern ski flying and a revered figure in Slovenia. Bloudkova velikanka was subsequently recategorised as a ski jumping hill.

In the opening event at Velikanka bratov Gorišek, five world records were set: Wirkola and Jiří Raška traded it amongst themselves four times, until Manfred Wolf ended their run with a jump of 165 m (541 ft). The 1960s remains the decade with the highest amount of world records since the advent of ski flying, with seventeen in total set on the hills in Oberstdorf, Planica, Kulm, and Vikersund. By contrast the 1950s had the fewest with five, all set in Oberstdorf.

=== 1970s ===
==== Planica versus Oberstdorf ====
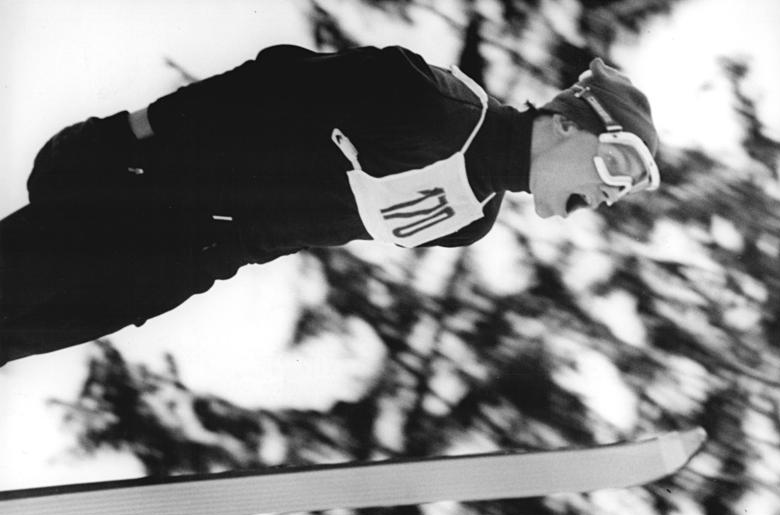
Henry Glaß, 1970

The world record stayed in Planica for four years, during which the K-point at Velikanka bratov Gorišek was upgraded to 165 m in time for the inaugural Ski Flying World Championships in 1972, which eventually superseded International Ski Flying Week. This new event was sanctioned a year earlier by the FIS at their 28th International Ski Congress in Opatija, Croatia (then a part of Yugoslavia). Much like in 1938 when the discipline received official recognition from the FIS, another milestone had been reached as ski flying was now granted its own world championship–level event on par with the Nordic World Ski Championships in ski jumping, having spent almost four decades as a mere 'special attraction' alongside its older and more prestigious sibling.

With no world records set at the 1972 event, the organisers in Oberstdorf got to work by upgrading their hill to a K-point of 175 m (574 ft) for the 1973 Ski Flying World Championships. Janez Gorišek was brought in to oversee the project following Heini Klopfer's death in 1968. With the gauntlet laid down, the results were showcased immediately when Heinz Wossipiwo set a world record of 169 m (554 ft) in Oberstdorf. Determined to claim the world record for himself, Walter Steiner – the reigning Ski Flying World Champion – jumped 175 m (574 ft) and 179 m (587 ft) but crashed heavily on both attempts, sustaining a concussion and a fractured rib. He would finish the event with a silver medal, behind winner Hans-Georg Aschenbach.

A year later in Planica, in front of a 50,000-strong crowd, Steiner finally achieved the world record he had been striving for, landing a jump of 169 m to equal that of Wossipiwo in 1973. Spectators were astonished and the event organisers momentarily bewildered, as Steiner had landed well beyond the markers used to indicate distance alongside the hill, which only went as far as the existing K-point of 165 m. For the first time since their respective hills had been built, the competition was levelled between Oberstdorf and Planica. On the next day of the event in the latter, Steiner tried to go even further: he landed at 177 m (581 ft) but fell down on what was almost flat ground, although this time he managed to walk away – albeit on unsteady legs – with only cuts to his face.

==== Safety issues arise ====
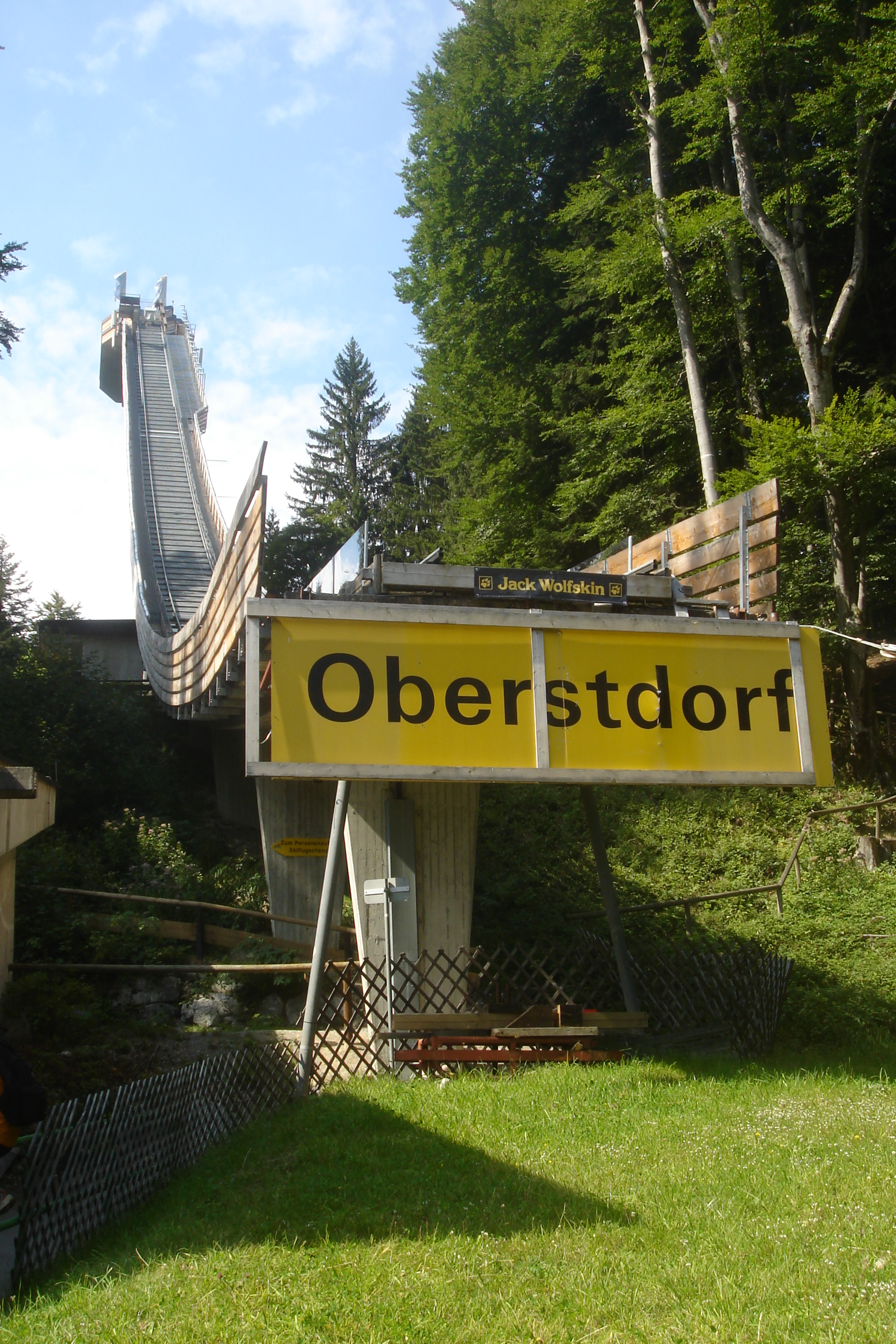
The inrun and table at Heini-Klopfer-Skiflugschanze in Oberstdorf, 2008

All these increasingly long distances came at a price, as illustrated by filmmaker Werner Herzog in his 1974 documentary The Great Ecstasy of Woodcarver Steiner. During both the aforementioned events in Oberstdorf and Planica, several athletes including Steiner had far exceeded the limits of the hill by 'out-jumping' it or 'running out of slope'. Jumps were much further than in the 1950s, when the old Kongsberger technique was still in use. The results were now potentially fatal each time, with athletes landing only metres away from completely flat ground. As early as 1941, The New York Times wrote:

The jumper's safety depends upon his making contact with the earth or snow at a sharp tangent, thus dissipating the terrific impact shock. Were a jumper to land on a flat expanse he would shatter every bone in his body. Such a fall would be comparable to leaping out of a seven-story building.

To make matters worse, only a wool cap and goggles – or no headgear at all – were worn; an antiquated feature left unchanged from the very earliest days of ski jumping more than 150 years prior. In 1979, at their 32nd International Ski Congress in Nice, France, the FIS mandated helmets to be worn by athletes at all ski jumping and flying events.

In Herzog's documentary, Steiner is shown to reflect with trepidation in Oberstdorf:

Ski flying has reached the point where it's beginning to present real dangers. We've just about reached the limit, I believe, as far as speed is concerned. ... Maybe I'd prefer to turn back [and] go back to flying off 150- or 130-metre hills, but it's the thrill of flying so far that nevertheless gives me a kick. (Note: Quoted directly from English subtitles.)

Further down the hill and pointing to a wooden marker indicating Steiner's failed efforts, Herzog explains solemnly:

This mark is, in fact, the point where ski flying starts to be inhuman. Walter Steiner was in very great danger. If he'd flown 10 m (33 ft) more, he'd have landed down here on the flat. Just imagine, it's like falling from a height of 110 m (360 ft) onto a flat surface: to a certain death. (Note: Quoted directly from English subtitles.)

In Planica, Herzog quoted Steiner as having said that he felt like he was in an arena with 50,000 people waiting to see him crash. On the third day of the event, while talking to journalists after a jump, Steiner appeared angered at the organisers' pressure on him to set more world records at the expense of his well-being: "They let me jump too far four times. That shouldn't happen. It's scandalous of those Yugoslav judges up there who are responsible." (Note: Quoted directly from English subtitles.)

The stalemate between the venues did not last long, as four world records were set in Oberstdorf within a span of four days in 1976, bringing the official figure up to 176 m (577 ft) set by Toni Innauer at the end of the event. Three years later, Planica drew level once again when Klaus Ostwald equalled the world record. Elsewhere, in the Western Hemisphere, the United States opened its own ski flying venue in 1970: Copper Peak in Ironwood, Michigan, had a K-point of 145 m, therefore not designed for world record distances from the outset. As of 2025 it remains the only ski flying hill to have been built outside of Europe.

=== 1980s ===
==== Harrachov joins in, Planica versus Oberstdorf continues ====
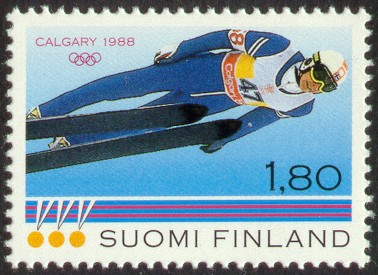
Stamp depicting Matti Nykänen in 1988

Planica and Oberstdorf briefly had a new challenger when the Čerťák K165 hill in Harrachov, Czech Republic (then a part of Czechoslovakia), was opened in 1980. For one year, all three venues shared the world record when Armin Kogler jumped 176 m at Harrachov's opening event. He improved this to 180 m (590 ft) in 1981, this time in Oberstdorf. Notably, at the 1980 Harrachov event, 16-year-old rookie Steve Collins won all three competitions with jumps consistently close to world record figures. At the 1983 Ski Flying World Championships, Pavel Ploc brought the world record back to Harrachov, which had since been upgraded to K180, by jumping 181 m (594 ft); this remains the last time a world record was set there.

The issue of safety in ski flying had resurfaced. In only a single day at the 1983 event, the hill in Harrachov – a location named "Devil's Mountain" – became notorious for causing many violent accidents. Horst Bulau crashed and suffered a concussion, while Steinar Bråten and Jens Weißflog also crashed. Ploc crashed in 1985 and Iztok Melin in 1989.

Over the next few years, the one-upmanship continued as the world record was again traded between Planica and Oberstdorf. In 1984, Matti Nykänen jumped 182 m (597 ft) twice on the same day in Oberstdorf. By improving this to 185 m (607 ft) the next day, Nykänen became the first athlete since Reidar Andersen in 1935 to set three world records in the space of 24 hours. It would be the end of an era as this was the last time a world record was set in Oberstdorf; altogether 21 were set there.

In 1985, to coincide with that year's Ski Flying World Championships, Planica underwent another upgrade to increase the K-point to 185 m. World records were again shattered as a result. Mike Holland first jumped 186 m (610 ft) to become the first American world record holder since Henry Hall in 1921, and the last to date. Nykänen would follow this up by landing a metre further. In the final round of that event, and in a show of dominance as he closed in on his second Ski Jumping World Cup title, Nykänen wowed the crowd with a jump of 191 m (627 ft) to punctuate his title win and effectively bring the Planica–Oberstdorf rivalry to a close.

Holland, who has said "Ski flying was my speciality", later described his own jump:

The world record jump was very smooth. It felt like I was lying on my stomach on a glass coffee table, watching a movie projected on a screen underneath the table. Although the flight was very smooth, it seemed like the movie projector was running the film faster than intended.

==== Safety issues reach their peak ====
Ulf Findeisen plummeting towards the hill in Kulm, 1986

The 1986 Ski Flying World Championships in Kulm highlighted the dangers of the sport in a most graphic way. In the second competition of the event, Andreas Felder equalled the world record to win the gold medal, ahead of Franz Neuländtner who won silver, and Nykänen who won bronze. Al Trautwig, commentating for American TV network ABC, described Nykänen as "perhaps the most talented ski flyer around." Former ski jumper Jeff Hastings, co-commentating, called him "the best 'aviator' out there today; he knows how to fly."

All of this was overshadowed by a series of horrific accidents which took place earlier. In treacherous crosswind conditions, Masahiro Akimoto lost control moments after takeoff, falling suddenly from a height of 9 m (30 ft) onto his back. He suffered a fractured ankle in addition to chest and shoulder injuries. A few minutes later, Rolf Åge Berg frighteningly lost control at the same height, at an estimated takeoff speed of 112 kilometres per hour (70 mph), but was able to land safely on both skis.

Immediately afterwards, Ulf Findeisen fell out of the air on his jump, crashing down face-first from 9 m and flipping head over heels repeatedly along the slope, only coming to a stop several seconds later. Trautwig likened Findeisen to "a ragdoll" after the fall. Hastings said: "I'm feeling a little sick to my stomach, Al. I can't believe this. I've never seen ski flying like this. So many falls." Findeisen was barely conscious and had to be stretchered away, later going into cardiac arrest but surviving.

In the final round of the competition, Berg attempted another jump but was not as fortunate this time: he fell out of the air, just as before, and crashed almost identically to Findeisen. One of Berg's skis, which had come loose after impact and was still attached to his foot, flailed around and hit him in the face – exposed after his goggles became detached – as he was sliding to a stop. His injuries, including concussion and a broken ACL, were career-ending. At this point, Trautwig began calling into question the nature of the sport: "Jeff, we talk about the fear and why the ski flyers are scared... I'm really starting to ask, why we're here and why they're doing it." Ernst Vettori, who was awaiting his own jump, withdrew from the event after witnessing the falls.

Ski flying endured a static era beginning in 1987, when Piotr Fijas set a world record of 194 m (636 ft) in Planica. With height over the hills (athletes were reaching 15 m (49 ft) in Planica) and takeoff speeds (Pavel Ploc reached 115.6 km/h (71.8 mph) in Harrachov in 1983) at an all-time high, as well as distances approaching 200 m (660 ft), the FIS took a stance against record-hunting for safety reasons. From Felder's world record in 1986 onwards, the FIS implemented a rule in which distance points would not be awarded beyond 191 m; the jump would still count, but no points further than that could be achieved. Per this rule, Fijas' jump was officially scaled down to 191 m by the FIS, but the KOP group (led by the organisers in Kulm, Oberstdorf and Planica) independently recorded the actual figure. Neither Kulm nor Planica would hold a ski flying event for several years, leaving Oberstdorf and Vikersund to host the Ski Flying World Championships in 1988 and 1990, respectively.

=== 1990s ===
==== New safety measures ====
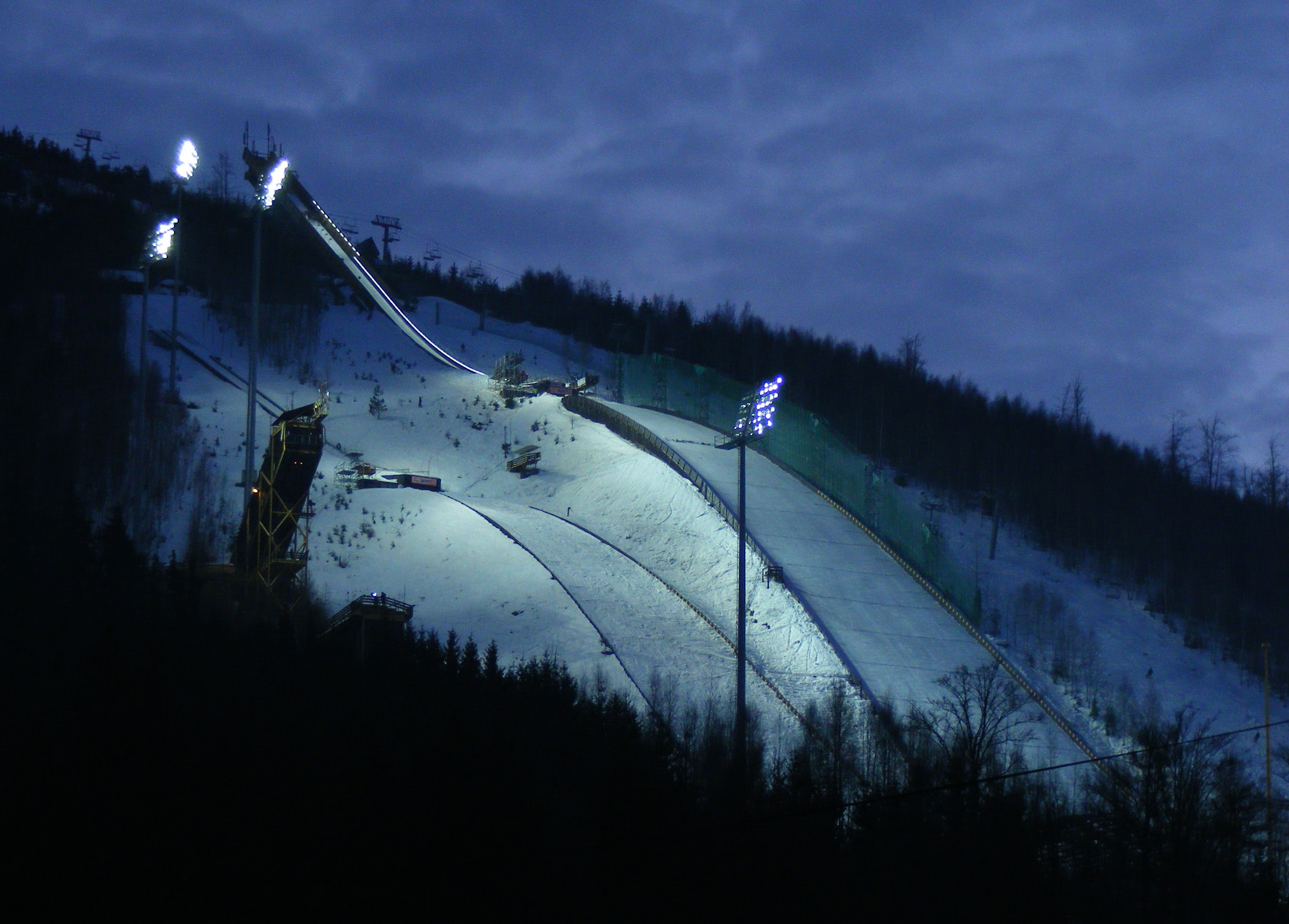
Ski jumping and flying hills at Čerťák in Harrachov, 2011. The modern curvature of the reprofiled slope can be seen on the flying hill (top), which used to be a much steeper drop.

The dangers of ski flying were still on full display at the 1992 Ski Flying World Championships in Harrachov, where Andreas Goldberger suffered a similar crash to the ones which occurred in Kulm in 1986. On the first day of the event, a few seconds into his second jump, dangerous wind conditions forced Goldberger to lose control at a height of around 9 m and a speed of more than 107.4 km/h (66.7 mph), sending him plummeting face-first onto the hill below. He was taken by helicopter to a hospital, having sustained a broken arm and collarbone, and a concussion. František Jež also crashed, but was able to walk away with some help.

The second and final day of the event was stopped due to worsened weather, culminating in a high-speed fall by Christof Duffner just as he landed a world record-equalling jump of 194 m, albeit rendered invalid because of the fall. With the event cancelled, Goldberger's efforts from earlier were enough to earn him a silver medal behind eventual winner Noriaki Kasai of Japan, who became the first non-European Ski Flying World Champion. Goldberger was able to return to top-level competition within less than a year.

Protective wind nets by the side of the hill were installed in Harrachov for 1996 to minimise the effects of crosswind, along with major reprofiling of the slope to comply with FIS safety regulations. This reprofiling – particularly at the hill's highest point, known as the knoll – was critical in reducing the fearsome height reached by athletes after takeoff, as high as 18 m (59 ft) in 1980. Thanks to these modifications, athletes no longer jumped with as much height as before.

Speaking about his experience at the 1983 Ski Flying World Championships in Harrachov, Mike Holland said:

Climbing over the knoll, I thought 'this is so damned high, I shouldn't be this high.' Since I wasn't ready for such height and speed, I threw out my arms at the end of the flight and let myself down 4 m (13 ft) short of the world record.

==== Technique changes: parallel to V-style ====
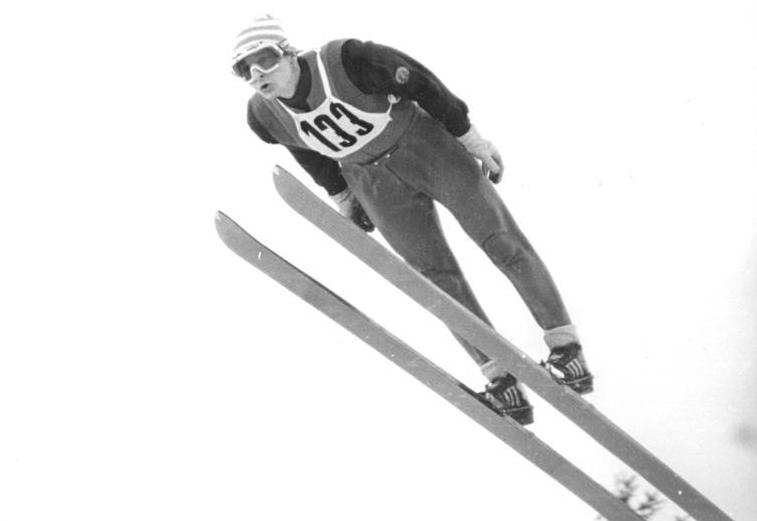
Hans-Georg Aschenbach using the parallel style, 1973

It was during this time that the entire sport of ski jumping underwent a significant transition in technique. Until the early 1990s nearly all athletes used the parallel style, in which the skis are held close together and parallel to each other. This had been the norm since the 1950s; Matti Nykänen created a variation in the 1980s with the skis pointed diagonally to the side in a crude attempt to increase surface area, yielding more distance. However, this came largely at the expense of stability and balance, akin to 'walking a tightrope' in mid-air and leaving athletes at the mercy of the elements. Akimoto, Findeisen, Berg and Goldberger's accidents were all caused by unpredictable gusts of wind that made them lose control at the highest and fastest stage of their jumps, exacerbated by an outdated technique ill-suited to the new extremes of ski flying, as well as the prevalence of older hills featuring very steep slopes.

In the late 1980s and early 1990s, Jan Boklöv pioneered the V-style: skis were instead spread outwards in an aerodynamic "V" shape, with the athlete's body lying much flatter between them. This created yet more surface area and lift, instantly enabling distances of up to ten per cent further. It also had a favourable effect of granting more stability in the air, although the peak speed was some 10 km/h (6.2 mph) slower than the parallel style. At first this new technique was looked upon unfavourably by the judges, who made it an issue to downgrade style points for those who used it. Nevertheless, within a few years, with Boklöv having won the 1988/89 Ski Jumping World Cup season and other athletes promptly adopting the technique, the judges' stance quietly eased and the V-style became the ubiquitous standard still used today.

The V-style itself had a transitional period of its own, going from a narrower "V" in the early to mid-1990s – which retained some features of the parallel style – to a much wider one at the end of the decade. Some athletes preferred to cross the back of the skis to exaggerate the "V" angle, while others leaned even more forward so that their body lay almost flat between the skis; both variations remain in use. The V-style is still not immune to failure if the air pressure under one ski is lost, but the results are much less catastrophic than with the parallel style; the latter had resulted in more head-first landings, whereas the V-style sees somewhat 'safer' landings on the back or shoulders. According to Mike Holland, "If you were hit by a gust of wind in the air, you would just flip over mid-flight", in reference to the parallel style.

==== Breaking the 200 metre barrier ====
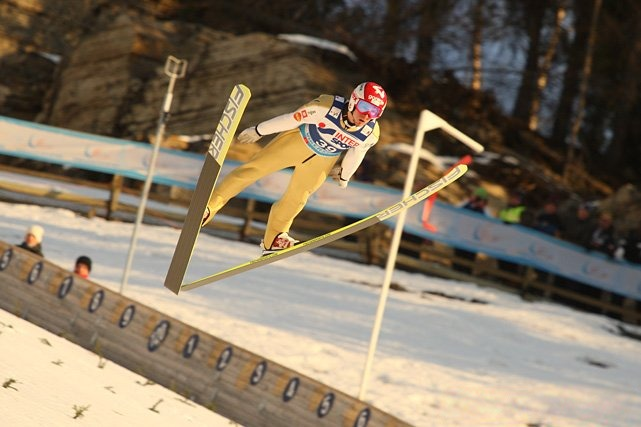
Robert Kranjec using a wide V-style with skis almost crossed at the back, 2012

In 1994, ski flying returned to a newly independent Slovenia, where the hill in Planica had been reprofiled with the aim of allowing for jumps of more than 200 m. The FIS was strongly against this and initially threatened to cancel the event on the grounds that its regulations on hill design had been violated. Negotiations between the organisers in Planica and the FIS managed to defuse the situation, allowing that year's Ski Flying World Championships to take place. Before the event, Espen Bredesen said: "Of course I want to be the first [to reach 200 m], but I think that 210 m (690 ft) or 215 m (705 ft) are also possible."

With most athletes having switched to the V-style, the sport was about to reach one of its biggest ever milestones. During the training round on the opening day of the event, Martin Höllwarth jumped 196 m (643 ft) to edge the world record ever closer to 200 m. This was the first time a world record had been set using the V-style, with Piotr Fijas' being the last to use the parallel style. Andreas Goldberger became the first ski jumper in history to cross the 200 m barrier when he landed at 202 m (663 ft) but failed to maintain his balance as he squatted down and touched the snow with his hands, rendering his jump an unofficial world record. The official honours went to Toni Nieminen only a short time later, who cleanly landed a jump of 203 m (666 ft) to claim the world record.

On the next day during the second training round, Christof Duffner almost had his moment of glory when he jumped 207 m (679 ft), but fell upon landing just as he had done two years earlier in Harrachov. In that same training round, Espen Bredesen claimed the world record for himself with a clean jump of 209 m (686 ft). The restrictive rule concerning jumps beyond 191 m, in place since 1986, was subsequently abolished by the FIS. However, as the rule was still in place at the time of Nieminen and Bredesen's jumps, their additional distances were nullified. This handed Jaroslav Sakala (with a jump of 185 m) the Ski Flying World Championship at the end of the event, which was shortened to only a single competition round due to strong winds forcing cancellation of the other. Jinya Nishikata and Johan Rasmussen each suffered heavy crashes due to these winds.

In 2014, Nieminen spoke about the jump that cemented his name in the history books:

It was the kind of jump in which, even when arriving [at the bottom of the hill] in the landing position and not knowing at all what lies ahead, I remember that my legs were trembling. That's how terrified I was. ... Overcoming your own fears is the best feeling. The nature of the sport is that one has to challenge themselves. That's why this jump has remained a highlight of my career. (Note: "Se oli sellainen hyppy, että vielä keulalle kun tuli laskuasennossa, eikä tiennyt yhtään mitä on vastassa, niin muistan kun jalat tärräsivät. Niin paljon hirvitti. ... Siitä juuri tulee ne parhaat fiilikset, että pystyy voittamaan omat pelot. Lajin luonne on sellainen, että on pakko haastaa itseään. Siksi tämä hyppy on jäänyt uralta kohokohtana mieleen.")

==== Planica dominates ====
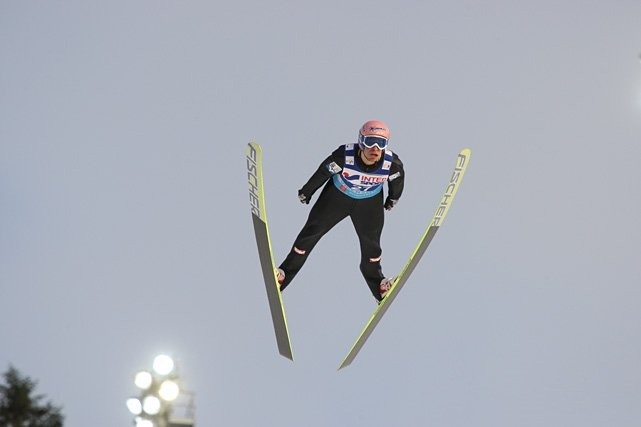
Andreas Kofler using a narrower "V" angle and skis uncrossed, 2012

Beginning with Fijas's world record in 1987, Planica enjoyed a very long period of exclusivity. Much like in the 1930s and 1940s, no other hills would come close to reclaiming the accolade for 24 years, despite nearly all receiving K-point upgrades to 185 m. Only Copper Peak remained unchanged at K145, staging its last event to date in 1994 with a hill record of 158 m (518 ft) shared between Werner Schuster and Mathias Wallner. Since then, the hill has served as a tourist attraction in which sightseers are able to access the top of the inrun via an elevator. In 2013, following almost two decades of disuse as a sporting venue, it was announced that the hill at Copper Peak would be renovated as the world's largest ski jumping hill, additionally capable of staging summer events.

With seven years between Fijas and Höllwarth's world records, it was the longest drought of unbroken records since that of Tauno Luiro from 1951 was broken by Jože Šlibar in 1961. The margin between Höllwarth and Nieminen's world records was 7 m (23 ft), the largest since Rudi Gering jumped 108 m and 118 m on the same day in 1941. In Planica the hill was reprofiled again in 1997, and the world record was broken a further four times in the remainder of the decade, culminating with Tommy Ingebrigtsen jumping 219.5 m (720 ft) in 1999 to send ski flying into the new millennium.

=== 2000s ===
In 2000, the world record in Planica was improved by 5.5 m (18 ft), with jumps of 224.5 m (737 ft) by Thomas Hörl and 225 m (738 ft) by Andreas Goldberger. The latter stood for three years until being equalled by Adam Małysz in 2003, but his achievement was only temporary. On the same day, and in a span of the next four, Matti Hautamäki set a hat-trick of world records of 227.5 m (746 ft), 228.5 m (750 ft) and 231 m (758 ft), much like Matti Nykänen had done in 1984. When interviewed after the event, Hautamäki said that "The longer one stays in the air, the more fun it is." (Note: "Mitä kauemmin pysyy ilmassa, sen hauskempaa.") Veli-Matti Lindström also jumped 232.5 m (763 ft) during a trial round but touched the snow upon landing.

Despite improvements in safety since the 1990s, Planica still saw several violent accidents occur in consecutive years: Valery Kobelev (1999), Takanobu Okabe (2000), Robert Kranjec (2001), and Tomasz Pochwała (2002) all crashed at the top of the knoll due to sudden losses of ski pressure.

Before the 2004 Ski Flying World Championships, the hill was renamed to Letalnica bratov Gorišek ("Flying hill by brothers Gorišek"). In 2005, Planica continued its dominance of ski flying. In the opening training round, Andreas Widhölzl crashed after a jump of 234.5 m (769 ft). In the finale, the world record was officially shattered four times on the same day when Tommy Ingebrigtsen, Bjørn Einar Romøren, and Matti Hautamäki all traded records of 231 m, 234.5 m, and 235.5 m (773 ft) respectively, with Romøren emerging victorious with a jump of 239 m (784 ft) to claim the final figure. Commentating for Finnish broadcaster MTV3, former world record holder Toni Nieminen remarked forebodingly after Romøren's jump that "the landing area is now practically completely flat ground." (Note: "Voidaan sanoa että laskeutumispaikka on käytännössä jo täysin tasamaalla.")

Some minutes following Romøren's jump, Janne Ahonen went for broke when he caught a massive thermal updraft and stretched out a jump of 240 m (790 ft), only to fall from a dangerous height and slam down hard onto near-flat ground. MTV3 commentator Jani Uotila called it "A horrendous jump! This is all getting too dangerous now!", (Note: "Kaamea hyppy! Nyt menee jo liian vaaralliseksi tämä touhu!") while co-commentator Nieminen explained that "When one comes down on flat ground, the impact is really hard." (Note: "Kun tullaan tasamaalle, niin toi isku on todella kova.") Ahonen was momentarily knocked out and his helmet had cracked, but he sustained no injuries. He was stretchered away and able to wave to the crowd, and returned later in the event to step onto the podium for winning his second consecutive World Cup title.

Ahonen's 240 m jump became part of ski flying legend when, in his 2009 autobiography Kuningaskotka, he revealed that he performed the feat while hung over from partying with team-mate Risto Jussilainen the previous night. After the crash, he refused treatment at Planica's medical facilities out of fear that his blood tests would show he was intoxicated.

In 2013, Ahonen talked about the consequences of not reining in the jump prematurely in the way he did: (Note: Verbatim transcription: "It will be like, 250 m, if I doesn't take it down. ... After 250, I will be a dead man.")

In the initial flight phase I thought, "Oh damn, now we're going far." Half way down the slope I got a warm feeling that, "Yes, now it's a world record. This is certain to be a new world record." Then as I flew further I realised, "Oh no, this is not going to end well. This is really not going to end well. I'm going to break my legs at the least." ... In reality I came down at 245 m (804 ft), but there was no more distance measuring equipment there. Experts have calculated that had I not brought down my jump, it would've flown at least 250 m (820 ft). (Note: "Alkuilmalennossa tuli ajatus, että ei vitsi, nyt lennetään pitkälle. Puolessa välissä rinnettä tuli lämmin ajatus, että jees, nyt tulee maailmanennätys, ihan varmasti tulee uusi maailmanennätys. ... Sitten lensin vielä pykälän eteenpäin, niin tajusin, että voi ei, nyt käy huonosti, nyt käy todella huonosti, jalat katkeaa vähintään. ... Tosiasiassa tulin alas 245 metrin kohdalla, mutta siellä ei ollut enää mittalaitteita. Asiantuntijat ovat laskeneet, että ilman sitä minun alasottoa hyppy olisi lentänyt ainakin 250 metriä.")

=== 2010s ===
==== Major hill upgrades begin, Vikersund re-emerges ====
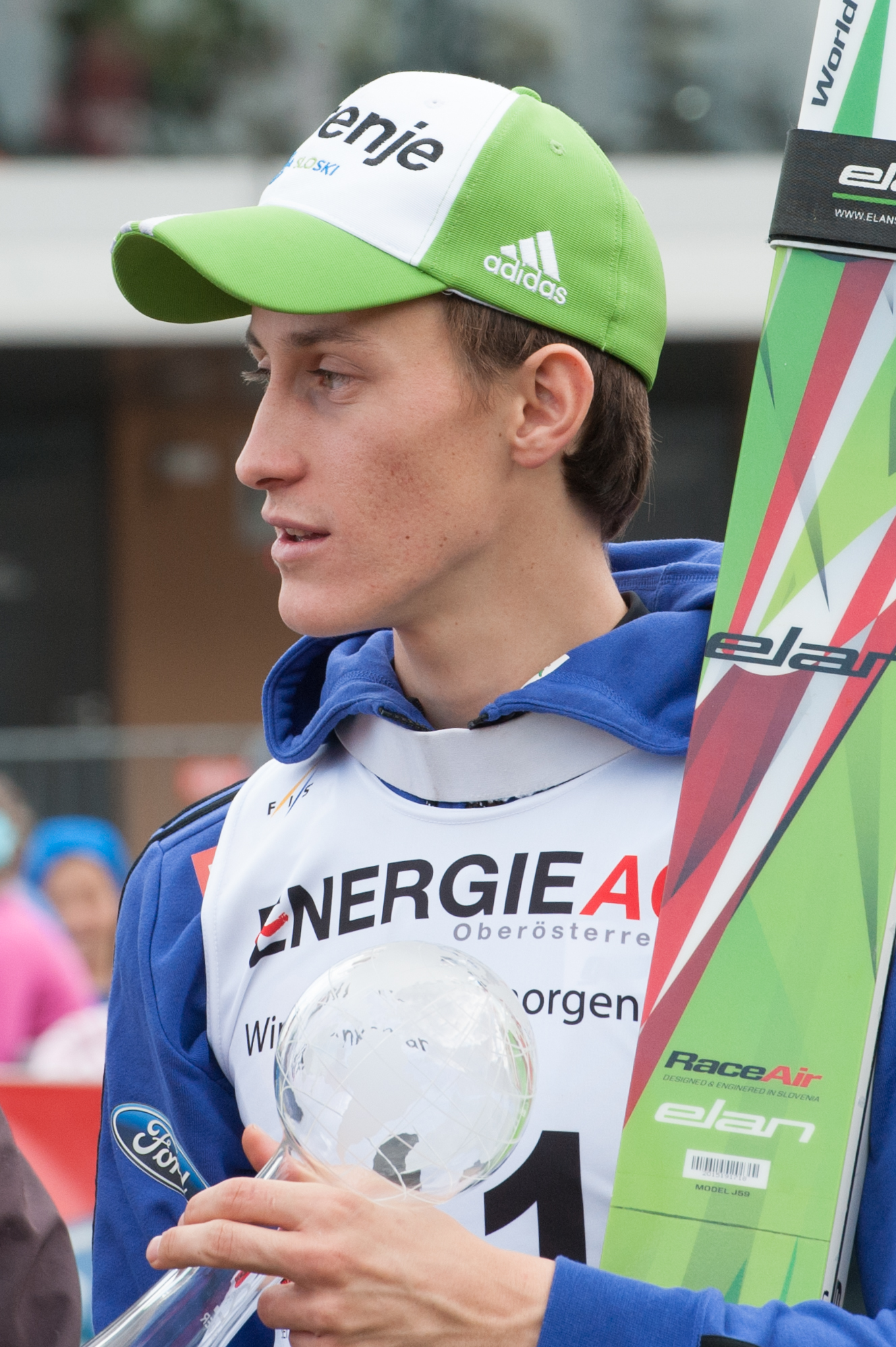
Peter Prevc was the first to land a jump of 250 m (820 ft)

In the aftermath of the Planica event and following numerous near-flat ground landings, it became clear that ski flying had once again outgrown an older hill and needed enlarging in the years to come. In 2005, almost immediately after the conclusion of the World Cup season, talks were under way to upgrade the hill in Vikersund. This became a reality in mid-2010, when the FIS announced major rule changes at the 47th International Ski Congress in Antalya, Turkey, to allow for ski flying hills to be constructed to their largest sizes yet.

Vikersund was the first to undergo renovation to increase its K-point from 185 m to 195 m (640 ft), making it the largest flying hill in the world for several years, and the first one equipped for floodlit night events. Janez Gorišek, known for his expertise in ski flying hill design, was the leader of this project. Anticipating a renewed world record rivalry, organisers in Vikersund welcomed the healthy competition with Planica. The new facility was given a rousing introduction at its opening event in 2011, when Johan Remen Evensen jumped 243 m (797 ft) and 246.5 m (809 ft), returning the world record to Vikersund for the first time since 1967. This served as a preparation event for the 2012 Ski Flying World Championships, which went on to draw a crowd of 60,000.

==== Breaking the 250 metre barrier ====
Another K-point modification in Vikersund (this time to 200 m) resulted in the coveted 250 m barrier being reached in 2015, with Peter Prevc landing a clean jump right on the mark to claim another historic milestone in the sport. Prevc's triumph was short-lived when Anders Fannemel broke this figure only a day later, landing a jump of 251.5 m (825 ft). At the same event, prior to Fannemel's jump, Dmitry Vassiliev crashed hard onto near-flat ground at 254 m (833 ft) in a similar way to Janne Ahonen in Planica a decade earlier; this gave Vassiliev unofficially the furthest distance ever reached in ski flying until 2025.

==== Further hill upgrades ====
Between 2015 and 2017, upgrades from K185 to K200 were also completed in Kulm, Planica, and Oberstdorf. In 2018, the hill sizes on all active flying hills were upgraded to 235–240 m, making them fully equipped for jumps exceeding those distances (previous hill records were broken at each opening event), as well as having improved facilities for athletes and spectators. Harrachov remains the only hill, at K185, to have not been upgraded in any major way since the 1990s. Although the new hills are much larger than ever before, they generally feature longer and less steeply angled slopes.

Inrun tables have also been placed further back from the knoll and flight curves made shallower in order to allow athletes to glide more efficiently and safely along the contour of the slope. This has significantly reduced such precarious heights over the knoll as was the case in the early 1990s and prior: in that era, athletes using the parallel style would jump in a more upward trajectory off the table, reaching vast heights but at the expense of distance; and rather than glide, they instead plummeted towards the slope. Today, Kulm and Planica remain extremely steep in the flight phase; Oberstdorf and Vikersund, by comparison, have longer slopes and do not enable as much height over the knoll.

At the end of the 2015 World Cup season, following Prevc and Fannemel's world records, then-FIS race director Walter Hofer stated that the limit had been reached on the newest hills, and that no further expansion to their size was expected in the near future. He also noted in 2011 that the FIS rules on hill sizes would likely remain unchanged for another decade. Despite this, Janez Gorišek has made plans for a 300 m (980 ft) hill in Planica, albeit put on hold until the FIS rules are again changed. Fannemel said in 2015 that he believed 252 m (827 ft) was the limit in Vikersund, but that the world record could be broken again in Planica.

==== Beyond 250 metres ====
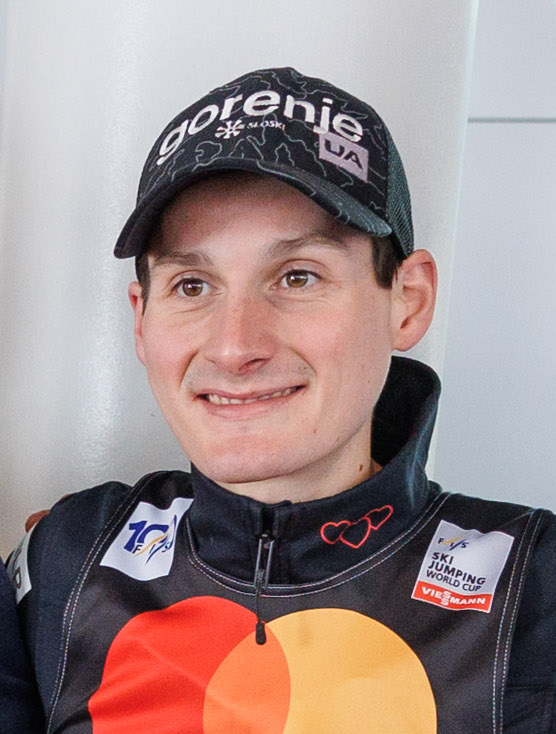
Domen Prevc has held the world record of 254.5 m (835 ft) since March 2025

In 2016, rookie athlete Tilen Bartol came close to setting a new world record during a trial round in Planica, but crashed in a very dangerous way onto near-flat ground at 252 m and almost broke his neck. In 2017, Robert Johansson landed an official world record of 252 m in Vikersund, which was broken only half an hour later by Stefan Kraft with a jump of 253.5 m (832 ft), only half a metre short of Dmitry Vassiliev's unofficial distance from 2015. The Vikersund event was staged as the finale of the inaugural Raw Air tournament, which was won by Kraft. He said of his world record:

I knew the ramp in Vikersund can jump pretty darn far. It was an incredible flight and it was important that I was able to do it. During the flight, I thought "it's now or never."

Although his achievement initially came under scrutiny, as it appeared that he touched the snow with his backside as he was forced to squat down on essentially flat ground, slow-motion replay confirmed that his landing was valid with only millimetres to spare. A week later, Planica caught up to Vikersund with a plethora of more personal bests, and three athletes – including Kraft, twice – landing jumps of, or beyond, 250 m. Kamil Stoch would set a hill record of 251.5 m, with the season finale competition drawing an attendance of 16,500. In 2018, in Planica, Gregor Schlierenzauer equalled the world record of 253.5 m but touched the snow with his hands upon landing.

=== 2020s ===
In 2024, Red Bull organised a two-day event on a specially constructed hill in Hlíðarfjall, Iceland, in which Ryōyū Kobayashi made four jumps to unofficially eclipse the world record: 256 m (840 ft), 259 m (850 ft), 282 m (925 ft), and finally 291 m (955 ft).

In 2025, Domen Prevc set a new official world record in Planica, landing a jump of 254.5 m (835 ft). This eight-year gap between world records was the longest since Piotr Fijas' record in 1987 was broken by Martin Höllwarth in 1994. It also ended a fourteen-year drought of world records at the Letalnica hill, the longest in its history.

In October 2025, the Planica Nordic Centre announced that Letalnica is to be upgraded for jumps of up to 270 m (890 ft) by 2027, in line with new FIS regulations.

== Differences from ski jumping ==
=== Technique ===
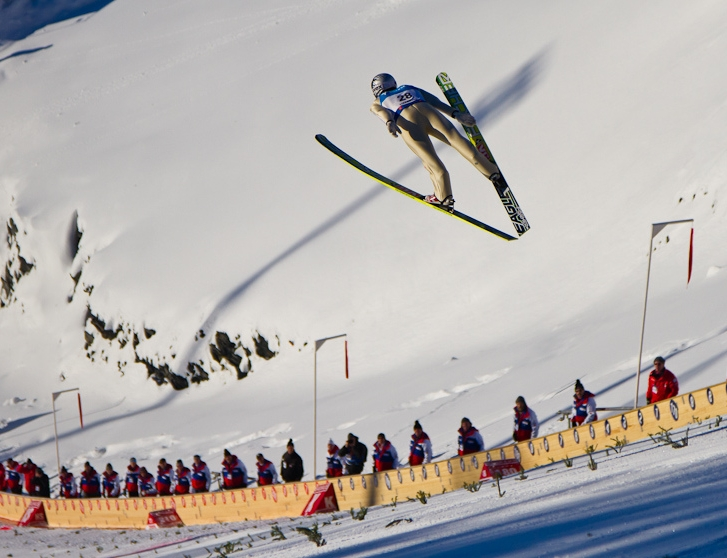
Anders Jacobsen in Vikersund, 2011

Ski flyers take off at speeds of 96–110 km/h (60–68 mph), gliding as high as 10 m (33 ft) above the slope, accelerating to 120–133 km/h (75–83 mph) before landing, and spending almost 10 seconds in the air. All these figures are considerably less in ski jumping. David Goldstrom, longtime commentator for Eurosport, has likened the appearance of ski flying to that of "flying like a bird".

Unlike ski jumping, which can be contested in the summer on specially equipped hills with plastic surfaces, ski flying is strictly a winter sport and not part of the Winter Olympics; no world records have therefore been set in the history of the Olympics. Also in contrast to ski jumping, athletes are not able to practice on ski flying hills out of season, as they are sanctioned only for competition events. Among the Alpine countries there was an unwritten gentlemen's agreement forbidding athletes under the age of 18 to participate in ski flying events, but an exception was made for 17-year-old Domen Prevc in 2017.

Rather than being considered a separate sport on its own, ski flying is essentially an offshoot of ski jumping involving larger hills and longer jump distances. Former US national ski jumping coach Larry Stone has said, "It's the same thing, just bigger. You're going faster and flying higher... Basically, it's just a real big jump." Ski jumping coach Thomas Thurnbichler has said, "In [an athlete's] first years of ski flying, I think everybody up there is a little scared. And everybody who says he's not is just a liar! [laughs]" Former ski jumper Jernej Damjan has said that athletes have to specifically adapt their technique from ski jumping to ski flying, as well as there being a lower margin for error compared to ski jumping. He also says:

Ski flying is just a little bit different than ski jumping. ... It's really important that you keep all the speed and all the smoothness in your movement because every unnecessary move can make you lose the speed."

The competitive standard for jump distances in ski flying is in the range of 230–240 m, with 254.5 m being the absolute longest distance reached to date at an official competition, at Planica in Slovenia. By comparison, distances of 120–140 m (390–460 ft) are the standard on most ski jumping hills, with the longest distance to date being 155.5 m (510 ft), set at Mühlenkopfschanze in Germany.

=== Hills ===
The main difference between ski flying and ski jumping is the hill design, as mandated by the FIS. Historically, hills with a K-point – or target landing zone – of more than 145 m were classed as ski flying hills. As jump distances increased by the decade, so did a small number of unique hills at locations seeking to outdo each other in a friendly rivalry for world record honours. Since 1980, there have only been five of these hills in Europe and one in the US.

On all active ski flying hills, the K-point is set at 200 m; far greater than the largest ski jumping hills, which only have K-points of up to 130 m (430 ft). The hill size, which is the total length of the slope from the table down to a certain distance beyond the K-point, is set between 235–240 m on ski flying hills; on ski jumping hills it is a maximum of 145 m (476 ft). In the landing zone, the angle of a ski flying hill is between 33.2–35 degrees. (Note: Vikersund has the shallowest slope; Planica has the steepest.)

Ski flying inruns are 117.4–133.8 m (385–439 ft) in length, (Note: Kulm has the shortest inrun length; Planica has the longest.) inclined at an angle of 35–38.7 degrees. (Note: Harrachov has the shallowest inrun incline; Oberstdorf has the steepest.) The longest inrun on a ski jumping hill is 100 m, at Mühlenkopfschanze. Since the late 1980s, when the V-style began enabling jumps dangerously close to flat ground, full inrun lengths have never been used at ski flying events due to safety reasons.

Seven ski flying hills in total were constructed between 1934 and 1980, with subsequent renovations being made in the decades since. Four are currently in use. The joint largest hills in the world are Vikersundbakken in Norway and Letalnica bratov Gorišek in Slovenia. The joint second largest are Kulm in Austria and Heini-Klopfer-Skiflugschanze in Germany. Vikersundbakken and Letalnica are differently designed, with Letalnica enabling much higher and faster jumps, with consequently a harder landing.

Opened	Status	Hill name	Location	K-point	Hill size	Hill record holder	Hill record distance	Ref.
1934	Active	Bloudkova velikanka (Note: Recategorised as a ski jumping hill after Letalnica bratov Gorišek came into use.)	(Slovenia) Planica	K130	HS 140	(Japan) Noriaki Kasai (Note: Last hill record holder until the venue fell into disuse; does not apply to the current version of the hill.)	147.5 m (484 ft)	
1936	Active	Vikersundbakken (Note: Recategorised from a ski jumping hill to a flying hill after renovation in 1966.)	(Norway) Vikersund	K200	HS 240	(Austria) Stefan Kraft	253.5 m (832 ft)	
1950	Active	Kulm	(Austria) Bad Mitterndorf	K200	HS 235	(Slovenia) Domen Prevc	245.5 m (805 ft)	
1950	Active	Heini-Klopfer-Skiflugschanze	(Germany) Oberstdorf	K200	HS 235	(Slovenia) Domen Prevc	242.5 m (796 ft)	
1969	Active	Letalnica bratov Gorišek	(Slovenia) Planica	K200	HS 240	(Slovenia) Domen Prevc	254.5 m (835 ft)	
1970	Inactive	Copper Peak (Note: Not in use since 1994. The organisers have since decided to renovate the facility with the capability of staging summer events.)	(United States) Ironwood, Michigan	K145	HS 175	(Austria) Werner Schuster (Austria) Mathias Wallner	158 m (518 ft)	
1980	Inactive	Čerťák (Note: Not in use since 2014.)	(Czech Republic) Harrachov	K185	HS 210	(Finland) Matti Hautamäki (Austria) Thomas Morgenstern	214.5 m (704 ft)	

==== Proposals ====
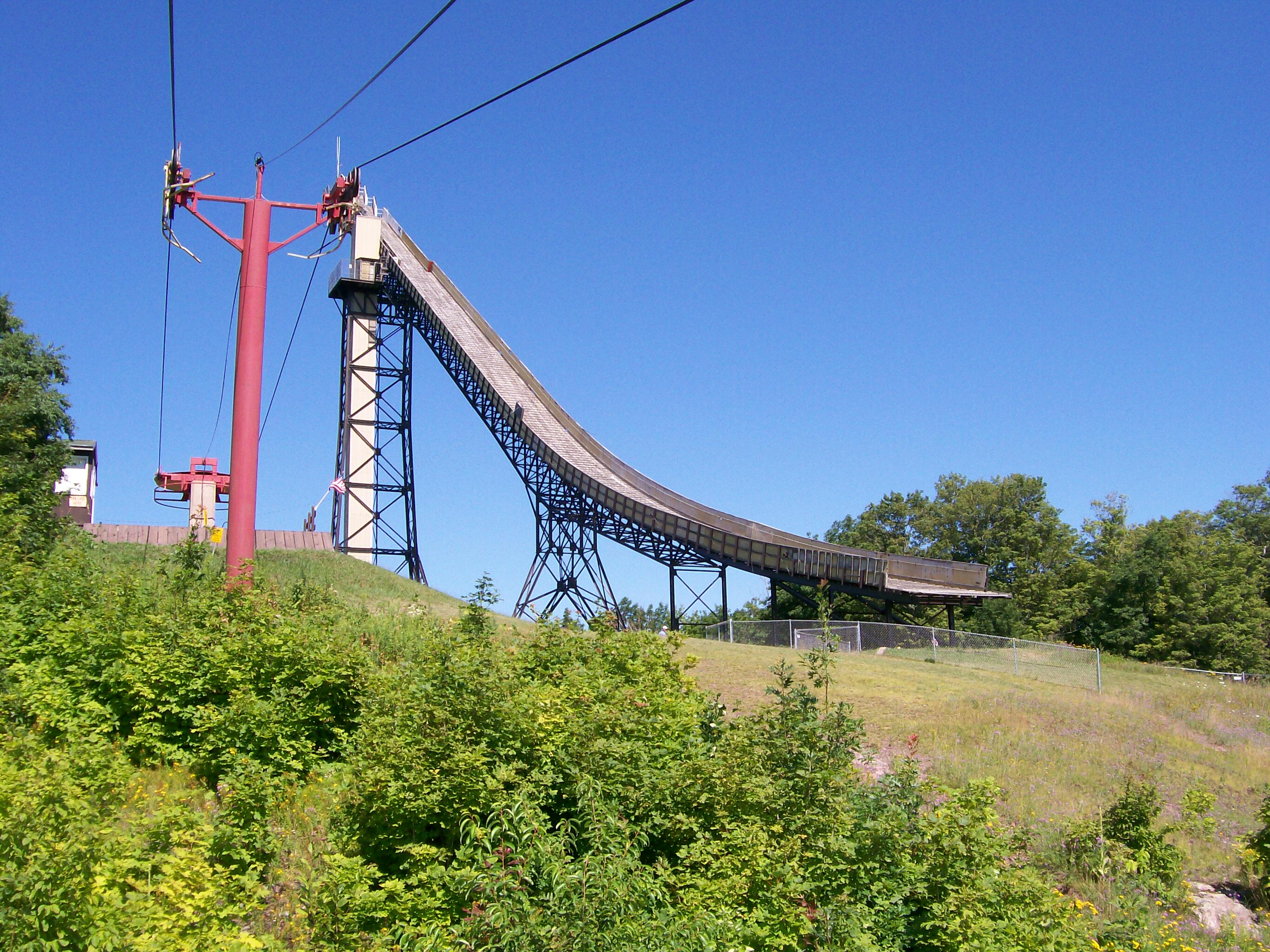
The inrun at Copper Peak in Ironwood, Michigan, 2008

There have been a number of proposed ski flying hills, most of which never reached the construction stage. Two were announced in 2007 in Finland, in Kemijärvi and Ylitornio, but neither project was realized. In Norway, prior to the renovation of Vikersund, there were serious talks about constructing a new ski flying hill at Rødkleiva in Oslo. The most recent proposal came from China, in 2016, which reached the development stages for a ski jumping and flying hill complex at the Wangtiane ski resort in the Changbai Mountains.

Copper Peak, the only ski flying hill built outside of Europe, has undergone various development plans seeking to return the venue to active status.

=== Events ===
The most prestigious event in ski flying is the World Championships, which was first held in Planica in 1972 and has been staged biennially since 1988, in a rotating schedule at all hills except Copper Peak. The World Championships replaced various incarnations of International Ski Flying Week, which ran from 1953 to 1989. Gold, silver and bronze medals are awarded after two competitions, with the total points winner receiving the title of Ski Flying World Champion. A team competition was introduced in 2004, in which medals are also awarded.

Ski flying events outside of the World Championships are a regular feature on the Ski Jumping World Cup calendar, usually occurring on two or three hills; unusually, the 2018 season staged events on four hills (one as part of the World Championships, three in the World Cup). Even more unusually, during the 2021 season which was affected by the COVID-19 pandemic, Planica hosted the World Championships near the start of the season, and the World Cup to conclude the season.

Because athletes almost always participate in both disciplines, points scored in ski flying also count towards the Ski Jumping World Cup standings. From 1991 to 2001, and from 2009 onwards, an additional title and trophy for the Ski Flying World Cup has been awarded at the end of each season to the overall points winner of solely ski flying competitions, even if only one took place.

=== Scoring ===
Ski flying uses the same points system as ski jumping, but with two differences. In ski jumping, an athlete who reaches the K-point receives 60 points as a base mark for distance; in ski flying it is 120 points. For every metre beyond the K-point, bonus points are awarded. In ski jumping, a metre has a value of 2 points for normal hills and 1.8 points for large hills; in ski flying, a metre is worth 1.2 points.

== Women in ski flying ==
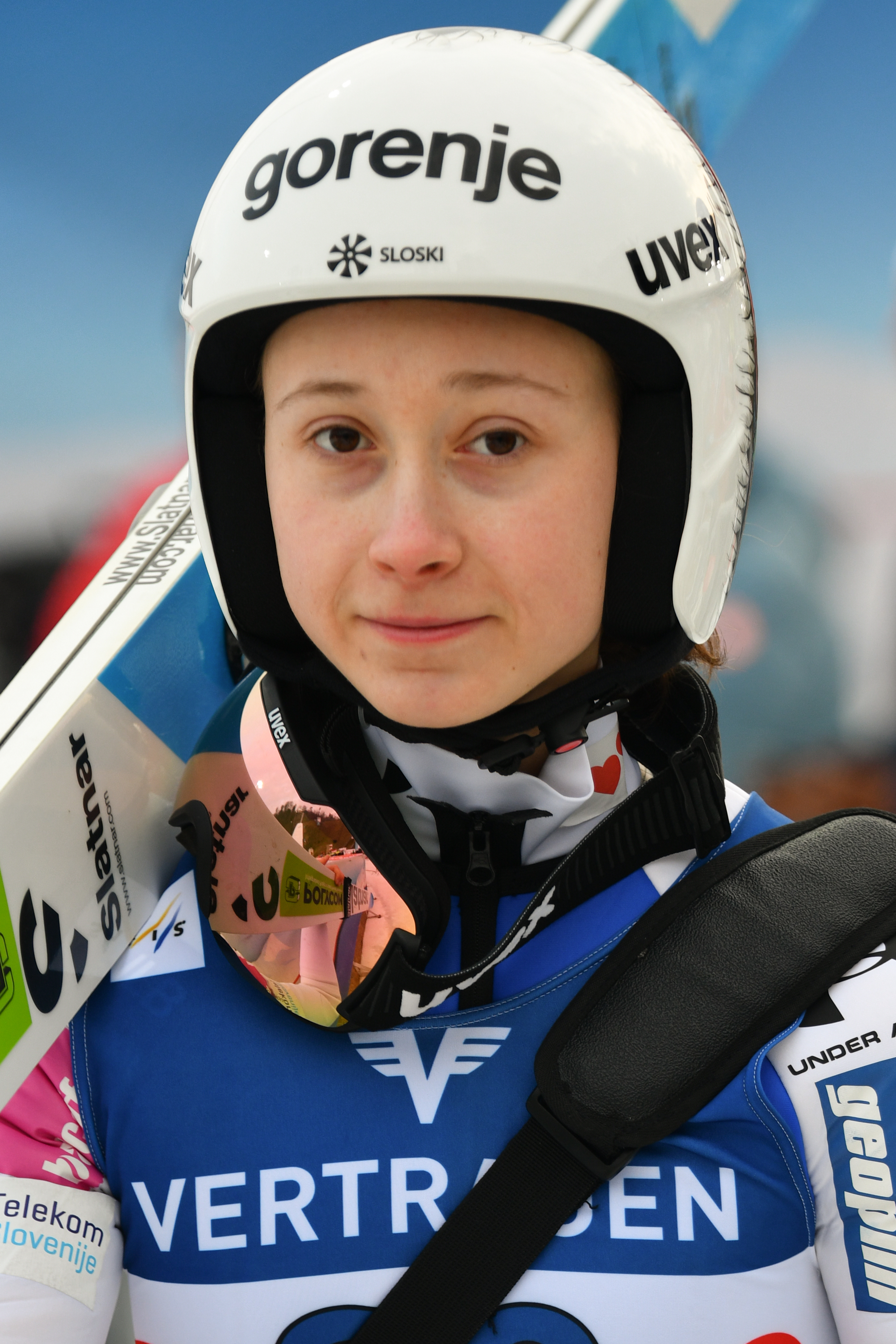
Nika Prevc has held the women's world record since March 2025

Until the early 2020s, women had a very limited presence in ski flying. In 1997, Eva Ganster set an unprecedented six world records for women (an amount since unmatched by any woman or man) in a span of five days in Kulm, bringing her personal best to a final figure of 167 m (548 ft). This achievement earned her a place in the Guinness World Records. Six years later, also in Kulm, Daniela Iraschko-Stolz set a women's world record of 200 m, which stood until 2023.

In 2004, four female athletes – Anette Sagen, Helena Olsson Smeby, Line Jahr, and Lindsey Van – were invited to perform test jumps prior to the men's 2004 Continental Cup event in Vikersund. However, this was initially blocked by Torbjørn Yggeseth, founder of the World Cup and a member of the FIS technical committee at the time, on the grounds that it was too dangerous to allow women on ski flying hills. Sagen challenged this and eventually won the right to jump from the hill, along with her fellow athletes. Both Sagen and Smeby jumped 174.5 m (573 ft). Van completed two more jumps in Vikersund in 2009, after which ski flying test jumps for women were discontinued.

Several years after women were first allowed to participate in the World Cup for the 2011–12 season, former World Cup champions Sarah Hendrickson, Sara Takanashi, and Maren Lundby all expressed a desire to try ski flying. In 2021, the FIS held a vote on a proposal to allow women on flying hills in time for the 2022 Raw Air tournament in Vikersund. The proposal was turned down by a vote of 9–7 against. Included amongst the nations who voted against were Austria, Germany and Poland; Norway were strongly in support. Jessica Jerome, Lundby and Hendrickson were disappointed with the decision, while Bertil Pålsrud (a member of the FIS equipment committee) said he was confident of Vikersund staging a ski flying event for women in 2023. In the meantime, it was announced that women would compete for the first time on the world's largest ski jumping hill in Willingen during the 2021–22 World Cup season. Due to its size, Willingen has been described as essentially a "small flying hill", which would serve as preparation for women's ski flying events.

A year later, the FIS Sub-Committee voted unanimously in favour of women participating in ski flying. Their proposal was to stage a competition in Vikersund for the top 15 female ski jumpers, as part of the 2023 Raw Air tournament. Responding to this news, Lindsey Van said, "It is a huge step forward in the progression of the sport – there have only been seven women to go ski flying in the history of the sport, so it's a big deal. Ski flying is the pinnacle of the sport." Ema Klinec went on to win the first ever women's ski flying competition in Vikersund, during which the women's world record was broken four times – Klinec achieving this twice, with jumps of 203 m and 226 m.

In March 2025, Nika Prevc and Domen Prevc became the first siblings to hold the women's and men's world records simultaneously. Nika landed a jump of 236 m (774 ft) in Vikersund, followed by Domen landing 254.5 m in Planica a month later.

The 2025–26 World Cup season saw women jumping in Planica for the first time.

== Norway–Slovenia rivalry ==
Ever since its inception in 1936, ski flying has centred around Slovenia, and more recently Norway. The very first recorded jumps of 100 and 200 m, together with a total of 41 world records, have been set on two different hills in the Alpine valley of Planica: Bloudkova velikanka, which has since been reconfigured as a ski jumping large hill, and its successor Letalnica bratov Gorišek, dubbed the "monster hill". Since 1997, with very few exceptions, the Ski Jumping World Cup has traditionally held its season finale in Planica. This takes place usually on Letalnica, but is occasionally moved to Bloudkova (most recently in 2014, during renovation at Letalnica).

After being renovated in 2011, Vikersundbakken in the Norwegian town of Vikersund became the world's pre-eminent ski flying hill, and the rivalry with Planica was renewed after more than twenty years of the latter's dominance of world records. Six world records have been set in Vikersund, which has also been dubbed the Monsterbakken ("monster hill"). All world records from 1987 onwards have been set exclusively in Planica and Vikersund.

Slovenian athletes were highly successful in Planica between 2012 and 2016, holding a near-lockout on the top spot in individual and team competitions. The four-day event in 2016 drew a total of 110,000 spectators, many of them Slovenians celebrating Peter Prevc's World Cup title victory. Since 2016, Norway has led the way in individual and team competitions, having won four gold medals (three team, one individual) at the Ski Flying World Championships, and dominating 2018 in terms of the World Championships and Ski Flying World Cup.

When distances beyond 200 m were first reached in 1994, Norwegians have been the most prolific world record setters, with eleven records set by seven athletes as of March 2017. In contemporary women's ski flying, since the discipline became part of their World Cup season, four world records have been set by two Slovenian athletes; Norwegians have the next most, with two.

== Accidents ==
Due to the extreme speeds and heights involved, coupled with potentially hazardous and unpredictable wind conditions, ski flying has long had a reputation for being highly dangerous. It has been described as an extreme sport and in terms such as "simply insane", "ski jumping on Red Bull", and the "gnarlier, even more dangerous, faceplant-ridden cousin" of ski jumping. Although there have been no recorded fatalities, many serious accidents – known as "falls" or "crashes" – have occurred throughout its history on every hill. Some of these have been career-ending, such was the case for Rolf Åge Berg in 1986, Arthur Khamidulin in 2000, and Lukas Müller in 2016.

As jumps have increased in distance, sometimes the absolute hill limit – designated as the fall line – is exceeded. This is known as "out-jumping the hill", "landing on the flat", or in the worst case a "flat-ground crash", which occurs when an athlete jumps too far beyond the safety of the slope and lands near, or onto, completely flat ground.

== In other media ==
- From 1970 to 1998, Vinko Bogataj's crash in Oberstdorf was featured prominently on the opening montage of ABC's Wide World of Sports in the United States.
- The career of Walter Steiner and his quest for a ski flying world record was documented in the 1974 film, The Great Ecstasy of Woodcarver Steiner, by filmmaker Werner Herzog.

== See also ==
- FIS Ski Flying World Championships
- FIS Ski Flying World Cup
- List of longest ski jumps
