= Fred Berger =

Fred Berger may refer to:

- Fred Berger (actor) (1894–?), Austrian-born actor in British films
- Fred Berger (politician) (1932–2009), Canadian politician
- Fred Berger (producer) (born 1981), American film producer
- Fred W. Berger (1908–2003), American film editor
- Frédéric Berger (born 1964), French former ski jumper
