= Fijas (surname) =

Fijas is a surname. Notable people with the surname include:

- Piotr Fijas (born 1958), Polish ski jumper
- Tadeusz Fijas (born 1960), Polish ski jumper, brother of Piotr
