= Mika Kojonkoski =

Finnish ski jumping coach and politician

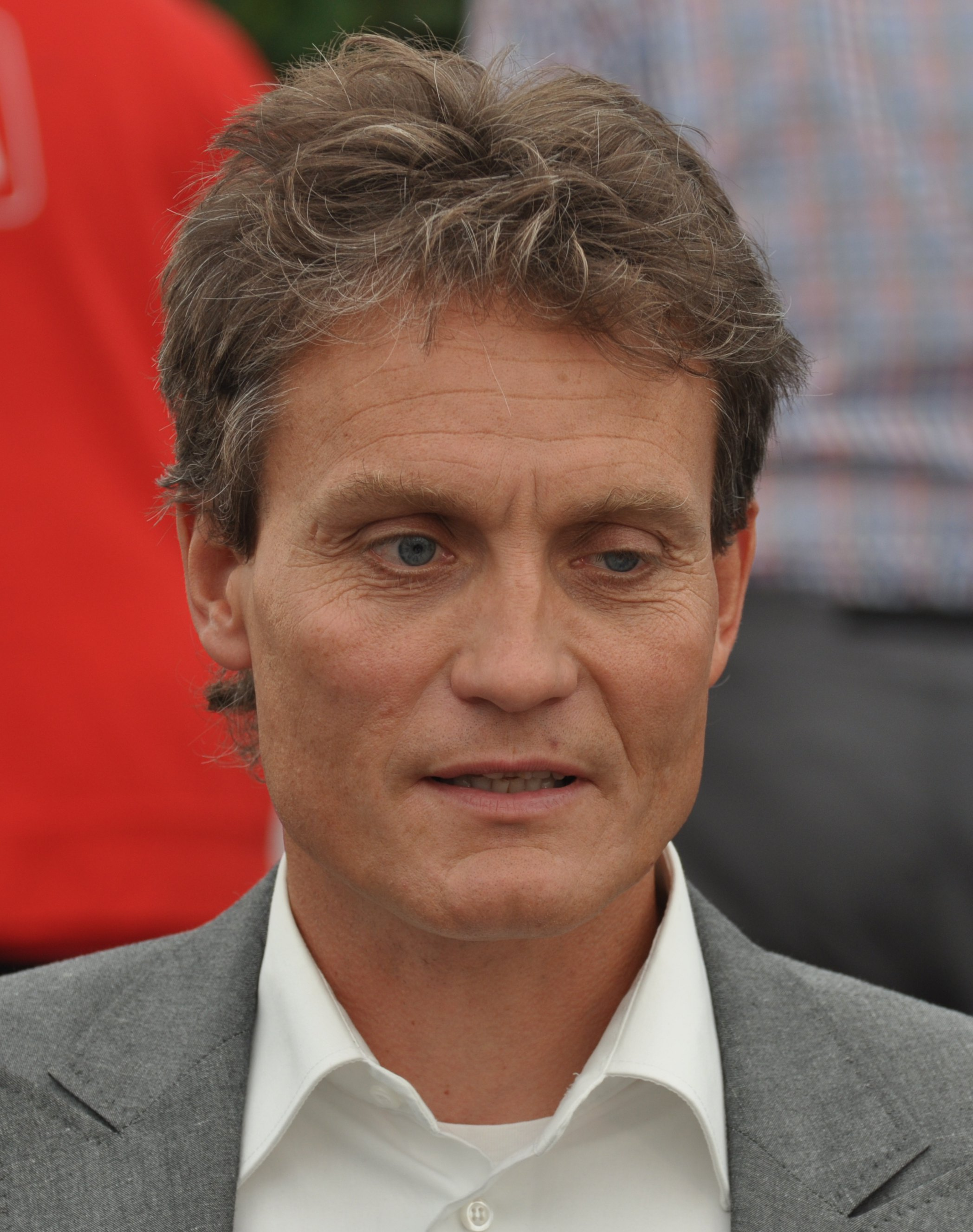
Mika Kojonkoski in 2012.

Mika Kojonkoski (born 19 April 1964 in Rauma, Finland) is a Finnish ski jumping coach and politician. Kojonkoski was a ski jumper himself in the 1980s, but he never reached the level of the best Finnish jumpers like Matti Nykänen. His best result was his 9th place in Chamonix, he also achieved a 16th place in the 1985 Ski flying World Championships in Planica.

Kojonkoski quickly became a known figure as a ski coach. After starting up as coach of Finland's junior team, Kojonkoski was hired as the new Austrian coach in 1997. He returned home to Finland to take over the national team in 1999, before he took over the Norwegian team in 2002 where he helped create stars like Sigurd Pettersen, Lars Bystøl, Bjørn Einar Romøren, Anders Jacobsen and Tom Hilde.

Kojonkoski is an active politician in his hometown of Kuopio, where he represents the National Coalition Party.

== Personal life ==
Mika has three children with his wife Ulla.

== National teams coached ==
Team	Years
Austria	1997–1999
Finland	1999–2002
Norway	2002-2011
