= Jiří Parma =

Czech former ski jumper (born 1963)

Personal information
- Nationality: Czechoslovakia; Czech Republic
- Born: 9 January 1963 (age 63) Frenštát pod Radhoštěm, Czechoslovakia
- Height: 174 cm (5 ft 9 in)

Sport
- Sport: Skiing

World Cup career
- Seasons: 1981; 1983–1996
- Indiv. starts: 229
- Indiv. podiums: 17
- Indiv. wins: 3
- Team starts: 6
Medal record
Men's ski jumping
Olympic Games
Bronze medal – third place	1992 Albertville	Team LH
FIS Nordic World Ski Championships
Gold medal – first place	1987 Oberstdorf	Individual NH
Silver medal – second place	1993 Falun	Team LH
Bronze medal – third place	1984 Engelberg	Team LH
Bronze medal – third place	1989 Lahti	Team LH
- Updated on 10 February 2016

Jiři Parma (Czech pronunciation: [ˈjɪr̝iː ˈparma], born 9 January 1963) is a Czech former ski jumper.

== Career ==
At the 1992 Winter Olympics in Albertville, he won a bronze medal in the team large hill. Parma's biggest successes were at the FIS Nordic World Ski Championships, where he earned four medals. This included one gold (1987: Individual normal hill), one silver (1993: Team large hill), and two bronzes (1984, 1989: Team large hill).

He also had three individual career world cup wins (2 in 1984, and 1 in 1985).

== World Cup ==
=== Standings ===
Season	Overall	4H	SF	JP
1980/81	—	68	N/A	N/A
1982/83	27	25	N/A	N/A
1983/84	5	44	N/A	N/A
1984/85	5	10	N/A	N/A
1985/86	9	23	N/A	N/A
1986/87	9	17	N/A	N/A
1987/88	4	3rd place, bronze medalist(s)	N/A	N/A
1988/89	15	37	N/A	N/A
1989/90	31	35	N/A	N/A
1990/91	29	22	—	N/A
1991/92	15	—	22	N/A
1992/93	17	19	—	N/A
1993/94	19	15	—	N/A
1994/95	31	26	38	N/A
1995/96	73	—	—	71

=== Wins ===
No.	Season	Date	Location	Hill	Size
1	1983/84	14 January 1984	(Czechoslovakia) Harrachov	Čerťák K120	LH
2	1983/84	6 March 1984	(Sweden) Falun	Lugnet K89	NH
3	1984/85	5 March 1985	(Sweden) Örnsköldsvik	Paradiskullen K82	NH
