= Halvor Persson =

Norwegian ski jumper (born 1966)

Personal information
- Full name: Halvor Persson
- Born: 11 March 1966 (age 60)

Sport
- Sport: Skiing
- Club: Bærums SK

World Cup career
- Seasons: 1985–1986; 1988; 1990
- Indiv. podiums: 1
- Updated on 30 Mar 2015

Halvor Persson (born 11 March 1966) is a Norwegian former ski jumper.
