= Trond Jøran Pedersen =

Norwegian ski jumper

Personal information
- Full name: Trond Jøran Pedersen
- Nationality: Norway
- Born: 19 June 1958 (age 68)

Sport
- Sport: Skiing

World Cup career
- Seasons: 1985–1988
- Indiv. podiums: 1
- Updated on 30 Mar 2015

Trond Jøran Pedersen (born 19 June 1958) is a Norwegian former ski jumper. He coached the Norwegian national team, including at the 1994 Winter Olympics.
