= 1984–85 FIS Ski Jumping World Cup =

Ski jumping world cup season

1984–85 World Cup
Winners
- Overall: (Finland) Matti Nykänen
- Four Hills Tournament: (East Germany) Jens Weißflog
- Swiss Tournament: (East Germany) Jens Weißflog
- K.O.P. Ski Flying Week: (Norway) Ole Gunnar Fidjestøl
- Nations Cup: Finland

Competitions
- Venues: 16
- Individual: 21
- Cancelled: 2

The 1984–85 FIS Ski Jumping World Cup was the sixth World Cup season in ski jumping.

Season began in Thunder Bay, Canada on 8 December 1984 and was finished in Štrbské Pleso, Czechoslovakia on 24 March 1985. The individual World Cup winner became Finnish ski jumper Matti Nykänen and Nations Cup was taken by Team of Finland.

21 men's individual events on 16 different venues in 12 countries were held on three different continents (Europe, Asia and North America). Two competition were cancelled this season.

Peaks of the season were FIS Nordic World Championships, Ski Flying World Championships, Four Hills Tournament, Bohemia Tournament and the K.O.P. International Ski Flying Week.

On 15 March 1985, at World Championships in Planica, at the official training, world record was improved three times in about an hour. American Mike Holland 186 metres (610 ft) and finnish legend Matti Nykänen two times on 187 metres (614 ft) and 191 metres (627 ft).

== Map of world cup hosts ==
Europe
West Germany	Austria Asia	North America

== Calendar ==
=== Men's Individual ===
N – normal hill / L – large hill / F – flying hill
All	No.	Date	Place (Hill)	Size	Winner	Second	Third	Overall leader (Note: Yellow bib for the overall leader was introduced later, from the 1988/89 season onwards.)	Ref.
121	1	8 December 1984	(Canada) Thunder Bay (Big Thunder K89, K120)	N _{041}	(Austria) Andreas Felder	(Finland) Pentti Kokkonen	(Austria) Ernst Vettori	(Austria) Andreas Felder	
122	2	9 December 1984	(Canada) Thunder Bay (Big Thunder K89, K120)	L _{070}	(Austria) Andreas Felder	(Finland) Jari Puikkonen	(Austria) Ernst Vettori	(Austria) Andreas Felder	
123	3	15 December 1984	(United States) Lake Placid (MacKenzie Int. K114, K86)	L _{071}	(Austria) Andreas Felder	(Czechoslovakia) Jiří Parma	(Austria) Ernst Vettori	(Austria) Andreas Felder	
124	4	16 December 1984	(United States) Lake Placid (MacKenzie Int. K114, K86)	N _{042}	(Austria) Andreas Felder	(Finland) Jari Puikkonen	(Norway) Per Bergerud	(Austria) Andreas Felder	
125	5	30 December 1984	(West Germany) Oberstdorf (Schattenbergschanze K115)	L _{072}	(Austria) Ernst Vettori	(Finland) Matti Nykänen	(Austria) Andreas Felder	(Austria) Andreas Felder	
126	6	1 January 1985	(West Germany) Garmisch-Pa (Große Olympiaschanze K107)	L _{073}	(East Germany) Jens Weißflog	(Finland) Jari Puikkonen	(East Germany) Klaus Ostwald	(Austria) Andreas Felder	
127	7	4 January 1985	(Austria) Innsbruck (Bergiselschanze K109)	L _{074}	(Finland) Matti Nykänen	(East Germany) Jens Weißflog	(Czechoslovakia) Pavel Ploc	(Austria) Andreas Felder	
128	8	6 January 1985	(Austria) Bischofshofen (Paul-Ausserleitner K111)	L _{075}	(Norway) Hroar Stjernen	(East Germany) Klaus Ostwald	(Poland) Piotr Fijas	(Austria) Andreas Felder	
33rd Four Hills Tournament Overall (30 December 1984 – 6 January 1985)					(East Germany) Jens Weißflog	(Finland) Matti Nykänen	(East Germany) Klaus Ostwald	4H Tournament	
129	9	8 January 1985	(Italy) Cortina d’Ampezzo (Trampolino Olimpico K92)	N _{043}	(Norway) Roger Ruud	(Norway) Halvor Persson	(West Germany) Andreas Bauer	(Austria) Andreas Felder	
FIS Nordic World Ski Championships 1985 (20 – 26 January • (Austria) Seefeld)
130	10	9 February 1985	(Japan) Sapporo (Miyanomori K90; Ōkurayama K110)	N _{044}	(Finland) Matti Nykänen	(Czechoslovakia) Ladislav Dluhoš	(Norway) Per Bergerud	(Austria) Andreas Felder	
131	11	10 February 1985	(Japan) Sapporo (Miyanomori K90; Ōkurayama K110)	L _{076}	(Japan) Masahiro Akimoto	(Finland) Matti Nykänen	(Finland) Tuomo Ylipulli	(Austria) Andreas Felder	
132	12	13 February 1985	(Switzerland) St. Moritz (Olympiaschanze K94)	N _{045}	(Austria) Ernst Vettori	(Finland) Matti Nykänen	(East Germany) Jens Weißflog	(Finland) Matti Nykänen	
		15 February 1985	(Switzerland) Gstaad (Mattenschanze K88)	N _{cnx}	cancelled in the middle of first round after several dangerous jumps; (after all Thursday night and Friday morning heavy snowfall and strong wind)			—	
133	13	17 February 1985	(Switzerland) Engelberg (Gross-Titlis-Schanze K120)	L _{077}	(East Germany) Jens Weißflog	(Austria) Ernst Vettori	(Czechoslovakia) Ladislav Dluhoš	(Austria) Ernst Vettori	
21st Swiss Tournament Overall (13 – 17 January 1985)					(East Germany) Jens Weißflog	(Austria) Ernst Vettori	(Norway) Per Bergerud	Swiss Tournament	
134	14	23 February 1985	(Czechoslovakia) Harrachov (Čerťák K180)	F _{012}	(Norway) Ole G. Fidjestøl	(Socialist Federal Republic of Yugoslavia) Miran Tepeš	(Czechoslovakia) Jiří Parma (Norway) Trond J. Pedersen (Poland) Tadeusz Fijas	(Austria) Ernst Vettori	
		24 February 1985	(Czechoslovakia) Harrachov (Čerťák K180)	F _{cnx}	cancelled due to strong wind			—	
32nd K.O.P. International Ski Flying Week Overall (23–24 February 1985)					(Norway) Ole G. Fidjestøl	(Socialist Federal Republic of Yugoslavia) Miran Tepeš	(Czechoslovakia) Jiří Parma (Norway) Trond J. Pedersen (Poland) Tadeusz Fijas	K.O.P.	
135	15	1 March 1985	(Finland) Lahti (Salpausselkä K88, K113)	N _{046}	(Finland) Matti Nykänen	(Czechoslovakia) Pavel Ploc	(United States) Mike Holland	(Finland) Matti Nykänen	
136	16	3 March 1985	(Finland) Lahti (Salpausselkä K88, K113)	L _{078}	(Austria) Andreas Felder	(Finland) Matti Nykänen	(Finland) Jari Puikkonen	(Austria) Andreas Felder	
137	17	5 March 1985	(Sweden) Örnsköldsvik (Paradiskullen K82)	N _{047}	(Czechoslovakia) Jiří Parma	(Socialist Federal Republic of Yugoslavia) Miran Tepeš	(Japan) Masahiro Akimoto	(Austria) Andreas Felder	
138	18	8 March 1985	(Sweden) Falun (Lugnet K112)	L _{079}	(Austria) Andreas Felder	(Czechoslovakia) Pavel Ploc	(Austria) Ernst Vettori	(Austria) Andreas Felder	
139	19	10 March 1985	(Norway) Oslo (Holmenkollbakken K105)	L _{080}	(Finland) Matti Nykänen	(Austria) Franz Wiegele	(Switzerland) Gérard Balanche	(Austria) Andreas Felder	
FIS Ski Flying World Championships 1985 (16–17 March • (Socialist Federal Republic of Yugoslavia) Planica)
140	20	23 March 1985	(Czechoslovakia) Štrbské Pleso (MS 1970 B K88, K114)	N _{048}	(Finland) Matti Nykänen	(Austria) Richard Schallert	(Norway) Vegard Opaas	(Finland) Matti Nykänen	-
141	21	24 March 1985	(Czechoslovakia) Štrbské Pleso (MS 1970 B K88, K114)	L _{081}	(Finland) Matti Nykänen	(Austria) Ernst Vettori	(Austria) Richard Schallert	(Finland) Matti Nykänen	
6th FIS World Cup Overall (8 December 1984 – 24 March 1985)					(Finland) Matti Nykänen	(Austria) Andreas Felder	(Austria) Ernst Vettori	World Cup Overall	

== Standings ==
=== Overall ===
Rank	after 21 events	Points
1	(Finland) Matti Nykänen	224
2	(Austria) Andreas Felder	198
3	(Austria) Ernst Vettori	176
4	(East Germany) Jens Weißflog	151
5	(Czechoslovakia) Jiří Parma	139
6	(Finland) Jari Puikkonen	125
7	(Czechoslovakia) Pavel Ploc	117
8	(Japan) Masahiro Akimoto	89
9	(Norway) Per Bergerud	88
10	(United States) Mike Holland	86

=== Nations Cup ===
Rank	after 21 events	Points
1	Finland	577
2	Austria	562
3	Norway	417
4	Czechoslovakia	400
5	East Germany	271
6	United States	164
7	Yugoslavia	126
8	Japan	100
9	West Germany	87
10	Poland	84

=== Four Hills Tournament ===
Rank	after 4 events	Points
1	(East Germany) Jens Weißflog	855.3
2	(Finland) Matti Nykänen	840.6
3	(East Germany) Klaus Ostwald	830.2
4	(Austria) Ernst Vettori	819.3
5	(Czechoslovakia) Pavel Ploc	805.0
6	(Austria) Andreas Felder	803.9
7	(Poland) Piotr Fijas	793.2
8	(Norway) Rolf Åge Berg	788.9
9	(Norway) Hroar Stjernen	784.1
10	(Czechoslovakia) Jiří Parma	781.5

=== Swiss Tournament ===
Rank	after 2 events	Points
1	(East Germany) Jens Weißflog	448.4
2	(Austria) Ernst Vettori	444.0
3	(Norway) Per Bergerud	412.8
4	(Austria) Andreas Felder	409.2
5	(United States) Mike Holland	407.8
6	(Norway) Hroar Stjernen	407.6
7	(Czechoslovakia) Pavel Ploc	407.1
8	(Czechoslovakia) Jiří Parma	400.9
9	(Socialist Federal Republic of Yugoslavia) Miran Tepeš	397.1
10	(East Germany) Klaus Ostwald	396.0

== See also ==
- 1984–85 FIS Europa Cup (2nd level competition)
