= Bojan Globočnik =

Slovenian ski jumper (1962–2021)

Personal information
- Nationality: Slovenian
- Born: 26 February 1962 Kranj, Yugoslavia
- Died: 18 August 2021 (aged 59) Cerklje na Gorenjskem, Slovenia

Sport
- Sport: Ski jumping

Bojan Globočnik (26 February 1962 – 18 August 2021) was a Slovenian ski jumper. He competed in the normal hill event at the 1984 Winter Olympics.
