= Tadeusz Fijas =

Polish ski jumper (born 1960)

Personal information
- Full name: Tadeusz Fijas
- Born: 1960 (age 65–66)

Sport
- Sport: Skiing

World Cup career
- Seasons: 1985
- Indiv. podiums: 1
- Updated on 30 Mar 2015

Tadeusz Fijas (born 1960) is a Polish former ski jumper.
