= Ulf Findeisen =

East German ski jumper

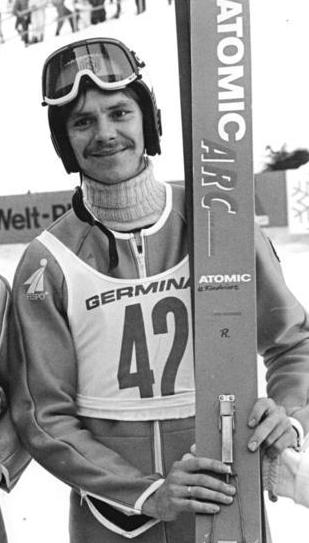
- Findeisen in 1989

Personal information
- Nationality: East Germany
- Born: 2 March 1962 (age 64) Zschopau, East Germany

Sport
- Sport: Skiing

World Cup career
- Seasons: 1983–1990
- Indiv. starts: 59
- Indiv. podiums: 3
- Indiv. wins: 2
Medal record
Men's ski jumping
Representing East Germany
World Championships
| Silver medal – second place | 1984 Engelberg | Team LH |
- Updated on 10 February 2016

Ulf Findeisen (born 2 March 1962) is an East German former ski jumper.

== Career ==
He won a silver medal in the team large hill at the 1984 FIS Nordic World Ski Championships in Engelberg. Findeisen won two World Cup competitions in his career (1986, 1987).

== World Cup ==
=== Standings ===
| Season | Overall | 4H |
|---|---|---|
| 1982/83 | 23 | 38 |
| 1983/84 | 28 | 37 |
| 1984/85 | 57 | 66 |
| 1985/86 | 18 | 36 |
| 1986/87 | 12 | 3rd place, bronze medalist(s) |
| 1987/88 | 59 | 18 |
| 1988/89 | 67 | 41 |
| 1989/90 | — | 66 |

=== Wins ===
| No. | Season | Date | Location | Hill | Size |
|---|---|---|---|---|---|
| 1 | 1985/86 | 19 January 1986 | (East Germany) Oberwiesenthal | Fichtelbergschanzen K90 | NH |
| 2 | 1986/87 | 10 January 1987 | (Czechoslovakia) Štrbské Pleso | MS 1970 A K114 | LH |
