= Paradiskullen =

Ski jumping hill in Örnsköldsvik, Sweden

Coordinates: 63°17′21″N 18°42′05″E

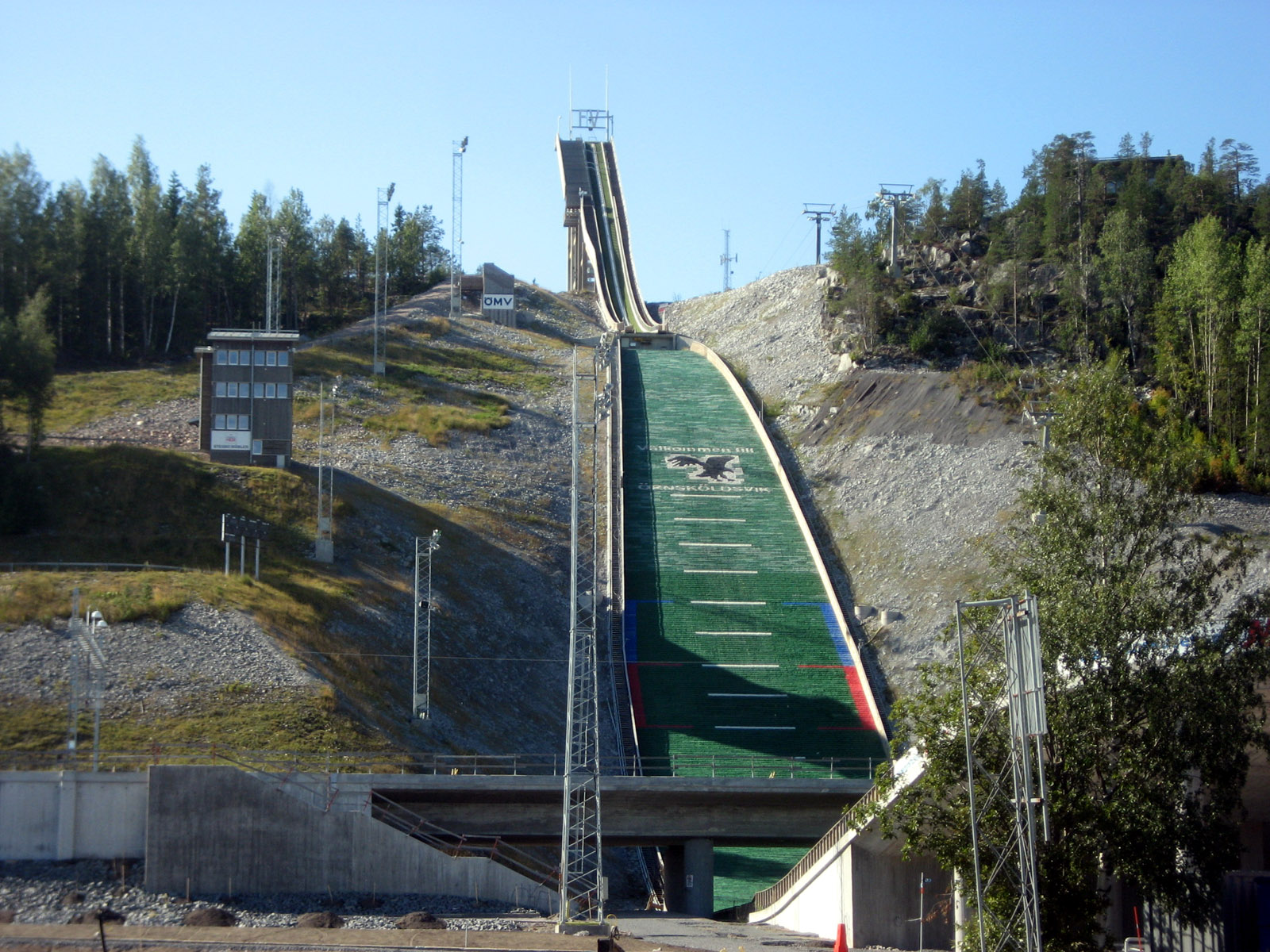
- Location: Örnsköldsvik; Sweden
- Opened: 1961
- Renovated: 1991/92, 2005

Size
- K–point: K-90
- Hill size: HS100
- Hill record: Anssi Koivuranta (FIN) (104.5 m in 2010)

Paradiskullen is a ski jumping hill in Örnsköldsvik, Sweden, and is also a local landmark as it can be seen from downtown Örnsköldsvik. It consists of a normal hill with a K-point of 90 and a hill size of 100, and nearby there are also a few smaller hills, one medium hill and three small hills, as part of the complex. The hill was originally constructed in 1961, and renovated in 1991 and 1992, but had to be moved slightly as the Bothnia Line railway line was being built. The normal hill was reconstructed about 40 m (130 ft) away from its original site, and the smaller hills further away. It is used by the local ski jumping club IF Friska Viljor and various international competitions have been held at the venue through the years, such as the FIS Ski Jumping World Cup, FIS Ski Jumping Continental Cup and FIS Cup.
