= Frédéric Berger =

French ski jumper

Personal information
- Full name: Frédéric Berger
- Born: 27 August 1964 (age 61)

Sport
- Sport: Skiing

World Cup career
- Seasons: 1984–1988
- Indiv. podiums: 1
- Updated on 30 Mar 2015

Frédéric Berger (born 24 August 1964) is a French former ski jumper. He competed at the 1988 Winter Olympics.
