= 1953 Four Hills Tournament =

Ski jumping competition

Four Hills Tournament
- Venues: Große Olympiaschanze, Schattenbergschanze, Bergiselschanze, Paul-Ausserleitner-Schanze
- Location: Germany, Austria
- Dates: 1 January 1953 – 11 January 1953
- Nations: 6

Medalists
gold medal	(Austria) Sepp Bradl
silver medal	(Norway) Halvor Næs
bronze medal	(Norway) Asgeir Dølplads

The inaugural Four Hills tournament was held in January 1953. It was in planning since 1949, but in the post-war years German athletes were not allowed to compete internationally. The organizers were German and Austrian ski jumpers who knew each other from competing together for Germany under the Nazi regime

At the time, ski jumping was an amateur sport and the winners were given material prizes like portable radios or cooking pots.

The first competition was held on New Year's Day, making it the only Four Hills tournament that did not start in December, although the New Year's Day competition in Garmisch-Partenkirchen would eventually become traditional.

== Participating nations and athletes ==
Nation	Number of Athletes	Athletes
Germany	14	Hermann Anwander, Friedl Brandner, Toni Brutscher, Franz Dengg, Franz Eder, Toni Eisgruber, Robert Engel, Willi Fischer, Willy Gotthold, Sepp Hohenleitner, Hans Karg, Heini Klopfer, Toni Landenhammer, Sepp Weiler
Austria	8	Sepp Bradl, Rudi Dietrich, Ferdi Kerber, Alwin Plank, Fritz Rüpp, Erwin Steinegger, Walter Steinegger, Toni Wieser
Norway	3	Asgeir Dølplads, Erling Kroken, Halvor Næs
Sweden	4	Harry Bergquist, Karl Holmström, Toivo Lauren, Axel-Hermann Nilsson
Switzerland	1	Fritz Schneider
Yugoslavia	3	Karel Klančnik, Janez Polda, Jože Zidar

== Results ==
=== Garmisch-Partenkirchen ===
(Germany) Große Olympiaschanze, Garmisch-Partenkirchen
1 January 1953

Rank	Name	Points
1	(Norway) Asgeir Dølplads	221.5
2	(Austria) Sepp Bradl	220.5
3	(Germany) Toni Brutscher	219.5
4	(Norway) Halvor Næs	218.5
5	(Sweden) Toivo Lauren	215.0
6	(Germany) Sepp Weiler	212.5
7	(Germany) Sepp Hohenleitner	209.5
8	(Norway) Erling Kroken	209.0
9	(Austria) Walter Steinegger	204.5
10	(Germany) Franz Dengg	198.0

=== Oberstorf ===
(Germany) Schattenbergschanze, Oberstorf
4 January 1953

Rank	Name	Points
1	(Norway) Erling Kroken	217.0
2	(Austria) Sepp Bradl	215.5
3	(Norway) Asgeir Dølplads	215.0
4	(Norway) Halvor Næs	214.5
5	(Sweden) Karl Holmström	213.0
5	(Germany) Sepp Weiler	213.0
7	(Germany) Toni Brutscher	212.0
8	(Sweden) Toivo Lauren	211.5
9	(Germany) Franz Eder	210.0
9	(Germany) Sepp Hohenleitner	210.0
9	(Austria) Walter Steinegger	210.0

=== Innsbruck ===
(Austria) Bergiselschanze, Innsbruck
6 January 1953

Rank	Name	Points
1	(Austria) Sepp Bradl	224.0
2	(Norway) Asgeir Dølplads	223.0
3	(Sweden) Harry Bergquist	219.0
4	(Norway) Halvor Næs	216.5
5	(Germany) Sepp Hohenleitner	215.0
6	(Sweden) Karl Holmström	213.5
7	(Germany) Toni Brutscher	212.0
8	(Socialist Federal Republic of Yugoslavia) Janez Polda	211.5
9	(Sweden) Toivo Lauren	209.5
10	(Switzerland) Fritz Schneider	209.0
10	(Germany) Sepp Weiler	209.0

=== Bischofshofen ===
(Austria) Paul-Ausserleitner-Schanze, Bischofshofen
11 January 1953

Before the last event, Sepp Bradl was leading the tournament ranking by only half a point ahead of Asgeir Dølplads, who in turn had a ten-point lead to fellow Norwegian Halvor Næs. In the competition however, it was Næs rather than Dølplads who put Bradl's tournament victory in danger. Winning the Bischofshofen event clearly, he reduced the distance to Bradl from 10.5 to 1.1 points but ultimately could not prevent him from becoming the first Four Hills winner.

Rank	Name	Points
1	(Norway) Halvor Næs	228.0
2	(Austria) Sepp Bradl	218.6
3	(Sweden) Harry Bergquist	216.4
4	(Germany) Franz Eder	210.7
5	(Germany) Sepp Weiler	209.4
6	(Sweden) Karl Holmström	208.6
7	(Norway) Asgeir Dølplads	208.3
8	(Sweden) Toivo Lauren	207.9
9	(Norway) Erling Kroken	205.3
10	(Socialist Federal Republic of Yugoslavia) Janez Polda	204.3

== Final ranking ==
Rank	Name	Garmisch-Partenkirchen	Oberstorf	Innsbruck	Bischofshofen	Points
1	(Austria) Sepp Bradl	2nd	2nd	1st	2nd	878.6
2	(Norway) Halvor Næs	4th	4th	4th	1st	877.5
3	(Norway) Asgeir Dølplads	1st	3rd	2nd	7th	867.5
4	(Germany) Toni Brutscher	3rd	7th	7th	12th	847.0
5	(Sweden) Toivo Lauren	5th	8th	9th	8th	843.9
5	(Germany) Sepp Weiler	6th	5th	11th	5th	843.9
7	(Germany) Sepp Hohenleitner	7th	9th	5th	14th	827.7
8	(Austria) Walter Steinegger	9th	9th	13th	11th	822.9
9	(Sweden) Karl Holmström	17th	5th	6th	6th	813.6
10	(Norway) Erling Kroken	8th	1st	N/A	9th	631.3
