= Ski jumping at the 1952 Winter Olympics =

Ski jumping at the VI Olympic Winter Games
- Venue: Holmenkollbakken
- Dates: February 24, 1952
- Competitors: 44 from 13 nations
- Winning Score: 226.0

Medalists
1st place, gold medalist(s)		Arnfinn Bergmann	Norway
2nd place, silver medalist(s)		Torbjørn Falkanger	Norway
3rd place, bronze medalist(s)		Karl Holmström	Sweden

At the 1952 Winter Olympics in Oslo, one ski jumping event was contested. The competition took place at the Holmenkollen ski jump with a K-Point of 72 m (236 ft).

== Medalists ==
Gold	Arnfinn Bergmann; Norway
Silver	Torbjørn Falkanger; Norway
Bronze	Karl Holmström; Sweden

== Results ==
Rank	Athlete	Jump	Distance	Style					Score
Rank	Athlete	Jump	Distance	A	B	C	D	E	Score
1	Arnfinn Bergmann (NOR)	1	67.5m	18.0	18.0	17.5	18.5	19.0	226.0
1	Arnfinn Bergmann (NOR)	2	68.0m	18.5	18.5	18.5	19.0	19.5	226.0
2	Torbjørn Falkanger (NOR)	1	68.0m	18.0	18.5	17.0	18.5	18.5	221.5
2	Torbjørn Falkanger (NOR)	2	64.0m	18.0	18.0	18.0	18.5	19.0	221.5
3	Karl Holmström (SWE)	1	67.0m	18.0	17.5	16.5	18.5	17.5	219.5
3	Karl Holmström (SWE)	2	65.5m	18.0	18.0	17.5	18.0	18.0	219.5
4	Toni Brutscher (GER)	1	66.5m	18.0	16.5	18.0	18.5	18.5	216.5
4	Toni Brutscher (GER)	2	62.5m	18.0	17.5	17.5	18.5	17.0	216.5
4	Halvor Næs (NOR)	1	63.5m	18.0	18.5	18.0	18.5	18.0	216.5
4	Halvor Næs (NOR)	2	64.5m	18.0	18.0	18.0	18.5	18.0	216.5
6	Arne Hoel (NOR)	1	66.5m	17.0	17.5	16.0	18.5	18.0	215.5
6	Arne Hoel (NOR)	2	63.5m	17.0	17.5	17.0	19.0	18.5	215.5
7	Antti Hyvärinen (FIN)	1	66.5m	18.0	18.0	18.0	18.5	18.5	213.5
7	Antti Hyvärinen (FIN)	2	61.5m	17.0	15.5	17.5	17.5	16.5	213.5
8	Sepp Weiler (GER)	1	67.0m	17.0	17.0	17.5	17.0	16.0	213.0
8	Sepp Weiler (GER)	2	63.0m	17.0	17.5	17.5	18.0	17.0	213.0
8	Pentti Uotinen (FIN)	1	63.0m	18.0	18.0	16.0	18.0	17.5	213.0
8	Pentti Uotinen (FIN)	2	64.5m	17.5	17.0	16.5	17.5	17.5	213.0
10	Sepp Kleisl (GER)	1	66.5m	17.5	17.0	14.5	17.0	17.5	208.0
10	Sepp Kleisl (GER)	2	62.5m	15.5	16.0	15.0	16.5	16.0	208.0
11	Hans Nordin (SWE)	1	63.5m	17.0	16.5	17.0	17.0	18.0	206.5
11	Hans Nordin (SWE)	2	61.5m	17.5	16.5	15.5	17.0	17.0	206.5
12	Olavi Kuronen (FIN)	1	62.5m	17.0	17.0	16.5	17.0	16.5	204.5
12	Olavi Kuronen (FIN)	2	61.5m	17.5	16.5	16.0	17.5	16.0	204.5
12	Keith R. Wegeman (USA)	1	62.5m	17.0	16.5	15.5	18.5	16.0	204.5
12	Keith R. Wegeman (USA)	2	63.0m	17.0	17.0	14.5	17.0	17.0	204.5
14	Walter Steinegger (AUT)	1	61.5m	16.5	16.0	16.5	17.5	15.5	202.0
14	Walter Steinegger (AUT)	2	63.0m	16.5	16.5	16.0	15.5	16.0	202.0
15	Art Devlin (USA)	1	63.5m	17.5	16.5	17.0	17.0	16.0	201.5
15	Art Devlin (USA)	2	60.5m	16.0	16.5	14.5	16.5	14.0	201.5
16	Janez Polda (YUG)	1	62.5m	16.5	16.5	14.0	16.5	15.5	200.5
16	Janez Polda (YUG)	2	62.0m	15.5	16.0	16.5	16.0	15.0	200.5
16	Andreas Däscher (SUI)	1	62.0m	16.5	17.0	15.5	18.0	17.0	200.5
16	Andreas Däscher (SUI)	2	61.0m	15.0	15.5	15.5	16.5	16.0	200.5
18	Arthur E. Tokle (USA)	1	62.5m	16.0	16.0	15.0	17.5	16.0	199.5
18	Arthur E. Tokle (USA)	2	63.0m	16.0	16.0	15.0	15.0	14.0	199.5
18	Tauno Luiro (FIN)	1	60.5m	15.0	13.5	16.0	15.5	14.0	199.5
18	Tauno Luiro (FIN)	2	64.0m	17.0	16.5	16.5	17.5	17.0	199.5
20	Hans Däscher (SUI)	1	61.0m	16.0	16.0	15.5	16.5	15.0	198.5
20	Hans Däscher (SUI)	2	60.0m	16.5	17.0	16.5	17.5	15.0	198.5
21	Rudolf Dietrich (AUT)	1	63.0m	15.0	12.5	15.0	16.0	14.5	198.0
21	Rudolf Dietrich (AUT)	2	62.5m	16.0	16.0	16.0	16.5	15.0	198.0
22	Willis S. Olson (USA)	1	62.5m	16.0	16.0	16.0	17.5	16.0	193.5
22	Willis S. Olson (USA)	2	62.0m	14.0	13.0	14.0	15.0	12.0	193.5
23	Jacques Perreten (SUI)	1	61.0m	16.0	16.0	16.0	17.5	15.0	193.0
23	Jacques Perreten (SUI)	2	59.0m	15.0	16.0	15.0	15.0	14.0	193.0
24	Antoni Wieczorek (POL)	1	60.5m	15.5	15.0	15.5	15.0	15.5	191.0
24	Antoni Wieczorek (POL)	2	60.5m	14.5	15.0	14.5	15.5	14.0	191.0
25	Jacques Charland (CAN)	1	62.5m	15.5	13.5	13.0	15.0	14.5	190.0
25	Jacques Charland (CAN)	2	61.0m	15.5	14.5	14.0	15.0	13.0	190.0
26	Fritz Schneider (SUI)	1	59.5m	16.0	15.5	15.0	17.0	14.0	189.5
26	Fritz Schneider (SUI)	2	59.5m	15.0	13.0	15.0	15.5	14.0	189.5
27	Stanisław Marusarz (POL)	1	59.0m	15.5	13.5	14.0	17.5	14.5	189.0
27	Stanisław Marusarz (POL)	2	60.5m	16.0	14.5	14.0	15.5	15.5	189.0
27	Tatsuo Watanabe (JPN)	1	59.0m	15.5	15.5	15.0	16.0	15.0	189.0
27	Tatsuo Watanabe (JPN)	2	59.0m	15.0	16.0	14.0	17.0	14.0	189.0
29	Karel Klančnik (YUG)	1	60.0m	16.5	15.5	15.0	16.0	15.0	188.5
29	Karel Klančnik (YUG)	2	56.5m	15.5	14.0	15.0	15.5	15.0	188.5
29	Hans Eder (AUT)	1	57.5m	16.0	16.0	16.5	16.0	15.0	188.5
29	Hans Eder (AUT)	2	55.5m	16.0	15.5	16.0	16.0	15.0	188.5
31	Franz Dengg (GER)	1	60.0m	16.0	15.0	14.5	17.5	15.5	187.5
31	Franz Dengg (GER)	2	56.5m	15.0	14.0	14.5	15.5	15.0	187.5
32	Bror Östman (SWE)	1	66.5m	18.5	17.5	17.5	18.0	18.0	187.0
32	Bror Östman (SWE)	2	65.0m	7.0	7.0	8.0	8.0	6.0	187.0
33	Jakub Węgrzynkiewicz (POL)	1	60.5m	15.0	14.5	14.0	16.0	14.0	185.0
33	Jakub Węgrzynkiewicz (POL)	2	58.5m	14.0	15.0	13.5	16.0	13.0	185.0
34	Ryoichi Fujisawa (JPN)	1	57.5m	16.0	15.5	14.0	17.0	14.5	183.5
34	Ryoichi Fujisawa (JPN)	2	55.5m	14.5	16.0	14.0	16.0	14.0	183.5
35	Ari Guðmundsson (ISL)	1	60.0m	14.5	11.5	12.5	15.0	12.0	183.0
35	Ari Guðmundsson (ISL)	2	59.0m	15.5	14.5	15.0	16.5	14.0	183.0
36	Hiroshi Yoshizawa (JPN)	1	59.5m	15.5	15.5	14.5	17.0	14.5	182.5
36	Hiroshi Yoshizawa (JPN)	2	56.5m	14.5	13.0	13.5	15.0	13.0	182.5
36	André Monnier (FRA)	1	56.0m	16.0	14.0	13.5	16.0	14.0	182.5
36	André Monnier (FRA)	2	56.0m	16.0	16.0	13.5	15.5	15.0	182.5
38	Régis Rey (FRA)	1	56.5m	15.5	14.5	13.5	15.5	14.0	181.5
38	Régis Rey (FRA)	2	57.5m	15.0	13.5	14.0	15.0	14.5	181.5
39	Leopold Tajner (POL)	1	57.0m	14.0	14.0	13.0	16.5	13.0	178.0
39	Leopold Tajner (POL)	2	56.5m	14.5	14.0	13.5	16.5	15.0	178.0
40	Thure Lindgren (SWE)	1	63.0m	6.5	6.5	6.0	7.0	4.0	175.5
40	Thure Lindgren (SWE)	2	62.5m	18.0	17.0	16.0	18.0	16.0	175.5
41	Lucien Laferte (CAN)	1	61.0m	4.5	4.5	4.5	6.0	3.0	162.5
41	Lucien Laferte (CAN)	2	59.5m	16.0	16.5	16.0	17.0	14.0	162.5
42	Kozo Kawashima (JPN)	1	59.5m	4.5	2.0	3.0	6.0	2.0	148.0
42	Kozo Kawashima (JPN)	2	56.0m	14.0	14.5	14.5	16.0	13.0	148.0
43	Henri Thioliere (FRA)	1	56.5m	3.5	1.0	2.0	4.0	2.0	142.5
43	Henri Thioliere (FRA)	2	55.0m	14.5	13.5	14.5	16.0	14.5	142.5

== Participating NOCs ==
Thirteen nations participated in ski jumping at the Oslo Games.

- Austria (4)
- Canada (2)
- Finland (4)
- France (3)
- Germany (4)
- Iceland (1)
- Japan (2)
- Norway (4)
- Poland (4)
- Sweden (4)
- Switzerland (4)
- United States (4)
- Yugoslavia (4)
