= Holmenkollbakken =

Ski jumping hill in Oslo, Norway

- Kollen
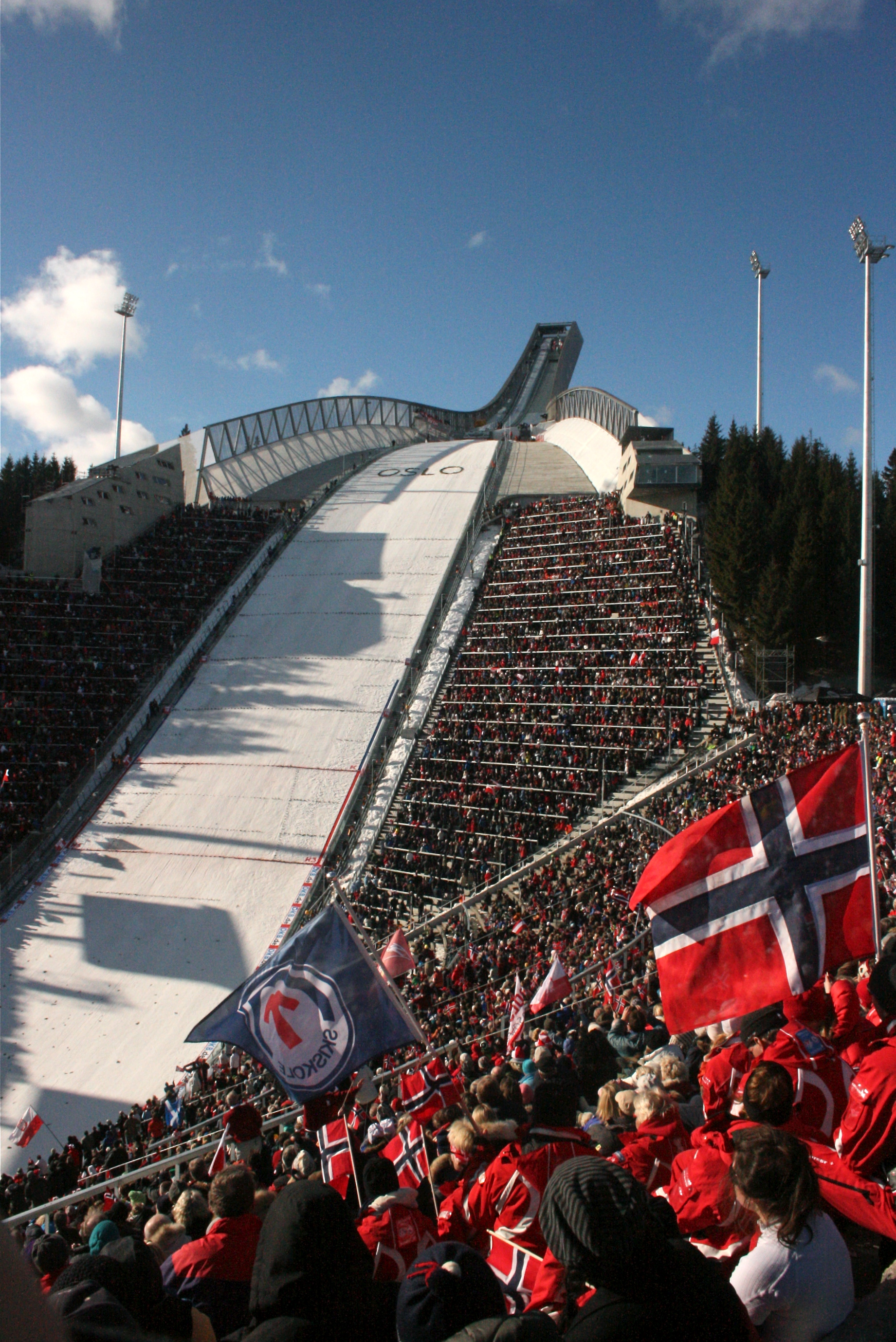
- Location: Holmenkollen, Oslo; Norway
- Coordinates: 59°57′50″N 10°40′04″E
- Opened: 30 January 1892
- Renovated: 1894, 1904, 1907, 1910, 1914, 1928, 1931, 1940, 1945, 1952, 1966, 1977, 1982, 1992, 2010

Size
- K–point: K-120
- Hill size: HS 134
- Hill record: 146 m (Finland) Ilkka Herola
- Spectator capacity: 30.000

Top events
- Olympics: 1952
- World Championships: 1930, 1966, 1982, 2011

Holmenkollbakken is a large ski jumping hill located at Holmenkollen in Oslo, Norway. It has a hill size of HS134, a construction point of K-120, and a capacity for 70,000 spectators. Holmenkollen has hosted the Holmenkollen Ski Festival since 1892, which since 1980 have been part of the FIS Ski Jumping World Cup and 1983 the FIS Nordic Combined World Cup. It has also hosted the 1952 Winter Olympics and the FIS Nordic World Ski Championships in 1930, 1966, 1982 and 2011.

The hill has been rebuilt 19 times; important upgrades include a stone take-off in 1910, an in-run superstructure in 1914, and a new superstructure in 1928. During the Second World War, the venue was used as a military installation, but upgraded in the late 1940s. Further expansions were made ahead of the 1966 and 1982 World Championships, as well as in 1991. Between 2008 and 2010, the entire structure was demolished and rebuilt. The hill record is held by Robert Johansson at 144.0 meters. The hill is part of Holmenkollen National Arena, which in addition to cross-country and biathlon venues has the normal hill Midtstubakken.

== History ==
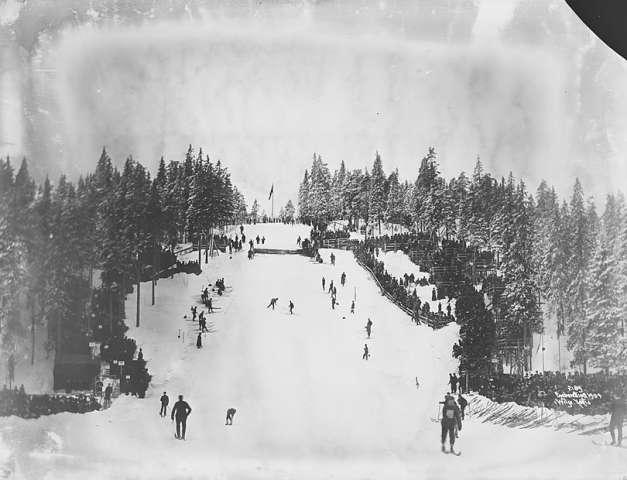
Holmenkollbakken in 1904, after the stone take-off had been built

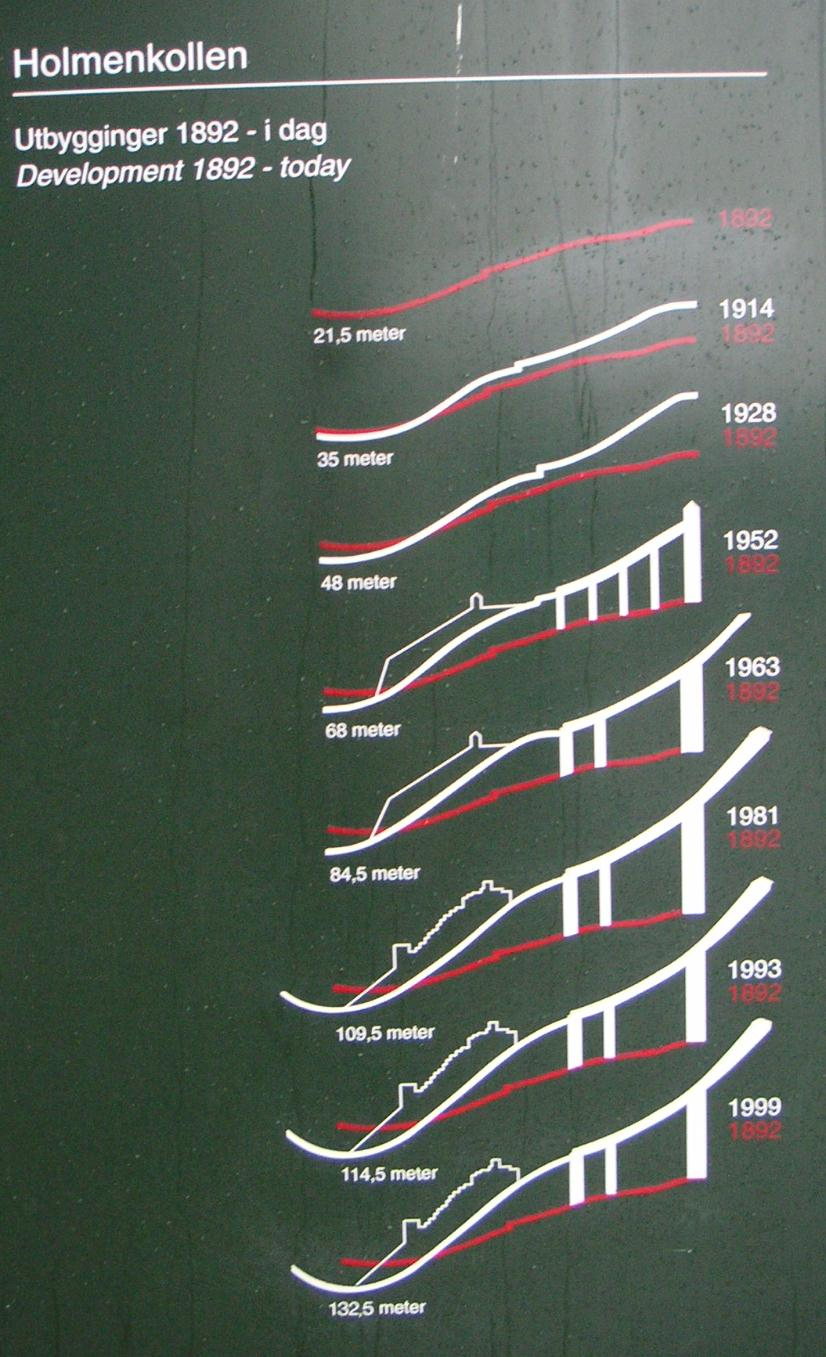
Growth of the Holmenkollbakken

=== Original hill ===
The first major skiing competition in Oslo was Husebyrennet, which was held in Husebybakken in Ullern from 1879 until 1891. In 1887, the road to Holmenkollen was opened, although it was at the time only used for recreation, as there was no housing in the area. I. C. L. Holm saw the potential to develop the area into a recreational centre, and established Peisestuen in 1886, Holmenkollen Sportsstue in 1891, Holmenkollen Sanatorium og Turisthotell in 1894, and Voksenkollen Sanatorium in 1900. In 1890, Husebyrennet had to be canceled due to lack of snow, and instead the tournament was held at Ullbakken at Frognerseteren. Because of the distance, the tournament was held on a Sunday; this caused some criticism, and to compensate it was decided not to collect entrance fees. The following year, the final event was held in Husebybakken.

Following the 1891 season, the lease with the land owner for Husebybakken needed to be renegotiated. Several times the venues had had too little snow and Fritz Huitfeldt and Hans Krag proposed building a new hill at Besserudmyra. After half a year of planning, the general assembly of the Association for the Promotion of Skiing approved the move in late 1891. To create sufficient water supply for the hotels, a dam had been built and this created Besserudtjernet, a small lake, at the bottom of the hill. It would cover with ice during the winter. Construction was simple: a few trees had to be chopped down and when the snow came, branches were laid where the jump was to be. The first competition was held on 30 January 1892, and was spectated by between fifteen and twenty thousand people, who saw jumpers reach 15 to 21.5 meters.

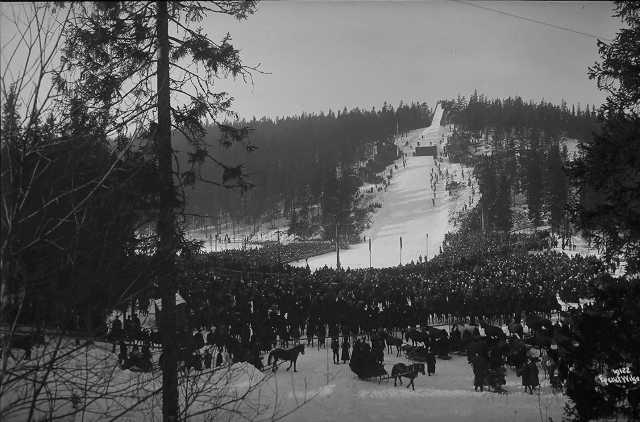
Holmenkollbakken in 1917, after the first scaffold had been erected

The original hill had a knoll just after the take-off, which gave the psychological feeling of falling and made landing more difficult. It was therefore decided to change the profile slightly to make the hill safer and allow more jumpers to land properly. No standard profiles existed at the time, so the Association for the Promotion of Skiing had to do guesswork to create a better profile. The new profile was taken into use from 1894 and had cost NOK 2000. For the first decade, the take-off was rebuilt for every year, and its position would therefore vary. In 1904, the take-off was rebuilt with rocks, giving it a specific location on the hill. Prior to the 1907 season, landing slope was built down slightly into the terrain down from the 25 meter mark, as it would give easier landing. The take-off was moved in 1910 and built as a 2-meter (6 ft 7 in) tall stone structure. To keep the lake with a hard layer of ice, the snow was removed as it fell; if the ice was not thick enough it could create problems with flooding the spectator areas during the events. From 1913, the lake was opened as a skating rink and marketed by the hotels as part of their services. However, it was never a success, and was abandoned within a few years.

During the 1910s it had become common in the United States to build jumps with a scaffold superstructure for the in-run, and this had been described as an abomination in the Norwegian press. Prior to the 1914 season, a 10-meter (33 ft) tall steel superstructure was built. This resulted in massive negative reactions in the press, and it was the public's opinion that ski jumping was to be done in natural hills. The same year, two other major Norwegian hills received similar structures, Nydalsbakken and Solbergbakken. The first trials were made on 15 January, giving jumps 34 meters. This was regarded as the furthest anyone would jump. The hill was subsequently expanded slightly a few times afterwards, including blasting it steeper, chopping it wider, and covering the landing slope with earth and sowing grass to improve the profile.

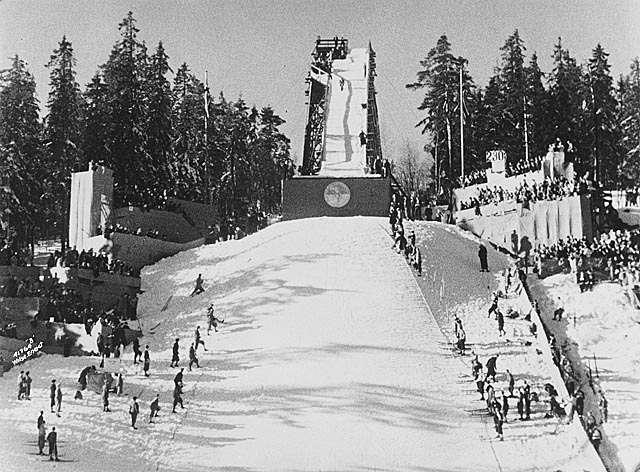
In-run in 1934, after the second scaffold had been erected

=== Olympic hill ===
The day after the race in 1927, the superstructure collapsed, caused by rot in combination with a heavy snowfall. This caused the introduction of public control with scaffolding and bleachers in Norway. By then, Holmenkollbakken was lagging behind internationally, and the world record at the time had exceeded 60 meters. It was therefore decided that a new superstructure would be 19 meters (62 ft) tall and moved 9 meters (30 ft) further back. Besserudtjernet was partially drained in 1928, but the hotels, which received their water from the lake, would not allow draining the following years. In 1931, the lake was fully drained, which allowed the out-run to be longer. In the 1930s, talk of an 80-meter hill started, which would potentially be built in Rødkleiva, further out in Nordmarka. The Association for the Promotion of Skiing made a formal investigation into the matter in 1937. There was agreement that the venue was becoming too small for international competitions.

Following the FIS Nordic World Ski Championships 1940 being awarded to Oslo, the Association for the Promotion of Skiing decided to build a larger in-run. Construction started in 1938 and consisted of a 40-meter (130 ft) tall in-run tower. The take-off was moved 12 meters (39 ft) further back and 6 meters (20 ft) higher. The new structure was inaugurated in 1940, although the World Championships were canceled due to the Second World War. The venue was subsequently left unused for five years during the German occupation of Norway. German forces used the hill as a site for anti-aircraft artillery and the in-run was painted green. In 1945, the venue received a new upgrade, this time with new grandstands and a larger profile.

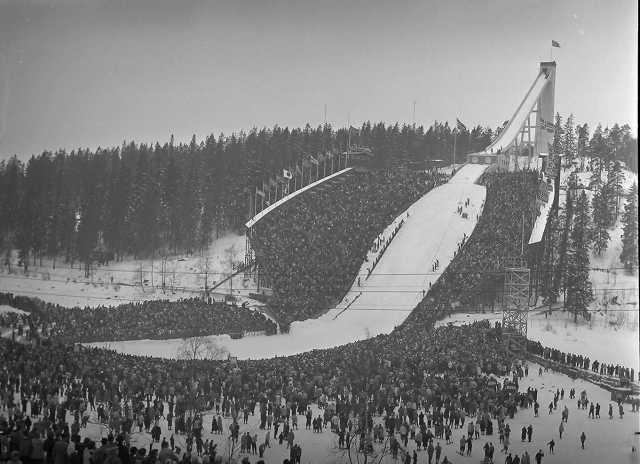
The hill in 1952, one week after the 1952 Winter Olympics had been held there

In 1948, Oslo was awarded to host the 1952 Winter Olympics. This caused a bonanza of plans, one superseding the other. Until then, the grandstand on the sides of the hill had been temporary; prior to the Olympics these were rebuilt as permanent. A new grandstand was built, a jury tower was constructed, as was facilities for the delegates, the royal family and radio broadcasting. The in-run was rebuilt; while it previously had been a mess of open, wooden structures, it was shelled in, painted white and received an elevator. The hill had to be expanded, and to allow this, the landing slope needed to be lifted by being built as an artificial structure. Below the lifted part of the hill was built a three-story building, with the ski museum in the lower two floors and a restaurant in the top floor. The lake was dug 6 meters (20 ft) deep and made a swimming pool during the summer. The upgrades cost NOK 1.5 million, paid for by Oslo Municipality. These upgrades resulted in an artificial lake being constructed in the off-run, which became a recreational and swimming venue for the city's residents. The lake was at the time 3 meters (9.8 ft) deep and had a typical temperature of 10 °C (50 °F). Oslo had a failed bid for the 1968 Winter Olympics.

Following Oslo's decision to bid for the FIS Nordic World Ski Championships 1966, it became evident that more upgrades would be needed to meet the International Ski Federation's requirements. To allow for longer jumps, the take-off needed to be moved 10 meters (33 ft) back, and the lake dug deeper, with new concrete stands being built into the sides. Combined with the tower being built taller, this gave a 56-meter (184 ft) height difference between the start and the off-run, allowing for the desired lengths. The championships were the first to use computer to calculate the scores, but communication still used wired telephones, as had been used during the Olympics. The public announcement and scoreboard systems remained manual.

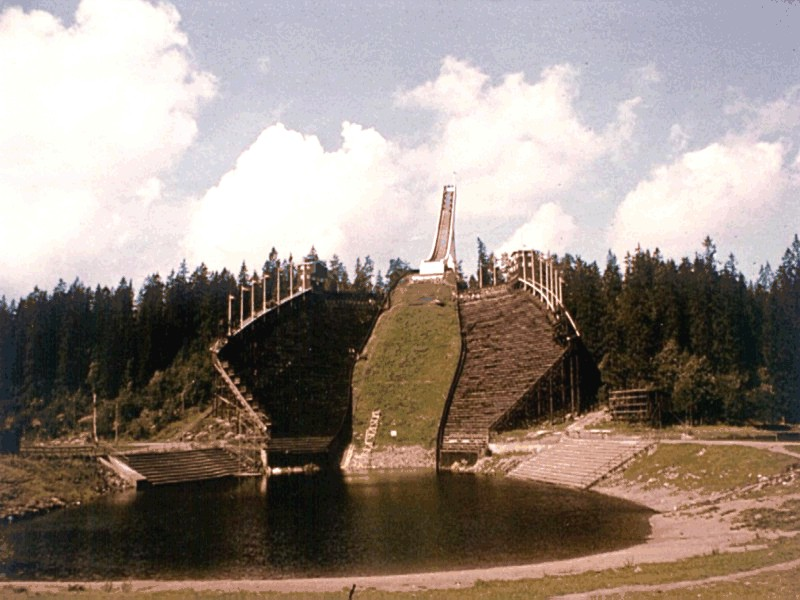
The hill during the summer of 1975

By 1971, the Association for the Promotion of Skiing was no longer making much money off the Ski Festival, and they started discussing rebuilding the entire complex. Rolf Ramm Østgaard made a proposal which would include a twin hill, with both a normal and large hill. Again the proposal of building the large hill at Rødkleiva was launched. The arguments for keeping the hill at Holmenkollen was that it would allow for a close connection between the ski jumping and cross-country skiing events. However, Holmenkollen, because it was built with a superstructure, was plagued with wind. Experience from among other things Salpausselkä in Lahti, Finland, showed that this could be partially combated by building the jump into the hill. No immediate solution was found, and maintenance of the old structure continued. Lighting which allowed the venue to be seen from the city during night was installed in 1977. The main problem was the elevator, which was eventually replaced in 1978. During the 1970s, a stage was built in the lake, which allowed concerts, plays and other entertainment events to take place. Oslo City Council considered bidding for the 1980 Winter Olympics during the 1970s, but it was found that it would not be a suitable investment.

In 1979, Oslo was awarded the FIS Nordic World Ski Championships 1982, and further upgrades to the hill were necessary. The costs of the upgrades were NOK 50 million, of which the Norwegian Ski Federation paid NOK 5 million, and Oslo Municipality and the state split the rest. The large expenditures resulted in a public debate. The upgrades saw the introduction of electronics into most parts of the venue. The old system of manual distance measurement by people standing beside the hill was abolished, and replaced by the video-based system Robotron. Other new installations was an electronic result and scoreboard system, a new time-keeping and speed system, and a new central system to calculate scores. The in-run was expanded, and a mobile start platform was installed, but later removed and replaced by a bar. The knoll and landing slope were adjusted, and the straight section was moved 10 meters (33 ft) further down. In the transition to the out-run, 130,000 cubic meters (4,600,000 cu ft) of earthwork was blasted away, and Besserudtjernet was sunk another 7 meters (23 ft). This allowed for additional grandstands to be built and the last wooden grandstands were removed. New structures were built for delegates, broadcasting and the jury.

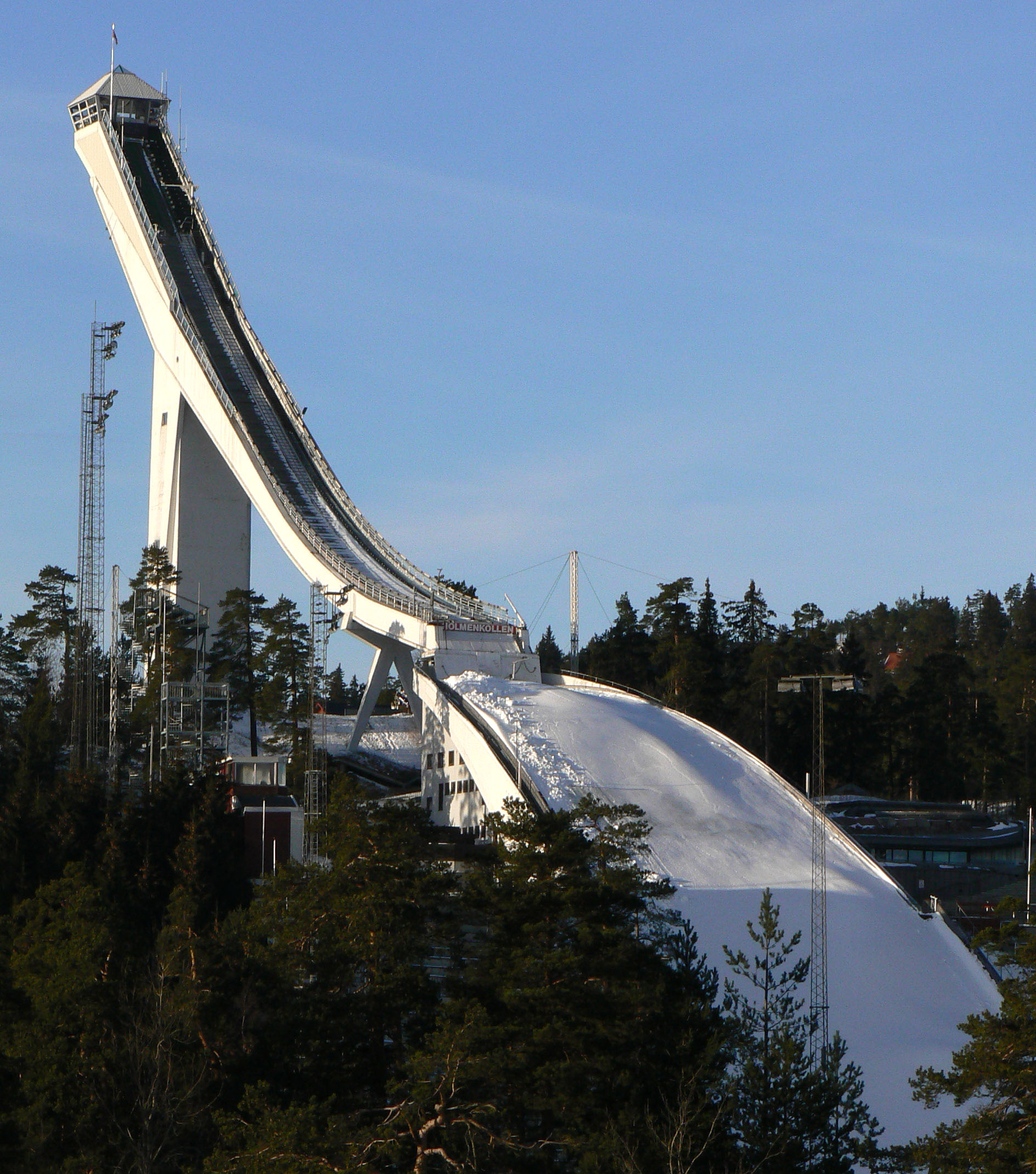
The in-run in 2007

The Robotron system was found to be unreliable, and was taken out of use in 1986. In 1990, a porcelain track was laid in the in-run. An aluminum stage was also built across the off-run, which could be used for concerts during the summer. In 1992, the hill was further expanded by digging down another 3.5 meters (11 ft). This increased the K-point from 105 to 110. From 1992, the venue used a system of video still images to determine the length. Following the decision to upgrade the hill in 1991, Kollenhopp was established. A cooperation between the ski jumping clubs in Eastern Norway, it was to create more jumping activity in Holmenkollbakken, similar to the success of Trønderhopp. From 1992, the hill received floodlighting, allowing events to be scheduled into the evening, and the organizers able to move events to the evening, if wind conditions were not good during the day.

=== New hill ===
In 2002, the Association for the Promotion of Skiing and the city started the process of applying for the FIS Nordic World Ski Championships 2009. The city council decided to grant NOK 52.8 million to upgrade Holmenkollen, including Holmenkollbakken, for the 2009 World Championships. Oslo lost the vote in the International Ski Federation (FIS) against Liberec, Czech Republic, on 4 June 2004. The Norwegian Ski Federation subsequently stated that they would apply for the 2011 World Championships. The Association for the Promotion of Skiing stated that they wanted a new hill in Rødkleiva instead of expanding the existing ski flying hill in Vikersund, Vikersundbakken. Holmenkollbakken would then be used for the last time as a large hill during the 2011 World Championships, and would then converted to a normal hill. In May 2005, the general assembly of the Norwegian Ski Federation voted to build a new ski flying and normal hill in Rødkleiva ahead of the 2011 World Championships. Following Vikersundbakken being awarded the FIS Ski-Flying World Championships 2012 in 2008, the general assembly of the Norwegian Ski Federation that year decided to terminate the plans for a ski flying hill in Rødkleiva.

On 22 September 2005, FIS stated that an all-new Holmenkollbakken would have to be built if Oslo was to host the World Championships and World Cup tournaments. FIS stated that similar reconstructions had been done with Schattenbergschanze in Oberstdorf, Germany, and Bergiselschanze in Innsbruck, Austria. In December 2005, the Norwegian Directorate for Cultural Heritage gave permission for the tower to be demolished, on the condition it was replaced by a new in-run with a similar architectural quality and retain its function as a landmark. They stated that it was the activity itself that is worthy of preservation, not the structure itself. The city council made the final decision to apply for the World Championships and build a new hill on 1 March 2006. A new hill was at the time estimated to cost NOK 310 million, and the state was willing to finance NOK 70 million of those. Oslo was awarded the 2011 World Championships in May 2006.

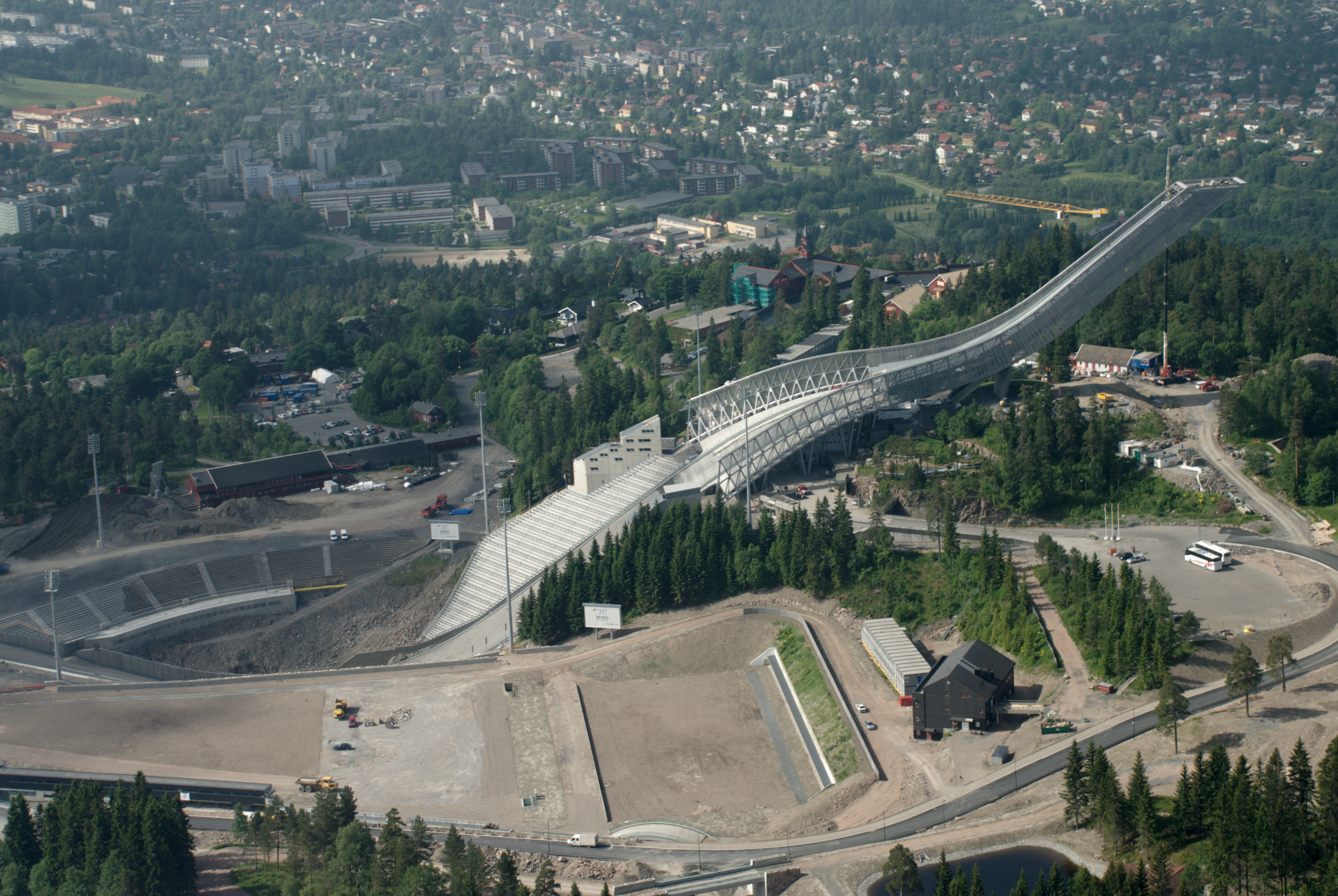
The new hill during construction; ski stadium is in foreground

The municipality issued an architectural design competition to rebuild the hill; Julien De Smedt and Florian Kosche's proposal was selected among 104 entrants. At the time, it was estimated that the new national arena would cost NOK 653 million. Demolition of Holmenkollbakken started on 16 October 2008. The World Cup tournament in 2009 was held at Vikersundbakken instead of Holmenkollen because of the reconstruction. By 2008, the cost had accelerated to NOK 1.2 billion, and by the following year it had reached NOK 1.8 billion. City Commissioner For Business and Culture, Anette Wiig Bryn of the Progress Party, had to leave her position because of the cost overruns. A consultant report ordered by the municipality concluded that the pressure to find cost savings to stay within the budget, which was underestimated to start with, resulted in slower progress, which again resulted in higher costs.

The costs of the new large hill were NOK 715 million, while total costs for the upgrade of the national arena and infrastructure ended at NOK 2,426 million. This included the construction of a new ski stadium next to Holmenkollbakken, and Midtstubakken, and upgrades to the Holmenkollen Line. It was originally decided that the first jump would be taken by Anette Sagen, Norway's leading female jumper, on 3 March 2010. However, the organizers decided that Bjørn Einar Romøren would be allowed to test-jump the venue the evening before. In the first ever jump in the new venue, Romøren jumped 110.0 meters. The organizers stated that Sagen's jump the following day, which reached 106.5 meters, was to be considered the official first jump. Romøren was subsequently suspended from the following World Cup round.

On 1 January, 2018, Holmenkollen hosted alpine skiing for the first time when World Cup parallel slalom events for men and women were held under the lights on a temporary 180-metre (590 ft) 19-gate course constructed inside the ski jumping arena, replacing a similar event previously held in Munich. The races returned the next season, also on New Year's Day.

== Facilities ==
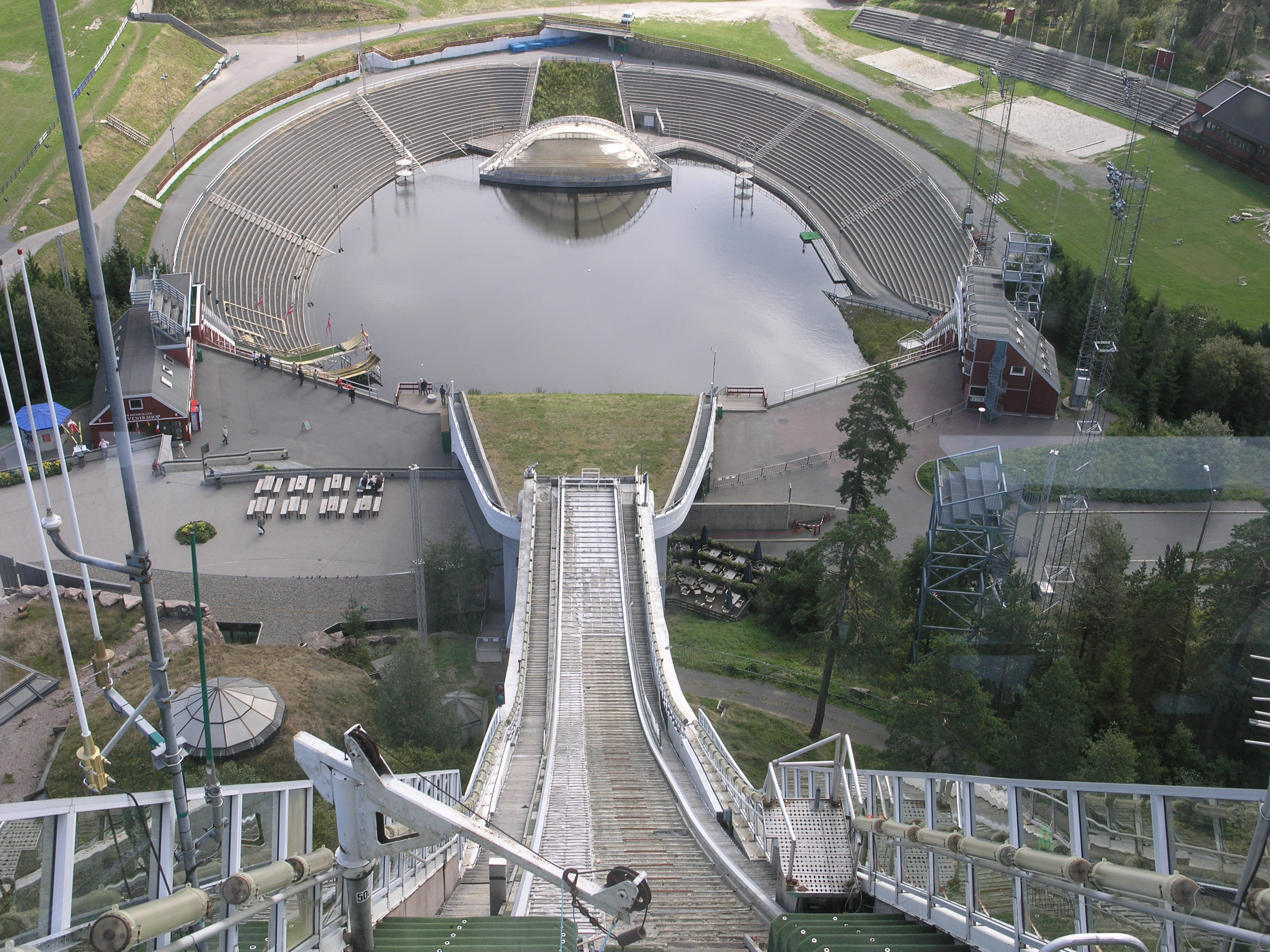
View from the old tower in summer; in the off-run is Besserudtjernet, with the stage visible opposite the in-run

The hill is part of Holmenkollen National Arena, which also consists of a combined cross-country skiing and biathlon stadium, the normal hill Midtstubakken. Along with Granåsen in Trondheim and Lysgårdsbakken in Lillehammer, Holmenkollen is one of three normal and large hill national arenas for ski jumping and Nordic skiing. The hill is the most popular tourist attraction in Norway, and has roughly one million visitors each year. Holmenkollbakken is co-located with Holmenkollen Ski Museum, which presents the history of skiing. It has a simulator which allows the public to visualize a ski jump in the hill. The hill record is 139.5 meters (458 ft), set by Anders Jacobsen in 2011, and the women's record is 131.0 m (430 ft) set by Anette Sagen in 2006.

After the 1992 upgrades, the Olympic hill had a K-spot of 110 meters (361 ft) and the top of the in-run was 417 m (1,368 ft) above mean sea level. The tower was 42 m (138 ft) tall; the top of the in-run was located behind the tower and was 60 m (200 ft) above ground, and the in-run was 94 m (308 ft) in length. The landing slope was 37 degrees at the steepest and 115 m (377 ft) in length. The vertical height difference between the top of the in-run and the off-run was 121 meters (397 ft).

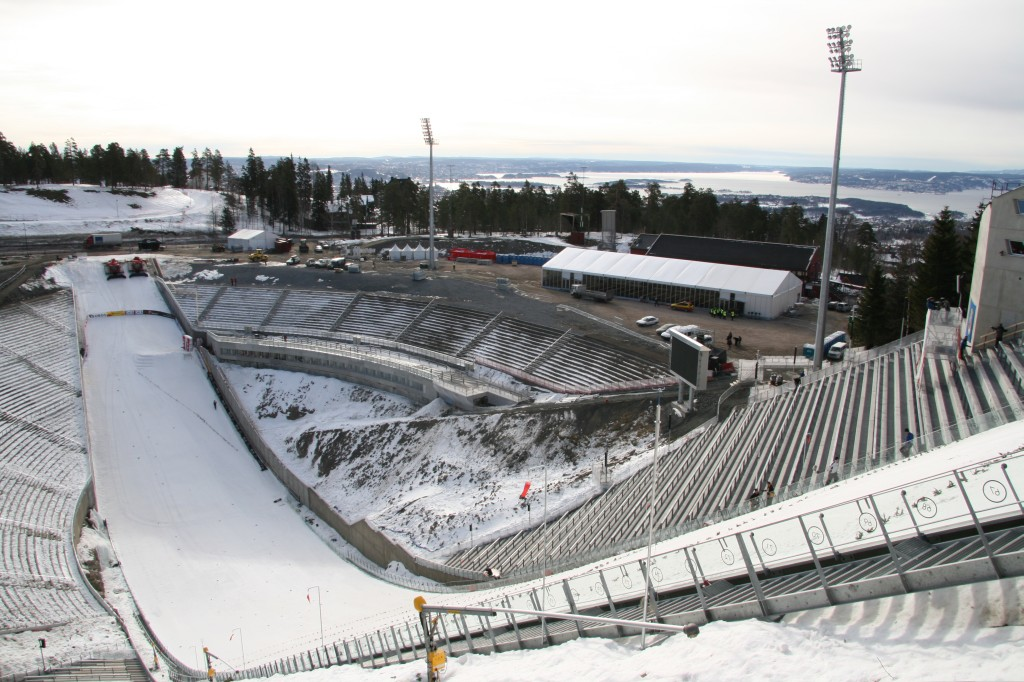
The amphitheater of the new hill

The new hill has a hill size of 134 meters (440 ft) and K-spot of 120 m (394 ft). The steepest part of the landings slope is 35.7 degrees, which is 105.6 m (346 ft) from the take-off. The angle at the hill size point is 30.8 degrees, while the width of the landing slope is 25.2 m (83 ft). The in-run, built of steel, is 96.95 meters (318 ft) long, which is 36 degrees at the steepest. The take-off is 3.0 m (9.8 ft) in height, and the height distance from take-off to the K-point is 59.1 m (194 ft). The grandstands are made of steel and concrete, and include VIP facilities. It is the only hill in the world with a permanent wind screen built as part of the designed construction, and the only steel jump in the world. The hill is 375 m (1,230 ft) above sea level; the venue is owned by Oslo Municipality and operated by the Association for the Promotion of Skiing.

Transport is based on that no spectators will use private cars to the venue. Instead, all spectators must use the Holmenkollen Line of the Oslo Metro. Holmenkollen Station is located within walking distance of the large hill and cross-country stadium. Holmenkollen Station is the only one on the line with platforms long enough for six cars, which allows a capacity of 9,000 people per hour.

== Events ==
=== Ladies ===
Date	Competition	Winner	Second	Third
12 March 2000	HSF	(Austria) Daniela Iraschko	(Austria) Eva Ganster	(Sweden) Helena Olsson
11 March 2001	HSF	(Austria) Daniela Iraschko	(Norway) Henriette Smeby	(Austria) Eva Ganster
17 March 2002	HSF	(Sweden) Helena Olsson	(Austria) Daniela Iraschko	(Norway) Henriette Smeby
9 March 2003	HSF	(Austria) Daniela Iraschko	(Norway) Anette Sagen	(Sweden) Helena Olsson
17 March 2013	WC	(United States) Sarah Hendrickson	(Japan) Sara Takanashi	(Austria) Jacqueline Seifriedsberger
8 March 2014	WC	(Japan) Sara Takanashi	(Slovenia) Katja Požun	(Japan) Yūki Itō
13 March 2015	WC	(Japan) Sara Takanashi	(United States) Sarah Hendrickson	(Canada) Taylor Henrich
4 February 2016	WC	(Japan) Sara Takanashi	(Norway) Maren Lundby	(Russia) Irina Avvakumova
12 March 2017	WC	(Japan) Yūki Itō	(Japan) Sara Takanashi	(Norway) Maren Lundby
11 March 2018	WC	(Norway) Maren Lundby	(Austria) Daniela Iraschko-Stolz	(Japan) Yūki Itō

=== Men ===
In 1896 the cross-country part of Nordic combined was cancelled and ski jumping counted as final result. Ski jumping events listed only:

Date	Competition	Winner	Second	Third
24 February 1896	HSF–NCO	(Norway) Sigurd Svendsen	(Norway) Frimann Dahl	(Norway) Robert Pehrson
28 February 1930	NWSC	(Norway) Gunnar Andersen	(Norway) Reidar Andersen	(Norway) Sigmund Ruud
5 March 1933	HSF	(Norway) Arne B. Christiansen	(Norway) Reidar Andersen	(Norway) Sverre Ruud
4 March 1934	HSF	(Norway) Birger Ruud	(Norway) Roar Hellum	(Norway) Hans Kleppen
3 March 1935	HSF	(Norway) Hans Beck	(Sweden) Sven Eriksson	(Norway) Bjarne Bryntesen
1 March 1936	HSF	(Norway) Reidar Andersen	(Norway) Sigurd Solid	(Norway) Arnholdt Kongsgård
28 February 1937	HSF	(Norway) Reidar Andersen	(Sweden) Sven Selånger	(Norway) Birger Ruud
6 March 1938	HSF	(Norway) Reidar Andersen	(Norway) Arnholdt Kongsgård	(Norway) Hilmar Myhra
5 March 1939	HSF	(Sweden) Sven Selånger	(Norway) Kaare Wahlberg	(Norway) Hilmar Myhra
3 March 1940	HSF	(Norway) Hilmar Myhra	(Norway) Reidar Andersen	(Norway) Jens Østby
1941–1945	HSF	no competition; World War II		
3 March 1946	HSF	(Norway) Asbjørn Ruud	(Norway) Thorleif Schjelderup	(Norway) Yngvar Myhra
2 March 1947	HSF	(Norway) Georg Thrane	(Norway) Henry Amdal	(Norway) Asbjørn Ruud
7 March 1948	HSF	(Norway) Arne Hoel	(Norway) Thorleif Schjelderup	(Norway) Petter Hugsted
6 March 1949	HSF	(Norway) Torbjørn Falkanger	(Finland) Matti Pietikäinen	(Norway) Jens Østby
5 March 1950	HSF	(Norway) Torbjørn Falkanger	(Norway) Hans Bjørnstad	(Norway) Petter Hugsted
25 February 1951	HSF	(Norway) Arne Hoel	(Norway) Georg Thrane	(Austria) Sepp Bradl
24 February 1952	OWG	(Norway) Arnfinn Bergmann	(Norway) Torbjørn Falkanger	(Sweden) Karl Holmström
9 March 1952	HSF	(Norway) Arnfinn Bergmann	(Norway) Christian Mohn	(Norway) Arne Hoel (Norway) Halvor Næs
1 March 1953	HSF	(Norway) Otto Austad	(Norway) Torbjørn Falkanger (Norway) Sverre Stallvik	
7 March 1954	HSF	strong wind		
4 April 1954	ELE	(Norway) Arne Hoel	(Norway) Halvor Næs	(Norway) Christian Mohn
6 March 1955	HSF	(Finland) Aulis Kallakorpi	(Finland) Eino Kirjonen (Norway) Torbjørn Falkanger	
26 February 1956	HSF	(Finland) Antti Hyvärinen	(Norway) Arne Hoel	(Finland) Aulis Kallakorpi (East Germany) Werner Lesser
3 March 1957	HSF	(East Germany) Helmut Recknagel	(Finland) Eino Kirjonen	(Finland) Juhani Kärkinen
16 March 1958	HSF	(Soviet Union) Nikolay Kamenskiy	(East Germany) Helmut Recknagel	(Soviet Union) Rudolf Bykov (Austria) Otto Leodolter
8 March 1959	HSF	(Norway) Arne Hoel	(Sweden) Inge Lindqvist (Soviet Union) Nikolay Kamenskiy	
20 March 1960	HSF	(East Germany) Helmut Recknagel	(Norway) Toralf Engan	(West Germany) Max Bolkart
12 March 1961	HSF	(Soviet Union) Nikolaj Sjamov	(Finland) Hemmo Silvennoinen	(Soviet Union) Nikolay Kamenskiy
18 March 1962	HSF	(Norway) Toralf Engan	(Austria) Willi Egger (Finland) Veikko Kankkonen	
17 March 1963	HSF	(Norway) Torbjørn Yggeseth	(United States) John Balfanz	(Sweden) Kjell Sjöberg
15 March 1964	HSF	(Finland) Veikko Kankkonen	(Norway) Toralf Engan	(Norway) Bjørn Wirkola
14 March 1965	HSF	(East Germany) Dieter Neuendorf	(Norway) Lars Grini	(Norway) Toralf Engan
27 February 1966	NWSC	(Norway) Bjørn Wirkola	(Japan) Takashi Fujisawa	(Sweden) Kjell Sjöberg
5 March 1967	HSF	(Norway) Bjørn Wirkola	(Norway) Bent Tomtum	(Austria) Max Golser
17 March 1968	HSF	(Soviet Union) Vladimir Belousov	(Norway) Bjørn Wirkola	(Socialist Federal Republic of Yugoslavia) Ludvik Zajc
16 March 1969	HSF	(Finland) Topi Mattila	(Norway) Gjert Andersen	(Czechoslovakia) Jiří Raška
15 March 1970	HSF	(Soviet Union) Vladimir Belousov	(Soviet Union) Garij Napalkov	(Czechoslovakia) Rudolf Höhnl
14 March 1971	HSF	(Norway) Ingolf Mork	(Japan) Yukio Kasaya	(Switzerland) Walter Steiner
12 March 1972	HSF	(Norway) Ingolf Mork	(Switzerland) Hans Schmid	(Japan) Akitsugu Konno
18 March 1973	HSF	(Switzerland) Hans Schmid	(East Germany) Hans-Georg Aschenbach	(Czechoslovakia) Leoš Škoda
10 March 1974	HSF	(Switzerland) Walter Steiner	(Japan) Yukio Kasaya	(Norway) Finn Halvorsen
9 March 1975	HSF	(Austria) Toni Innauer	(Norway) Odd Hammernes	(West Germany) Alfred Grosche
14 March 1976	HSF	(Austria) Karl Schnabl	(Austria) Toni Innauer	(Norway) Johan Sætre
13 March 1977	HSF	(Soviet Union) Aleksej Borovitin	(East Germany) Thomas Meisinger	(Switzerland) Walter Steiner
12 March 1978	HSF	(East Germany) Harald Duschek	(Norway) Johan Sætre	(West Germany) Peter Leitner
11 March 1979	HSF	(Norway) Per Bergerud	(Norway) Johan Sætre	(Soviet Union) Valerij Savin
16 March 1980	WC	(Austria) Armin Kogler	(Finland) Jari Puikkonen	(Austria) Hubert Neuper
15 March 1981	WC	(Norway) Roger Ruud	(Canada) Horst Bulau	(Norway) Johan Sætre
26 February 1982	NWSC / WC–T	Norway Johan Sætre; Per Bergerud; Ole Bremseth; Olav Hansson	Austria Hans Wallner; Hubert Neuper; Armin Kogler; Andreas Felder	Finland Keijo Korhonen; Jari Puikkonen; Pentti Kokkonen; Matti Nykänen
28 February 1982	NWSC–I	(Finland) Matti Nykänen	(Norway) Olav Hansson	(Austria) Armin Kogler
13 March 1983	WC	(Norway) Steinar Bråten	(Canada) Horst Bulau	(Austria) Armin Kogler
11 March 1984	WC	(Czechoslovakia) Vladimír Podzimek	(Czechoslovakia) Pavel Ploc	(Norway) Ole Christian Eidhammer
10 March 1985	WC	(Finland) Matti Nykänen	(Austria) Franz Wiegele	(Switzerland) Gérard Balanche
16 March 1986	WC	(Austria) Ernst Vettori	(Finland) Matti Nykänen	(Austria) Andreas Felder
22 March 1987	WC	(Austria) Andreas Felder	(Finland) Ari-Pekka Nikkola	(Socialist Federal Republic of Yugoslavia) Miran Tepeš
20 March 1988	WC	(Norway) Erik Johnsen	(Norway) Ole Gunnar Fidjestøl	(Austria) Günther Stranner
5 March 1989	WC	(East Germany) Jens Weißflog	(Norway) Jon Inge Kjørum	(Norway) Kent Johanssen
18 March 1990	HSF	(East Germany) Jens Weißflog	(Austria) Andreas Felder	(Czechoslovakia) Pavel Ploc
17 March 1991	WC	(Austria) Ernst Vettori	(Austria) Stefan Horngacher	(Sweden) Staffan Tällberg
15 March 1992	WC	(Finland) Toni Nieminen	(Czechoslovakia) Jiří Parma	(Austria) Martin Höllwarth
14 March 1993	WC	(Norway) Espen Bredesen	(France) Didier Mollard	(Czech Republic) Jaroslav Sakala
13 March 1994	WC	strong wind		
12 March 1995	WC	(Austria) Andreas Goldberger	(Japan) Takanobu Okabe	(Germany) Jens Weißflog
15 March 1996	WC–T	Austria Martin Höllwarth; Reinhard Schwarzenberger; Andreas Widhölzl; Andreas Goldberger	Norway Pål Hansen; Sturle Holseter; Espen Bredesen; Roar Ljøkelsøy	Germany Gerd Siegmund; Michael Uhrmann; Christof Duffner; Jens Weißflog
17 March 1996	WC	(Poland) Adam Małysz	(Finland) Janne Ahonen	(Japan) Masahiko Harada
16 March 1997	WC	(Japan) Kazuyoshi Funaki	(Japan) Hiroya Saitō	(Switzerland) Bruno Reuteler
15 March 1998	WC	(Slovenia) Primož Peterka	(Switzerland) Bruno Reuteler	(Japan) Masahiko Harada
14 March 1999	WC	(Japan) Noriaki Kasai	(Germany) Martin Schmitt	(Japan) Kazuyoshi Funaki
12 March 2000	WC	(Germany) Sven Hannawald	(Finland) Ville Kantee	(Finland) Janne Ahonen
11 March 2001	WC	(Poland) Adam Małysz	(Austria) Stefan Horngacher	(Germany) Martin Schmitt
17 March 2002	WC	(Switzerland) Simon Ammann	(Germany) Sven Hannawald	(Poland) Adam Małysz
8 March 2003	WC–T	Austria Florian Liegl; Thomas Morgenstern; Christian Nagiller; Andreas Widhölzl	Finland Matti Hautamäki; Veli-Matti Lindström; Tami Kiuru; Arttu Lappi	Germany Michael Uhrmann; Martin Schmitt; Sven Hannawald; Georg Späth
9 March 2003	WC	(Poland) Adam Małysz	(Norway) Roar Ljøkelsøy (Austria) Florian Liegl	
14 March 2004	WC	(Norway) Roar Ljøkelsøy	(Switzerland) Simon Ammann	(Norway) Bjørn Einar Romøren
13 March 2005	WC	(Finland) Matti Hautamäki	(Norway) Bjørn Einar Romøren	(Germany) Michael Uhrmann
12 March 2006	WC	(Poland) Adam Małysz	(Austria) Thomas Morgenstern	(Austria) Andreas Kofler
17 March 2007	WC	(Poland) Adam Małysz	(Switzerland) Andreas Küttel	(Norway) Anders Bardal
18 March 2007	WC	(Switzerland) Simon Ammann	(Austria) Martin Koch	(Finland) Matti Hautamäki
9 March 2008	WC	(Austria) Gregor Schlierenzauer	(Norway) Tom Hilde	(Norway) Bjørn Einar Romøren
2009	WC	under renovation; substituted with Vikersund		
14 March 2010	WC	(Switzerland) Simon Ammann	(Poland) Adam Małysz	(Austria) Andreas Kofler
(night) 3 March 2011	NWSC–I	(Austria) Gregor Schlierenzauer	(Austria) Thomas Morgenstern	(Switzerland) Simon Ammann
5 March 2011	NWSC–T	Austria Gregor Schlierenzauer; Martin Koch; Andreas Kofler; Thomas Morgenstern	Norway Anders Jacobsen; Johan Remen Evensen; Anders Bardal; Tom Hilde	Slovenia Peter Prevc; Jurij Tepeš; Jernej Damjan; Robert Kranjec
11 March 2012	WC	(Austria) Martin Koch	(Germany) Severin Freund	(Slovenia) Robert Kranjec
17 March 2013	WC	(Austria) Gregor Schlierenzauer (Poland) Piotr Żyła		(Slovenia) Robert Kranjec
9 March 2014	WC	(Germany) Severin Freund	(Norway) Anders Bardal	(Poland) Kamil Stoch
(night) 14 March 2015	WC	(Germany) Severin Freund	(Slovenia) Peter Prevc	(Norway) Rune Velta
15 March 2015	WC	(Germany) Severin Freund	(Japan) Noriaki Kasai	(Slovenia) Peter Prevc (Poland) Kamil Stoch
(night) 6 February 2016	WC–T	Slovenia Jurij Tepeš; Domen Prevc; Robert Kranjec; Peter Prevc	Norway Daniel-André Tande; Anders Fannemel; Johann André Forfang; Kenneth Gangnes	Japan Taku Takeuchi; Kento Sakuyama; Daiki Itō; Noriaki Kasai
7 February 2016	WC	heavy fog; replaced by ski flying event in Vikersund		
10 March 2017	WC/RA(Q)–prol.	(Germany) Andreas Wellinger	(Slovenia) Peter Prevc	(Germany) Richard Freitag
11 March 2017	WC/RA–T	Austria Michael Hayböck; Manuel Fettner; Markus Schiffner; Stefan Kraft	Germany Markus Eisenbichler; Stephan Leyhe; Richard Freitag; Andreas Wellinger	Poland Piotr Żyła; Kamil Stoch; Dawid Kubacki; Maciej Kot
12 March 2017	WC/RA–I	(Austria) Stefan Kraft	(Germany) Andreas Wellinger	(Germany) Markus Eisenbichler
9 March 2018	WC/RA(Q)–prol.	(Poland) Kamil Stoch	(Norway) Robert Johansson	(Germany) Richard Freitag
10 March 2018	WC/RA–T	Norway Daniel-André Tande; Andreas Stjernen; Johann André Forfang; Robert Johansson	Poland Maciej Kot; Stefan Hula Jr. Dawid Kubacki; Kamil Stoch	Austria Gregor Schlierenzauer; Clemens Aigner; Michael Hayböck; Stefan Kraft
11 March 2018	WC/RA–I	(Norway) Daniel-André Tande	(Austria) Stefan Kraft	(Austria) Michael Hayböck

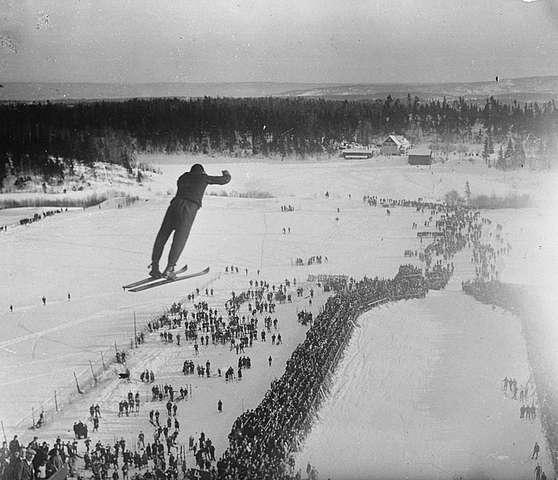
Ski jumper in 1924

The Holmenkollen Ski Festival is an annual Nordic skiing event which takes places at Holmenkollen. Until 1932, jumping was part of Nordic combined, and the events were completely dominated by Norwegians. In 1903, Oslo hosted its only version of the Nordic Games, dubbed the Winter Sports Week. Regarded as the precursor of the Winter Olympics, the event featured among other things ski jumping in Holmenkollbakken. The Ski Festival was first held on a Sunday in 1926. Starting in 1933, there was a pure ski jumping competition, which made it easier for foreign jumping specialists to compete for the top positions. Originally, the style scores were secret, creating public discussions about the fairness of judges in even races. This was changed in 1951, when the style scores started being announced over the PA system.

The Holmenkollen Ski Festival has been regarded as the de facto World Championships prior to the 1924 Winter Olympics. The Norwegian Ski Federation had been an opponent of establishing World Championships and Winter Olympics because they felt it would take away the prestige of the Ski Festival. Oslo was awarded the FIS Nordic World Ski Championships 1930; with exception of Sweden's Erik Rylandet who finished fifth, Norway had the top ten positions.

Holmenkollen was the venue of the Nordic skiing during the 1952 Winter Olympics. Two events were held at Holmenkollbakken: ski jumping and the jumping part of Nordic combined. The exact number of people attending the ski jumping event on 24 February is not known, but it somewhere between 120,000 and 150,000, with the official report stating 143,000. The event was won by Arnfinn Bergmann ahead of Torbjørn Falkanger, both from Norway, and Karl Holmström of Sweden.

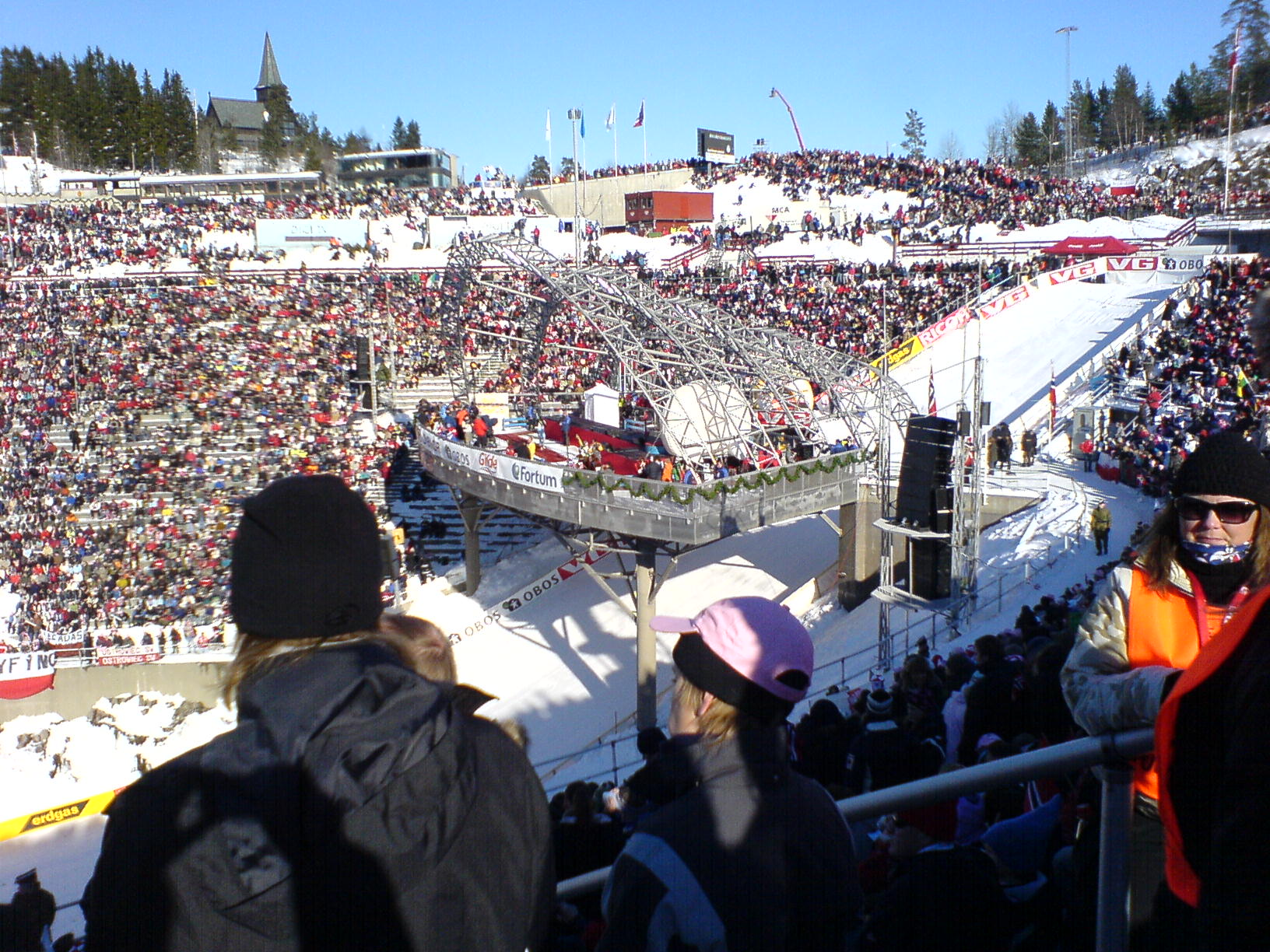
The off-run during the 2005–06 FIS Ski Jumping World Cup; the stage is mounted above the off-run

The next World Championship was held in 1966. By then both normal and large hill competitions had been introduced, and the normal hill competition would be held at Midtstubakken, as they would later also be done in 1982 and 2011. The 1966 large hill competition was won by Norway's Bjørn Wirkola, while the 1982 event was won by Matti Nykänen of Finland.

From the 1979–80 season, FIS introduced the Ski Jumping World Cup. The FIS Nordic Combined World Cup was first held in the 1983–84 season. By 1990, a conflict had arisen between the ski jumpers and the International Ski Federation. On the day of the Ski Festival, the jumpers collectively demanded NOK 150,000 in increased prize money, or threatened to not jump. It was stated that the money would be used for charity, such as resurrecting Romanian ski jumping. The demand was rejected by the organizers, who stated that they would have to disqualify the jumpers, as they would be regarded as professionals, rather than amateurs. Since 1997, the World Cup jumps in Holmenkollen have been part of the Nordic Tournament, which includes four successive jumps in four Norwegian, Swedish and Finnish ski jumps, inspired by the Four Hills Tournament.

During summer, the old hill had a lake, which made it possible to use the amphitheater for concerts, plays and entertainment. The venue was then often referred to as Sommerkollen. From 1963, a temporary, small in-run was built down the southern grandstand, which allowed skiers and divers to make a jump and land in the water. Between 1963 and 1983, a competition was held nine times. Starting in 1983 was Ta sjansen, which was televised annually by the Norwegian Broadcasting Corporation and became Sommerkollen's most popular show. It was an informal competition with two main events: one where a home-made craft was to first slide down a short in-run and then slide along the water surface to hit a mounted bell in the shortest possible time. The other was a cycling competition where the cyclist had to complete a track on a wobbly floating wharf.
