= Asgeir Dølplads =

Norwegian ski jumper (1932–2023)

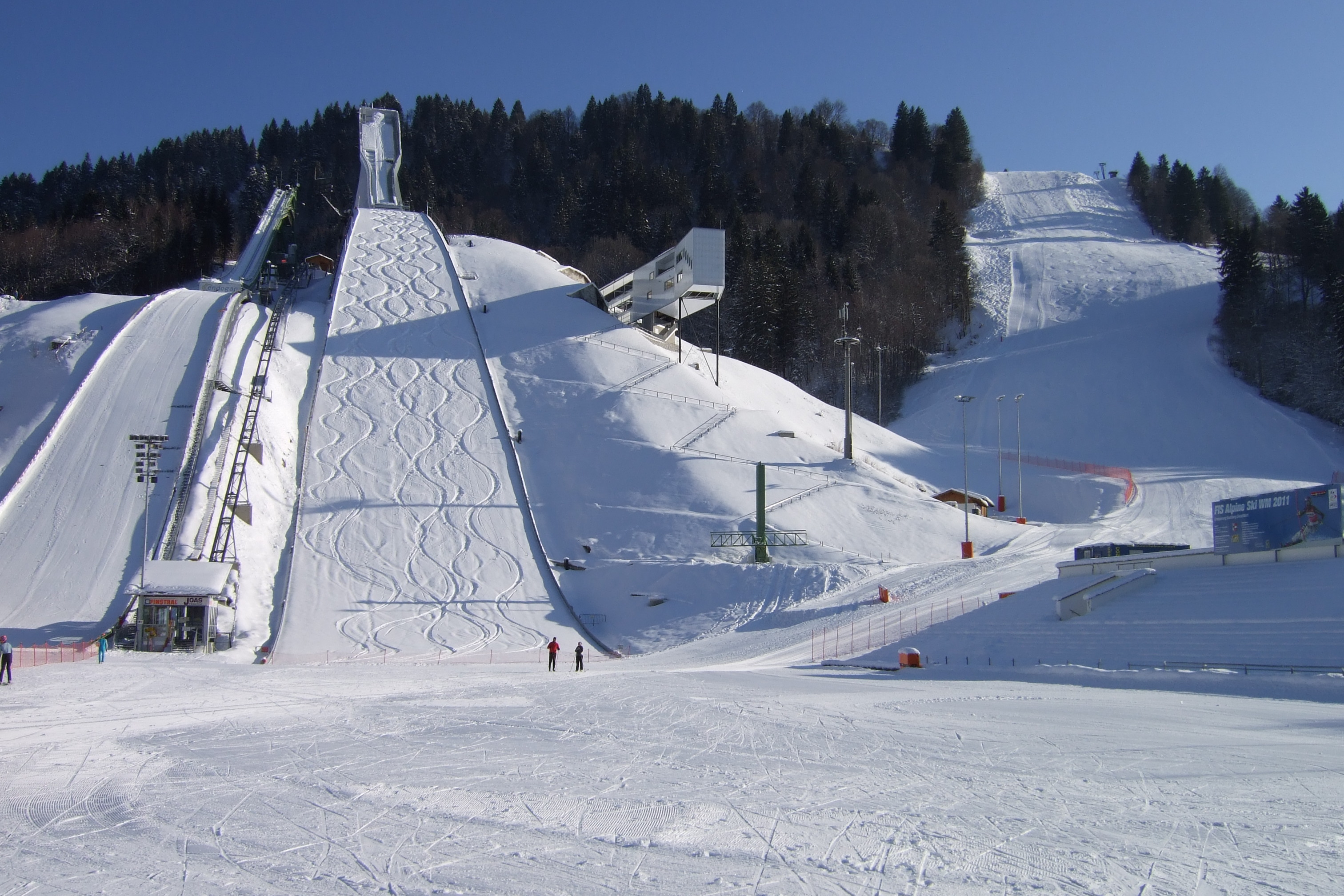
- A place where people can ski jump.

Personal information
- Born: 26 August 1932
- Died: 26 September 2023 (aged 91)

Sport
- Country: Norway
- Sport: Skiing
- Club: Rena IL and Stabæk IF

Asgeir Dølplads (26 August 1932 – 26 September 2023) was a Norwegian ski jumper.

On 1 January 1953, he became the first ever winner of the Garmisch-Partenkirchen New Year's ski jump competition, an integral part of the Four Hills Tournament. With jumps of 78.5 and 81 metres, Dølplads won ahead of Austrian Sepp Bradl and German Toni Brutscher. In the ensuing competitions in Oberstdorf, Innsbruck and Bischofshofen, Dølplads was ranked 3, 2, and 7, landing him an overall 3rd prize, after Bradl and fellow Norwegian Halvor Næs.

Dølplads represented Rena IL and Stabæk IF during his career.

Dølplads was actively involved in recruitment to ski jumping at and around Rena, where Rena IL operates one of Norway's leading K120 ski jumping hills.

Dølplads was the father-in-law of popular Norwegian comedian Atle Antonsen.
