= Heini-Klopfer-Skiflugschanze =

Ski flying hill in Oberstdorf, Germany

Coordinates: 47°22′31″N 10°16′09″E

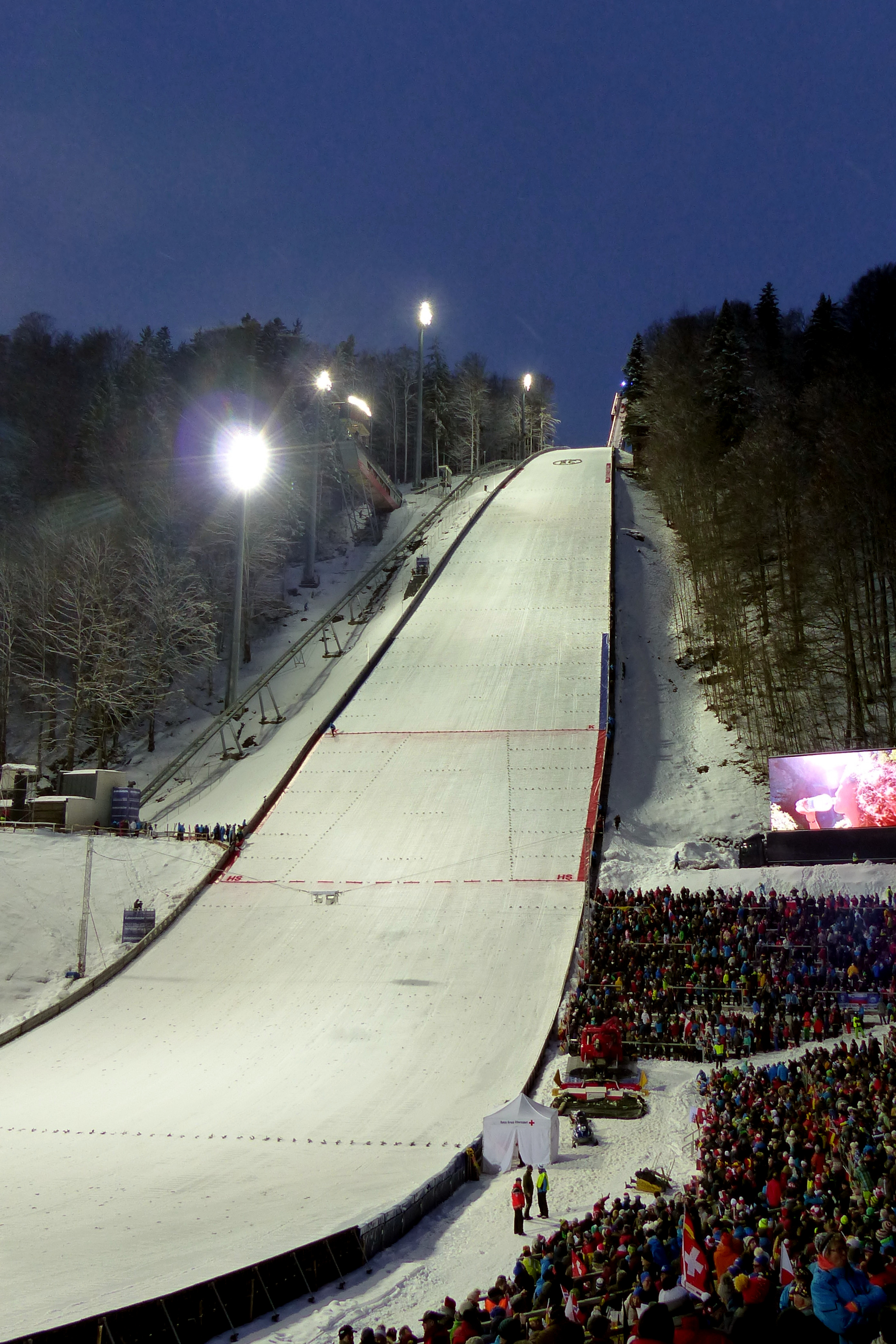
- The hill in 2018
- Constructor: Heini Klopfer
- Location: Oberstdorf; Germany
- Operator: SC Oberstdorf
- Opened: 2 February 1950 (test); 28 February 1950 (official)
- Renovated: 1973; 1981; 1984; 1986; 1998; 2001; 2017

Size
- K–point: 200 m (660 ft)
- Hill size: 235 m (771 ft)
- Hill record: 242.5 m (796 ft) (Slovenia) Domen Prevc (20 March 2022)
- Spectator capacity: 40,000

Top events
- Ski Flying World Championships: 1973; 1981; 1988; 1998; 2008; 2018

Heini-Klopfer-Skiflugschanze (Heini Klopfer Ski Flying Hill) is a ski flying hill in Oberstdorf, Germany. It was opened in 1950, and was later renamed after its architect, Heini Klopfer. A total of 21 world records have been set on the hill. The venue should not be confused with the Schattenberg ski jumping hill, also in Oberstdorf, about 7 kilometres (4.3 mi) to the north.

== History ==
=== 1949: Plans and realisation ===
In 1949, they were originally discussing about whether they should just rather enlarge the existing Schattenbergschanze or build a complete new hill with calculation point at K120.

Three ski jumpers Heini Klopfer, Sepp Weiler and Toni Brutscher together made a final decision to build a complete new hill and they found the perfect location. Inspired by Planica, they wanted to beat legendary Bloudkova velikanka in Slovenia, as the long time world record breaking and leading hill. Starting in July, hill construction was completed as planned in only five months, finished on 10 December.

=== 1950: Opening with four world records ===
On 2 February 1950, hill test was reserved for founding trio only. Heini Klopfer jumped as first ever landing at 90 metres, Toni Brutscher at 112 metres and Sepp Weiler at 115 metres.

From 28 February to 5 March 1950, hill was officially opened with ski flying week, which was a just a copy of the competition format from Planica. Between 60,000 and 170,000 people have gathered in total.

On 28 February, Austrian ski jumper Willi Gantschnigg set the first official world record at 124 metres (408 feet) and two days later broke his leg crashing at 130 metres (427 ft) world record distance.

On 2 March, Sepp Weiler improved world record at 127 metres (417 feet). And Austrian Hans Eder was disqualiefied at 130 metres (427 ft) world record distance.

On 3 March, records were beat again by Andreas Däscher at 130 metres (427 feet) and Dan Netzell at 135 metres (443 feet). After both of them Sepp Weiler landed at 133 metres (436 feet). (Note: 3 March 1950: According to official German radio report cited in Ljudska pravica (slovenian newspaper), jumps were following in that order: first Andreas Däscher (130 m), then Dan Netzell (135 m) and after both of them Sepp Weiler (133 m).)

=== 1951: Ski Flying Week II with world record ===
From 28 February to 4 March 1951, the second Ski Flying Week was held, with over 120,000 spectators attending. Tauno Luiro from Finland set the official world record at 139 metres (456 feet) on the third day of competition.

=== 1952: Ski Flying Week III ===
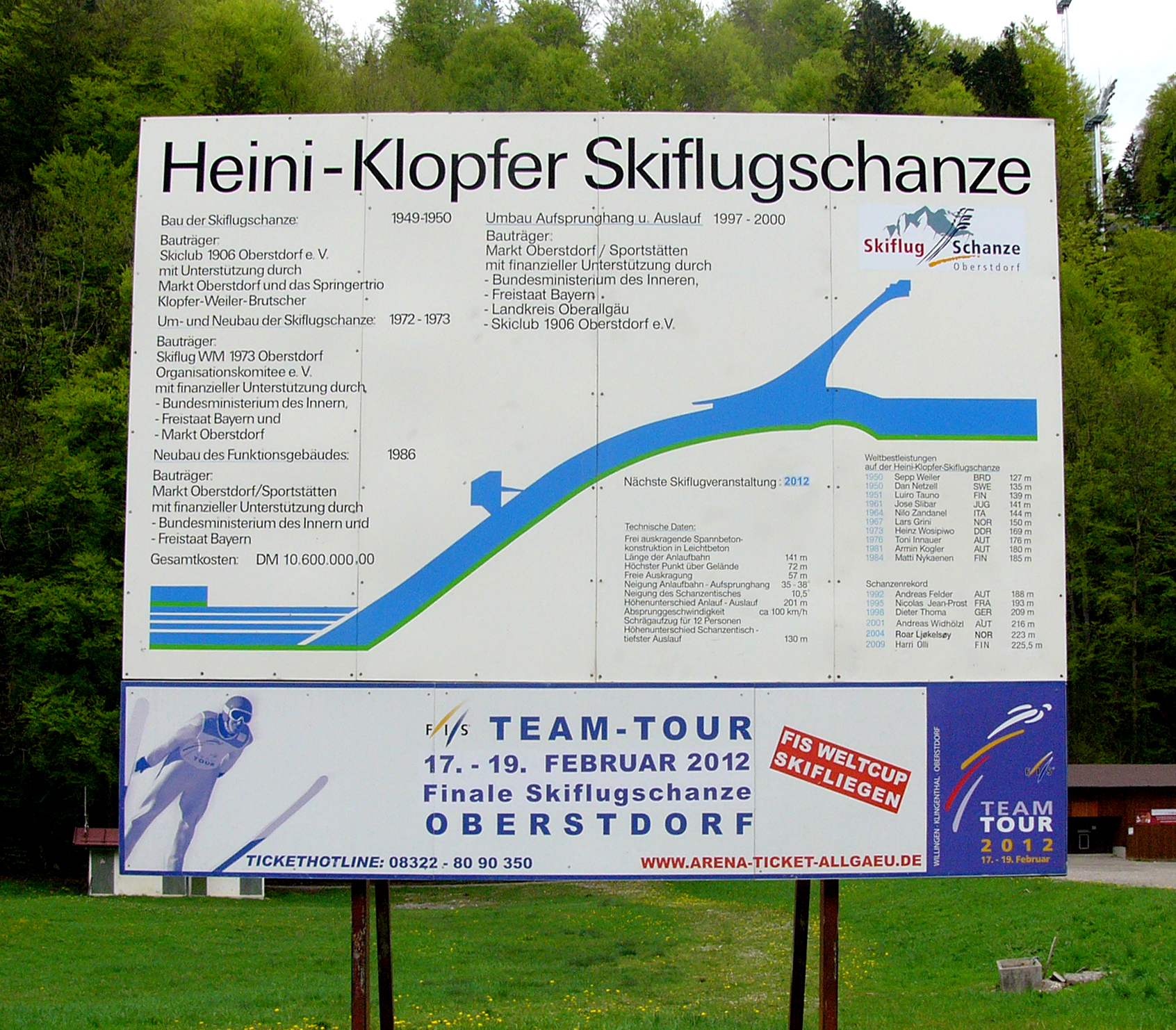
Hill construction timeline.

From 28 February to 2 March 1952, third Ski Flying Week took place, with over 60,000 attendees. Competition was interrupted on all three days due to weather conditions. FIS committee decided to grade distances only. No official results was published.

All jumpers that exceeded 100 metres distances, received a commemorative needle engraved with the distance achieved. Toivo Lauren from set the longest distance of the weekend at 131 metres (430 ft).

=== 1955: Ski Flying Week IV ===
From 26 to 27 February 1955, fourth Ski Flying Week was held. Four jumps in total, two from each day, counted into official results. Hemmo Silvennoinen won the competition with 452.5 points in front of Alfredsen and Brutscher.

=== 1958: Bolkart fell at WR distance ===
On 21 March 1958, first day of Ski Flying Week V was held in front of 5,000 people. Trial jumps (reserved competition day) opened by Toni Brutscher at 97 metres were held, which would conditionally count into official results, if one of two competition days would be canceled due to weather conditions. 36 ski jumpers from ten different countries were on start, jumps were scored and judged by Straumann method. Aarne Valkama made a top score with 239.8 points (136 and 126 metres).

On 22 March 1958, first competition day was held in front of 18,000 people. Only one of 35 jumpers didn't beat 100 metres mark. Andreas Däscher made a top score today with 237.8 points (125 and 128 metres).

On 23 March 1958, last competition day was held in front of 50,000 people. West German Max Bolkart fell at 139 metres (456 feet) world record distance. Helmut Recknagel (378.8 points) won in front of Däscher (369.6 points) and Vitikainen (351.6 points).

=== 1961: Šlibar set new world record at 141 metres ===
On 23 February 1961, first day of Ski Flying Week VI was held in front of 8,000 people, with first trial jumps in three rounds. Among 36 jumpers, Otto Leodolter, Maatela and Wolfgang Happle set the distance of the day at 136 metres (446 ft).

On 24 February 1961, second day of Ski Flying Week VI was held in front of 20,000 people, second trial jumps in two rounds (reserved day), which would conditionally count into official results, if one of next two competition days would be canceled due to weather conditions. In the second round at 13:41 local time, Yugoslavian (Slovenian) Jože Šlibar set the new WR at 141 metres (463 feet), with 103 km/h at take-off. Heini Klopfer himself was measuring the distance for half an hour, then published it.

On 25 February 1961, first competition day with two rounds counting into final results, first round was canceled. Wolfgang Happle from West Germany fell at 145 metres (476 feet) world record distance.

On 26 February 1961, second and final competition day in front of 50,000 people was held. Three rounds, two best (and total four) rounds counted into final results. Helmut Recknagel from East Germany won the two-day competition.

=== 1964: Sjöberg, Motejlek and Zandanel set world records ===
On 14 February 1964, first day of Ski Flying Week VII was held in front of 3,000 people, an official training (reserved competition day) in two round, which would conditionally count into official results, if one of next two competition days would be canceled due to weather conditions. 36 jumpers from 12 countries performed today. Kjell Sjöberg from Sweden tied Šlibar's world record at 141 metres (463 feet). Points sistem scoring was classic, as Straumann's device didn't work properly.

On 15 February 1964, first competition day in front of 20,000 people was held, with three rounds, two best into final results. Dalibor Motejlek from Czechoslovakia set the new world record at 142 metres (466 feet).

On 16 February 1964, second and final competition day was held. Three rounds today, two best (and total four) rounds counted into final results. Nilo Zandanel from Italy set the new world record at 144 metres (472 feet).

== Events ==
FIS Ski Flying World Championships (in 1998 also the World Cup event.)

Date	Year	Hillsize	Winner	Second	Third
↓ FIS International Ski Flying Week ↓
28 February — 5 March	1950	K120	(West Germany) Sepp Weiler	(Switzerland) Andreas Däscher	(Sweden) Dan Netzell
28 February — 4 March	1951	K122	(Finland) Tauno Luiro	(Switzerland) Fritz Schneider	(Austria) Sepp Bradl
28 February — 2 March	1952	K120	International Ski Federation did not allow organizers to publish official results; jury was allowed to score and publish only distances, not style		
26–27 February	1955		(Finland) Hemmo Silvennoinen	(Norway) Jack Alfredsen	(Germany) Toni Brutscher
22–23 March	1958		(East Germany) Helmut Recknagel	(Switzerland) Andreas Däscher	(Finland) Raimo Vitikainen
25–26 February	1961		(East Germany) Helmut Recknagel	(Austria) Otto Leodolter	(West Germany) Wolfgang Happle
↓ K.O.P. International Ski Flying Week ↓
15–16 February	1964		(Sweden) Kjell Sjöberg	(Finland) Paavo Lukkariniemi	(Italy) Nilo Zandanel
11–12 February	1967		(Norway) Lars Grini	(East Germany) Peter Lesser	(Sweden) Kjell Sjöberg
8–9 March	1970		(Czechoslovakia) Josef Matouš	(Czechoslovakia) Rudolf Höhnl	(Austria) Reinhold Bachler
↓ 2nd FIS Ski Flying World Championships ↓
10–11 March	1973	K175	(East Germany) Hans-Georg Aschenbach	(Switzerland) Walter Steiner	(Czechoslovakia) Karel Kodejška
↓ K.O.P. International Ski Flying Week ↓
5–7 March	1976	K175	(Austria) Toni Innauer	(East Germany) Heinz Wosipiwo	(Austria) Hans Wallner
2–4 March	1979	K175	(East Germany) Andreas Hille	(Czechoslovakia) Josef Samek	(Czechoslovakia) Leoš Škoda
↓ 6th FIS Ski Flying World Championships ↓
28 February — 1 March	1981	K175	(Finland) Jari Puikkonen	(Austria) Armin Kogler	(Norway) Tom Levorstad
↓ FIS World Cup ↓
17 March	1984	K180	(Finland) Matti Nykänen	(Czechoslovakia) Pavel Ploc	(East Germany) Jens Weißflog
18 March	1984	K180	(Finland) Matti Nykänen	(East Germany) Jens Weißflog	(Czechoslovakia) Pavel Ploc
↓ 10th FIS Ski Flying World Championships ↓
13 March	1988	K182	(Norway) Ole Gunnar Fidjestøl	(Socialist Federal Republic of Yugoslavia) Primož Ulaga	(Finland) Matti Nykänen
↓ FIS World Cup ↓
25 January	1992	K182	(Austria) Werner Rathmayr	(Austria) Andreas Felder	(Sweden) Mikael Martinsson
26 January	1992	K182	(Austria) Werner Rathmayr	(Austria) Andreas Felder	(Austria) Andreas Goldberger
25 February	1995	K182	(Austria) Andreas Goldberger	(Italy) Roberto Cecon	(Germany) Jens Weißflog
26 February	1995	K182	cancelled due to heavy snowfall		
↓ 15th FIS Ski Flying World Championships = FIS World Cup ↓
24 January	1998	K185	(Germany) Sven Hannawald	(Japan) Kazuyoshi Funaki	(Norway) Kristian Brenden
25 January	1998	K185	(Japan) Kazuyoshi Funaki	(Germany) Dieter Thoma	(Germany) Sven Hannawald
Championships (24–25 January)			(Japan) Kazuyoshi Funaki	(Germany) Sven Hannawald	(Germany) Dieter Thoma
↓ FIS World Cup ↓
3 March	2001	K185	(Finland) Risto Jussilainen	(Finland) Veli-Matti Lindström	(Finland) Matti Hautamäki
4 March	2001	K185	(Germany) Martin Schmitt	(Poland) Adam Małysz	(Finland) Risto Jussilainen
7 February	2004	K185	(Norway) Roar Ljokelsoy	(Finland) Janne Ahonen	(Japan) Noriaki Kasai
8 February	2004	K185	cancelled due to strong wind		
27 January	2007	HS213	lack of snow; rescheduled to nearby Schattenbergschanze HS137 large hill		
28 January	2007	HS213	lack of snow; rescheduled to nearby Schattenbergschanze HS137 large hill		
↓ 20th FIS Ski Flying World Championships ↓
22–23 February	2008	HS213	(Austria) Gregor Schlierenzauer	(Austria) Martin Koch	(Finland) Janne Ahonen
24 February	2008	HS213	Austria	Finland	Norway
↓ FIS World Cup ↓
14 February	2009	HS213	(Finland) Harri Olli	(Norway) Anders Jacobsen	(Norway) Johan Remen Evensen
15 February	2009	HS213	Finland	Russia	Austria
30 January	2010	HS213	Austria	Norway	Finland
31 January	2010	HS213	(Norway) Anders Jacobsen	(Slovenia) Robert Kranjec	(Norway) Johan Remen Evensen
5 February	2011	HS213	(Austria) Martin Koch	(Norway) Tom Hilde	(Austria) Gregor Schlierenzauer
6 February	2011	HS213	Austria	Norway	Germany
18 February	2012	HS213	(Austria) Martin Koch	(Japan) Daiki Ito	(Switzerland) Simon Ammann
19 February	2012	HS213	Slovenia	Austria	Norway
16 February	2013	HS213	(Germany) Richard Freitag	(Norway) Andreas Stjernen	(Austria) Gregor Schlierenzauer
17 February	2013	HS213	Norway	Austria	Slovenia
4 February	2017	HS225	(Austria) Stefan Kraft	(Germany) Andreas Wellinger	(Poland) Kamil Stoch
5 February	2017	HS225	(Austria) Stefan Kraft	(Germany) Andreas Wellinger	(Slovenia) Jurij Tepes
↓ 25th FIS Ski Flying World Championships ↓
19–20 February	2018	HS235	(Norway) Daniel-André Tande	(Poland) Kamil Stoch	(Germany) Richard Freitag
21 January	2018	HS235	Norway	Slovenia	Poland
↓ FIS World Cup ↓
1 February	2019	HS235	(Slovenia) Timi Zajc	(Poland) Dawid Kubacki	(Germany) Markus Eisenbichler
2 February	2019	HS235	(Japan) Ryōyū Kobayashi	(Germany) Markus Eisenbichler	(Austria) Stefan Kraft
3 February	2019	HS235	(Poland) Kamil Stoch	(Russia) Evgeniy Klimov	(Poland) Dawid Kubacki
19 March	2022	HS235	(Austria) Stefan Kraft	(Slovenia) Žiga Jelar	(Slovenia) Timi Zajc
20 March	2022	HS235	(Slovenia) Timi Zajc	(Poland) Piotr Żyła	(Austria) Stefan Kraft

== Hill record ==
List of all hill and world records set on this hill (both official and invalid record distances with fall or touch).

No.	Date		Length
HT	2 February 1950	(Germany) Heini Klopfer	90.0 m (295 ft)
HT	2 February 1950	(Germany) Sepp Weiler	110.0 m (361 ft)
HT	2 February 1950	(Germany) Sepp Weiler	115.0 m (377 ft)
#47	28 February 1950	(Austria) Willi Gantschnigg	124.0 m (408 ft)
DQ	2 March 1950	(Austria) Hans Eder	130.0 m (427 ft)
F	2 March 1950	(Austria) Willi Gantschnigg	130.0 m (427 ft)
#48	2 March 1950	(Germany) Sepp Weiler	127.0 m (417 ft)
#49	3 March 1950	(Switzerland) Andreas Däscher	130.0 m (427 ft)
#50	3 March 1950	(Sweden) Dan Netzell	135.0 m (443 ft)
#51	2 March 1951	(Finland) Tauno Luiro	139.0 m (456 ft)
F	23 March 1958	(Germany) Max Bolkart	139.0 m (456 ft)
#52	24 February 1961	(Socialist Federal Republic of Yugoslavia) Jože Šlibar	141.0 m (463 ft)
F	25 February 1961	(Germany) Wolfgang Happle	145.0 m (476 ft)
#54	15 February 1964	(Sweden) Kjell Sjöberg	141.0 m (463 ft)
#55	15 February 1964	(Czechoslovakia) Dalibor Motejlek	142.0 m (466 ft)
#56	16 February 1964	(Italy) Nilo Zandanel	144.0 m (472 ft)
#60	10 February 1967	(Norway) Lars Grini	147.0 m (482 ft)
#61	10 February 1967	(Sweden) Kjell Sjöberg	148.0 m (486 ft)
#62	11 February 1967	(Norway) Lars Grini	150.0 m (492 ft)
HR	8 March 1973	(Austria) Walter Schwabl	151.0 m (495 ft)
HR	8 March 1973	(Austria) Rudi Wanner	158.0 m (518 ft)
HR	8 March 1973	(East Germany) Heinz Wosipiwo	161.0 m (528 ft)
HR	8 March 1973	(Austria) Walter Schwabl	162.0 m (531 ft)
F	8 March 1973	(East Germany) Jochen Danneberg	166.0 m (545 ft)
F	8 March 1973	(Japan) Takao Itō	176.0 m (577 ft)
F	9 March 1973	(Switzerland) Walter Steiner	175.0 m (574 ft)
#69	9 March 1973	(East Germany) Heinz Wosipiwo	169.0 m (554 ft)
F	11 March 1973	(Switzerland) Walter Steiner	179.0 m (587 ft)
#71	4 March 1976	(Norway) Geir Ove Berg	173.0 m (568 ft)
#72	5 March 1976	(Austria) Anton Innauer	174.0 m (571 ft)

No.	Date		Length
#73	5 March 1976	(East Germany) Falko Weißpflog	174.0 m (571 ft)
#74	7 March 1976	(Austria) Anton Innauer	176.0 m (577 ft)
#77	26 February 1981	(Austria) Armin Kogler	180.0 m (591 ft)
#79	16 March 1984	(Finland) Matti Nykänen	182.0 m (597 ft)
#80	16 March 1984	(Finland) Matti Nykänen	182.0 m (597 ft)
#81	17 March 1984	(Finland) Matti Nykänen	185.0 m (607 ft)
HR	24 January 1992	(Austria) Andreas Felder	188.0 m (617 ft)
HR	23 February 1995	(France) Nicolas Jean-Prost	193.0 m (633 ft)
FH	25 February 1995	(Austria) Andreas Goldberger	196.0 m (643 ft)
FH	26 February 1995	(Austria) Andreas Goldberger	196.0 m (643 ft)
HR	22 January 1998	(Germany) Dieter Thoma	197.0 m (646 ft)
HR	23 January 1998	(Norway) Lasse Ottesen	200.0 m (656 ft)
HR	23 January 1998	(Austria) Stefan Horngacher	200.5 m (658 ft)
HR	23 January 1998	(Germany) Sven Hannawald	202.0 m (663 ft)
HR	25 January 1998	(Norway) Lasse Ottesen	202.0 m (663 ft)
HR	25 January 1998	(Germany) Sven Hannawald	205.0 m (673 ft)
HR	25 January 1998	(Germany) Dieter Thoma	207.0 m (679 ft)
HR	25 January 1998	(Germany) Dieter Thoma	209.0 m (686 ft)
HR	1 March 2001	(Austria) Andreas Widhölzl	211.0 m (692 ft)
HR	1 March 2001	(Austria) Andreas Widhölzl	216.0 m (709 ft)
FH	2 March 2001	(Finland) Veli-Matti Lindström	218.0 m (715 ft)
HR	7 February 2004	(Norway) Roar Ljøkelsøy	223.0 m (732 ft)
HR	14 February 2009	(Finland) Harri Olli	225.5 m (740 ft)
FH	30 January 2010	(Slovenia) Robert Kranjec	226.0 m (741 ft)
FH	19 February 2012	(Slovenia) Peter Prevc	225.5 m (740 ft)
HR	3 February 2017	(Austria) Stefan Kraft	229.0 m (751 ft)
HR	4 February 2017	(Germany) Andreas Wellinger	234.5 m (769 ft)
HR	5 February 2017	(Germany) Andreas Wellinger	238.0 m (781 ft)
HR	19 January 2018	(Norway) Daniel-André Tande	238.5 m (782 ft)
HR	20 March 2022	(Slovenia) Domen Prevc	242.5 m (796 ft)

Invalid. Fall at hill record distance.
Invalid. Fall at world record distance.
Disqualified. At world record distance.
