= Hans Däscher =

Swiss ski jumper

Hans Däscher (born 29 June 1930) was a Swiss ski jumper who competed during the 1950s. He finished 20th in the individual large hill event at the 1952 Winter Olympics in Oslo. Däscher's best individual finish was 18th in a normal hill event in Austria in 1955. His brother, Andreas Däscher, was also a ski jumper.
