= Borghild Niskin =

Norwegian alpine skier (1924–2013)

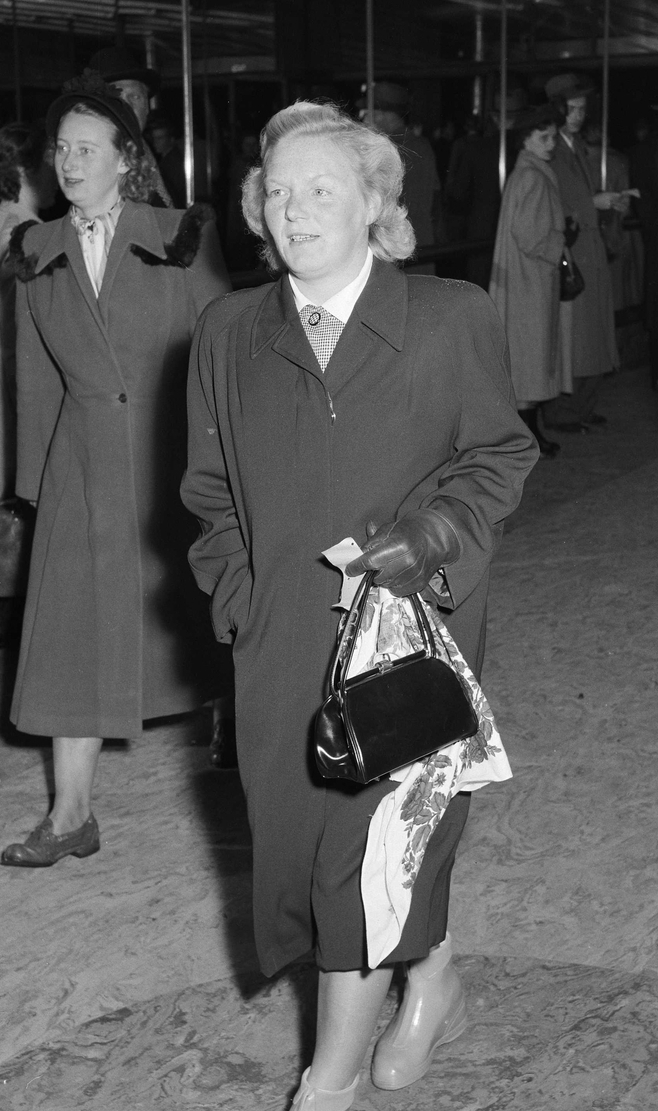
- Borghild Niskin

Personal information
- Born: December 19, 1924
- Died: January 18, 2013 (aged 88)

Sport
- Sport: Alpine skiing

Borghild Niskin (19 February 1924 – 18 January 2013) was a Norwegian alpine skier who finished 7th in the women's giant slalom at the 1956 Winter Olympics at Cortina d'Ampezzo. She became the first woman awarded the Holmenkollen medal that same year. (Shared with fellow Norwegians Arnfinn Bergmann and Arne Hoel.)

She is one of only eleven non-Nordic skiers to win the Holmenkollen medal (Stein Eriksen, King Haakon VII, Inger Bjørnbakken, Astrid Sandvik, King Olav V, Erik Håker, Jacob Vaage, King Harald V, and Queen Sonja. (all from Norway), and Ingemar Stenmark (Sweden) are the others.) She also finished fifth in the alpine combined event at the Alpine World Skiing Championships in 1956.
