= SFK Lyn =

Norwegian sports club

- Full name: Ski- og Fotballklubben Lyn
- Founded: 3 March 1896; 130 years ago
- Ground: Kringsjå kunstgress, Kringsjå, Oslo (football)

Ski- og Fotballklubben Lyn (lit. 'Ski and Football Club Lightning') is a Norwegian alliance sports club from Nordre Aker, Oslo. It has two sections; for association football and Nordic skiing. Until 2010 they had a third section, for top-level association football, named FK Lyn. In the skiing is also embedded orienteering, triathlon, and track and field. Lyn has previously also been playing bandy.

== General history ==
The club was founded as IF Lyn on 3 March 1896. It originated in St. Hanshaugen, and was a club for boys aged 12 to 14. The first sports were association football (the club was a founding member of the Football Association of Norway in 1902), cross-country skiing and ski jumping. Other sports like ice hockey, bandy, orienteering, and tennis were tried but later discontinued. The club colors are red, white and blue.

== FK Lyn ==
FK Lyn was the name of the top-level football section. It consisted of a men's senior team, a B team and a men's junior team. It fielded for many decades as SFK Lyn until top and grassroots football was divided into two. The elite section held the name FC Lyn Oslo for some years. It took over the history, records and achievements of SFK Lyn's football section.

This section went bankrupt in 2010, and the senior, B and junior teams were pulled from competition and their games annulled. The club, represented with the senior team, also took part in the 2010 Norwegian Football Cup, but was eliminated before the bankruptcy.

== Lyn Fotball ==
Lyn Fotball is the "grassroots football" (Norwegian: breddefotball) section of SFK Lyn, comprising the non-professional players within the club. A senior men's team (bearing no relation to FC Lyn Oslo/FK Lyn) was founded because of demand in the district, and currently plays in the Fourth Division, the fifth tier of Norwegian football. The women's team currently plays in the Fourth Division, the fifth tier. The junior men's team plays in the highest league in Oslo, and actually competed against FK Lyn in this league before the latter went defunct.

There have been talks of a Lyn men's team being "resurrected" through the body of Lyn Fotball. In that case the club would have to build itself up from a Sixth Division team, or Fifth Division if the current team is successful in its bid for promotion in 2010. There was also talk of top names signing for Lyn Fotball, such as Erik Mykland, Jan Derek Sørensen and Steven Lustü. In August 2010 Lustü and Jo Tessem signed. On 22 August 2010, Lyn hosted Vinderen SF at Frogner stadion in front of a crowd of more than 2,000, the largest crowd ever recorded for a Norwegian seventh tier match. Tessem scored in a match Lyn were lucky to win 5-2 after a gutsy performance from minnows VSF. Lyn Fotball finished champion by goal average in Third Group of 6th Division and promoted to 5th Division (6th level). Due to former successes, Lyn was admitted to First Group of 4th Division (Fifth Level) in 2011 season. They had a perfect season, winning all their games and won promotion to the 3rd Division for the 2012 season.

== Lyn Ski ==
One of the original sports in Lyn, the club has had many successful skiers. The women's relay team in skiing won national championships in 2000 and 2001, and also team sprint national championships in 2004 and 2005. Team members include Ine Wigernæs, Ella Gjømle and Jannike Østby. Noted skiers from older times include Arnfinn Bergmann, Gunnar Andersen, Alf Steen Andersen, Arne Hoel, Lars Grini, Ivar Formo and Olav V of Norway.

In the skiing section is also embedded orienteering, triathlon and track and field.

The club operated two ski jumping hills in Nordmarka, near the lake Store Åklungen. Construction of the hills was started in 1918. In 1922 the largest hill, Store Lynbakken, was ready, but it only had a size of about 30 metres, rebuilt to 40 metres in 1927. The smaller hill Lille Lynbakken had a size of about 25 metres.
