= Jannike Irene Østby =

Norwegian cross-country skier

Jannike Irene Østby (born 1978) is a retired Norwegian cross-country skier.

She made her World Cup debut in March 2000 at the Holmenkollen ski festival, finishing 45th in the 30 km. She collected her first World Cup points with a 24th place in the December 2002 Davos 10 km, and also competed in World Cup relays. She improved to a 19th place in January 2003 in Nové Město na Moravě, but her last World Cup outing was the 2003–2004 season opener at Beitostølen where she finished a measly 67th. She also competed in the 30 km race at the 2003 World Championships, but did not finish the race.

She represented the sports clubs Rustad IL, SFK Lyn and Bækkelagets SK.
