= Geir Ove Berg =

Norwegian ski jumper

Personal information
- Nationality: Norway
- Born: 13 March 1947 (age 79) Furnes, Norway

Sport
- Sport: Skiing

Achievements and titles
- Personal bests: 173 m (568 ft); Oberstdorf, West Germany (4 March 1976)

Geir Ove Berg (born 13 March 1947) is a Norwegian former ski jumper.

== Career ==
On 4 March 1976, he set at the ski jumping world record distance at 173 metres (568 ft) on Heini-Klopfer-Skiflugschanze in Oberstdorf, West Germany. (Note: Geir Ove Berg's jump was first measured as 167 metres, but later corrected into 173 metres world record. It was officially published the next day)

== Ski jumping world record ==
Date	Hill	Location	Metres	Feet
4 March 1976	Heini-Klopfer-Skiflugschanze K175	Oberstdorf, West Germany	173	568
