= Willi Gantschnigg =

Austrian ski jumper and folk musician

Personal information
- Nationality: Austria
- Born: 1 January 1920 (age 106) Jochberg, Tyrol, First Austrian Republic
- Died: 2 December 1977 (aged 57)

Sport
- Sport: Skiing
- Club: SC St. Johann

Achievements and titles
- Personal bests: 125 m (410 ft); Oberstdorf, West Germany (2 March 1950)

Willi Gantschnigg (1 January 1920 – 2 December 1987) was an Austrian ski jumper and folk musician being a member of Schuhplattler group Edelraute.

== Career ==
He was member of his homeclub SC St. Johann in Tirol. He donated his skis to local history museum Kitzbühel, which was run by his friend Martin Wörgötter.

On 28 February 1950 he set the world record, not clear if 123, 124 or 125 metres (403.6, 407 or 410 ft) at Heini-Klopfer-Skiflugschanze in Oberstdorf, West Germany. Two days later he crashed and seriously injured at the world record distance 130 m (430 ft).

== Ski jumping world records ==
| Date | Hill | Location | Metres | Feet |
|---|---|---|---|---|
| 28 February 1950 | Heini-Klopfer-Skiflugschanze | Oberstdorf, West Germany | 123; 124; 125 | 403.6; 407; 410 |
| 2 March 1950 | Heini-Klopfer-Skiflugschanze | Oberstdorf, West Germany | 130 | 430 |

Not recognized! Crashed and broke his leg at world record distance. (Note: Austrian-German websites cites he set the WR at 124 metres; Slovenian newspaper Slovenski poročevalec (4 March 1950), published WR at 125 metres; Slovenian newspaper Ljudska pravica (4 March 1950) published 123 metres world record.)
