= Arnfinn Bergmann =

Norwegian ski jumper

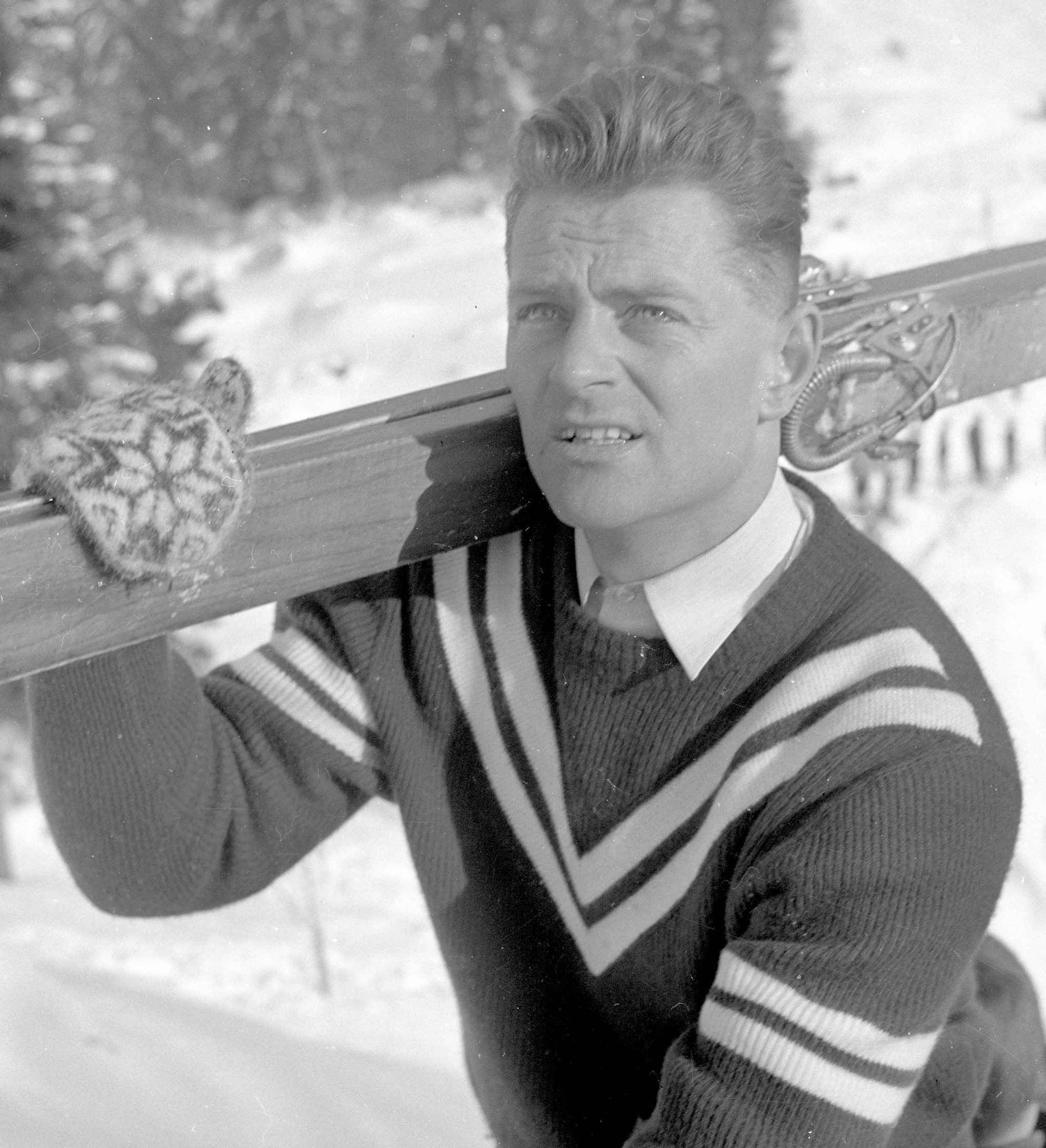

Personal information
- Born: 14 October 1928 Strinda Municipality, Sør-Trøndelag, Norway
- Died: 13 February 2011 (aged 82) Trondheim, Norway

Sport
- Sport: Ski jumping
- Club: SK Freidig (1948–56); SFK Lyn (1956–59)
Medal record
Representing Norway
Olympic Games
Gold medal – first place	1952 Oslo	Individual large hill
World Championships
Gold medal – first place	1952 Oslo	Individual large hill
Bronze medal – third place	1950 Lake Placid	Individual large hill

Arnfinn Bergmann (14 October 1928 – 13 February 2011) was a ski jumper from Norway. He won the individual large hill event at the 1952 Olympics and 1952 Holmenkollen ski festival and placed third at the 1950 World Championships. In 1956 he was awarded the Holmenkollen medal (shared with Borghild Niskin and Arne Hoel).

As a junior Bergmann won the national title and the ski jumping competition in Holmenkollen in 1948. The same year he won the national football title with SK Freidig. Next year he started competing as a senior and placed third at the national championships. In 1950 he was included to the national team and unexpectedly won a bronze medal at the world championships. For the 1950–51 season he stayed in Canada, where he won his every competition. In 1952 he returned to Norway and won the Olympic gold medal, the Holmenkollen and the national championships. He defended his national title in 1953, but was injured in early 1954 and missed the season. He qualified for the 1956 Olympics, but withdrew due to a flu. In 1958 he was included to the 1958 World Championships team, after he unexpectedly won the national title, but he withdrew again, for unknown reasons. He retired in 1959 after placing third at the national championships.

In 1956 Bergmann moved from Trondheim to Oslo, and for the next thirty years worked as a school teacher in Oslo and neighboring Bærum Municipality. After that he returned to Trondheim and spent the rest of his active life maintaining the local ski museum.
