= Sepp Weiler =

German ski jumper (1921–1997)

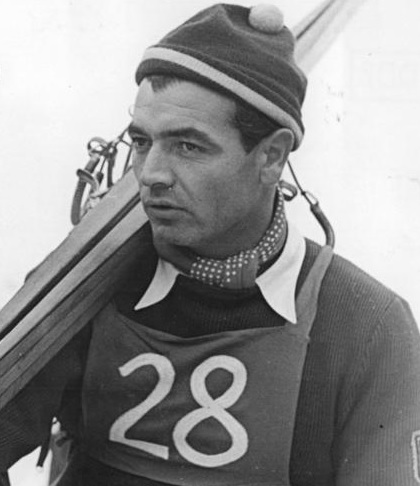
- Sepp Weiler in 1953

Personal information
- Nationality: West Germany
- Born: 22 January 1921 Oberstdorf, Weimar Republic
- Died: 24 May 1997 (aged 76) Kempten, Germany

Sport
- Sport: Skiing
- Club: SC Oberstdorf

Achievements and titles
- Personal bests: 133 m (436 ft); Oberstdorf, West Germany (3 March 1950)

Sepp Weiler (22 January 1921, Oberstdorf, Bavaria – 24 May 1997) was a West German ski jumper who competed from 1952 to 1956.

== Career ==
He finished tied for eighth in the individual large hill event at the 1952 Winter Olympics in Oslo. Weiler's best career finish was fifth in an individual normal hill event in Austria in 1953.

On 2–3 March 1950 he set two world records at 127 metres (417 ft) on Heini-Klopfer-Skiflugschanze ski flying hill in Oberstdorf, West Germany. (Note: According to official German radio report, which was cited and published in Ljudska pravica (4/3/1950), jumps were following in the next order: Andreas Däscher (130 m), then Dan Netzell (135 m) and the last Sepp Weiler (133 m).)

== Ski jumping world records ==
Date	Hill	Location	Metres	Feet
2 March 1950	Heini-Klopfer-Skiflugschanze	Oberstdorf, West Germany	127	417

*Weiler jumped 133 metres after Dan Netzell set world record (Ljudska pravica; 4/3/1950).
