= Tauno Luiro =

Finnish ski jumper

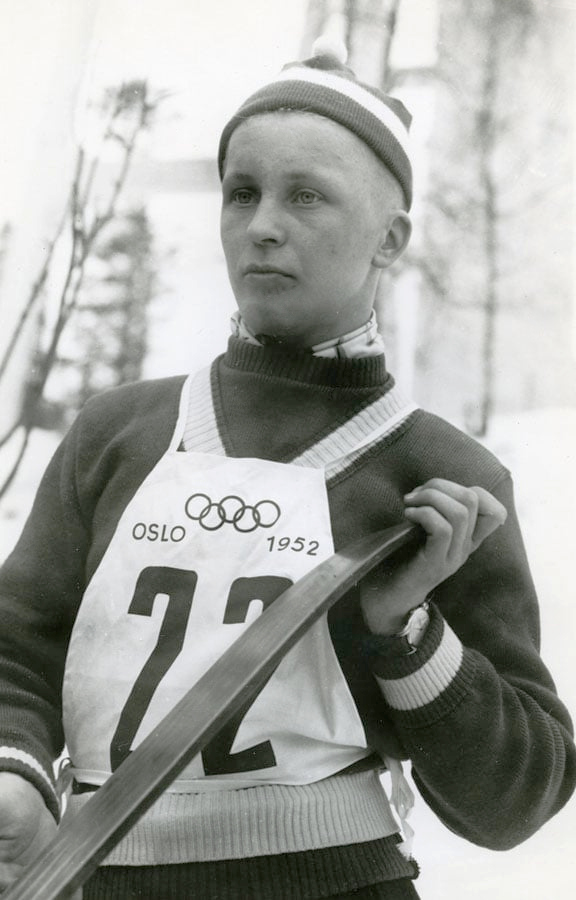
- Luiro at the 1952 Olympics

Personal information
- Nationality: Finland
- Born: 24 February 1932 Rovaniemi, Finland
- Died: 29 October 1955 (aged 23) Rovaniemi, Finland

Sport
- Sport: Skiing
- Club: Ounasvaaran Hiihtoseura

Achievements and titles
- Personal bests: 139 m (456 ft); Oberstdorf, West Germany (2 March 1951)

Tauno Johannes Luiro (24 February 1932 – 29 October 1955) was a Finnish ski jumper.

== Career ==
In February 1951 he became the first non-Norwegian to win the youth ski jumping competition in Holmenkollen, Oslo.

On 2 March 1951 he set a new world record at 139 metres (456 ft) on Heini-Klopfer-Skiflugschanze in Oberstdorf, West Germany, which remained unbeaten until 1961.

He competed in the individual large hill event at the 1952 Winter Olympics and tied for 18th place.

Luiro suffered from diabetes, and died of lung tuberculosis in 1955, aged 23. His younger brother Erkki Luiro was an Olympic Nordic combined competitor, while his nephew Tauno Käyhkö became an Olympic ski jumper.

== Ski jumping world record ==
Date	Hill	Location	Metres	Feet
2 March 1951	Heini-Klopfer-Skiflugschanze	Oberstdorf, West Germany	139	456
