= Dan Netzell =

Swedish ski jumper

Personal information
- Nationality: Sweden
- Born: 1 April 1913 Stockholm, Sweden
- Died: 11 November 2003 (aged 90) Stockholm, Sweden

Sport
- Sport: Skiing
- Club: Djurgårdens IF

Achievements and titles
- Personal bests: 135 m (443 ft); Oberstdorf, West Germany (3 March 1950)

Dan Netzell (4 January 1913 – 11 November 2003) was a Swedish ski jumper and a world record holder for one year.

== Ski jumping world record ==
Date	Hill	Location	Metres	Feet
3 March 1950	Heini-Klopfer-Skiflugschanze	Oberstdorf, West Germany	135	443
