= Torbjørn Falkanger =

Norwegian ski jumper

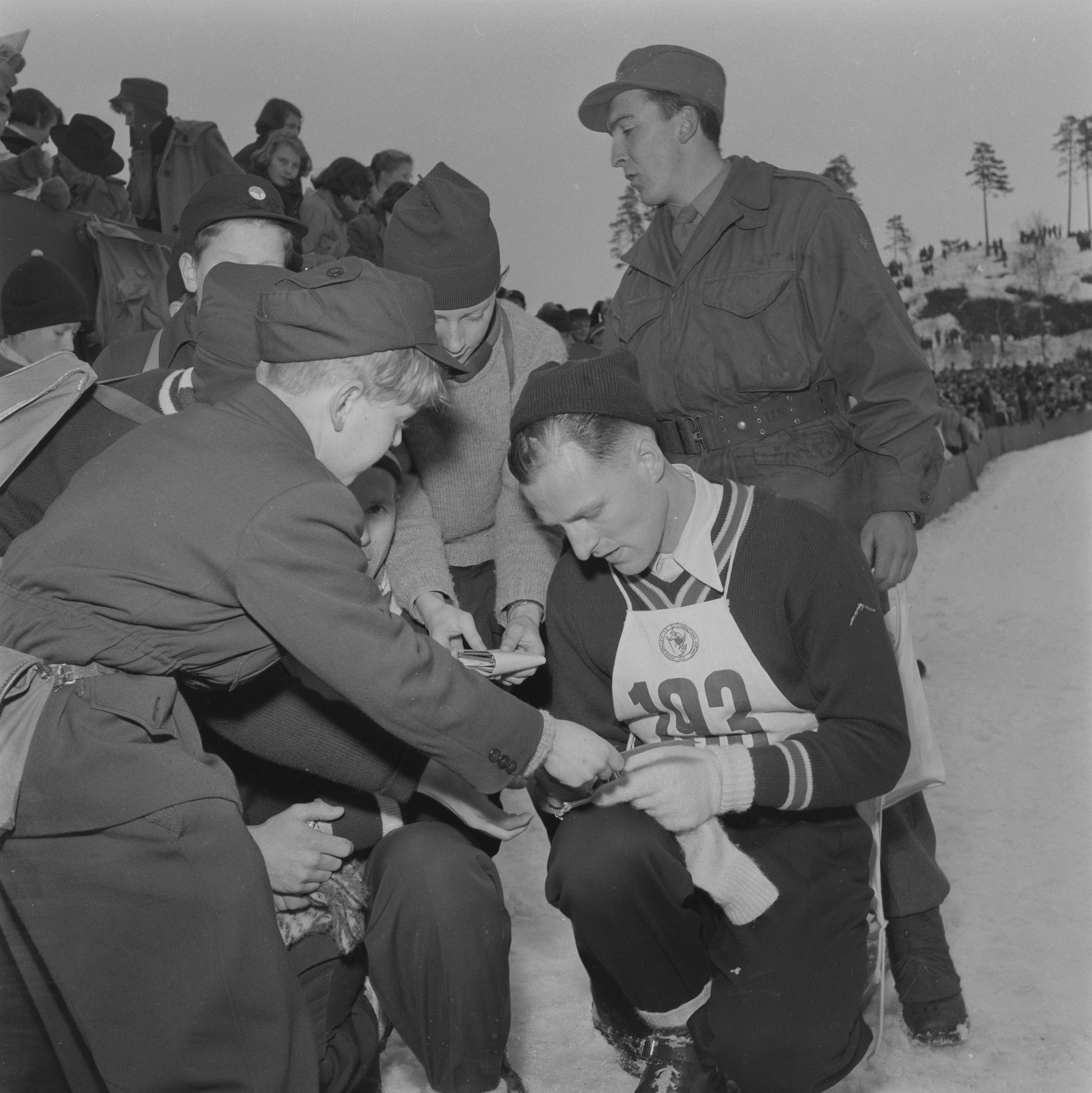

Medal record

Men's ski jumping

Representing Norway

Olympic Games
Silver medal – second place	1952 Oslo	Individual large hill

World Championships
Silver medal – second place	1952 Oslo	Individual large hill

Torbjørn Falkanger (8 October 1927 in Trondheim – 16 July 2013) was a Norwegian ski jumper who was active in the late 1940s and early 1950s.

Falkanger earned a silver medal at the 1952 Winter Olympics in ski jumping and also won the Holmenkollen ski festival ski jumping competition twice (1949 and 1950). For his ski jumping efforts, Falkanger was awarded the Holmenkollen medal in 1952 (Shared with Stein Eriksen, Heikki Hasu and Nils Karlsson.)

Falkanger also took the Olympic Oath at the 1952 games in Oslo.

His career ended a few months ahead of the 1956 Winter Olympics, due to a fall in the ski jumping hill.
