= Gjert Andersen =

Norwegian skier

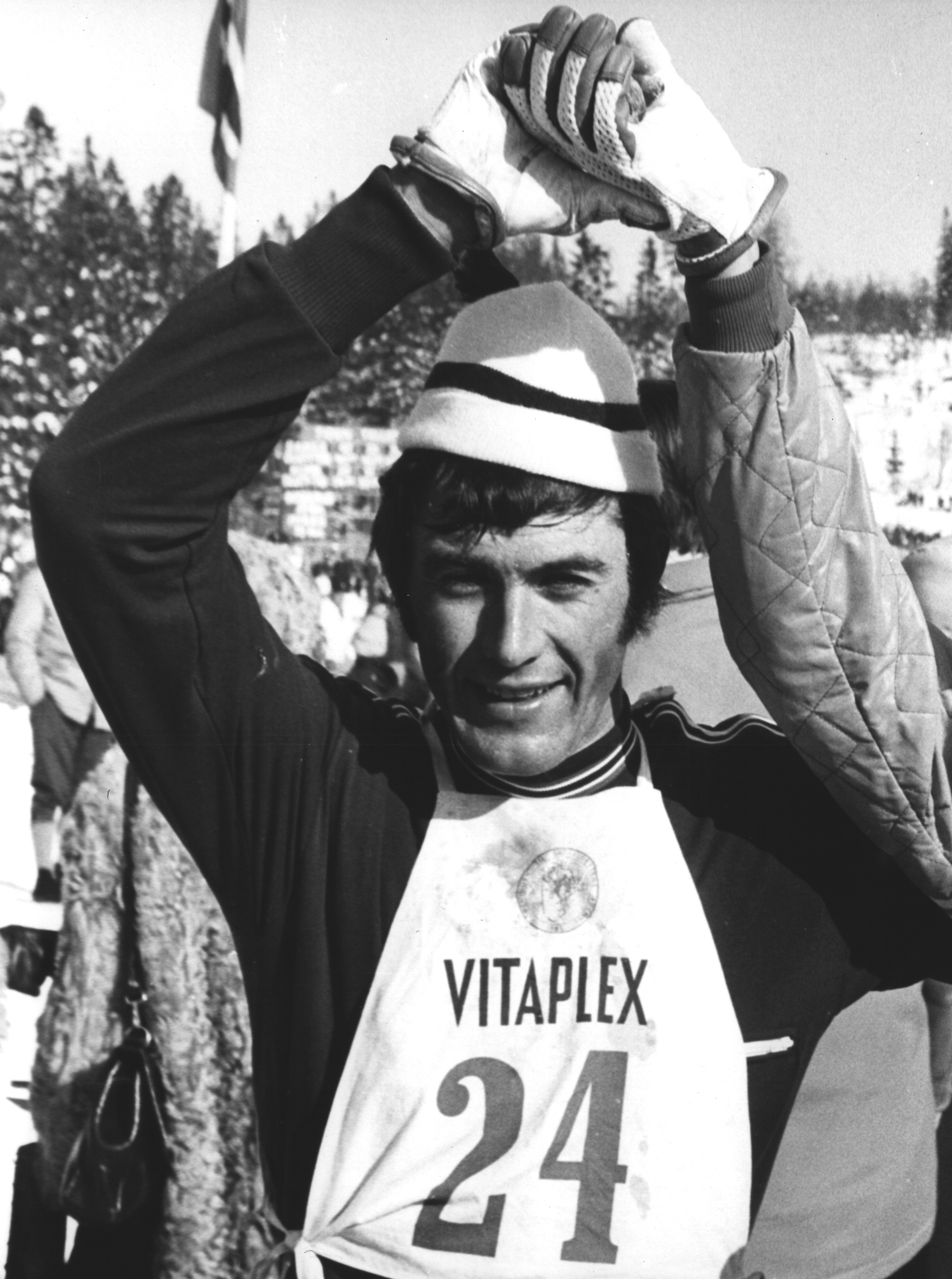

Personal information
- Nationality: Norwegian
- Born: 17 March 1947 (age 78); Bærum

Sport
- Sport: Skiing
- Event: Nordic combined
- Club: Stabæk IF

Gjert Andersen (born 17 March 1947) is a Norwegian skier.

== Biography ==
Andersen was born in Bærum and represented the club Stabæk IF. He competed in Nordic combined at the 1968 Winter Olympics in Grenoble, and at the 1972 Winter Olympics in Sapporo.
