= Erling Kroken =

Norwegian ski jumper (1928–2007)

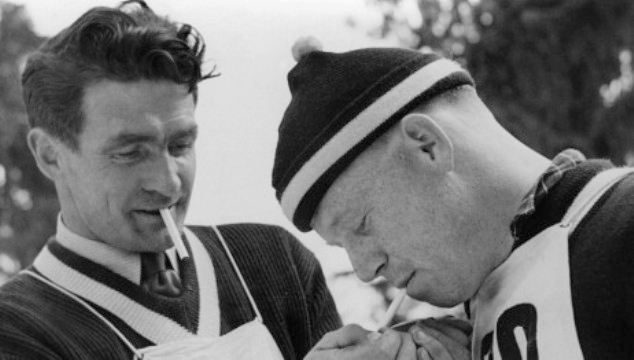
Simon Slåttvik and Erling Kroken (right) at the Holmenkollen ski festival in 1952.

Erling Kroken (12 November 1928 – 5 October 2007) was a Norwegian ski jumper who competed in the early 1950s. He won the first Four Hills Tournament event at Oberstdorf in 1953. Kroken was born on 12 November 1928, and died in 2007.
