= Rena IL =

Norwegian sports club

- Full name: Rena Idrettslag
- Founded: 1892
- Ground: Rena leir Rena
- League: 4. Divisjon
Home colours

Rena Idrettslag is a Norwegian sports club from Rena, founded in 1906. It has sections for association football, gymnastics, athletics, orienteering, swimming, triathlon, tennis, cheerleading, cycling, biathlon, and Nordic skiing.

The club has a ski jumping hill named Renabakken. The hill records are held by Lars Bystøl (large hill), Anders Bardal (normal hill, men) and Anette Sagen (normal hill, women). In skiing, the club is also known for arranging Birkebeinerrennet together with Lillehammer SK.

The men's football team plays in the 4. Divisjon. The team played one season in the 3. Divisjon, in 1994.

The club has had one national medalist in athletics. Mette E. Storholm took bronze medals in the standing long jump in 1979 and 1981.
