= Karl Holmström =

Swedish ski jumper

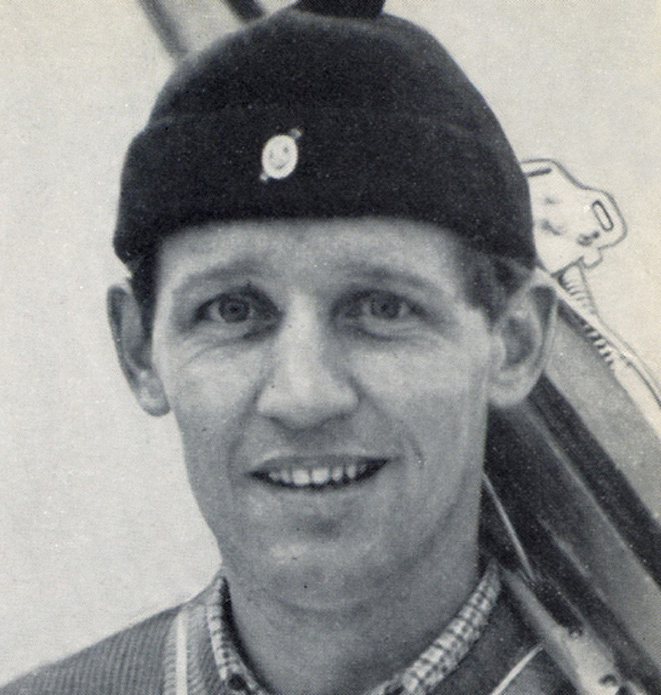

Personal information
- Born: 21 March 1925 Bjurholm, Sweden
- Died: 22 June 1974 (aged 49) Jukkasjärvi, Sweden

Sport
- Sport: Ski jumping
- Club: IFK Kiruna
Medal record
Representing Sweden
Olympic Games
Bronze medal – third place	1952 Oslo	Individual large hill
World Championships
Bronze medal – third place	1952 Oslo	Individual large hill

Karl "Bratt-Kalle" Holmström (21 March 1925 – 22 June 1974) was a Swedish ski jumper who won a bronze medal in the individual large hill at the 1952 Winter Olympics in Oslo. He died in a road accident aged 49.
