= Franz Dengg =

German ski jumper (1928–2024)

Franz Dengg (1 December 1928 – 7 October 2024) was a West German ski jumper who competed from 1952 to 1956. He was born in Partenkirchen. He finished 31st in the individual large hill event at the 1952 Winter Olympics in Oslo. Dengg's best career finish was seventh twice, both in West Germany (1953, 1955). Dengg died on 7 October 2024, at the age of 95.
