= Arne Hoel =

Norwegian ski jumper

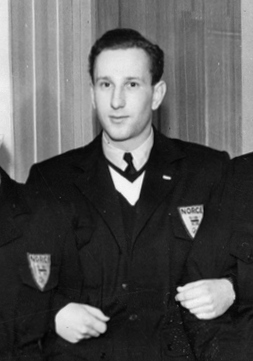
- Hoel as a reserve at the 1948 Winter Olympics.

Personal information
- Born: 5 April 1927 Skoger, Norway
- Died: 10 September 2006 (aged 79) Nordstrand, Norway

Sport
- Sport: Ski jumping
- Club: SFK Lyn; IL Varg

Arne Hoel (5 April 1927 – 10 September 2006) was a Norwegian ski jumper who competed in the 1940s and 1950s. He won the ski jumping event at the Holmenkollen ski festival three times (1948, 1951 and 1959). Because of his successes, Hoel was awarded the Holmenkollen medal in 1956 (shared with Borghild Niskin and Arnfinn Bergmann). He also finished sixth and eleventh in the individual large hill event at the 1952 and 1956 Winter Olympics, respectively.
