= Fritz Schneider (ski jumper) =

Swiss ski jumper

Fritz Schneider (born 2 September 1928) was a Swiss ski jumper who competed during the 1950s. He finished 26th in the individual large hill event at the 1952 Winter Olympics in Oslo. Schneider's best career finish was tenth place in an individual normal hill event in Austria in 1953.
