= Halvor Næs =

Norwegian former ski jumper (1928–2022)

Halvor Næs (19 April 1928 – 13 October 2022) was a Norwegian ski jumper who competed in the 1950s. His only victory was in 1953 and he finished fifth in the individual large hill event at the 1952 Winter Olympics in Oslo. He was born in Trysil Municipality. Næs was awarded the Holmenkollen medal in 1964 (shared with Veikko Kankkonen, Eero Mäntyranta, and Georg Thoma). Næs died in Trysil on 13 October 2022, at the age of 94.

== Sources ==
- Halvor Naes at the International Ski and Snowboard Federation
- Holmenkollen medalists - click Holmenkollmedaljen for downloadable pdf file (in Norwegian)
- Halvor Næs at Olympics at Sports-Reference.com (archived)
