= 2024–25 Four Hills Tournament =

Ski jumping competition

Four Hills Tournament at the 2024–25 FIS Ski Jumping World Cup
- Venue: Schattenbergschanze, Große Olympiaschanze, Bergiselschanze, Paul-Ausserleitner-Schanze
- Location: Austria, Germany
- Dates: 29 December 2024 – 6 January 2025

Medalists
gold medal	(Austria) Daniel Tschofenig
silver medal	(Austria) Jan Hörl
bronze medal	(Austria) Stefan Kraft

The 2024–25 Four Hills Tournament took place at the four traditional venues of Oberstdorf, Garmisch-Partenkirchen, Innsbruck, and Bischofshofen, located in Germany and Austria, between 29 December 2024 and 6 January 2025.

By winning the overall tournament title, Daniel Tschofenig ended the ten-year Austrian title drought in this competition. Before him, the last ski jumper from Austria with the overall title had been Stefan Kraft in the 2014–15 competition. This was also only the third time in history that three ski jumpers from Austria secured a podium sweep in the final overall standings, after competitions in 1974–75 and 2011–12.

In the overall standings, the final margin between the top two competitors was only 1.4 points – the smallest margin since the 2005–06 competition, while the margin between the top three competitors was only 4.1 pts – the smallest margin since the 1988–89 tournament.

== Results ==
=== Oberstdorf ===
HS137 Schattenbergschanze, Germany
29 December 2024

Rank	Name	Nationality	Jump 1 (m)	Round 1 (pts)	Jump 2 (m)	Round 2 (pts)	Total Points
1	Stefan Kraft	Austria	138.0	167.2	135.5	167.9	335.1
2	Jan Hörl	Austria	134.5	165.9	135.0	165.7	331.6
3	Daniel Tschofenig	Austria	131.0	155.6	140.5	168.0	323.6
4	Pius Paschke	Germany	138.0	162.7	133.5	158.6	321.3
5	Johann André Forfang	Norway	140.0	160.5	136.0	158.4	318.9
6	Gregor Deschwanden	Switzerland	140.0	156.4	136.5	162.2	318.6
7	Kristoffer Eriksen Sundal	Norway	134.0	151.5	135.5	151.4	302.9
8	Karl Geiger	Germany	135.0	142.8	137.0	157.2	300.0
8	Michael Hayböck	Austria	134.5	156.5	129.5	143.5	300.0
10	Paweł Wąsek	Poland	137.0	149.8	130.0	148.0	297.8

=== Garmisch-Partenkirchen ===
HS142 Große Olympiaschanze, Germany
1 January 2025

Rank	Name	Nationality	Jump 1 (m)	Round 1 (pts)	Jump 2 (m)	Round 2 (pts)	Total Points
1	Daniel Tschofenig	Austria	141.5	151.6	143.0	147.3	298.9
2	Gregor Deschwanden	Switzerland	138.0	145.1	140.5	145.2	290.3
3	Michael Hayböck	Austria	145.0	149.3	137.5	139.7	289.0
4	Anže Lanišek	Slovenia	139.5	140.6	140.5	147.7	288.3
5	Jan Hörl	Austria	134.0	134.1	142.5	148.9	283.0
6	Karl Geiger	Germany	137.0	139.8	138.5	142.9	282.7
7	Johann André Forfang	Norway	136.5	138.3	137.5	142.8	281.1
8	Stefan Kraft	Austria	131.5	131.1	140.5	147.6	278.7
9	Pius Paschke	Germany	129.0	130.8	143.5	145.1	275.9
10	Andreas Wellinger	Germany	126.5	133.2	134.0	140.8	274.0

=== Innsbruck ===
HS128 Bergiselschanze, Austria
4 January 2025

Rank	Name	Nationality	Jump 1 (m)	Round 1 (pts)	Jump 2 (m)	Round 2 (pts)	Total Points
1	Stefan Kraft	Austria	131.5	135.0	132.5	138.3	273.3
2	Jan Hörl	Austria	134.0	135.5	132.0	136.4	271.9
3	Daniel Tschofenig	Austria	132.5	134.6	127.5	128.7	263.3
4	Gregor Deschwanden	Switzerland	126.0	123.7	129.0	130.7	254.4
5	Paweł Wąsek	Poland	129.0	124.7	129.5	129.1	253.8
6	Johann André Forfang	Norway	130.5	130.9	122.0	121.6	252.5
7	Maximilian Ortner	Austria	128.5	126.3	125.5	124.8	251.1
8	Pius Paschke	Germany	128.5	126.6	123.5	123.7	250.3
9	Domen Prevc	Slovenia	129.0	126.7	123.5	119.1	245.8
10	Anže Lanišek	Slovenia	127.5	122.8	125.0	121.8	244.6

=== Bischofshofen ===
HS142 Paul-Ausserleitner-Schanze, Austria
6 January 2025

Rank	Name	Nationality	Jump 1 (m)	Round 1 (pts)	Jump 2 (m)	Round 2 (pts)	Total Points
1	Daniel Tschofenig	Austria	136.0	149.6	140.5	159.0	308.6
2	Jan Hörl	Austria	140.5	152.7	143.0	153.8	306.5
3	Stefan Kraft	Austria	136.0	154.8	137.5	148.4	303.2
4	Johann André Forfang	Norway	139.5	152.2	139.5	149.5	301.7
5	Maximilian Ortner	Austria	134.0	153.4	137.5	146.6	300.0
6	Benjamin Østvold	Norway	137.5	147.9	139.0	150.3	298.2
7	Michael Hayböck	Austria	138.0	147.8	140.0	149.1	296.9
8	Paweł Wąsek	Poland	137.5	145.9	139.0	148.2	294.1
9	Andreas Wellinger	Germany	133.0	140.8	135.5	150.1	290.9
10	Ren Nikaido	Japan	135.5	139.1	136.5	150.8	289.9

== Overall standings ==
The final standings after all four events:

Rank	Name	Nationality	Oberstdorf	Garmisch- Partenkirchen	Innsbruck	Bischofshofen	Total Points
1st place, gold medalist(s)	Daniel Tschofenig	Austria	323.6 (3)	298.9 (1)	263.3 (3)	308.6 (1)	1,194.4
2nd place, silver medalist(s)	Jan Hörl	Austria	331.6 (2)	283.0 (5)	271.9 (2)	306.5 (2)	1,193.0
3rd place, bronze medalist(s)	Stefan Kraft	Austria	335.1 (1)	278.7 (8)	273.3 (1)	303.2 (3)	1,190.3
4	Johann André Forfang	Norway	318.9 (5)	281.1 (7)	252.5 (6)	301.7 (4)	1,154.2
5	Gregor Deschwanden	Switzerland	318.6 (6)	290.3 (2)	254.4 (4)	288.6 (11)	1,151.9
6	Pius Paschke	Germany	321.3 (4)	275.9 (9)	250.3 (8)	286.5 (12)	1,134.0
7	Michael Hayböck	Austria	300.0 (8)	289.0 (3)	242.7 (12)	296.9 (7)	1,128.6
8	Paweł Wąsek	Poland	297.8 (10)	263.6 (16)	253.8 (5)	294.1 (8)	1,109.3
9	Maximilian Ortner	Austria	293.3 (11)	262.9 (17)	251.1 (7)	300.0 (5)	1,107.3
10	Anže Lanišek	Slovenia	291.0 (15)	288.3 (4)	244.6 (10)	275.1 (18)	1,099.0
