= 2008–09 Four Hills Tournament =

Ski jumping competition

The 2008–09 Four Hills Tournament was held at the four traditional venues of Oberstdorf, Garmisch-Partenkirchen, Innsbruck and Bischofshofen, located in Germany and Austria.

The tournament was won by Austria's Wolfgang Loitzl, who previously had not won a single World Cup event in his career. Loitzl won the last three competitions at Garmisch-Partenkirchen, Innsbruck and Bischofshofen to claim the overall victory, and became the first Austrian to win the Four Hills since Andreas Widhölzl in 1999–2000. The opening event at Oberstdorf was won by Switzerland' s Simon Ammann, the overall World Cup leader at the time of the competition. Ammann also finished second overall in the Four Hills. Austria's Gregor Schlierenzauer finished third overall, while Martin Schmitt of Germany and Dimitry Vassiliev of Russia rounded out the top five.

== Overall standings ==
Rank	Name	Nationality	Total points	Oberstdorf (Rk)	Garmisch (Rk)	Innsbruck (Rk)	Bis'hofen (Rk)
1	Wolfgang Loitzl	Austria	1123.7	285.2 (2)	276.3 (1)	261.0 (1)	301.2 (1)
2	Simon Ammann	Switzerland	1091.1	286.4 (1)	274.6 (2)	245.7 (8)	284.4 (2)
3	Gregor Schlierenzauer	Austria	1077.1	280.1 (4)	257.6 (4)	260.3 (2)	279.1 (4)
4	Martin Schmitt	Germany	1055.2	273.8 (5)	245.2 (8)	257.7 (3)	278.5 (5)
5	Dimitry Vassiliev	Russia	1048.1	284.4 (3)	239.6 (9)	244.9 (9)	279.2 (3)
6	Anders Jacobsen	Norway	1027.9	269.0 (6)	247.0 (7)	244.4 (10)	267.5 (7)
7	Harri Olli	Finland	1019.2	268.5 (7)	258.6 (3)	239.6 (11)	252.5 (10)
8	Thomas Morgenstern	Austria	1001.0	254.7 (11)	248.5 (6)	250.6 (5)	247.2 (16)
9	Matti Hautamäki	Finland	991.4	250.5 (13)	237.1 (10)	253.2 (4)	250.6 (12)
10	Michael Neumayer	Germany	986.3	259.8 (9)	211.2 (24)	246.5 (7)	268.8 (6)

== Oberstdorf ==
HS137 Schattenbergschanze, Germany
29 December 2008

Rank	Name	Nationality	1st (m)	2nd (m)	Points	Overall FHT points	Overall WC points (Rank)
1	Simon Ammann	Switzerland	136.5	134.0	286.4	286.4 (1)	685 (1)
2	Wolfgang Loitzl	Austria	135.0	134.0	285.2	285.2 (2)	439 (3)
3	Dimitry Vassiliev	Russia	134.5	136.0	284.4	284.4 (3)	185 (9)
4	Gregor Schlierenzauer	Austria	133.0	134.0	280.1	280.1 (4)	560 (2)
5	Martin Schmitt	Germany	134.5	129.0	273.8	273.8 (5)	248 (6)

== Garmisch-Partenkirchen ==
HS140 Große Olympiaschanze, Germany
1 January 2009

Rank	Name	Nationality	1st (m)	2nd (m)	Points	Overall FHT points	Overall WC points (Rank)
1	Wolfgang Loitzl	Austria	134.5	136.5	276.3	561.5 (1)	539 (3)
2	Simon Ammann	Switzerland	140.0	134.5	274.6	561.0 (2)	765 (1)
3	Harri Olli	Finland	133.0	131.5	258.6	527.1 (4)	284 (6)
4	Gregor Schlierenzauer	Austria	134.0	130.5	257.6	537.7 (3)	610 (2)
5	Martin Koch	Austria	134.5	128.0	249.0	482.5 (11)	230 (8)

== Innsbruck ==
HS130 Bergiselschanze, Austria
4 January 2009

Rank	Name	Nationality	1st (m)	2nd (m)	Points	Overall FHT points	Overall WC points (Rank)
1	Wolfgang Loitzl	Austria	126.5	128.5	261.0	822.5 (1)	639 (3)
2	Gregor Schlierenzauer	Austria	126.0	127.5	260.3	798.0 (3)	690 (2)
3	Martin Schmitt	Germany	128.5	125.5	257.7	776.7 (4)	340 (5)
4	Matti Hautamäki	Finland	123.5	128.0	253.2	740.8 (9)	241 (10)
5	Thomas Morgenstern	Austria	124.5	125.0	250.6	753.8 (8)	359 (4)

== Bischofshofen ==
HS140 Paul-Ausserleitner-Schanze, Austria
6 January 2009

Rank	Name	Nationality	1st (m)	2nd (m)	Points	Overall FHT points	Overall WC points (Rank)
1	Wolfgang Loitzl	Austria	142.5	141.5	301.2	1123.7 (1)	739 (3)
2	Simon Ammann	Switzerland	137.5	140.5	284.4	1091.1 (2)	877 (1)
3	Dimitry Vassiliev	Russia	138.0	138.5	279.2	1048.1 (5)	303 (8)
4	Gregor Schlierenzauer	Austria	138.5	136.0	279.1	1077.1 (3)	740 (2)
5	Martin Schmitt	Germany	138.5	136.5	278.5	1055.2 (4)	385 (4)

== See also ==
- 2008–09 Ski Jumping World Cup
