= 2023–24 Four Hills Tournament =

Ski jumping competition

Four Hills Tournament at the 2023–24 FIS Ski Jumping World Cup
- Venue: Schattenbergschanze, Große Olympiaschanze, Bergiselschanze, Paul-Ausserleitner-Schanze
- Location: Austria, Germany
- Dates: 29 December 2023 – 6 January 2024

Medalists
gold medal	(Japan) Ryōyū Kobayashi
silver medal	(Germany) Andreas Wellinger
bronze medal	(Austria) Stefan Kraft

The 2023–24 Four Hills Tournament took place at the four traditional venues of Oberstdorf, Garmisch-Partenkirchen, Innsbruck, and Bischofshofen, located in Germany and Austria, between 29 December 2023 and 6 January 2024.

Ryōyū Kobayashi of Japan became the first ski jumper since Janne Ahonen of Finland in the 1998–99 competition to win the overall title without having won at any of the four events.

== Results ==
=== Oberstdorf ===
HS137 Schattenbergschanze, Germany
29 December 2023

Rank	Name	Nationality	Jump 1 (m)	Round 1 (pts)	Jump 2 (m)	Round 2 (pts)	Total Points
1	Andreas Wellinger	Germany	139.5	161.3	128.0	148.0	309.3
2	Ryōyū Kobayashi	Japan	134.5	156.5	129.0	149.8	306.3
3	Stefan Kraft	Austria	132.5	155.7	125.0	143.2	298.9
4	Lovro Kos	Slovenia	123.0	135.6	139.5	154.1	289.7
5	Marius Lindvik	Norway	132.0	143.2	127.0	142.9	286.1
6	Philipp Raimund	Germany	128.5	137.6	135.0	148.4	286.0
7	Karl Geiger	Germany	133.5	148.7	122.5	136.7	285.4
8	Jan Hörl	Austria	123.5	138.9	127.5	146.2	285.1
9	Peter Prevc	Slovenia	124.5	128.1	138.0	153.9	282.0
10	Michael Hayböck	Austria	131.5	143.7	129.0	137.7	281.4

=== Garmisch-Partenkirchen ===
HS142 Große Olympiaschanze, Germany
1 January 2024

Rank	Name	Nationality	Jump 1 (m)	Round 1 (pts)	Jump 2 (m)	Round 2 (pts)	Total Points
1	Anže Lanišek	Slovenia	136.0	144.6	137.0	151.2	295.8
2	Ryōyū Kobayashi	Japan	137.0	146.4	135.5	146.2	292.6
3	Andreas Wellinger	Germany	138.0	144.3	137.5	147.1	291.4
4	Manuel Fettner	Austria	136.0	142.0	138.0	146.7	288.7
5	Jan Hörl	Austria	140.0	146.3	128.5	135.1	281.4
6	Stefan Kraft	Austria	133.5	141.4	132.0	135.2	276.6
7	Marius Lindvik	Norway	133.5	136.2	133.0	139.3	275.5
8	Michael Hayböck	Austria	136.0	135.3	141.0	138.3	273.6
9	Peter Prevc	Slovenia	127.5	132.4	133.5	140.2	272.6
10	Pius Paschke	Germany	135.5	135.5	135.5	136.5	272.0

=== Innsbruck ===
HS128 Bergiselschanze, Austria
3 January 2024

Rank	Name	Nationality	Jump 1 (m)	Round 1 (pts)	Jump 2 (m)	Round 2 (pts)	Total Points
1	Jan Hörl	Austria	134.0	139.7	127.5	127.8	267.5
2	Ryōyū Kobayashi	Japan	128.5	129.8	132.0	128.9	258.7
3	Michael Hayböck	Austria	131.0	127.1	135.5	126.9	254.0
4	Lovro Kos	Slovenia	135.0	129.8	129.5	123.4	253.2
5	Andreas Wellinger	Germany	132.0	127.3	126.5	124.8	252.1
6	Stefan Kraft	Austria	123.0	119.9	131.0	128.4	248.3
7	Anže Lanišek	Slovenia	124.5	125.7	130.0	119.1	244.8
8	Daniel Tschofenig	Austria	126.0	117.2	127.5	127.2	244.4
9	Clemens Aigner	Austria	127.5	118.9	130.5	123.5	242.4
10	Timi Zajc	Slovenia	123.5	119.0	125.5	116.7	235.7

=== Bischofshofen ===
HS142 Paul-Ausserleitner-Schanze, Austria
6 January 2024

Rank	Name	Nationality	Jump 1 (m)	Round 1 (pts)	Jump 2 (m)	Round 2 (pts)	Total Points
1	Stefan Kraft	Austria	136.5	142.9	140.0	146.0	288.9
2	Ryōyū Kobayashi	Japan	137.0	144.1	139.0	143.5	287.6
3	Anže Lanišek	Slovenia	134.5	136.0	141.0	145.8	281.8
4	Manuel Fettner	Austria	134.5	134.8	135.0	136.6	271.4
5	Andreas Wellinger	Germany	132.0	129.9	137.0	138.0	267.9
6	Clemens Aigner	Austria	133.5	133.7	131.0	132.8	266.5
7	Halvor Egner Granerud	Norway	132.0	133.1	133.0	132.3	265.4
8	Pius Paschke	Germany	129.0	125.3	133.5	137.0	262.3
9	Peter Prevc	Slovenia	131.0	129.7	135.0	132.1	261.8
10	Jan Hörl	Austria	126.5	115.5	137.5	144.0	259.5

== Overall standings ==
The final standings after all four events:

Rank	Name	Nationality	Oberstdorf	Garmisch- Partenkirchen	Innsbruck	Bischofshofen	Total Points
1st place, gold medalist(s)	Ryōyū Kobayashi	Japan	306.3 (2)	292.6 (2)	258.7 (2)	287.6 (2)	1,145.2
2nd place, silver medalist(s)	Andreas Wellinger	Germany	309.3 (1)	291.4 (3)	252.1 (5)	267.9 (5)	1,120.7
3rd place, bronze medalist(s)	Stefan Kraft	Austria	298.9 (3)	276.6 (6)	248.3 (6)	288.9 (1)	1,112.7
4	Jan Hörl	Austria	285.1 (8)	281.4 (5)	267.5 (1)	259.5 (10)	1,093.5
5	Anže Lanišek	Slovenia	266.7 (18)	295.8 (1)	244.8 (7)	281.8 (3)	1,089.1
6	Michael Hayböck	Austria	281.4 (10)	273.6 (8)	254.0 (3)	257.9 (11)	1,066.9
7	Lovro Kos	Slovenia	289.7 (4)	262.2 (15)	253.2 (4)	238.7 (26)	1,043.8
8	Clemens Aigner	Austria	266.0 (19)	267.5 (12)	242.4 (9)	266.5 (6)	1,042.4
9	Marius Lindvik	Norway	286.1 (5)	275.5 (7)	228.4 (15)	239.4 (24)	1,029.4
10	Timi Zajc	Slovenia	278.4 (14)	269.5 (11)	235.7 (10)	242.4 (22)	1,026.0
