= 1983–84 Four Hills Tournament =

Ski jumping competition

The 1983-84 Four Hills Tournament took place at the four traditional venues of Oberstdorf, Garmisch-Partenkirchen, Innsbruck and Bischofshofen, located in Germany and Austria, between 30 December 1983 and 6 January 1984.

== Results ==
Date	Place	Hill	Size	Winner	Second	Third	Ref.
30 Dec 1983	(West Germany) Oberstdorf	Schattenbergschanze K-115	LH	(East Germany) Klaus Ostwald	(East Germany) Jens Weißflog	(Norway) Ole Gunnar Fidjestøl	
1 Jan 1984	(West Germany) Garmisch-Partenkirchen	Große Olympiaschanze K-107	LH	(East Germany) Jens Weißflog	(Switzerland) Hansjörg Sumi	(East Germany) Klaus Ostwald	
4 Jan 1984	(Austria) Innsbruck	Bergiselschanze K-106	LH	(East Germany) Jens Weißflog	(Finland) Matti Nykänen	(Finland) Jari Puikkonen	
6 Jan 1984	(Austria) Bischofshofen	Paul-Ausserleitner-Schanze K-111	LH	(East Germany) Jens Weißflog	(Norway) Per Bergerud	(Socialist Federal Republic of Yugoslavia) Primož Ulaga	

== Overall ==
Pos	Ski Jumper	Points
1	(East Germany) Jens Weißflog	897.9
2	(East Germany) Klaus Ostwald	842.3
3	(Finland) Matti Nykänen	825.9
4	(Finland) Jari Puikkonen	791.9
5	(Norway) Ole Gunnar Fidjestøl	790.5
6	(Norway) Per Bergerud	789.9
7	(Czechoslovakia) Pavel Ploc	785.3
8	(Finland) Pentti Kokkonen	768.2
9	(United States) Jeff Hastings	761.3
10	(Austria) Andreas Felder	755.8
