= 2018–19 Four Hills Tournament =

Ski jumping competition

Four Hills Tournament at the 2018–19 FIS Ski Jumping World Cup
- Venue: Schattenbergschanze, Große Olympiaschanze, Bergiselschanze, Paul-Ausserleitner-Schanze
- Location: Austria, Germany
- Dates: 30 December 2018 – 6 January 2019

Medalists
| gold medal | (Japan) Ryoyu Kobayashi |
| silver medal | (Germany) Markus Eisenbichler |
| bronze medal | (Germany) Stephan Leyhe |

The 2018–19 Four Hills Tournament took place at the four traditional venues of Oberstdorf, Garmisch-Partenkirchen, Innsbruck, and Bischofshofen, located in Germany and Austria, between 30 December 2018 and 6 January 2019.

Ryoyu Kobayashi became the second ski jumper from Japan to win the overall tournament title, following Kazuyoshi Funaki in 1997–98. Kobayashi also became the third ski jumper in history to win all four events, after Sven Hannawald in 2001–02 and Kamil Stoch in 2017–18.

== Results ==
=== Oberstdorf ===
HS 137 Schattenbergschanze, Germany
30 December 2018

| Rank | Name | Nationality | Jump 1 (m) | Round 1 (pts) | Jump 2 (m) | Round 2 (pts) | Total Points |
|---|---|---|---|---|---|---|---|
| 1 | Ryoyu Kobayashi | Japan | 138.5 | 147.2 | 126.5 | 135.1 | 282.3 |
| 2 | Markus Eisenbichler | Germany | 133.0 | 144.5 | 129.0 | 137.4 | 281.9 |
| 3 | Stefan Kraft | Austria | 131.0 | 134.8 | 134.5 | 145.7 | 280.5 |
| 4 | Andreas Stjernen | Norway | 132.5 | 140.6 | 131.0 | 137.6 | 278.2 |
| 5 | Dawid Kubacki | Poland | 128.5 | 132.3 | 133.5 | 137.5 | 269.8 |
| 6 | Piotr Żyła | Poland | 133.0 | 139.3 | 126.5 | 129.0 | 268.3 |
| 7 | Robert Johansson | Norway | 129.0 | 139.1 | 125.0 | 128.9 | 268.0 |
| 8 | Kamil Stoch | Poland | 127.0 | 134.7 | 131.0 | 132.9 | 267.6 |
| 9 | Timi Zajc | Slovenia | 127.0 | 137.1 | 125.5 | 128.9 | 266.0 |
| 10 | Daniel Huber | Austria | 129.0 | 138.4 | 124.0 | 126.8 | 265.2 |

=== Garmisch-Partenkirchen ===
HS 142 Große Olympiaschanze, Germany
1 January 2019

| Rank | Name | Nationality | Jump 1 (m) | Round 1 (pts) | Jump 2 (m) | Round 2 (pts) | Total Points |
|---|---|---|---|---|---|---|---|
| 1 | Ryoyu Kobayashi | Japan | 136.5 | 129.5 | 133.0 | 137.1 | 266.6 |
| 2 | Markus Eisenbichler | Germany | 138.0 | 129.3 | 135.0 | 135.4 | 264.7 |
| 3 | Dawid Kubacki | Poland | 133.5 | 122.7 | 133.0 | 133.5 | 256.2 |
| 4 | Roman Koudelka | Czech Republic | 133.0 | 116.7 | 134.5 | 137.1 | 253.8 |
| 5 | Junshirō Kobayashi | Japan | 131.0 | 119.4 | 131.5 | 130.0 | 249.4 |
| 6 | Kamil Stoch | Poland | 129.0 | 110.3 | 134.0 | 138.9 | 249.2 |
| 7 | Stephan Leyhe | Germany | 128.0 | 110.8 | 135.0 | 138.2 | 249.0 |
| 8 | Timi Zajc | Slovenia | 132.0 | 116.4 | 132.5 | 132.3 | 248.7 |
| 9 | Halvor Egner Granerud | Norway | 127.0 | 114.7 | 132.0 | 130.7 | 245.4 |
| 10 | Andreas Stjernen | Norway | 129.5 | 112.5 | 134.0 | 132.8 | 245.3 |

=== Innsbruck ===
HS 130 Bergiselschanze, Austria
4 January 2019

| Rank | Name | Nationality | Jump 1 (m) | Round 1 (pts) | Jump 2 (m) | Round 2 (pts) | Total Points |
|---|---|---|---|---|---|---|---|
| 1 | Ryoyu Kobayashi | Japan | 136.5 | 137.0 | 131.0 | 130.0 | 267.0 |
| 2 | Stefan Kraft | Austria | 129.5 | 126.8 | 130.5 | 127.4 | 254.2 |
| 3 | Andreas Stjernen | Norway | 131.0 | 123.5 | 126.0 | 119.2 | 242.7 |
| 4 | Stephan Leyhe | Germany | 129.0 | 120.4 | 127.5 | 118.7 | 239.1 |
| 5 | Kamil Stoch | Poland | 126.5 | 119.2 | 131.0 | 114.9 | 234.1 |
| 6 | Yukiya Satō | Japan | 129.0 | 120.2 | 123.5 | 111.2 | 231.4 |
| 7 | Killian Peier | Switzerland | 127.0 | 117.9 | 123.0 | 112.7 | 230.6 |
| 8 | Richard Freitag | Germany | 128.0 | 117.7 | 124.0 | 112.3 | 230.0 |
| 9 | Roman Koudelka | Czech Republic | 123.0 | 109.6 | 125.0 | 118.8 | 228.4 |
| 10 | Timi Zajc | Slovenia | 130.0 | 122.1 | 119.5 | 104.5 | 226.6 |

=== Bischofshofen ===
HS 142 Paul-Ausserleitner-Schanze, Austria
6 January 2019

| Rank | Name | Nationality | Jump 1 (m) | Round 1 (pts) | Jump 2 (m) | Round 2 (pts) | Total Points |
|---|---|---|---|---|---|---|---|
| 1 | Ryoyu Kobayashi | Japan | 135.0 | 136.1 | 137.5 | 146.0 | 282.1 |
| 2 | Dawid Kubacki | Poland | 138.0 | 139.9 | 130.0 | 128.4 | 268.3 |
| 3 | Stefan Kraft | Austria | 134.0 | 137.1 | 131.5 | 130.4 | 267.5 |
| 4 | Stephan Leyhe | Germany | 126.0 | 123.7 | 137.0 | 142.3 | 266.0 |
| 5 | Markus Eisenbichler | Germany | 137.0 | 140.1 | 131.5 | 215.4 | 265.5 |
| 6 | Roman Koudelka | Czech Republic | 133.0 | 129.3 | 130.5 | 130.4 | 259.7 |
| 7 | Halvor Egner Granerud | Norway | 128.5 | 128.0 | 135.0 | 130.0 | 258.0 |
| 8 | Killian Peier | Switzerland | 131.5 | 125.8 | 127.0 | 128.8 | 254.6 |
| 9 | Robert Johansson | Norway | 132.0 | 130.2 | 126.5 | 123.1 | 253.3 |
| 10 | Karl Geiger | Germany | 122.0 | 117.3 | 133.5 | 132.2 | 249.5 |

== Overall standings ==
The final standings after all four events:

| Rank | Name | Nationality | Oberstdorf | Garmisch- Partenkirchen | Innsbruck | Bischofshofen | Total points |
|---|---|---|---|---|---|---|---|
| 1st place, gold medalist(s) | Ryoyu Kobayashi | Japan | 282.3 (1) | 266.6 (1) | 267.0 (1) | 282.1 (1) | 1,098.0 |
| 2nd place, silver medalist(s) | Markus Eisenbichler | Germany | 281.9 (2) | 264.7 (2) | 223.8 (13) | 265.5 (5) | 1,035.9 |
| 3rd place, bronze medalist(s) | Stephan Leyhe | Germany | 260.0 (13) | 249.0 (7) | 239.1 (4) | 266.0 (4) | 1,014.1 |
| 4 | Dawid Kubacki | Poland | 269.8 (5) | 256.2 (3) | 216.5 (18) | 268.3 (2) | 1,010.8 |
| 5 | Roman Koudelka | Czech Republic | 264.4 (11) | 253.8 (4) | 228.4 (9) | 259.7 (6) | 1,006.3 |
| 6 | Kamil Stoch | Poland | 267.6 (8) | 249.2 (6) | 234.1 (5) | 243.1 (12) | 994.0 |
| 7 | Andreas Stjernen | Norway | 278.2 (4) | 245.3 (10) | 242.7 (3) | 221.8 (25) | 988.0 |
| 8 | Robert Johansson | Norway | 268.0 (7) | 235.8 (19) | 226.1 (11) | 253.3 (9) | 983.2 |
| 9 | Daniel Huber | Austria | 265.2 (10) | 238.8 (15) | 222.8 (14) | 243.6 (11) | 970.4 |
| 10 | Killian Peier | Switzerland | 241.2 (19) | 232.9 (23) | 230.6 (7) | 254.6 (8) | 959.3 |
