= 2022–23 Four Hills Tournament =

Ski jumping competition

Four Hills Tournament at the 2022–23 FIS Ski Jumping World Cup
- Venue: Schattenbergschanze, Große Olympiaschanze, Bergiselschanze, Paul-Ausserleitner-Schanze
- Location: Austria, Germany
- Dates: 29 December 2022 – 6 January 2023

Medalists
gold medal	(Norway) Halvor Egner Granerud
silver medal	(Poland) Dawid Kubacki
bronze medal	(Slovenia) Anže Lanišek

The 2022–23 Four Hills Tournament took place at the four traditional venues of Oberstdorf, Garmisch-Partenkirchen, Innsbruck, and Bischofshofen, located in Germany and Austria, between 29 December 2022 and 6 January 2023.

== Results ==
=== Oberstdorf ===
HS137 Arena Oberstdorf, Germany
29 December 2022

Rank	Name	Nationality	Jump 1 (m)	Round 1 (pts)	Jump 2 (m)	Round 2 (pts)	Total Points
1	Halvor Egner Granerud	Norway	142.5	151.5	139.0	160.9	312.4
2	Piotr Żyła	Poland	132.5	146.9	137.0	152.1	299.0
3	Dawid Kubacki	Poland	140.5	145.9	136.0	149.0	294.9
4	Karl Geiger	Germany	136.5	142.0	134.0	151.6	293.6
5	Stefan Kraft	Austria	133.5	139.2	138.0	152.8	292.0
6	Andreas Wellinger	Germany	135.0	144.5	132.0	140.7	285.2
7	Lovro Kos	Slovenia	125.5	134.1	133.5	146.6	280.7
8	Daniel Tschofenig	Austria	122.5	133.5	132.5	145.3	278.8
9	Kamil Stoch	Poland	133.0	139.7	130.0	136.4	276.1
10	Anže Lanišek	Slovenia	119.5	125.2	129.0	142.2	267.4

=== Garmisch-Partenkirchen ===
HS142 Große Olympiaschanze, Germany
1 January 2023

Rank	Name	Nationality	Jump 1 (m)	Round 1 (pts)	Jump 2 (m)	Round 2 (pts)	Total Points
1	Halvor Egner Granerud	Norway	140.0	148.5	142.0	155.2	303.7
2	Anže Lanišek	Slovenia	140.5	147.9	137.0	149.4	297.3
3	Dawid Kubacki	Poland	136.0	141.7	138.5	152.7	294.4
4	Manuel Fettner	Austria	136.0	136.3	138.0	143.3	279.6
5	Jan Hörl	Austria	136.0	135.7	138.5	143.2	278.9
6	Piotr Żyła	Poland	135.5	140.8	134.5	136.2	277.0
7	Daniel Tschofenig	Austria	131.0	131.6	136.0	143.8	275.4
8	Andreas Wellinger	Germany	137.0	136.7	133.0	136.4	273.1
9	Kamil Stoch	Poland	135.0	133.5	134.5	139.2	272.7
10	Michael Hayböck	Austria	128.5	125.2	140.0	144.6	269.8

=== Innsbruck ===
HS128 Bergiselschanze, Austria
4 January 2023

Rank	Name	Nationality	Jump 1 (m)	Round 1 (pts)	Jump 2 (m)	Round 2 (pts)	Total Points
1	Dawid Kubacki	Poland	127.0	137.4	121.5	127.8	265.2
2	Halvor Egner Granerud	Norway	123.0	124.6	133.0	137.1	261.7
3	Anže Lanišek	Slovenia	127.0	130.5	121.5	128.3	258.8
4	Stefan Kraft	Austria	129.5	126.2	125.0	128.8	255.0
5	Kamil Stoch	Poland	127.0	128.0	121.0	121.2	249.2
6	Marius Lindvik	Norway	128.0	127.9	121.0	118.3	246.2
7	Michael Hayböck	Austria	128.0	122.6	122.0	116.5	239.1
8	Daniel Tschofenig	Austria	117.0	112.6	120.5	121.7	234.3
9	Jan Hörl	Austria	122.5	121.2	119.0	112.5	233.7
10	Piotr Żyła	Poland	120.5	115.0	119.0	116.5	231.5

=== Bischofshofen ===
HS142 Paul-Ausserleitner-Schanze, Austria
6 January 2023

Rank	Name	Nationality	Jump 1 (m)	Round 1 (pts)	Jump 2 (m)	Round 2 (pts)	Total Points
1	Halvor Egner Granerud	Norway	139.5	157.1	143.5	156.3	313.4
2	Anže Lanišek	Slovenia	140.5	156.0	139.0	149.5	305.5
3	Dawid Kubacki	Poland	135.5	152.2	140.0	151.5	303.7
4	Michael Hayböck	Austria	138.5	151.8	137.0	145.8	297.6
5	Jan Hörl	Austria	135.5	144.3	140.5	147.8	292.1
6	Kamil Stoch	Poland	138.0	148.8	134.5	141.1	289.9
7	Peter Prevc	Slovenia	134.5	144.0	139.5	144.6	288.6
8	Manuel Fettner	Austria	134.5	143.9	139.0	141.7	285.6
9	Timi Zajc	Slovenia	135.5	143.3	137.0	142.0	285.3
10	Clemens Aigner	Austria	136.5	139.8	139.5	142.7	282.5

== Overall standings ==
The final standings after all four events:

Rank	Name	Nationality	Oberstdorf	Garmisch- Partenkirchen	Innsbruck	Bischofshofen	Total Points
1st place, gold medalist(s)	Halvor Egner Granerud	Norway	312.4 (1)	303.7 (1)	261.7 (2)	313.4 (1)	1,191.2
2nd place, silver medalist(s)	Dawid Kubacki	Poland	294.9 (3)	294.4 (3)	265.2 (1)	303.7 (3)	1,158.2
3rd place, bronze medalist(s)	Anže Lanišek	Slovenia	267.4 (10)	297.3 (2)	258.8 (3)	305.5 (2)	1,129.0
4	Piotr Żyła	Poland	299.0 (2)	277.0 (6)	231.5 (10)	282.5 (10)	1,090.0
5	Kamil Stoch	Poland	276.1 (9)	272.7 (9)	249.2 (5)	289.9 (6)	1,087.9
6	Stefan Kraft	Austria	292.0 (5)	249.5 (18)	255.0 (4)	281.0 (14)	1,077.5
7	Michael Hayböck	Austria	262.1 (12)	269.8 (10)	239.1 (7)	297.6 (4)	1,068.6
8	Daniel Tschofenig	Austria	278.8 (8)	275.4 (7)	234.3 (8)	272.6 (18)	1,061.1
9	Jan Hörl	Austria	251.6 (16)	278.9 (5)	233.7 (9)	292.1 (5)	1,056.3
10	Manuel Fettner	Austria	260.3 (13)	279.6 (4)	225.4 (15)	285.6 (8)	1,050.9
