= 1990–91 Four Hills Tournament =

Ski jumping competition

The 1990-91 Four Hills Tournament took place at the four traditional venues of Oberstdorf, Garmisch-Partenkirchen, Innsbruck and Bischofshofen, located in Germany and Austria, between 30 December 1990 and 6 January 1991. This was the first Four Hills Tournament to be held after the German reunification on 3 October 1990.

== Results ==
Date	Place	Hill	Size	Winner	Second	Third	Ref.
30 Dec 1990	(Germany) Oberstdorf	Schattenbergschanze K-115	LH	(Germany) Jens Weißflog	(Austria) Andreas Felder	(Austria) Heinz Kuttin	
1 Jan 1991	(Germany) Garmisch-Partenkirchen	Große Olympiaschanze K-107	LH	(Germany) Jens Weißflog (Austria) Andreas Felder		(Austria) Stefan Horngacher	
4 Jan 1991	(Austria) Innsbruck	Bergiselschanze K-109	LH	(Finland) Ari-Pekka Nikkola	(Germany) Jens Weißflog	(Germany) Dieter Thoma	
6 Jan 1991	(Austria) Bischofshofen	Paul-Ausserleitner-Schanze K-111	LH	(Austria) Andreas Felder	(Austria) Ernst Vettori	(Finland) Ari-Pekka Nikkola	

== Overall ==
Pos	Ski Jumper	Points
1	(Germany) Jens Weißflog	819.7
2	(Austria) Andreas Felder	805.6
3	(Germany) Dieter Thoma	779.6
4	(Austria) Ernst Vettori	774.8
5	(Austria) Stefan Horngacher	773.1
6	(Finland) Ari-Pekka Nikkola	772.7
7	(Sweden) Mikael Martinsson	751.9
8	(Switzerland) Sylvain Freiholz	729.5
9	(Finland) Vesa Hakala	696.8
10	(Finland) Risto Laakkonen	676.7
