= 2000–01 Four Hills Tournament =

Ski jumping competition

The 2000-01 Four Hills Tournament took place at the four traditional venues of Oberstdorf, Garmisch-Partenkirchen, Innsbruck and Bischofshofen, located in Germany and Austria, between 29 December 2000 and 6 January 2001.

== Results ==
Date	Place	Hill	Size	Winner	Second	Third	Ref.
29 Dec 2000	(Germany) Oberstdorf	Schattenbergschanze K-115	LH	(Germany) Martin Schmitt	(Japan) Noriaki Kasai	(Japan) Masahiko Harada	
1 Jan 2001	(Germany) Garmisch-Partenkirchen	Große Olympiaschanze K-115	LH	(Japan) Noriaki Kasai	(Russia) Dimitry Vassiliev	(Poland) Adam Małysz	
4 Jan 2001	(Austria) Innsbruck	Bergiselschanze K-110	LH	(Poland) Adam Małysz	(Finland) Janne Ahonen	(Japan) Noriaki Kasai	
6 Jan 2001	(Austria) Bischofshofen	Paul-Ausserleitner-Schanze K-120	LH	(Poland) Adam Małysz	(Finland) Janne Ahonen	(Austria) Andreas Widhölzl	

== Overall ==
Pos	Ski Jumper	Points
1	(Poland) Adam Małysz	1045,9
2	(Finland) Janne Ahonen	941,5
3	(Germany) Martin Schmitt	920,1
4	(Germany) Sven Hannawald	885,3
5	(Austria) Stefan Horngacher	884,5
6	(Finland) Matti Hautamäki	856,8
7	(Finland) Risto Jussilainen	826,5
8	(Austria) Martin Höllwarth	805,6
9	(Austria) Wolfgang Loitzl	791,7
10	(Norway) Tommy Ingebrigtsen	782,9
