= 1980–81 Four Hills Tournament =

Ski jumping competition

The 1980-81 Four Hills Tournament took place at the four traditional venues of Oberstdorf, Garmisch-Partenkirchen, Innsbruck and Bischofshofen, located in Germany and Austria, between 29 December 1980 and 6 January 1981.

== Results ==
Date	Place	Hill	Size	Winner	Second	Third	Ref.
30 Dec 1980	(West Germany) Oberstdorf	Schattenbergschanze K-110	LH	(Austria) Hubert Neuper	(Finland) Jari Puikkonen	(Norway) Roger Ruud	
1 Jan 1981	(West Germany) Garmisch-Partenkirchen	Große Olympiaschanze K-107	LH	(Canada) Horst Bulau	(Norway) Per Bergerud	(Austria) Armin Kogler	
4 Jan 1981	(Austria) Innsbruck	Bergiselschanze K-104	LH	(Finland) Jari Puikkonen	(Austria) Hubert Neuper	(Austria) Armin Kogler	
6 Jan 1981	(Austria) Bischofshofen	Paul-Ausserleitner-Schanze K-109	LH	(Austria) Armin Kogler	(Austria) Hubert Neuper	(Norway) Per Bergerud	

== Overall ==
Pos	Ski Jumper	Points
1	(Austria) Hubert Neuper	931.0
2	(Austria) Armin Kogler	927.4
3	(Finland) Jari Puikkonen	892.8
4	(Norway) Roger Ruud	891.2
5	(Norway) Per Bergerud	886.8
6	(Austria) Hans Wallner	864.7
7	(Norway) Johan Sætre	864.0
8	(East Germany) Matthias Buse	854.0
9	(Finland) Pentti Kokkonen	841.5
10	(Canada) Horst Bulau	835.8
