= 1986–87 Four Hills Tournament =

Ski jumping competition

The 1986-87 Four Hills Tournament took place at the four traditional venues of Oberstdorf, Garmisch-Partenkirchen, Innsbruck and Bischofshofen, located in Germany and Austria, between 30 December 1986 and 6 January 1987.

== Results ==
Date	Place	Hill	Size	Winner	Second	Third	Ref.
30 Dec 1986	(West Germany) Oberstdorf	Schattenbergschanze K-115	LH	(Norway) Vegard Opaas	(West Germany) Thomas Klauser	(Austria) Andreas Felder	
1 Jan 1987	(West Germany) Garmisch-Partenkirchen	Große Olympiaschanze K-107	LH	(West Germany) Andreas Bauer	(Finland) Jukka Kalso	(East Germany) Ulf Findeisen	
4 Jan 1987	(Austria) Innsbruck	Bergiselschanze K-109	LH	(Socialist Federal Republic of Yugoslavia) Primož Ulaga	(Norway) Hroar Stjernen	(Czechoslovakia) Jiří Parma	
6 Jan 1987	(Austria) Bischofshofen	Paul-Ausserleitner-Schanze K-111	LH	(Finland) Tuomo Ylipulli	(Austria) Ernst Vettori	(Norway) Vegard Opaas	

== Overall ==
Pos	Ski Jumper	Points
1	(Austria) Ernst Vettori	710.2
2	(Norway) Vegard Opaas	703.3
3	(East Germany) Ulf Findeisen	702.4
4	(Socialist Federal Republic of Yugoslavia) Miran Tepeš	691.4
5	(West Germany) Thomas Klauser	684.6
6	(West Germany) Andreas Bauer	684.4
7	(East Germany) Jens Weißflog	681.7
8	(Socialist Federal Republic of Yugoslavia) Primož Ulaga	676.9
9	(Socialist Federal Republic of Yugoslavia) Matjaž Debelak	674.2
10	(Switzerland) Gérard Balanche	665.9
