= Four Hills Tournament =

Annual ski jumping event in Germany and Austria

Four Hills Tournament Vierschanzentournee
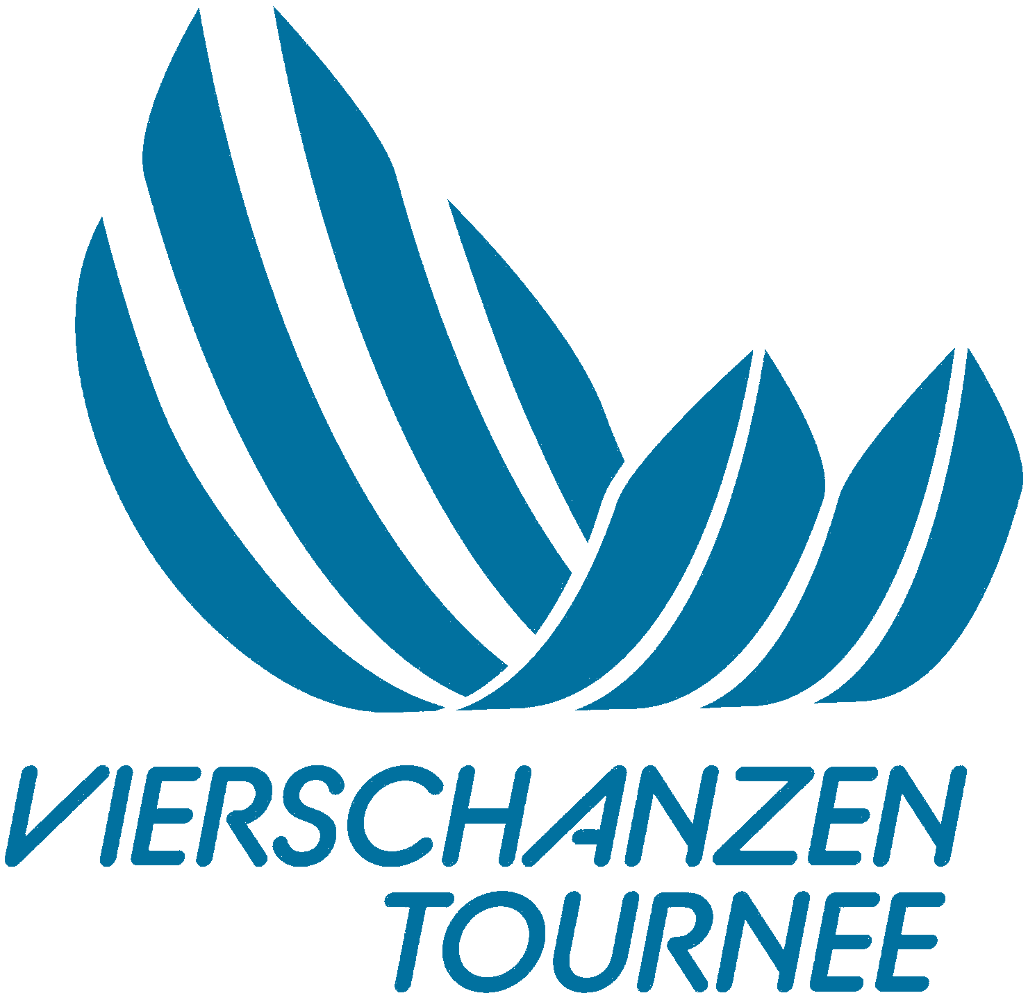
- logotype
- Status: active
- Genre: sporting event
- Date: 29/30 December – 6 January
- Frequency: annual
- Country: Austria; Germany
- Inaugurated: 1953
- Most recent: 2025–26
- Organiser: FIS
- Website: vierschanzentournee.com

The Four Hills Tournament (German: Vierschanzentournee) or the German-Austrian Ski Jumping Week (German: Deutsch-Österreichische Skisprung-Woche) is a ski jumping event composed of four World Cup events and has taken place in Germany and Austria each year since 1953. With few exceptions, it has consisted of the ski jumping events held at Oberstdorf, Garmisch-Partenkirchen, Innsbruck and Bischofshofen, in this order.

The Four Hills Tournament champion is the one who gets the most points over the four events. Unlike the World Cup ranking, however, the actual points scored during the competitions are the ones that are used to determine the winner. In 2005–06, Janne Ahonen and Jakub Janda shared the overall victory after finishing with exactly the same points total after the four competitions. In 2001–02, the anniversary 50th edition, Sven Hannawald was the first to achieve the grand slam of ski jumping, winning all four events in the same edition. In 2017–18 season Kamil Stoch became the second ski jumper in history to obtain this achievement, and just a year later, in the 2018–19 edition, Ryōyū Kobayashi became the third.

The four individual events themselves are part of the World Cup and award points toward the world cup in exactly the same manner as all other world cup events.

From 2026-27 season, for the first time in the history of the competition, there will be a women's edition of the tournament.

== Tournament hills ==
Date	Image	Place	Hill name	K-Point	Hill size	Hill record	Four Hills Tournament is located in Austria
29 or 30 December		Oberstdorf, Germany	Schattenbergschanze	K-120	HS 137	143.5 m (2003) (Norway) Sigurd Pettersen	Four Hills Tournament is located in Austria
1 January		Garmisch-Partenkirchen, Germany	Große Olympiaschanze	K-125	HS 142	145.0 m (2025) (Austria) Michael Hayböck	Four Hills Tournament is located in Austria
3 or 4 January		Innsbruck, Austria	Bergiselschanze	K-120	HS 128	138.0 m (2015) (Austria) Michael Hayböck	Four Hills Tournament is located in Austria
6 January		Bischofshofen, Austria	Paul-Ausserleitner-Schanze	K-125	HS 142	145.0 m (2019) (Poland) Dawid Kubacki	Four Hills Tournament is located in Austria

Traditionally, the order of the tournament competitions has been: Oberstdorf, Garmisch-Partenkirchen, Innsbruck, Bischofshofen – with the following exceptions:

- 1953: Garmisch-Partenkirchen was the first, and Oberstdorf the second event.
- 1956–57, 1961–62, 1962–63: Innsbruck was the second event, and Garmisch-Partenkirchen third.
- 1971–72: Innsbruck was first, and Oberstdorf third.
- 2007–08, 2021–22: The Innsbruck event was cancelled due to bad weather, and replaced with an additional competition at Bischofshofen.

== Knock-out system ==
One of the tournament's peculiarities is its qualifying system. Unlike other ski jumping events where the best 30 competitors in the first round qualify for the second round, all Four Hills events follow a knock-out system first introduced for the 1996–97 season.

The 50 competitors are divided into 25 pairs. All 25 winners of these duels plus the five best lucky losers qualify for the second round. It is theoretically possible that a competitor who finishes the first round 12th will not qualify for the second round (if he loses his internal duel, five lucky losers and winners of their duels have better results) while the one with the 49th first series result may still qualify (if his "rival" has the worst result). On the other hand, jumpers are less likely to be disadvantaged by a possible significant change in weather conditions between the start and end of the first series. A change in the direction and speed of the wind can make it impossible for the best jumpers to produce a good result. In the event of significantly worse conditions during the second half of the first series, the possibility exists that most of the best jumpers would be eliminated by bad luck alone. Directly pairing rivals reduces the impact of these conditions. In this competition format the qualifying series are valued as well, since jumpers with a better qualification result will have the opportunity to compete against jumpers with worse result. Therefore, it is not enough for a jumper to be among 50 best jumpers in qualifications (with whatever result), but it is better for him to achieve a result as good as possible.

The first jumper in the competition is the one who qualified 26th, followed by his pair who qualified 25th. The next pair has 27th and 24th from the qualification, one after that 28th and 23rd etc. The last pair has last qualified jumper against qualification winner.

If qualification is postponed until the day of competition, the knock-out system is not used, and competition follows regular world cup rules. Because of that in the 2007/08 tournament, the knock-out system was used only in Oberstdorf.

== List of winners ==
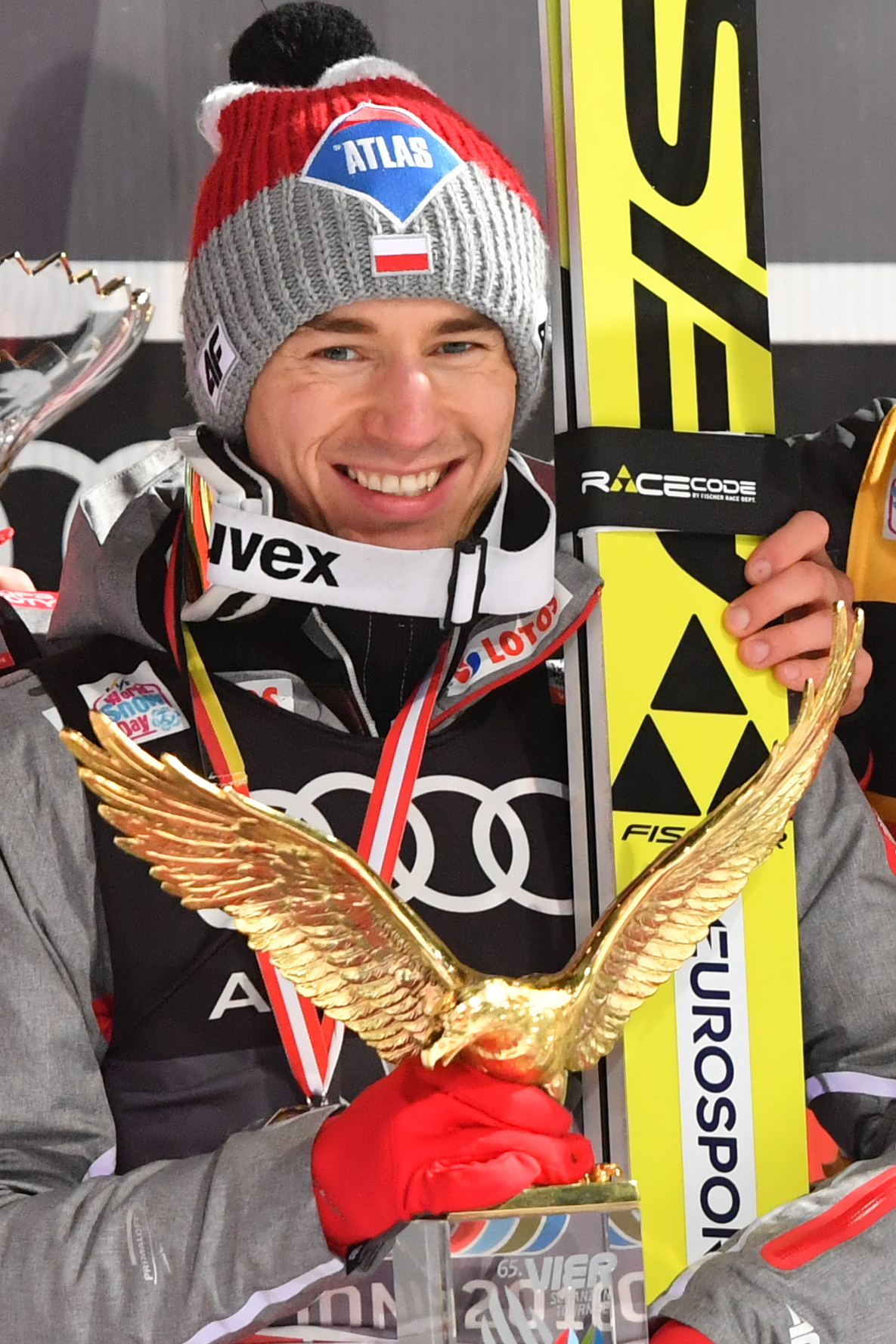
Four Hills Trophy (Photo)

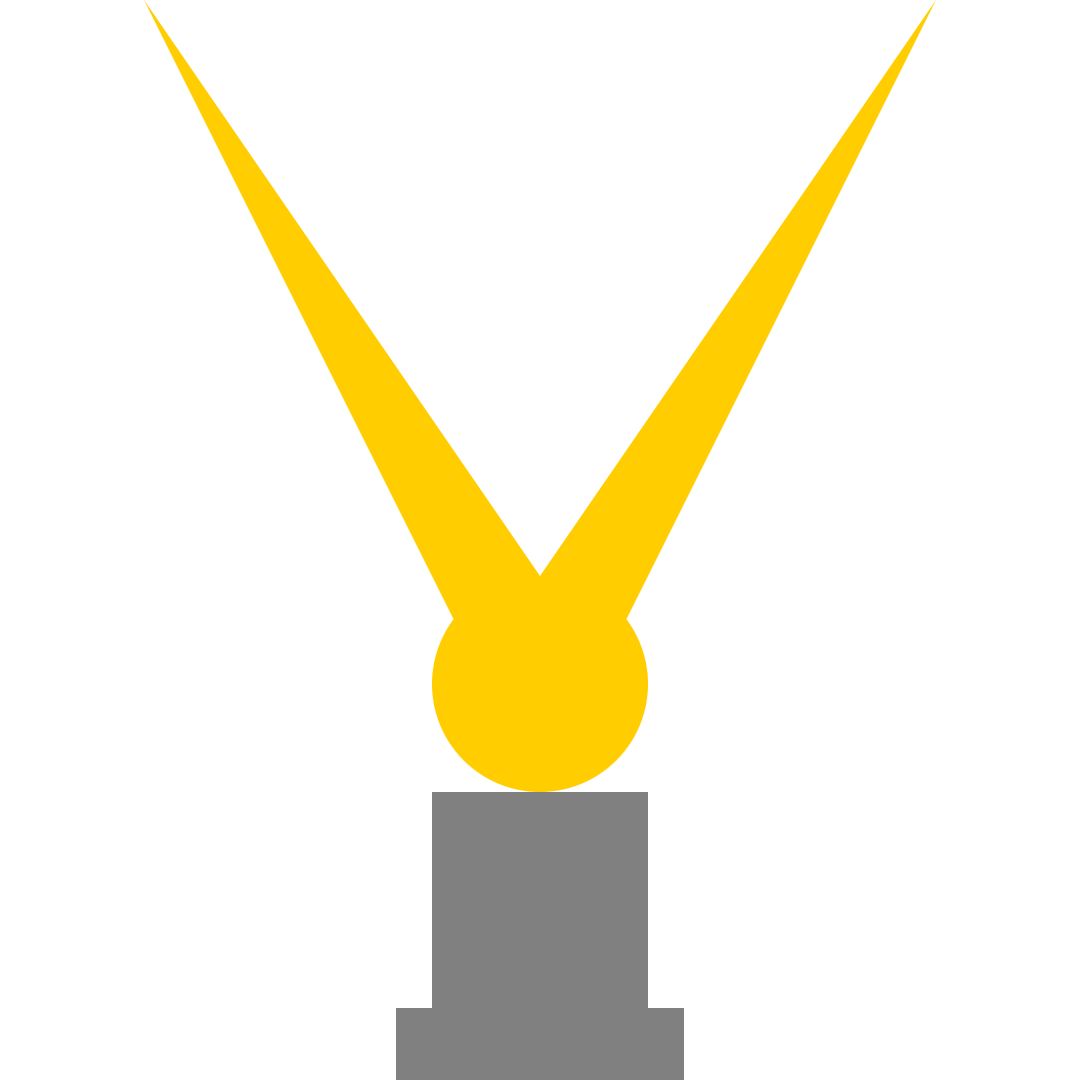
Four Hills Trophy (Sketch)

*	Won all four events in the same season
	Won three events in the same season

Year	Oberstdorf	Garmisch- Partenkirchen	Innsbruck	Bischofshofen	Overall victory
1953	(Norway) Erling Kroken	(Norway) Asgeir Dølplads (Note: In the inaugural tournament, the first competition was held in Garmisch-Partenkirchen)	(Austria) Sepp Bradl	(Norway) Halvor Næs	(Austria) Sepp Bradl
1953–54	(Norway) Olav Bjørnstad	(Norway) Olav Bjørnstad	(Norway) Olav Bjørnstad	(Austria) Sepp Bradl	(Norway) Olav Bjørnstad
1954–55	(Finland) Aulis Kallakorpi	(Finland) Aulis Kallakorpi	(Norway) Torbjørn Ruste	(Norway) Torbjørn Ruste	(Finland) Hemmo Silvennoinen
1955–56	(Finland) Aulis Kallakorpi (Finland) Eino Kirjonen	(Finland) Hemmo Silvennoinen	(Soviet Union) Koba Zakadze	(Soviet Union) Yuri Skvortsov	(Soviet Union) Nikolay Kamenskiy
1956–57	(Finland) Pentti Uotinen	(Soviet Union) Nikolay Kamenskiy (Note: Innsbruck was the second event, and Garmisch-Partenkirchen third.)	(Soviet Union) Nikolai Schamov	(Finland) Eino Kirjonen	(Finland) Pentti Uotinen
1957–58	(Soviet Union) Nikolay Kamenskiy	(Austria) Willi Egger	(East Germany) Helmut Recknagel	(East Germany) Helmut Recknagel	(East Germany) Helmut Recknagel
1958–59	(East Germany) Helmut Recknagel	(East Germany) Helmut Recknagel	(East Germany) Helmut Recknagel	(Austria) Walter Habersatter	(East Germany) Helmut Recknagel
1959–60	(West Germany) Max Bolkart	(West Germany) Max Bolkart	(West Germany) Max Bolkart	(Austria) Alwin Plank	(West Germany) Max Bolkart
1960–61	(Finland) Juhani Kärkinen	(Soviet Union) Koba Zakadze	(Finland) Kalevi Kärkinen	(East Germany) Helmut Recknagel	(East Germany) Helmut Recknagel (3)
1961–62	(Finland) Eino Kirjonen	(West Germany) Georg Thoma	(Austria) Willi Egger	(Austria) Willi Egger	(Finland) Eino Kirjonen
1962–63	(Norway) Toralf Engan	(Norway) Toralf Engan	(Norway) Toralf Engan	(Norway) Torbjørn Yggeseth	(Norway) Toralf Engan
1963–64	(Norway) Torbjørn Yggeseth	(Finland) Veikko Kankkonen	(Finland) Veikko Kankkonen	(Austria) Baldur Preiml	(Finland) Veikko Kankkonen
1964–65	(Norway) Torgeir Brandtzæg	(Finland) Erkki Pukka	(Norway) Torgeir Brandtzæg	(Norway) Bjørn Wirkola	(Norway) Torgeir Brandtzæg
1965–66	(Finland) Veikko Kankkonen	(Finland) Paavo Lukkariniemi	(East Germany) Dieter Neuendorf	(Finland) Veikko Kankkonen	(Finland) Veikko Kankkonen (2)
1966–67	(East Germany) Dieter Neuendorf	(Norway) Bjørn Wirkola	(Norway) Bjørn Wirkola	(Norway) Bjørn Wirkola	(Norway) Bjørn Wirkola
1967–68	(East Germany) Dieter Neuendorf	(Norway) Bjørn Wirkola	(Soviet Union) Gariy Napalkov	(Czechoslovakia) Jiří Raška	(Norway) Bjørn Wirkola
1968–69	(Norway) Bjørn Wirkola	(Norway) Bjørn Wirkola	(Norway) Bjørn Wirkola	(Czechoslovakia) Jiří Raška	(Norway) Bjørn Wirkola (3)
1969–70	(Soviet Union) Gariy Napalkov	(Czechoslovakia) Jiří Raška	(Norway) Bjørn Wirkola	(Czechoslovakia) Jiří Raška	(East Germany) Horst Queck
1970–71	(Norway) Ingolf Mork	(Norway) Ingolf Mork	(Czechoslovakia) Zbyněk Hubač	(Norway) Ingolf Mork	(Czechoslovakia) Jiří Raška
1971–72	(Japan) Yukio Kasaya (Note: Innsbruck was the first event, and Oberstdorf third.)	(Japan) Yukio Kasaya	(Japan) Yukio Kasaya	(Norway) Bjørn Wirkola	(Norway) Ingolf Mork
1972–73	(East Germany) Rainer Schmidt	(East Germany) Rainer Schmidt	(Soviet Union) Sergei Botschkov	(Czechoslovakia) Rudolf Höhnl	(East Germany) Rainer Schmidt
1973–74	(East Germany) Hans-Georg Aschenbach	(Switzerland) Walter Steiner	(East Germany) Hans-Georg Aschenbach	(East Germany) Bernd Eckstein	(East Germany) Hans-Georg Aschenbach
1974–75	(Austria) Willi Pürstl	(Austria) Karl Schnabl	(Austria) Karl Schnabl	(Austria) Karl Schnabl	(Austria) Willi Pürstl
1975–76	(Austria) Toni Innauer	(Austria) Toni Innauer	(East Germany) Jochen Danneberg	(Austria) Toni Innauer	(East Germany) Jochen Danneberg
1976–77	(Austria) Toni Innauer	(East Germany) Jochen Danneberg	(East Germany) Henry Glaß	(Switzerland) Walter Steiner	(East Germany) Jochen Danneberg (2)
1977–78	(East Germany) Matthias Buse	(East Germany) Jochen Danneberg	(Norway) Per Bergerud	(Finland) Kari Ylianttila	(Finland) Kari Ylianttila
1978–79	(Soviet Union) Yury Ivanov	(Czechoslovakia) Josef Samek	(Finland) Pentti Kokkonen	(Finland) Pentti Kokkonen	(Finland) Pentti Kokkonen
1979–80	(East Germany) Jochen Danneberg	(Austria) Hubert Neuper	(Austria) Hubert Neuper	(East Germany) Martin Weber	(Austria) Hubert Neuper
1980–81	(Austria) Hubert Neuper	(Canada) Horst Bulau	(Finland) Jari Puikkonen	(Austria) Armin Kogler	(Austria) Hubert Neuper (2)
1981–82	(Finland) Matti Nykänen	(Norway) Roger Ruud	(Norway) Per Bergerud (East Germany) Manfred Deckert	(Austria) Hubert Neuper	(East Germany) Manfred Deckert
1982–83	(Canada) Horst Bulau	(Austria) Armin Kogler	(Finland) Matti Nykänen	(East Germany) Jens Weißflog	(Finland) Matti Nykänen
1983–84	(East Germany) Klaus Ostwald	(East Germany) Jens Weißflog	(East Germany) Jens Weißflog	(East Germany) Jens Weißflog	(East Germany) Jens Weißflog
1984–85	(Austria) Ernst Vettori	(East Germany) Jens Weißflog	(Finland) Matti Nykänen	(Norway) Hroar Stjernen	(East Germany) Jens Weißflog
1985–86	(Finland) Pekka Suorsa	(Czechoslovakia) Pavel Ploc	(Finland) Jari Puikkonen	(Austria) Ernst Vettori	(Austria) Ernst Vettori
1986–87	(Norway) Vegard Opaas	(West Germany) Andreas Bauer	(Socialist Federal Republic of Yugoslavia) Primož Ulaga	(Finland) Tuomo Ylipulli	(Austria) Ernst Vettori (2)
1987–88	(Czechoslovakia) Pavel Ploc	(Finland) Matti Nykänen	(Finland) Matti Nykänen	(Finland) Matti Nykänen	(Finland) Matti Nykänen (2)
1988–89	(West Germany) Dieter Thoma	(Finland) Matti Nykänen	(Sweden) Jan Boklöv	(United States) Mike Holland	(Finland) Risto Laakkonen
1989–90	(West Germany) Dieter Thoma	(East Germany) Jens Weißflog	(Finland) Ari-Pekka Nikkola	(Czechoslovakia) František Jež	(West Germany) Dieter Thoma
1990–91	(Germany) Jens Weißflog	(Austria) Andreas Felder (Germany) Jens Weißflog	(Finland) Ari-Pekka Nikkola	(Austria) Andreas Felder	(Germany) Jens Weißflog
1991–92	(Finland) Toni Nieminen	(Austria) Andreas Felder	(Finland) Toni Nieminen	(Finland) Toni Nieminen	(Finland) Toni Nieminen
1992–93	(Germany) Christof Duffner	(Japan) Noriaki Kasai	(Austria) Andreas Goldberger	(Austria) Andreas Goldberger	(Austria) Andreas Goldberger
1993–94	(Germany) Jens Weißflog	(Norway) Espen Bredesen	(Austria) Andreas Goldberger	(Norway) Espen Bredesen	(Norway) Espen Bredesen
1994–95	(Austria) Reinhard Schwarzenberger	(Finland) Janne Ahonen	(Japan) Kazuyoshi Funaki	(Austria) Andreas Goldberger	(Austria) Andreas Goldberger (2)
1995–96	(Finland) Mika Laitinen	(Austria) Reinhard Schwarzenberger	(Austria) Andreas Goldberger	(Germany) Jens Weißflog	(Germany) Jens Weißflog (4)
1996–97	(Germany) Dieter Thoma	(Slovenia) Primož Peterka	(Japan) Kazuyoshi Funaki	(Germany) Dieter Thoma	(Slovenia) Primož Peterka
1997–98	(Japan) Kazuyoshi Funaki	(Japan) Kazuyoshi Funaki	(Japan) Kazuyoshi Funaki	(Germany) Sven Hannawald	(Japan) Kazuyoshi Funaki
1998–99	(Germany) Martin Schmitt	(Germany) Martin Schmitt	(Japan) Noriaki Kasai	(Austria) Andreas Widhölzl	(Finland) Janne Ahonen
1999–00	(Germany) Martin Schmitt	(Austria) Andreas Widhölzl	(Austria) Andreas Widhölzl	(Austria) Andreas Widhölzl	(Austria) Andreas Widhölzl
2000–01	(Germany) Martin Schmitt	(Japan) Noriaki Kasai	(Poland) Adam Małysz	(Poland) Adam Małysz	(Poland) Adam Małysz
2001–02	(Germany) Sven Hannawald	(Germany) Sven Hannawald	(Germany) Sven Hannawald	(Germany) Sven Hannawald	(Germany) Sven Hannawald *
2002–03	(Germany) Sven Hannawald	(Slovenia) Primož Peterka	(Finland) Janne Ahonen	(Norway) Bjørn Einar Romøren	(Finland) Janne Ahonen
2003–04	(Norway) Sigurd Pettersen	(Norway) Sigurd Pettersen	(Slovenia) Peter Žonta	(Norway) Sigurd Pettersen	(Norway) Sigurd Pettersen
2004–05	(Finland) Janne Ahonen	(Finland) Janne Ahonen	(Finland) Janne Ahonen	(Austria) Martin Höllwarth	(Finland) Janne Ahonen
2005–06	(Finland) Janne Ahonen	(Czech Republic) Jakub Janda	(Norway) Lars Bystøl	(Finland) Janne Ahonen	(Finland) Janne Ahonen (Czech Republic) Jakub Janda
2006–07	(Austria) Gregor Schlierenzauer	(Switzerland) Andreas Küttel	(Norway) Anders Jacobsen	(Austria) Gregor Schlierenzauer	(Norway) Anders Jacobsen
2007–08	(Austria) Thomas Morgenstern	(Austria) Gregor Schlierenzauer	(Finland) Janne Ahonen (Note: The competition was held in Bischofshofen due to bad weather)	(Finland) Janne Ahonen	(Finland) Janne Ahonen (5)
2008–09	(Switzerland) Simon Ammann	(Austria) Wolfgang Loitzl	(Austria) Wolfgang Loitzl	(Austria) Wolfgang Loitzl	(Austria) Wolfgang Loitzl
2009–10	(Austria) Andreas Kofler	(Austria) Gregor Schlierenzauer	(Austria) Gregor Schlierenzauer	(Austria) Thomas Morgenstern	(Austria) Andreas Kofler
2010–11	(Austria) Thomas Morgenstern	(Switzerland) Simon Ammann	(Austria) Thomas Morgenstern	(Norway) Tom Hilde	(Austria) Thomas Morgenstern
2011–12	(Austria) Gregor Schlierenzauer	(Austria) Gregor Schlierenzauer	(Austria) Andreas Kofler	(Austria) Thomas Morgenstern	(Austria) Gregor Schlierenzauer
2012–13	(Norway) Anders Jacobsen	(Norway) Anders Jacobsen	(Austria) Gregor Schlierenzauer	(Austria) Gregor Schlierenzauer	(Austria) Gregor Schlierenzauer (2)
2013–14	(Switzerland) Simon Ammann	(Austria) Thomas Diethart	(Finland) Anssi Koivuranta	(Austria) Thomas Diethart	(Austria) Thomas Diethart
2014–15	(Austria) Stefan Kraft	(Norway) Anders Jacobsen	(Germany) Richard Freitag	(Austria) Michael Hayböck	(Austria) Stefan Kraft
2015–16	(Germany) Severin Freund	(Slovenia) Peter Prevc	(Slovenia) Peter Prevc	(Slovenia) Peter Prevc	(Slovenia) Peter Prevc
2016–17	(Austria) Stefan Kraft	(Norway) Daniel-André Tande	(Norway) Daniel-André Tande	(Poland) Kamil Stoch	(Poland) Kamil Stoch
2017–18	(Poland) Kamil Stoch	(Poland) Kamil Stoch	(Poland) Kamil Stoch	(Poland) Kamil Stoch	(Poland) Kamil Stoch *
2018–19	(Japan) Ryōyū Kobayashi	(Japan) Ryōyū Kobayashi	(Japan) Ryōyū Kobayashi	(Japan) Ryōyū Kobayashi	(Japan) Ryōyū Kobayashi *
2019–20	(Japan) Ryōyū Kobayashi	(Norway) Marius Lindvik	(Norway) Marius Lindvik	(Poland) Dawid Kubacki	(Poland) Dawid Kubacki
2020–21	(Germany) Karl Geiger	(Poland) Dawid Kubacki	(Poland) Kamil Stoch	(Poland) Kamil Stoch	(Poland) Kamil Stoch (3)
2021–22	(Japan) Ryōyū Kobayashi	(Japan) Ryōyū Kobayashi	(Japan) Ryōyū Kobayashi	(Austria) Daniel Huber	(Japan) Ryōyū Kobayashi
2022–23	(Norway) Halvor Egner Granerud	(Norway) Halvor Egner Granerud	(Poland) Dawid Kubacki	(Norway) Halvor Egner Granerud	(Norway) Halvor Egner Granerud
2023–24	(Germany) Andreas Wellinger	(Slovenia) Anže Lanišek	(Austria) Jan Hörl	(Austria) Stefan Kraft	(Japan) Ryōyū Kobayashi (3)
2024–25	(Austria) Stefan Kraft	(Austria) Daniel Tschofenig	(Austria) Stefan Kraft	(Austria) Daniel Tschofenig	(Austria) Daniel Tschofenig
2025–26	(Slovenia) Domen Prevc	(Slovenia) Domen Prevc	(Japan) Ren Nikaido	(Austria) Daniel Tschofenig	(Slovenia) Domen Prevc

== Records ==
=== Individual wins in a season ===
Below is an overview of how many of the tournaments' four events were won by the overall winner in each season:

Events won	Instances	First	Most recent
All four	3	2001–02 - (Germany) Sven Hannawald	2018–19 - (Japan) Ryōyū Kobayashi
Three	17	1953–54 - (Norway) Olav Bjørnstad	2022–23 - (Norway) Halvor Egner Granerud
Two	21	1957–58 - (East Germany) Helmut Recknagel	2025–26 - (Slovenia) Domen Prevc
One	25	1953 - (Austria) Sepp Bradl	2019–20 - (Poland) Dawid Kubacki
None	9	1954–55 - (Finland) Hemmo Silvennoinen	2023–24 - (Japan) Ryōyū Kobayashi

- Note: In the 2005–06 tournament, two competitors ended up as overall winners, so even though there have been 74 tournaments so far, the total in this overview shows 75.

=== Most individual wins ===
Name	Events won	First	Last	Span
(Norway) Bjørn Wirkola	10	1964–65 (Bischofshofen)	1971–72 (Bischofshofen)	8 seasons
(East Germany) (Germany) Jens Weissflog	10	1982–83 (Bischofshofen)	1995–96 (Bischofshofen)	14 seasons
(Finland) Janne Ahonen	9	1994–95 (Garmisch-Partenkirchen)	2007–08 (Bischofshofen)	14 seasons
(Austria) Gregor Schlierenzauer	9	2006–07 (Oberstdorf)	2012–13 (Bischofshofen)	7 seasons
(Japan) Ryōyū Kobayashi	8	2018–19 (Oberstdorf)	2021–22 (Bischofshofen #1)	4 seasons
(Finland) Matti Nykänen	7	1981–82 (Oberstdorf)	1988–89 (Garmisch-Partenkirchen)	8 seasons
(Poland) Kamil Stoch	7	2016–17 (Bischofshofen)	2020–21 (Bischofshofen)	5 seasons
(East Germany) Helmut Recknagel	6	1957–58 (Innsbruck)	1960–61 (Bischofshofen)	4 seasons
(Germany) Sven Hannawald	6	1997–98 (Bischofshofen)	2002–03 (Oberstdorf)	6 seasons
(Austria) Andreas Goldberger	5	1992–93 (Innsbruck)	1995–96 (Innsbruck)	4 seasons
(Japan) Kazuyoshi Funaki	5	1994–95 (Innsbruck)	1997–98 (Innsbruck)	4 seasons
(Austria) Thomas Morgenstern	5	2007–08 (Oberstdorf)	2011–12 (Bischofshofen)	5 seasons
(Austria) Stefan Kraft	5	2014–15 (Oberstdorf)	2024–25 (Innsbruck)	11 seasons
(Finland) Veikko Kankkonen	4	1963–64 (Garmisch-Partenkirchen)	1965–66 (Bischofshofen)	3 seasons
(Czechoslovakia) Jiří Raška	4	1967–68 (Bischofshofen)	1969–70 (Bischofshofen)	3 seasons
(Austria) Toni Innauer	4	1975–76 (Oberstdorf)	1976–77 (Oberstdorf)	2 seasons
(Germany) Jochen Danneberg	4	1975–76 (Innsbruck)	1979–80 (Oberstdorf)	5 seasons
(Austria) Hubert Neuper	4	1979–80 (Garmisch-Partenkirchen)	1981–82 (Bischofshofen)	3 seasons
(Germany) Diether Thoma	4	1988–89 (Oberstdorf)	1996–97 (Bischofshofen)	9 seasons
(Austria) Andreas Widhölzl	4	1998–99 (Bischofshofen)	1999–00 (Bischofshofen)	2 seasons
(Germany) Martin Schmitt	4	1998–99 (Oberstdorf)	2000–01 (Oberstdorf)	4 seasons
(Norway) Anders Jacobsen	4	2006–07 (Innsbruck)	2014–15 (Garmisch-Partenkirchen)	9 seasons
(Norway) Olav Bjørnstad	3	1953–54 (Oberstdorf)	1953–54 (Innsbruck)	1 season
(Finland) Aulis Kallakorpi	3	1954–55 (Oberstdorf)	1955–56 (Oberstdorf)	2 seasons
(West Germany) Max Bolkart	3	1959–60 (Oberstdorf)	1959–60 (Innsbruck)	1 season
(Finland) Eino Kirjonen	3	1955–56 (Oberstdorf)	1961–62 (Oberstdorf)	7 seasons
(Austria) Willi Egger	3	1957–58 (Garmisch-Partenkirchen)	1961–62 (Bischofshofen)	5 seasons
(Norway) Toralf Engan	3	1962–63 (Oberstdorf)	1962–63 (Garmisch-Partenkirchen)	1 season
(East Germany) Dieter Neuendorf	3	1965–66 (Innsbruck)	1967–68 (Oberstdorf)	3 seasons
(Norway) Ingolf Mork	3	1970–71 (Oberstdorf)	1970–71 (Bischofshofen)	1 season
(Japan) Yukio Kasaya	3	1971–72 (Innsbruck)	1971–72 (Oberstdorf)	1 season
(Austria) Karl Schnabl	3	1974–75 (Garmisch-Partenkirchen)	1974–75 (Bischofshofen)	1 season
(Austria) Andreas Felder	3	1990–91 (Garmisch-Partenkirchen)	1991–92 (Garmisch-Partenkirchen)	2 seasons
(Finland) Toni Nieminen	3	1991–92 (Oberstdorf)	1991–92 (Bischofshofen)	1 season
(Japan) Noriaki Kasai	3	1992–93 (Garmisch-Partenkirchen)	2000–01 (Garmisch-Partenkirchen)	9 seasons
(Norway) Sigurd Pettersen	3	2003–04 (Oberstdorf)	2003–04 (Bischofshofen)	1 season
(Austria) Wolfgang Loitzl	3	2008–09 (Garmisch-Partenkirchen)	2008–09 (Bischofshofen)	1 season
(Switzerland) Simon Ammann	3	2008–09 (Oberstdorf)	2013–14 (Oberstdorf)	6 seasons
(Slovenia) Peter Prevc	3	2015–16 (Garmisch-Partenkirchen)	2015–16 (Bischofshofen)	1 season
(Poland) Dawid Kubacki	3	2019–20 (Bischofshofen)	2022–23 (Innsbruck)	4 seasons
(Norway) Halvor Egner Granerud	3	2022–23 (Oberstdorf)	2022–23 (Bischofshofen)	1 season
(Austria) Daniel Tschofenig	3	2024–25 (Garmisch-Partenkirchen)	2025–26 (Bischofshofen)	2 seasons

=== Most overall titles ===
Titles	Name	Tournament(s)
5	(Finland) Janne Ahonen	1998–99, 2002–03, 2004–05, 2005–06, 2007–08
4	(East Germany) (Germany) Jens Weissflog	1983–84, 1984–85, 1990–91, 1995–96
3	(East Germany) Helmut Recknagel	1957–58, 1958–59, 1960–61
3	(Norway) Bjørn Wirkola	1966–67, 1967–68, 1968–69
3	(Poland) Kamil Stoch	2016–17, 2017–18, 2020–21
3	(Japan) Ryōyū Kobayashi	2018–19, 2021–22, 2023–24
2	(Finland) Veikko Kankkonen	1963–64, 1965–66
2	(East Germany) Jochen Danneberg	1975–76, 1976–77
2	(Austria) Hubert Neuper	1979–80, 1980–81
2	(Finland) Matti Nykänen	1982–83, 1987–88
2	(Austria) Ernst Vettori	1985–86, 1986–87
2	(Austria) Andreas Goldberger	1992–93, 1994–95
2	(Austria) Gregor Schlierenzauer	2011–12, 2012–13

=== Consecutive titles ===
Titles	Name	Tournament(s)
3	(Norway) Bjørn Wirkola	1966–67, 1967–68, 1968–69
2	(East Germany) Helmut Recknagel	1957–58, 1958–59
2	(East Germany) Jochen Danneberg	1975–76, 1976–77
2	(Austria) Hubert Neuper	1979–80, 1980–81
2	(East Germany) Jens Weissflog	1983–84, 1984–85
2	(Austria) Ernst Vettori	1985–86, 1986–87
2	(Finland) Janne Ahonen	2004–05, 2005–06
2	(Austria) Gregor Schlierenzauer	2011–12, 2012–13
2	(Poland) Kamil Stoch	2016–17, 2017–18

=== Titles by nation ===
Nations	Titles
Austria	17
Finland	16
Norway	11
East Germany	9
Poland	5
Japan	4
West Germany	4
Germany	3
Slovenia	3
Czechoslovakia	1
Czech Republic	1
Soviet Union	1

- Note: In the 2005–06 tournament, two competitors ended up as overall winners, so even though there have been 74 tournaments so far, the total in this overview shows 75.

=== Memorable events ===
In 1965, Polish jumper Stanisław Marusarz (silver medalist at the 1938 World Championship) who was just visiting the tournament, asked the jury in Garmisch-Partenkirchen to allow him to perform a showcase jump. After a long debate, the jury agreed. Marusarz, who, at the time, was 53 years old (and had last competed nine years prior) completed a jump with a distance of 66 meters, using borrowed skies and boots, and wearing a business attire in which he had attended a New Year's party the night before.

Jens Weißflog was the first ski jumper to reach four wins, winning the tournament in 1983–84, 1984–85, 1990–91, and 1995–96.

The only instance when two competitors were proclaimed overall winners was at the 2005–06 tournament, when both Janne Ahone and Jakub Janda were crowned champions.

In 2000–01, Adam Małysz beat second-placed Janne Ahonen by 104.4 points, which is the biggest winning margin in tournament's history.

The following year, Sven Hannawald became the first person to win all four competitions in a single season. In 2017–18, Kamil Stoch repeated Hannawald's feat, and the following year, Ryōyū Kobayashi became the third person to win all four events in the same season.

== National quota ==
As seen in some other competitions as well, the Four Hills Tournament allows many domestic ski jumpers, most of whom are young, participate in the qualifying round of their local competition (in Austria or Germany), thereby giving them an opportunity to gain experience at the highest level.

== See also ==
- Nordic Tournament
- Raw Air
- Planica7
