= 1991–92 Four Hills Tournament =

Ski jumping competition

The 1991-92 Four Hills Tournament took place at the four traditional venues of Oberstdorf, Garmisch-Partenkirchen, Innsbruck and Bischofshofen, located in Germany and Austria, between 29 December 1991 and 6 January 1992.

== Results ==
Date	Place	Hill	Size	Winner	Second	Third	Ref.
29 Dec 1991	(Germany) Oberstdorf	Schattenbergschanze K-115	LH	(Finland) Toni Nieminen	(Austria) Werner Rathmayr	(Switzerland) Stephan Zünd	
1 Jan 1992	(Germany) Garmisch-Partenkirchen	Große Olympiaschanze K-107	LH	(Austria) Andreas Felder	(Finland) Toni Nieminen	(Switzerland) Stephan Zünd	
4 Jan 1992	(Austria) Innsbruck	Bergiselschanze K-109	LH	(Finland) Toni Nieminen	(Austria) Andreas Goldberger	(Austria) Andreas Felder	
6 Jan 1992	(Austria) Bischofshofen	Paul-Ausserleitner-Schanze K-120	LH	(Finland) Toni Nieminen	(Austria) Martin Höllwarth	(Slovenia) Franci Petek	

== Overall ==
Pos	Ski Jumper	Points
1	(Finland) Toni Nieminen	902.4
2	(Austria) Martin Höllwarth	833.2
3	(Austria) Werner Rathmayr	832.9
4	(Slovenia) Franci Petek	817.7
5	(Czechoslovakia) František Jež	817.1
6	(Austria) Andreas Felder	814.1
7	(Switzerland) Stephan Zünd	806.9
8	(Finland) Ari-Pekka Nikkola	788.9
9	(Czechoslovakia) Jaroslav Sakala	787.9
10	(United States) Jim Holland	780.5
