= 1953–54 Four Hills Tournament =

Ski jumping competition

Four Hills Tournament
- Venues: Schattenbergschanze, Große Olympiaschanze, Bergiselschanze, Paul-Ausserleitner-Schanze
- Location: Germany, Austria
- Dates: 31 December 1953 – 6 January 1954
- Nations: 8

Medalists
| gold medal | (Norway) Olaf Bjørnstad |
| silver medal | (Finland) Eino Kirjonen |
| bronze medal | (Austria) Sepp Bradl |

The second Four Hills tournament was the first one to use the traditional event order of Oberstdorf in December, the New Year's event in Garmisch-Partenkirchen, then Innsbruck and the final in Bischofshofen on Three Kings' Day.

== Participating nations and athletes ==
Jeremy Baig was the first non-European to compete at the Four Hills. Finland was represented for the first time and achieved good results (5 podiums). The defending champion was Sepp Bradl.

The following athletes are on the FIS record, although it is likely incomplete.

| Nation | Athletes |
|---|---|
| Germany | Helmut Böck, Max Bolkart, Toni Brutscher, Franz Dengg, Franz Eder, Willy Gotthold, Heinz Hauser, Sepp Hohenleitner, Sepp Kleisl, Toni Landenhammer, Sepp Weiler |
| Austria | Sepp Bradl, Rudi Dietrich, Ferdi Kerber, Siegfried Kostner, Lois Leodolter, Alwin Plank, Erwin Steinegger, Walter Steinegger, Toni Wieser, Karl Wilhelm, Heinz Winkler |
| Canada | Jeremy Baig |
| Finland | Aulis Kallakorpi, Eino Kirjonen, Esko Mömme, Matti Pietikäinen |
| Norway | Arnfin Bergman, Olaf Bjørnstad, Arne Ellingsen |
| Sweden | Toivo Lauren, Axel-Hermann Nilsson |
| Switzerland | Gottfried Brügger, Andreas Däscher, Fritz Schneider |
| Yugoslavia | Rude Finžgar, Jože Langus, Albin Rogelj |

== Results ==
=== Oberstdorf ===
(Germany) Schattenbergschanze, Oberstdorf
31 December 1953

| Rank | Name | Points |
|---|---|---|
| 1 | (Norway) Olaf Bjørnstad | 222.0 |
| 2 | (Austria) Sepp Bradl | 220.5 |
| 3 | (Finland) Aulis Kallakorpi | 216.0 |
| 4 | (Norway) Arne Ellingsen | 215.5 |
| 5 | (Socialist Federal Republic of Yugoslavia) Albin Rogelj | 207.0 |
| 6 | (Finland) Eino Kirjonen | 206.0 |
| 7 | (Germany) Franz Dengg | 204.0 |
| 8 | (Germany) Franz Eder | 202.0 |
| 9 | (Germany) Toni Brutscher | 201.0 |
| 9 | (Sweden) Axel-Hermann Nilsson | 201.0 |

=== Garmisch-Partenkirchen ===
(Germany) Große Olympiaschanze, Garmisch-Partenkirchen
01 January 1954

| Rank | Name | Points |
|---|---|---|
| 1 | (Norway) Olaf Bjørnstad | 226.0 |
| 2 | (Finland) Eino Kirjonen | 221.5 |
| 3 | (Finland) Esko Mömme | 217.0 |
| 4 | (Norway) Arnfinn Bergmann | 216.5 |
| 5 | (Germany) Franz Eder | 205.5 |
| 6 | (Finland) Aulis Kallakorpi | 204.5 |
| 7 | (Sweden) Toivo Lauren | 197.0 |
| 8 | (Sweden) Axel-Hermann Nilsson | 192.5 |
| 9 | (Germany) Toni Brutscher | 191.5 |
| 9 | (Germany) Sepp Kleisl | 191.5 |

=== Innsbruck ===
(Austria) Bergiselschanze, Innsbruck
03 January 1954

| Rank | Name | Points |
|---|---|---|
| 1 | (Norway) Olaf Bjørnstad | 224.5 |
| 2 | (Finland) Matti Pietikäinen | 223.5 |
| 3 | (Norway) Arnfinn Bergmann | 218.5 |
| 4 | (Norway) Arne Ellingsen | 218.0 |
| 5 | (Finland) Eino Kirjonen | 217.5 |
| 6 | (Austria) Sepp Bradl | 212.5 |
| 7 | (Finland) Esko Mömme | 211.5 |
| 8 | (Finland) Aulis Kallakorpi | 207.5 |
| 9 | (Socialist Federal Republic of Yugoslavia) Albin Rogelj | 206.0 |
| 10 | (Sweden) Axel-Hermann Nilsson | 203.5 |

=== Bischofshofen ===
(Austria) Paul-Ausserleitner-Schanze, Bischofshofen
06 January 1954

After three victories in three events, Olaf Bjørnstad was leading the tournament ranking by 27.5 points ahead of Eino Kirjonen. Defending champion Sepp Bradl was already 51 points behind, but was able to secure the Bischofshofen victory and a third place overall.

| Rank | Name | Points |
|---|---|---|
| 1 | (Austria) Sepp Bradl | 222.5 |
| 2 | (Norway) Arnfinn Bergmann | 218.4 |
| 3 | (Norway) Olaf Bjørnstad | 215.6 |
| 3 | (Finland) Matti Pietikäinen | 215.6 |
| 5 | (Germany) Franz Eder | 213.4 |
| 6 | (Finland) Aulis Kallakorpi | 210.1 |
| 7 | (Germany) Sepp Kleisl | 208.8 |
| 8 | (Sweden) Toivo Lauren | 207.0 |
| 9 | (Finland) Eino Kirjonen | 206.2 |
| 10 | (Norway) Arne Ellingsen | 205.6 |

== Final ranking ==
| Rank | Name | Garmisch-Partenkirchen | Oberstorf | Innsbruck | Bischofshofen | Points |
|---|---|---|---|---|---|---|
| 1 | (Norway) Olaf Bjørnstad | 1st | 1st | 1st | 3rd | 888.1 |
| 2 | (Finland) Eino Kirjonen | 6th | 2nd | 5th | 9th | 851.2 |
| 3 | (Austria) Sepp Bradl | 2nd | 14th | 6th | 1st | 844.0 |
| 4 | (Norway) Arnfinn Bergmann | 21st | 4th | 3rd | 2nd | 840.9 |
| 5 | (Finland) Aulis Kallakorpi | 3rd | 6th | 8th | 6th | 838.1 |
