= 1987–88 Four Hills Tournament =

Ski jumping competition

The 1987-88 Four Hills Tournament took place at the four traditional venues of Oberstdorf, Garmisch-Partenkirchen, Innsbruck and Bischofshofen, located in Germany and Austria, between 30 December 1987 and 6 January 1988.

== Results ==
| Date | Place | Hill | Size | Winner | Second | Third | Ref. |
|---|---|---|---|---|---|---|---|
| 30 Dec 1987 | (West Germany) Oberstdorf | Schattenbergschanze K-115 | LH | (Czechoslovakia) Pavel Ploc | (Finland) Matti Nykänen | (Sweden) Staffan Tällberg | |
| 1 Jan 1988 | (West Germany) Garmisch-Partenkirchen | Große Olympiaschanze K-107 | LH | (Finland) Matti Nykänen | (Sweden) Staffan Tällberg | (East Germany) Jens Weißflog | |
| 4 Jan 1988 | (Austria) Innsbruck | Bergiselschanze K-109 | LH | (Finland) Matti Nykänen | (West Germany) Andreas Bauer | (East Germany) Jens Weißflog | |
| 6 Jan 1988 | (Austria) Bischofshofen | Paul-Ausserleitner-Schanze K-111 | LH | (Finland) Matti Nykänen | (Socialist Federal Republic of Yugoslavia) Primož Ulaga | (Norway) Ole Christian Eidhammer | |

== Overall ==
| Pos | Ski Jumper | Points |
|---|---|---|
| 1 | (Finland) Matti Nykänen | 887.7 |
| 2 | (East Germany) Jens Weißflog | 788.7 |
| 3 | (Czechoslovakia) Jiří Parma | 767.7 |
| 4 | (Switzerland) Christian Hauswirth | 763.5 |
| 5 | (Austria) Franz Wiegele | 752.7 |
| 6 | (Sweden) Staffan Tällberg | 751.5 |
| 7 | (Socialist Federal Republic of Yugoslavia) Miran Tepeš | 748.2 |
| 8 | (West Germany) Andreas Bauer | 741.0 |
| 9 | (Finland) Tuomo Ylipulli | 731.5 |
| 10 | (Finland) Jari Puikkonen | 726.3 |
