= 2007–08 Four Hills Tournament =

Ski jumping competition

The 2007–08 Four Hills Tournament was held in only three of the traditional venues of Oberstdorf, Garmisch-Partenkirchen and Bischofshofen, located in Germany and Austria. The competition at Innsbruck was cancelled due to adverse weather conditions and replaced by an additional visit to Bischofshofen.

Finland's Janne Ahonen won his record fifth overall title after winning the last two events at Bischofshofen, and finishing on the podium in the two others. Overall World Cup leader Thomas Morgenstern of Austria finished second overall, and also claimed the individual win at Oberstdorf. The event at Garmish-Partenkirchen was won by Austrian Gregor Schlierenzauer, who finished 12th overall (he was third overall after three events, but dropped in the standings when he was knocked out in the first round of the last competition).

== Overall standings ==
Rank	Name	Nationality	Total points	Oberstdorf (Rk)	Ga-Pa (Rk)	B'hofen#1 (Rk)	B'hofen#2 (Rk)
1	Janne Ahonen	FIN	1085.8	279.0 (3)	272.7 (2)	282.5 (1)	251.6 (1)
2	Thomas Morgenstern	AUT	1066.0	295.9 (1)	256.0 (9)	271.4 (2)	242.7 (3)
3	Michael Neumayer	GER	994.6	259.5 (7)	258.6 (3)	249.9 (7)	226.9 (10)
4	Adam Małysz	POL	979.9	246.9 (17)	258.6 (5)	244.3 (9)	232.1 (6)
5	Dmitry Vassiliev	RUS	977.5	248.3 (13)	240.2 (13)	257.1 (4)	231.9 (7)
6	Andreas Küttel	SUI	959.3	253.0 (10)	253.2 (7)	244.3 (9)	208.8 (25)
7	Anders Bardal	NOR	958.7	243.4 (18)	245.1 (11)	226.6 (19)	243.6 (2)
8	Martin Schmitt	GER	955.9	252.6 (11)	227.5 (19)	240.1 (11)	235.7 (4)
9	Anders Jacobsen	NOR	943.2	258.3 (8)	233.4 (16)	220.3 (23)	231.2 (8)
10	Janne Happonen	FIN	936.6	252.5 (12)	228.5 (18)	232.1 (14)	223.5 (12)

== Oberstdorf ==
HS137 Schattenbergschanze, Germany
December 30, 2007

Rank	Name	Nationality	1st (m)	2nd (m)	Points	Overall FHT points	Overall WC points (Rank)
1	Thomas Morgenstern	AUT	136.5	141.5	295.9	295.9	760 (1)
2	Gregor Schlierenzauer	AUT	136.0	130.5	280.7	280.7	509 (2)
3	Janne Ahonen	FIN	130.5	137.0	279.0	279.0	335 (4)
4	Tom Hilde	NOR	133.0	132.5	277.9	277.9	330 (5)
5	Simon Ammann	SUI	129.0	131.5	269.9	269.9	218 (9)

== Garmisch-Partenkirchen ==
HS140 Große Olympiaschanze, Germany
January 1, 2008

Rank	Name	Nationality	1st (m)	2nd (m)	Points	Overall FHT points	Overall WC points (Rank)
1	Gregor Schlierenzauer	AUT	132.0	141.0	274.4	555.1 (1)	609 (2)
2	Janne Ahonen	FIN	139.0	135.0	272.7	551.7 (3)	415 (3)
3	Michael Neumayer	GER	131.5	135.5	258.6	518.1 (5)	240 (10)
4	Roman Koudelka	CZE	132.0	132.0	256.7	504.2 (9)	220 (13)
5	Adam Małysz	POL	133.0	131.5	256.6	503.5 (10)	243 (9)

== Bischofshofen (originally scheduled for Innsbruck) ==
HS140 Paul-Ausserleitner-Schanze, Austria
January 5, 2008

Rank	Name	Nationality	1st (m)	2nd (m)	Points	Overall FHT points	Overall WC points (Rank)
1	Janne Ahonen	FIN	139.5	138.0	282.5	834.2 (1)	515 (3)
2	Thomas Morgenstern	AUT	138.0	132.5	271.4	823.3 (2)	880 (1)
3	Simon Ammann	SUI	126.5	139.0	259.4	776.7 (5)	307 (7)
4	Dmitry Vassiliev	RUS	133.0	131.5	257.1	745.6 (10)	132 (16)
5	Gregor Schlierenzauer	AUT	132.5	132.0	256.6	811.7 (3)	654 (2)

== Bischofshofen ==
HS140 Paul-Ausserleitner-Schanze, Austria
January 6, 2008

Janne Ahonen secured his record fifth overall Four Hills title ahead of Thomas Morgenstern, in an event where many of the other top-ranked jumpers (Schlierenzauer, Ammann, Hilde, Loitzl) were knocked out in the first round due to unfavorable wind conditions.

Rank	Name	Nationality	1st (m)	2nd (m)	Points	Overall FHT points	Overall WC points (Rank)
1	Janne Ahonen	FIN	126.0	136.0	251.6	1085.8 (1)	615 (3)
2	Anders Bardal	NOR	132.5	124.5	243.6	958.7 (7)	245 (13)
3	Thomas Morgenstern	AUT	121.0	135.5	242.7	1066.0 (2)	940 (1)
4	Martin Schmitt	GER	121.5	132.5	235.7	955.9 (8)	115 (20)
5	Denis Kornilov	RUS	120.0	132.0	232.6	685.0 (24)	140 (18)

== See also ==
- 2007–08 Ski Jumping World Cup
