= 1998–99 Four Hills Tournament =

Ski jumping competition

Four Hills Tournament at the 1998–99 FIS Ski Jumping World Cup
- Venue: Schattenbergschanze, Große Olympiaschanze, Bergiselschanze, Paul-Ausserleitner-Schanze
- Location: Germany, Austria
- Dates: 30 December 1998 – 6 January 1999

Medalists
gold medal	(Finland) Janne Ahonen
silver medal	(Japan) Noriaki Kasai
bronze medal	(Japan) Hideharu Miyahira

The 1998-99 Four Hills Tournament took place at the four traditional venues of Oberstdorf, Garmisch-Partenkirchen, Innsbruck and Bischofshofen, located in Germany and Austria, between 30 December 1998 and 6 January 1999.

== Results ==
Date	Place	Hill	Size	Winner	Second	Third	Ref.
30 Dec 1998	(Germany) Oberstdorf	Schattenbergschanze K-115	LH	(Germany) Martin Schmitt	(Austria) Andreas Goldberger	(Japan) Noriaki Kasai	
1 Jan 1999	(Germany) Garmisch-Partenkirchen	Große Olympiaschanze K-115	LH	(Germany) Martin Schmitt	(Finland) Janne Ahonen	(Japan) Noriaki Kasai	
3 Jan 1999	(Austria) Innsbruck	Bergiselschanze K-110	LH	(Japan) Noriaki Kasai	(Finland) Janne Ahonen	(Japan) Hideharu Miyahira	
6 Jan 1999	(Austria) Bischofshofen	Paul-Ausserleitner-Schanze K-120	LH	(Austria) Andreas Widhölzl	(Finland) Janne Ahonen	(Japan) Hideharu Miyahira	

== Overall ==
Pos	Ski Jumper	Points
1	(Finland) Janne Ahonen	960.6
2	(Japan) Noriaki Kasai	953.0
3	(Japan) Hideharu Miyahira	916.8
4	(Germany) Martin Schmitt	915.6
5	(Japan) Kazuyoshi Funaki	905.0
6	(Japan) Kazuya Yoshioka	897.5
7	(Austria) Stefan Horngacher	890.7
8	(Japan) Masahiko Harada	882.1
9	(Austria) Andreas Goldberger	871.3
10	(Germany) Dieter Thoma	850.2
