= 1997–98 Four Hills Tournament =

Ski jumping competition

The 1997-98 Four Hills Tournament took place at the four traditional venues of Oberstdorf, Garmisch-Partenkirchen, Innsbruck and Bischofshofen, located in Germany and Austria, between 29 December 1997 and 6 January 1998.

== Results ==
| Date | Place | Hill | Size | Winner | Second | Third | Ref. |
|---|---|---|---|---|---|---|---|
| 29 Dec 1997 | (Germany) Oberstdorf | Schattenbergschanze K-115 | LH | (Japan) Kazuyoshi Funaki | (Japan) Hiroya Saito | (Finland) Ari-Pekka Nikkola | |
| 1 Jan 1998 | (Germany) Garmisch-Partenkirchen | Große Olympiaschanze K-115 | LH | (Japan) Kazuyoshi Funaki | (Japan) Masahiko Harada | (Japan) Hiroya Saito | |
| 4 Jan 1998 | (Austria) Innsbruck | Bergiselschanze K-110 | LH | (Japan) Kazuyoshi Funaki | (Germany) Sven Hannawald | (Finland) Janne Ahonen | |
| 6 Jan 1998 | (Austria) Bischofshofen | Paul-Ausserleitner-Schanze K-120 | LH | (Germany) Sven Hannawald | (Germany) Hansjörg Jäkle | (Finland) Janne Ahonen | |

== Overall ==
| Pos | Ski Jumper | Points |
|---|---|---|
| 1 | (Japan) Kazuyoshi Funaki | 944.0 |
| 2 | (Germany) Sven Hannawald | 912.8 |
| 3 | (Finland) Janne Ahonen | 907.0 |
| 4 | (Austria) Andreas Goldberger | 884.4 |
| 5 | (Finland) Jani Soininen | 863.7 |
| 6 | (Germany) Dieter Thoma | 859.1 |
| 7 | (Austria) Andreas Widhölzl | 831.8 |
| 8 | (Austria) Stefan Horngacher | 808.8 |
| 9 | (Japan) Kazuya Yoshioka | 804.3 |
| 10 | (Japan) Masahiko Harada | 777.9 |
