= 1984–85 Four Hills Tournament =

Ski jumping competition

The 1984-85 Four Hills Tournament took place at the four traditional venues of Oberstdorf, Garmisch-Partenkirchen, Innsbruck and Bischofshofen, located in Germany and Austria, between 30 December 1984 and 6 January 1985.

== Results ==
Date	Place	Hill	Size	Winner	Second	Third	Ref.
30 Dec 1984	(West Germany) Oberstdorf	Schattenbergschanze K-115	LH	(Austria) Ernst Vettori	(Finland) Matti Nykänen	(Austria) Andreas Felder	
1 Jan 1985	(West Germany) Garmisch-Partenkirchen	Große Olympiaschanze K-107	LH	(East Germany) Jens Weißflog	(Finland) Jari Puikkonen	(East Germany) Klaus Ostwald	
4 Jan 1985	(Austria) Innsbruck	Bergiselschanze K-109	LH	(Finland) Matti Nykänen	(East Germany) Jens Weißflog	(Czechoslovakia) Pavel Ploc	
6 Jan 1985	(Austria) Bischofshofen	Paul-Ausserleitner-Schanze K-111	LH	(Norway) Hroar Stjernen	(East Germany) Klaus Ostwald	(Poland) Piotr Fijas	

== Overall ==
Pos	Ski Jumper	Points
1	(East Germany) Jens Weißflog	855.3
2	(Finland) Matti Nykänen	840.6
3	(East Germany) Klaus Ostwald	830.2
4	(Austria) Ernst Vettori	819.3
5	(Czechoslovakia) Pavel Ploc	805.0
6	(Austria) Andreas Felder	803.9
7	(Poland) Piotr Fijas	793.2
8	(Norway) Rolf Åge Berg	788.9
9	(Norway) Hroar Stjernen	784.1
10	(Czechoslovakia) Jiří Parma	781.5
