= Toni Nieminen =

Finnish ski jumper

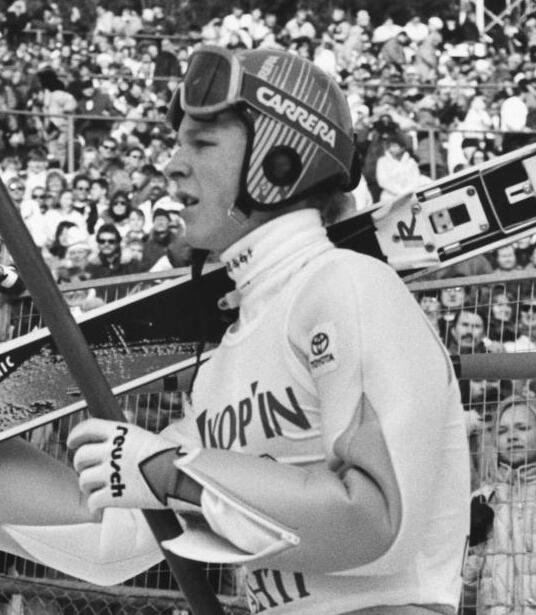

Personal information
- Full name: Toni Markus Nieminen
- Nationality: Finland
- Born: 31 May 1975 (age 51) Lahti, Finland

Sport
- Sport: Skiing

World Cup career
- Seasons: 1991–1999; 2001–2003
- Indiv. starts: 96
- Indiv. podiums: 12
- Indiv. wins: 9
- Team starts: 3
- Team podiums: 3
- Team wins: 1
- Overall titles: 1 (1992)
- Four Hills titles: 1 (1992)

Achievements and titles
- Personal bests: 203 m (666 ft); Planica, 17 Mar 1994
Medal record
Men's ski jumping
Olympic Games
Gold medal – first place	1992 Albertville	Individual LH
Gold medal – first place	1992 Albertville	Team LH
Bronze medal – third place	1992 Albertville	Individual NH
- Updated on 19 June 2017

Toni Markus Nieminen (born 31 May 1975) is a Finnish former ski jumper who competed from 1991 to 2004, with a brief comeback in 2016. He is one of the most successful ski jumpers from Finland, having won both the World Cup overall title and the Four Hills Tournament in 1992, and three medals at the 1992 Winter Olympics. Additionally, he is known for being the first male ski jumper to land a jump surpassing 200 metres (660 ft), which he achieved in 1994 with a world record of 203 m (666 ft) on the ski flying hill in Planica.

== Career ==
Nieminen's biggest success came in his first World Cup season in 1991/92. At the time, the transition from the parallel style to the V-style was taking place and Nieminen was one of the first to master the new technique.

Nieminen took his first World Cup victory in Thunder Bay, in December 1991. Then he went on to win the Four Hills Tournament with 3 victories and one 2nd place. At the 1992 Winter Olympics in Albertville, Nieminen won the large hill and the Team large hill, placing third in the normal hill. In the World Cup, Nieminen took a total of 8 victories securing also the overall title. Additionally, Nieminen won the World Junior Championship in both the Individual and the Team competitions. Nieminen was chosen as the Finnish Sports Personality of the Year 1992.

In the following seasons, Nieminen showed only glimpses of his great talent. In 1994, he became the first ever ski jumper to break the 200 metre barrier at Planica, with a world record of 203 m. Out of his total of 9 individual World Cup victories, only one came after the 1991/92 season, in Kuopio 1995. In World Cup team competitions, Nieminen scored one victory, in Villach 2001.

After retiring from ski jumping in 2004, Nieminen has worked as a sports commentator for Finnish MTV3. He has also competed as a driver in harness racing.

Nieminen made a comeback on 30 January 2016 finishing 17th in normal hill Finnish championship. Nieminen said that his target is to make a comeback to the World Cup.

== World Cup ==
=== Standings ===
Season	Overall	4H	SF	NT	JP
1990/91	—	—	—	N/A	N/A
1991/92	1st place, gold medalist(s)	1st place, gold medalist(s)	—	N/A	N/A
1992/93	50	—	—	N/A	N/A
1993/94	52	—	7	N/A	N/A
1994/95	11	8	31	N/A	N/A
1995/96	93	—	—	N/A	—
1996/97	92	56	—	—	89
1997/98	67	—	—	28	63
1998/99	—	69	—	—	—
2000/01	21	15	37	49	N/A
2001/02	31	33	N/A	—	N/A
2002/03	54	—	N/A	—	N/A

=== Wins ===
No.	Season	Date	Location	Hill	Size
1	1991/92	1 December 1991	(Canada) Thunder Bay	Big Thunder K90	NH
2	1991/92	29 December 1991	(Germany) Oberstdorf	Schattenbergschanze K115	LH
3	1991/92	4 January 1992	(Austria) Innsbruck	Bergiselschanze K109	LH
4	1991/92	6 January 1992	(Austria) Bischofshofen	Paul-Ausserleitner-Schanze K120	LH
5	1991/92	29 February 1992	(Finland) Lahti	Salpausselkä K90	NH
6	1991/92	1 March 1992	(Finland) Lahti	Salpausselkä K114	LH
7	1991/92	11 March 1992	(Norway) Trondheim	Granåsen K120	LH
8	1991/92	15 March 1992	(Norway) Oslo	Holmenkollbakken K110	LH
9	1994/95	1 February 1995	(Finland) Kuopio	Puijo K90 (night)	NH

== Ski jumping world record ==
First standing jump over 200 metres in history.

Date	Hill	Location	Metres	Feet
17 March 1994	Velikanka bratov Gorišek K185	Planica, Slovenia	203	666

Records
Preceded by Martin Höllwarth; 196 m (643 ft)	World's longest ski jump 203 m (666 ft); 17 March 1994 – 18 March 1994	Succeeded by Espen Bredesen; 209 m (686 ft)
