= 1999–2000 Four Hills Tournament =

Ski jumping competition

The 1999–2000 Four Hills Tournament took place at the four traditional venues of Oberstdorf, Garmisch-Partenkirchen, Innsbruck and Bischofshofen, located in Germany and Austria, between 29 December 1999 and 6 January 2000.

== Results ==
Date	Place	Hill	Size	Winner	Second	Third	Ref.
29 Dec 1999	(Germany) Oberstdorf	Schattenbergschanze K-115	LH	(Germany) Martin Schmitt	(Austria) Andreas Goldberger	(Austria) Andreas Widhölzl	
1 Jan 2000	(Germany) Garmisch-Partenkirchen	Große Olympiaschanze K-115	LH	(Austria) Andreas Widhölzl	(Japan) Masahiko Harada	(Finland) Janne Ahonen	
3 Jan 2000	(Austria) Innsbruck	Bergiselschanze K-110	LH	(Austria) Andreas Widhölzl	(Germany) Martin Schmitt	(Finland) Janne Ahonen	
6 Jan 2000	(Austria) Bischofshofen	Paul-Ausserleitner-Schanze K-120	LH	(Austria) Andreas Widhölzl	(Finland) Janne Ahonen	(Germany) Martin Schmitt	

== Overall ==
Pos	Ski Jumper	Points
1	(Austria) Andreas Widhölzl	987.8
2	(Finland) Janne Ahonen	963.5
3	(Germany) Martin Schmitt	960.5
4	(Germany) Sven Hannawald	944.0
5	(Austria) Andreas Goldberger	930.9
6	(Japan) Masahiko Harada	902.9
7	(Japan) Hideharu Miyahira	896.6
8	(Norway) Lasse Ottesen	883.8
9	(Finland) Ville Kantee	882.4
10	(Finland) Jani Soininen	870.8
