= 1988–89 Four Hills Tournament =

Ski jumping competition

The 1988-89 Four Hills Tournament took place at the four traditional venues of Oberstdorf, Garmisch-Partenkirchen, Innsbruck and Bischofshofen, located in Germany and Austria, between 30 December 1988 and 6 January 1989.

== Results ==
| Date | Place | Hill | Size | Winner | Second | Third | Ref. |
|---|---|---|---|---|---|---|---|
| 30 Dec 1988 | (West Germany) Oberstdorf | Schattenbergschanze K-115 | LH | (West Germany) Dieter Thoma | (Finland) Risto Laakkonen | (Finland) Matti Nykänen | |
| 1 Jan 1989 | (West Germany) Garmisch-Partenkirchen | Große Olympiaschanze K-107 | LH | (Finland) Matti Nykänen | (East Germany) Jens Weißflog | (Finland) Risto Laakkonen | |
| 4 Jan 1989 | (Austria) Innsbruck | Bergiselschanze K-109 | LH | (Sweden) Jan Boklöv | (Finland) Ari-Pekka Nikkola | (East Germany) Jens Weißflog | |
| 6 Jan 1989 | (Austria) Bischofshofen | Paul-Ausserleitner-Schanze K-111 | LH | (United States) Mike Holland | (Finland) Ari-Pekka Nikkola | (Sweden) Jan Boklöv | |

== Overall ==
| Pos | Ski Jumper | Points |
|---|---|---|
| 1 | (Finland) Risto Laakkonen | 841.0 |
| 2 | (Finland) Matti Nykänen | 838.5 |
| 2 | (East Germany) Jens Weißflog | 838.5 |
| 4 | (West Germany) Dieter Thoma | 836.0 |
| 5 | (Sweden) Jan Boklöv | 833.5 |
| 6 | (Norway) Jon Inge Kjørum | 831.0 |
| 7 | (Austria) Ernst Vettori | 821.0 |
| 8 | (United States) Mike Holland | 802.5 |
| 9 | (West Germany) Thomas Klauser | 792.0 |
| 10 | (Norway) Ole Gunnar Fidjestøl | 790.5 |
