= Erkki Pukka =

Finnish ski jumper

Erkki Pukka (born 22 May 1940) is a Finnish former ski jumper who competed from 1964 to 1967. His lone victory was at Garmisch-Partenkirchen during the 1964-65 Four Hills Tournament.
