= Ski jumping at the 1992 Winter Olympics =

Ski jumping at the XVI Olympic Winter Games
- Pictogram for ski jumping
- Venue: Tremplin du Praz
- Dates: February 9–16, 1992
- No. of events: 3
- Competitors: 63 from 17 nations

Ski jumping at the 1992 Winter Olympics consisted of three events held from 9 February to 16 February, taking place at Tremplin du Praz.

== Medal summary ==
=== Medal table ===
Rank	Nation	Gold	Silver	Bronze	Total
1	Finland	2	0	1	3
2	Austria	1	3	1	5
3	Czechoslovakia	0	0	1	1
Totals (3 entries)		3	3	3	9

Finland led the medal table with two golds, while Austria won the most medals with five, including sweeping the silver medals.

=== Events ===
Event	Gold		Silver		Bronze	
Normal hill individual	Ernst Vettori; Austria	222.8	Martin Höllwarth; Austria	218.1	Toni Nieminen; Finland	217.0
Large hill individual	Toni Nieminen; Finland	239.5	Martin Höllwarth; Austria	227.3	Heinz Kuttin; Austria	214.8
Large hill team	Finland; Ari-Pekka Nikkola; Mika Laitinen; Risto Laakkonen; Toni Nieminen	644.4	Austria; Heinz Kuttin; Ernst Vettori; Martin Höllwarth; Andreas Felder	642.9	Czechoslovakia; Tomáš Goder; František Jež; Jaroslav Sakala; Jiří Parma	620.1

== Participating NOCs ==
Seventeen nations participated in ski jumping at the Albertville Games. Slovenia and the Unified Team made their Olympic ski jumping debuts.

- Austria (4)
- Bulgaria (3)
- Canada (3)
- Unified Team (4)
- Finland (4)
- France (4)
- Germany (5)
- Italy (3)
- Japan (4)
- Norway (5)
- Poland (1)
- Romania (1)
- Slovenia (5)
- Switzerland (4)
- Sweden (5)
- Czechoslovakia (4)
- United States (4)
