= 2014–15 Four Hills Tournament =

Ski jumping competition

Four Hills Tournament at the 2014–15 FIS Ski Jumping World Cup
- Venue: Schattenbergschanze, Große Olympiaschanze, Bergiselschanze, Paul-Ausserleitner-Schanze
- Location: Austria, Germany
- Dates: 29 December 2014 – 6 January 2015

Medalists
gold medal	(Austria) Stefan Kraft
silver medal	(Austria) Michael Hayböck
bronze medal	(Slovenia) Peter Prevc

The 2014-15 Four Hills Tournament took place at the four traditional venues of Oberstdorf, Garmisch-Partenkirchen, Innsbruck, and Bischofshofen, located in Germany and Austria, between 29 December 2014 and 6 January 2015.

== Results ==
=== Oberstdorf ===
HS 137 Schattenbergschanze, Germany
29 December 2014

Rank	Name	Nationality	Jump 1 (m)	Jump 2 (m)	Points
1	Stefan Kraft	Austria	136.5	129.0	291.9
2	Michael Hayböck	Austria	137.5	132.5	285.0
3	Peter Prevc	Slovenia	139.5	125.5	283.9
4	Kamil Stoch	Poland	129.0	131.0	274.9
5	Andreas Kofler	Austria	135.5	126.0	274.8
6	Anders Fannemel	Norway	128.5	131.0	270.7
7	Roman Koudelka	Czech Republic	131.0	127.0	265.3
8	Noriaki Kasai	Japan	137.5	123.0	264.3
9	Jernej Damjan	Slovenia	126.5	130.5	262.5
9	Daiki Itō	Japan	128.0	128.0	262.5

=== Garmisch-Partenkirchen ===
HS 140 Große Olympiaschanze, Germany
1 January 2015

Rank	Name	Nationality	Jump 1 (m)	Jump 2 (m)	Points
1	Anders Jacobsen	Norway	135.5	136.5	286.0
2	Simon Ammann	Switzerland	138.0	133.0	279.4
3	Peter Prevc	Slovenia	136.5	136.0	276.9
4	Gregor Schlierenzauer	Austria	132.5	139.5	275.7
5	Rune Velta	Norway	134.0	136.5	272.7
6	Stefan Kraft	Austria	132.0	135.0	270.0
7	Michael Hayböck	Austria	134.0	138.0	269.8
8	Noriaki Kasai	Japan	133.5	137.5	269.7
9	Richard Freitag	Germany	127.0	134.5	261.8
10	Severin Freund	Germany	127.5	135.5	260.2

=== Innsbruck ===
HS 130 Bergiselschanze, Austria
4 January 2015

Rank	Name	Nationality	Jump 1 (m)	Jump 2 (m)	Points
1	Richard Freitag	Germany	133.5	132.0	278.5
2	Stefan Kraft	Austria	137.0	127.0	273.5
3	Simon Ammann	Switzerland	132.0	130.5	263.7
3	Noriaki Kasai	Japan	128.5	132.0	263.7
5	Gregor Schlierenzauer	Austria	127.0	129.5	262.4
6	Michael Hayböck	Austria	125.0	138.0	257.5
7	Kamil Stoch	Poland	127.0	130.0	252.8
8	Severin Freund	Germany	131.0	126.5	249.4
9	Anders Jacobsen	Norway	133.5	124.0	248.8
10	Roman Koudelka	Czech Republic	124.0	125.5	248.6

=== Bischofshofen ===
HS 140 Paul-Ausserleitner-Schanze, Austria
6 January 2015

Rank	Name	Nationality	Jump 1 (m)	Jump 2 (m)	Points
1	Michael Hayböck	Austria	137.5	136.5	288.4
2	Noriaki Kasai	Japan	132.5	137.0	277.1
3	Stefan Kraft	Austria	133.5	132.0	271.3
4	Peter Prevc	Slovenia	133.0	134.5	271.2
5	Anders Jacobsen	Norway	130.5	136.0	270.6
6	Richard Freitag	Germany	129.5	133.5	265.1
7	Gregor Schlierenzauer	Austria	132.0	130.0	264.6
8	Severin Freund	Germany	131.0	128.5	257.9
9	Anders Fannemel	Norway	130.0	127.0	248.4
10	Simon Ammann	Switzerland	130.5	136.0	246.7

== Overall standings ==
The final standings after all four events:

Rank	Name	Nationality	Oberstdorf	Garmisch- Partenkirchen	Innsbruck	Bischofshofen	Total Points
1st place, gold medalist(s)	Stefan Kraft	Austria	291.9 (1)	270.0 (6)	273.5 (2)	271.3 (3)	1,106.7
2nd place, silver medalist(s)	Michael Hayböck	Austria	285.0 (2)	269.8 (7)	257.5 (6)	288.4 (1)	1,100.7
3rd place, bronze medalist(s)	Peter Prevc	Slovenia	283.9 (3)	276.9 (3)	245.2 (11)	271.2 (4)	1,077.2
4	Noriaki Kasai	Japan	264.3 (8)	269.7 (8)	263.7 (3)	277.1 (2)	1,074.8
5	Anders Jacobsen	Norway	254.7 (14)	286.0 (1)	248.8 (9)	270.6 (5)	1,060.1
6	Richard Freitag	Germany	251.4 (15)	261.8 (9)	278.5 (1)	265.1 (6)	1,056.8
7	Gregor Schlierenzauer	Austria	247.5 (17)	275.7 (4)	262.4 (5)	264.6 (7)	1,050.2
8	Severin Freund	Germany	255.0 (13)	260.2 (10)	249.4 (8)	257.9 (8)	1,022.5
9	Roman Koudelka	Czech Republic	265.3 (7)	257.1 (11)	248.6 (10)	242.4 (13)	1,013.4
10	Kamil Stoch	Poland	274.9 (4)	243.8 (15)	252.8 (7)	237.9 (15)	1,009.4
