= Daniel Tschofenig =

Austrian ski jumper (born 2002)

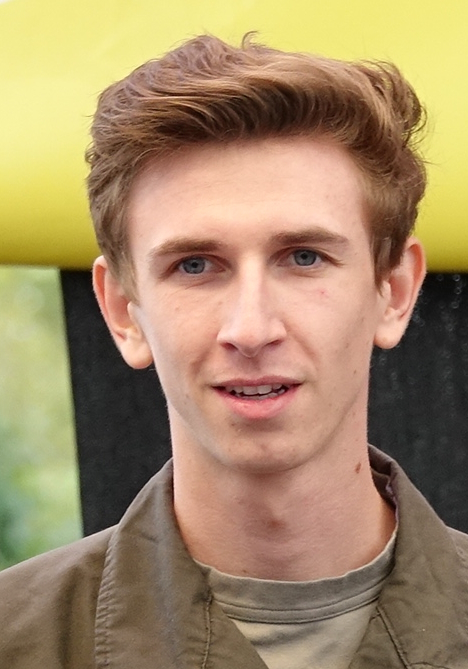
- Tschofenig in 2023 at the Tag des Sports event in Vienna

Personal information
- Nationality: Austria
- Born: 28 March 2002 (age 24) Villach, Austria

Sport
- Sport: Skiing
- Club: SV Achomitz-Zahomc

World Cup career
- Seasons: 2021–present
- Indiv. starts: 116
- Indiv. podiums: 21
- Indiv. wins: 9
- Team starts: 15
- Team podiums: 14
- Team wins: 6
- Overall titles: 1 (2025)
- Four Hills titles: 1 (2025)

Achievements and titles
- Personal bests: 239 m (784 ft); Planica, 30 March 2025
Medal record
Representing Austria
Men's ski jumping
World Championships
Silver medal – second place	2025 Trondheim	Team LH
Bronze medal – third place	2023 Planica	Team LH
Junior World Championships
Gold medal – first place	2021 Lahti	Team NH
Gold medal – first place	2022 Zakopane	Individual NH
Gold medal – first place	2022 Zakopane	Team NH
Gold medal – first place	2022 Zakopane	Mixed Team NH
- Updated on 30 March 2025

Daniel Tschofenig (Slovenian: Daniel Čofenik; born 28 March 2002) is a ski jumper from Austria.

He is a member of the Slovenian minority in Austria. He became the first ski jumper born in the 21st century to stand on a World Cup podium, win a competition, triumph in the Four Hills Tournament and win the World Cup overall.

== Career ==
=== Juniors ===
Tschofenig participated at the 2021 Junior World Championships in Lahti, Finland and finished at the fourth place in individual normall hill competition, and won the gold medal at the team event.

On the next year Tschofenig won three gold medals (individual, team and mixed team) at the 2022 Junior World Championships in Zakopane, Poland.

=== Seniors ===
His debut in the FIS Ski Jumping World Cup took place in January 2021 in Bischofshofen. As of 2025, he has more than 20 podiums in the World Cup, including an individual win in Wisła and several wins with the Austrian team. He also finished 3rd at the FIS Nordic World Ski Championships 2023 – Men's team large hill and was the overall winner of the 2024/25 World Cup season.

== World Cup ==
=== Season standings ===
Season	Overall	4H	SF	RA
2020/21	51	50	—	—
2021/22	25	18	20	—
2022/23	9	8	10	5
2023/24	11	13	11	7
2024/25	1st place, gold medalist(s)	1st place, gold medalist(s)	6	11

=== Wins ===
No.	Season	Date	Location	Hill	Size
1	2024/25	7 December 2024	(Poland) Wisła	Malinka HS134	LH
2	2024/25	22 December 2024	(Switzerland) Engelberg	Gross-Titlis HS140	LH
3	2024/25	1 January 2025	(Germany) Garmisch-Pa	Olympiaschanze HS142	LH
4	2024/25	6 January 2025	(Austria) Bischofshofen	Paul-Ausserleitner HS142	LH
5	2024/25	19 January 2025	(Poland) Zakopane	Wielka Krokiew HS140	LH
6	2024/25	1 February 2025	(Germany) Willingen	Mühlenkopfschanze HS147	LH
7	2024/25	2 February 2025	(Germany) Willingen	Mühlenkopfschanze HS147	LH
8	2024/25	9 February 2025	(United States) Lake Placid	MacKenzie Intervale HS128	LH
9	2025/26	22 November 2025	(Norway) Lillehammer	Lysgårdsbakken HS140	LH
10	2025/26	6 January 2026	(Austria) Bischofshofen	Paul-Ausserleitner HS142	LH
11	2025/26	7 March 2026	(Finland) Lahti	Salpausselkä HS130	LH

=== Individual starts ===
winner (1); second (2); third (3); did not compete (–); failed to qualify (q); disqualified (DQ); not permitted to start (NPS)
Season	1	2	3	4	5	6	7	8	9	10	11	12	13	14	15	16	17	18	19	20	21	22	23	24	25	26	27	28	29	30	31	32	Points
2020–21	Wisła	Ruka	Ruka	Nizhny Tagil	Nizhny Tagil	Engelberg	Engelberg	Oberstdorf	Garmisch-Partenkirchen	Innsbruck	Bischofshofen	Titisee-Neustadt	Titisee-Neustadt	Zakopane	Lahti	Willingen	Willingen	Klingenthal	Klingenthal	Szczyrk	Szczyrk	Râșnov	Planica	Planica	Planica								30
2020–21	–	–	–	–	–	–	–	–	–	–	30	–	–	–	–	–	–	–	–	–	–	9	–	–	–								30
2021–22	Nizhny Tagil	Nizhny Tagil	Ruka	Ruka	Wisła	Klingenthal	Klingenthal	Engelberg	Engelberg	Oberstdorf	Garmisch-Partenkirchen	Bischofshofen	Bischofshofen	Bischofshofen	Zakopane	Titisee-Neustadt	Titisee-Neustadt	Willingen	Willingen	Lahti	Lahti	Lillehammer	Oslo	Oslo	Oberstdorf	Oberstdorf	Planica	Planica					251
2021–22	40	40	24	21	23	38	36	17	10	21	18	40	19	10	5	19	23	–	–	31	17	–	–	–	23	20	14	22					251
2022–23	Wisła	Wisła	Ruka	Ruka	Titisee-Neustadt	Titisee-Neustadt	Engelberg	Engelberg	Oberstdorf	Garmisch-Partenkirchen	Innsbruck	Bischofshofen	Zakopane	Sapporo	Sapporo	Sapporo	Bad Mitterndorf	Bad Mitterndorf	Willingen	Willingen	Lake Placid, New York	Lake Placid, New York	Râșnov	Oslo	Oslo	Lillehammer	Lillehammer	Vikersund	Vikersund	Lahti	Planica	Planica	851
2022–23	6	24	12	8	23	33	17	17	8	7	8	18	9	16	5	7	–	–	28	14	3	8	–	14	5	4	3	3	9	4	9	12	851
2023–24	Ruka	Ruka	Lillehammer	Lillehammer	Klingenthal	Klingenthal	Engelberg	Engelberg	Oberstdorf	Garmisch-Partenkirchen	Innsbruck	Bischofshofen	Wisła	Zakopane	Willingen	Willingen	Lake Placid, New York	Lake Placid, New York	Sapporo	Sapporo	Oberstdorf	Oberstdorf	Lahti	Lahti	Oslo	Oslo	Trondheim	Trondheim	Vikersund	Vikersund	Planica	Planica	747
2023–24	5	7	3	13	19	16	NPS	21	20	18	8	17	–	–	6	4	23	16	5	11	22	15	7	46	31	15	14	2	6	14	6	11	747
2024–25	Lillehammer	Lillehammer	Ruka	Ruka	Wisła	Wisła	Titisee-Neustadt	Titisee-Neustadt	Engelberg	Engelberg	Oberstdorf	Garmisch-Partenkirchen	Innsbruck	Bischofshofen	Zakopane	Oberstdorf	Oberstdorf	Willingen	Willingen	Lake Placid	Lake Placid	Sapporo	Sapporo	Oslo	Vikersund	Vikersund	Lahti	Planica	Planica				1,805
2024–25	2	3	6	4	1	4	3	15	2	1	3	1	3	1	1	4	6	1	1	3	1	4	4	9	14	15	7	4	4				1,805
2025–26	Lillehammer	Lillehammer	Falun	Falun	Ruka	Wisła	Wisła	Klingenthal	Klingenthal	Engelberg	Engelberg	Oberstdorf	Garmisch-Partenkirchen	Innsbruck	Bischofshofen	Zakopane	Sapporo	Sapporo	Willingen	Willingen	Bad Mitterndorf	Bad Mitterndorf	Lahti	Lahti	Oslo	Oslo	Vikersund	Vikersund	Planica	Planica			999
2025–26	1	7	6	4	12	6	13	13	18	16		2	9	6	1		8	3	10	12	4	11	2	1									999

== Personal life ==
Tschofenig is in a relationship with fellow ski jumper Alexandria Loutitt.
