= Olaf B. Bjørnstad =

Norwegian ski jumper

Olaf Bjørn Bjørnstad (10 January 1931 – 12 May 2013) was a Norwegian ski jumper.

He won the second Four Hills Tournament (1953/1954), by winning in Oberstdorf, Garmisch-Partenkirchen Photo of Olaf B Bjornstad Ski Jumping in Garmisch Partenkirchen, Germany and Innsbruck, and finishing 3rd in Bischofshofen.

== See also ==
List of combined Four Hills Tournament Winners
