= Risto Laakkonen =

Finnish ski jumper (born 1967)

Personal information
- Full name: Risto Juhani Laakkonen
- Nationality: Finland
- Born: 6 May 1967 (age 59) Kuopio, Finland
- Height: 184 cm (6 ft 0 in)

Sport
- Sport: Skiing

World Cup career
- Seasons: 1986–1992
- Indiv. starts: 70
- Indiv. podiums: 8
- Indiv. wins: 2
- Team starts: 1
- Team podiums: 1
- Four Hills titles: 1 (1989)
Medal record
Men's ski jumping
Representing Finland
Olympic Games
Gold medal – first place	1992 Albertville	Team LH
World Championships
Gold medal – first place	1989 Lahti	Team LH
Silver medal – second place	1991 Val di Fiemme	Team LH
- Updated on 10 February 2016

Risto Juhani Laakkonen (born 6 May 1967) is a Finnish former ski jumper.

== Career ==
He won a gold medal in the team large hill competition at the 1992 Winter Olympics in Albertville.

His biggest successes were at the FIS Nordic World Ski Championships, where he won two medals in the team large hill event (gold: 1989, silver: 1991). At the World Cup level, he won the 1989 Four Hills Tournament without winning a single competition.

== World Cup ==
=== Standings ===
Season	Overall	4H	SF
1985/86	50	—	N/A
1986/87	18	—	N/A
1987/88	47	—	N/A
1988/89	7	1st place, gold medalist(s)	N/A
1989/90	11	6	N/A
1990/91	19	10	—
1991/92	27	28	—

=== Wins ===
No.	Season	Date	Location	Hill	Size
1	1988/89	4 December 1988	(Canada) Thunder Bay	Big Thunder K120	LH
2	1989/90	4 December 1989	(Canada) Thunder Bay	Big Thunder K90	NH
