= Pentti Kokkonen =

Finnish ski jumper (born 1955)

Medal record

Men's ski jumping

Representing Finland

World Championships
Gold medal – first place	1984 Engelberg	Team large hill
Gold medal – first place	1985 Seefeld	Team large hill
Bronze medal – third place	1982 Oslo	Team large hill

Pentti Kokkonen (born 15 December 1955 in Jämsä) is a Finnish former ski jumper who competed from 1977 to 1986. He won three medals in the team large hill at the FIS Nordic World Ski Championships with two golds (1984, 1985) and one bronze (1982). Kokkonen's best individual finish at the world championships was 5th in the large hill at Lahti in 1978.

At the Winter Olympics, his best finish was fifth in the individual normal hill at Lake Placid, New York, in 1980.

Kokkonen had two individual victories in his career, both in the normal hill in Austria in 1979 as part of the Four Hills Tournament competition for which he emerged as the overall winner.
