= Andreas Widhölzl =

Austrian ski jumper

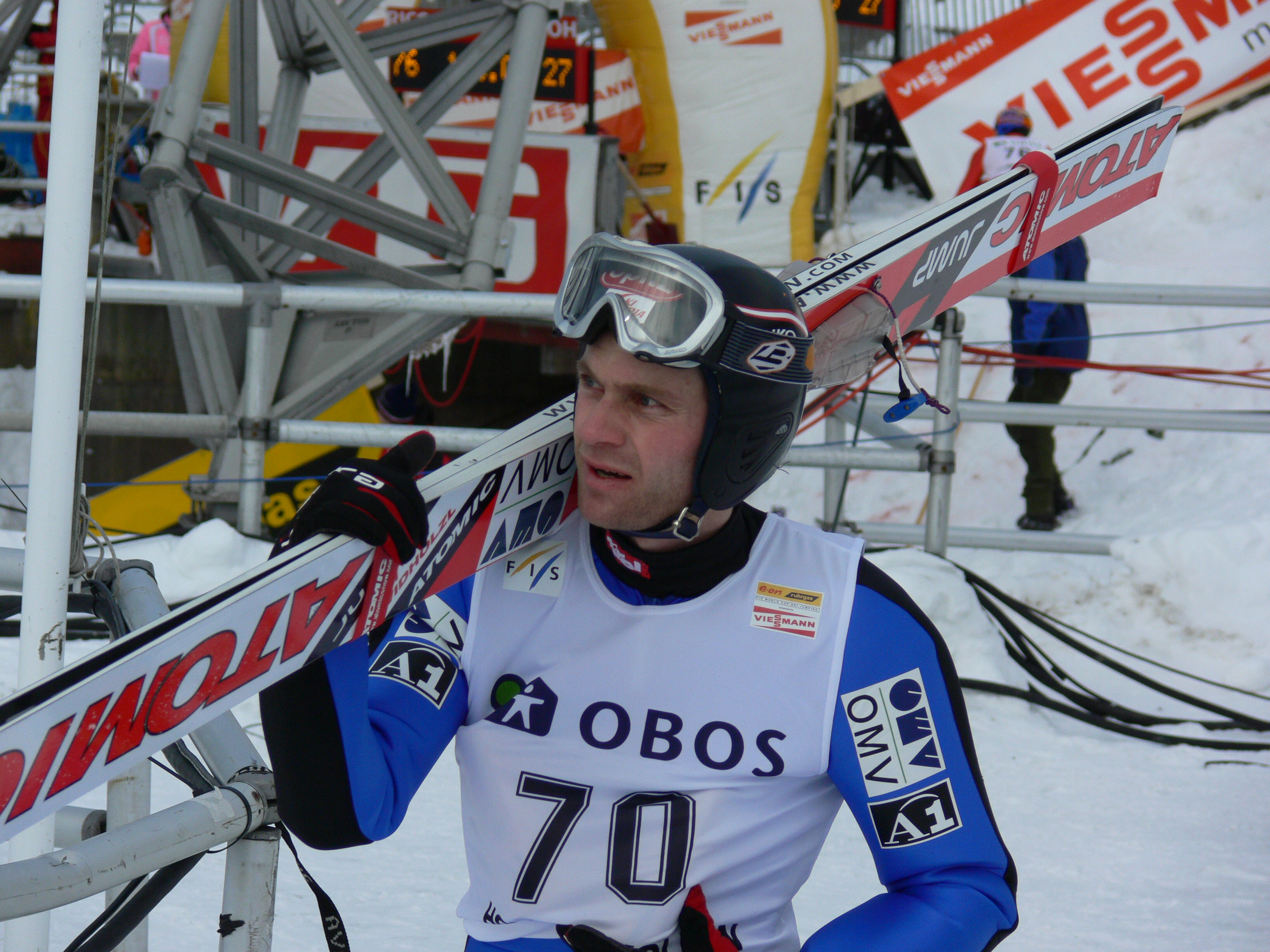
- Widhölzl in Holmenkollen, 2006

Personal information
- Nationality: Austria
- Born: 14 October 1976 (age 49) St. Johann in Tirol, Austria
- Height: 178 cm (5 ft 10 in)

Sport
- Sport: Skiing

World Cup career
- Seasons: 1993; 1995–2007
- Indiv. starts: 288
- Indiv. podiums: 49
- Indiv. wins: 18
- Team starts: 22
- Team podiums: 18
- Team wins: 6
- Four Hills titles: 1 (2000)
- Nordic titles: 1 (1998)

Achievements and titles
- Personal bests: 231 m (758 ft); Planica, 20 March 2005
Medal record
Men's ski jumping
Olympic Games
Gold medal – first place	2006 Turin	Team LH
Bronze medal – third place	1998 Nagano	Individual NH
Bronze medal – third place	1998 Nagano	Team LH
FIS Nordic World Ski Championships
Gold medal – first place	2005 Oberstdorf	Team NH
Gold medal – first place	2005 Oberstdorf	Team LH
Bronze medal – third place	1999 Ramsau	Team LH
Men's ski flying
FIS Ski Flying World Championships
Silver medal – second place	2000 Vikersund	Individual
Silver medal – second place	2006 Bad Mitterndorf	Individual
Bronze medal – third place	2004 Planica	Team
- Updated on 10 February 2016

Andreas "Andi" Widhölzl (born 14 October 1976) is an Austrian former ski jumper.

During his career, he won world championships and Olympic titles.

== Career ==
=== Early years ===
Widhölzl was interested in ski-jumping from an early age, his interest coming from watching the sport on television. At around this time he joined the Tyrolese Ski Federation and learnt to ski. When he was seven years old, a school friend convinced him to join the Fieberbrunner Weitenjäger. After a few years, Widhölzl earned his first success in the district and regional championships for his age group.

=== World Cup debut ===
Widhölzl began his World Cup ski-jumping career in 1993. Between 1997 and 2000, he won two Olympic bronzes and two world championship medals, along with sixteen victories in World Cup events.

=== Four Hills Tournament ===
During this time came his victory in the 1999/2000 Four Hills Tournament. During this season, he came second in the ski-jumping World Cup. In the next five years, he won only one World Cup event, however, in 2005 he twice won the world championship with the Austrian National Team and a year later he was part of the Austrian Team that won the Team Olympic Gold Medal at the Winter Olympics.

=== End of career ===
In March 2008, following health problems, he ended his fifteen-year-long World Cup ski-jumping career.

== World Cup ==
=== Standings ===
Season	Overall	4H	SF	NT	JP
1992/93	—	55	—	N/A	N/A
1994/95	26	18	—	N/A	N/A
1995/96	20	37	16	N/A	21
1996/97	15	14	13	3rd place, bronze medalist(s)	16
1997/98	3rd place, bronze medalist(s)	7	3rd place, bronze medalist(s)	1st place, gold medalist(s)	7
1998/99	7	14	21	40	6
1999/00	2nd place, silver medalist(s)	1st place, gold medalist(s)	5	6	2nd place, silver medalist(s)
2000/01	12	16	28	52	N/A
2001/02	4	5	N/A	21	N/A
2002/03	3rd place, bronze medalist(s)	12	N/A	41	N/A
2003/04	29	17	N/A	—	N/A
2004/05	8	16	N/A	19	N/A
2005/06	10	18	N/A	8	N/A
2006/07	33	22	N/A	34	N/A

=== Wins ===
No.	Season	Date	Location	Hill	Size
1	1996/97	9 March 1997	(Finland) Lahti	Salpausselkä K114	LH
2	1997/98	20 December 1997	(Switzerland) Engelberg	Gross-Titlis-Schanze K120	LH
3	1997/98	5 February 1998	(Japan) Sapporo	Ōkurayama K120	LH
4	1997/98	1 March 1998	(Norway) Vikersund	Vikersundbakken K175	FH
5	1997/98	4 March 1998	(Finland) Kuopio	Puijo K120 (night)	LH
6	1998/99	12 December 1998	(Germany) Oberhof	Hans-Renner-Schanze K120	LH
7	1998/99	6 January 1999	(Austria) Bischofshofen	Paul-Ausserleitner-Schanze K120	LH
8	1999/00	4 December 1999	(Italy) Predazzo	Trampolino dal Ben K120 (night)	LH
9	1999/00	5 December 1999	(Italy) Predazzo	Trampolino dal Ben K120 (night)	LH
10	1999/00	1 January 2000	(Germany) Garmisch-Partenkirchen	Große Olympiaschanze K115	LH
11	1999/00	3 January 2000	(Austria) Innsbruck	Bergiselschanze K110	LH
12	1999/00	6 January 2000	(Austria) Bischofshofen	Paul-Ausserleitner-Schanze K120	LH
13	1999/00	5 February 2000	(Germany) Willingen	Mühlenkopfschanze K120	LH
14	1999/00	6 February 2000	(Germany) Willingen	Mühlenkopfschanze K120	LH
15	2001/02	24 January 2002	(Japan) Hakuba	Hakuba K120	LH
16	2001/02	26 January 2002	(Japan) Sapporo	Ōkurayama K120	LH
17	2002/03	30 November 2002	(Finland) Kuusamo	Rukatunturi K120 (night)	LH
18	2004/05	15 January 2005	(Austria) Tauplitz/Bad Mitterndorf	Kulm HS200	FH

== Invalid ski jumping world record ==
Date	Hill	Location	Metres	Feet
17 March 2005	Letalnica bratov Gorišek HS215	Planica, Slovenia	234.5	769

Not recognized! Crash at world record distance.
