= Paul-Ausserleitner-Schanze =

Ski jumping venue in Austria

Coordinates: 47°24′55″N 13°12′22″E

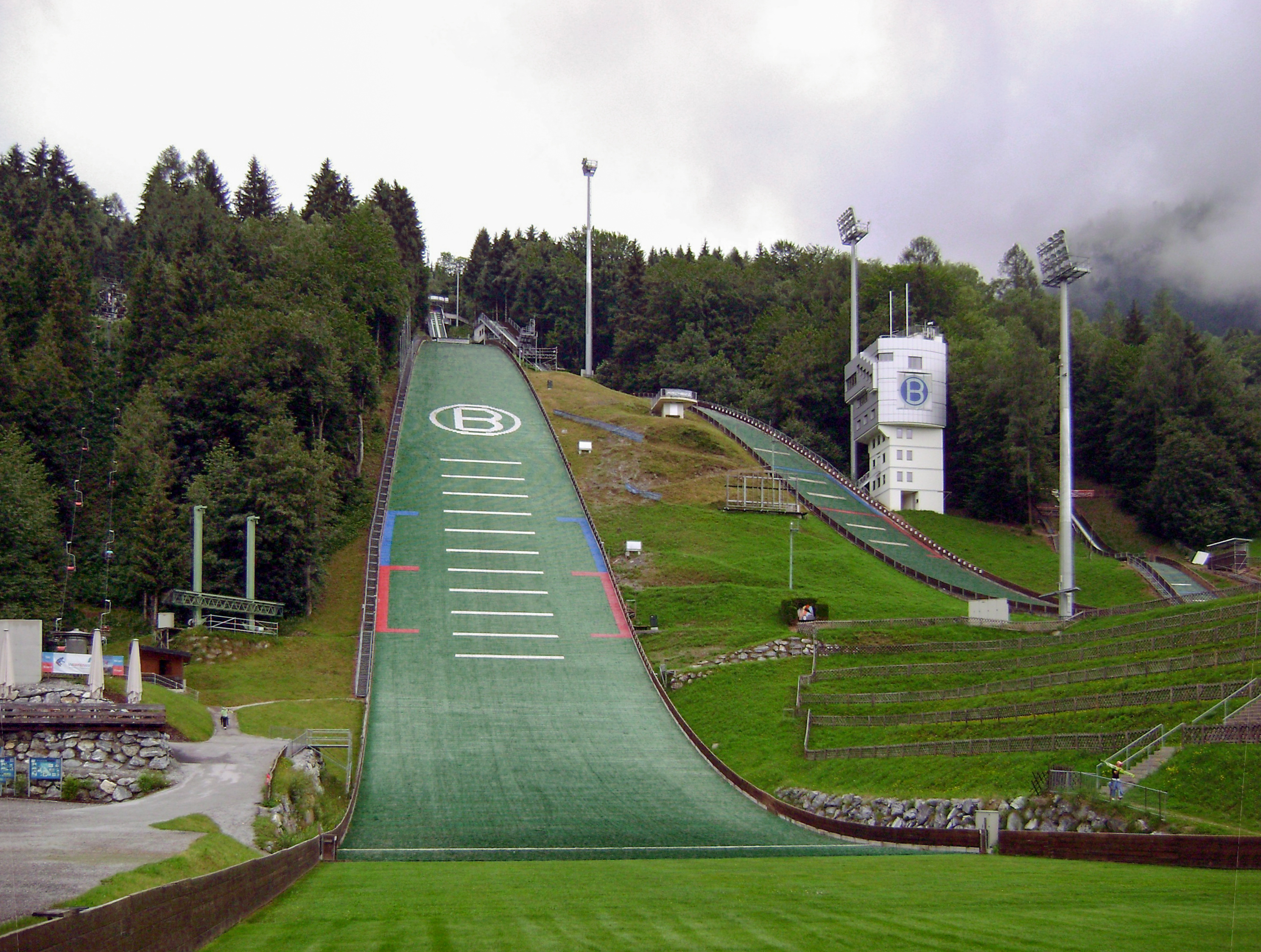
- Location: Bischofshofen; Austria
- Opened: 1943
- Renovated: 2004
- Expanded: 2003 (last)

Size
- K–point: K-125
- Hill size: HS142
- Hill record: (Poland) Dawid Kubacki (145.0 m in 2019)

Top events
- World Championships: 1999

Paul-Ausserleitner-Schanze ("Paul Ausserleitner Hill") is ski jumping hill opened in 1947 as "Hochkönigsschanze", re-built in 2004, and is part of a complex of ski jumping hills located in Bischofshofen, Austria. It is a large hill K-125, and serves as a venue in the FIS Ski jumping World Cup, annually hosting the fourth and final competition of the Four Hills Tournament.

Paul-Ausserleitner-Schanze was renamed after Paul Ausserleitner, an Austrian ski jumper who died from a fall on the hill in January 1952.

== History ==
The first major competition on the hill was the pre-tournament for the 1948 Winter Olympics. The hill was renovated in 1991 and again before the FIS Nordic World Ski Championships 1999, during which it was the venue for the ski jumping competitions from a large hill.
