= 1956–57 Four Hills Tournament =

Ski jumping competition

Four Hills Tournament
- Venues: Schattenbergschanze, Große Olympiaschanze, Bergiselschanze, Paul-Ausserleitner-Schanze
- Location: Germany, Austria
- Dates: 29 December 1956 – 6 January 1957
- Nations: 10

Medalists
gold medal	(Finland) Pentti Uotinen
silver medal	(Finland) Eino Kirjonen
bronze medal	(Germany) Max Bolkart

The fifth edition of the annual Four Hills Tournament in Germany and Austria was won by Pentti Uotinen. Another Finnish athlete, Eino Kirjonen placed second in the overall ranking for the third time. It was the first edition without the winner of the inaugural tournament, Sepp Bradl.

The defending champion, Nikolay Kamenskiy, won the event in Garmisch-Partenkirchen, but had already missed out on producing a competitive result at the first event in Oberstdorf.

== Participating nations and athletes ==
Nation	Athletes
Germany	Helmut Ackermann, Hermann Anwander, Max Bolkart, Toni Brutscher, Willi Fischer, Willy Gotthold, Edi Heilingbrunner, Sepp Hohenleitner, Sepp Kleisl, Hans Kriner, Georg Thoma, Alfred Winkler, Hias Winkler
Austria	Willi Egger, Walter Habersatter, Ferdi Kerber, Lois Leodolter, Otto Leodolter, Alwin Plank, Rudi Schweinberger, Walter Steinegger, Heinz Winkler
Czechoslovakia	Jáchym Bulín, Antonin Chraust, Drahomír Jebavý, Zdeněk Remsa, Mojmír Stuchlík
East Germany	Herbert Arnold, Helmut Döderich, Hugo Fuchs, Harry Glaß, Horst Lesser, Werner Lesser, Harald Pfeffer, Helmut Recknagel
Finland	Aulis Kallakorpi, Eino Kirjonen, Pentti Uotinen
Norway	Toralf Engan, Kjell Kopstad, Arne Larsen, Asbjørn Osnes
Poland	Józef Huczek, Jan Kula, Władysław Tajner, Jakub Węgrzynkiewicz
Soviet Union	Nikolay Kamenskiy, Trjewalery Kandar, Vallary Kandratjew, Yury Moshkin, Nikolai Schamov, Yuri Skofzov, Nikolai Trussow, Koba Zakadze
Sweden	Toivo Lauren, Arne Strøm
Switzerland	Andreas Däscher, Francis Perret

== Results ==
=== Oberstdorf ===
(Germany) Schattenbergschanze, Oberstdorf
29 December 1956

Toni Brutscher placed in the Top Ten in Oberstdorf in each of the first five Four Hills tournaments.

Rank	Name	Points
1	(Finland) Pentti Uotinen	227.0
2	(Finland) Aulis Kallakorpi	223.0
3	(Germany) Toni Brutscher	219.5
3	(East Germany) Werner Lesser	219.5
5	(Switzerland) Andreas Däscher	218.5
6	(Germany) Max Bolkart	217.5
7	(Norway) Kjell Kopstad	215.5
8	(East Germany) Harry Glaß	212.5
9	(Austria) Walter Steinegger	212.0
10	(Sweden) Toivo Lauren	210.5
10	(Norway) Asbjørn Osnes	210.5
10	(Germany) Georg Thoma	210.5

=== Innsbruck ===
(Austria) Bergiselschanze, Innsbruck
30 December 1956

Rank	Name	Points
1	(Soviet Union) Nikolai Schamov	221.5
2	(Soviet Union) Nikolay Kamenskiy	218.5
3	(Germany) Max Bolkart	217.5
4	(Soviet Union) Koba Zakadze	213.5
5	(East Germany) Werner Lesser	213.0
6	(Finland) Eino Kirjonen	212.5
6	(East Germany) Helmut Recknagel	212.5
8	(Finland) Pentti Uotinen	211.5
9	(Czechoslovakia) Zdeněk Remsa	210.5
10	(Finland) Aulis Kallakorpi	209.0

=== Garmisch-Partenkirchen ===
(Germany) Große Olympiaschanze, Garmisch-Partenkirchen
1 January 1957

Rank	Name	Points
1	(Soviet Union) Nikolay Kamenskiy	217.9
2	(Finland) Eino Kirjonen	217.6
3	(Finland) Pentti Uotinen	215.4
4	(Soviet Union) Nikolai Schamov	215.0
5	(Soviet Union) Koba Zakadze	212.3
6	(Soviet Union) Nikolai Trussow	211.8
7	(Germany) Max Bolkart	210.7
8	(East Germany) Harry Glaß	206.4
9	(Norway) Toralf Engan	205.8
10	(Poland) Władysław Tajner	202.5

=== Bischofshofen ===
(Austria) Paul-Ausserleitner-Schanze, Bischofshofen
6 January 1957

After three events, Pentti Uotinen was still in the lead in the overall ranking. His closest pursuer was Max Bolkart, but the German only placed 11th in Bischofshofen (210.2p) and thus stayed behind the Finn. Eino Kirjonen on the other hand, who was fourth after the New Year's event, almost closed the gap by reducing the point difference from 22.3 to 1.5 points.

Rank	Name	Points
1	(Finland) Eino Kirjonen	232.9
2	(Soviet Union) Nikolay Kamenskiy	223.7
3	(Soviet Union) Nikolai Schamov	219.5
4	(Germany) Georg Thoma	217.0
5	(East Germany) Helmut Recknagel	216.9
6	(East Germany) Harry Glaß	216.1
7	(East Germany) Werner Lesser	215.3
8	(Finland) Pentti Uotinen	212.1
9	(Austria) Walter Habersatter	210.9
10	(Austria) Walter Steinegger	210.8

== Final ranking ==
Rank	Name	Oberstdorf	Innsbruck	Garmisch-Partenkirchen	Bischofshofen	Points
1	(Finland) Pentti Uotinen	1st	8th	3rd	8th	866.0
2	(Finland) Eino Kirjonen	17th	6th	2nd	1st	864.5
3	(Germany) Max Bolkart	6th	3rd	7th	11th	855.9
4	(East Germany) Werner Lesser	3rd	5th	11th	7th	848.4
5	(East Germany) Harry Glaß	8th	24th	8th	6th	831.5
6	(Austria) Walter Steinegger	9th	11th	13th	10th	828.2
7	(East Germany) Helmut Recknagel	35th	6th	12th	5th	816.0
8	(Germany) Georg Thoma	10th	25th	18th	4th	815.4
9	(Poland) Władysław Tajner	15th	15th	10th	20th	810.9
10	(Sweden) Toivo Lauren	10th	13th	32nd	18th	794.6
