= 1955–56 Four Hills Tournament =

Ski jumping competition

Four Hills Tournament
- Venues: Schattenbergschanze, Große Olympiaschanze, Bergiselschanze, Paul-Ausserleitner-Schanze
- Location: Germany, Austria
- Dates: 31 December 1955 – 8 January 1956
- Nations: 11

Medalists
gold medal	(Soviet Union) Nikolay Kamenskiy
silver medal	(Austria) Sepp Bradl
bronze medal	(Austria) Rudolf Schweinberger

The fourth edition of the annual Four Hills Tournament in Germany and Austria was the first of its kind to have ski jumpers from the Warsaw Pact zone competing.

The Finnish delegation around defending champion Hemmo Silvennoinen did not compete in the second half of the tournament, even though they had a double-lead at that time. Similarly, the two leaders after the third event (Harry Glaß and Max Bolkart) did not record a competitive score at the final event in Bischofshofen. With many athletes not participating through the entire tournament, the victory fell to Nikolay Kamenskiy even though he did not reach the podium at any of the single events.

== Participating nations and athletes ==
The following athletes are listed on the FIS official record, but it is likely to be incomplete.

Nation	Athletes
Germany	Hermann Anwander, Max Bolkart, Toni Brutscher, Franz Eder, Edi Heilingbrunner, Sepp Hohenleitner, Sepp Kleisl, Toni Landenhammer, Hans Leppert, Ewald Roscher, Georg Thoma, Sepp Weiler
Austria	Sepp Bradl, Rudolf Dietrich, Walter Habersatter, Ferdi Kerber, Lois Leodolter, Otto Leodolter, Alwin Plank, Rudolf Schweinberger, Walter Steinegger
Canada	Jacques Charland
Czechoslovakia	Jáchym Bulín, Zdeněk Remsa, Mojmír Stuchlík, Václav Vašut
East Germany	Helmut Döderich, Harry Glaß, Horst Lesser, Werner Lesser
Finland	Karl Heinonen, Aulis Kallakorpi, Eino Kirjonen, Hemmo Silvennoinen
Norway	Olaf Bjørnstad, Arnfinn Karlstad, Asbjørn Osnes, Sverre Stallvik
Soviet Union	Viktor Afanasjew, Nikolay Kamenskiy, Nikolai Schamov, Yuri Skofzov, Jury Skworzew, Nikolai Trussow, Koba Zakadze
Sweden	Christer Karlsson
Switzerland	Rudi Bertschi, Willi Girard, Francis Perret, Fritz Schneider, Fritz Tschannen
Yugoslavia	Janez Polda

== Results ==
=== Oberstdorf ===
(Germany) Schattenbergschanze, Oberstdorf
31 December 1955

Rank	Name	Points
1	(Finland) Aulis Kallakorpi	224.0
1	(Finland) Eino Kirjonen	224.0
3	(East Germany) Harry Glaß	219.0
4	(Germany) Max Bolkart	216.0
5	(Germany) Toni Brutscher	209.5
5	(East Germany) Werner Lesser	209.5
7	(Soviet Union) Nikolay Kamenskiy	209.0
8	(Norway) Sverre Stallvik	208.5
9	(Germany) Sepp Kleisl	205.0
10	(Austria) Sepp Bradl	204.5

=== Garmisch-Partenkirchen ===
(Germany) Große Olympiaschanze, Garmisch-Partenkirchen
01 January 1956

Rank	Name	Points
1	(Finland) Hemmo Silvennoinen	221.5
2	(Finland) Eino Kirjonen	219.5
3	(East Germany) Harry Glaß	218.8
4	(Soviet Union) Nikolay Kamenskiy	217.0
5	(Norway) Asbjørn Osnes	216.5
6	(Finland) Aulis Kallakorpi	216.0
7	(Germany) Max Bolkart	213.0
7	(Soviet Union) Nikolai Schamov	213.0
9	(Germany) Sepp Weiler	211.5
10	(Austria) Sepp Bradl	208.5
10	(Germany) Georg Thoma	208.5
10	(Germany) Sepp Kleisl	208.5

=== Innsbruck ===
(Austria) Bergiselschanze, Innsbruck
06 January 1956

Rank	Name	Points
1	(Soviet Union) Koba Zakadze	220.0
1	(East Germany) Harry Glaß	220.0
3	(Germany) Max Bolkart	213.5
4	(Soviet Union) Nikolai Schamov	210.0
4	(Socialist Federal Republic of Yugoslavia) Janez Polda	210.0
6	(Soviet Union) Nikolay Kamenskiy	209.5
7	(Germany) Georg Thoma	207.5
8	(Germany) Sepp Kleisl	204.5
9	(East Germany) Werner Lesser	203.0
10	(Austria) Rudolf Schweinberger	202.5

=== Bischofshofen ===
(Austria) Paul-Ausserleitner-Schanze, Bischofshofen
08 January 1956

Rank	Name	Points
1	(Soviet Union) Yuri Skofzov	218.5
2	(Czechoslovakia) Mojmír Stuchlík	215.0
2	(Austria) Rudolf Schweinberger	215.0
4	(Soviet Union) Nikolay Kamenskiy	214.5
5	(Austria) Sepp Bradl	213.0
6	(Soviet Union) Nikolai Schamov	212.5
7	(Czechoslovakia) Jáchym Bulín	210.5
8	(Germany) Franz Eder	209.0
8	(East Germany) Horst Lesser	209.0
10	(Czechoslovakia) Zdeněk Remsa	208.5

== Final ranking ==
Rank	Name	Garmisch-Partenkirchen	Oberstorf	Innsbruck	Bischofshofen	Points
1	(Soviet Union) Nikolay Kamenskiy	7th	4th	6th	4th	850.0
2	(Austria) Sepp Bradl	10th	10th	12th	5th	827.5
3	(Austria) Rudolf Schweinberger	15th	15th	10th	2nd	818.5
