= 1957–58 Four Hills Tournament =

Ski jumping competition

Four Hills Tournament
- Venues: Schattenbergschanze, Große Olympiaschanze, Bergiselschanze, Paul-Ausserleitner-Schanze
- Location: Germany, Austria
- Dates: 29 December 1957 – 6 January 1958
- Nations: 11

Medalists
gold medal	(East Germany) Helmut Recknagel
silver medal	(Soviet Union) Nikolai Schamov
bronze medal	(Soviet Union) Nikolay Kamenskiy

The sixth edition of the annual Four Hills Tournament in Germany and Austria was won by East German athlete Helmut Recknagel, who won on both Austrian hills. It was his first of three tournament victories within four years.

== Participating nations and athletes ==
Nation	Athletes
Germany	Helmut Ackermann, Hermann Anwander, Leopold Bartenschlager, Helmut Bleier, Arthur Bodenmüller, Max Bolkart, Toni Brutscher, Bernd Drexl, Franz Eder, Willy Gotthold, Otto Herz, Toni Hörterer, Hans Kießling, Sepp Kleisl, Helmut Kurz, Toni Landenhammer, Klaus Lechler, Hans Leppert, Ewald Roscher, Konrad Simerl, Georg Thoma, Hias Winkler, Heinrich Zapf
Austria	Willi Egger, Klaus Fichtner, Walter Habersatter, Waldemar Heigenhauser, Ferdi Kerber, Andi Krallinger, Ernst Kröll, Lois Leodolter, Otto Leodolter, Peter Müller, Alwin Plank, Fredi Schirmer, Rudi Schweinberger, Erwin Steinegger, Walter Steinegger, Ferdl Wallner, Ernst Wilhelm, Karl Wilhelm
Canada	Jaques Charland, Claude Dupuis
Czechoslovakia	Jáchym Bulín, František Felix, Jaromír Novlud, Zdeněk Remsa
East Germany	Adolf Baldauf, Manfred Brunner, Hugo Fuchs, Harry Glaß, Werner Lesser, Manfred Münch, Sigmund Papst, Harald Pfeffer, Helmut Recknagel
Italy	Luigi Pennaccio, Nilo Zandanell
Poland	Daniel Gasienica, Józef Huczek, Władysław Tajner
Soviet Union	Rudolf Bykov, Nikolay Kamenskiy, Vallary Kandratjew, Boris Nikolajev, Nikolai Schamov, Koba Zakadze
Sweden	Holger Karlsson, Inger Lindquist, Folke Mikaelsson, Erik Styf
Switzerland	X. Giovannelli, Francis Perret
Yugoslavia	Jože Demšar, Mato Krznačić, Jože Langus, Jože Zidar

== Results ==
=== Oberstdorf ===
(Germany) Schattenbergschanze, Oberstdorf
29 December 1957

Rank	Name	Points
1	(Soviet Union) Nikolay Kamenskiy	227.5
2	(East Germany) Helmut Recknagel	222.0
3	(Austria) Walter Habersatter	216.5
3	(Austria) Walter Steinegger	216.5
5	(East Germany) Werner Lesser	215.5
6	(Czechoslovakia) Jáchym Bulín	211.5
7	(Soviet Union) Nikolai Schamov	210.5
8	(Soviet Union) Rudolf Bykov	210.0
9	(Austria) Otto Leodolter	209.5
10	(Sweden) Folke Mikaelsson	207.0

=== Garmisch-Partenkirchen ===
(Germany) Große Olympiaschanze, Garmisch-Partenkirchen
1 January 1958

Two jumpers who placed on the podium of Oberstdorf only three days prior placed poorly in Garmisch-Partenkirchen, falling back in the overall ranking: Helmut Recknagel finished 35th (189.1p), Walter Habersatter 42nd (183.6p).

Rank	Name	Points
1	(Austria) Willi Egger	226.6
2	(Soviet Union) Nikolai Schamov	223.2
3	(East Germany) Werner Lesser	215.4
4	(Austria) Walter Steinegger	214.4
5	(Soviet Union) Boris Nikolajev	211.8
6	(Germany) Max Bolkart	210.1
7	(Soviet Union) Nikolay Kamenskiy	209.3
8	(Soviet Union) Rudolf Bykov	208.2
9	(Czechoslovakia) Jáchym Bulín	205.9
10	(East Germany) Hugo Fuchs	205.7

=== Innsbruck ===
(Austria) Bergiselschanze, Innsbruck
5 January 1958

Rank	Name	Points
1	(East Germany) Helmut Recknagel	226.5
2	(Soviet Union) Nikolay Kamenskiy	216.5
3	(Austria) Walter Habersatter	216.0
4	(Austria) Otto Leodolter	215.5
5	(East Germany) Harry Glaß	215.0
6	(Germany) Max Bolkart	214.0
7	(Soviet Union) Rudolf Bykov	213.0
7	(East Germany) Werner Lesser	213.0
9	(Soviet Union) Nikolai Schamov	211.0
10	(Austria) Walter Steinegger	207.5

=== Bischofshofen ===
(Austria) Paul-Ausserleitner-Schanze, Bischofshofen
6 January 1958

Leading 8.6 points ahead of Schamov, Nikolay Kamenskiy was in a promising position to become the first ski jumper to win the Four Hills Tournament twice after his success two years prior.

However, Kamenskiy classified in a disappointing 18th place. Helmut Recknagel, who was only fifth in the overall ranking prior to Bischofshofen, won the event and snatched tournament victory.

Rank	Name	Points
1	(East Germany) Helmut Recknagel	227.5
2	(East Germany) Harry Glaß	225.0
3	(Soviet Union) Koba Zakadze	219.2
4	(Austria) Otto Leodolter	218.8
5	(Germany) Max Bolkart	215.8
6	(Soviet Union) Nikolai Schamov	215.6
7	(Austria) Walter Habersatter	215.2
8	(East Germany) Werner Lesser	214.1
9	(Austria) Willi Egger	213.2
10	(East Germany) Manfred Brunner	212.9

== Final ranking ==
Rank	Name	Oberstdorf	Innsbruck	Garmisch-Partenkirchen	Bischofshofen	Points
1	(East Germany) Helmut Recknagel	2nd	35th	1st	1st	865.1
2	(Soviet Union) Nikolai Schamov	7th	2nd	9th	6th	860.3
3	(Soviet Union) Nikolay Kamenskiy	1st	7th	2nd	18th	859.2
4	(East Germany) Werner Lesser	5th	3rd	7th	8th	858.0
5	(Austria) Walter Steinegger	3rd	4th	10th	13th	848.6
6	(Austria) Otto Leodolter	9th	14th	4th	4th	846.6
7	(Germany) Max Bolkart	13th	6th	6th	5th	844.9
8	(Soviet Union) Rudolf Bykov	8th	8th	7th	12th	841.5
9	(Austria) Walter Habersatter	3rd	42nd	3rd	7th	831.3
10	(Sweden) Erik Styf	12th	13th	14th	15th	816.6
