= 1961–62 Four Hills Tournament =

Ski jumping competition

Four Hills Tournament
- Venues: Schattenbergschanze, Bergiselschanze, Große Olympiaschanze, Paul-Ausserleitner-Schanze
- Location: West Germany, Austria
- Dates: 28 December 1960 – 6 January 1961
- Competitors: 85 from 14 nations

Medalists
gold medal	(Finland) Eino Kirjonen
silver medal	(Austria) Willi Egger
bronze medal	(Finland) Hemmo Silvennoinen

Eino Kirjonen became the third Finnish tournament winner at the tenth annual Four Hills Tournament. Against tradition, Innsbruck was the second single event, switching with Garmisch-Partenkirchen, which was held third.

== Participating nations and athletes ==
The teams from Czechoslovakia and East Germany did not participate in Oberstdorf and Garmisch-Partenkirchen for political reasons.

Nation	Number of Athletes	Athletes
West Germany	14	Hermann Anwander, Max Bolkart, Alois Haberstock, Wolfgang Happle, Edi Heilingbrunner, Lothar Heyer, Heini Ihle, Helmut Kurz, Sepp Schiffner, Wolfgang Schüller, Georg Thoma, Helmut Wegscheider, Hias Winkler, Axel Zerlaut
Austria	11	Willi Egger, Walter Habersatter, Willi Köstinger, Otto Leodolter, Sepp Lichtenegger, Horst Moser, Peter Müller, Georg Niederhammer, Baldur Preiml, Walter Steinegger, Ferdl Wallner
Czechoslovakia	3	Zbyněk Hubač, Drahomír Jebavý, Jaromír Novlud
East Germany	7	Dieter Bockeloh, Peter Lesser, Siegbert Münch, Helmut Recknagel, Johannes Riedel, Kurt Schramm, Willi Wirth
Finland	5	Niilo Halonen, Antero Immonen, Veiko Kankkonen, Eino Kirjonen, Hemmo Silvennoinen
France	2	Claude Jean-Prost, Guy Mollier
Hungary	4	László Gellér, János Horváth, Endre Kiss, Tamás Sudár
Italy	5	Giacomo Aimoni, Agosto De Zordo, Bruno De Zordo, Dino De Zordo, Nilo Zandanel
Norway	3	Guttorm Heldahl, Asbjørn Osnes, Oddvar Saga
Poland	9	Stanisław Bobak, Gustaw Bujok, Andrzej Kocyan, Antoni Łaciak, Stanisław Polok, Władysław Tajner, Piotr Wala, Antoni Wieczorek, Ryszard Witke
Soviet Union	6	Rudolf Bykov, Wladimir Bykov, Nikolay Kamenskiy, Yuri Samsonov, Nikolai Schamov, Koba Zakadze
Sweden	6	Bert Andersson, Harry Bergquist, Bengt Eriksson, Holger Karlsson, Inger Lindquist, Kjell Sjöberg
Switzerland	3	Toni Cecchinato, Francis Perret, Ueli Scheidegger
Yugoslavia	7	Peter Eržen, Božo Jemc, Miro Oman, Marjan Pečar, Milan Rojina, Jože Šlibar, Ludvik Zajc

== Results ==
=== Oberstdorf ===
(West Germany) Schattenbergschanze, Oberstdorf
28 December 1961

Rank	Name	Points
1	(Finland) Eino Kirjonen	226.5
2	(Socialist Federal Republic of Yugoslavia) Božo Jemc	219.5
3	(Norway) Oddvar Saga	219.0
4	(Finland) Hemmo Silvennoinen	218.0
5	(Sweden) Holger Karlsson	216.0
6	(West Germany) Wolfgang Happle	215.5
7	(Sweden) Kjell Sjöberg	215.0
7	(Soviet Union) Koba Zakadze	215.0
9	(Soviet Union) Nikolai Schamov	214.0
10	(Soviet Union) Nikolay Kamenskiy	213.0
10	(Sweden) Inger Lindquist	213.0
10	(West Germany) Georg Thoma	213.0

=== Innsbruck ===
(Austria) Bergiselschanze, Innsbruck
30 December 1961

Rank	Name	Points
1	(Austria) Willi Egger	225.0
2	(Soviet Union) Koba Zakadze	219.7
3	(Austria) Walter Habersatter	219.4
4	(Finland) Eino Kirjonen	218.5
5	(Poland) Antoni Wieczorek	214.4
6	(West Germany) Max Bolkart	213.4
7	(Soviet Union) Nikolai Schamov	212.6
8	(Sweden) Kjell Sjöberg	212.5
9	(Finland) Hemmo Silvennoinen	212.2
10	(Soviet Union) Yuri Samsonov	210.1

=== Garmisch-Partenkirchen ===
(West Germany) Große Olympiaschanze, Garmisch-Partenkirchen
01 January 1962

Rank	Name	Points
1	(West Germany) Georg Thoma	225.5
2	(Austria) Willi Egger	221.7
3	(West Germany) Wolfgang Happle	220.0
4	(West Germany) Max Bolkart	216.4
5	(Finland) Eino Kirjonen	216.2
6	(Soviet Union) Nikolay Kamenskiy	215.5
7	(Finland) Niilo Halonen	214.2
7	(Sweden) Inger Lindquist	214.2
9	(Finland) Veiko Kankkonen	213.9
10	(Sweden) Holger Karlsson	212.4

=== Bischofshofen ===
(Austria) Paul-Ausserleitner-Schanze, Bischofshofen
06 January 1962

In the overall lead ever since his dominating victory at the tournament's first event in Oberstdorf, Eino Kirjonen was 19.8 points in the lead before the final. In Bischofshofen, Kirjonen finished 12th. None of his closest pursuers, however, achieved a top result either (Silvennoinen 14th, Lindquist 24th, Schamov 10th). This allowed Bischofshofen victor Willi Egger to jump up from 9th to 2nd place in the overall ranking.

Rank	Name	Points
1	(Austria) Willi Egger	222.7
2	(East Germany) Helmut Recknagel	220.3
3	(West Germany) Wolfgang Happle	215.0
4	(East Germany) Dieter Bockeloh	213.6
5	(East Germany) Peter Lesser	212.8
6	(West Germany) Heini Ihle	210.5
7	(Soviet Union) Koba Zakadze	210.0
8	(Norway) Oddvar Saga	208.8
9	(Poland) Antoni Wieczorek	208.5
10	(Soviet Union) Nikolai Schamov	206.1

== Final ranking ==
Rank	Name	Oberstdorf	Innsbruck	Garmisch-Partenkirchen	Bischofshofen	Points
1	(Finland) Eino Kirjonen	1st	4th	5th	12th	865.1
2	(Austria) Willi Egger	52nd	1st	2nd	1st	853.4
3	(Finland) Hemmo Silvennoinen	4th	9th	12th	14th	843.2
4	(Soviet Union) Nikolai Schamov	9th	7th	9th	4th	840.7
5	(Poland) Antoni Wieczorek	13th	5th	26th	9th	839.4
6	(Austria) Walter Habersatter	23rd	3rd	17th	18th	833.4
7	(Soviet Union) Koba Zakadze	7th	2nd	43rd	7th	833.0
8	(Sweden) Inger Lindquist	10th	13th	7th	24th	832.5
9	(Norway) Oddvar Saga	3rd	27th	21st	8th	830.4
10	(West Germany) Max Bolkart	42nd	6th	4th	11th	828.7
