= 1958–59 Four Hills Tournament =

Ski jumping competition

Four Hills Tournament
- Venues: Schattenbergschanze, Große Olympiaschanze, Bergiselschanze, Paul-Ausserleitner-Schanze
- Location: Germany, Austria
- Dates: 28 December 1958 – 6 January 1959
- Competitors: 60 from 8 nations

Medalists
gold medal	(East Germany) Helmut Recknagel
silver medal	(Austria) Walter Habersatter
bronze medal	(Norway) Arne Hoel

The seventh edition of the annual Four Hills Tournament in Germany and Austria saw Helmut Recknagel of East Germany win three out of four events and become the first ski jumper to defend his title as Four Hills champion. He also set the record for most consecutive hill victories at Four Hills tournaments (five). It was equalized by Sven Hannawald in 2002 and by Kamil Stoch in 2018.

== Participating nations and athletes ==
Nation	Number of Athletes	Athletes
Germany	19	Hermann Anwander, Helmut Bleier, Arthur Bodenmüller, Max Bolkart, Franz Fischer, Wolfgang Happle, Otto Herz, Toni Hörterer, Sepp Kleisl, Helmut Kurz, Hans Leppert, Helmut Reicherts, Ewald Roscher, Konrad Simerl, Georg Thoma, Helmut Wegscheider, Hias Winkler, Hubert Witting, Heinrich Zapf
Austria	14	Alfred Brunner, Willi Egger, Walter Habersatter, Waldemar Heigenhauser, Ferdi Kerber, Ernst Kröll, Lois Leodolter, Otto Leodolter, Horst Moser, Peter Müller, Alwin Plank, Theo Schett, Fredi Schirmer, Walter Steinegger, Ferdl Wallner
Czechoslovakia	2	Miroslav Martinák, Emil Ulrych
Finland	3	Veikko Kankkonen, Eino Kirjonen, Pekka Tirkkonen
East Germany	9	Adolf Baldauf, Manfred Brunner, Hugo Fuchs, Harry Glaß, Werner Lesser, Manfred Matthey, Harald Pfeffer, Helmut Recknagel, Willi Wirth
Italy	3	Dino De Zordo, Luigi Pennaccio, Nilo Zandanell
Norway	3	Arne Hoel, Kjell Kopstad, Anders Woldseth
Soviet Union	7	Rudolf Bykov, Nikolay Kamenskiy, Jaroslav Mazánek, Yuri Samsonov, Vitaly Sannikov, Nikolai Schamov, Koba Zakadze

== Results ==
=== Oberstdorf ===
(Germany) Schattenbergschanze, Oberstdorf
28 December 1958

Rank	Name	Points
1	(East Germany) Helmut Recknagel	226.5
2	(Finland) Eino Kirjonen	222.0
3	(Soviet Union) Nikolai Schamov	221.0
4	(Norway) Anders Woldseth	219.5
5	(Austria) Otto Leodolter	218.0
6	(Finland) Pekka Tirkkonen	217.5
7	(Soviet Union) Nikolay Kamenskiy	216.5
8	(East Germany) Harry Glaß	215.0
9	(Norway) Arne Hoel	214.0
10	(Austria) Willi Egger	212.5

=== Garmisch-Partenkirchen ===
(Germany) Große Olympiaschanze, Garmisch-Partenkirchen
1 January 1959

Rank	Name	Points
1	(East Germany) Helmut Recknagel	225.7
2	(Soviet Union) Koba Zakadze	223.0
3	(Soviet Union) Nikolai Schamov	216.5
4	(Soviet Union) Yuri Samsonov	215.7
5	(Finland) Veikko Kankkonen	215.3
6	(Norway) Kjell Kopstad	213.7
7	(Soviet Union) Nikolay Kamenskiy	213.1
8	(Norway) Arne Hoel	212.2
9	(Finland) Eino Kirjonen	212.1
10	(Austria) Walter Habersatter	211.8

=== Innsbruck ===
(Austria) Bergiselschanze, Innsbruck
4 January 1959

The third place in Innsbruck was the only podium in Anders Woldseth's career before his untimely death later that same year.

Rank	Name	Points
1	(East Germany) Helmut Recknagel	230.0
2	(Finland) Veikko Kankkonen	222.5
3	(Norway) Anders Woldseth	219.5
4	(East Germany) Harry Glaß	217.0
5	(Austria) Walter Habersatter	214.5
6	(Norway) Arne Hoel	214.0
7	(Soviet Union) Nikolai Schamov	212.5
8	(Austria) Willi Egger	212.0
8	(Finland) Pekka Tirkkonen	212.0
10	(Austria) Otto Leodolter	211.5
10	(Soviet Union) Yuri Samsonov	211.5

=== Bischofshofen ===
(Austria) Paul-Ausserleitner-Schanze, Bischofshofen
6 January 1959

After three victories, Helmut Recknagel went into the Bischofshofen event with a comfortable 32.2-point lead. He only finished 15th, but still beat his closest pursuer Schamov, who placed 22nd.

With a home victory, Austrian athlete Walter Habersatter interrupted Recknagel's winning streak and snatched silver in the overall ranking.

Max Bolkart's eighth place was the only Top Ten appearance of a (West) German athlete during this tournament.

Rank	Name	Points
1	(Austria) Walter Habersatter	222.5
2	(Finland) Eino Kirjonen	220.2
3	(Soviet Union) Nikolay Kamenskiy	218.6
4	(Norway) Anders Woldseth	215.0
5	(East Germany) Harry Glaß	214.5
6	(Austria) Walter Steinegger	211.7
7	(Soviet Union) Yuri Samsonov	210.4
8	(Germany) Max Bolkart	210.3
9	(Norway) Arne Hoel	210.2
10	(Soviet Union) Rudolf Bykov	206.9

== Final ranking ==
Rank	Name	Oberstdorf	Garmisch-Partenkirchen	Innsbruck	Bischofshofen	Points
1	(East Germany) Helmut Recknagel	1st	1st	1st	15th	883.2
2	(Austria) Walter Habersatter	11th	10th	5th	1st	860.8
3	(Norway) Arne Hoel	9th	8th	6th	9th	850.4
4	(Soviet Union) Nikolai Schamov	3rd	3rd	7th	22nd	839.7
5	(Soviet Union) Nikolay Kamenskiy	7th	7th	31st	3rd	838.2
6	(Austria) Otto Leodolter	5th	15th	10th	13th	837.6
7	(Norway) Anders Woldseth	4th	34th	3rd	4th	835.2
8	(Soviet Union) Yuri Samsonov	21st	4th	10th	7th	835.1
9	(Soviet Union) Rudolf Bykov	12th	11th	15th	10th	833.9
10	(East Germany) Harry Glaß	8th	31st	4th	5th	831.0
