= Planica 1957 =

Ski flying week competition

Coordinates: 46°28′43″N 13°43′16″E

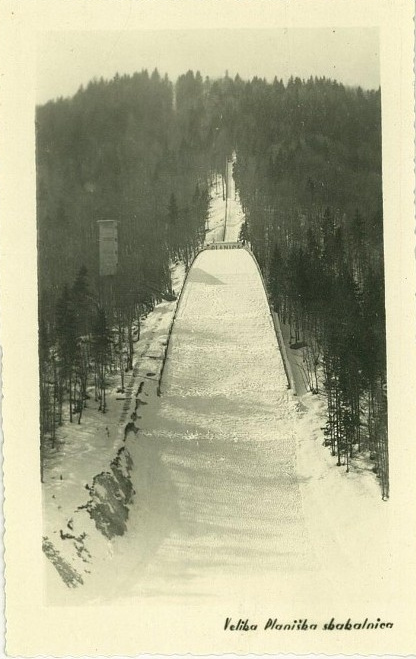
- Host city: Planica, FPR Yugoslavia
- Sport: Ski flying
- Events: International Ski Flying Week
- Main venue: Bloudkova velikanka K120

Planica 1957 was international ski flying week competition, held from 9–10 March 1957 in Planica, PR Slovenia, FPR Yugoslavia. A total of 30,000 people gathered for three days.

== Schedule ==
| Date | Event | Rounds | Longest jump of the day | Visitors |
|---|---|---|---|---|
| 7 March 1957 | Qualification event K80 | 2 | 79.5 metres (261 ft) by Helmut Recknagel | — |
| 8 March 1957 | Training K120 | 3 | 120 metres (394 ft) by Helmut Recknagel | 5,000 |
| 9 March 1957 | International event: day 1 | 4 | 124 metres (407 ft) by Helmut Recknagel | 10,000 |
| 10 March 1957 | International event: day 2 | 4 | 119.5 metres (376 ft) by Helmut Recknagel | 15,000 |

== Competitions ==
On 7 March 1957, first training on Srednja Bloudkova K80 normal hill was on schedule in front of no crowd, which also counted as qualification for the main international event. There were 38 competitors from eight countries performing with no crowd present. Helmut Recknagel won this independent (qualification) event for the main competition with 78.5 and 79.5 metres.

On 8 March 1957, second training, first on Bloudkova velikanka K120 large hill in front of 5,000 people was on schedule, which also counted as qualification for the main international event. In three rounds total of 97 jumps were made that day. Twenty-five jumps were over 100 metres and Helmut Recknagel was the longest with a jump that tied the hill record of 120 metres from 1948 set by Fritz Tschannen. Those were only trial jumps, however they were also graded by judges, if one on next two days of competition would be canceled, then two best jumps from today's training would count into official final results.

On 9 March 1957, first day of competition in three rounds was on schedule, in front of 10,000 people. There were 3 rounds with total of 124 jumps made. Helmut Recknagel set another hill record at 124 metres.

On 10 March 1957, second day of competition in two rounds was on schedule, in front of 15,000 people. Helmut Recknagel who set the longest jump of the day at 119.5 metres again, dominated the whole weekend and won the two day international.

=== Training 1 (qualifications) ===
7 March 1957 – 11:00 am – Srednja Bloudkova K80 – two rounds – incomplete

| Bib | Name | Country | Round 1 | Round 2 | Points |
|---|---|---|---|---|---|
| 1 | Helmut Recknagel | East Germany | 78.5 m | 79.5 m | 219.5 |
| 2 | Eino Kirjonen | Finland | 76 m | 74 m | 216.0 |
| 3 | Max Bolkart | West Germany | 73.5 m | 76 m | 211.5 |
| 4 | Henry Glaß | East Germany | 73 m | 73 m | 208.5 |
| 5 | Pekka Tirkkonen | Finland | 71 m | 74.5 m | 206.0 |
| 6 | Werner Lesser | East Germany | 70.5 m | 74.5 m | 204.5 |
| 7 | Manfred Brunner | East Germany | 70.5 m | 72 m | 204.0 |
| 8 | Walter Steinegger | Austria | 70.5 m | 74 m | 202.5 |
| 9 | Helmut Bleier | West Germany | 72 m | 71 m | 199.5 |
| 10 | Jože Langus | Yugoslavia | 70 m | 71 m | 199.0 |
| 11 | Władysław Tajner | Poland | N/A | N/A | N/A |
| 12 | Peter Müller | Austria | N/A | N/A | N/A |
| 13 | Willi Egger | Austria | N/A | N/A | N/A |
| 14 | Walter Habersatter | Austria | N/A | N/A | N/A |
| 15 | Hermann Anwander | West Germany | N/A | N/A | N/A |
| 16 | Stanisław Gąsienica Daniel | Poland | N/A | N/A | N/A |
| 17 | Aulis Kailakorppi | Finland | N/A | N/A | N/A |
| 18 | Drahomír Jebavý | Czechoslovakia | N/A | N/A | N/A |
| 19 | Mato Krznarič | Yugoslavia | N/A | N/A | N/A |
| 20 | Bine Rogelj | Yugoslavia | N/A | N/A | N/A |
| 21 | Lovro Korenčan | Yugoslavia | N/A | N/A | N/A |
| 22 | Mojmír Stuchlík | Czechoslovakia | N/A | N/A | N/A |
| 23 | Franko | Yugoslavia | N/A | N/A | N/A |
| 24 | Jemc | Yugoslavia | N/A | N/A | N/A |
| 25 | Anton Zapf | West Germany | N/A | N/A | N/A |
| 26 | Miro Oman | Yugoslavia | N/A | N/A | N/A |
| 27 | Albin Adlešič | Yugoslavia | N/A | N/A | N/A |
| 28 | Milan Rojina | Yugoslavia | N/A | N/A | N/A |
| 29 | Lojze Gorjanc | Yugoslavia | N/A | N/A | N/A |
| 30 | Václav Vašut | Czechoslovakia | N/A | N/A | N/A |
| 31 | Otto Leodolter | Austria | N/A | N/A | N/A |
| 32 | Janez Saksida | Yugoslavia | N/A | N/A | N/A |
| 33 | Andrzej Gąsienica Daniel | Poland | N/A | N/A | N/A |
| 34 | Dobritz | West Germany | N/A | N/A | N/A |
| 35 | Janez Matul | Yugoslavia | N/A | N/A | N/A |
| 36 | Josip Šporer | Yugoslavia | N/A | N/A | N/A |
| 37 | Janez Gorišek | Yugoslavia | N/A | N/A | N/A |
.....

=== Training 2 ===
8 March 1957 – Bloudkova velikanka K120 – three rounds

| Bib | Name | Country | Round 1 | Round 2 | Round 3 |
|---|---|---|---|---|---|
| 1 | Mojmír Stuchlík | Czechoslovakia | 85 m | 87.5 m | 87.5 m |
| 2 | Miro Oman | Yugoslavia | 75 m | 84 m | 86 m |
| 3 | Franko | Yugoslavia | 81 m | 96.5 m | 80 m |
| 4 | Anton Zapf | West Germany | 86 m | 96.5 m | 89 m |
| 5 | Otto Leodolter | Austria | 90.5 m | 97 m | 97 m |
| 6 | Manfred Brunner | East Germany | 87.5 m | 93.5 m | 90 m |
| 7 | Walter Habersatter | Austria | 90 m | 99.5 m | 97.5 m |
| 8 | Aulis Kailakorppi | Finland | 80 m | 90.5 m | 94 m |
| 9 | Andrzej Gąsienica Daniel | Poland | 94.5 m | 105.5 m | 100 m |
| 10 | Janez Saksida | Yugoslavia | 78.5 m | 76.5 m | 77 m |
| 11 | Henri Thiolière | France | 73 m | — | — |
| 12 | Milan Rojina | Yugoslavia | 82 m | 87 m | 82 m |
| 13 | Hermann Anwander | West Germany | 87 m | 99.5 m | 97.5 m |
| 14 | Janez Gorišek | Yugoslavia | 82 m | 88 m | 87 m |
| 15 | Helmut Bleier | West Germany | 96.5 m | 105.5 m | 107.5 m |
| 16 | Werner Lesser | East Germany | 97 m | 100.5 m | 101 m |
| 17 | Drahomír Jebavý | Czechoslovakia | 87 m | 87.5 m | 88.5 m |
| 18 | Stanisław Gąsienica Daniel | Poland | 87 m | 91 m | 90.5 m |
| 19 | Willi Egger | Austria | 100.5 m | 95.5 m | 94 m |
| 20 | Richard Rabassa | France | 81.5 m | 80 m | 83.5 m |
| 21 | Lovro Korenčan | Yugoslavia | 85.5 m | 85 m | 85.5 m |
| 22 | Pekka Tirkkonen | Finland | 99 m | 108.5 m | 109 m |
| 23 | Peter Müller | Austria | 90 m | 93 m | 95 m |
| 24 | Bine Rogelj | Yugoslavia | 78 m | 88 m | 86.5 m |
| 25 | Władysław Tajner | Poland | 95 m | 100.5 m | 102.5 m |
| 26 | Henry Glaß | East Germany | 99 m | 105 m | 103 m |
| 27 | Eino Kirjonen | Finland | 99.5 m | 113.5 m | 111.5 m |
| 28 | Max Bolkart | West Germany | 100 m | 100 m | 93 m |
| 29 | Mato Krznarič | Yugoslavia | 88.5 m | 88 m | 86 m |
| 30 | Václav Vašut | Czechoslovakia | 91 m | 93.5 m | 90 m |
| 31 | Jože Langus | Yugoslavia | 108.5 m | 104 m | 100.5 m |
| 32 | Helmut Recknagel | East Germany | 119 m | 120 m | 119.5 m |
| 33 | Walter Steinegger | Austria | 100.5 m | 104 m | 100 m |

=== International Ski Flying Week: Day 1 ===
9 March 1957 – Bloudkova velikanka K120 – four rounds (two best counted)

| Rank | Bib | Name | Country | Round 1 | Round 2 | Round 3 | Round 4 | Points |
|---|---|---|---|---|---|---|---|---|
| 1 | 31 | Helmut Recknagel | East Germany | 124 m | 115 m | 115.5 m | 121.5 m | 230.0 |
| 2 | 20 | Pekka Tirkkonen | Finland | 100 m | 113.5 m | 106.5 m | 118.5 m | 220.3 |
| 3 | 25 | Eino Kirjonen | Finland | 109.5 m | 106.5 m | 105.5 m | 107 m | 216.6 |
| 4 | 27 | Helmut Bleier | West Germany | 104.5 m | 107.5 m | 103 m | 106.5 m | 209.2 |
| 5 | 17 | Henry Glaß | East Germany | 102.5 m | 103 m | 104 m | 93 m | 209.1 |
| 6 | 26 | Jože Langus | Yugoslavia | 98.5 m | 101.5 m | 95 m | 101.5 m | 205.1 |
| 7 | 12 | Werner Lesser | East Germany | 106.5 m | 101 m | 98 m | 101.5 m | 204.3 |
| 8 | 8 | Hermann Anwander | West Germany | 95 m | 93.5 m | 92 m | 93.5 m | 198.7 |
| 9 | 30 | Władysław Tajner | Poland | 101.5 m | 91 m | 104 m | 101 m | 198.0 |
| 10 | 19 | Willi Egger | Austria | 103.5 m | 96 m | 91 m | 97 m | 197.9 |
| 11 | 28 | Walter Steinegger | Austria | 100 m | 86 m | 96.5 m | 103 m | 197.0 |
| | 32 | Jože Zidar | Yugoslavia | 98 m | 97.5 m | 96 m | 98 m | 197.0 |
| 13 | 18 | Max Bolkart | West Germany | 102 m | 97.5 m | 92.5 m | 87 m | 195.0 |
| 14 | 29 | Walter Habersatter | Austria | 101.5 m | 96.5 m | 95.5 m | 97 m | 194.6 |
| 15 | 22 | Andrzej Gąsienica | Poland | 107.5 m | 97.5 m | 99 m | 102.5 m | 193.7 |
| 16 | 4 | Peter Müller | Austria | 100 m | 100 m | 92.5 m | 93 m | 192.4 |
| 17 | 11 | Otto Leodolter | Austria | 102.5 m | 97 m | 96 m | 93 m | 190.5 |
| 18 | 2 | Manfred Brunner | East Germany | 95.5 m | 91.5 m | 89.5 m | 88.5 m | 185.3 |
| 19 | 15 | Aulis Kailakorppi | Finland | 95 m | 87 m | 89 m | 94 m | 185.1 |
| 20 | 10 | Roman Gąsienica | Poland | 94.5 m | 91 m | 95.5 m | 94 m | 184.8 |
| 21 | 9 | Drahomír Jebavý | Czechoslovakia | 89.5 m | 86 m | 86.5 m | 92 m | 179.4 |
| 22 | 5 | Anton Zapf | West Germany | 93 m | 86 m | 86.5 m | 83.5 m | 173.5 |
| 23 | 14 | Milan Rojina | Yugoslavia | 89.5 m | 81 m | 84 m | 81 m | 173.4 |
| 24 | 6 | Franko | Yugoslavia | 89 m | 87 m | 85.5 m | 83 m | 173.2 |
| 25 | 23 | Bine Rogelj | Yugoslavia | 83.5 m | 85 m | 86 m | 86 m | 173.0 |
| 26 | 21 | Janez Gorišek | Yugoslavia | 89.5 m | 85.5 m | 85.5 m | 85.5 m | 172.5 |
| 27 | 3 | Richard Rabassa | France | 90 m | 86 m | 83.5 m | 86.5 m | 167.1 |
| 28 | 13 | Lovro Korenčan | Yugoslavia | 88 m | 82 m | 83.5 m | 88.5 m | 165.6 |
| 29 | 7 | Mojmír Stuchlík | Czechoslovakia | 91 m | 80.5 m | 82 m | 84 m | 163.4 |
| 30 | 1 | Miro Oman | Yugoslavia | 87.5 m | 75 m | 75 m | 83 m | 160.5 |
| 31 | 24 | Mato Krznarič | Yugoslavia | 86 m | 84.5 m | 84.5 m | — | N/A |
| 32 | 16 | Václav Vašut | Czechoslovakia | 91 m | — | — | — | N/A |

Fall or touch!

=== International Ski Flying Week: Day 2 ===
10 March 1957 – Bloudkova velikanka K120 – four rounds (two best counted)

| Rank | Bib | Name | Country | Round 1 | Round 2 | Round 3 | Round 4 | Points |
|---|---|---|---|---|---|---|---|---|
| 1 | 26 | Helmut Recknagel | East Germany | 119.5 m | 123.5 m | 120 m | 123.5 m | 230.9 |
| 2 | 19 | Eino Kirjonen | Finland | 118.5 m | 118 m | 114.5 m | 106 m | 226.0 |
| 3 | 7 | Werner Lesser | East Germany | 105.5 m | 106.5 m | 112 m | 109.5 m | 216.5 |
| 4 | 16 | Henry Glaß | East Germany | 106 m | 105.5 m | 100.5 m | 111 m | 215.3 |
| 5 | 29 | Helmut Bleier | West Germany | 106.5 m | 113.5 m | 114 m | 114 m | 214.2 |
| 6 | 23 | Władysław Tajner | Poland | 103.5 m | 110 m | 114 m | 106 m | 214.1 |
| 7 | 24 | Pekka Tirkkonen | Finland | 114 m | 113.5 m | 111.5 m | 118.5 m | 213.6 |
| 8 | 28 | Jože Zidar | Yugoslavia | 97 m | 98 m | 107.5 m | 108 m | 209.4 |
| 9 | 2 | Otto Leodolter | Austria | 93 m | 99 m | 104 m | 112 m | 209.2 |
| 10 | 25 | Walter Steinegger | Austria | 101 m | 103.5 m | 104.5 m | 105 m | 206.8 |
| 11 | 27 | Willi Egger | Austria | 97 m | 101.5 m | 105.5 m | 99.5 m | 206.1 |
| 12 | 30 | Jože Langus | Yugoslavia | 98 m | 92 m | 103.5 m | 104.5 m | 205.4 |
| 13 | 10 | Aulis Kailakorppi | Finland | 94.5 m | 96.5 m | 102 m | 103 m | 204.1 |
| 14 | 21 | Andrzej Gąsienica | Poland | 108 m | 113.5 m | 112.5 m | — | 204.0 |
| 15 | 22 | Walter Habersatter | Austria | 99 m | 102 m | 108 m | 97.5 m | 201.4 |
| 16 | 15 | Peter Müller | Austria | 97.5 m | 97 m | 98.5 m | 106.5 m | 200.1 |
| 17 | 8 | Hermann Anwander | West Germany | 97 m | 97 m | 101.5 m | 102.5 m | 199.5 |
| 18 | 17 | Max Bolkart | West Germany | 91 m | 95 m | 98.5 m | 98.5 m | 198.3 |
| 19 | 6 | Roman Gąsienica | Poland | 91.5 m | 90.5 m | 96.5 m | 98.5 m | 191.3 |
| 20 | 5 | Manfred Brunner | East Germany | 98 m | 98 m | 101 m | 95.5 m | 190.0 |
| 21 | 3 | Anton Zapf | West Germany | 95 m | 94.5 m | 94 m | 96.5 m | 188.0 |
| 22 | 4 | Miro Oman | Yugoslavia | 84 m | 81.5 m | 92.5 m | 93 m | 181.4 |
| 23 | 12 | Bine Rogelj | Yugoslavia | 84 m | 88.5 m | 82.5 m | 89 m | 179.5 |
| 24 | 11 | Drahomír Jebavý | Czechoslovakia | 84.5 m | 89.5 m | 89 m | 88 m | 177.6 |
| 25 | 13 | Mojmír Stuchlík | Czechoslovakia | 89.5 m | 91 m | 88.5 m | 90.5 m | 177.0 |
| 26 | 20 | Janez Gorišek | Yugoslavia | 86.5 m | 90 m | 89 m | 86.5 m | 176.4 |
| 27 | 1 | Franko | Yugoslavia | 88 m | 79 m | 97.5 m | 82.5 m | 175.8 |
| 28 | 9 | Lovro Korenčan | Yugoslavia | 87 m | 88 m | 89 m | 95 m | 173.3 |
| 29 | 18 | Richard Rabassa | France | 85.5 m | 81 m | 88 m | 94.5 m | 170.8 |
| 30 | 14 | Milan Rojina | Yugoslavia | 83.5 m | 86.5 m | 90.5 m | 89.5 m | 160.9 |

== Official results ==
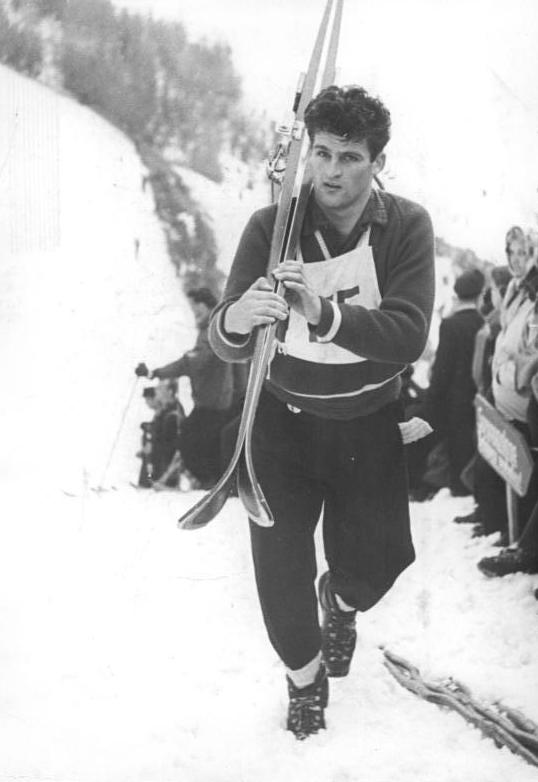
Helmut Recknagel was dominating all four days, won and set two hill records

9–10 March 1957 – Bloudkova velikanka K120 – two best rounds (D1) + two best (D2)

| Rank | Name | Country | 9 March | 10 March | Total |
|---|---|---|---|---|---|
| 1 | Helmut Recknagel | East Germany | 230.0 | 230.9 | 460.9 |
| 2 | Eino Kirjonen | Finland | 216.6 | 226.0 | 242.6 |
| 3 | Pekka Tirkkonen | Finland | 220.3 | 213.6 | 433.9 |
| 4 | Henry Glaß | East Germany | 209.1 | 215.3 | 424.4 |
| 5 | Helmut Bleier | West Germany | 209.2 | 214.2 | 423.4 |
| 6 | Werner Lesser | East Germany | 204.3 | 216.5 | 420.8 |
| 7 | Władysław Tajnerr | Poland | 198.0 | 214.1 | 412.1 |
| 8 | Jože Langus | Yugoslavia | 205.1 | 205.4 | 410.5 |
| 9 | Jože Zidar | Yugoslavia | 197.0 | 209.4 | 406.4 |
| 10 | Willi Egger | Austria | 197.9 | 206.1 | 404.0 |
| 11 | Walter Steinegger | Austria | 197.0 | 206.8 | 403.8 |
| 12 | Otto Leodolter | Austria | 190.5 | 209.2 | 399.7 |
| 13 | Andrzej Gąsienica Daniel | Poland | 193.7 | 204.0 | 397.7 |
| 14 | Walter Habersatter | Austria | 194.6 | 201.4 | 396.0 |
| 15 | Max Bolkart | West Germany | 195.0 | 198.3 | 393.3 |
| 16 | Peter Müller | Austria | 192.4 | 200.1 | 392.5 |
| 17 | Hermann Anwander | West Germany | 188.7 | 199.5 | 389.2 |
| 18 | Aulis Kailakorppi | Finland | 185.1 | 204.1 | 389.2 |
| 19 | Roman Gąsienica Sieczka | Poland | 184.8 | 191.3 | 376.1 |
| 20 | Manfred Brunner | East Germany | 185.3 | 190.0 | 375.3 |
| 21 | Anton Zapf | West Germany | 173.5 | 188.0 | 361.8 |
| 22 | Drahomír Jebavý | Czechoslovakia | 179.4 | 177.6 | 357.0 |
| 23 | Bine Rogelj | Yugoslavia | 173.0 | 179.5 | 352.5 |
| 24 | Franko | Yugoslavia | 173.2 | 175.8 | 349.0 |
| 25 | Janez Gorišek | Yugoslavia | 172.5 | 176.4 | 348.9 |
| 26 | Miro Oman | Yugoslavia | 160.5 | 181.4 | 341.9 |
| 27 | Mojmír Stuchlík | Czechoslovakia | 163.4 | 177.0 | 340.4 |
| 28 | Lovro Korenčan | Yugoslavia | 165.6 | 173.3 | 338.9 |
| 29 | Richard Rabassa | France | 167.1 | 170.8 | 337.9 |
| 30 | Milan Rojina | Yugoslavia | 173.4 | 160.9 | 324.3 |

== Hill dimensions ==
Today, on 8 March 1957, at 10 AM local time, powerful "Fanfares", the second version, written by Slovenian composer Uroš Krek, was played for the first time.

— Slovenski poročevalec (9/3/1957)
- 159 metres - total height difference
- 155 metres - inrun length
- 120 metres - calculation point
- 35° degrees - inrun incline
- 41° degrees - landing zone incline
- wooden cottage - warm up house at top

== Hill records ==
| Date | Metres | Metres | Feet |
|---|---|---|---|
| 8 March 1957 | (East Germany) Helmut Recknagel | 120 | 394 |
| 9 March 1957 | (East Germany) Helmut Recknagel | 124 | 407 |
