= Ski jumping at the 1956 Winter Olympics =

Ski jumping at the VII Olympic Winter Games
- Venue: Trampolino Olimpico
- Dates: 5 February 1956
- Competitors: 51 from 16 nations
- Winning Score: 227.0

Medalists
1st place, gold medalist(s)		Antti Hyvärinen	Finland
2nd place, silver medalist(s)		Aulis Kallakorpi	Finland
3rd place, bronze medalist(s)		Harry Glaß	United Team of Germany

Ski jumping at the 1956 Winter Olympics consisted of one event held on 5 February The competition took place at the Trampolino Olimpico Italia with a K-Point of 72m.

== Medal summary ==
=== Medal table ===
Rank	Nation	Gold	Silver	Bronze	Total
1	Finland	1	1	0	2
2	United Team of Germany	0	0	1	1
Totals (2 entries)		1	1	1	3

Both Finland, which led the medal table, and the unified Germany team won their first Olympic medals in ski jumping.

=== Events ===
Event	Gold		Silver		Bronze	
Individual	Antti Hyvärinen; Finland	227.0	Aulis Kallakorpi; Finland	225.0	Harry Glaß; United Team of Germany	224.5

== Results ==
Rank	Athlete	Country	Jump 1	Jump 2	Total
1st place, gold medalist(s)	Antti Hyvärinen	Finland	111.5	115.5	227.0
2nd place, silver medalist(s)	Aulis Kallakorpi	Finland	114.5	110.5	225.0
3rd place, bronze medalist(s)	Harry Glaß	United Team of Germany	115.0	109.5	224.5
4	Max Bolkart	United Team of Germany	111.5	111.0	222.5
5	Sven Pettersson	Sweden	109.5	110.5	220.0
6	Andreas Däscher	Switzerland	108.0	111.5	219.5
7	Eino Kirjonen	Finland	107.5	111.5	219.0
8	Werner Lesser	United Team of Germany	105.0	105.0	210.0
9	Sverre Stallvik	Norway	104.5	103.5	208.0
10	Hemmo Silvennoinen	Finland	102.5	105.0	207.5
11	Arne Hoel	Norway	104.5	102.0	206.5
12	Sepp Bradl	Austria	104.5	101.0	205.5
13	Hiroshi Yoshizawa	Japan	106.5	98.5	205.0
14	Bror Östman	Sweden	102.5	102.0	204.5
15	Walter Habersatter	Austria	102.0	99.5	201.5
16	Nikolay Shamov	Soviet Union	103.0	98.0	201.0
16	Władysław Tajner	Poland	98.0	103.0	201.0
18	Asbjørn Osnes	Norway	102.0	97.5	199.5
19	Rudolf Schweinberger	Austria	100.0	99.0	199.0
20	Andrzej Gąsienica Daniel	Poland	102.0	96.5	198.5
21	Art Devlin	United States	98.5	96.0	194.5
22	Jože Zidar	Yugoslavia	99.5	94.5	194.0
23	Albin Rogelj	Yugoslavia	94.0	98.5	192.5
24	Janez Polda	Yugoslavia	96.5	95.0	191.5
25	Roman Gąsienica Sieczka	Poland	101.5	88.0	189.5
26	Sepp Kleisl	United Team of Germany	95.0	94.0	189.0
27	Jacques Charland	Canada	94.5	93.5	188.0
28	Mojmír Stuchlík	Czechoslovakia	98.5	89.0	187.5
29	Jáchym Bulín	Czechoslovakia	93.5	92.5	186.0
30	K'oba Ts'akadze	Soviet Union	107.0	78.0	185.0
30	Józef Huczek	Poland	95.5	89.5	185.0
30	Otto Leodolter	Austria	94.0	91.0	185.0
33	Tito Tolin	Italy	91.0	93.5	184.5
34	Yury Moshkin	Soviet Union	91.5	92.5	184.0
35	Sverre Stenersen	Norway	90.5	93.0	183.5
36	Roy Sherwood	United States	94.0	89.0	183.0
37	Luigi Pennacchio	Italy	91.0	89.5	180.5
38	Alfredo Prucker	Italy	88.0	91.5	179.5
39	Koichi Sato	Japan	91.0	87.5	178.5
40	Conrad Rochat	Switzerland	89.5	87.5	177.0
41	Holger Karlsson	Sweden	71.5	104.5	176.0
42	Nicolae Munteanu	Romania	85.0	90.0	175.0
43	Willis Olson	United States	84.5	90.0	174.5
44	Erik Styf	Sweden	102.5	66.5	169.0
45	Francis Perret	Switzerland	86.0	82.5	168.5
46	Richard Rabasa	France	84.5	83.0	167.5
46	André Monnier	France	82.5	85.0	167.5
48	Enzo Perin	Italy	83.5	80.5	164.0
48	Régis Robert Rey	France	82.0	82.0	164.0
50	Janez Gorišek	Yugoslavia	81.5	80.5	162.0
51	Dick Rahoi	United States	86.0	72.0	158.0

== Participating NOCs ==
Sixteen nations participated in ski jumping at the Cortina Games. The Soviet Union made its Olympic ski jumping debut.

- Austria (4)
- Canada (1)
- Czechoslovakia (2)
- Finland (4)
- France (3)
- United Team of Germany (4)
- Italy (4)
- Japan (2)
- Norway (4)
- Poland (4)
- Romania (1)
- Soviet Union (3)
- Sweden (4)
- Switzerland (3)
- United States (4)
- Yugoslavia (4)
