= 1954–55 Four Hills Tournament =

Ski jumping competition

Four Hills Tournament
- Venues: Schattenbergschanze, Große Olympiaschanze, Bergiselschanze, Paul-Ausserleitner-Schanze
- Location: Germany, Austria
- Dates: 30 December 1954 – 8 January 1955
- Nations: 6

Medalists
| gold medal | (Finland) Hemmo Silvennoinen |
| silver medal | (Finland) Eino Kirjonen |
| bronze medal | (Finland) Aulis Kallakorpi |

At the third edition of the annual Four Hills Tournament in Germany and Austria, Hemmo Silvennoinen became the first ski jumper to win the tournament without winning any of the single events. He won ahead of two other Finns.

== Participating nations and athletes ==
Defending champion Olaf Bjørnstad did not compete. The winner of the inaugural tournament, Sepp Bradl did compete and ended up fourth overall, in spite of disappointing results on the German hills (15th and 12th).

The following athletes are on the FIS record, although it is likely incomplete.

| Nation | Athletes |
|---|---|
| Germany | Hermann Anwander, Max Bolkart, Toni Brutscher, Franz Dengg, Franz Eder, Edi Heilingbrunner, Sepp Hohenleitner, Sepp Kleisl, Toni Landenhammer, Ewald Roscher |
| Austria | Sepp Bradl, Franz Gradwohl, Walter Haberstatter, Ernst Hohenegg, Ferdi Kerber, Lois Leodolter, Otto Leodolter, Willi Lichtenegger, Karl Mair, Alwin Plank, Rudi Schweinberger, Erwin Steinegger, Heinz Winkler |
| Finland | Aulis Kallakorpi, Eino Kirjonen, Hemmo Silvennoinen |
| Norway | Gunder Gundersen, Kjell Knarvik, Asbjørn Moland, Torbjørn Ruste, Thorleif Schjelderup |
| Sweden | Lars-Åke Bergseije, Toivo Lauren |
| Switzerland | Gottfried Bühler, Andreas Däscher, Hans Däscher |

== Results ==
=== Oberstdorf ===
(Germany) Schattenbergschanze, Oberstdorf
30 December 1954

| Rank | Name | Points |
|---|---|---|
| 1 | (Finland) Aulis Kallakorpi | 224.0 |
| 2 | (Finland) Eino Kirjonen | 220.0 |
| 2 | (Finland) Hemmo Silvennoinen | 220.0 |
| 4 | (Norway) Kjell Knarvik | 217.0 |
| 4 | (Norway) Torbjørn Ruste | 217.0 |
| 6 | (Germany) Toni Brutscher | 216.5 |
| 7 | (Germany) Sepp Hohenleitner | 216.0 |
| 8 | (Norway) Gunder Gundersen | 215.0 |
| 9 | (Germany) Max Bolkart | 213.5 |
| 10 | (Germany) Sepp Kleisl | 210.0 |

=== Garmisch-Partenkirchen ===
(Germany) Große Olympiaschanze, Garmisch-Partenkirchen
01 January 1955

| Rank | Name | Points |
|---|---|---|
| 1 | (Finland) Aulis Kallakorpi | 228.0 |
| 2 | (Finland) Eino Kirjonen | 220.5 |
| 3 | (Finland) Hemmo Silvennoinen | 218.5 |
| 4 | (Germany) Sepp Hohenleitner | 215.5 |
| 4 | (Norway) Kjell Knarvik | 215.5 |
| 6 | (Norway) Asbjørn Moland | 205.0 |
| 7 | (Germany) Franz Dengg | 203.5 |
| 8 | (Sweden) Lars-Åke Bergseije | 199.0 |
| 9 | (Germany) Sepp Kleisl | 196.0 |
| 9 | (Austria) Alwin Plank | 196.0 |

=== Innsbruck ===
(Austria) Bergiselschanze, Innsbruck
06 January 1954

After two consecutive victories, Aulis Kallakorpi only finished twentieth in Innsbruck, falling back in the overall ranking. Winner Ruste, similarly, was missing a competitive result from Garmisch-Partenkirchen. Thus, Hemmo Silvennoinen took the overall lead, only 1.5 points ahead of Eino Kirjonen.

| Rank | Name | Points |
|---|---|---|
| 1 | (Norway) Torbjørn Ruste | 225.0 |
| 2 | (Finland) Hemmo Silvennoinen | 222.0 |
| 3 | (Germany) Max Bolkart | 221.0 |
| 4 | (Finland) Eino Kirjonen | 218.5 |
| 5 | (Austria) Sepp Bradl | 212.0 |
| 6 | (Germany) Sepp Hohenleitner | 211.5 |
| 7 | (Austria) Alwin Plank | 210.5 |
| 8 | (Norway) Gunder Gundersen | 209.5 |
| 9 | (Germany) Toni Brutscher | 209.0 |
| 10 | (Sweden) Toivo Lauren | 206.0 |

=== Bischofshofen ===
(Austria) Paul-Ausserleitner-Schanze, Bischofshofen
08 January 1954

| Rank | Name | Points |
|---|---|---|
| 1 | (Norway) Torbjørn Ruste | 224.5 |
| 2 | (Finland) Hemmo Silvennoinen | 217.5 |
| 3 | (Finland) Eino Kirjonen | 216.2 |
| 4 | (Austria) Sepp Bradl | 215.1 |
| 5 | (Germany) Franz Eder | 205.8 |
| 6 | (Finland) Aulis Kallakorpi | 205.1 |
| 7 | (Sweden) Toivo Lauren | 204.2 |
| 8 | (Austria) Alwin Plank | 201.9 |
| 9 | (Norway) Kjell Knarvik | 200.8 |
| 10 | (Austria) Otto Leodolter | 199.0 |

== Final ranking ==
| Rank | Name | Garmisch-Partenkirchen | Oberstorf | Innsbruck | Bischofshofen | Points |
|---|---|---|---|---|---|---|
| 1 | (Finland) Hemmo Silvennoinen | 2nd | 3rd | 2nd | 2nd | 878.0 |
| 2 | (Finland) Eino Kirjonen | 2nd | 2nd | 4th | 3rd | 875.2 |
| 3 | (Finland) Aulis Kallakorpi | 1st | 1st | 20th | 6th | 851.1 |
| 4 | (Austria) Sepp Bradl | 15th | 12th | 5th | 4th | 830.1 |
| 5 | (Norway) Kjell Knarvik | 4th | 4th | 24th | 9th | 824.3 |
