= List of Olympic medalists in ski jumping =

This is the complete list of Olympic medalists in ski jumping.

It is controversial whether the Olympic Games from 1924 to 1960 were normal hill or large hill competitions. Even the International Olympic Committee (IOC) has no clear consensus on this.

== Men ==
=== Normal hill individual ===
Games	Gold	Silver	Bronze
1964 Innsbruck	Veikko Kankkonen; Finland	Toralf Engan; Norway	Torgeir Brandtzæg; Norway
1968 Grenoble	Jiří Raška; Czechoslovakia	Reinhold Bachler; Austria	Baldur Preiml; Austria
1972 Sapporo	Yukio Kasaya; Japan	Akitsugu Konno; Japan	Seiji Aochi; Japan
1976 Innsbruck	Hans-Georg Aschenbach; East Germany	Jochen Danneberg; East Germany	Karl Schnabl; Austria
1980 Lake Placid	Toni Innauer; Austria	Manfred Deckert; East Germany; Hirokazu Yagi; Japan	not awarded
1984 Sarajevo	Jens Weißflog; East Germany	Matti Nykänen; Finland	Jari Puikkonen; Finland
1988 Calgary	Matti Nykänen; Finland	Pavel Ploc; Czechoslovakia	Jiří Malec; Czechoslovakia
1992 Albertville	Ernst Vettori; Austria	Martin Höllwarth; Austria	Toni Nieminen; Finland
1994 Lillehammer	Espen Bredesen; Norway	Lasse Ottesen; Norway	Dieter Thoma; Germany
1998 Nagano	Jani Soininen; Finland	Kazuyoshi Funaki; Japan	Andreas Widhölzl; Austria
2002 Salt Lake City	Simon Ammann; Switzerland	Sven Hannawald; Germany	Adam Małysz; Poland
2006 Turin	Lars Bystøl; Norway	Matti Hautamäki; Finland	Roar Ljøkelsøy; Norway
2010 Vancouver	Simon Ammann; Switzerland	Adam Małysz; Poland	Gregor Schlierenzauer; Austria
2014 Sochi	Kamil Stoch; Poland	Peter Prevc; Slovenia	Anders Bardal; Norway
2018 Pyeongchang	Andreas Wellinger; Germany	Johann André Forfang; Norway	Robert Johansson; Norway
2022 Beijing	Ryōyū Kobayashi; Japan	Manuel Fettner; Austria	Dawid Kubacki; Poland
2026 Milano Cortina	Philipp Raimund; Germany	Kacper Tomasiak; Poland	Ren Nikaidō; Japan; Gregor Deschwanden; Switzerland

Medals
Rank	Nation	Gold	Silver	Bronze	Total
1	Finland	3	2	2	7
2	Austria	2	3	4	9
3	Norway	2	3	4	9
4	Japan	2	3	2	7
5	East Germany	2	2	0	4
6	Germany	2	1	1	4
7	Switzerland	2	0	1	3
8	Poland	1	2	2	5
9	Czechoslovakia	1	1	1	3
10	Slovenia	0	1	0	1
Total	10 nations	17	18	17	52

=== Large hill individual ===
The individual large hill event is one of only ten events which have featured in every Winter Olympic Games.

Games	Gold	Silver	Bronze
1924 Chamonix	Jacob Tullin Thams; Norway	Narve Bonna; Norway	Anders Haugen; United States
1928 St. Moritz	Alf Andersen; Norway	Sigmund Ruud; Norway	Rudolf Burkert; Czechoslovakia
1932 Lake Placid	Birger Ruud; Norway	Hans Beck; Norway	Kaare Wahlberg; Norway
1936 Garmisch-Partenkirchen	Birger Ruud; Norway	Sven Eriksson; Sweden	Reidar Andersen; Norway
1948 St. Moritz	Petter Hugsted; Norway	Birger Ruud; Norway	Thorleif Schjelderup; Norway
1952 Oslo	Arnfinn Bergmann; Norway	Torbjørn Falkanger; Norway	Karl Holmström; Sweden
1956 Cortina d'Ampezzo	Antti Hyvärinen; Finland	Aulis Kallakorpi; Finland	Harry Glaß; United Team of Germany
1960 Squaw Valley	Helmut Recknagel; United Team of Germany	Niilo Halonen; Finland	Otto Leodolter; Austria
1964 Innsbruck	Toralf Engan; Norway	Veikko Kankkonen; Finland	Torgeir Brandtzæg; Norway
1968 Grenoble	Vladimir Belousov; Soviet Union	Jiří Raška; Czechoslovakia	Lars Grini; Norway
1972 Sapporo	Wojciech Fortuna; Poland	Walter Steiner; Switzerland	Rainer Schmidt; East Germany
1976 Innsbruck	Karl Schnabl; Austria	Toni Innauer; Austria	Henry Glaß; East Germany
1980 Lake Placid	Jouko Törmänen; Finland	Hubert Neuper; Austria	Jari Puikkonen; Finland
1984 Sarajevo	Matti Nykänen; Finland	Jens Weißflog; East Germany	Pavel Ploc; Czechoslovakia
1988 Calgary	Matti Nykänen; Finland	Erik Johnsen; Norway	Matjaž Debelak; Yugoslavia
1992 Albertville	Toni Nieminen; Finland	Martin Höllwarth; Austria	Heinz Kuttin; Austria
1994 Lillehammer	Jens Weißflog; Germany	Espen Bredesen; Norway	Andreas Goldberger; Austria
1998 Nagano	Kazuyoshi Funaki; Japan	Jani Soininen; Finland	Masahiko Harada; Japan
2002 Salt Lake City	Simon Ammann; Switzerland	Adam Małysz; Poland	Matti Hautamäki; Finland
2006 Turin	Thomas Morgenstern; Austria	Andreas Kofler; Austria	Lars Bystøl; Norway
2010 Vancouver	Simon Ammann; Switzerland	Adam Małysz; Poland	Gregor Schlierenzauer; Austria
2014 Sochi	Kamil Stoch; Poland	Noriaki Kasai; Japan	Peter Prevc; Slovenia
2018 Pyeongchang	Kamil Stoch; Poland	Andreas Wellinger; Germany	Robert Johansson; Norway
2022 Beijing	Marius Lindvik; Norway	Ryōyū Kobayashi; Japan	Karl Geiger; Germany
2026 Milan Cortina	Domen Prevc; Slovenia	Ren Nikaidō; Japan	Kacper Tomasiak; Poland

Medals
Rank	Nation	Gold	Silver	Bronze	Total
1	Norway	8	7	7	22
2	Finland	5	4	2	11
3	Poland	3	2	1	6
4	Austria	2	4	4	10
5	Switzerland	2	1	0	3
6	Japan	1	3	1	5
7	Germany	1	1	1	3
8	Slovenia	1	0	1	2
8	United Team of Germany	1	0	1	2
10	Soviet Union	1	0	0	1
11	Czechoslovakia	0	1	2	3
11	East Germany	0	1	2	3
13	Sweden	0	1	1	2
14	United States	0	0	1	1
14	Yugoslavia	0	0	1	1
Total	15 nations	24	24	24	72

=== Large hill team ===
Games	Gold	Silver	Bronze
1988 Calgary	Finland; Ari-Pekka Nikkola; Matti Nykänen; Tuomo Ylipulli; Jari Puikkonen	Yugoslavia; Primož Ulaga; Matjaž Zupan; Matjaž Debelak; Miran Tepeš	Norway; Ole Christian Eidhammer; Jon Inge Kjørum; Ole Gunnar Fidjestøl; Erik Johnsen
1992 Albertville	Finland; Ari-Pekka Nikkola; Mika Laitinen; Risto Laakkonen; Toni Nieminen	Austria; Heinz Kuttin; Ernst Vettori; Martin Höllwarth; Andreas Felder	Czechoslovakia; František Jež; Tomáš Goder; Jaroslav Sakala; Jiří Parma
1994 Lillehammer	Germany; Hansjörg Jäkle; Christof Duffner; Dieter Thoma; Jens Weißflog	Japan; Jin'ya Nishikata; Takanobu Okabe; Noriaki Kasai; Masahiko Harada	Austria; Heinz Kuttin; Christian Moser; Stefan Horngacher; Andreas Goldberger
1998 Nagano	Japan; Takanobu Okabe; Hiroya Saitō; Masahiko Harada; Kazuyoshi Funaki	Germany; Sven Hannawald; Martin Schmitt; Hansjörg Jäkle; Dieter Thoma	Austria; Reinhard Schwarzenberger; Martin Höllwarth; Stefan Horngacher; Andreas Widhölzl
2002 Salt Lake City	Germany; Michael Uhrmann; Stephan Hocke; Sven Hannawald; Martin Schmitt	Finland; Matti Hautamäki; Veli-Matti Lindström; Risto Jussilainen; Janne Ahonen	Slovenia; Damjan Fras; Primož Peterka; Robert Kranjec; Peter Žonta
2006 Turin	Austria; Andreas Widhölzl; Andreas Kofler; Martin Koch; Thomas Morgenstern	Finland; Tami Kiuru; Janne Happonen; Janne Ahonen; Matti Hautamäki	Norway; Lars Bystøl; Bjørn Einar Romøren; Tommy Ingebrigtsen; Roar Ljøkelsøy
2010 Vancouver	Austria; Wolfgang Loitzl; Andreas Kofler; Thomas Morgenstern; Gregor Schlierenzauer	Germany; Michael Neumayer; Andreas Wank; Martin Schmitt; Michael Uhrmann	Norway; Anders Bardal; Tom Hilde; Johan Remen Evensen; Anders Jacobsen
2014 Sochi	Germany; Andreas Wank; Marinus Kraus; Andreas Wellinger; Severin Freund	Austria; Michael Hayböck; Thomas Morgenstern; Thomas Diethart; Gregor Schlierenzauer	Japan; Reruhi Shimizu; Taku Takeuchi; Daiki Ito; Noriaki Kasai
2018 Pyeongchang	Norway; Daniel-André Tande; Andreas Stjernen; Johann André Forfang; Robert Johansson	Germany; Karl Geiger; Stephan Leyhe; Richard Freitag; Andreas Wellinger	Poland; Maciej Kot; Stefan Hula; Dawid Kubacki; Kamil Stoch
2022 Beijing	Austria; Stefan Kraft; Daniel Huber; Jan Hörl; Manuel Fettner	Slovenia; Lovro Kos; Cene Prevc; Timi Zajc; Peter Prevc	Germany; Constantin Schmid; Stephan Leyhe; Markus Eisenbichler; Karl Geiger
2026 Milan Cortina	Austria; Jan Hörl; Stephan Embacher	Poland; Paweł Wąsek; Kacper Tomasiak	Norway; Johann André Forfang; Kristoffer Eriksen Sundal

Medals
Rank	Nation	Gold	Silver	Bronze	Total
1	Germany	3	3	1	7
2	Austria	4	2	2	8
3	Finland	2	2	0	4
4	Japan	1	1	1	3
5	Norway	1	0	4	5
6	Slovenia	0	1	1	2
6	Poland	0	1	1	2
8	Yugoslavia	0	1	0	1
9	Czechoslovakia	0	0	1	1
Total	9 nations	11	11	11	33

== Women ==
=== Normal hill individual ===
Games	Gold	Silver	Bronze
2014 Sochi	Carina Vogt; Germany	Daniela Iraschko-Stolz; Austria	Coline Mattel; France
2018 Pyeongchang	Maren Lundby; Norway	Katharina Althaus; Germany	Sara Takanashi; Japan
2022 Beijing	Urša Bogataj; Slovenia	Katharina Althaus; Germany	Nika Križnar; Slovenia
2026 Milano Cortina	Anna Odine Strøm; Norway	Nika Prevc; Slovenia	Nozomi Maruyama; Japan

Medals
Rank	Nation	Gold	Silver	Bronze	Total
1	Norway	2	0	0	2
2	Germany	1	2	0	3
3	Slovenia	1	1	1	3
4	Austria	0	1	0	1
5	Japan	0	0	2	2
6	France	0	0	1	1
Total	6 nations	4	4	4	12

=== Large hill individual ===
Games	Gold	Silver	Bronze
2026 Milano Cortina	Anna Odine Strøm; Norway	Eirin Maria Kvandal; Norway	Nika Prevc; Slovenia

Medals
Rank	Nation	Gold	Silver	Bronze	Total
1	Norway	1	1	1	3
Total	1 nation	1	1	1	3

== Mixed ==
=== Normal hill team ===
Games	Gold	Silver	Bronze
2022 Beijing	Slovenia; Nika Križnar; Timi Zajc; Urša Bogataj; Peter Prevc	ROC; Irma Makhinia; Danil Sadreev; Irina Avvakumova; Evgenii Klimov	Canada; Alexandria Loutitt; Matthew Soukup; Abigail Strate; Mackenzie Boyd-Clowes
2026 Milan Cortina	Slovenia; Nika Vodan; Anže Lanišek; Nika Prevc; Domen Prevc	Norway; Anna Odine Strøm; Kristoffer Eriksen Sundal; Eirin Maria Kvandal; Marius Lindvik	Japan; Nozomi Maruyama; Ryōyū Kobayashi; Sara Takanashi; Ren Nikaidō

Medals
Rank	Nation	Gold	Silver	Bronze	Total
1	Slovenia	2	0	0	2
2	Norway	0	1	0	1
2	ROC (ROC)	0	1	0	1
4	Canada	0	0	1	1
4	Japan	0	0	1	1
Total	5 nations	2	2	2	6

== Statistics ==
=== Athlete medal leaders (men) ===
Three or more Olympic medals in ski jumping:

Athlete	Nation	Medal Winning Span	Gold	Silver	Bronze	Total
Matti Nykänen	Finland	1984–1988	4	1	0	5
Simon Ammann	Switzerland	2002–2010	4	0	0	4
Jens Weißflog	East Germany; Germany	1984–1994	3	1	0	4
Thomas Morgenstern	Austria	2006–2014	3	1	0	4
Kamil Stoch	Poland	2014–2018	3	0	1	4
Andreas Wellinger	Germany	2014–2018	2	2	0	4
Peter Prevc	Slovenia	2014–2022	1	2	1	4
Gregor Schlierenzauer	Austria	2010–2014	1	1	2	4
Martin Höllwarth	Austria	1992–1998	0	3	1	4
Adam Małysz	Poland	2002–2010	0	3	1	4
Matti Hautamäki	Finland	2002–2006	0	3	1	4
Kazuyoshi Funaki	Japan	1998	2	1	0	3
Birger Ruud	Norway	1932–1948	2	1	0	3
Andreas Kofler	Austria	2006–2010	2	1	0	3
Toni Nieminen	Finland	1992	2	0	1	3
Sven Hannawald	Germany	1998–2002	1	2	0	3
Martin Schmitt	Germany	1998–2010	1	2	0	3
Dieter Thoma	Germany	1994–1998	1	1	1	3
Masahiko Harada	Japan	1994–1998	1	1	1	3
Ryoyu Kobayashi	Japan	2022–2026	1	1	1	3
Johann André Forfang	Norway	2018–2026	1	1	1	3
Lars Bystøl	Norway	2006	1	0	2	3
Robert Johansson	Norway	2018	1	0	2	3
Jari Puikkonen	Finland	1980–1988	1	0	2	3
Andreas Widhölzl	Austria	1998–2006	1	0	2	3
Noriaki Kasai	Japan	1994–2014	0	2	1	3
Kacper Tomasiak	Poland	2026	0	2	1	3
Heinz Kuttin	Austria	1992–1994	0	1	2	3
Karl Geiger	Germany	2018–2022	0	1	2	3
Ren Nikaido	Japan	2026	0	1	2	3

Most individual medals (athletes with at least one gold medal or at least two medals including at least one silver medal):

Athlete	Nation	Medal Winning Span	Gold	Silver	Bronze	Total
Simon Ammann	Switzerland	2002–2010	4	0	0	4
Matti Nykänen	Finland	1984–1988	3	1	0	4
Kamil Stoch	Poland	2014–2018	3	0	0	3
Birger Ruud	Norway	1932–1948	2	1	0	3
Jens Weißflog	East Germany; Germany	1984–1994	2	1	0	3
Andreas Wellinger	Germany	2014–2018	1	1	0	2
Toralf Engan	Norway	1964	1	1	0	2
Jiří Raška	Czech Republic	1968	1	1	0	2
Toni Innauer	Austria	1976–1980	1	1	0	2
Espen Bredesen	Norway	1994	1	1	0	2
Jani Soininen	Finland	1998	1	1	0	2
Kazuyoshi Funaki	Japan	1998	1	1	0	2
Veikko Kankkonen	Finland	1964	1	1	0	2
Ryōyū Kobayashi	Japan	2022	1	1	0	2
Karl Schnabl	Austria	1976	1	0	1	2
Toni Nieminen	Finland	1992	1	0	1	2
Lars Bystøl	Norway	2006	1	0	1	2
Thomas Morgenstern	Austria	2006–2014	1	0	0	1
Jacob Tullin Thams	Norway	1924	1	0	0	1
Alf Andersen	Norway	1928	1	0	0	1
Petter Hugsted	Norway	1948	1	0	0	1
Arnfinn Bergmann	Norway	1952	1	0	0	1
Antti Hyvärinen	Finland	1956	1	0	0	1
Helmut Recknagel	United Team of Germany	1960	1	0	0	1
Vladimir Belousov	Soviet Union	1968	1	0	0	1
Wojciech Fortuna	Poland	1972	1	0	0	1
Jouko Törmänen	Finland	1980	1	0	0	1
Hans-Georg Aschenbach	East Germany	1976	1	0	0	1
Yukio Kasaya	Japan	1972	1	0	0	1
Ernst Vettori	Austria	1992	1	0	0	1
Marius Lindvik	Norway	2022	1	0	0	1
Domen Prevc	Slovenia	2026	1	0	0	1
Philipp Raimund	Germany	2026	1	0	0	1
Adam Małysz	Poland	2002–2010	0	3	1	4
Martin Höllwarth	Austria	1992–1998	0	2	0	2
Matti Hautamäki	Finland	2002–2006	0	1	1	2
Pavel Ploc	Czech Republic	1984–1988	0	1	1	2
Peter Prevc	Slovenia	2014	0	1	1	2
Ren Nikaido	Japan	2026	0	1	1	2
Kacper Tomasiak	Poland	2026	0	1	1	2

=== Athlete medal leaders (women) ===
Athletes with at least two medals.

Athlete	Nation	Medal Winning Span	Gold	Silver	Bronze	Total
Anna Odine Strøm	Norway	2026	2	1	0	3
Nika Vodan	Slovenia	2022–2026	2	0	1	3
Urša Bogataj	Slovenia	2022	2	0	0	2
Nika Prevc	Slovenia	2026	1	1	1	3
Eirin Maria Kvandal	Norway	2026	0	2	0	2
Katharina Althaus	Germany	2018–2022	0	2	0	2
Sara Takanashi	Japan	2018–2026	0	0	2	2
Nozomi Maruyama	Japan	2026	0	0	2	2

Most individual medals (athletes with at least one gold medal or at least two medals including at least one silver medal).

Athlete	Nation	Medal Winning Span	Gold	Silver	Bronze	Total
Anna Odine Strøm	Norway	2026	2	0	0	2
Carina Vogt	Germany	2014	1	0	0	1
Maren Lundby	Norway	2018	1	0	0	1
Ursa Bogataj	Slovenia	2022	1	0	0	1
Katharina Althaus	Germany	2018–2022	0	2	0	2
Nika Prevc	Slovenia	2026	0	1	1	2

=== Medals per year ===
×	NOC did not exist or did not participate	#	Number of medals won by the NOC	–	NOC did not win any medals

Nation	24	28	32	36	48	52	56	60	64	68	72	76	80	84	88	92	94	98	02	06	10	14	18	22	Total
Austria	–	–	–	–	–	–	–	1	–	2	–	3	2	–	–	5	2	2	–	3	3	2	–	2	27
Canada	–	–	–	–	–	–	–	–	–	–	–	–	–	–	–	–	–	–	–	–	–	–	–	1	1
Czechoslovakia	–	1	–	–	–	–	–	–	–	2	–	–	–	1	2	1	×	×	×	×	×	×	×	×	7
Finland	–	–	–	–	–	–	2	1	2	–	–	–	2	3	3	3	–	2	2	2	–	–	–	–	22
France	–	–	–	–	–	–	–	–	–	–	–	–	–	–	–	–	–	–	–	–	–	1	–	–	1
Germany	×	–	–	–	×	–	×	×	×	×	×	×	×	×	×	–	3	1	2	–	1	2	4	3	16
United Team of Germany	×	×	×	×	×	×	1	1	–	×	×	×	×	×	×	×	×	×	×	×	×	×	×	×	2
East Germany	×	×	×	×	×	×	×	×	×	×	1	3	1	2	–	×	×	×	×	×	×	×	×	×	7
Japan	×	–	–	–	×	–	–	–	–	–	3	–	1	–	–	–	1	4	–	–	–	2	1	2	14
Norway	2	2	3	2	3	2	–	–	4	1	–	–	–	–	2	–	3	–	–	4	1	1	5	1	36
Poland	–	–	–	–	–	–	–	–	–	–	1	–	–	–	–	–	–	–	2	–	2	2	2	1	10
ROC (ROC)	×	×	×	×	×	×	×	×	×	×	×	×	×	×	×	×	×	×	×	×	×	×	×	1	1
Slovenia	×	×	×	×	×	×	×	×	×	×	×	×	×	×	×	–	–	–	1	–	–	2	–	4	7
Soviet Union	×	×	×	×	×	×	–	–	–	1	–	–	–	–	–	×	×	×	×	×	×	×	×	×	1
Sweden	–	–	–	1	–	1	–	–	–	–	–	–	–	–	–	–	–	–	–	–	–	–	–	–	2
Switzerland	–	–	–	–	–	–	–	–	–	–	1	–	–	–	–	–	–	–	2	–	2	–	–	–	5
United States	1	–	–	–	–	–	–	–	–	–	–	–	–	–	–	–	–	–	–	–	–	–	–	–	1
Yugoslavia	–	–	×	–	–	–	–	×	–	–	–	–	–	–	2	–	×	×	×	×	×	×	×	×	2
Total	3	3	3	3	3	3	3	3	6	6	6	6	6	6	9	9	9	9	9	9	9	12	12	15	162

=== Medal sweep events ===
These are events in which athletes from one NOC won all three medals.

Games	Event	Nation	Gold	Silver	Bronze
1932 Lake Placid	Large Hill	Norway	Birger Ruud	Hans Beck	Kaare Wahlberg
1948 St. Moritz	Large Hill	Norway	Petter Hugsted	Birger Ruud	Thorleif Schjelderup
1972 Sapporo	Normal Hill	Japan	Yukio Kasaya	Akitsugu Konno	Seiji Aochi

== See also ==
- List of FIS Nordic World Ski Championships medalists in ski jumping
