= Uotinen =

Uotinen is a Finnish surname. Notable people with the surname include:

- Pentti Uotinen (1931–2010), Finnish ski jumper
- Jorma Uotinen (born 1950), Finnish dancer, singer and choreographer
- Jani Uotinen (born 1978), Finnish footballer
