= Ruste =

Ruste is a surname. Notable people with the surname include:

- Arne Ruste (born 1942), Norwegian poet, essayist, novelist, and magazine editor
- Henry Ruste (1917–1993), Canadian politician
- Ivar Ruste (1916–1985), Norwegian singer
- Torbjørn Ruste (1929–2003), Norwegian ski jumper
