= Nicolae Munteanu (ski jumper) =

Romanian ski jumper

Personal information
- Nationality: Romanian
- Born: 6 December 1931

Sport
- Sport: Ski jumping

Nicolae Munteanu (born 6 December 1931) is a Romanian ski jumper. He competed in the individual event at the 1956 Winter Olympics.
