= Erik Styf =

Swedish ski jumper

Personal information
- Nationality: Swedish
- Born: 4 December 1932; Sundsvall, Sweden
- Died: 1 April 2001 (aged 68); Katrineholm, Sweden

Sport
- Sport: Ski jumping

Erik Styf (4 December 1932 – 1 April 2001) was a Swedish ski jumper. He competed in the individual event at the 1956 Winter Olympics.

In 1954, Styf finished fifth in the ski jump competition at the World Ski Championships in Falun, two places behind his fellow Swede Bror Östman. At the Olympics, his first jump was equal to Östman's, but his second fell far short and resulted in him dropping to 44th place overall.

In the second heat of Swiss international ski week in January 1957, Styf jumped 71.0 metres, the longest of the day's competition and not far short of the course record. He last competed at the Four Hills Tournament in 1958, finishing in 10th place.
