= Conrad Rochat =

Swiss ski jumper

Personal information
- Nationality: Swiss
- Born: 10 July 1927
- Died: 24 May 2014 (aged 86); La Sarraz, Switzerland

Sport
- Sport: Ski jumping

Conrad Rochat (10 July 1927 – 24 May 2014) was a Swiss ski jumper. He competed in the individual event at the 1956 Winter Olympics.
