= Rudolf Schweinberger =

Austrian ski jumper

Personal information
- Nationality: Austrian
- Born: 10 April 1935 (age 89)

Sport
- Sport: Ski jumping

Rudolf Schweinberger (born 10 April 1935) is an Austrian ski jumper. He competed in the individual event at the 1956 Winter Olympics.
