= Roman Gąsienica Sieczka =

Polish ski jumper

Personal information
- Nationality: Polish
- Born: 30 April 1934; Zakopane, Poland
- Died: 26 August 2006 (aged 72); Zakopane, Poland

Sport
- Sport: Ski jumping

Roman Gąsienica Sieczka (30 April 1934 – 26 August 2006) was a Polish ski jumper. He competed in the individual event at the 1956 Winter Olympics.
