= Bror Östman =

Swedish ski jumper

Medal record

Men's ski jumping

Representing Sweden

World Championships
Bronze medal – third place	1954 Falun	Individual large hill

Bror Gunnar Östman (10 October 1928 – 23 April 1992) was a Swedish ski jumper who competed in the 1950s. Born in Själevad, he won the ski jumping bronze medal at the 1954 FIS Nordic World Ski Championships in Falun.

At the 1952 Winter Olympics he finished 32nd in the only ski jumping event.

Four years later he finished 14th in the ski jumping event at the 1956 Winter Olympics.
