= Oddvar Saga =

Norwegian ski jumper

Oddvar Saga (2 January 1934 – 8 January 2000) was a Norwegian ski jumper, who had his prime between 1960 and 1964.

He hailed from Vegårshei Municipality. In 1993 the newspaper Aftenposten called him one of the three "national greats" to come from this place, together with Ole Colbjørnsen and a wolf. Saga represented the club Horten SK.

He is best known for participating in the 1961–1962 Four Hills Tournament. He finished 3rd in the Schattenbergschanze, 27th in the Bergiselschanze, 29th in the Große Olympiaschanze and 8th in the Paul-Ausserleitner-Schanze, giving him a 9th place overall as the best Norwegian. Saga was later a candidate for Norway at the 1964 Winter Olympics. Already in 1963 the ski jumpers Torgeir Brandtzæg, Toralf Engan, Bjørn Wirkola, Hans Olav Sørensen and Torbjørn Yggeseth were as good as ready, and one was looking for a sixth man on the team. However, only those five competed at the Olympics.
