= Jakub Węgrzynkiewicz =

Polish ski jumper

Personal information
- Born: 21 July 1928 Szczyrk, Poland
- Died: 20 June 2006 (aged 77) Szczyrk, Poland

Sport
- Sport: Skiing
- Club: WKS Zakopane
- Updated on 22 February 2014

Jakub Węgrzynkiewicz (21 July 1928 in Szczyrk – 20 June 2006 in Szczyrk) was a Polish ski jumper who competed from 1952 to 1957. He finished 33rd in the individual large hill event at the 1952 Winter Olympics in Oslo, which was his best career finish.
