= Bruno De Zordo =

Italian ski jumper

Personal information
- Nationality: Italian
- Born: 18 November 1941; Cibiana di Cadore, Italy
- Died: 25 June 2004 (aged 62)

Sport
- Sport: Ski jumping

Bruno De Zordo (18 November 1941 – 25 June 2004) was an Italian ski jumper. He competed in the normal hill event at the 1964 Winter Olympics.
