= Andreas Däscher =

Swiss ski jumper (1927–2023)

Personal information
- Nationality: Switzerland
- Born: 9 June 1927 Davos, Switzerland
- Died: 4 August 2023 (aged 96) Meilen, Switzerland

Sport
- Sport: Skiing
- Club: SC Meilen

Andreas Däscher (9 June 1927 – 4 August 2023) was a Swiss ski jumper who is best known for developing the parallel style, or Däscher technique, in the 1950s. This technique became widely used throughout ski jumping until the early 1990s.

This technique was the standard technique until the V-style was developed by Jan Boklöv in 1985. The Daescher technique superseded the Kongsberger technique developed by Jacob Tullin Thams and Sigmund Ruud (both from Norway) after World War I in Kongsberg. Erich Windisch, a German Olympic ski jumper, who developed in 1949 a jumping technique in which the jumper's arms are slightly arched and pointing downward, is also credited along with Däscher of developing the revamped aerodynamic jumping style that was used in elite competition for over 30 years.

== Career ==
On 3 March 1950, he set the ski jumping world record distance for a very short period of time at 130 metres (426.5 ft) on Heini-Klopfer-Skiflugschanze in Oberstdorf, West Germany. (Note: According to official German radio report, which was cited and published in Ljudska pravica (4/3/1950), jumps were following in the next order: Andreas Däscher (130 m), then Dan Netzell (135 m) and the last Sepp Weiler (133 m).) Däscher's best Olympic finish was 6th in the large Hill at the 1956 Winter Olympics in Cortina d'Ampezzo. He was born in Davos.

== Personal life and death ==
His brother, Hans Däscher, was also a ski jumper. Andreas Däscher died in Meilen on 4 August 2023, at the age of 96.

== Four Hills Tournament ==
=== Overall standings ===
Season	Rank	Points
1954/55	28	194.7
1956/57	52	218.5
1959/60	37	414.5

== Ski jumping world record ==
Date	Hill	Location	Metres	Feet
3 March 1950	Heini-Klopfer-Skiflugschanze	Oberstdorf, West Germany	130	426.5
