= Józef Huczek =

Polish ski jumper

Personal information
- Nationality: Polish
- Born: 16 March 1935; Bielsko-Biała, Poland
- Died: 3 January 1972 (aged 36); Szczyrk, Poland

Sport
- Sport: Ski jumping

Józef Huczek (16 March 1935 – 3 January 1972) was a Polish ski jumper. He competed in the individual event at the 1956 Winter Olympics.
