= Torbjørn Ruste =

Norwegian ski jumper

Torbjørn Ruste (December 9, 1929 – July 31, 2003) was a Norwegian ski jumper who competed in the mid-1950s. He won two events at the 1954-55 Four Hills Tournament, earning them at Innsbruck and Bischofshofen.
