= Sverre Stallvik =

Norwegian ski jumper

Sverre Stallvik (11 October 1927 – 7 March 2015) was a Norwegian ski jumper who competed in the 1950s.

He was born in Trondheim and represented the club Byåsen IL. He placed ninth in the individual ski jump event at the 1956 Winter Olympics in Cortina d'Ampezzo. He became Norwegian Champion in 1955.
