= Yury Moshkin =

Soviet ski jumper (born 1931)

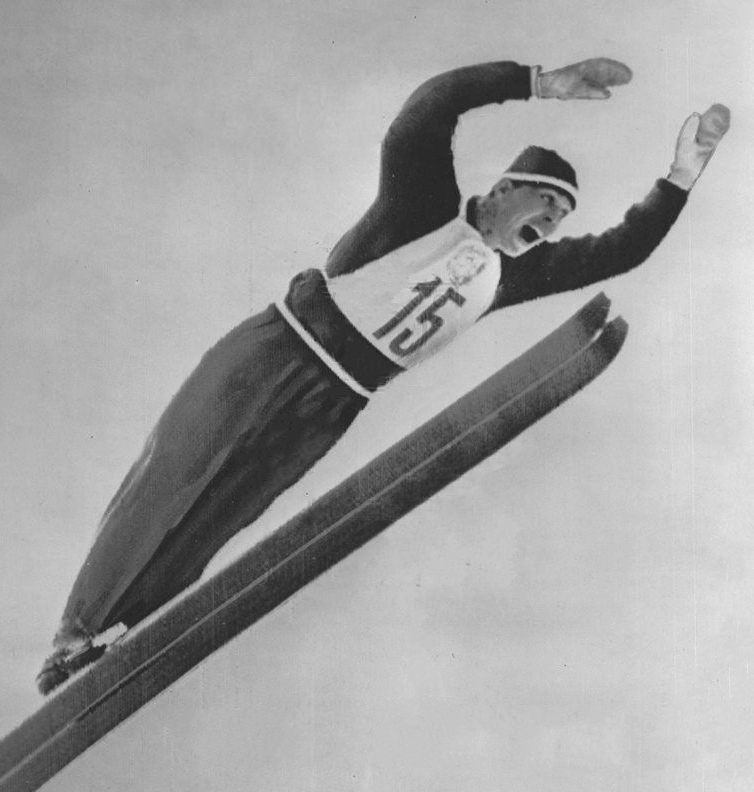
- Moshkin at the 1956 Olympics

Personal information
- Born: 1931 Nizhny Novgorod Oblast, Russian SFSR, Soviet Union

Sport
- Sport: Nordic combined, ski jumping

Yury Moshkin (Russian: Юрий Мошкин, born 1931) is a retired Soviet skier. He placed 13th in the Nordic combined and 34th in ski jumping at the 1956 Winter Olympics. In the Nordic combined competition he won the ski jumping event, but finished only 31st in the cross-country race.
