= Yuri Skvortsov =

Soviet ski jumper (1929–1998)

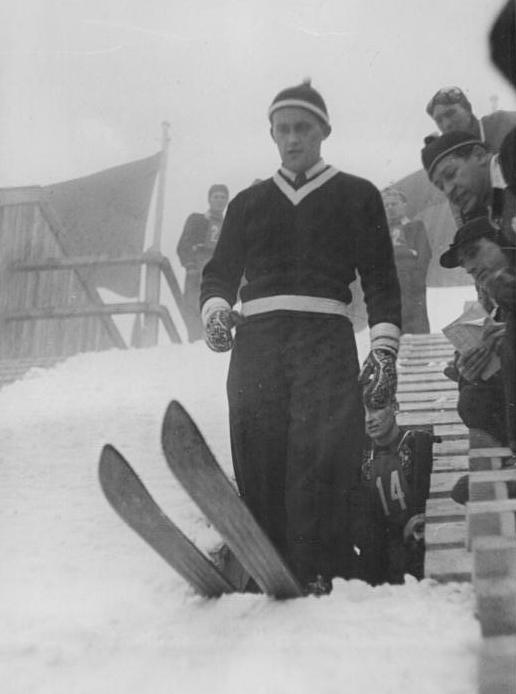
Skvortsov in 1950

Yuri Alexandrovich Skvortsov (Russian: Юрий Александрович Скворцов) (20 February 1929 in Moscow – 1998) was a Soviet ski jumper who competed in the late 1950s. He won the 1955-6 Four Hills Tournament event at Bischofshofen.

He is buried at Kuntsevo Cemetery in Moscow.
