= Pentti Uotinen =

Finnish ski jumper

Pentti Armas Uotinen (27 September 1931 – 3 November 2010) was a Finnish ski jumper who competed from 1951 to 1957. He was born in Orimattila.

Uotinen finished tied for eighth in the individual normal hill event at the 1952 Winter Olympics in Oslo. Uotinen's only career victory occurred in West Germany in 1956.
