= Mojmír Stuchlík =

Czech ski jumper

Personal information
- Nationality: Czech
- Born: 30 June 1930; Bítouchov (part of Semily), Czechoslovakia
- Died: 10 September 2016 (aged 86); Semily, Czech Republic

Sport
- Sport: Ski jumping

Mojmír Stuchlík (30 June 1930 - 10 September 2016) was a Czech ski jumper. He competed in the individual event at the 1956 Winter Olympics.
