= Hemmo Silvennoinen =

Finnish ski jumper

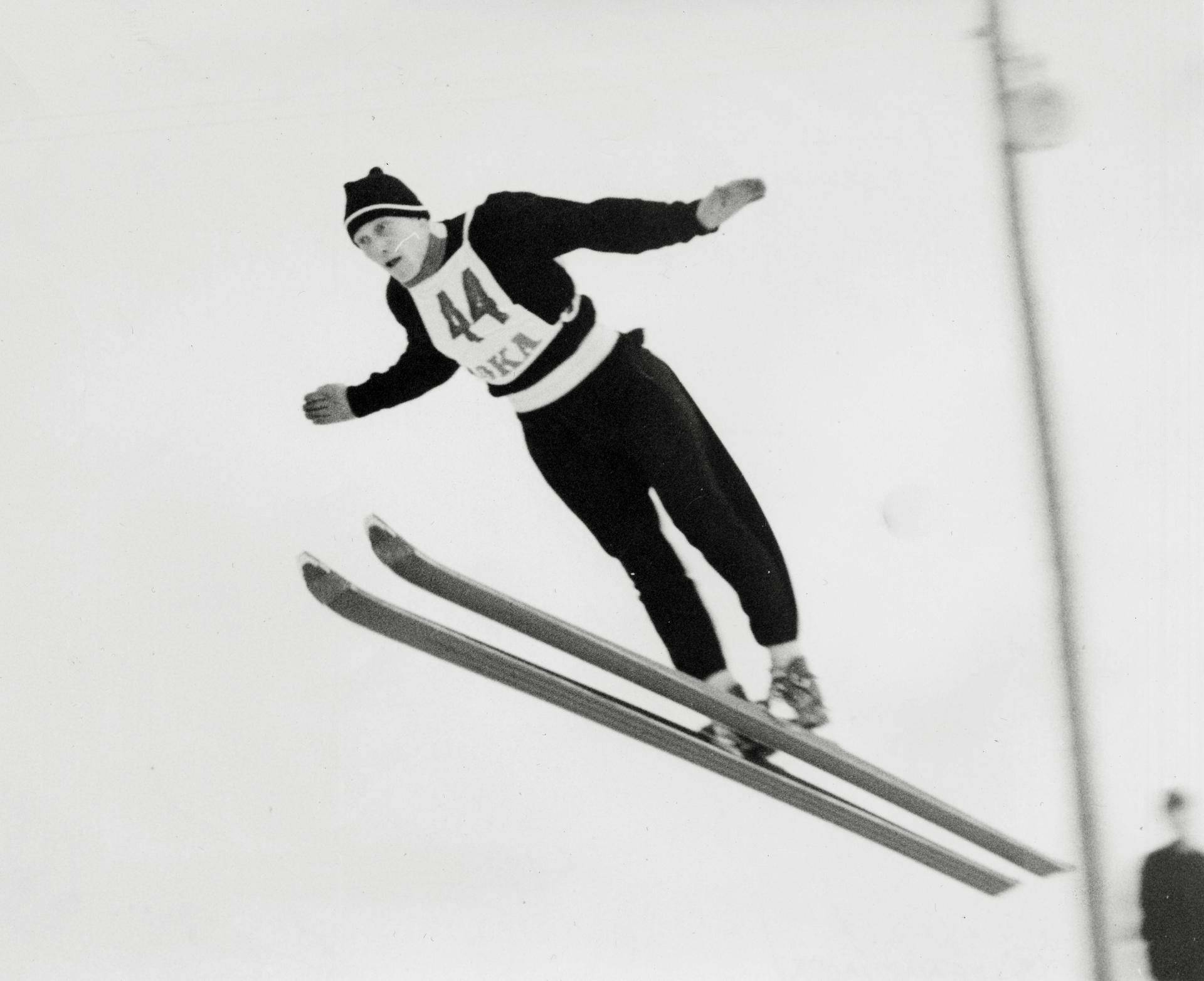
Hemmo-Silvennoinen-1955

Hemmo Valio Silvennoinen (6 November 1932 in Kesälahti – 4 December 2002 in Vantaa) was a Finnish ski jumper who competed from the mid-1950s to the early 1960s. He won the overall event at the 1954-55 Four Hills Tournament, then won the 1955-56 Four Hills event in Garmisch-Partenkirchen.

Silvennoinen also finished tenth in the individual large hill event at the 1956 Winter Olympics in Cortina d'Ampezzo. He also finished fourth in the individual normal hill event at the FIS Nordic World Ski Championships 1962 in Zakopane.
