= Zdeněk Remsa =

Czech ski jumper (1928–2019)

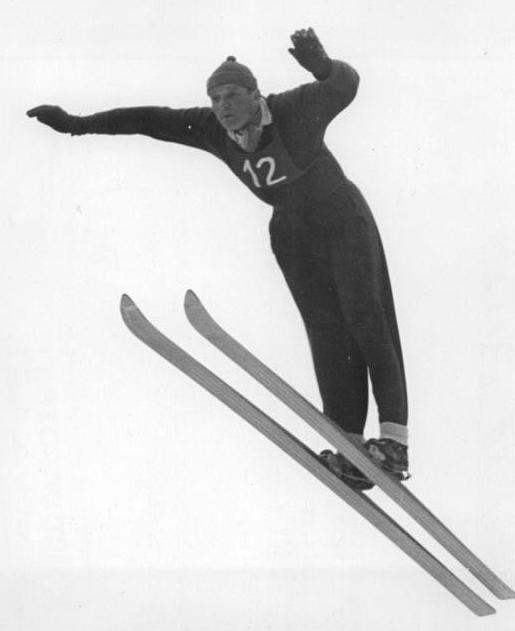
- Zdeněk Remsa in 1953

Personal information
- Nationality: Czech
- Born: 29 December 1928; Horní Branná, Czechoslovakia
- Died: 22 June 2019 (aged 90)

Sport
- Sport: Ski jumping

Zdeněk Remsa (29 December 1928 – 22 June 2019) was a Czech ski jumper. He competed at the 1948 Winter Olympics.
