= Jáchym Bulín =

Czech ski jumper (1934–2021)

Personal information
- Nationality: Czech
- Born: 7 September 1934
- Died: 25 May 2021 (aged 86)

Sport
- Sport: Ski jumping

Jáchym Bulín (7 September 1934 – 25 May 2021) was a Czech ski jumper. He competed in the individual event at the 1956 Winter Olympics.
