= Toni Brutscher =

German ski jumper

Toni Brutscher (born 15 November 1925 in Oberstdorf – 16 November 1983) was a West German ski jumper who competed during the 1950s. He finished fourth in the individual large hill event at the 1952 Winter Olympics in Oslo.

Brutscher's best individual career finish was third twice in the individual normal hill event (1953, 1956).

Toni Brutscher died of cancer in 1983 at the age of 58.
