= Francis Perret =

Swiss ski jumper

Personal information
- Nationality: Swiss
- Born: 15 October 1935 (age 91)

Sport
- Sport: Ski jumping

Francis Perret (born 15 October 1935) is a Swiss ski jumper. He competed in the individual event at the 1956 Winter Olympics.
