= Asbjørn Osnes =

Norwegian ski jumper

Personal information
- Nationality: Norwegian
- Born: 21 April 1932; Hønefoss, Norway
- Died: 22 September 2011 (aged 79)

Sport
- Sport: Ski jumping

Asbjørn Osnes (21 April 1932 – 22 September 2011) was a Norwegian ski jumper.

He placed 18th in the individual ski jump event at the 1956 Winter Olympics in Cortina d'Ampezzo. In 1958 he improved the hill record at Vikersundbakken.

He was born in Hønefoss, represented the club Jevnaker IF and died in Jevnaker.
