= Aulis Kallakorpi =

Finnish ski jumper

Medal record

Men's ski jumping

Representing Finland

Olympic Games
Silver medal – second place	1956 Cortina d'Ampezzo	Individual large hill

World Championships
Silver medal – second place	1956 Cortina d'Ampezzo	Individual large hill

Aulis Kallakorpi (1 January 1929 in Kuusankoski – 15 May 2005 in Mikkeli) was a Finnish ski jumper. He won a silver medal in the Individual large hill event at the 1956 Winter Olympics.

Kallakorpi also won the ski jumping event at the Holmenkollen ski festival in 1955.
