= Nikolay Kamenskiy =

Soviet ski jumper

Medal record

Men's ski jumping

Representing Soviet Union

World Championships
Silver medal – second place	1962 Zakopane	Individual large hill

Nikolay Andreyevich Kamenskiy (Russian: Николай Андреевич Каменский; 17 October 1931 – 21 July 2017) was a Soviet former ski jumper who competed in the late 1950s and early 1960s. He won a silver medal in the individual large hill at the 1962 FIS Nordic World Ski Championships in Zakopane.

Kamenskiy also finished fourth in the individual large hill competition at the 1960 Winter Olympics in Squaw Valley. He also won the ski jump competition at the Holmenollen ski festival in 1958, the Four Hills Tournament in 1956, and two other victories in normal hill events in 1957.
