= Harry Glaß =

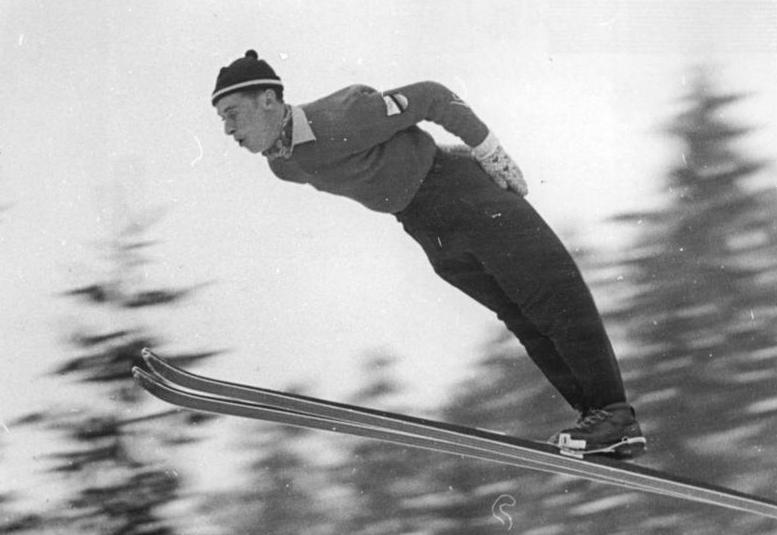
- Glaß performing a ski jump

Personal information
- National team: Germany
- Born: 11 October 1930 Klingenthal, Vogtland, Saxony, Germany
- Died: 13 December 1997 (aged 67) Rodewisch, Vogtland, Saxony, Germany
- Occupations: Policeman, Olympic skier
- Years active: 1952–1960
Medal record
Men's ski jumping
Representing Germany
Olympic Games
Bronze medal – third place	1956 Cortina d'Ampezzo	Individual large hill
World Championships
Bronze medal – third place	1956 Cortina d'Ampezzo	Individual large hill
- Updated on 13 January 2016

Harry Glaß (11 October 1930 – 13 December 1997) was a German ski jumper. Born in Klingenthal, he won a bronze medal in the Individual Large Hill event at the 1956 Winter Olympics.

Glaß, who is not related to fellow East German jumper Henry Glaß of the 1970s, started training as jumper in 1952, and became a member of the GDR-team in 1953. A change in style after 1954 helped him win the medal in 1956. The ski jump career of the Volkspolizei police man, GDR champion of 1954, 1955, 1956 and 1958, ended in 1960 due to a fall during Vierschanzentournee at Bergiselschanze. A later attempt for a comeback failed. He died in Rodewisch in December 1997.
