= Władysław Tajner =

Polish ski jumper

Personal information
- Born: 17 September 1935 Goleszów, Poland
- Died: 27 February 2012 (aged 76) Cieszyn, Poland

Sport
- Sport: Skiing
- Updated on 5 August 2012

Władysław Tajner (17 September 1935 – 27 February 2012) was a Polish ski jumper. He competed at the 1956 and 1960 Winter Olympics.
