= Willi Egger =

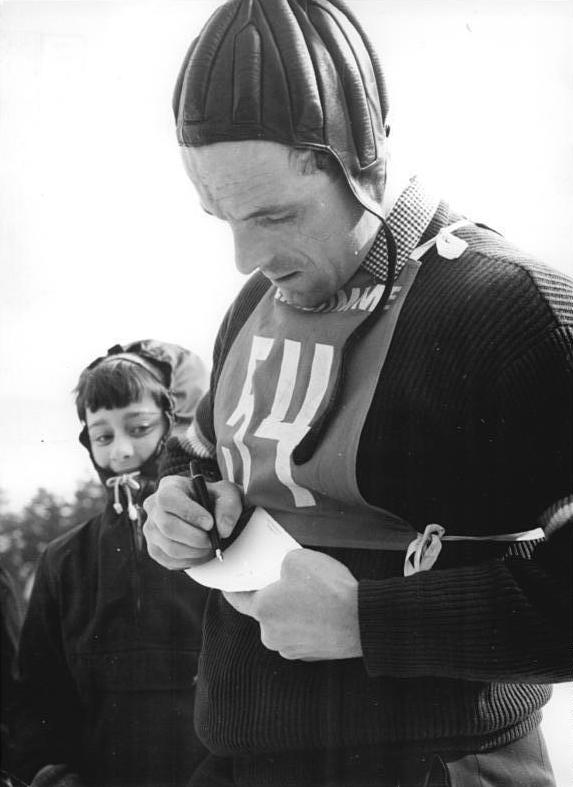
Willi Egger in 1962

Wilhelm "Willi" Egger (7 October 1932 – 29 April 2008) was an Austrian Nordic combined skier and ski jumper who competed from the late 1950s to the mid-1960s.

Born in Murau, he won three events as a ski jumper in the Four Hills Tournament with wins each in Garmisch-Partenkirchen (1957–58), Innsbruck (1961–62), and Bischofshofen (1961–62). Egger also competed in two Winter Olympics, earning his best finish of 12th in the individual large hill event at Innsbruck in 1964.

Egger also finished 16th in the Nordic combined event at the 1956 Winter Olympics in Cortina d'Ampezzo.
