= Georg Thoma =

German skier

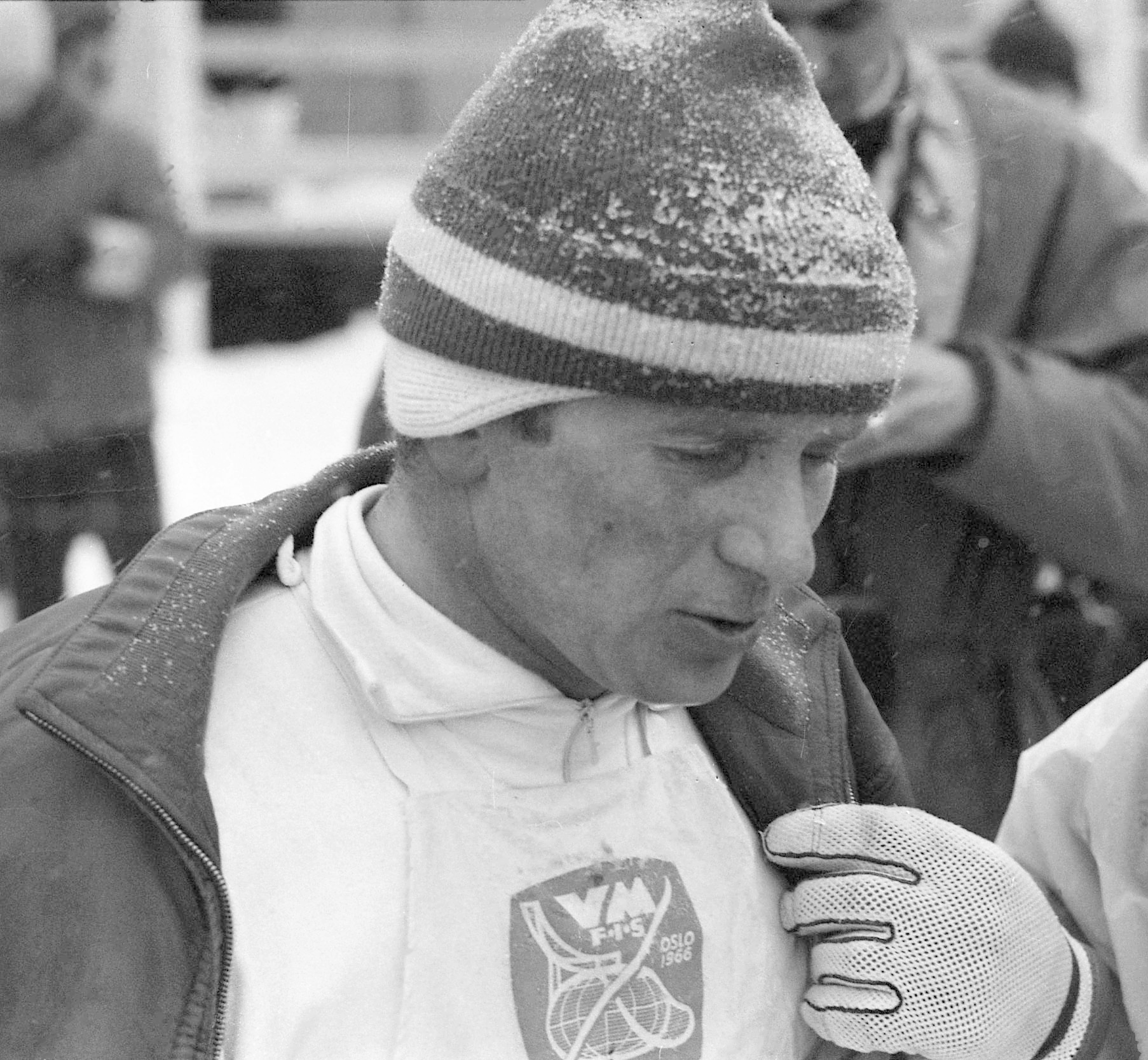
- Thoma at the 1966 World Championships

Personal information
- Born: 20 August 1937 (age 88) Hinterzarten, Germany
- Height: 167 cm (5 ft 6 in)
- Weight: 68 kg (150 lb)

Sport
- Sport: Nordic combined
- Club: SC Hinterzarten
Medal record
Representing Germany
Olympic Games
Gold medal – first place	1960 Squaw Valley	Individual
Bronze medal – third place	1964 Innbruck	Individual
Representing West Germany
World Championships
Gold medal – first place	1966 Oslo	Individual

Georg Thoma, (German pronunciation: [ˈɡeːɔʁk ˈtoːmaː]) born 20 August 1937, is a retired German Nordic combined skier and ski jumper. He won a gold medal at the 1960 Olympics, becoming the first non-Scandinavian athlete to do so, and was voted German Sportsman of the Year. At the 1964 Olympics, he won a bronze medal and served as the Olympic flag bearer for Germany at the opening ceremony. He then won the world championships title in 1966. Thoma's strength in the Nordic combined was jumping. He was three times German champion in ski jumping (1960, 1961, and 1963). Additionally, he won the Nordic combined at the Holmenkollen ski festival from 1963 to 1966. For his Nordic combined successes, Thoma was awarded the Holmenkollen medal in 1964 (ahared with Veikko Kankkonen, Eero Mäntyranta, and Halvor Næs).

Thoma is the uncle of the ski jumper Dieter Thoma. After retiring from competitions he worked as a postman in his hometown, and later as a television commentator. He was one of the first German winter athletes to make his living from sponsorship.

Awards
Preceded by (Germany) Martin Lauer	German Sportsman of the Year; 1960	Succeeded by (Germany) Wolfgang Graf Berghe von Trips
