= Walter Steinegger =

Austrian ski jumper (1928–2022)

Walter Steinegger (5 November 1928 – 12 October 2022) was an Austrian ski jumper who competed from 1952 to 1963. He finished 14th in the individual large hill at the 1952 Winter Olympics in Oslo. He was born in Innsbruck. Steinegger's best career finish was third in the individual normal hill in West Germany in 1957. He also competed in the 1960 Winter Olympics in Squaw Valley as well, finishing 16th in the individual large hill. Steinegger died in Hall in Tirol on 12 October 2022, at the age of 93.
