= Walter Habersatter =

Austrian ski jumper

Walter Habersatter (14 March 1930 in Radstadt – 30 May 2018 in Radstadt) was an Austrian ski jumper who competed from 1955 to 1971.

His biggest success is the second place in the general classification 7th Four Hills Tournament (11th place in Oberstdorf, 10th in Garmisch-Partenkirchen, 5th place in Innsbruck and 1st place in Bischofshofen).

Habersatter also finished 15th in the ski jumping event at the 1956 Winter Olympics in Cortina d'Ampezzo.

His daughter-in-law Brigitte Totschnig won the silver medal in the women's downhill event at the 1976 Winter Olympics in Innsbruck.
