= Josef Kleisl =

German ski jumper

Josef "Sepp" Kleisl (2 February 1929 in Partenkirchen – 25 September 2008 in Garmisch-Partenkirchen) was a West German ski jumper who competed from 1952 to 1959. He finished tenth in the individual large hill event at the 1952 Winter Olympics in Oslo.

Kleisl's best individual career finish was seventh in an individual normal hill event in Austria in 1954.
