= Koba Zakadze =

Georgian ski jumper (born 1934)

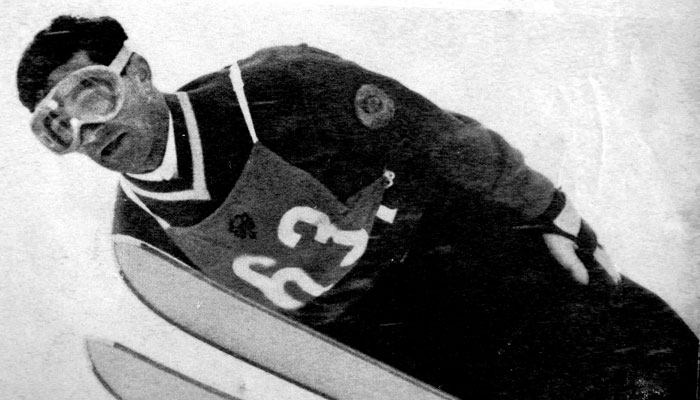
Koba Tsakadze c. 1963

Koba Tsakadze (Georgian: კობა წაქაძე, Russian: Ко́ба Варденови́ч Цака́дзе; born 19 May 1934 in Bakuriani) is a Georgian ski jumper who competed from 1955 to 1972 for the Soviet Union. He won two events at Four Hills Tournament with one in 1955-56 (Innsbruck) and the other in 1960-61 (Garmisch-Partenkirchen).

Tsakadze also competed in two FIS Nordic World Ski Championships, earning his best finish of fifth in the individual normal hill event at Zakopane in 1962.
