= Nikolai Schamov =

Soviet ski jumper (1936–1979)

Nikolay Shamov
Personal information
- Nationality: Soviet
- Born: 22 August 1936 Moscow, Russian SFSR, Soviet Union
- Died: 15 December 1979 (aged 43)

Sport
- Sport: Ski jumping

Nikolai Schamov (Николай Иванович Шамов, 22 August 1936 — 15 December 1979) was a Soviet ski jumper who competed from the late 1950s to the mid-1960s. He won the 1956-7 Four Hills Tournament event at Innsbruck. He also competed at the 1956 Winter Olympics, the 1960 Winter Olympics and the 1964 Winter Olympics.

Schamov died on 15 December 1979, at the age of 43.
