= Helmut Recknagel =

East German ski jumper

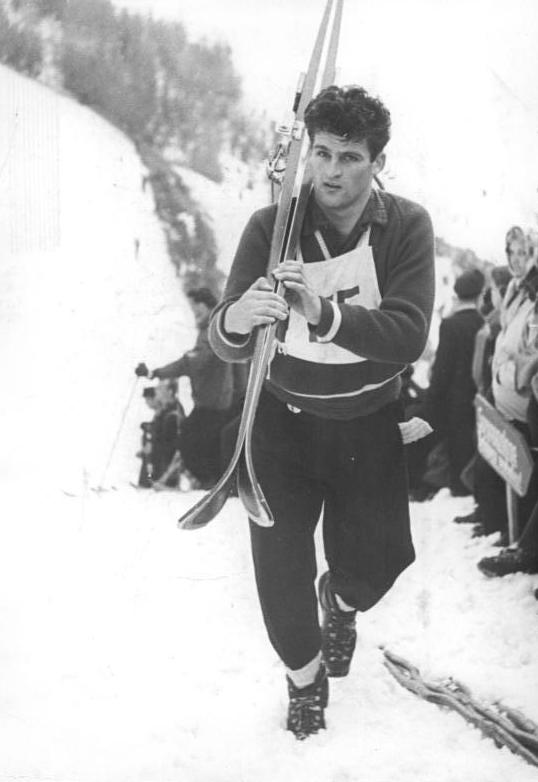

Medal record

Men's ski jumping

Representing Germany

Olympic Games
Gold medal – first place	1960 Squaw Valley	Individual large hill

Representing East Germany

World Championships
Gold medal – first place	1960 Squaw Valley	Individual large hill
Gold medal – first place	1962 Zakopane	Individual large hill
Bronze medal – third place	1958 Lahti	Individual large hill
Bronze medal – third place	1962 Zakopane	Individual normal hill

Helmut Recknagel (born 20 March 1937 in Steinbach-Hallenberg) is an East German former ski jumper who was active in the late 1950s and early 1960s.

He earned a gold medal at the 1960 Winter Olympics in ski jumping and also won the Holmenkollen ski festival ski jumping competition twice (1957 and 1960). Recknagel was the first non-Skandinavian to have won the traditional contest. At the FIS Nordic World Ski Championships, he won three medals: a bronze in 1958 and two medals in 1962, a gold in the individual large hill and a bronze in the individual normal hill. For his ski jumping efforts, Recknagel was awarded the Holmenkollen medal in 1960 (shared with Sixten Jernberg, Sverre Stensheim, and Tormod Knutsen). He was the first German to win the award. Recknagel was furthermore the first athlete to have won the Four Hills Tournament three times and the first to have won five single competitions at this event.

After the end of his career, Recknagel, who was originally a tool and die maker, studied veterinary medicine and obtained one's doctorate in 1973. From 1974 until the end of the GDR he worked in public administration as a veterinarian and controller of hygiene and food. In 1996 Recknagel found a company for assistive technology in Berlin.

== Autobiography ==
- Eine Frage der Haltung. Das Neue Berlin, Berlin 2007, ISBN 978-3-360-01298-2.

Awards
Preceded by Täve Schur	East German Sportsman of the Year; 1962	Succeeded by Klaus Ampler
