= Werner Lesser =

East German ski jumper

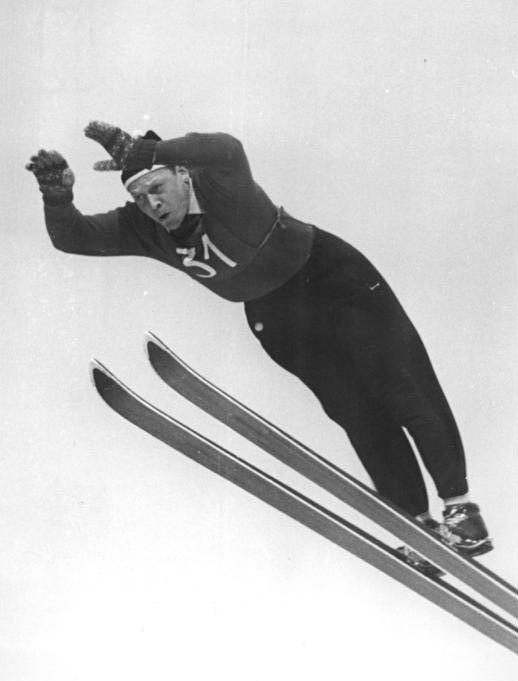
Werner Lesser in Oberhof 1956

Werner Lesser (22 August 1932 in Schmalkalden – 15 January 2005 in Brotterode) was an East German ski jumper who competed in the 1950s. He finished eighth in the individual large hill at the 1956 Winter Olympics in Cortina d'Ampezzo.

Lesser competed for Brotterode in East Germany, and finished third in a ski jumping event in Klingenthal in 1959.
