= Eino Kirjonen =

Finnish ski jumper

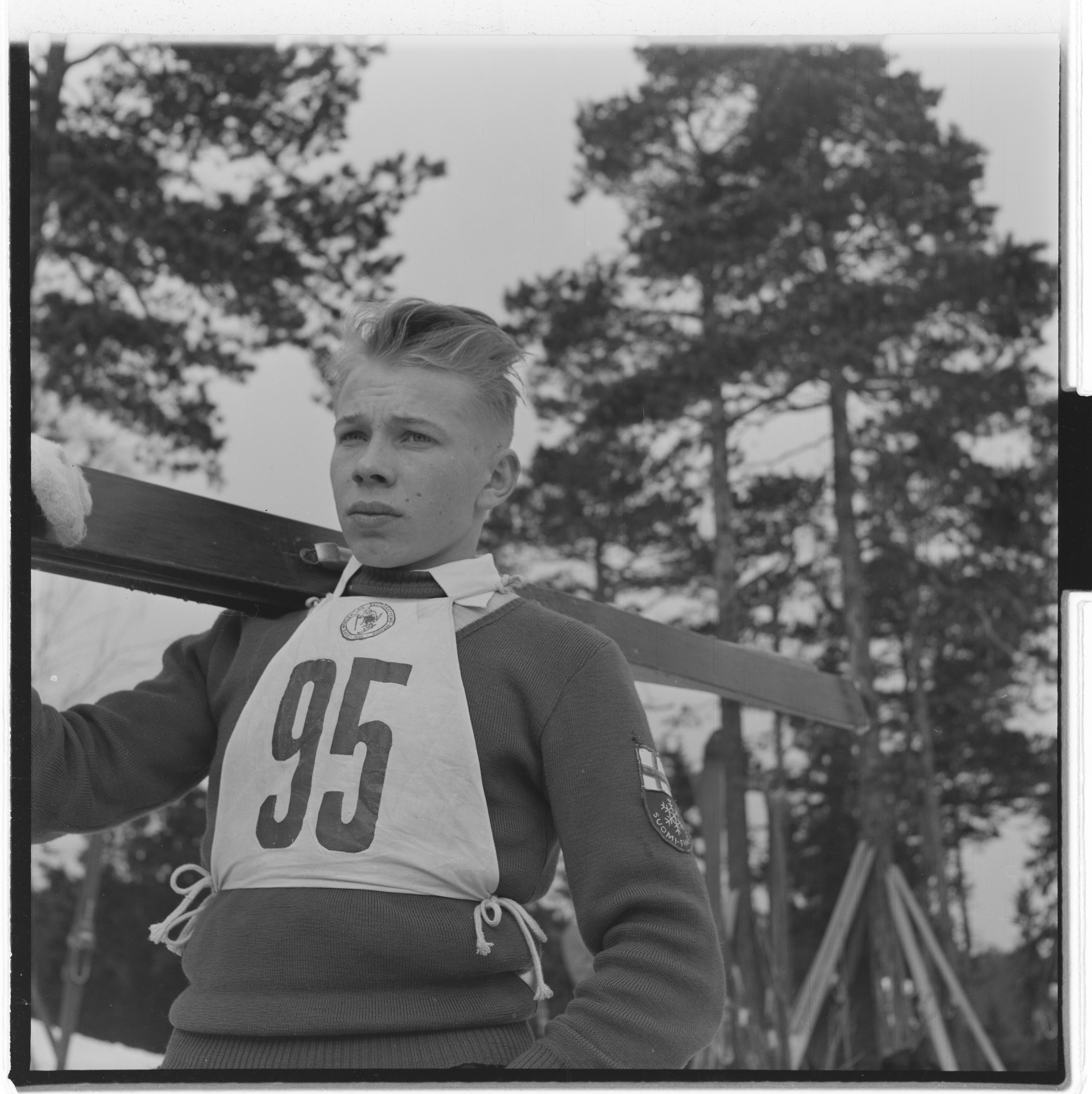
Holmenkollen 1953. - Fo30141603300160

Eino Kirjonen (25 February 1933, in Koivisto – 21 August 1988, in Kouvola) was a Finnish ski jumper who competed from 1954 to 1962. He finished seventh in the individual large hill event at the 1956 Winter Olympics in Cortina d'Ampezzo.

Kirjonen earned a total of three career victories, all in normal hill events (1955, 1957, 1961). He also won the Four Hills Tournament event in 1961–62.
