= Max Bolkart =

German ski jumper (1932–2025)

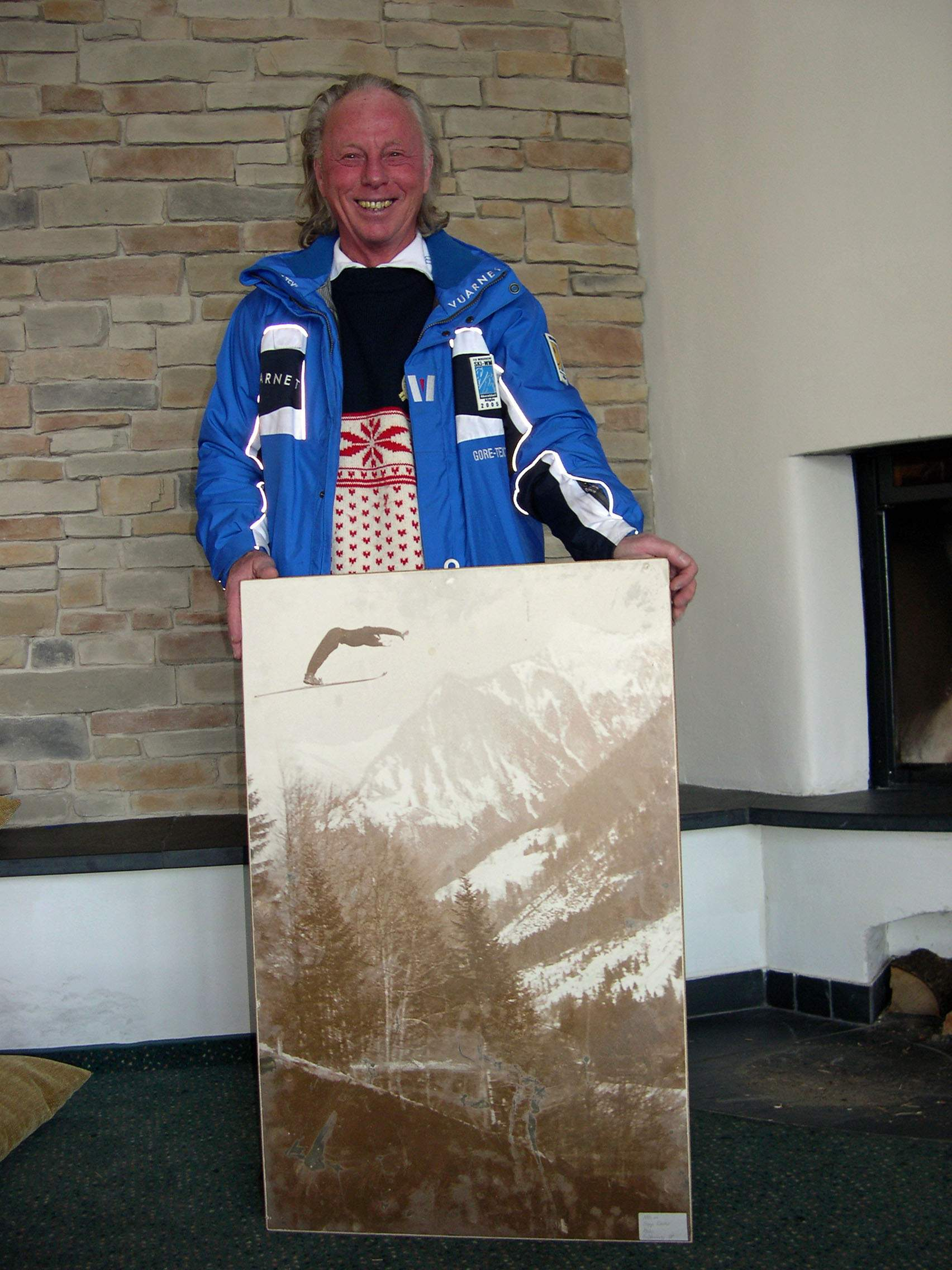

Personal information
- Born: 29 July 1932 Oberstdorf, Bavaria, Germany
- Died: 26 April 2025 (aged 92) Oberstdorf, Bavaria, Germany

Sport
- Country: West Germany
- Sport: Skiing
- Club: SC Oberstdorf

Max Bolkart (29 July 1932 – 26 April 2025) was a West German ski jumper who competed from 1954 to 1966.

== Career ==
Bolkart finished fourth in the individual large hill at the 1956 Winter Olympics in Cortina d'Ampezzo and sixth in the same event at the 1960 Winter Olympics in Squaw Valley.

He is best known as being the winner of the Four Hills Tournament in 1959–60 when he won three of the four events (Oberstdorf, Garmisch-Partenkirchen, and Innsbruck) while finishing fifth in the last event at Bischofshofen. Those three victories were the only ones in his career.

== Death ==
Bolkart died in Oberstdorf, Bavaria, Germany on 26 April 2025, at the age of 92.

== Invalid ski jumping world record ==
Date	Hill	Location	Metres	Feet
23 March 1958	Heini-Klopfer-Skiflugschanze	Oberstdorf, West Germany	139	456

Not recognized! Crashed at world record distance.
