= Otto Leodolter =

Austrian ski jumper (1936–2020)

Medal record

Men's ski jumping

Representing Austria

Olympic Games
Bronze medal – third place	1960 Squaw Valley	Individual Large Hill

World Championships
Bronze medal – third place	1960 Squaw Valley	Individual Large Hill

Otto Leodolter (18 March 1936 in Mariazell – 16 December 2020) was an Austrian ski jumper who competed between 1955 and 1964. His biggest success was a Bronze medal in the Individual Large Hill at the 1960 Winter Olympics in Squaw Valley.

In the Four Hills Tournament, Leodolter achieved overall finishes of second (1960–61) and third (1959–60), though he did not win any single events during those competitions. His other major accomplishments included a 1959 hill record at Holmenkollen (71.5m) and four national titles between 1958 and 1962. Decades later, in 1996, he received the Decoration of Merit in Gold for Services to the Republic of Austria.

Leodolter was the first Austrian to earn a medal in Nordic skiing.

Leodolter died in Ried im Innkreis on 16 December 2020, aged 84.
