= Ski jumping =

Skiing winter sport

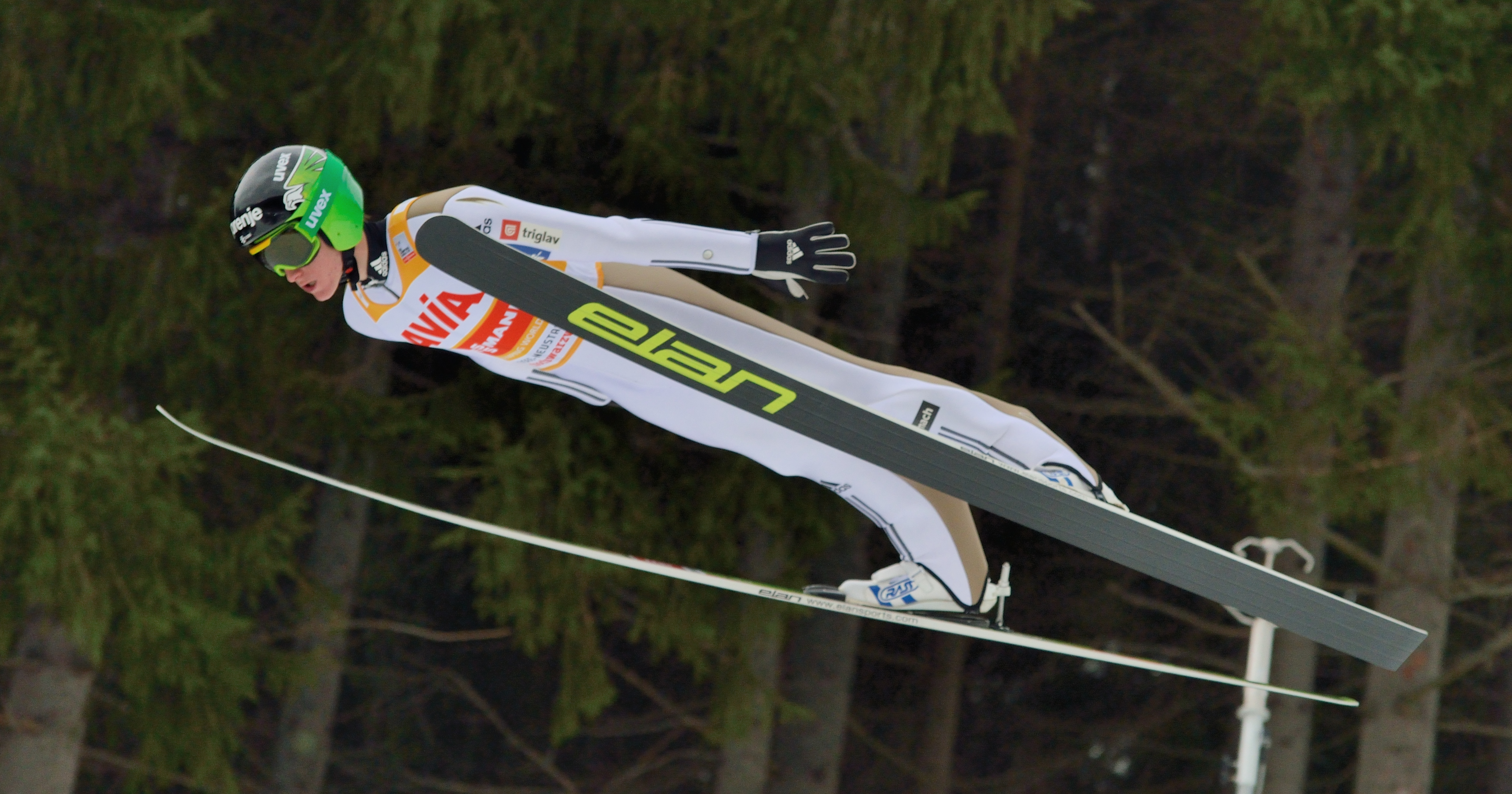
- Peter Prevc in Titisee-Neustadt, March 2016
- Highest governing body: International Ski Federation (FIS)
- First played: 22 November 1808; Olaf Rye, Eidsberg church, Eidsberg, Norway

Characteristics
- Team members: M Individual (50); L Individual (40); Team event (4); Super Team event (2)
- Type: Nordic skiing
- Equipment: Skis
- Venue: Ski jumping hill

Presence
- Olympic: 1924 (men); 2014 (women); 2022 (mixed team)
- World Championships: 1925 (men's nordic); 1972 (ski flying); 2009 (women's nordic)

Pictogram for Ski jumping at the Winter Olympics

Ski jumping is a winter sport in which competitors aim to achieve the farthest jump after sliding down on their skis from a specially designed curved ramp. Along with jump length, the competitor's aerial style and other factors also affect the final score. Ski jumping was first contested in Norway in the late 19th century, and later spread throughout Europe and North America in the early 20th century. Along with cross-country skiing, it constitutes the traditional group of Nordic skiing disciplines.

The ski jumping venue, commonly referred to as a hill, consists of the jumping ramp (in-run), take-off table, and a landing hill. Each jump is evaluated according to the distance covered and the style performed. The distance score is related to the construction point (also known as the K-point), which is a line drawn in the landing area and serves as a "target" for the competitors to reach.

The score of each judge evaluating the style can reach a maximum of 20 points. The jumping technique has evolved over the years, from jumps with the skis parallel and both arms extended forward, to the "V-style", which is widely used today.

Ski jumping has been included at the Winter Olympics since 1924 and at the FIS Nordic World Ski Championships since 1925. Women's participation in the sport began in the 1990s, while the first women's event at the Olympics was held in 2014. All major ski jumping competitions are organised by the International Ski Federation.

Ski jumping is not limited to winter conditions and can also be practiced during the summer months, thanks to specially designed facilities that simulate the snowy environment. In summer ski jumping, the in-run — which is the part of the hill where the jumper gains speed before takeoff — is constructed with tracks made from smooth porcelain materials. The highest level summer competition is the FIS Ski Jumping Grand Prix, contested since 1994.

== History ==
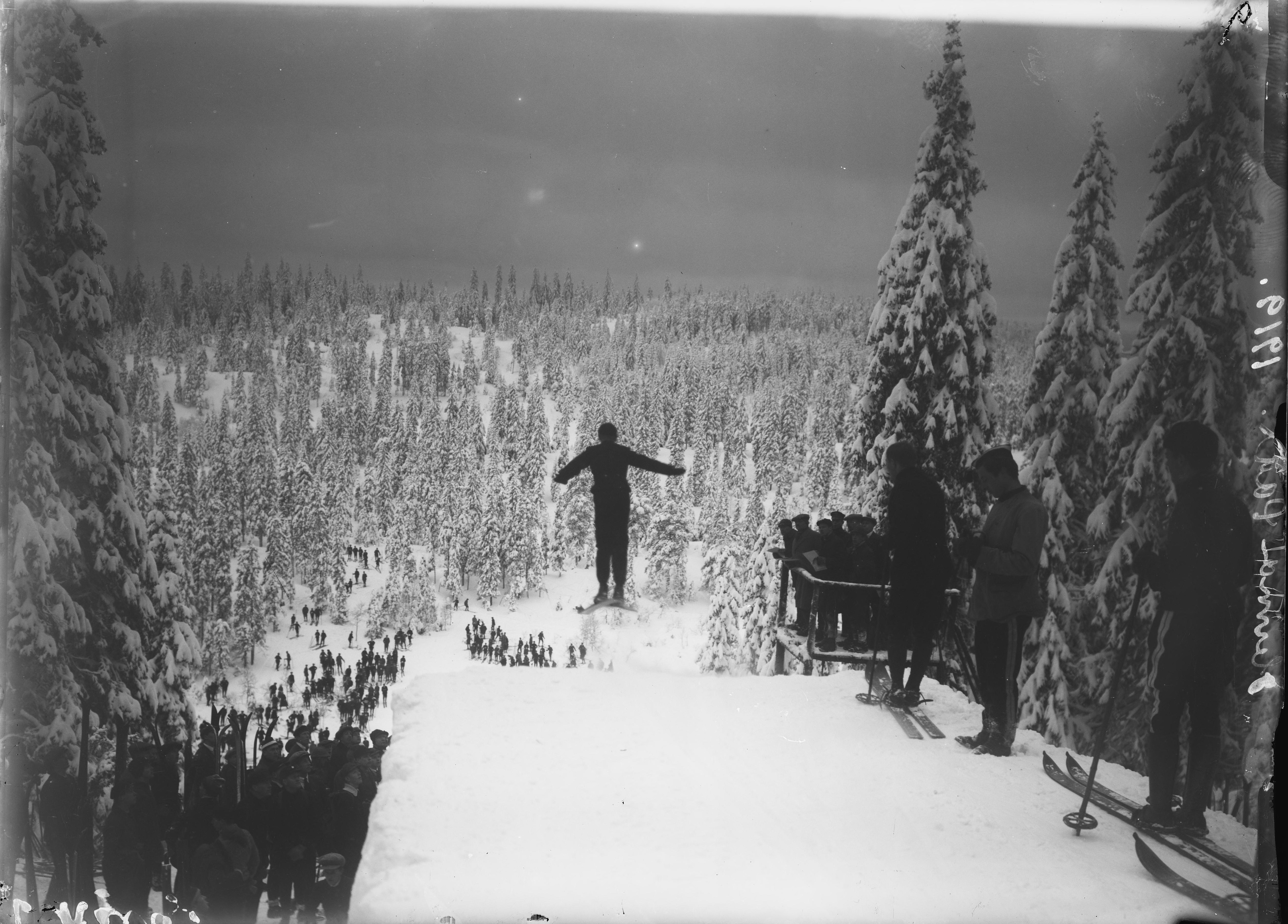
Herman Paus jumping in Hyttlibakken at Tryvannshøgda ca. 1919

Like most of the Nordic skiing disciplines, the first ski jumping competitions were held in Norway in the 19th century, although there is evidence of ski jumping in the late 18th century. The recorded origins of the first ski jump trace back to 1808, when Olaf Rye reached 9.5 m (31 ft). Sondre Norheim, who is regarded as the "father" of the modern ski jumping, won the first-ever ski jumping competition with prizes, which was held in Høydalsmo in 1866.

The first larger ski jumping competition was held on Husebyrennet hill in Oslo, Norway, in 1875. Due to its poor infrastructure and the weather conditions, in 1892 the event was moved to Holmenkollen, which is today still one of the main ski jumping events in the season.

In the late 19th century, Sondre Norheim and Nordic skier Karl Hovelsen immigrated to the United States and started developing the sport in that country. In 1924, ski jumping was featured at the 1924 Winter Olympics in Chamonix, France. The sport has been featured at every Olympics since.

Ski jumping was brought to Canada by Norwegian immigrant Nels Nelsen. Starting with his example in 1915 until late 1959, annual ski jumping competitions were held on Mount Revelstoke — the ski hill Nelsen designed — the longest period of any Canadian ski jumping venue. Revelstoke's was the biggest natural ski jump hill in Canada and internationally recognized as one of the best in North America. The length and natural grade of its 600 m (2,000 ft) hill made possible jumps of over 60 m (200 ft)—the longest in Canada. It was also the only hill in Canada where world ski jumping records were set, in 1916, 1921, 1925, 1932, and 1933.

In 1935, the origins of ski flying began in Planica, Slovenia, where Josef Bradl became the first competitor in history to jump over 100 m (330 ft). At the same venue, the first official jump over 200 m (660 ft) was achieved in 1994, when Toni Nieminen landed at 203 meters.

In 1962 in Zakopane, Poland, the normal hill event was introduced at the FIS Nordic World Ski Championships. Two years later, the normal hill event was included on the Olympic programme at the 1964 Winter Olympics. The team event was added later, at the 1988 Winter Olympics.

== Rules ==
=== Hills ===
Model of a ski jumping hill. A-B – point of departure; t – take-off zone; HS – total hill length; P-L – landing area; K – K-point

A ski jumping hill is typically built on a steep natural slope. It consists of the jumping ramp (in-run), take-off table, and a landing hill. Competitors glide down from a common point at the top of the in-run, achieving considerable speeds at the take-off table, where they take off, carried by their own momentum. While airborne, they maintain an aerodynamic position with their bodies and skis, which allows them to maximise the length of their jump. The landing slope is constructed so that the jumper's trajectory is near-parallel with it, and the athlete's relative height to the ground is gradually lost, allowing for a gentle and safe landing. The landing space is followed by an out-run, a substantial flat or counter-inclined area that permits the skier to safely slow down. The out-run area is fenced and surrounded by a public auditorium.

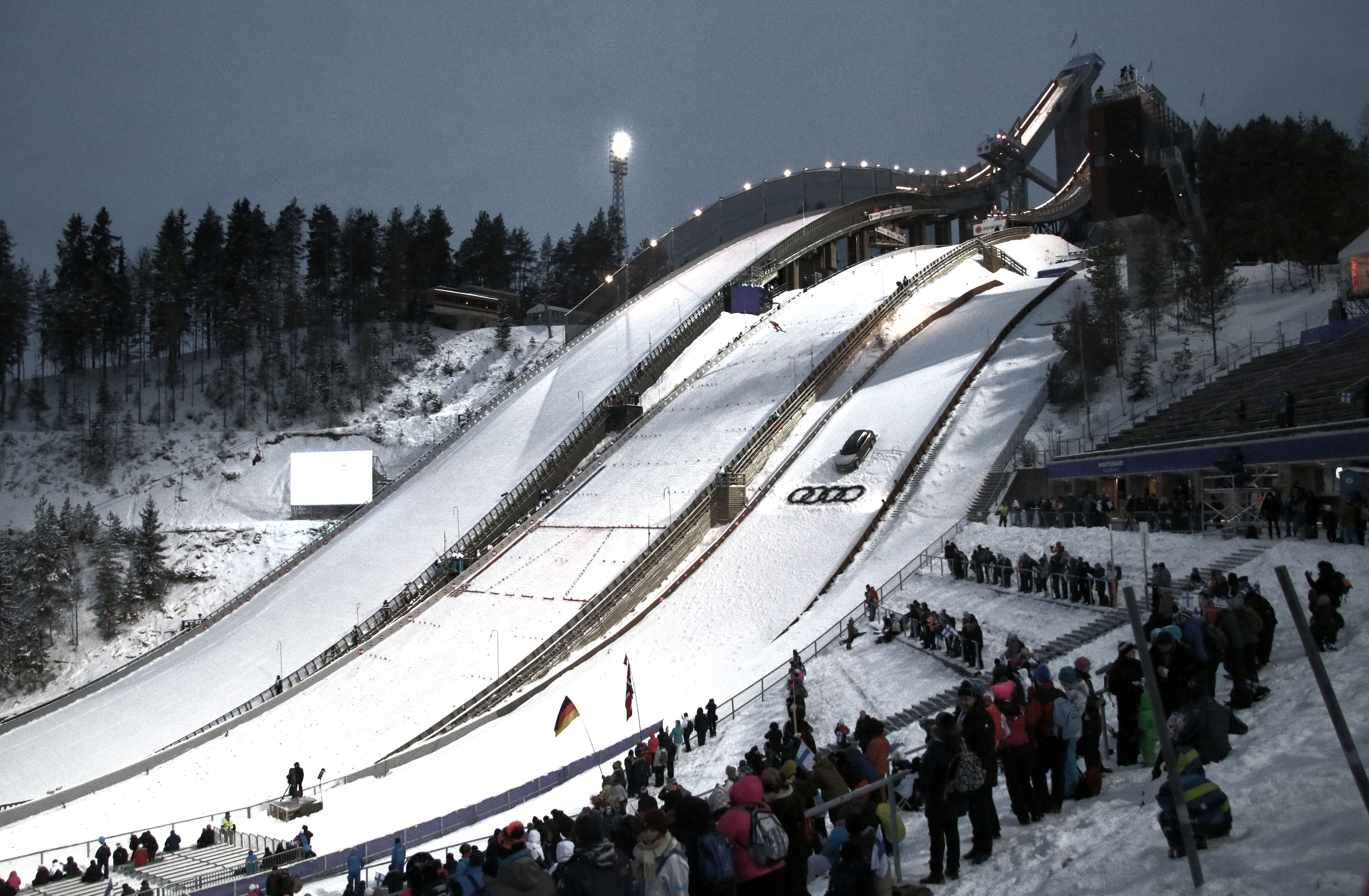
The Salpausselkä ski jumping hill in Lahti, Finland

The slopes are classified according to the distance that the competitors travel in the air, between the end of the table and the landing. Each hill has a construction point (K-point), which serves as a "target" that the competitors should reach. The classification of the hills are as follows:

Class	Construction point	Hill size
Small hill	to 45 meters	to 49 meters
Medium hill	45–74 m	50–84 m
Normal hill	75–99 m	85–109 m
Large hill	100–130 m	110–149 m
Giant hill	131–169 m	150–184 m
Ski flying hill	over 170 m	over 185 m

=== Scoring system ===
Competitors are ranked according to a numerical score obtained by adding up components based on distance, style, inrun length (gate factor) and wind conditions. In the individual event, the scores from each skier's two competition jumps are combined to determine the winner.

Distance score depends on the hill's K-point. For K-90 and K-120 competitions, the K-point is set at 90 meters and 120 meters, respectively. Competitors are awarded 60 points (normal and large hills) and 120 points (flying hills) if they land on the K-point. For every meter beyond or below the K-point, extra points are awarded or deducted; the typical value is 2 points per meter in small hills, 1.8 points in large hills and 1.2 points in ski flying hills. A competitor's distance is measured between the takeoff and the point where the feet came in full contact with the landing slope (for abnormal landings, touchpoint of one foot, or another body part is considered). Jumps are measured with accuracy of 0.5 meters for all competitions.

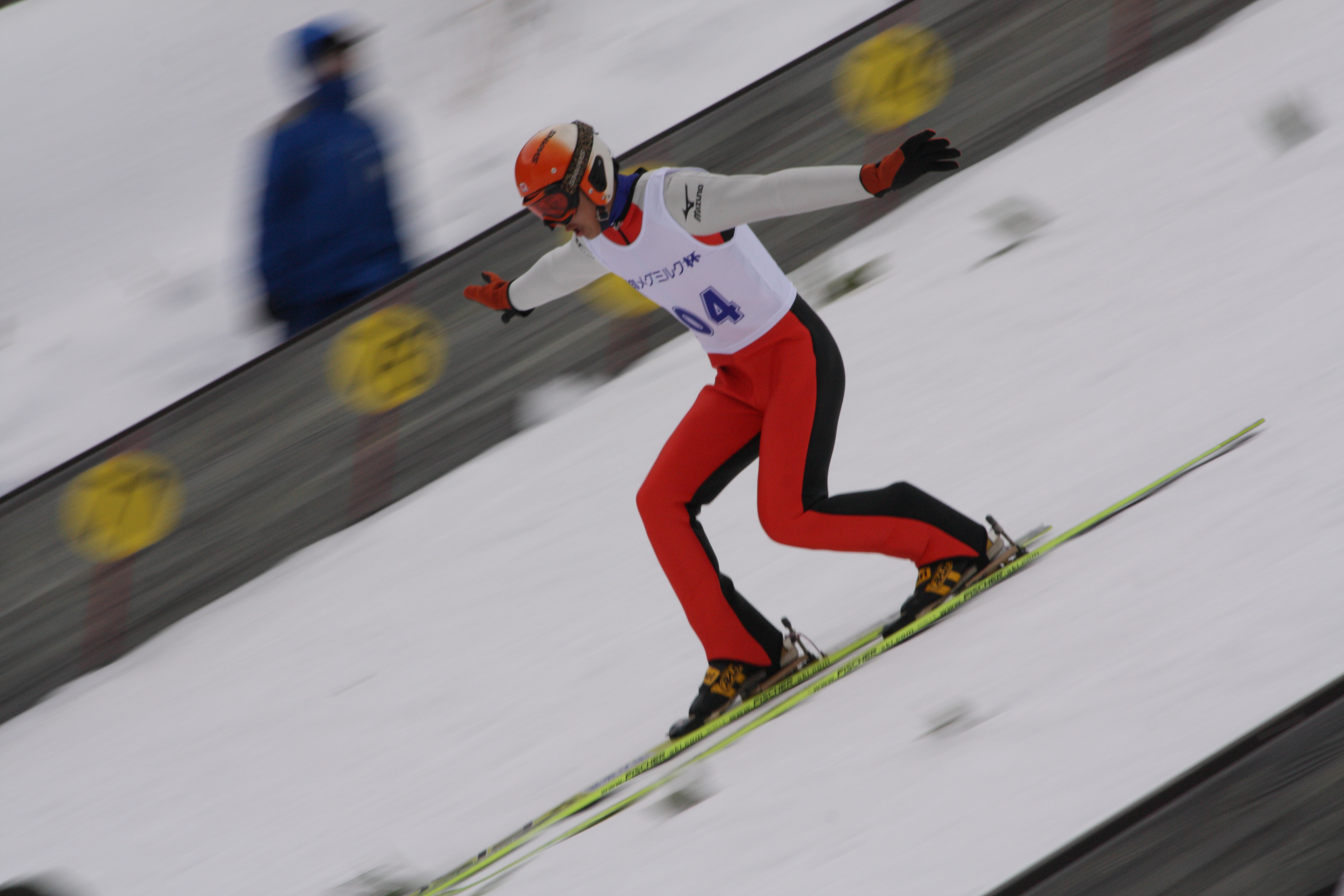
Telemark landing

During the competition, five judges are based in a tower to the side of the expected landing point. They can award up to 20 points each for jumping style, based on keeping the skis steady during flight, balance, optimal body position, and landing. The highest and lowest style scores are disregarded, with the remaining three scores added to the distance score.

Gate and wind factors were introduced by the 2009 rules, to allow fairer comparison of results for a scoring compensation for variable outdoor conditions. Aerodynamics and take-off speed are important variables that affect the jump length, and if weather conditions change during a competition, the conditions will not be the same for all competitors. Gate factor is an adjustment made when the inrun (or start gate) length is adjusted from the initial position in order to provide optimal take-off speed. Since higher gates result in higher take-off speeds, and therefore present an advantage to competitors, points are subtracted when the starting gate is moved up, and added when the gate is lowered. An advanced calculation also determines compensation points for the actual unequal wind conditions at the time of the jump; when there is back wind, points are added, and when there is front wind, points are subtracted. Wind speed and direction are measured at five different points based on average value, which is determined before every competition.

If two or more competitors finish the competition with the same number of points, they are given the same placing and receive same prizes. Ski jumpers below the minimum safe body mass index are penalised with a shorter maximum ski length, reducing the aerodynamic lift they can achieve. These rules have been credited with stopping the most severe cases of underweight athletes, but some competitors still lose weight to maximise the distance they can achieve. In order to prevent an unfair advantage due to a "sailing" effect of the ski jumping suit, material, thickness and relative size of the suit are regulated.

== Techniques ==
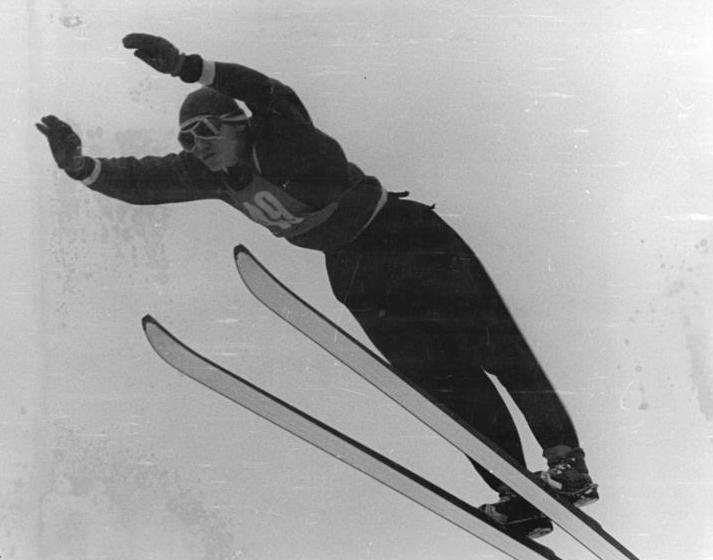
Kongsberger technique, used in 1920s to 1950s.

Each jump is divided into four parts: in-run, take-off (jump), flight, and landing.

By using the V-style, firstly pioneered by Swedish ski jumper Jan Boklöv in the mid-1980s, modern skiers are able to exceed the distance of the take-off hill by about 10% compared to the previous technique with parallel skis. Previous techniques included the Kongsberger technique, the Windisch technique, and the Däscher technique. Until the mid-1960s, the ski jumper came down the in-run of the hill with both arms pointing forwards. This changed when the Windisch technique was pioneered by Erich Windisch in the 1949 as a modification of the Kongsberger technique, further modified in the 1950s by the Däscher technique (parallel style), pioneered by Andreas Däscher. A lesser-used technique as of 2017 is the H-style which is essentially a combination of the parallel and V-styles, in which the skis are spread very wide apart and held parallel in an "H" shape. It is prominently used by Domen Prevc.

Skiers are required to touch the ground in the Telemark landing style (Norwegian: telemarksnedslag), named after the Norwegian county of Telemark. This involves the landing with one foot in front of the other with knees slightly bent, mimicking the style of Telemark skiing. Failure to execute a Telemark landing leads to the deduction of style points, issued by the judges.

== Major competitions ==
All major ski jumping competitions are organised by the International Ski Federation.

The large hill ski jumping event was included at the Winter Olympic Games for the first time in 1924, and has been contested at every Winter Olympics since then. The normal hill event was added in 1964. Since 1992, the normal hill event is contested at the K-90 size hill; previously, it was contested at the K-60 hill. Women's debuted at the Winter Olympics in 2014.

The FIS Ski Jumping World Cup has been contested since the 1979–80 season. It runs between November and March every season, and consists of 25–30 competitions at most prestigious hills across Europe, United States and Japan. Competitors are awarded a fixed number of points in each event according to their ranking, and the overall winner is the one with most accumulated points. FIS Ski Flying World Cup is contested as a sub-event of the World Cup, and competitors collect only the points scored at ski flying hills from the calendar.

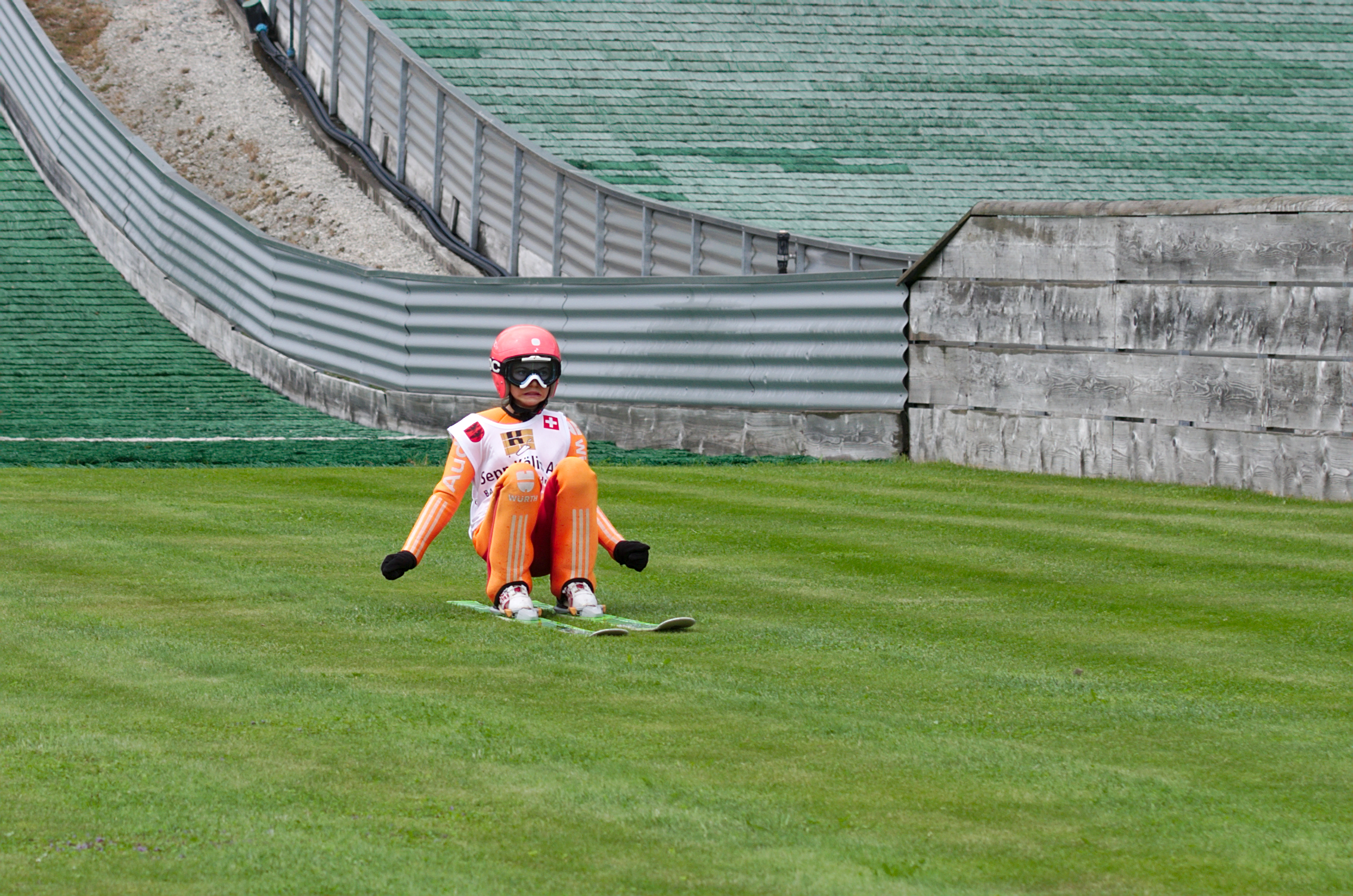
A ski jumper after landing on a hill equipped for summer events

The ski jumping at the FIS Nordic World Ski Championships was first contested in 1925. The team event was introduced in 1982, while the women's event was first held in 2009.

The FIS Ski Flying World Championships was first contested in 1972 in Planica.

The Four Hills Tournament has been contested since the 1952–53 season. It is contested around the New Year's Day at four venues – two in Germany (Oberstdorf and Garmisch-Partenkirchen) and two in Austria (Innsbruck and Bischofshofen), which are also scored for the World Cup. Those events are traditionally held in a slightly different format than other World Cup events (first round is held as a knockout event between 25 pairs of jumpers), and the overall winner is determined by adding up individual scores from every jump.

Other competitions organised by the International Ski Federation include the FIS Ski Jumping Grand Prix (held in summer), Continental Cup, FIS Cup, FIS Race, and Alpen Cup.

== Women's participation ==
In January 1863 in Trysil Municipality, Norway, at that time 16 years old Norwegian Ingrid Olsdatter Vestby, became the first-ever known female ski jumper, who participated in the competition. Her distance is not recorded.

Women began competing at the high level since the 2004–05 Continental Cup season. International Ski Federation organised three women's team events in this competition.

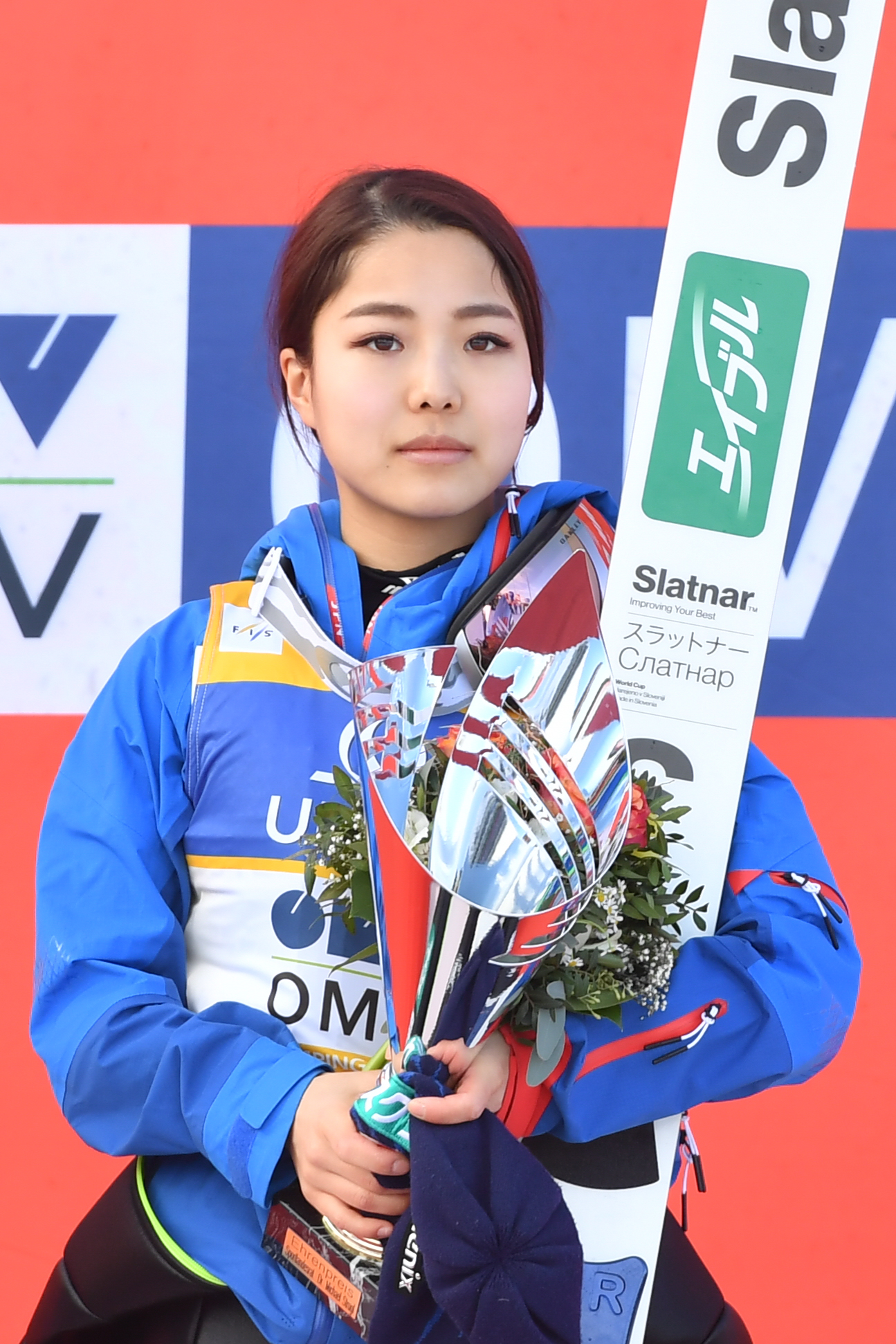
Sara Takanashi is the most successful female ski jumper, winning the World Cup title on four occasions.

Women's made a premiere FIS Nordic World Ski Championships performance in 2009 in Liberec. American ski jumper Lindsey Van became the first world champion.

In the 2011–12 season, women competed for the first time in the World Cup. The first event was held on 3 December 2011 at Lysgårdsbakken at normal hill in Lillehammer, Norway. The first-ever female World Cup winner was Sarah Hendrickson, who also became the inaugural women's World Cup overall champion. Previously, women had only competed in Continental Cup seasons.

In the 2022–23 season, women competed for the first time ever in ski flying. The historic event was held in Vikersundbakken in Vikersund on 19 March 2023. It was won by Slovenian jumper Ema Klinec.

=== Olympic Games ===
In 2006, the International Ski Federation proposed that women could compete at the 2010 Winter Olympics, but the proposal was rejected by the IOC because of the low number of athletes and participating countries at the time.

A group of 15 competitive female ski jumpers later filed a suit against the Vancouver Organizing Committee for the 2010 Olympic and Paralympic Winter Games on the grounds that it violated the Canadian Charter of Rights and Freedoms since men were competing. The suit failed, as the judge ruled that the situation was not governed by the charter.

A further milestone was reached when women's ski jumping was included as part of the 2014 Winter Olympics at the normal hill event. The first Olympic champion was Carina Vogt. The Nordic Combined, which combines cross-country skiing and ski jumping, does not include a women's event.

== Record jumps ==
Planica (SLO)	Sepp Bradl (AUT)	Daniela Iraschko (AUT)
350x	250x	200x
current world records for both men and women	the first to officially surpassed 100 m in 1936	First ever female who surpassed 200 meters

Since 1936, when the first jump beyond 100 metres (330 ft) was made, all world records in the sport have been made in the discipline of ski flying. On 30 March 2025 the official world record for the longest ski jump was set at 254.5 m (835 ft), by Domen Prevc at Letalnica bratov Gorišek in Planica, Slovenia, and is the longest jump ever measured in an official competition. In a non-official event near Akureyri on Iceland, in April 2024 Ryōyū Kobayashi achieved a distance of 291 m (955 ft) after 10 seconds in the air and landing smoothly. It was an unofficial world record which is not being counted as a ski flying world record by the FIS.

Nika Prevc holds the women's world record at 242,5 metres (795 feet), set on 27 March 2026 in Letalnica bratov Gorišek in Planica

The lists below show the progression of world records through history at 50-meter milestones. Only official results are listed; invalid jumps are not included.

=== Men ===
First jump	Date		Country	Hill	Place	Meters	Feet
in history	1808-11-22	Olaf Rye	Denmark; Norway	Eidsberg church	Eidsberg, Norway	9.4	31
over 50 m	1913-02-16	Ragnar Omtvedt	United States	Curry Hill	Ironwood, Michigan, United States	51.5	169
over 100 m	1936-03-15	Sepp Bradl	Austria	Bloudkova velikanka	Planica, Slovenia	101.5	340
over 150 m	1967-02-11	Lars Grini	Norway	Heini-Klopfer-Skiflugschanze	Oberstdorf, West Germany	150.0	492
over 200 m	1994-03-17	Toni Nieminen	Finland	Velikanka bratov Gorišek	Planica, Slovenia	203.0	666
over 250 m	2015-02-14	Peter Prevc	Slovenia	Vikersundbakken	Vikersund, Norway	250.0	820

=== Women ===
First jump	Date		Country	Hill	Place	Meters	Yards	Feet
in history	1863	Ingrid Olsdatter Vestby	Norway	Nordbybakken	Trysil, Norway	unknown		
over 50 meters	1932	Johanne Kolstad	Norway	Gråkallbakken	Trondheim, Norway	62.0	67.8	203
over 100 meters	1981-03-29	Tiina Lehtola	Finland	Rukatunturi	Kuusamo, Finland	110.0	120.3	361
over 150 meters	1994-02-05	Eva Ganster	Austria	Kulm	Tauplitz/Bad Mitterndorf, Austria	161.0	176.1	528
over 200 meters	2003-01-29	Daniela Iraschko	Austria	Kulm	Tauplitz/Bad Mitterndorf, Austria	200.0	218.7	656

=== Tandem ===
First jump	Date		Country	Hill	Place	Meters	Yards	Feet
in history	2016-02-18	Rok Urbanc; Jaka Rus	Slovenia; Slovenia	Planica Nordic Center HS45	Planica, Slovenia	35.0	38.3	115

=== Perfect-score jumps ===
Those who have managed to show a perfect jump, which means that all five judges attributed the maximum style score of 20 points for their jumps. Kazuyoshi Funaki, Sven Hannawald and Wolfgang Loitzl were attributed 4x20 (plus another 19.5) style score points for their second jump, thus receiving nine times the maximum score of 20 points within one competition. Kazuyoshi Funaki and Daniel Tschofenig are the only jumpers in history who achieved this more than once. So far only ten jumpers have achieved a perfect score:

No.	Date		Rank	Hill	Location	Competition	Meters	Feet
1	1976-03-07	(Austria) Anton Innauer	1st	Heini-Klopfer-Skiflugschanze K175	Oberstdorf	KOP International Ski Flying Week	176.0	577
2	1998-01-24	(Japan) Kazuyoshi Funaki	2nd	Heini-Klopfer-Skiflugschanze K185	Oberstdorf	World Cup / World Championships	187.5	615
3	1998-01-25	(Japan) Kazuyoshi Funaki	1st	Heini-Klopfer-Skiflugschanze K185	Oberstdorf	World Cup / World Championships	205.5	674
4	1998-02-15	(Japan) Kazuyoshi Funaki	1st	Hakuba K120	Nagano	Olympic Games	132.5	438
5	1999-01-17	(Japan) Kazuyoshi Funaki	2nd	Wielka Krokiew K116	Zakopane	World Cup	119.0	390
6	2003-02-08	(Germany) Sven Hannawald	1st	Mühlenkopfschanze K130	Willingen	World Cup	142.0	466
7	2003-02-08	(Japan) Hideharu Miyahira	6th	Mühlenkopfschanze K130	Willingen	World Cup	135.5	445
8	2009-01-06	(Austria) Wolfgang Loitzl	1st	Paul-Ausserleitner-Schanze HS140	Bischofshofen	Four Hills Tournament	142.5	468
9	2015-03-20	(Slovenia) Peter Prevc	1st	Letalnica bratov Gorišek HS225	Planica	World Cup	233.0	764
10	2015-03-22	(Slovenia) Jurij Tepeš	1st	Letalnica bratov Gorišek HS225	Planica	World Cup	244.0	801
11	2025-03-28	(Austria) Daniel Tschofenig	4th	Letalnica bratov Gorišek HS240	Planica	World Cup	233.5	766
12	2026-03-29	(Germany) Andreas Wellinger	11th	Letalnica bratov Gorišek HS240	Planica	World Cup	238.5	782
13	2026-03-29	(Norway) Marius Lindvik	1st	Letalnica bratov Gorišek HS240	Planica	World Cup	238.5	782
14	2026-03-29	(Austria) Daniel Tschofenig	4th	Letalnica bratov Gorišek HS240	Planica	World Cup	238.0	781

== Health risks ==
Ski jumping risks include serious injuries such as bone fractures (Steinar Bråten, Masahiro Akimoto, John Lockyer, Ulrike Gräßler) or concussions (Simon Ammann, Thomas Morgenstern, Eva Pinkelnig, Sondre Ringen). Paul Ausserleitner was one athlete among others, who died after an accident on the hill. Pekka Salo from Finland, Nicholas Fairall, Lukas Müller and the Swiss Nordic combined skier Matthias Lötscher suffered paralyses after crashes. Other jumpers with chronic disabilities after failed jumps are Rolf Åge Berg and Thomas Diethart.

Modern ski jumping is notorious for an increasing number of knee injuries, especially of the cruciate ligament. The ski bindings and the tabs under the jumping shoes (respectively the tabs' size) are often named as the reason, for example by Mario Stecher, Lukas Müller, former equipment controller Sepp Gratzer, Werner Schuster, Johan Remen Evensen, Eirin Maria Kvandal and Stefan Hula Jr.. Earlier, crashes were usually considered as the reason for injuries. A popular athlete of the parallel-style-era, who had to end his career due to knee problems, was Walter Steiner.

Athletes like Sven Hannawald and Thomas Morgenstern also talked openly about the mental pressure of the sport. Hannawald retired because of occupational burnout.

=== Eating disorders ===
After the V-style was established, the period of flying became more relevant in relation to the take-off. It became advantageous for ski jumpers to have a very low body weight. The problem was first publicized by Stephan Zünd, who suffered from anorexia nervosa. Other cases were Christian Moser and Norwegian Henriette Smeby. Sven Hannawald was suspected to have the same disorder. Janne Ahonen also reported in his autobiography about the strict diet program. In the mid-1990s the Austrian Ski Federation doctor Peter Baumgartl talked about having heard of cases in the German and Norwegian team. In late 1996 Dieter Thoma talked in an interview about trainers putting athletes under pressure to gain a low body weight.

In 2004 the FIS announced a new rule which requires the length of an athletes skis to be shortened when an athlete has a BMI under 20 (today under 21). Originally it was just obligatory for men but is nowadays used for both genders. The rule's efficacy is often doubted, because the cut ski can be compensated with a low body weight and modern ski bindings. Current and former ski jumpers, who have talked critically about the topic, include Andreas Felder, Øyvind Berg, Reinhard Heß, Frank Löffler, Michael Möllinger, Janne Ahonen, Michael Neumayer, Martin Schmitt, Anton Innauer, Alexander Pointner, Andreas Bauer, Maren Lundby, Lindsey Van, Christoph Eugen, Andreas Goldberger, Jens Weißflog, Simon Ammann, Gregor Deschwanden, Bor Pavlovčič, Anders Jacobsen, Christian Meyer, Thomas Thurnbichler, Alexander Stöckl, Sven Hannawald, Dominik Peter, Silje Opseth,Katharina Schmid and Agnes Reisch. Gregor Deschwanden and Maren Lundby suggested a fixed lower bound for the BMI, in 2025 Silje Opseth also proposed a change of the current rule. After his retirement in 2006, Daniel Forfang had stood in the focus of a discussion about the low body weight in ski jumping and the unsatisfying influence of the BMI-rule. In 2012 the then ski flying world record holder Johan Remen Evensen ended his career due to weight problems.

In 2022 the ski federation of Poland was criticized for stopping the financial support of female jumpers with an BMI above 21. In this context, Polish ski jumper Anna Twardosz talked openly about suffering from depression and bulimia nervosa; Kamila Karpiel took a break of almost two years because of the rule. Too small amount of food can cause the relative energy deficiency in sport (for example, Maren Lundby) and, in the cases of female jumpers, dysmenorrhea. A critical observer from science is Jorunn Sundgot-Borgen.

See also List of ski flying accidents.

== See also ==
- Ski flying
- Nordic combined
- FIS Ski Jumping World Cup
- FIS Ski Flying World Cup
- Ski jumping at the Winter Olympics
- List of Olympic medalists in ski jumping
- List of FIS Nordic World Ski Championships medalists in ski jumping
- List of Four Hills Tournament winners
- Medicinernes Skiklub Svartor
