= Windisch =

Windisch may refer to:

- Windisch (surname) (including a list of people with the name)
- Windisch, Switzerland, a municipality in the canton of Aargau
- Windisch (ethnonym), German word Wends for Slavs
- Windisch Kamnitz, German name of Srbská Kamenice, a village in the Czech Republic, Ústí nad Labem Region
- Windisch-Feistritz, German name of Slovenska Bistrica, a town south of Maribor in eastern Slovenia
- Windisch technique, a ski jumping technique
