= Wendish =

Wendish may refer to:

- Wends, a historical name for Slavs who inhabited present-day north-east Germany
- Sorbian languages, languages spoken by the Sorbs, a West Slavic minority in the Lusatia region of Eastern Germany
- Prekmurje Slovene, a Slovene dialect

== See also ==
- Windisch (disambiguation)
