= Paul Ausserleitner =

Austrian ski jumper

- Born: 3 February 1925; Bischofshofen
- Died: 9 January 1952 (aged 26); Bischofshofen
- Occupation: ski jumper

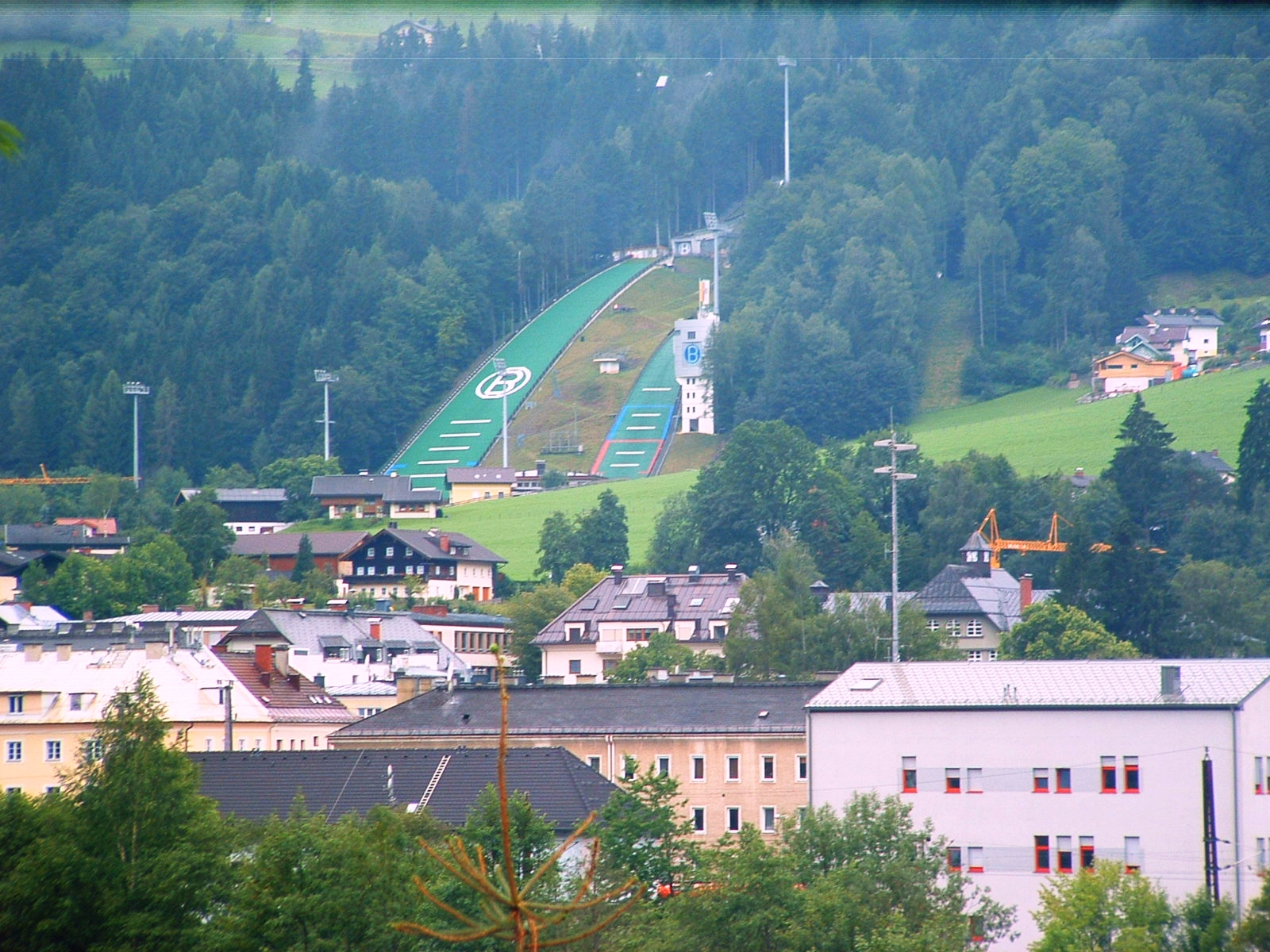
Bischofshofen showing the Paul-Ausserleitner-Schanze ski jump.

Paul Ausserleitner (3 February 1925 – 9 January 1952) was an Austrian ski jumper. He died in an accident in Bischofshofen's ski jumping hill while on a training jump in 1952. To honour his memory, the hill was renamed after the accident to Paul-Ausserleitner-Schanze. Ausserleitner holds the hill record in the K-50 hill in Gaisberg, Salzburg with 55 metres (achieved in 1949). The Gaisberg hill was later destroyed.
