= Windisch (surname) =

Windisch is a German surname. Notable people with the surname include:

- Albert Windisch (1878–1967) German painter and typographer
- Alois Windisch (1888–1958), Austrian military officer
- Erich Windisch (1918–2007), German ski jumper
- Ernst Windisch (1844–1918), German scholar, linguist and Celticist
- Karl Gottlieb von Windisch (1725–1793), Mayor of Pressburg, historian and writer
- Markus Windisch (born 1984), Italian biathlete
- Rudolf Windisch (1897–1918), World War I fighter ace
- Veronika Windisch (born 1982), Austrian speed skater

== See also ==
- Windisch-Graetz, a princely family in the Austrian Empire
