= Eidsberg Church =

Church in Eidsberg, Østfold, Norway

Coordinates: 59.5199°N 11.2575°E

Eidsberg Church Eidsberg kirke
- Østfold-domen
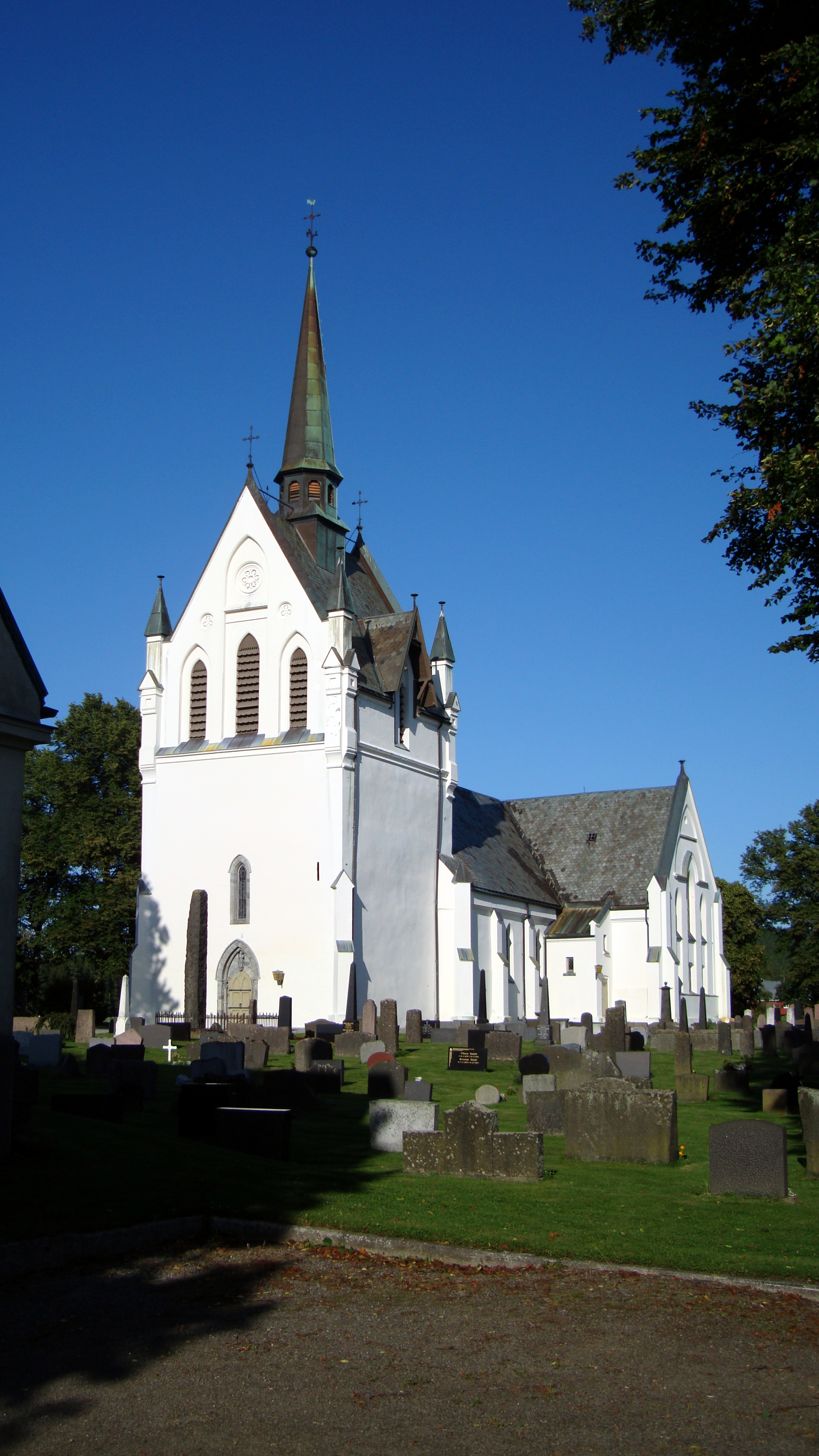

Religion
- Affiliation: Protestant
- Province: Østfold
- Ecclesiastical or organisational status: Deanery
- Year consecrated: 1250–60

Location
- Location: Eidsberg, Norway
- Interactive map of Eidsberg Church; Eidsberg kirke

Architecture
- Architect: Paul Due (1881)
- Style: Neo Gothic
- Groundbreaking: 13th century
- Materials: Stone

Website
- Official

Eidsberg Church (Norwegian: Eidsberg kirke or Østfold-domen) is a parish church located at Eidsberg in Østfold county, Norway. The Church is located down to the river Glomma by the side of the County Road 124. Eidsberg Church is associated with the Østre Borgesyssel deanery of the Diocese of Borg.

== Overview ==
Eidsberg church is consecrated to St. Olav who is depicted on a stone sculpture over the entrance to the church. It is the only one of the village's medieval churches to have been preserved. The church was constructed of stone and was probably built in the latter half of the 12th century in Romanesque style. The church was damaged in a fire around 1420. During the period 1880 - 1881, an extensive reconstruction of the church was carried out. Architect Paul Due provided the design resulting in the church having a Neo-Gothic cruciform style. There was an additional restoration during the 1920s and between 1959–1960.

== Tenor kirkeruin ==
The ruins of Tenor chapel (Tenor kirkeruin i Eidsberg) are located north of Eidsberg church. This medieval chapel was built of brick and macadam in the late 1200s as an annex to Eidsberg church. The chapel was closed in 1536 and stood deserted from about 1560. The chapel is mentioned in 1619 by Bishop Niels Simonsen Glostrup who says that the chapel is closed. As late as the early 1700s, most of the walls were still standing. The ruins were excavated between 1952 and 1956 by Bernt C. Lange and Håkon Christie. A new chapel was constructed during 1932.

== Church interior ==
Only the baptismal font dating from the 1200s retains the original medieval decor. It is of soapstone and shaped like a cup. The altarpiece was donated to the church in 1651, and was performed by craftsman Christopher Ridder (d.1695), who also designed the pulpit. The pulpit is made of oak with figures of Christ and the Evangelists in portal fields. The altarpiece is a baroque style rendering of the Crucifixion of Jesus.

== Gallery ==
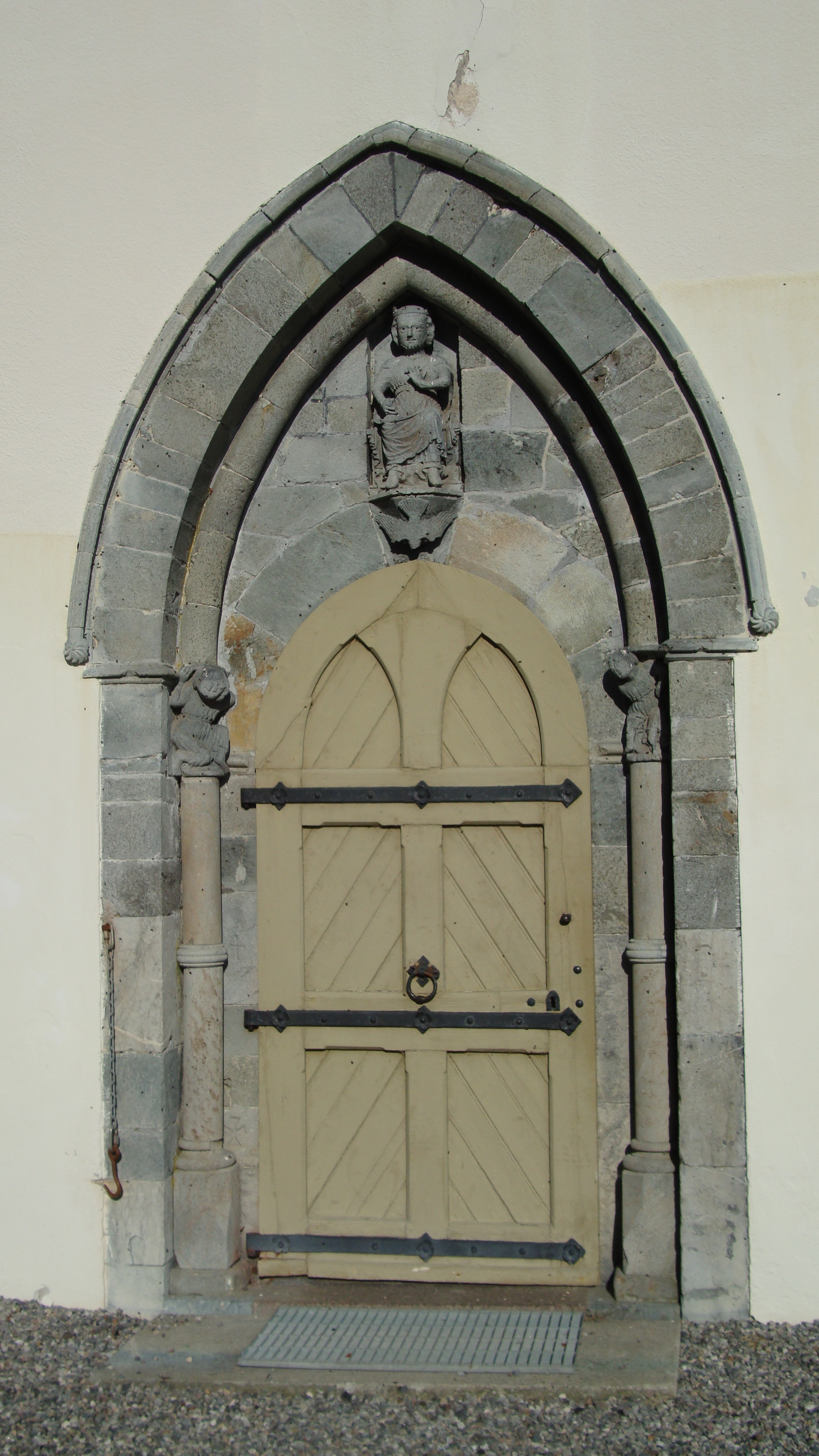
Church west portal

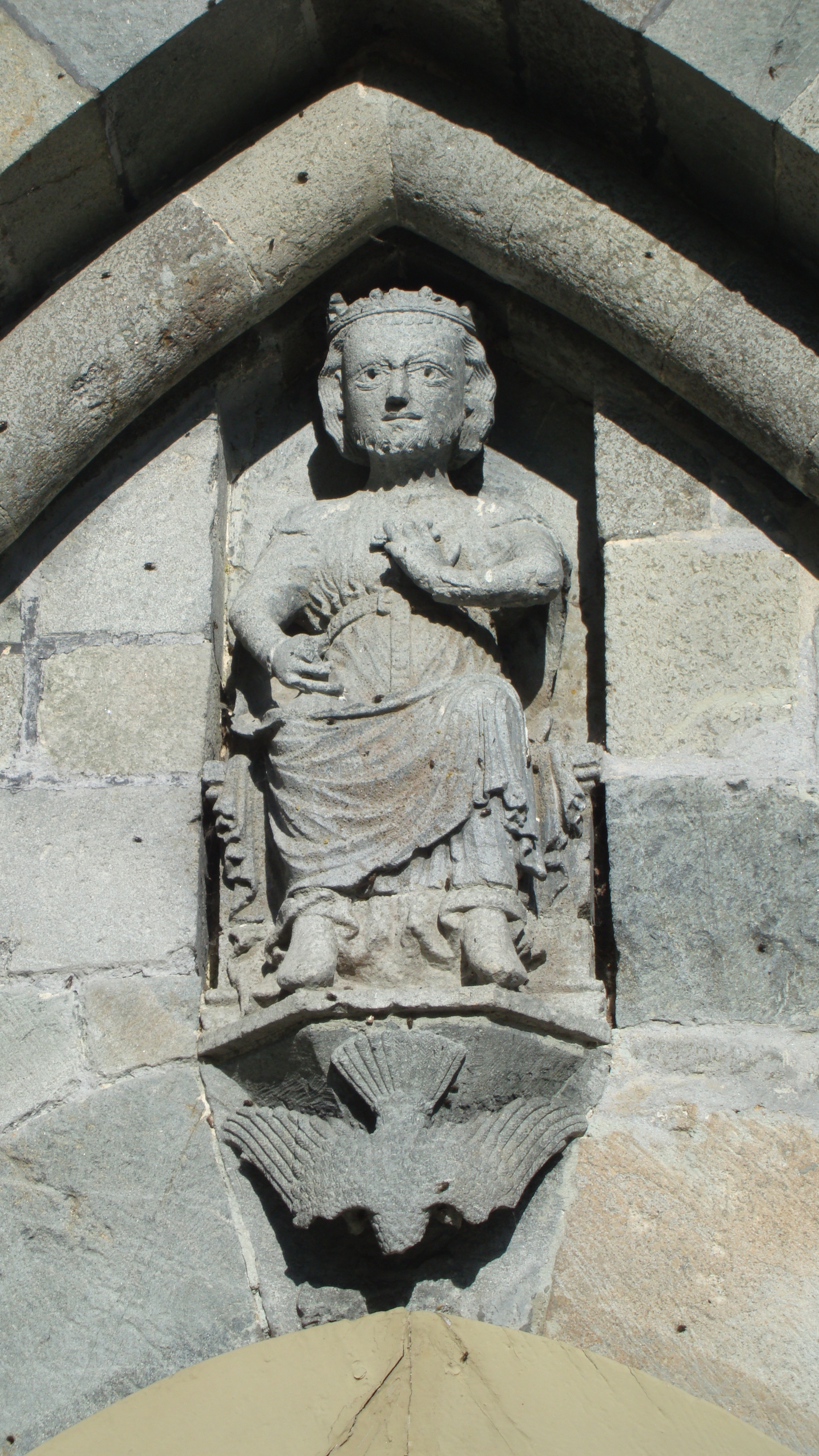
Statue of St. Olav

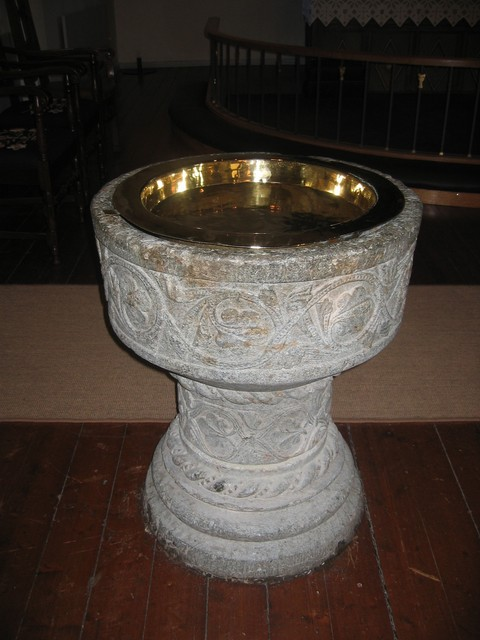
Church baptismal font

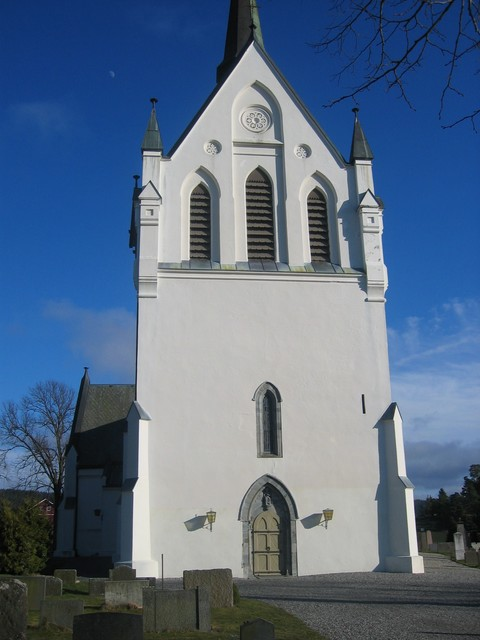
Church Tower

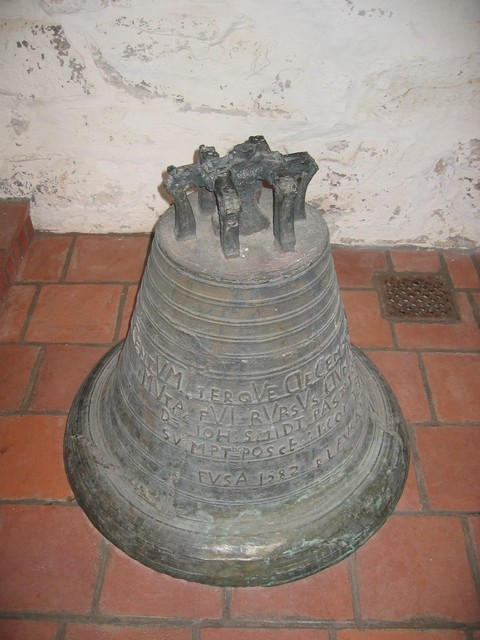
Old Church Bell

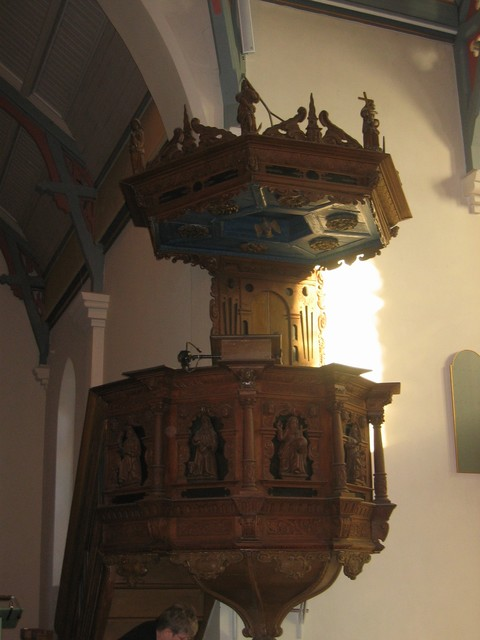
Church Pulpit

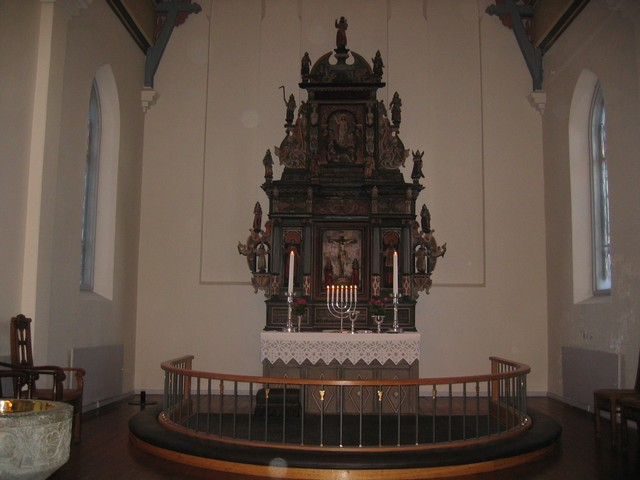
Church Altar

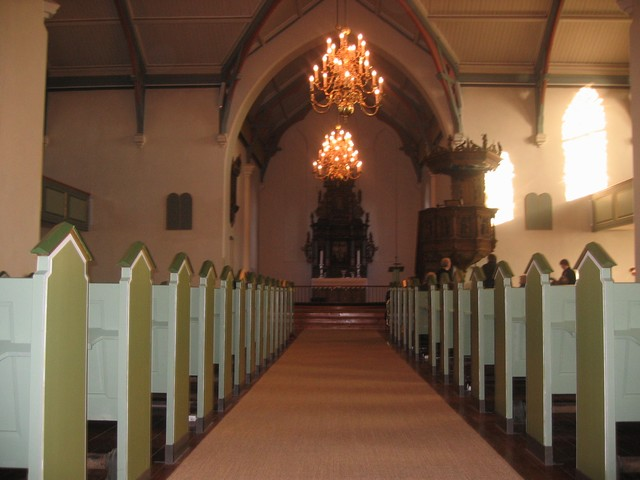
Eidsberg Church interior

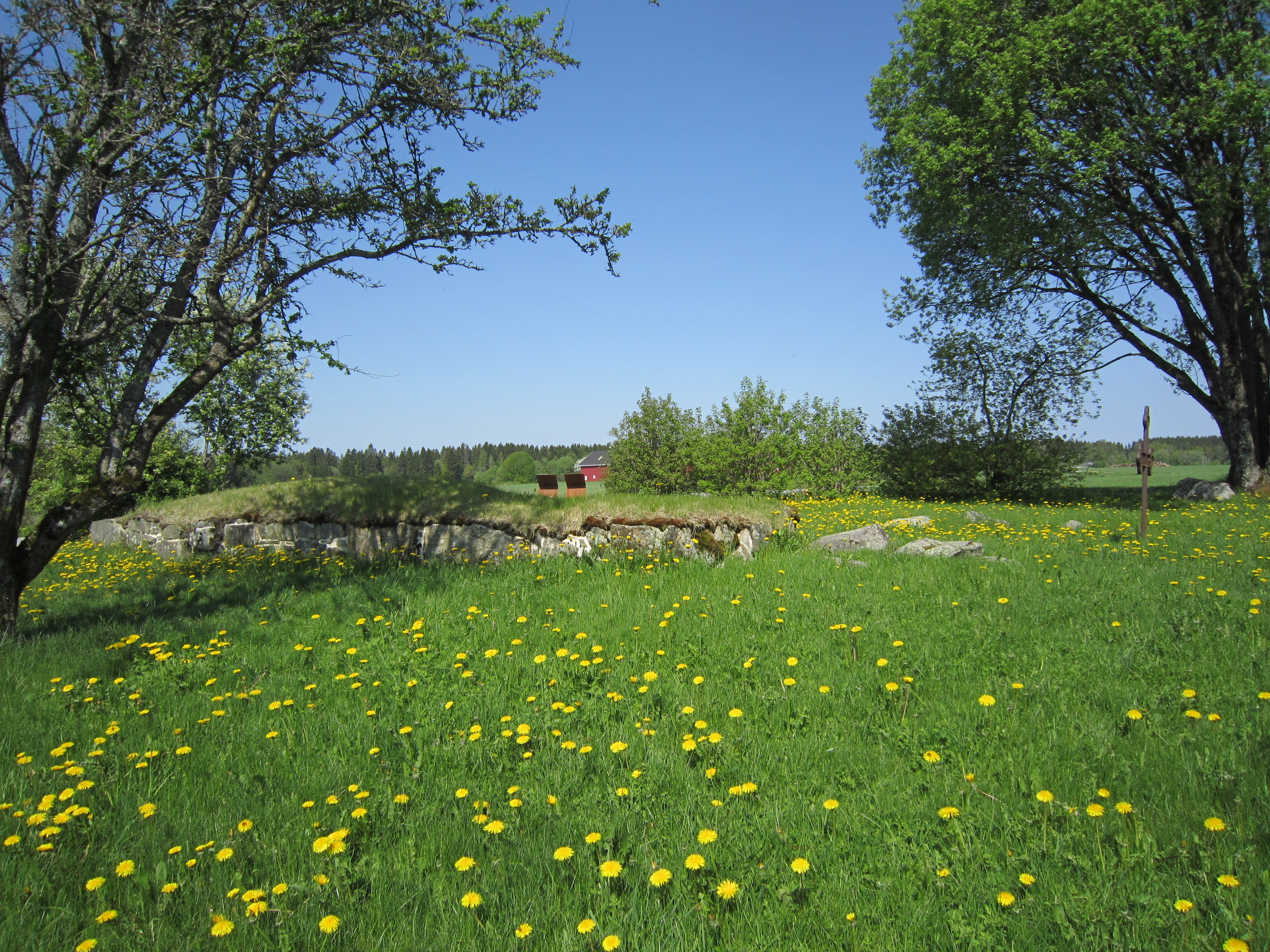
Site of chapel ruins

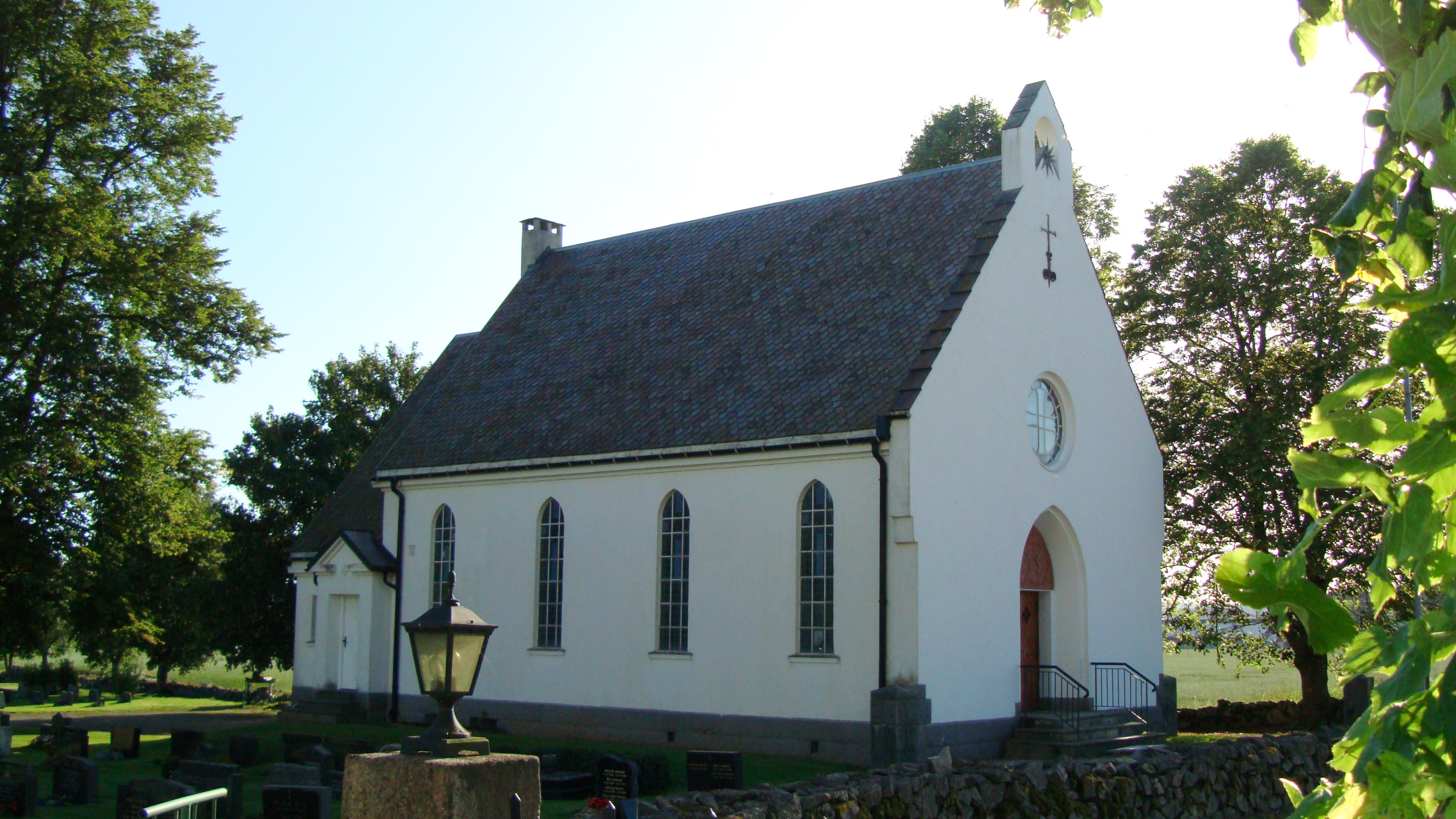
Chapel from 1932

== Birth place of ski jumping ==
Lekum gård (Lekum farm)
- Location: Lekum gård, Eidsberg, Norway

Size
- Hill record: 9.44 m (31.0 ft) (Norway) Olaf Rye (22 November 1808)

=== Lekum gård near Eidsberg Church ===
On 22 November 1808, Norwegian-Danish officer Olaf Rye, made the first recorded ski jump in history at the site of Lekum gård (Lekum farm), which is located about 300 metres NorthWest from Eidsberg Church.

Soldiers made a temporary artificial snow piled improvised ski jumping hill somewhere on the farm ground, exact location unknown, with first ever world record at 9.4 metres (31 ft). Hill melted or was demolished.

Distance was originally measured in ells (old Norwegian unit). At that time one ell equaled 62.94 centimetres. First recorded ski jump was originally measured at 15 ells (9.44 metres).

First ever ski jumping world record
No.	Date	Ski jumper	Country	Metres	Ells	Feet
#1	22 November 1808	Olaf Rye	Norway; Denmark	9.44	15	31

== Other sources ==
- Pettersen, Tore Steinar (2008) Kirker i Østfold, Borg bispedømme (Tindlund Forlag, Fredrikstad) ISBN 978-82-92923-09-2.
- Rasmussen, Alf Henry ( 1993) Våre kirker. Norsk kirkeleksikon (Vanebo forlag, Kirkenær) ISBN 82-75-27022-7.
