= Ski jumping techniques =

The sport of ski jumping has seen the use of numerous different techniques, or "styles", over the course of its more than two-hundred-year history. Depending on how the skis are positioned by an athlete, distances have increased by as much as 200 metres (660 ft) within the past century.

== Kongsberger ==
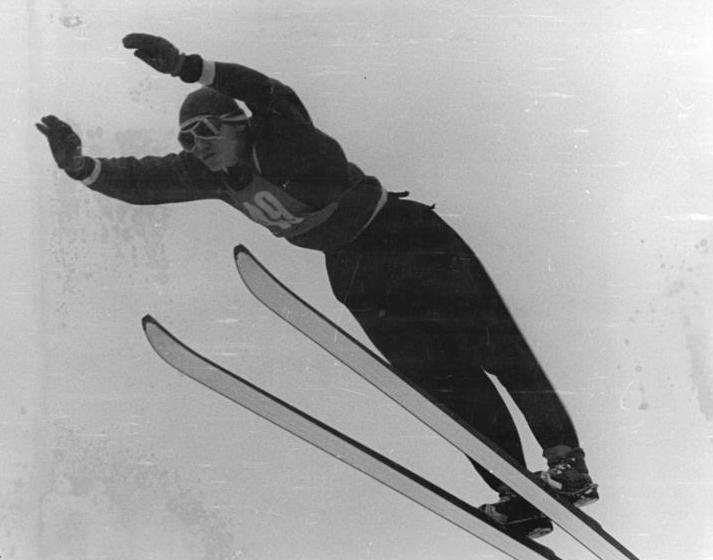
Harald Pfeffer using the Kongsberger technique, 1959

The Kongsberger technique (Norwegian: Kongsbergknekk) was created by Jacob Tullin Thams and Sigmund Ruud in Kongsberg, Norway. Developed after World War I, the technique was characterised by the athlete's upper body being bent at the hip, with arms extended at the front in the manner of a "superhero", and skis held parallel to each other. Sometimes the arms would be waved or 'flapped' around vigorously in a bird-like manner. This technique extended jumping lengths from 45 m (148 ft) to over 100 m (330 ft), and was used in ski jumping until being superseded by the Windisch and Däscher techniques in the 1950s.

== Windisch ==
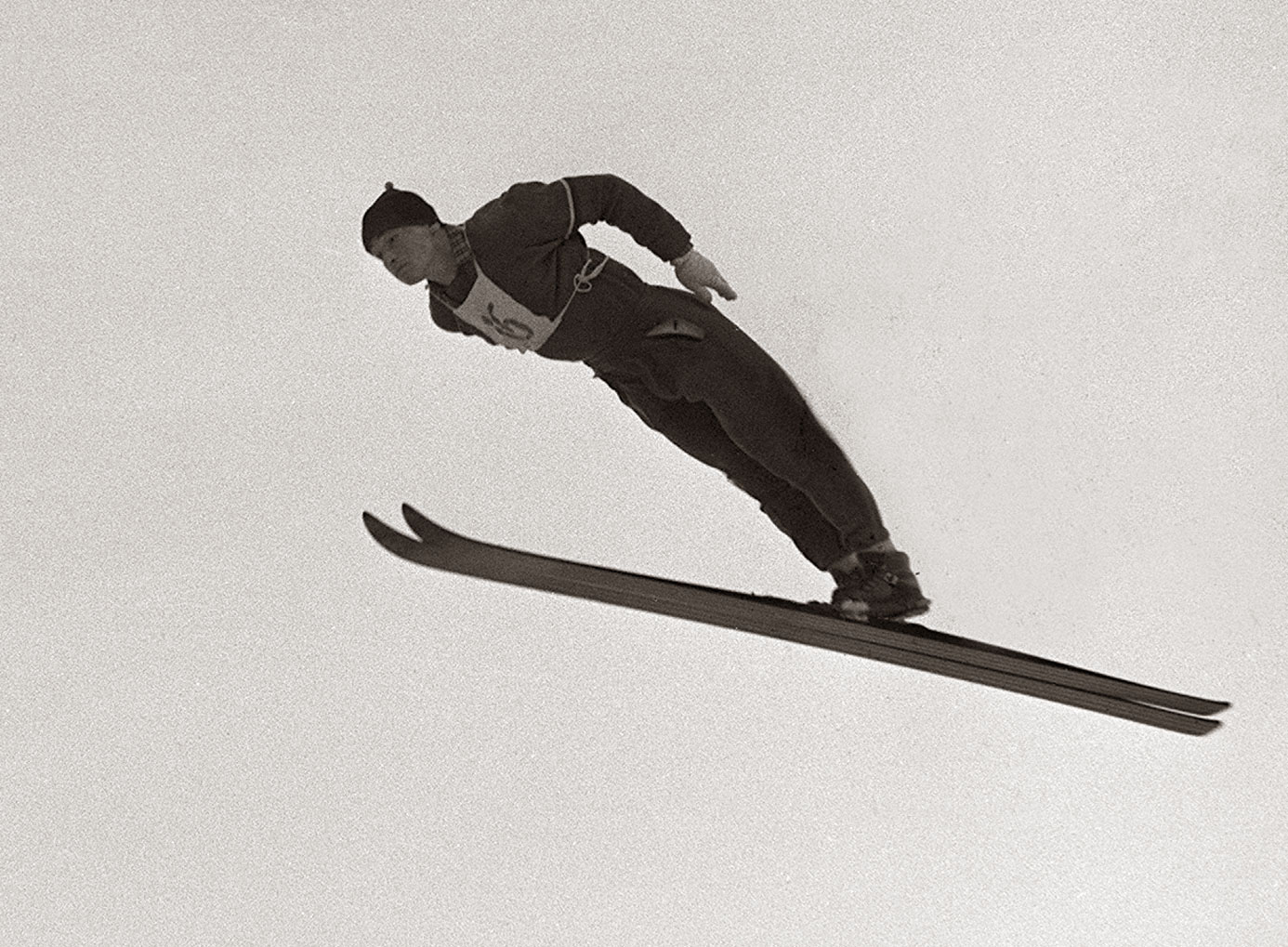
Miro Oman using the Windisch technique, 1958

The Windisch technique, created by Erich Windisch in 1949, was a modification of the Kongsberger technique. The athlete's arms are instead placed backwards toward the hips for a closer, more aerodynamic lean.

== Parallel/classic/Däscher ==
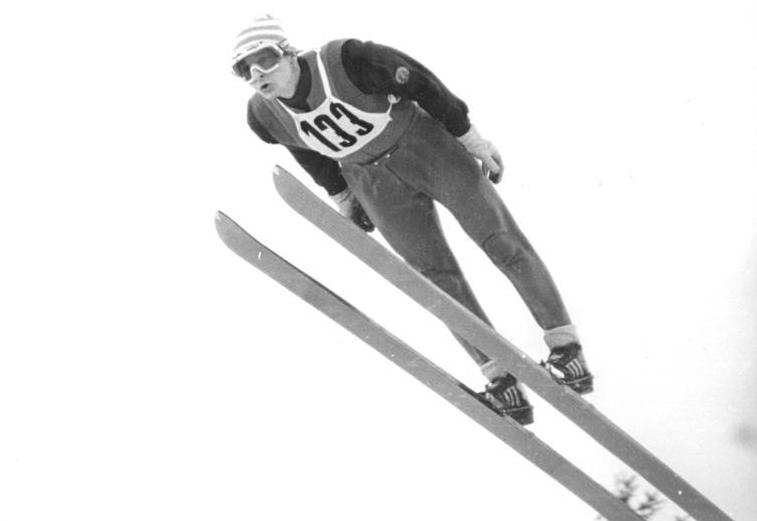
Hans-Georg Aschenbach using the parallel style, 1973

The parallel style, classic style, or Däscher technique was created by Andreas Däscher in the 1950s, as a modification of the Kongsberger and Windisch techniques. No longer was the upper body bent as much at the hip, enabling a flatter, more aerodynamic position in the air. This style became the standard for ski jumping as a whole until the development of the V-style. In the 1980s, Matti Nykänen created a variation of the parallel style in which the skis were pointed diagonally off to the side in order to increase surface area, essentially forming a crude "half 'V'".

== V-style ==
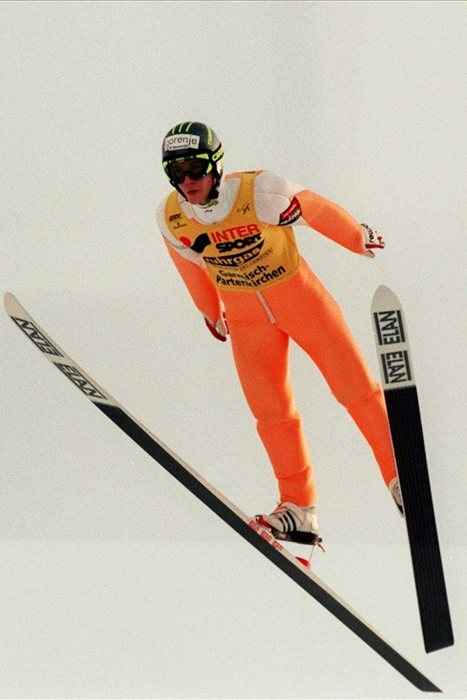
Primož Peterka using the V-style, 1997

The V-style, sometimes called the Graf–Boklöv technique, remains the sport's most recent significant technique change, with the ski tips spread outwards in a highly aerodynamic "V" shape. It became the predominant jumping technique following the Däscher/parallel style, which was last used in the early 1990s.

The originator of the V-style was Mirosław Graf, a Polish ski jumper from Szklarska Poręba. Graf discovered the technique as a child in 1969, but it was not taken seriously by his contemporaries. He was nonetheless aware that the V-style was highly effective, as his jumps became considerably longer.

In the early 1980s, Steve Collins used a modified variation of the V-style, or "delta style", with the ski tips held together in front instead of at the rear. Collins was the youngest winner of a World Cup event at the age of fifteen, but his technique never caught on. During this era, any technique aside from the parallel style was considered inappropriate by FIS judges. Although it enabled much longer jumps – up to ten percent more than the parallel style – judges made it an issue to award poor marks to those who used it.

The V-style only became recognised as valid by judges in the early 1990s, following wins and high rankings by Jan Boklöv, Jiří Malec and Stefan Zünd, who insisted on using the technique despite receiving low style points. By the mid-1990s it had become the predominant style of jumping used by all athletes, and was therefore no longer penalised as it had proven to be both safer and more efficient than the parallel style.

The efficiency of the V-style can be elevated with a low body weight, which carries several health risks.

== H-style ==
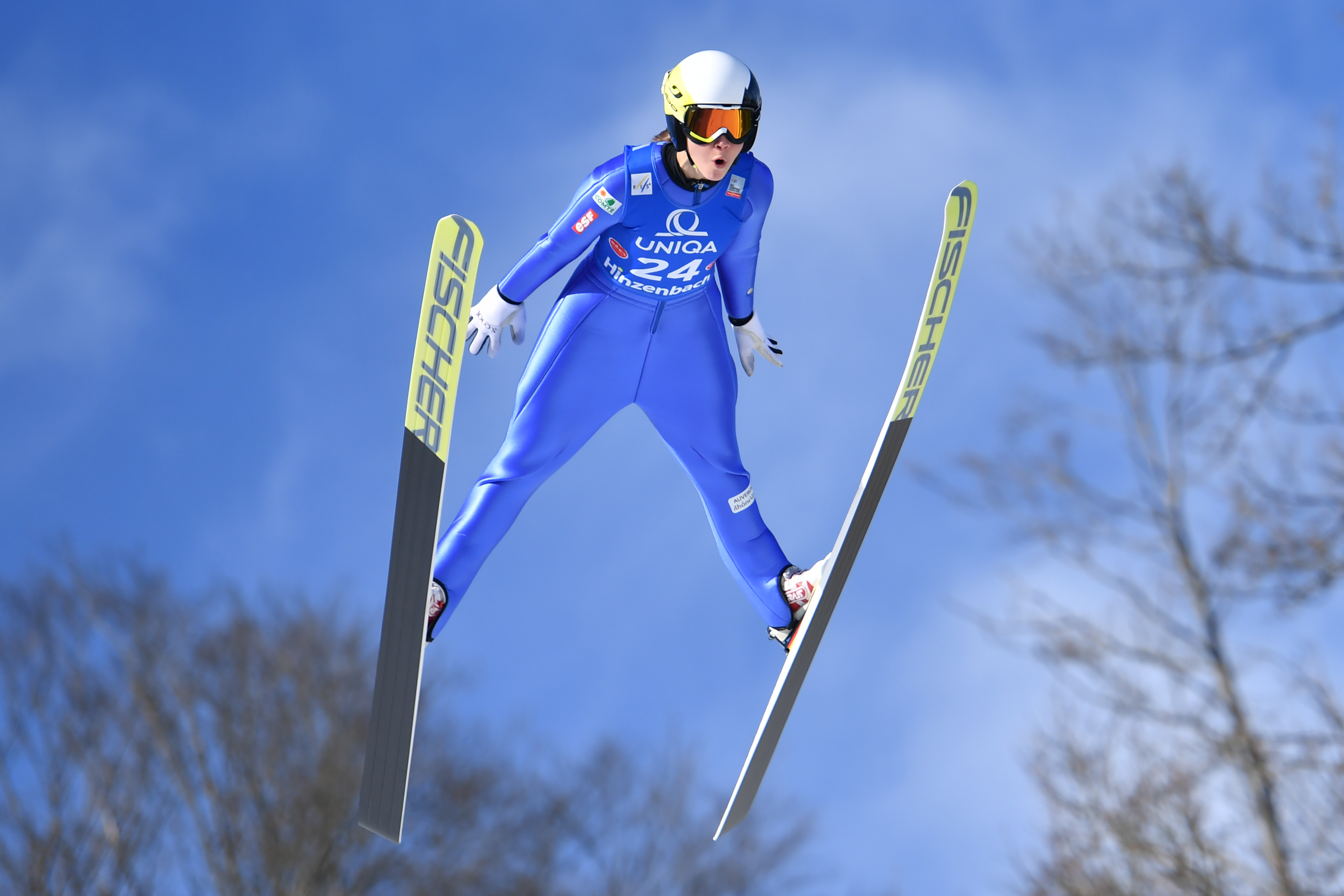
Léa Lemare using the H-style, 2017

In the H-style, the skis are spread very wide apart and held parallel in an "H" shape, with minimal or no V-angle. A lesser-used technique as of 2018, it is prominently used by Domen Prevc, Léa Lemare, and Nika Križnar.

== See also ==
- Ski flying#Technique changes: parallel to V-style
