= Olaf Rye =

Norwegian-Danish general (1791–1849)

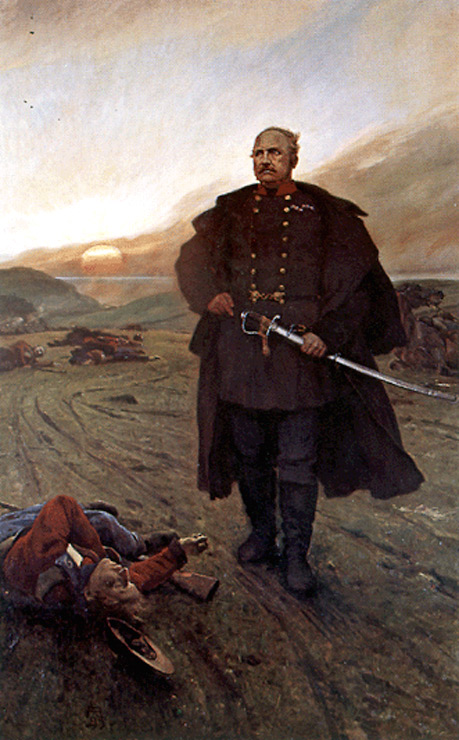
- portrayed by August Jerndorff (1895)

Personal information
- Nationality: Norway; Denmark
- Born: 16 November 1791 Bø, Telemark, Denmark-Norway
- Died: 6 July 1849 (aged 57) Fredericia, Denmark

Sport
- Sport: Skiing

Achievements and titles
- Personal bests: 9.5 m (31 ft); Eidsberg Church, Norway (22 November 1808)

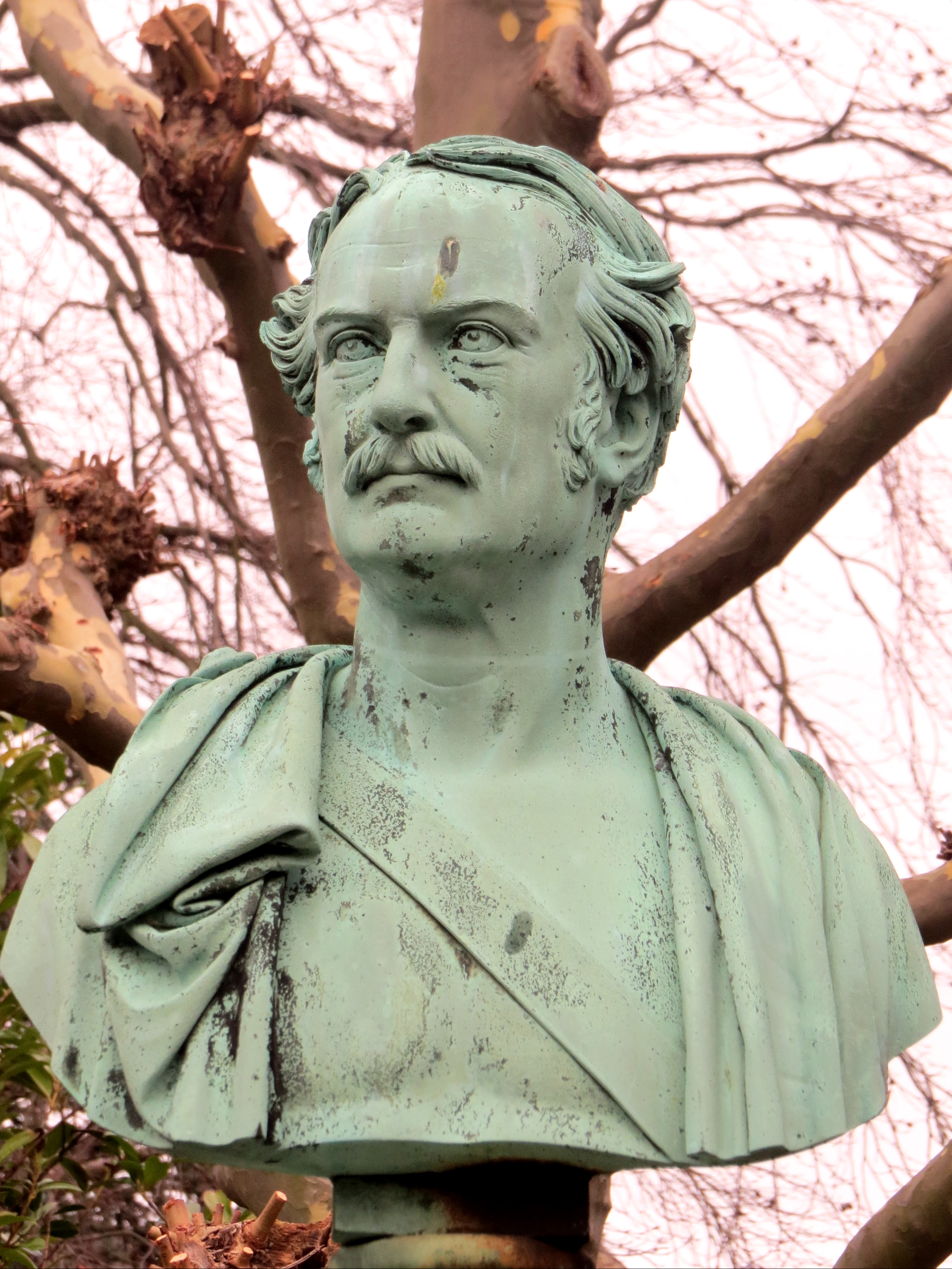
Bust by Herman Wilhelm Bissen at Garrison Cemetery, Copenhagen

Olaf Rye (16 November 1791 – 6 July 1849) was a Norwegian-Danish military officer. He died in battle during the First Schleswig War and is considered to have been a Danish war hero.

== Biography ==
Olaf Rye was born at Bø in Telemark, Norway. He was raised on the Nerbø farm. He was one of the sons of Matthias Andreas Rye (1756-1818) and Elisabeth Johanne Lind. His father was a captain and battalion manager of the Telemark Infantry Regiment (Telemarkens Infanteriregiment). His brother Johan Henrik Rye (1787–1868) was a jurist and civil servant.

In 1804, he started his military career as a cadet with the Norwegian Cadastre Corps in Kristiania (now Oslo). In 1813, he was appointed captain. He left Norway in 1815 and enlisted in the service of the Prussian General Gebhard Leberecht von Blücher. In 1817, Rye re-joined the Fynian Infantry Regiment of the Royal Danish Army. From 1819 to 1842, he was assigned to the Oldenborg Regiment. He was nominated for knighthood in the Order of the Dannebrog 1840 and was awarded the Dannebrogordenens Hæderstegn in 1848. In 1849, he served as a major-general and played a decisive role in the Battle of Fredericia which broke the Schleswig-Holstein siege of the town. He died during this battle. He was buried at Garrison Cemetery in Copenhagen.

In his spare time, skiing was his great passion. In November 1808, he reportedly launched himself 9.5 metres in the air in front of an audience of other soldiers at a location near the Eidsberg Church.

== Legacy ==
- Camp Olaf Rye – Danish KFOR camp in Kosovo.
- Ryes Kaserne – One of the two barracks in Fredericia.
- Olaf Ryes plass – Square in Oslo, Norway.
- Olaf Ryes vei – Street in Bergen, Norway.
- Ryes gate – Street in Kongsberg, Norway.
- Olaf Ryes Gade – Street in Odense, Denmark.
- Olaf Ryes Skanser - Sconce (fortification) at Helgenæs, Denmark.

== Ski jumping world record ==
The first ever world record from first ever mentioned ski jump in history.

Date	Hill	Location	Metres	Feet
22 November 1808	Eidsberg Church	Eidsberg, Norway	9.5	31

== Note ==
- This article is based on the corresponding articles on the Danish and Norwegian Wikipedias

== Related reading ==
- Nick Svendsen (2010) The First Schleswig-Holstein War 1848-50 Helion and Company) ISBN 9781906033446
