= Erich Windisch =

Erich Alfred Windisch (January 4, 1918, in Schöneck, Germany – February 14, 2007, in Vail, Colorado) was a German Olympic ski jumper who developed in 1949 the jumping technique in which the jumper’s arms are slightly arched and pointing downward. Windisch's technique modified the previously popular Kongsberger technique and it was the standard form in elite jumping competition until the current standard V-style technique was developed by Jan Boklöv in 1985.

During World War II, Windisch was a captain in the German army’s mountain troops, serving in Russia. After the war, he taught the Mountain Troops of the 3rd US Army. He later was the director of a ski school at Schneefernerhaus on Zugspitze near Garmisch.

In 1949, Windisch was pivotal in the evolution of ski jumping, changing the forward arm movement for balance, to a position of arms alongside the body. He had to do so because of a dislocated shoulder, which forced him to jump with his hands at his sides. He won the Bavarian championship in 1949 using the new style and the new position was adopted by other skiers who realized it improved aerodynamics. Scientific tests made in a wind tunnel in Switzerland proved the arms-down style was better than the then-current Kongsberger technique. The technique was the standard form used by elite jumpers until the introduction of the V-style in 1985 by Jan Boklöv of Sweden.

Windisch’s best jump was 337 feet, at Oberstdorf in 1950. He held the world record in water ski jumping, also in 1950.

Windisch was a member of the German Olympic team in both ski jumping and Nordic combined for the 1952 Games in Oslo, Norway, but he again dislocated his shoulder and was dropped out of the competition.

In 1957, he moved to Colorado and was a ski teacher there for more than 50 years—39 of them at Vail. In 1994, he was named Ski Instructor of the Year by Colorado Ski Country USA and inducted into the Colorado Ski Museum Hall of Fame. In 2005, Windisch was inducted into the Veteran’s Professional Ski Instructors Association.

Windisch also studied architecture and built three houses – one in Vail and two in Dillon, Colorado. Windisch did oil paintings and had an annual showing at the Vail Library. His paintings mostly were of mountains, in the United States and in Europe.
