= Bischofshofen =

- Municipality
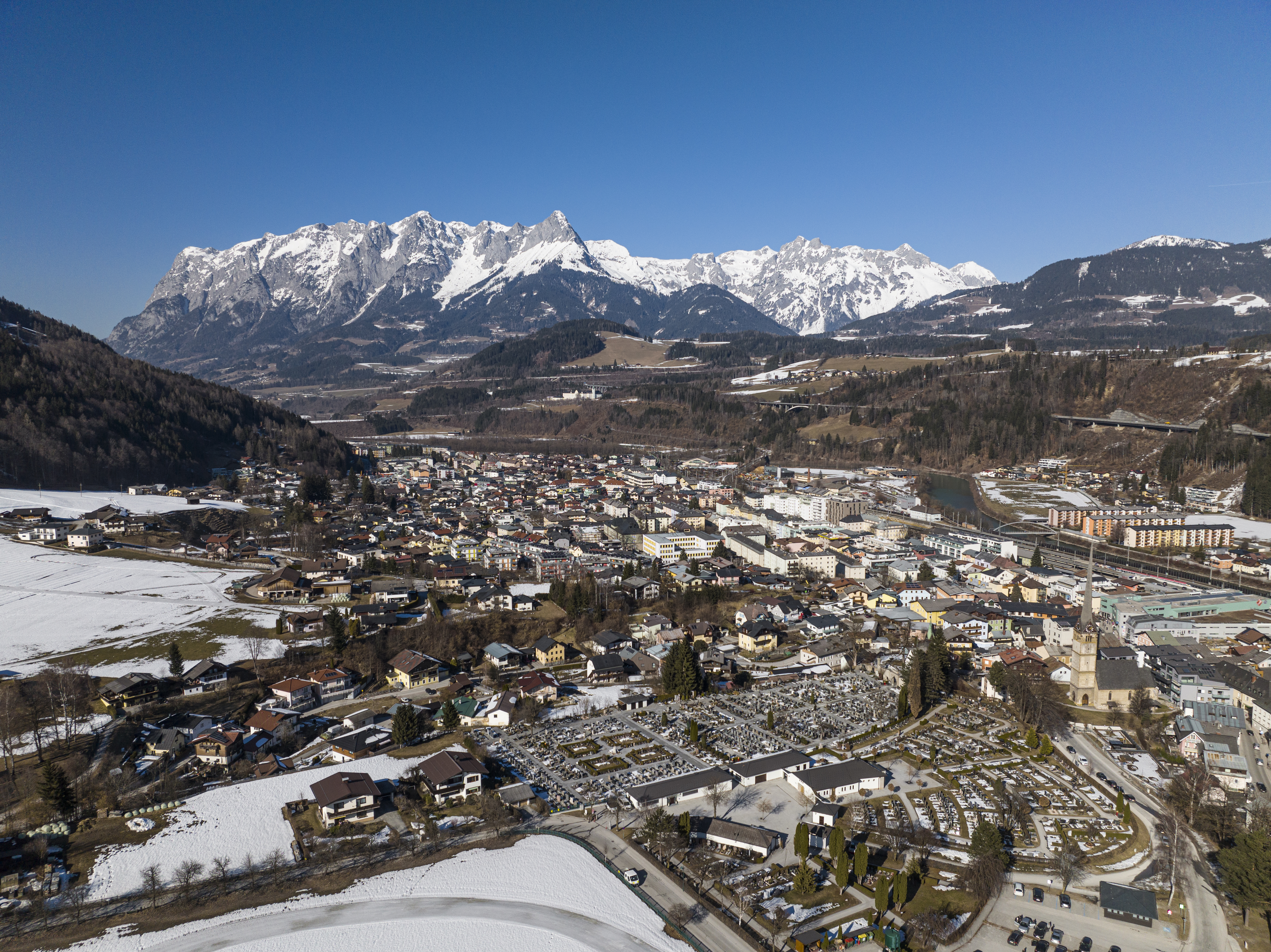
- View over Bischofshofen

- Flag Coat of arms

- Location within Austria
- Coordinates: 47°25′2″N 13°13′10″E
- Country: Austria
- State: Salzburg
- District: St. Johann im Pongau

Government
  - Mayor: Hansjörg Obinger (SPÖ)

Area
  - Total: 49.61 km^{2} (19.15 sq mi)
- Elevation: 544 m (1,785 ft)

Population (2018-01-01)
  - Total: 10,540
  - Density: 212.5/km^{2} (550.3/sq mi)
- Time zone: UTC+1 (CET)
  - Summer (DST): UTC+2 (CEST)
- Postal code: 5500
- Area code: 06462
- Vehicle registration: JO
- Website: bischofshofen.at

Bischofshofen (German pronunciation: [bɪʃɔfsˈhoːfn̩]) is a town in the district of St. Johann im Pongau in the Austrian state of Salzburg. It is an important traffic junction located both on the Salzburg-Tyrol Railway line and at the Tauern Autobahn, a major highway route crossing the main chain of the Alps.

== Geography ==
Bischofshofen is situated within the Northern Limestone Alps, in the valley of the Salzach river, about 50 km (31 mi) south of the state capital Salzburg. It is surrounded by the Hochkönig massif in the west, part of the Berchtesgaden Alps, the Tennen Mountains in the northeast, and the Salzburg Slate Alps in the southeast.

The municipal area comprises the cadastral communities of Bischofshofen proper, Buchberg, Haidberg, and Winkl.

=== Villages in Bischofshofen and population ===
- Alpfahrt - 149
- Bischofshofen - 7.134
- Buchberg - 440
- Gainfeld - 109
- Haidberg - 98
- Kreuzberg - 263
- Laideregg - 488
- Mitterberghütten - 1.323
- Winkl - 83
- Asten - 50

== History ==
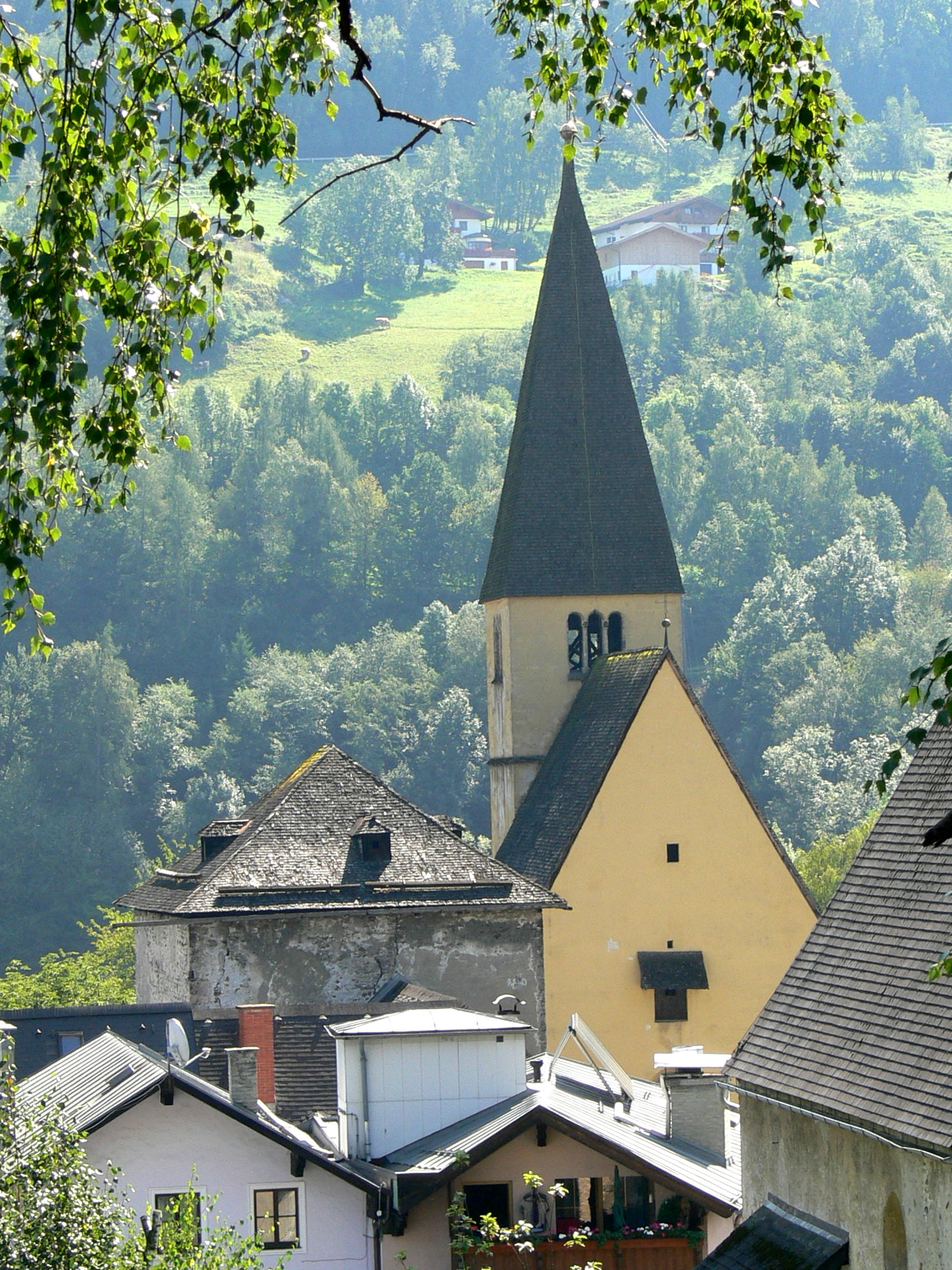
St Maximilian's Church

In Neolithic times local Celtic tribes mined copper and salt in the nearby hills. Later, the Celts were conquered by or assimilated into the expanding Roman Empire, when the area was incorporated into the Noricum province. In the 3rd/4th century, a Roman road led from the Salzach valley to Radstadt on the Enns river.

In the 8th century, Bavarian tribes settled the region, promoted by the Agilolfing dukes and Bishop Rupert of Salzburg. The Pongau (pongowe) area was first mentioned in a 711 deed, when a monastery (Cella Maximiliana) was founded through the graces of the Salzburg archbishops and a noble family from Oberalm. Slavic tribes later destroyed this monastery. The village of Hoven itself first appeared in 1151. In the 12th century, the Archbishop of Salzburg gifted the present-day St. Maxmillian's church with the gold- and gem-encrusted relic St. Rubert's crucifix.

Located south of the Salzburg Werfen valley, Bischofshofen was vested with market rights in the 14th century and rose to become an administrative center and residence for the Bishops of Chiemsee. It declined through the turbulent 16th century with its natural disasters, economic decline and religious warfare, culminating in the German Peasants' War of 1525–26. More than two thirds of the local population were expelled during the Counter-Reformation measures instigated by Prince-archbishop Count Leopold Anton von Firmian from 1731 onwards. Many of the Salzburg Protestants found a new home in East Prussia.

Finally Bischofshofen re-emerged as a railway hub with the building of the Salzburg-Tyrol Railway line in the late 19th century. It was elevated to the status of a market town in 1900 and received town privileges on 24 September 2000.

== Education ==
In Bischofshofen there are:

- Elementary Schools
  - VS Markt
  - VS Neue Heimat
  - VS Pöham
- High Schools:
  - Hermann-Wielandner-HS
  - Franz-Moßhammer-HS
- Professional Education
  - Polytechnische Schule
  - Privatgymnasium Sankt Rupert
  - TS Bischofshofen der Salzburger Tourismusschulen
  - die BAKIP, Bundesbildungsanstalt für Kindergartenpädagogik
  - Zweigstelle des Musikum

== Sports ==
The final competition of the traditional Four Hills Tournament in ski jumping is held annually at the Paul-Ausserleitner-Schanze in Bischofshofen around 6 January. The large hill ski jumping events at the FIS Nordic World Ski Championships 1999 took place in Bischofshofen.

== Mayor ==
Hansjörg Obinger (SPÖ) is the mayor of Bischofshofen since April 2014. His predecessor was Jakob Rohrmoser (ÖVP).

== Politics ==
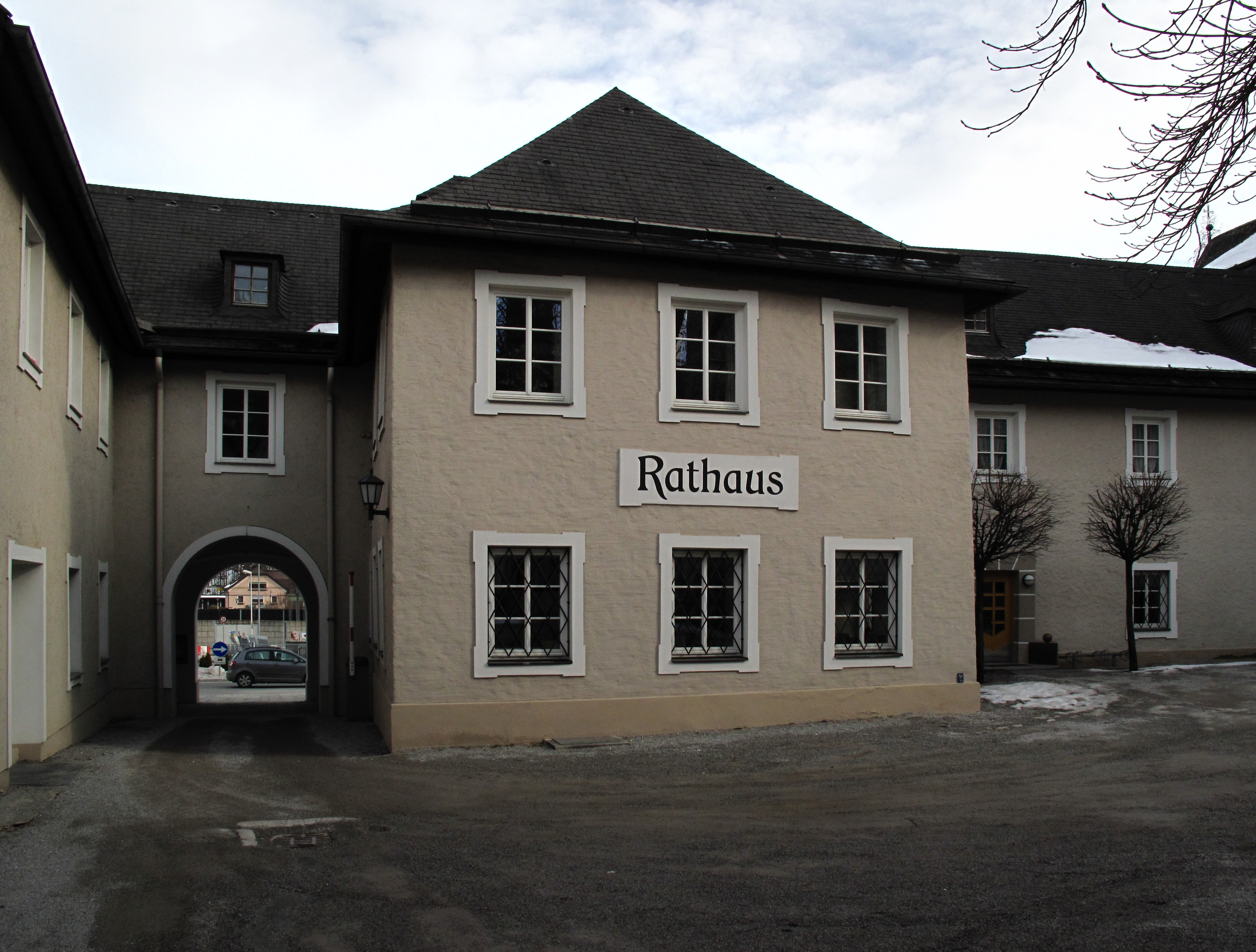
Town hall

=== City Council ===
As of 2014 local elections, the political parties represented in the Bischofshofen City Council are:

- SPÖ (15 seats)
- ÖVP (8 seats)
- FPÖ (2 seats)

== Twin towns – sister cities ==
Bischofshofen is twinned with:

- Unterhaching, Bavaria, Germany, since 1979
- Adeje, Santa Cruz de Tenerife, Canary Islands, Spain

== Notable people ==
- Heinz Oberhummer (1941–2015), physicist, researched nucleosynthesis.

=== Sport ===
- Hannes Schroll (1909–1985), Austrian Alpine ski racer and founded the Sugar Bowl Ski Resort in Norden, California.
- Paul Ausserleitner (1925–1952), ski jumper
- Lisi Pall (born 1951), alpine skier
- Patrick Reiter (born 1972), judoka.
