= 1978–79 Four Hills Tournament =

Ski jumping competition

Four Hills Tournament
- Venues: Schattenbergschanze, Bergiselschanze, Große Olympiaschanze, Paul-Ausserleitner-Schanze
- Location: West Germany, Austria
- Dates: 30 December 1978 – 6 January 1979
- Competitors: 84 from 17 nations

Medalists
gold medal	(Finland) Pentti Kokkonen
silver medal	(Switzerland) Hansjörg Sumi
bronze medal	(East Germany) Jochen Danneberg

The 27th annual Four Hills Tournament was won by Finnish athlete Pentti Kokkonen after two Third place finishes and two victories. No competitor had the necessary constancy over the course of the tournament. Yury Ivanov, the winner of Oberstdorf, only placed 56th (85.2 pts) in Garmisch-Partenkirchen. Josef Samek's Garmisch victory was followed by a 38th place (169.1 pts) in Innsbruck.

== Participating nations and athletes ==
Spain was represented at the Four Hills Tournament for the first time.

Nation	Number of Athletes	Athletes
West Germany	11	Hans-Jürgen Eschrich, Thomas Klauser, Dirk Kramer, Peter Leitner, Thomas Prosser, Christoph Schwarz, Hubert Schwarz, Peter Schwinghammer, Frank Sternkopf, Georg Waldvogel, Hermann Weinbuch
Austria	12	Fritz Esser, Edi Federer, Alfred Groyer, Heinz Koch, Armin Kogler, Alfred Lengauer, Alois Lipburger, Hans Millonig, Hubert Neuper, Willi Pürstl, Klaus Tuchscherer, Rudolf Wanner
Czechoslovakia	4	Ivo Felix, Josef Samek, Leoš Škoda, Ján Tánczos
East Germany	8	Matthias Buse, Jochen Danneberg, Manfred Deckert, Bernd Eckstein, Harald Duschek, Klaus Ostwald, Martin Weber, Falko Weißpflog
Finland	7	Tauno Käyhkö, Pentti Kokkonen, Keijo Korhonen, Jari Puikkonen, Tapio Räisänen, Jouko Törmänen, Kari Ylianttila
France	4	Patric Dubiez, Philippe Jacoberger, Bernard Moullier, Thierry Sauvanet
Hungary	4	László Fischer, Robert Fogarasi, Gábor Gellér, Zoltán Kelemen
Italy	2	Lido Tomasi, Ivano Wegher
Japan	3	Yūji Kawamura, Sakae Tsuruga, Hirokazu Yagi
Norway	4	Per Bergerud, Ulf Jørgensen, Roger Ruud, Johan Sætre
Poland	3	Stanisław Bobak, Piotr Fijas, Stanisław Pawlusiak
Soviet Union	7	Aleksey Borovitin, Vladimir Chernyaev, Yury Ivanov, Sergej Muchin, Valery Savin, Sergey Saychik, Vladimir Vlasov
Spain	1	Tomás Cano
Sweden	2	Christer Karlsson, Seppo Reijonen
Switzerland	5	Paul Egloff, Robert Mösching, Harald Reichenbach, Mario Rinaldi, Hansjörg Sumi
United States	2	Jim Denney, Kip Sundgaard
Yugoslavia	5	Zdravko Bogataj, Andrej Kaizer, Marko Mlakar, Bogdan Norčič, Miran Tepeš

== Results ==
=== Oberstdorf ===
(West Germany) Schattenbergschanze, Oberstdorf
30 December 1978

Rank	Name	Points
1	(Soviet Union) Yury Ivanov	235.4
2	(East Germany) Jochen Danneberg	234.5
3	(Finland) Pentti Kokkonen	232.4
4	(Austria) Klaus Tuchscherer	224.4
5	(Czechoslovakia) Ján Tánczos	222.8
6	(East Germany) Harald Duschek	222.6
7	(Austria) Willi Pürstl	221.6
8	(Switzerland) Hansjörg Sumi	220.2
9	(Czechoslovakia) Leoš Škoda	217.7
10	(Finland) Jari Puikkonen	216.3

=== Garmisch-Partenkirchen ===
(West Germany) Große Olympiaschanze, Garmisch-Partenkirchen
2 January 1979

Rank	Name	Points
1	(Czechoslovakia) Josef Samek	120.5
2	(Socialist Federal Republic of Yugoslavia) Bogdan Norčič	117.6
3	(Finland) Pentti Kokkonen	114.4
4	(East Germany) Harald Duschek	113.2
5	(East Germany) Matthias Buse	112.5
6	(Czechoslovakia) Ján Tánczos	111.5
7	(Switzerland) Hansjörg Sumi	111.2
8	(United States) Jim Denney	110.3
9	(East Germany) Jochen Danneberg	110.1
10	(Poland) Stanisław Bobak	109.4

=== Innsbruck ===
(Austria) Bergiselschanze, Innsbruck
4 January 1979

Rank	Name	Points
1	(Finland) Pentti Kokkonen	231.3
2	(Norway) Roger Ruud	224.6
3	(East Germany) Jochen Danneberg	218.8
4	(East Germany) Harald Duschek	216.0
5	(Switzerland) Hansjörg Sumi	215.4
6	(East Germany) Manfred Deckert	213.3
7	(Austria) Klaus Tuchscherer	213.2
8	(Norway) Johan Sætre	212.3
9	(East Germany) Martin Weber	212.2
10	(East Germany) Klaus Ostwald	211.3

=== Bischofshofen ===
(Austria) Paul-Ausserleitner-Schanze, Bischofshofen
6 January 1979

Rank	Name	Points
1	(Finland) Pentti Kokkonen	237.5
2	(Norway) Johan Sætre	236.9
3	(Poland) Piotr Fijas	236.0
4	(Switzerland) Hansjörg Sumi	235.8
5	(Finland) Jouko Törmänen	221.2
6	(East Germany) Martin Weber	219.1
7	(Czechoslovakia) Leoš Škoda	217.8
8	(East Germany) Jochen Danneberg	217.4
9	(Finland) Tapio Räisänen	213.7
10	(East Germany) Harald Duschek	213.6

== Final ranking ==
Rank	Name	Oberstdorf	Garmisch-Partenkirchen	Innsbruck	Bischofshofen	Points
1	(Finland) Pentti Kokkonen	3rd	3rd	1st	1st	815.6
2	(Switzerland) Hansjörg Sumi	8th	7th	5th	4th	782.6
3	(East Germany) Jochen Danneberg	2nd	9th	3rd	8th	780.8
4	(East Germany) Harald Duschek	6th	4th	4th	10th	765.4
5	(Norway) Johan Sætre	11th	20th	8th	2nd	765.3
6	(Czechoslovakia) Leoš Škoda	9th	11th	13th	7th	748.3
7	(Austria) Klaus Tuchscherer	4th	23rd	7th	15th	748.1
8	(East Germany) Matthias Buse	16th	5th	11th	15th	741.9
9	(East Germany) Martin Weber	27th	13th	9th	6th	739.5
10	(Poland) Piotr Fijas	38th	17th	12th	3rd	737.2
