= 1976–77 Four Hills Tournament =

Ski jumping competition

Four Hills Tournament
- Venues: Schattenbergschanze, Bergiselschanze, Große Olympiaschanze, Paul-Ausserleitner-Schanze
- Location: West Germany, Austria
- Dates: 30 December 1976 – 6 January 1977
- Competitors: 74 from 14 nations

Medalists
gold medal	(East Germany) Jochen Danneberg
silver medal	(Switzerland) Walter Steiner
bronze medal	(East Germany) Henry Glaß

At the 25th annual Four Hills Tournament, Jochen Danneberg became the third ski jumper after Helmut Recknagel and Bjørn Wirkola to defend his title. Crucial was a clear victory at the New Year's event in Garmisch-Partenkirchen. For the first time in ten years, there were four different winners at the single events.

== Participating nations and athletes ==
Nation	Number of Athletes	Athletes
West Germany	8	Alfred Grosche, Dirk Kramer, Peter Leitner, Frank Rombach, Manfred Runge, Sepp Schwinghammer, Rudi Tusch
Austria	13	Reinhold Bachler, Edi Federer, Rupert Gürtler, Walter Habersatter jr., Toni Innauer, Alois Lipburger, Hans Millonig, Alfred Pungg, Willi Pürstl, Karl Schnabl, Klaus Tuchscherer, Hans Wallner, Rudolf Wanner
Czechoslovakia	6	Jaroslav Balcar, Zdeněk Janouch, František Novák, Josef Samek, Leoš Škoda, Ján Tánczos
East Germany	8	Matthias Buse, Jochen Danneberg, Harald Duschek, Henry Glaß, Thomas Meisinger, Jürgen Thomas, Martin Weber, Falko Weißpflog
Finland	4	P. Hyvävinen, Pentti Kokkonen, Tapio Räisänen, Jouko Törmänen
Italy	3	Leo De Crignis, Lido Tomasi, Ivano Wegher
Japan	3	Takao Itō, Yūji Kawamura, Manabu Ono
Norway	4	Per Bergerud, Bjarne Næs, Roger Ruud, Johan Sætre
Poland	3	Stanisław Bobak, Henryk Tajner, Janusz Waluś
Soviet Union	5	Aleksey Borovitin, Yury Ivanov, Aleksandr Karapuzov, Leonid Komarov, Sergey Saychik
Sweden	3	Odd Brandsegg, Lennart Elimä, Seppo Reijonen
Switzerland	6	Robert Mösching, Hans Schmid, Walter Steiner, Hansjörg Sumi, Jean Luc Ungricht, Ernst von Grünigen
United States	4	Jim Denney, Jim Maki, Chris McNeill, Ron Steele
Yugoslavia	4	Jože Demšar, Branko Dolhar, Janez Loštrek, Bogdan Norčič

== Results ==
=== Oberstdorf ===
(West Germany) Schattenbergschanze, Oberstdorf
30 December 1976

Rank	Name	Points
1	(Austria) Toni Innauer	255.6
2	(East Germany) Jochen Danneberg	253.7
3	(Switzerland) Walter Steiner	252.3
4	(East Germany) Harald Duschek	248.2
5	(East Germany) Henry Glaß	239.4
6	(Austria) Alois Lipburger	236.6
7	(Finland) Jouko Törmänen	235.3
8	(Czechoslovakia) František Novák	232.5
9	(Austria) Reinhold Bachler	230.9
10	(Norway) Johan Sætre	229.8

=== Garmisch-Partenkirchen ===
(West Germany) Große Olympiaschanze, Garmisch-Partenkirchen
1 January 1977

Rank	Name	Points
1	(East Germany) Jochen Danneberg	235.2
2	(Austria) Toni Innauer	222.3
3	(East Germany) Harald Duschek	220.1
4	(East Germany) Henry Glaß	219.3
5	(Norway) Johan Sætre	213.5
6	(Switzerland) Walter Steiner	212.7
7	(Austria) Alois Lipburger	211.9
8	(Austria) Alfred Pungg	209.4
9	(East Germany) Jürgen Thomas	208.6
10	(East Germany) Martin Weber	208.3

=== Innsbruck ===
(Austria) Bergiselschanze, Innsbruck
4 January 1977

Rank	Name	Points
1	(East Germany) Henry Glaß	233.6
2	(Switzerland) Walter Steiner	226.3
3	(Austria) Toni Innauer	217.3
4	(Austria) Karl Schnabl	216.4
5	(Austria) Reinhold Bachler	216.1
6	(East Germany) Jochen Danneberg	213.9
7	(Soviet Union) Yury Ivanov	213.5
8	(Austria) Alfred Pungg	210.4
9	(Czechoslovakia) Ján Tánczos	207.9
10	(East Germany) Thomas Meisinger	203.5

=== Bischofshofen ===
(Austria) Paul-Ausserleitner-Schanze, Bischofshofen
6 January 1977

After three events, the leading four were close together. Toni Innauer, leader Danneberg's closest rival, only placed 19th and fell back in the overall ranking. In spite of his win, Walter Steiner did not close the gap to Danneberg.

Rank	Name	Points
1	(Switzerland) Walter Steiner	220.4
2	(Austria) Karl Schnabl	217.0
3	(East Germany) Jochen Danneberg	215.7
4	(East Germany) Thomas Meisinger	211.6
5	(Austria) Klaus Tuchscherer	207.5
6	(East Germany) Harald Duschek	204.4
7	(Norway) Per Bergerud	200.2
8	(East Germany) Henry Glaß	200.1
9	(East Germany) Martin Weber	198.1
10	(Austria) Hans Millonig	196.1

== Final ranking ==
Rank	Name	Oberstdorf	Garmisch-Partenkirchen	Innsbruck	Bischofshofen	Points
1	(East Germany) Jochen Danneberg	2nd	1st	6th	3rd	918.5
2	(Switzerland) Walter Steiner	3rd	6th	2nd	1st	911.7
3	(East Germany) Henry Glaß	5th	4th	1st	8th	892.4
4	(Austria) Toni Innauer	1st	2nd	3rd	19th	876.0
5	(East Germany) Harald Duschek	4th	3rd	11th	6th	875.8
6	(East Germany) Thomas Meisinger	12th	11th	10th	4th	845.7
7	(Austria) Karl Schnabl	29th	21st	4th	2nd	844.7
8	(Austria) Reinhold Bachler	9th	14th	5th	25th	828.8
9	(Austria) Alfred Pungg	16th	8th	8th	14th	827.1
10	(East Germany) Martin Weber	21st	10th	17th	9th	818.7
