= Ski jumping at the 1980 Winter Olympics – Normal hill individual =

Men's normal hill individual at the XIII Olympic Winter Games
- Pictogram for ski jumping
- Venue: Lake Placid Olympic Ski Jumping Complex
- Dates: February 17, 1980
- Competitors: 53 from 18 nations
- winning score: 266.3

Medalists
1st place, gold medalist(s)		Toni Innauer	Austria
2nd place, silver medalist(s)		Hirokazu Yagi	Japan
2nd place, silver medalist(s)		Manfred Deckert	East Germany

The men's normal hill individual ski jumping competition for the 1980 Winter Olympics was held at Lake Placid Olympic Ski Jumping Complex. It occurred on 17 February.

== Results ==
Rank	Athlete	Country	Jump 1	Jump 2	Total
1st place, gold medalist(s)	Toni Innauer	Austria	131.6	134.7	266.3
2nd place, silver medalist(s)	Hirokazu Yagi	Japan	128.9	120.3	249.2
2nd place, silver medalist(s)	Manfred Deckert	East Germany	121.7	127.5	249.2
4	Masahiro Akimoto	Japan	120.8	127.7	248.5
5	Pentti Kokkonen	Finland	126.8	120.8	247.6
6	Hubert Neuper	Austria	116.7	128.8	245.5
7	Alfred Groyer	Austria	124.5	120.8	245.3
8	Jouko Törmänen	Finland	119.0	124.5	243.5
9	Hansjörg Sumi	Switzerland	117.5	125.1	242.6
10	Stanisław Bobak	Poland	124.8	117.4	242.2
11	Martin Weber	East Germany	118.5	118.3	236.8
12	Armin Kogler	Austria	123.2	111.6	234.8
13	Roger Ruud	Norway	113.3	120.9	234.2
14	Johan Sætre	Norway	118.0	113.8	231.8
15	Henry Glaß	East Germany	114.8	116.6	231.4
16	Jari Puikkonen	Finland	115.8	111.7	227.5
17	Jeff Davis	United States	105.7	120.6	226.3
18	Per Bergerud	Norway	110.7	113.3	224.0
19	Peter Leitner	West Germany	114.3	108.7	223.0
20	Jochen Danneberg	East Germany	118.8	103.9	222.7
21	Aleksey Borovitin	Soviet Union	115.0	105.3	220.3
22	Leoš Škoda	Czechoslovakia	100.7	119.0	219.7
23	Chris McNeill	United States	110.1	102.4	212.5
24	Bernard Moullier	France	108.1	102.4	210.5
25	Hubert Schwarz	West Germany	113.2	95.9	209.1
26	Jim Maki	United States	113.8	94.9	208.7
27	Ivar Mobekk	Norway	97.6	111.0	208.6
28	Steve Collins	Canada	111.8	95.9	207.7
29	Takafumi Kawabata	Japan	111.1	96.1	207.2
30	Tauno Käyhkö	Canada	108.8	96.6	205.4
31	Vladimir Vlasov	Soviet Union	109.2	95.6	204.8
32	Kari Ylianttila	Finland	105.8	97.4	203.2
33	Yury Ivanov	Soviet Union	93.8	106.5	200.3
34	Jan Holmlund	Sweden	101.7	93.8	195.5
35	Gérard Colin	France	87.9	105.9	193.8
36	Jim Denney	United States	93.2	99.7	192.9
37	Robert Mösching	Switzerland	97.6	95.0	192.6
38	Lido Tomasi	Italy	93.4	99.1	192.5
39	Josef Samek	Czechoslovakia	84.7	105.6	190.3
40	Stanisław Pawlusiak	Poland	94.9	88.2	183.1
41	Horst Bulau	Canada	79.4	100.7	180.1
42	Hiroyasu Aizawa	Japan	88.4	88.5	176.9
43	Paul Egloff	Switzerland	80.2	91.5	171.7
44	Miran Tepeš	Yugoslavia	78.3	93.3	171.6
45	Brane Benedik	Yugoslavia	71.4	78.2	149.6
46	Andrey Shakirov	Soviet Union	72.8	74.3	147.1
47	Piotr Fijas	Poland	109.4	34.6	144.0
48	Bogdan Norčič	Yugoslavia	50.7	73.9	124.6
