= Ski jumping at the 1980 Winter Olympics – Large hill individual =

Men's large hill individual at the XIII Olympic Winter Games
- Pictogram for ski jumping
- Venue: Lake Placid Olympic Ski Jumping Complex
- Dates: February 23, 1980
- Competitors: 53 from 18 nations
- winning score: 271.0

Medalists
1st place, gold medalist(s)		Jouko Törmänen; Finland
2nd place, silver medalist(s)		Hubert Neuper; Austria
3rd place, bronze medalist(s)		Jari Puikkonen; Finland

The men's large hill individual ski jumping competition for the 1980 Winter Olympics was held in Lake Placid Olympic Ski Jumping Complex. It occurred on 23 February.

== Results ==
Rank	Bib	Athlete	Country	Jump 1	Jump 2	Total
1st place, gold medalist(s)	24	Jouko Törmänen	Finland	133.5	137.5	271.0
2nd place, silver medalist(s)	10	Hubert Neuper	Austria	129.9	132.5	262.4
3rd place, bronze medalist(s)	15	Jari Puikkonen	Finland	126.4	122.1	248.5
4	33	Toni Innauer	Austria	126.2	119.5	245.7
5	49	Armin Kogler	Austria	123.7	121.9	245.6
6	13	Roger Ruud	Norway	122.7	120.3	243.0
7	39	Hansjörg Sumi	Switzerland	135.0	107.7	242.7
8	32	Jim Denney	United States	123.8	115.3	239.1
9	48	Steve Collins	Canada	126.7	111.7	238.4
10	44	Masahiro Akimoto	Japan	113.8	120.9	234.7
11	19	Henry Glaß	East Germany	105.6	126.4	232.0
12	37	Pentti Kokkonen	Finland	115.2	115.7	230.9
13	7	Kari Ylianttila	Finland	111.0	118.1	229.1
14	46	Piotr Fijas	Poland	118.0	108.1	226.1
15	41	Klaus Ostwald	East Germany	119.0	106.1	225.1
16	25	Per Bergerud	Norway	120.9	103.9	224.8
17	34	Robert Mösching	Switzerland	118.4	104.1	222.5
18	21	Peter Leitner	West Germany	116.6	104.9	221.5
19	22	Hirokazu Yagi	Japan	103.3	116.9	220.2
20	29	Manfred Deckert	East Germany	111.0	108.2	219.2
21	45	Leoš Škoda	Czechoslovakia	116.6	100.6	217.2
22	27	Stanisław Bobak	Poland	112.3	102.0	214.3
23	23	Josef Samek	Czechoslovakia	103.0	110.5	213.5
24	5	Ivar Mobekk	Norway	102.8	109.7	212.5
25	3	Hans Millonig	Austria	101.5	107.4	208.9
26	28	Tauno Käyhkö	Canada	104.4	104.2	208.6
27	4	Walter Malmquisţ II	United States	104.0	101.4	205.4
28	35	Vladimir Vlasov	Soviet Union	103.5	101.8	205.3
29	12	Horst Bulau	Canada	106.9	98.2	205.1
30	2	Karl Lustenberger	Switzerland	104.4	98.7	203.1
31	43	Johan Sætre	Norway	102.0	100.2	202.2
32	11	Takafumi Kawabata	Japan	111.2	90.2	201.4
33	6	Harald Duschek	East Germany	98.9	99.7	198.6
34	20	Yury Ivanov	Soviet Union	103.5	93.5	197.0
35	1	Hiroyasu Aizawa	Japan	99.2	96.1	195.3
36	31	Aleksey Borovitin	Soviet Union	91.8	101.6	193.4
37	42	Bernard Moullier	France	92.5	95.8	188.3
38	50	Bogdan Norčič	Yugoslavia	84.5	102.9	187.4
39	8	Andrey Shakirov	Soviet Union	99.3	87.7	187.0
40	26	Miran Tepeš	Yugoslavia	96.1	88.3	184.4
41	38	Hubert Schwarz	West Germany	115.5	66.4	181.9
42	30	Gérard Colin	France	86.8	93.8	180.6
43	17	Stanisław Pawlusiak	Poland	92.5	86.6	179.1
44	40	Jeff Davis	United States	99.6	76.9	176.5
45	16	Reed Zuehlke	United States	100.4	68.8	169.2
46	47	Lido Tomasi	Italy	83.2	85.9	169.1
47	14	Paul Egloff	Switzerland	87.8	79.4	167.2
48	18	Hermann Weinbuch	West Germany	83.2	72.2	155.4
49	9	Brane Benedik	Yugoslavia	60.5	77.8	138.3
50	36	Jan Holmlund	Sweden	26.2	—	26.2
