= 1977–78 Four Hills Tournament =

Ski jumping competition

Four Hills Tournament
- Venues: Schattenbergschanze, Bergiselschanze, Große Olympiaschanze, Paul-Ausserleitner-Schanze
- Location: West Germany, Austria
- Dates: 30 December 1977 – 6 January 1978
- Competitors: 83 from 15 nations

Medalists
gold medal	(Finland) Kari Ylianttila
silver medal	(East Germany) Matthias Buse
bronze medal	(East Germany) Martin Weber

The 26th annual Four Hills Tournament was won by Finnish ski jumper Kari Ylianttila. In the final ranking, he led directly ahead of five East German athletes. Another one, defending champion Jochen Danneberg, was the overall leader after his victory in Garmisch-Partenkirchen, but didn't compete at the events in Austria.

== Participating nations and athletes ==
Nation	Number of Athletes	Athletes
West Germany	7	Hans-Jürgen Eschrich, Wolfgang Hahn, Peter Leitner, Frank Rombach, Christoph Schwarz, Hubert Schwarz, Peter Schwinghammer
Austria	15	Gebhard Aberer, Reinhold Bachler, Edi Federer, Alfred Groyer, Rupert Gürtler, Armin Kogler, Alois Lipburger, Hans Millonig, Hubert Neuper, Alfred Pungg, Willi Pürstl, Karl Schnabl, Klaus Tuchscherer, Hans Wallner, Rudolf Wanner
Bulgaria	3	Vladimir Breitchev, Petar Dimitrov, Bojan Stoikov
Czechoslovakia	7	Ivo Felix, Josef Hýsek, František Novák, Josef Rusko, Josef Samek, Leoš Škoda, Ján Tánczos
East Germany	8	Matthias Buse, Jochen Danneberg, Bernd Eckstein, Harald Duschek, Henry Glaß, Jürgen Thomas, Martin Weber, Falko Weißpflog
Finland	4	Tauno Käyhkö, Jari Puikkonen, Jouko Törmänen, Kari Ylianttila
France	2	Patric Dubiez, Eric Fourrier
Italy	3	Ermes De Crignis, Lido Tomasi, Ivano Wegher
Japan	2	Yūji Kawamura, Sakae Tsuruga
Norway	6	Per Bergerud, Stein Glømmi, Rune Hauge, Per Steinar Nordlien, Johan Sætre, Jens Unosen
Poland	2	Tadeusz Pawlusiak, Józef Tajner
Soviet Union	7	Aleksey Borovitin, Vladimir Bubjonov, Vladimir Chernyaev, Yury Ivanov, Aleksandr Karapuzov, Valery Savin, Sergey Saychik
Switzerland	7	Oliver Favre, Georges Jaquier, Robert Mösching, Harald Reichenbach, Mario Rinaldi, Walter Steiner, Hansjörg Sumi
United States	5	Jeff Davis, Jeff Denney, Jim Denney, John Denney, Kip Sundgaard
Yugoslavia	5	Zdravko Bogataj, Andrej Kaizer, Marko Mlakar, Bogdan Norčič, Ivo Zupan

== Results ==
=== Oberstdorf ===
(West Germany) Schattenbergschanze, Oberstdorf
30 December 1977

Rank	Name	Points
1	(East Germany) Matthias Buse	118.2
2	(East Germany) Martin Weber	110.1
3	(Finland) Kari Ylianttila	109.3
4	(East Germany) Bernd Eckstein	105.7
5	(West Germany) Peter Leitner	105.1
6	(East Germany) Jochen Danneberg	104.7
7	(Switzerland) Walter Steiner	101.3
8	(East Germany) Henry Glaß	94.8
9	(Japan) Sakae Tsuruga	92.3
10	(Norway) Per Bergerud	91.9

=== Garmisch-Partenkirchen ===
(West Germany) Große Olympiaschanze, Garmisch-Partenkirchen
1 January 1978

Rank	Name	Points
1	(East Germany) Jochen Danneberg	235.6
2	(Finland) Kari Ylianttila	222.2
3	(East Germany) Henry Glaß	219.6
4	(East Germany) Falko Weißpflog	218.3
5	(Czechoslovakia) Leoš Škoda	213.0
6	(East Germany) Matthias Buse	212.0
7	(East Germany) Bernd Eckstein	209.0
8	(West Germany) Peter Leitner	208.6
9	(Switzerland) Walter Steiner	207.5
10	(East Germany) Jürgen Thomas	204.8

=== Innsbruck ===
(Austria) Bergiselschanze, Innsbruck
4 January 1978

Rank	Name	Points
1	(Norway) Per Bergerud	247.1
2	(Finland) Kari Ylianttila	239.1
3	(Finland) Jouko Törmänen	231.2
4	(East Germany) Falko Weißpflog	229.2
5	(Austria) Klaus Tuchscherer	227.3
6	(East Germany) Matthias Buse	223.3
7	(Finland) Jari Puikkonen	219.0
8	(East Germany) Martin Weber	218.5
9	(East Germany) Bernd Eckstein	207.9
10	(East Germany) Henry Glaß	203.5

=== Bischofshofen ===
(Austria) Paul-Ausserleitner-Schanze, Bischofshofen
6 January 1978

Rank	Name	Points
1	(Finland) Kari Ylianttila	242.3
2	(Switzerland) Walter Steiner	229.0
3	(East Germany) Henry Glaß	227.9
4	(East Germany) Martin Weber	227.5
5	(East Germany) Falko Weißpflog	221.1
6	(East Germany) Bernd Eckstein	220.8
7	(East Germany) Matthias Buse	219.7
8	(Norway) Per Bergerud	218.9
9	(East Germany) Harald Duschek	217.2
10	(Finland) Jouko Törmänen	209.7

== Final ranking ==
Rank	Name	Oberstdorf	Garmisch-Partenkirchen	Innsbruck	Bischofshofen	Points
1	(Finland) Kari Ylianttila	3rd	2nd	2nd	1st	812.9
2	(East Germany) Matthias Buse	1st	6th	6th	7th	773.2
3	(East Germany) Martin Weber	2nd	11th	8th	4th	760.4
4	(East Germany) Henry Glaß	8th	3rd	10th	3rd	760.2
5	(East Germany) Falko Weißpflog	14th	4th	4th	5th	757.4
6	(East Germany) Bernd Eckstein	4th	7th	9th	6th	753.6
7	(Norway) Per Bergerud	10th	22nd	1st	8th	749.7
8	(Switzerland) Walter Steiner	7th	9th	24th	2nd	734.4
9	(Finland) Jouko Törmänen	16th	15th	3rd	10th	727.8
10	(East Germany) Harald Duschek	11th	18th	11th	9th	718.8
