= 1979–80 FIS Ski Jumping World Cup =

Ski jumping championship season

1979–80 World Cup
Winners
- Overall: (Austria) Hubert Neuper
- Four Hills Tournament: (Austria) Hubert Neuper
- Swiss Tournament: (Norway) Roger Ruud
- K.O.P. Ski Flying Week: (Norway) Per Bergerud
- Nations Cup: Austria

Competitions
- Venues: 18
- Individual: 25

The 1979–80 FIS Ski Jumping World Cup was the first World Cup season in ski jumping.

It began in Cortina d'Ampezzo, Italy on 27 December 1979 and has finished in Štrbské Pleso, Czechoslovakia on 25 March 1980. The individual World Cup overall winner was Hubert Neuper, who also won the Four Hills Tournament. The Nations Cup winner was Team of Austria.

The event in Vikersund, Norway took place over three days from 29 February to 2 March 1980, with the second day of competition being cancelled due to strong winds. The total points from the first and last competitions counted as a single WC win: this remains the only time in World Cup history when the results from more than one event counted as a single combined event.

25 men's individual events on 18 different venues in 14 countries were held. Peaks of the season were Olympics, 4H Tournament, Swiss Tournament and K.O.P. International Ski Flying Week.

Competitions were held on three different continents; Europe, Asia and North America.

== Map of all world cup hosts ==
Europe
West Germany	Austria Canada	Asia

== Calendar ==
=== Men's Individual ===
N – normal hill / L – large hill / F – flying hill
All	No.	Date	Place (Hill)	Size	Winner	Second	Third	Overall leader (Note: Yellow bib for the overall leader was introduced later, from the 1988/89 season onwards.)	R.
1	1	27 December 1979	(Italy) Cortina d'Ampezzo (Trampolino Olimpico K92)	N _{001}	(Austria) Toni Innauer	(Austria) Hubert Neuper	(Austria) Alfred Groyer	(Austria) Toni Innauer	
2	2	30 December 1979	(West Germany) Oberstdorf (Schattenbergschanze K115)	L _{001}	(East Germany) Jochen Danneberg	(Austria) Hubert Neuper	(Austria) Alfred Groyer	(Austria) Hubert Neuper	
3	3	1 January 1980	(West Germany) Garmisch-Pa (Große Olympiaschanze K107)	L _{002}	(Austria) Hubert Neuper	(Finland) Jari Puikkonen	(Norway) Johan Sætre	(Austria) Hubert Neuper	
4	4	4 January 1980	(Austria) Innsbruck (Bergiselschanze K106)	L _{003}	(Austria) Hubert Neuper	(Switzerland) Hansjörg Sumi	(East Germany) Henry Glaß	(Austria) Hubert Neuper	
5	5	6 January 1980	(Austria) Bischofshofen (Paul-Ausserleitner K106)	L _{004}	(East Germany) Martin Weber	(East Germany) Henry Glaß	(Poland) Piotr Fijas	(Austria) Hubert Neuper	
28th Four Hills Tournament Overall (30 December 1979 – 6 January 1980)					(Austria) Hubert Neuper	(East Germany) Henry Glaß	(East Germany) Martin Weber	4H Tournament	
6	6	12 January 1980	(Japan) Sapporo (Ōkurayama K110)	L _{005}	(Japan) Hirokazu Yagi	(Socialist Federal Republic of Yugoslavia) Bogdan Norčič	(Austria) Armin Kogler	(Austria) Hubert Neuper	
7	7	13 January 1980	(Japan) Sapporo (Ōkurayama K110)	L _{006}	(Japan) Masahiro Akimoto	(Japan) Hirokazu Yagi	(Socialist Federal Republic of Yugoslavia) Bogdan Norčič	(Austria) Hubert Neuper	
8	8	19 January 1980	(Canada) Thunder Bay (Big Thunder K89/K120)	N _{002}	(Austria) Armin Kogler	(France) Bernard Moullier	(Austria) Alfred Groyer	(Austria) Hubert Neuper	
9	9	20 January 1980	(Canada) Thunder Bay (Big Thunder K89/K120)	L _{007}	(Austria) Armin Kogler	(Austria) Hubert Neuper	(Austria) Toni Innauer	(Austria) Hubert Neuper	
10	10	26 January 1980	(Poland) Zakopane (Średnia Krokiew K89) (Wielka Krokiew K115)	N _{003}	(Poland) Stanisław Bobak	(Norway) Ivar Mobekk	(East Germany) Olaf Schmidt	(Austria) Hubert Neuper	
11	11	27 January 1980	(Poland) Zakopane (Średnia Krokiew K89) (Wielka Krokiew K115)	L _{008}	(Poland) Piotr Fijas	(Poland) Stanisław Bobak	(Norway) Ivar Mobekk	(Austria) Hubert Neuper	
12	12	9 February 1980	(France) Saint Nizier (Dauphiné K112)	L _{009}	(Poland) Piotr Fijas	(Austria) Hans Wallner	(Poland) Stanisław Bobak	(Austria) Hubert Neuper	
13	13	10 February 1980	(France) Saint Nizier (Dauphiné K112)	L _{010}	(Norway) Tom Christiansen	(Austria) Alois Lipburger	(Norway) Tom Levorstad	(Austria) Hubert Neuper	
1980 Winter Olympics (17 – 23 February • (United States) Lake Placid)
14	14	27 February 1980	(Switzerland) St. Moritz (Olympiaschanze K94)	N _{004}	(Norway) Roger Ruud	(Norway) Johan Sætre	(Switzerland) Robert Mösching	(Austria) Hubert Neuper	
15	15	29 February 1980	(Switzerland) Gstaad (Mattenschanze K88)	N _{005}	(Switzerland) Hansjörg Sumi	(Norway) Roger Ruud	(Austria) Hubert Neuper	(Austria) Hubert Neuper	
16	16	2 March 1980	(Switzerland) Engelberg (Gross-Titlis-Schanze K116)	L _{011}	(Austria) Toni Innauer	(Norway) Johan Sætre	(Switzerland) Hansjörg Sumi	(Austria) Hubert Neuper	
17th Swiss Tournament Overall (27 February – 2 March 1980)					(Norway) Roger Ruud	(Norway) Johan Sætre	(Switzerland) Hansjörg Sumi	Swiss Tournament	
17	17	29 February 1980	(Norway) Vikersund (Vikersundbakken K155)	F _{001}	(Norway) Per Bergerud	(Poland) Stanisław Bobak	(Czechoslovakia) Ján Tánczoš	(Austria) Hubert Neuper	
17	17	1 March 1980	(Norway) Vikersund (Vikersundbakken K155)	F _{001}	(Norway) Per Bergerud	(Poland) Stanisław Bobak	(Czechoslovakia) Ján Tánczoš	(Austria) Hubert Neuper	
17	17	2 March 1980	(Norway) Vikersund (Vikersundbakken K155)	F _{001}	(Norway) Per Bergerud	(Poland) Stanisław Bobak	(Czechoslovakia) Ján Tánczoš	(Austria) Hubert Neuper	
26th K.O.P. International Ski Flying Week Overall (29 February – 2 March 1980)					(Norway) Per Bergerud	(Poland) Stanisław Bobak	(Czechoslovakia) Ján Tánczoš	K.O.P.	
18	18	8 March 1980	(Finland) Lahti (Salpausselkä K88, K113)	N _{006}	(Austria) Armin Kogler	(Austria) Hubert Neuper	(Finland) Jouko Törmänen	(Austria) Hubert Neuper	
19	19	9 March 1980	(Finland) Lahti (Salpausselkä K88, K113)	L _{012}	(Canada) Steve Collins	(Finland) Jouko Törmänen	(Austria) Hubert Neuper	(Austria) Hubert Neuper	
20	20	11 March 1980	(Sweden) Falun (Lugnet K89)	N _{007}	(Finland) Jouko Törmänen	(Finland) Jari Puikkonen	(Austria) Armin Kogler	(Austria) Hubert Neuper	
21	21	16 March 1980	(Norway) Oslo (Holmenkollbakken K105)	L _{013}	(Austria) Armin Kogler	(Finland) Jari Puikkonen	(Austria) Hubert Neuper	(Austria) Hubert Neuper	
22	22	21 March 1980	(Socialist Federal Republic of Yugoslavia) Planica (Srednja Bloudkova K92) (Bloudkova velikanka K117)	N _{008}	(Austria) Hans Millonig	(Austria) Armin Kogler	(Socialist Federal Republic of Yugoslavia) Primož Ulaga	(Austria) Hubert Neuper	
23	23	22 March 1980	(Socialist Federal Republic of Yugoslavia) Planica (Srednja Bloudkova K92) (Bloudkova velikanka K117)	L _{014}	(Austria) Hubert Neuper	(Austria) Armin Kogler	(Austria) Hans Millonig	(Austria) Hubert Neuper	
24	24	24 March 1980	(Czechoslovakia) Štrbské Pleso (MS 1970 A K110)	L _{015}	(Japan) Masahiro Akimoto	(West Germany) Peter Leitner	(Japan) Hirokazu Yagi	(Austria) Hubert Neuper	
25	25	25 March 1980	(Czechoslovakia) Štrbské Pleso (MS 1970 A K110)	L _{016}	(Austria) Armin Kogler	(Austria) Hans Millonig	(Austria) Hubert Neuper	(Austria) Hubert Neuper	
1st FIS World Cup Overall (27 December 1979 – 25 March 1980)					(Austria) Hubert Neuper	(Austria) Armin Kogler	(Poland) Stanisław Bobak	World Cup Overall	

== Standings ==
=== Overall ===
Rank	after 25 events	Points
1	(Austria) Hubert Neuper	238
2	(Austria) Armin Kogler	220
3	(Poland) Stanisław Bobak	130
4	(Japan) Hirokazu Yagi	116
5	(Japan) Masahiro Akimoto	109
6	(Austria) Hans Millonig (Norway) Johan Sætre	108
8	(Switzerland) Hansjörg Sumi	102
9	(Austria) Toni Innauer	95
10	(Austria) Hans Wallner	87

=== Nations Cup ===
Rank	after 25 events	Points
1	Austria	1035
2	Norway	524
3	Japan	314
4	East Germany	296
5	Finland	249
6	Poland	229
7	Switzerland	158
8	Yugoslavia	135
9	Canada	106
10	Czechoslovakia	84

=== Four Hills Tournament ===
Rank	after 4 events	Points
1	(Austria) Hubert Neuper	940.1
2	(East Germany) Henry Glaß	912.9
3	(East Germany) Martin Weber	912.7
4	(East Germany) Klaus Ostwald	912.3
5	(Austria) Alfred Groyer	904.0
6	(East Germany) Harald Duschek	897.0
7	(East Germany) Jochen Danneberg	893.4
8	(Poland) Piotr Fijas	888.3
9	(Norway) Johan Sætre	885.2
10	(Soviet Union) Vladimir Vlassov	880.9

=== Swiss Tournament ===
Rank	after 3 events	Points
1	(Norway) Roger Ruud	737.6
2	(Norway) Johan Sætre	727.0
3	(Switzerland) Hansjörg Sumi	725.7
4	(Soviet Union) Sergey Saychik	684.7
5	(United States) Reed Zuehlke	673.9
6	(Austria) Willi Pürstl	671.5
7	(Soviet Union) Pjotr Sunin	668.7
8	(Switzerland) Robert Mösching	659.4
9	(Norway) Ulf Jørgensen	655.9
10	(Italy) Lido Tomasi	55.1
