= List of Norwegian world cup victories in ski jumping =

Between 1980 and 1982, Norwegian male competitors including Roger Ruud, Per Bergerud and Ole Bremseth won ski jumping events within the Ski Jumping World Cup.

== Men ==
No.	Season	Date	Winner	Location	Hill	Size
1	1979/80	10 February 1980	Tom Christiansen	(France) Saint-Nizier	Dauphine K117	LH
2	1979/80	27 February 1980	Roger Ruud	(Switzerland) St. Moritz	Olympiaschanze K94	NH
3	1979/80	2 March 1980	Per Bergerud	(Norway) Vikersund	Vikersundbakken K155	FH
4	1980/81	10 January 1981	Roger Ruud	(Czechoslovakia) Harrachov	Čerťák K120	LH
5	1980/81	11 January 1981	Roger Ruud	(Czechoslovakia) Liberec	Ještěd K88	NH
6	1980/81	23 January 1981	Johan Sætre	(Switzerland) Gstaad	Mattenschanze K88	NH
7	1980/81	25 January 1981	Per Bergerud	(Switzerland) Engelberg	Gross-Titlis-Schanze K116	LH
8	1980/81	26 February 1981	Roger Ruud	(France) Chamonix	Le Mont K95	NH
9	1980/81	28 February 1981	Roger Ruud	(France) Saint-Nizier	Dauphine K112	LH
10	1980/81	15 March 1981	Roger Ruud	(Norway) Oslo	Holmenkollbakken K105	LH
11	1980/81	22 March 1981	Dag Holmen-Jensen	(Socialist Federal Republic of Yugoslavia) Planica	Bloudkova velikanka K120	LH
12	1981/82	20 December 1981	Roger Ruud	(Italy) Cortina d’Ampezzo	Trampolino Olimpico Italia K92	NH
13	1981/82	1 January 1982	Roger Ruud	(West Germany) Garmisch-Partenkirchen	Große Olympiaschanze K107	LH
14	1981/82	3 January 1982	Per Bergerud	(Austria) Innsbruck	Bergiselschanze K104	LH
15	1981/82	4 March 1982	Ole Bremseth	(Finland) Lahti	Salpausselkä K88	NH
16	1981/82	7 March 1982	Ole Bremseth	(Finland) Lahti	Salpausselkä K88	NH
17	1981/82	20 March 1982	Ole Bremseth	(Czechoslovakia) Štrbské Pleso	MS 1970 A K110	LH
18	1981/82	21 March 1982	Ole Bremseth	(Czechoslovakia) Štrbské Pleso	MS 1970 B K88	NH
19	1981/82	27 March 1982	Ole Bremseth	(Socialist Federal Republic of Yugoslavia) Planica	Srednja Bloudkova K90	NH
20	1981/82	28 March 1982	Ole Bremseth	(Socialist Federal Republic of Yugoslavia) Planica	Bloudkova velikanka K120	LH
