= 1979–80 Four Hills Tournament =

Ski jumping competition

The 1979-80 Four Hills Tournament took place at the four traditional venues of Oberstdorf, Garmisch-Partenkirchen, Innsbruck and Bischofshofen, located in Germany and Austria, between 29 December 1979 and 6 January 1980.

== Results ==
Date	Place	Hill	Size	Winner	Second	Third	Ref.
30 Dec 1979	(West Germany) Oberstdorf	Schattenbergschanze K-110	LH	(East Germany) Jochen Danneberg	(Austria) Hubert Neuper	(Austria) Alfred Groyer	
1 Jan 1980	(West Germany) Garmisch-Partenkirchen	Große Olympiaschanze K-107	LH	(Austria) Hubert Neuper	(Finland) Jari Puikkonen	(Norway) Johan Sætre	
4 Jan 1980	(Austria) Innsbruck	Bergiselschanze K-104	LH	(Austria) Hubert Neuper	(Switzerland) Hansjörg Sumi	(East Germany) Henry Glaß	
6 Jan 1980	(Austria) Bischofshofen	Paul-Ausserleitner-Schanze K-109	LH	(East Germany) Martin Weber	(East Germany) Henry Glaß	(Poland) Piotr Fijas	

== Overall ==
Pos	Ski Jumper	Points
1	(Austria) Hubert Neuper	940.1
2	(East Germany) Henry Glaß	912.9
3	(East Germany) Martin Weber	912.7
4	(East Germany) Klaus Ostwald	912.3
5	(Austria) Alfred Groyer	904.0
6	(East Germany) Harald Duschek	897.0
7	(East Germany) Jochen Danneberg	893.4
8	(Poland) Piotr Fijas	888.3
9	(Norway) Johan Sætre	885.2
10	(Soviet Union) Vladimir Vlassov	880.9
