= Dauphine (ski jump hill) =

Ski jumping hill in Saint-Nizier-du-Moucherotte near Grenoble, France

Coordinates: 45.1653°N 5.6350°E

- Location: Saint-Nizier-du-Moucherotte; France
- Opened: 1966
- Closed: 1990

Size
- K–point: K-112
- Hill record: 111 m (364 ft) (Norway) Roger Ruud (20 February 1981)

Dauphine is an abandoned ski jumping large hill in Saint-Nizier-du-Moucherotte, France. It hosted the ski jumping large hill portion of the 1968 Winter Olympics.

== History ==
The hill opened in 1966. It was constructed by German architect Heini Klopfer and French architect Pierre Delloz. After the Olympics, it hosted FIS Ski Jumping World Cup events in 1980 and 1981. The ski jump closed in 1990 and currently sits disused.

== World Cup ==
=== Men ===
Date	Size	Winner	Second	Third
9 Feb 1980	K-112	(Poland) Piotr Fijas	(Austria) Hans Wallner	(Poland) Stanisław Bobak
10 Feb 1980	K-112	(Norway) Tom Christiansen	(Austria) Alois Lipburger	(Norway) Tom Levorstad
28 Feb 1981	K-112	(Norway) Roger Ruud	(Norway) Ivar Mobekk	(Austria) Ernst Vettori
