= Brane Benedik =

Slovenian ski jumper

Personal information
- Nationality: Slovenian
- Born: 22 June 1960 (age 64); Kranj, Yugoslavia

Sport
- Sport: Ski jumping

Brane Benedik (born 22 June 1960) is a Slovenian ski jumper. He competed in the normal hill and large hill events at the 1980 Winter Olympics.
