= Dag Holmen-Jensen =

Norwegian former ski jumper (born 1954)

Personal information
- Nationality: Norway
- Born: 16 May 1954 (age 72)

Sport
- Sport: Skiing

World Cup career
- Seasons: 1980–1983
- Indiv. starts: 6
- Indiv. podiums: 1
- Indiv. wins: 1
- Updated on 10 February 2016

Dag Holmen-Jensen (born 16 May 1954) is a Norwegian former ski jumper.

== Career ==
Dag Holmen-Jensen won the World Cup in 1981 on Bloudkova velikanka in Planica. He never performed at any Winter Olympic Games or FIS Nordic World Ski Championships.

== World Cup ==
=== Standings ===
Season	Overall	4H
1979/80	64	44
1980/81	17	—
1981/82	17	8
1982/83	46	—

=== Wins ===
No.	Season	Date	Location	Hill	Size
1	1980/81	22 March 1981	(Socialist Federal Republic of Yugoslavia) Planica	Bloudkova velikanka K120	LH
