= Jan Holmlund =

Swedish ski jumper (1957–2026)

Personal information
- Nationality: Swedish
- Born: 29 March 1957 Gällivare, Sweden
- Died: 11 March 2026 (aged 68)

Sport
- Sport: Ski jumping

Jan Henry Holmlund (29 March 1957 – 11 March 2026) was a Swedish ski jumper. He competed in the normal hill and large hill events at the 1980 Winter Olympics. Holmlund died on 11 March 2026, at the age of 68.
