= Tom Christiansen (ski jumper) =

Norwegian former ski jumper

Personal information
- Nationality: Norway
- Born: 3 February 1956 (age 70) Oslo, Norway

Sport
- Sport: Skiing

World Cup career
- Seasons: 1980
- Indiv. starts: 4
- Indiv. podiums: 1
- Indiv. wins: 1
- Updated on 10 February 2016

Tom Christiansen (born 3 February 1956) is a Norwegian former ski jumper who competed in the World Cup 1979–80.

== World Cup ==
=== Standings ===
Season	Overall
1979/80	27

=== Wins ===
No.	Season	Date	Location	Hill	Size
1	1979/80	10 February 1980	(France) St. Nizier	Dauphine K112	LH
