= Ski jumping at the 1980 Winter Olympics =

Ski jumping at the XIII Olympic Winter Games
- Pictogram for ski jumping
- Venue: Lake Placid Olympic Ski Jumping Complex
- Dates: February 17–23, 1980
- Competitors: 55 from 16 nations

Ski jumping at the 1980 Winter Olympics consisted of two events held from 17 February to 23 February, taking place at Lake Placid Olympic Ski Jumping Complex.

== Medal summary ==
=== Medal table ===
Rank	Nation	Gold	Silver	Bronze	Total
1	Austria	1	1	0	2
2	Finland	1	0	1	2
3	East Germany	0	1	0	1
3	Japan	0	1	0	1
Totals (4 entries)		2	3	1	6

Austria led the medal table with one gold and one silver medal. A tie in the normal hill competition meant that two silver and no bronze medals were awarded in that event.

=== Events ===
Event	Gold		Silver		Bronze	
Normal hill	Toni Innauer; Austria	266.3	Hirokazu Yagi; Japan; Manfred Deckert; East Germany	249.2	not awarded as there was a tie for silver	
Large hill	Jouko Törmänen; Finland	271.0	Hubert Neuper; Austria	262.4	Jari Puikkonen; Finland	248.5

== Participating NOCs ==
Eighteen nations participated in ski jumping at the Lake Placid Games. Bulgaria and Spain made their Olympic ski jumping debuts.

- Austria (5)
- Bulgaria (1)
- Canada (3)
- Spain (2)
- Finland (4)
- France (2)
- West Germany (3)
- East Germany (6)
- Italy (1)
- Japan (5)
- Norway (4)
- Poland (4)
- Switzerland (4)
- Sweden (1)
- Czechoslovakia (2)
- Soviet Union (4)
- United States (6)
- Yugoslavia (3)
