= Pjotr Sunin =

Soviet ski jumper (1958–2025)

Personal information
- Full name: Pjotr Sunin

Sport
- Sport: Skiing

World Cup career
- Seasons: 1980–1981
- Indiv. podiums: 1
- Updated on 30 Mar 2015

Pjotr Sunin (5 July 1958 – 8 April 2025) was a Soviet ski jumper.
