= Andrey Shakirov =

Soviet ski jumper

Personal information
- Nationality: Soviet
- Born: 3 February 1960 (age 65)

Sport
- Sport: Ski jumping

Andrey Shakirov (born 3 February 1960) is a Soviet ski jumper. He competed in the normal hill and large hill events at the 1980 Winter Olympics.
