= Takafumi Kawabata =

Japanese ski jumper

Personal information
- Nationality: Japanese
- Born: 26 June 1954 (age 71) Hokkaido, Japan

Sport
- Sport: Ski jumping

Achievements and titles
- Olympic finals: 1980 Winter Olympics

Takafumi Kawabata (川端 隆普美, Kawabata Takafumi; born 26 June 1954) is a Japanese ski jumper. He competed in the normal hill and large hill events at the 1980 Winter Olympics.
