= Jon Eilert Bøgseth =

Norwegian ski jumper (born 1959)

Personal information
- Full name: Jon Eilert Bøgseth
- Born: 22 February 1959 (age 67)

Sport
- Sport: Skiing
- Club: Namdalseid IL

World Cup career
- Seasons: 1981; 1983
- Indiv. podiums: 1
- Updated on 30 March 2015

Jon Eilert Bøgseth (born 22 February 1959) is a Norwegian former ski jumper.
