= Stanisław Pawlusiak =

Polish ski jumper (born 1958)

Personal information
- Nationality: Polish
- Born: 30 April 1958 (age 66); Wilkowice, Poland

Sport
- Sport: Ski jumping

Stanisław Pawlusiak (born 30 April 1958) is a Polish ski jumper. He competed in the normal hill and large hill events at the 1980 Winter Olympics.
