= Masahiro Akimoto =

Japanese former ski jumper

Masahiro Akimoto 秋元 正博
Personal information
- Full name: 秋元 正博
- Nationality: Japan
- Born: 3 September 1956 (age 70) Sapporo, Hokkaido, Japan
- Height: 1.75 m (5 ft 9 in)

Sport
- Sport: Skiing

World Cup career
- Seasons: 1980–1982; 1984–1986; 1988
- Indiv. starts: 46
- Indiv. podiums: 8
- Indiv. wins: 4
- Updated on 9 December 2022

Masahiro Akimoto (秋元 正博, Akimoto Masahiro) (born 3 September 1956) is a Japanese former ski jumper.

== Career ==
He competed from 1980 to 1986. He finished fourth in the individual large hill event at the 1980 Winter Olympics in Lake Placid, New York. Akimoto's best finish at the FIS Nordic World Ski Championships was sixth in the team large hill events at Seefeld, Austria in 1985. He earned a total of four World Cup wins from 1980 to 1985.

== World Cup ==
=== Standings ===
Season	Overall	4H
1979/80	5	31
1980/81	40	11
1981/82	25	32
1983/84	24	—
1984/85	8	—
1985/86	23	24
1988/89	—	—

=== Wins ===
No.	Season	Date	Location	Hill	Size
1	1979/80	13 January 1980	(Japan) Sapporo	Ōkurayama K110	LH
2	1979/80	24 March 1980	(Czechoslovakia) Štrbské Pleso	MS 1970 A K110	LH
3	1983/84	21 January 1984	(Japan) Sapporo	Miyanomori K90	NH
4	1984/85	10 February 1985	(Japan) Sapporo	Ōkurayama K110	LH
