= 1980–81 FIS Ski Jumping World Cup =

Ski jumping championship season

1980–81 World Cup
Winners
- Overall: (Austria) Armin Kogler
- Four Hills Tournament: (Austria) Hubert Neuper
- Swiss Tournament: (Austria) Armin Kogler
- Bohemia Tournament: (Norway) Roger Ruud
- K.O.P. Ski Flying Week: (Austria) Alois Lipburger
- Nations Cup: Austria

Competitions
- Venues: 19
- Individual: 24
- Cancelled: 4

The 1980–81 FIS Ski Jumping World Cup was the second World Cup season in ski jumping.

The season began in Oberstdorf, West Germany on 30 December 1980 and it finished in Planica, Yugoslavia on 22 March 1981. The individual World Cup overall winner was Austrian ski jumper Armin Kogler and Nations Cup winner was Team of Austria.

24 men's individual events on 19 different venues in 12 countries were held. Three scheduled World Cup events in Zakopane and Cortina d'Ampezzo were completely canceled and one ski flying event in Ironwood (due to strong wind) was also cancelled. Ironwood and Sapporo hosted World Cup at the same time on two different venues, the first and last time in history.

Peaks of the season were FIS Ski Flying World Championships, Four Hills Tournament, Bohemia Tournament, Swiss Tournament and K.O.P. International Ski Flying Week. Competitions were held on three different continents this season; Europe, Asia and North America.

On 26 February 1981, Austrian ski jumper Armin Kogler, set and improved his own world record in Oberstdorf at 180 metres (591 ft), from previous year (that he set in Harrachov).

== World record ==
List of world record distances achieved within this World Cup season.

Date	Athlete	Hill	Round	Place	Metres	Feet
26 February 1981	(Austria) Armin Kogler	Heini-Klopfer-Skiflugschanze K175	Training R1	Oberstdorf, West Germany	180	591

== Map of world cup hosts ==
Europe
West Germany	Austria Asia	North America

== Calendar ==
=== Men's Individual ===
N – normal hill / L – large hill / F – flying hill
All	No.	Date	Place (Hill)	Size	Winner	Second	Third	Overall leader (Note: Yellow bib for the overall leader was introduced later, from the 1988/89 season onwards.)	R.
		21 December 1980	(Italy) Cortina d’Ampezzo (Trampolino Olimpico K92)	N _{cnx}	cancelled due to lack of snow			—	
26	1	30 December 1980	(West Germany) Oberstdorf (Schattenbergschanze K110)	L _{017}	(Austria) Hubert Neuper	(Finland) Jari Puikkonen	(Norway) Roger Ruud	(Austria) Hubert Neuper	
27	2	1 January 1981	(West Germany) Garmisch-Pa (Große Olympiaschanze K107)	L _{018}	(Canada) Horst Bulau	(Norway) Per Bergerud	(Austria) Armin Kogler	(Austria) Hubert Neuper	
28	3	4 January 1981	(Austria) Innsbruck (Bergiselschanze K104)	L _{019}	(Finland) Jari Puikkonen	(Austria) Hubert Neuper	(Austria) Armin Kogler	(Austria) Hubert Neuper	
29	4	6 January 1981	(Austria) Bischofshofen (Paul-Ausserleitner K109)	L _{020}	(Austria) Armin Kogler	(Austria) Hubert Neuper	(Norway) Per Bergerud	(Austria) Hubert Neuper	
29th Four Hills Tournament Overall (30 December 1980 – 6 January 1981)					(Austria) Hubert Neuper	(Austria) Armin Kogler	(Finland) Jari Puikkonen	4H Tournament	
30	5	10 January 1981	(Czechoslovakia) Harrachov (Čerťák K120)	L _{021}	(Norway) Roger Ruud	(Austria) Armin Kogler	(Norway) Per Bergerud (Austria) Hubert Neuper	(Austria) Hubert Neuper	
31	6	11 January 1981	(Czechoslovakia) Liberec (Ještěd B K88)	N _{009}	(Norway) Roger Ruud	(Austria) Hans Wallner	(Soviet Union) Pjotr Sunin	(Austria) Hubert Neuper	
18th Bohemia Tournament Overall (10 – 11 January 1981)					(Norway) Roger Ruud	(Austria) Armin Kogler	(Austria) Hans Wallner	Bohemia Tournament	
		17 January 1981	(Poland) Zakopane (Średnia Krokiew K82) (Wielka Krokiew K115)	N _{cnx}	cancelled due to lack of snow			—	
		18 January 1981	(Poland) Zakopane (Średnia Krokiew K82) (Wielka Krokiew K115)	L _{cnx}	cancelled due to lack of snow			—	
32	7	21 January 1981	(Switzerland) St. Moritz (Olympiaschanze K94)	N _{010}	(Austria) Hubert Neuper	(Norway) Roger Ruud	(Austria) Armin Kogler	(Austria) Hubert Neuper	
33	8	23 January 1981	(Switzerland) Gstaad (Mattenschanze K88)	N _{011}	(Norway) Johan Sætre	(Austria) Armin Kogler	(Norway) Roger Ruud	(Austria) Hubert Neuper	
34	9	25 January 1981	(Switzerland) Engelberg (Gross-Titlis-Schanze K116)	L _{022}	(Norway) Per Bergerud	(Austria) Armin Kogler	(Finland) Pentti Kokkonen	(Austria) Hubert Neuper	
18th Swiss Tournament Overall (21 – 25 January 1981)					(Austria) Armin Kogler	(Austria) Hubert Neuper	(Norway) Johan Sætre	Swiss Tournament	
35	10	13 February 1981	(United States) Ironwood (Copper Peak K145)	F _{002}	(Austria) Alois Lipburger	(Austria) Andreas Felder	(United States) John Broman	(Austria) Hubert Neuper	
36	11	14 February 1981	(United States) Ironwood (Copper Peak K145)	F _{003}	(Austria) Alois Lipburger	(Austria) Andreas Felder	(Austria) Fritz Koch	(Austria) Hubert Neuper	
		15 February 1981	(United States) Ironwood (Copper Peak K145)	F _{cnx}	cancelled due to strong wind			—	
28th K.O.P. International Ski Flying Week Overall (13 – 15 February 1981)					(Austria) Alois Lipburger	(Austria) Andreas Felder	(United States) John Broman	K.O.P.	
37	12	14 February 1981	(Japan) Sapporo (Ōkurayama K110)	L _{023}	(Austria) Armin Kogler	(Norway) Ole Bremseth	(Austria) Hubert Neuper	(Austria) Hubert Neuper	
38	13	15 February 1981	(Japan) Sapporo (Ōkurayama K110)	L _{024}	(Austria) Hans Wallner	(Norway) Ole Bremseth	(Austria) Armin Kogler	(Austria) Hubert Neuper	
39	14	21 February 1981	(Canada) Thunder Bay (Big Thunder K89, K120)	N _{012}	(Socialist Federal Republic of Yugoslavia) Primož Ulaga	(Norway) Johan Sætre	(Canada) Steve Collins	(Austria) Hubert Neuper	
40	15	22 February 1981	(Canada) Thunder Bay (Big Thunder K89, K120)	L _{025}	(United States) John Broman	(Norway) Ivar Mobekk	(Austria) Andreas Felder	(Austria) Hubert Neuper	
41	16	26 February 1981	(France) Chamonix (Le Mont K95)	N _{013}	(Norway) Roger Ruud	(Norway) Jon Eilert Bøgseth	(Austria) Ernst Vettori	(Austria) Hubert Neuper	
FIS Ski Flying World Championships 1981 (27 February • (Germany) Oberstdorf)
42	17	28 February 1981	(France) Saint Nizier (Dauphine K112)	L _{026}	(Norway) Roger Ruud	(Norway) Ivar Mobekk	(Austria) Ernst Vettori	(Norway) Roger Ruud	
43	18	6 March 1981	(Finland) Lahti (Salpausselkä K88, K113)	N _{014}	(Finland) Jari Puikkonen	(Canada) Horst Bulau	(Finland) Pentti Kokkonen	(Norway) Roger Ruud	
44	19	7 March 1981	(Finland) Lahti (Salpausselkä K88, K113)	L _{027}	(Finland) Jari Puikkonen	(Finland) Matti Nykänen	(Canada) Horst Bulau	(Norway) Roger Ruud	
45	20	10 March 1981	(Sweden) Falun (Lugnet K89)	N _{015}	(Austria) Armin Kogler	(Canada) Horst Bulau	(Norway) Johan Sætre	(Austria) Armin Kogler	
46	21	15 March 1981	(Norway) Oslo (Holmenkollbakken K105)	L _{028}	(Norway) Roger Ruud	(Canada) Horst Bulau	(Norway) Johan Sætre	(Norway) Roger Ruud	
47	22	17 March 1981	(Norway) Bærum (Skuibakken K105)	L _{029}	(Canada) Horst Bulau	(Austria) Armin Kogler	(Norway) Roger Ruud	(Norway) Roger Ruud	
48	23	21 March 1981	(Socialist Federal Republic of Yugoslavia) Planica (Srednja Bloudkova K90) (Bloudkova velikanka K120)	N _{016}	(Finland) Jari Puikkonen	(Canada) Horst Bulau	(East Germany) Axel Zitzmann	(Norway) Roger Ruud	
49	24	22 March 1981	(Socialist Federal Republic of Yugoslavia) Planica (Srednja Bloudkova K90) (Bloudkova velikanka K120)	L _{030}	(Norway) Dag Holmen-Jensen	(Austria) Armin Kogler	(Austria) Alfred Groyer	(Austria) Armin Kogler	
2nd FIS World Cup Overall (30 December 1980 – 22 March 1981)					(Austria) Armin Kogler	(Norway) Roger Ruud	(Canada) Horst Bulau	World Cup Overall	

== Standings ==
=== Overall ===
Rank	after 24 events	Points
1	(Austria) Armin Kogler	205
2	(Norway) Roger Ruud	201
3	(Canada) Horst Bulau	179
4	(Austria) Hubert Neuper	166
5	(Finland) Jari Puikkonen	162
6	(Norway) Johan Sætre	142
7	(Austria) Hans Wallner	127
8	(Norway) Per Bergerud	124
9	(Norway) Ivar Mobekk	91
10	(Finland) Pentti Kokkonen	90

=== Nations Cup ===
Rank	after 24 events	Points
1	Austria	983
2	Norway	976
3	Finland	412
4	Canada	254
5	United States	120
6	Yugoslavia	101
7	East Germany	94
8	West Germany	80
9	Soviet Union	68
10	Czechoslovakia	62

=== Four Hills Tournament ===
Rank	after 4 events	Points
1	(Austria) Hubert Neuper	931.0
2	(Austria) Armin Kogler	927.4
3	(Finland) Jari Puikkonen	892.8
4	(Norway) Roger Ruud	891.2
5	(Norway) Per Bergerud	886.8
6	(Austria) Hans Wallner	864.7
7	(Norway) Johan Sætre	864.0
8	(East Germany) Matthias Buse	854.0
9	(Finland) Pentti Kokkonen	841.5
10	(Canada) Horst Bulau	835.8

=== Swiss Tournament ===
Rank	after 3 events	Points
1	(Austria) Armin Kogler	753.6
2	(Austria) Hubert Neuper	740.2
3	(Norway) Johan Sætre	738.8
4	(Finland) Pentti Kokkonen	735.9
5	(Norway) Per Bergerud	732.8
6	(Austria) Hans Wallner	723.4
7	(Austria) Klaus Tuchscherer	715.4
8	(Finland) Jari Puikkonen	707.3
9	(Finland) Kari Ylianttila	703.2
10	(Norway) Roger Ruud	696.9

=== Bohemia Tournament ===
Rank	after 2 events	Points
1	(Norway) Roger Ruud	494.8
2	(Austria) Armin Kogler	480.0
3	(Austria) Hans Wallner	468.7
4	(Norway) Per Bergerud	464.0
5	(Canada) Horst Bulau	459.2
6	(Austria) Hubert Neuper	458.8
7	(Czechoslovakia) Josef Samek	450.6
8	(Czechoslovakia) Leoš Škoda	450.1
9	(Soviet Union) Vladimir Schernajev	446.6
10	(Soviet Union) Pjotr Sunin	444.2

== See also ==
- 1980–81 FIS Europa Cup (2nd level competition)
