= Paul Egloff =

Swiss ski jumper

Personal information
- Nationality: Swiss
- Born: 15 October 1959 (age 65)

Sport
- Sport: Ski jumping

Paul Egloff (born 15 October 1959) is a Swiss ski jumper. He competed in the normal hill and large hill events at the 1980 Winter Olympics.
