= Olaf Schmidt (ski jumper) =

East German ski jumper

Olaf Schmidt is an East German ski jumper.

In the first run in Zakopane within the 1st FIS Ski Jumping World Cup 1979/1980 he placed third.
