= Piotr Fijas =

Polish ski jumper

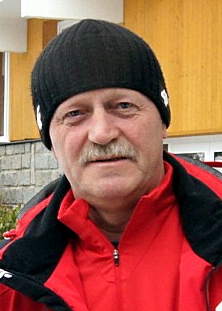

Personal information
- Nationality: Poland
- Born: 27 July 1958 (age 67) Bielsko-Biała, Poland
- Height: 1.89 m (6 ft 2 1/2 in)

Sport
- Sport: Skiing

World Cup career
- Seasons: 1980–1988
- Indiv. starts: 62
- Indiv. podiums: 10
- Indiv. wins: 3

Achievements and titles
- Personal bests: 194 m (636 ft); Planica, 14 March 1987
Medal record
Men's ski flying
FIS Ski Flying World Championships
Bronze medal – third place	1979 Planica	Individual
- Updated on 10 February 2016

Piotr Fijas (born 27 July 1958) is a Polish former ski jumper.

== Career ==
Fijas won a bronze medal at the 1979 FIS Ski Flying World Championships in Planica, Yugoslavia (now Slovenia).

He finished seventh on the individual normal hill at the 1984 Winter Olympics in Sarajevo, and scored three individual World Cup wins between 1980 and 1986, all in individual large hill competitions.

=== The last and all-time world record in parallel style ===
On 14 March 1987, he set the last parallel style ski jumping world record at 194 metres (636 ft) on Velikanka bratov Gorišek in Planica, Yugoslavia. It was held for seven years and only after that period world record was officially discussed and recognized at FIS Autumn meeting in 1994 (as decided at the FIS Congress in Rio de Janeiro), when the controversial "191 metres rule" (Note: This rule was implemented by the FIS in 1987 to curb record-hunting due to safety issues. Distance points would not be awarded beyond 191 m; the jump would still count, but no points further than that could be achieved. During this time, Fijas' world record was officially scaled down to 191 m. This rule was eventually lifted in 1994.) established by World Cup founder Torbjørn Yggeseth, was lifted.

== World Cup ==
=== Standings ===
Season	Overall	4H
1979/80	16	8
1980/81	32	35
1981/82	26	—
1982/83	43	13
1983/84	17	29
1984/85	14	7
1985/86	15	7
1986/87	31	115
1987/88	55	29

=== Wins ===
No.	Season	Date	Location	Hill	Size
1	1979/80	27 January 1980	(Poland) Zakopane	Wielka Krokiew K115	LH
2	1979/80	9 February 1980	(France) St. Nizier	Dauphine K112	LH
3	1985/86	12 January 1986	(Czechoslovakia) Liberec	Ještěd A K115	LH

== Ski jumping world record ==
The last and all-time parallel style ski jumping world record in history.

Date	Hill	Location	Metres	Feet
14 March 1987	Velikanka bratov Gorišek K185	Planica, Yugoslavia	194	636

== Notes ==
Records
Preceded by Andreas Felder	World's longest ski jump 14 March 1987 – 17 March 1994	Succeeded by Martin Höllwarth
