= Okurayama Ski Jump Stadium =

Japanese ski jump venue

Coordinates: 43°3′4.77″N 141°17′24″E

Ōkurayama 大倉山ジャンプ競技場
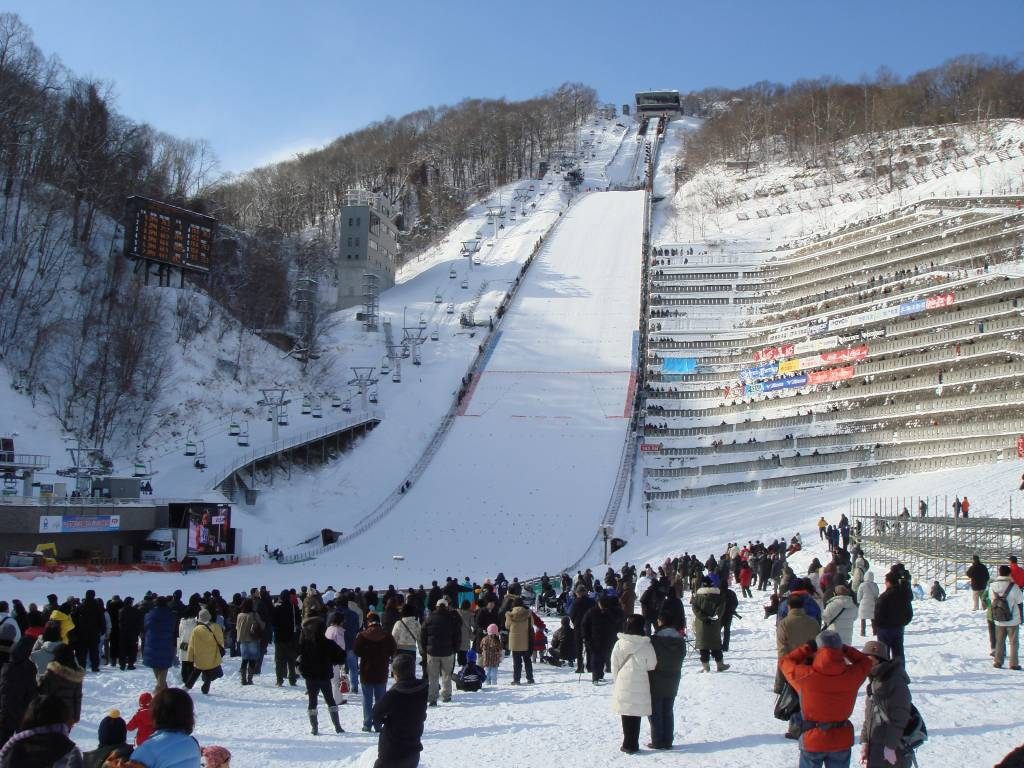
- Location: Miyanomori area, Chūō-ku, Sapporo, Hokkaidō, Japan
- Opened: 1931
- Renovated: 1953, 1970, 1982, 1986, 1996, 1998, 2007

Size
- K–point: 120 m (plastic); 123 m (snow)
- Hill size: 134 m (plastic); 137 m (snow)
- Longest jump (unofficial / fall): 152.5 m (500 ft) (Norway) Robin Pedersen (14 February 2025)
- Hill record: 148.5 m (487 ft) (Poland) Kamil Stoch (26 January 2019)

Top events
- Olympics: 1972
- World Championships: 2007

The Ōkurayama Ski Jump Stadium (大倉山ジャンプ競技場, Ōkurayama Janpu Kyōgijō), also known as the Ōkurayama-Schanze (大倉山シャンツェ, Ōkurayama Shantse) is a ski jumping venue located in the Miyanomori area in Chūō-ku, Sapporo, Hokkaidō, Japan. Owned mostly by Sapporo City, the ski jump is on the eastern slope of the Mt. Okura. The stadium has hosted a number of winter sports events including 1972 Winter Olympics and FIS Nordic World Ski Championships 2007. The area of stadium consists of the Winter Sports Museum, the Ōkurayama Crystal House, and the Mt. Okura Observation Platform, as well as the ski jump.

The stadium has area of 8.2 ha which houses 50,000 people at a maximum during a competition, and the ski jump is categorized as the large hill jump. The total height of the jump hill from the top starting point to the bottom of the slope is 133 metres, also the distance to the K-spot (critical point) is 120 metres.

== History ==
In 1931, the Okurayama Ski Jump Stadium was constructed by Kishichiro Okura with an advice and financial aid of Prince Chichibu, a brother of Hirohito, and was donated to Sapporo after the completion. Another name "Ōkurayama-Schanze" originated with the inauguration ceremony in 1931, when the mayor of Sapporo at that time, Masaharu Hashimoto, named the ski jump as "Ōkura Schanze" after its founder. The term schanze means ski jump in German. The jump and stadium ware designed by Olaf Helset, the president of the Norwegian ski federation.

The stadium was renovated with the national expenditure in 1970, which was to suit in coming 1972 Winter Olympics. After the renovation, the stadium had the K-spot at the point of 110 metres, and was capable of housing 50,000 people. At the same time, the word "yama" ("the mountain" in Japanese) was added to its name, thus the stadium was called the "Ōkurayama Jampu Kyōgijō" (Mt. Okura Ski Jump Stadium) . For the 1972 Winter Olympics, the ski jump was the venue of 90 metres class ski jumping competition.

The ski jump was remodeled many times under advice from the International Ski Federation, and the ski lift toward top of the mountain in 1982, and the distance of the K-spot was extended to 115 metres in 1986, and 120 metres in 1996.

The stadium has been under the jurisdiction of the government of Japan until 1995, when it was switched as a facility under the control of Sapporo. In 1998, the ski jump in the stadium was remodeled to include the Summer Hill, a ski jump which enables skiers to jump even in the summer. Also the ski lift was extended, and lighting was installed for night competitions. In 2005, the monument of the Ballad of the Rainbow and Snow, the theme song of 1972 Winter Olympics, was erected.

== Overview ==
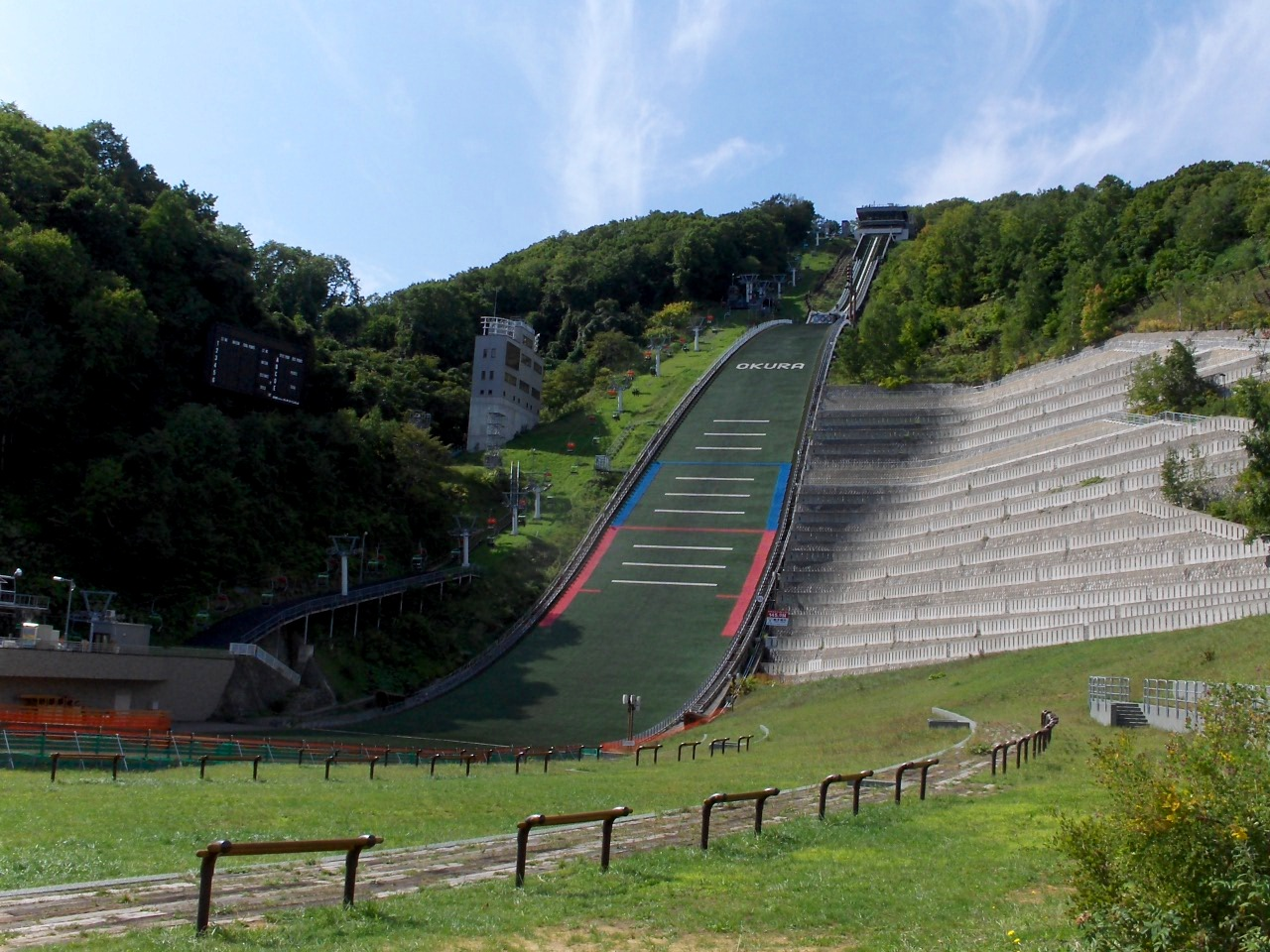
The ski jump in the stadium. The blue line is P-spot, and red line indicates K-spot.

The Mt. Okura Ski Jump Stadium is one of the venues of the FIS Nordic World Ski Championships, and also one of the few 90 metre class jumping hills throughout the world. The maximum inclination of the Approach Slope, the area from the starting point to the take-off ramp with 101 metres, is 35 degrees, and the Landing Slope, the area drew lines of P-spot and K-spot, is 37 degrees. The P-spot was displayed by the blue line on the slope, which indicates the standard points for landing of ski jumping, while the K-spot is partitioned by the red line, and is designated as the area which gives ski jumpers additional points in the case of successful landing.

Visitors must use the moving staircase from the parking lot to the place where the stadium is located. The Ōkurayama Crystal House, a building which houses a souvenir shop and a restaurant, is located near the entrance, and the Winter Sports Museum is located in the other side. The construction of the museum was completed in December 1999, and opened to the public on April 22, 2000. It has 3 stories, and exhibits a number of materials related to the history of skiing, instruments, and media contents. To reach at the Mt. Okura Observation Platform located on the top of the ski jump, it is required to buy tickets to ride the lift toward the Observation Platform at the shop in front of the Ōkurayama Crystal House. Another route, a trail leading to the platform on the side of the ski jump, is also available. The places for observation are located both in the second and third floor, and visitors enjoy the view of the entire ski jump and Sapporo city from a height of 300 metres.

== Hill record ==
Unofficial or absolute records are all jumps that were at that time longer than official records but set in a lower circuit competitions such as continental cup, nationals etc., not actually counting.

=== Official ===
Date		Metres	Feet
1932	(Japan) Kenji Hama	34.0	112
1932	(Japan) Shiro Yamada	44.5	146
1932	(Japan) Shunji Tatta	47.0	154
1932	(Japan) Kenji Hama	48.0	157
1932	(Japan) Kinya Kojima	49.5	162
1932	(Japan) Shigetada Matsuyama	51.5	169
1933	(Japan) Takeo Asagi	56.0	184
1934	(Japan) Shunji Tatta	61.5	202
1934	(Japan) Masaji Iguro	67.0	220
1937	(Japan) Noboru Hoshino	70.0	230
1938	(Japan) Gor Adachi	70.0	230
1939	(Japan) Fumio Asagi	79.0	259
1952	(Japan) Shibono Hiroaki	84.0	276
1955	(Japan) Hiroji Yoshizawa	86.5	284
1956	(Japan) Sadao Kikuchi	87.0	285
1957	(Japan) Koichi Sato	90.0	295
1957	(Japan) Sadao Kikuchi	91.0	299
1958	(Japan) Koichi Sato	92.0	302
1961	(Japan) Takashi Matsui	94.0	308
1962	(Japan) Sadao Kikuchi	94.0	308
1963	(Japan) Sadao Kikuchi	102.0	308
1964	(Japan) Sadao Kikuchi	103.5	340
1969	(Czechoslovakia) Josef Matouš	104.0	341

Date		Metres	Feet
11 February 1972	(Poland) Wojciech Fortuna	111.0	364
12 January 1980	(Socialist Federal Republic of Yugoslavia) Bogdan Norčič	113.0	371
12 January 1980	(Japan) Hirokazu Yagi	113.5	371
12 January 1980	(Japan) Masahiro Akimoto	114.0	374
22 January 1984	(Austria) Manfred Steiner	114.0	374
26 January 1986	(Finland) Matti Nykänen	120.0	394
25 January 1987	(Socialist Federal Republic of Yugoslavia) Primož Ulaga	121.0	397
15 December 1991	(Austria) Werner Rathmayr	122.0	400
20 December 1992	(Japan) Akira Higashi	122.0	400
23 January 1994	(Germany) Jens Weißflog	125.0	410
19 January 1997	(Norway) Roar Ljøkelsøy	126.0	413
19 January 1997	(Japan) Takanobu Okabe	129.0	423
19 January 1997	(Germany) Dieter Thoma	134.5	441
23 January 1999	(Germany) Dieter Thoma	135.5	445
24 January 1999	(Germany) Martin Schmitt	139.0	456
25 January 2003	(Austria) Florian Liegl	139.0	456
6 February 2005	(Finland) Risto Jussilainen	139.0	456
22 January 2006	(Norway) Roar Ljøkelsøy	140.0	459
26 January 2014	(Austria) Andreas Kofler	140.0	459
25 January 2015	(Poland) Kamil Stoch	140.0	459
29 January 2016	(Slovenia) Domen Prevc	141.0	463
31 January 2016	(Japan) Daiki Itō	141.5	464
31 January 2016	(Norway) Anders Fannemel	143.5	471
12 February 2017	(Poland) Maciej Kot	144.0	472
12 February 2017	(Austria) Stefan Kraft	144.0	472
26 January 2019	(Poland) Kamil Stoch	148.5	487

=== Unofficial ===
Date		Metres	Feet
7 January 1971	(Japan) Yukio Kasaya	112.5	369
20 March 1971	(Japan) Akitsugo Konno	114.5	376
13 January 1974	(Japan) Yukio Kasaya	115.0	377
16 January 1977	(Switzerland) Walter Steiner	115.5	379
15 January 1978	(Norway) Bjarne Næs	118.0	387
7 March 1982	(Japan) Hirokazu Yagi	119.0	390
16 February 1985	(Japan) Masahiro Akimoto	122.5	402
14 January 1990	(Finland) Anssi Nieminen	123.5	405
11 January 1992	(Japan) Masahiko Harada	123.5	405
7 March 1992	(Japan) Jinya Nishikata	123.5	405
24 January 1993	(Japan) Kenji Suda	124.5	408
29 January 1994	(Japan) Noriaki Kasai	127.0	417
30 January 1994	(Japan) Noriaki Kasai	135.0	443
9 March 1997	(Austria) Falko Krismayr	138.0	453
1 February 1998	(Japan) Takanobu Okabe	138.5	454
1 February 1998	(Japan) Masahiko Harada	140.5	461
13 January 2002	(Japan) Masahiko Harada	141.0	463
25 March 2005	(Japan) Yūsuke Kaneko	145.0	476
11 January 2010	(Japan) Noriaki Kasai	145.0	476
21 January 2012	(Japan) Taku Takeuchi	145.5	477
21 January 2012	(Japan) Daiki Itō	146.0	479
18 January 2015	(Slovenia) Anže Lanišek	146.5	481

== Access ==
- JR Bus: 12 minutes from Maruyama Bus Terminal (Maruyama-Kōen Station, Tōzai Line) to Okurayama Kyogijo Iriguchi Bus stop, plus 10 minutes walking distance.
