= Tapio Räisänen =

Finnish ski jumper

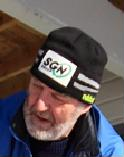

Medal record

Men's ski jumping

Representing Finland

World Championships
Gold medal – first place	1978 Lahti	Individual large hill

Tapio Räisänen (born 10 May 1949) is a Finnish former ski jumper who competed in the late 1970s. He was born in Taivalkoski.

Räisänen won a gold medal in the individual large hill competition at the 1978 FIS Nordic World Ski Championships in Lahti and finished 6th in the normal hill at those same championships. Ski flying-WM 1977 in Vikersund 7th.

Räisänen's best non-world championship career finish was 9th in a normal hill event at Bischofshofen, Austria in 1979, and 1st in Japan, Sapporo large hill 1980.

In 2012, the Finnish Minister for Education and the Ministry of Culture created the Tapio Räisänen Pro Sports Recognition Award worth 20,000 euros.
