= Dirk Kramer =

German Nordic combined skier

Personal information
- Nationality: German
- Born: 11 April 1960 (age 64); Korbach, West Germany

Sport
- Sport: Nordic combined

Dirk Kramer (born 11 April 1960) is a German former skier. He competed in the Nordic combined event at the 1984 Winter Olympics.
