= Jim Maki =

American ski jumper

James Clifford Maki (born July 7, 1950) is an American former ski jumper who competed in the 1976 Winter Olympics and in the 1980 Winter Olympics. He was born in Grand Rapids, Minnesota.
