= Seppo Reijonen =

Finnish ski jumper (1944–2026)

Personal information
- Nationality: Finnish
- Born: 29 April 1944 Sortavala, (Note: Sortavala was at that time occupied by Finland due to the Continuation War.), Karelo-Finnish SSR, Soviet Union
- Died: 14 January 2026 (aged 81)

Sport
- Sport: Ski jumping

Seppo Reijonen (29 April 1944 – 14 January 2026) was a Finnish ski jumper. He competed in the large hill event at the 1968 Winter Olympics. Reijonen later moved to Sweden, and he also represented Sweden in competitions. Reijonen died on 14 January 2026, at the age of 81.
