= Hirokazu Yagi =

Japanese ski jumper

Hirokazu Yagi 八木 弘和
Personal information
- Full name: 八木 弘和
- Nationality: Japan
- Born: 26 December 1959 (age 66) Otaru, Hokkaido, Japan
- Height: 167 cm (5 ft 6 in)

Sport
- Sport: Skiing

World Cup career
- Seasons: 1980–1984
- Indiv. starts: 26
- Indiv. podiums: 3
- Indiv. wins: 1
Medal record
Men's ski jumping
Olympic Games
| Silver medal – second place | 1980 Lake Placid | Normal hill individual |
World Championships
| Silver medal – second place | 1980 Lake Placid | Normal hill individual |
- Updated on 10 February 2016

Hirokazu Yagi (八木 弘和, Yagi Hirokazu) (born 26 December 1959) is a Japanese former ski jumper.

== Career ==
His best finish was a silver medal in the Individual Normal Hill at the 1980 Winter Olympics in Lake Placid, New York, (Tied with Manfred Deckert of East Germany).

== World Cup ==
=== Standings ===
| Season | Overall | 4H |
|---|---|---|
| 1979/80 | 4 | 17 |
| 1980/81 | 56 | 14 |
| 1981/82 | 55 | 95 |
| 1982/83 | — | 72 |
| 1983/84 | 69 | — |

=== Wins ===
| No. | Season | Date | Location | Hill | Size |
|---|---|---|---|---|---|
| 1 | 1979/80 | 12 January 1980 | (Japan) Sapporo | Ōkurayama K110 | LH |
