= Hubert Neuper =

Austrian ski jumper (born 1960)

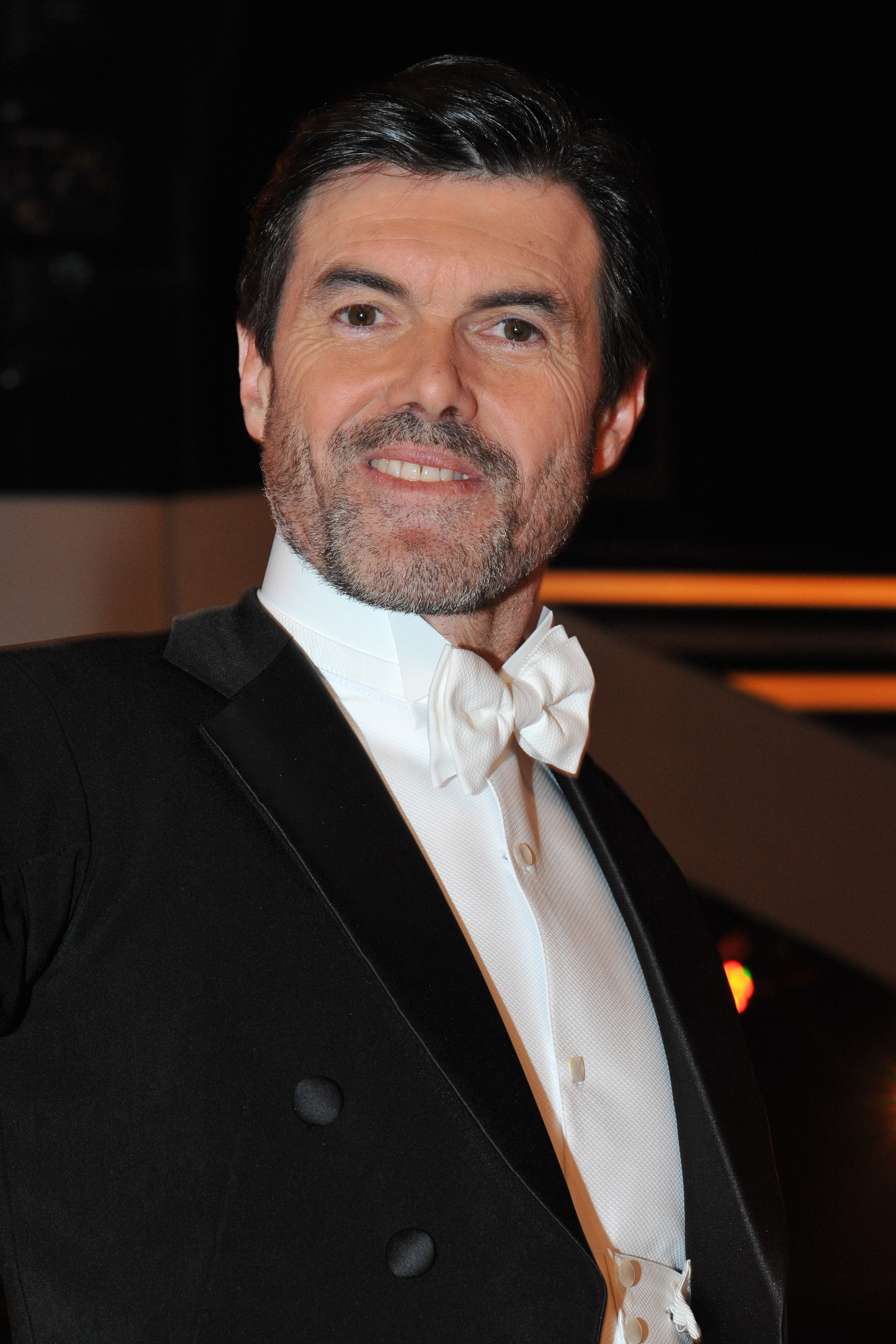

Personal information
- Nationality: Austria
- Born: 29 September 1960 (age 65) Bad Aussee, Austria
- Height: 176 cm (5 ft 9 in)

Sport
- Sport: Skiing

World Cup career
- Seasons: 1980–1985
- Indiv. starts: 65
- Indiv. podiums: 23
- Indiv. wins: 8
- Overall titles: 1 (1980)
- Four Hills titles: 2 (1980, 1981)
Medal record
Men's ski jumping
Olympic Games
Silver medal – second place	1980 Lake Placid	Individual LH
World Championships
Silver medal – second place	1980 Lake Placid	Individual LH
Silver medal – second place	1982 Oslo	Team LH
- Updated on 10 February 2016

Hubert Neuper (born 29 September 1960) is an Austrian former ski jumper. He was the winner of the first FIS Ski Jumping World Cup title in 1979/80.

== Career ==
Neuper's best known success was at the 1980 Winter Olympics in Lake Placid, New York, where he won a silver medal in the individual large hill event. Neuper also earned a silver in the team large hill competition at the 1982 FIS Nordic World Ski Championships in Oslo. He runs a ski school in Bad Mitterndorf in Austria.

== World Cup ==
=== Standings ===
Season	Overall	4H
1979/80	1st place, gold medalist(s)	1st place, gold medalist(s)
1980/81	4	1st place, gold medalist(s)
1981/82	2nd place, silver medalist(s)	5
1982/83	31	26
1983/84	69	32
1984/85	—	83

=== Wins ===
No.	Season	Date	Location	Hill	Size
1	1979/80	1 January 1980	(West Germany) Garmisch-Pa	Große Olympiaschanze K107	LH
2	1979/80	4 January 1980	(Austria) Innsbruck	Bergiselschanze K104	LH
3	1979/80	22 March 1980	(Socialist Federal Republic of Yugoslavia) Planica	Bloudkova velikanka K120	LH
4	1980/81	30 December 1980	(West Germany) Oberstdorf	Schattenbergschanze K110	LH
5	1980/81	21 January 1981	(Switzerland) St. Moritz	Olympiaschanze K94	NH
6	1981/82	6 January 1982	(Austria) Bischofshofen	Paul-Ausserleitner-Schanze K109	LH
7	1981/82	13 March 1982	(Austria) Bad Mitterndorf	Kulm K165	FH
8	1981/82	14 March 1982	(Austria) Bad Mitterndorf	Kulm K165	FH
