= Hiroyasu Aizawa =

Japanese former ski jumper

Personal information
- Born: 1 March 1961 (age 65) Hokkaidō, Japan

Sport
- Sport: Skiing

World Cup career
- Seasons: 1979–1980
- Indiv. podiums: 0
- Indiv. wins: 0

Hiroyasu Aizawa (born 1 March 1961) is a Japanese former ski jumper. In the World Cup his highest place was thirteenth in December 1979 in Cortina d'Ampezzo. He also won a bronze medal at the 1979 World Junior Championships and competed at the 1980 Winter Olympics.
