= Roger Ruud =

Norwegian former ski jumper (born 1958)

Personal information
- Nationality: Norway
- Born: 1 October 1958 (age 67) Hurdal, Norway
- Height: 175 cm (5 ft 9 in)

Sport
- Sport: Skiing

World Cup career
- Seasons: 1980–1986
- Indiv. starts: 61
- Indiv. podiums: 16
- Indiv. wins: 9
- Updated on 10 February 2016

Roger Ruud (born 1 October 1958) is a Norwegian former ski jumper.

== Career ==
He won the 1982 New Year's competition in Garmisch-Partenkirchen and finished second overall in the Four Hills Tournament that same year. He won the Holmenkollen ski jump competition in 1981.

Ruud was Norwegian champion in the large hill (1981) and twice in the normal hill (1982 and 1986). He was also Norwegian junior champion from 1975 to 1978. He also won three Norwegian Championships in Road racing.

Ruud finished 6th in the large hill and 13th in the normal hill at the 1980 Winter Olympics in Lake Placid, New York. He had nine additional World Cup career victories from 1980 to 1985.

In 2009, he has spent 30 days in prison for speeding.

== World Cup ==
=== Standings ===
Season	Overall	4H
1979/80	26	21
1980/81	2nd place, silver medalist(s)	4
1981/82	8	2nd place, silver medalist(s)
1982/83	20	22
1983/84	45	18
1984/85	23	32
1985/86	68	—

=== Wins ===
No.	Season	Date	Location	Hill	Size
1	1979/80	27 February 1980	(Switzerland) St. Moritz	Olympiaschanze K94	NH
2	1980/81	10 January 1981	(Czechoslovakia) Harrachov	Čerťák K120	LH
3	1980/81	11 January 1981	(Czechoslovakia) Liberec	Ještěd B K88	NH
4	1980/81	26 February 1981	(France) Chamonix	Le Mont K95	NH
5	1980/81	28 February 1981	(France) St. Nizier	Dauphine K112	LH
6	1980/81	15 March 1981	(Norway) Oslo	Holmenkollbakken K105	LH
7	1981/82	20 December 1981	(Italy) Cortina d’Ampezzo	Trampolino Italia K92	NH
8	1981/82	1 January 1982	(West Germany) Garmisch-Partenkirchen	Große Olympiaschanze K107	LH
9	1984/85	8 January 1985	(Italy) Cortina d’Ampezzo	Trampolino Italia K92	NH
