= Toni Innauer =

Austrian ski jumper (born 1958)

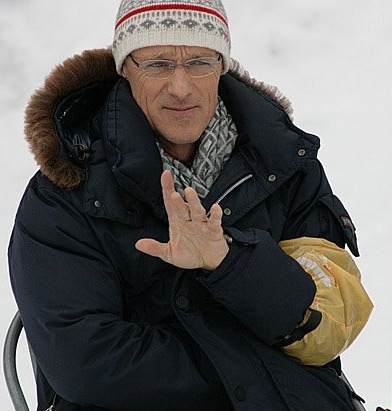

Personal information
- Nationality: Austria
- Born: 1 April 1958 (age 68) Bezau, Austria
- Height: 1.73 m (5 ft 8 in)

Sport
- Sport: Skiing

World Cup career
- Seasons: 1980
- Indiv. starts: 10
- Indiv. podiums: 3
- Indiv. wins: 2

Achievements and titles
- Personal bests: 176 m (577 ft); Oberstdorf, 7 March 1976
Medal record
Men's ski jumping
Olympic Games
Silver medal – second place	1976 Innsbruck	Individual LH
Gold medal – first place	1980 Lake Placid	Individual NH
World Championships
Silver medal – second place	1976 Innsbruck	Individual LH
Gold medal – first place	1980 Lake Placid	Individual NH
Men's ski flying
FIS Ski Flying World Championships
Silver medal – second place	1977 Vikersund	Individual
- Updated on 10 February 2016

Anton Innauer (born 1 April 1958) is an Austrian former ski jumper.

== Career ==
His best-known success was at the 1980 Winter Olympics in Lake Placid, New York, where he won a gold medal in the individual normal hill event. Innauer also won a silver medal in the individual large hill at the 1976 Winter Olympics in Innsbruck and the ski jumping event at the Holmenkollen ski festival in 1975. He also won the silver medal at the Ski flying World Championships in Vikersund in 1977.

On 5 March 1976, he set the ski jumping world record distance at 174 metres (571 ft). And again two days later improved world record at 176 metres (577 ft), both of them set in Oberstdorf, West Germany.

Innauer retired from competitions in 1980 due to an ankle injury. In 1987, he graduated from the University of Graz with a degree in philosophy, psychology, and sports science. His thesis was on the sociology of ski jumping. Between 1987 and 1989, he was a ski jumper and ski jumping coach. In 1989–1992 and 2001/02, he trained the Austrian ski jumping team. In 1993–2001 and since 2002, he has been director of Nordic skiing in the Austrian Ski Federation (ÖSV). He is also the ski jumping expert for German TV channel ZDF.

At a 1976 (March 5–7) ski jumping event in Oberstdorf, Germany, Innauer became the first person to achieve perfect marks from all five judges (20 points maximum). This mark has been matched by only five others since: Kazuyoshi Funaki at the 1998 Winter Olympics in Nagano, Sven Hannawald and Hideharu Miyahira at the same 2003 World Cup competition in Willingen, Germany, Wolfgang Loitzl at Bischofshofen, Austria in 2009 during the 2008/09 Four Hills Tournament. and Peter Prevc in 2015 World Cup competition in Planica

== World Cup ==
=== Standings ===
Season	Overall	4H
1979/80	9	35

=== Wins ===
No.	Season	Date	Location	Hill	Size
1	1979/80	27 December 1979	(Italy) Cortina d'Ampezzo	Trampolino Italia K92	NH
2	1979/80	2 March 1980	(Switzerland) Engelberg	Gross-Titlis-Schanze K116	LH

== Ski jumping world records ==
Date	Hill	Location	Metres	Feet
5 March 1976	Heini-Klopfer-Skiflugschanze K175	Oberstdorf, West Germany	174	571
7 March 1976	Heini-Klopfer-Skiflugschanze K175	Oberstdorf, West Germany	176	577
