= Jeff Davis (ski jumper) =

American former ski jumper (born 1958)

Jeff Davis (born March 19, 1958) is an American former ski jumper who competed in the 1980 Winter Olympics.
