= Vladimir Vlasov (ski jumper) =

Soviet ski jumper

Personal information
- Nationality: Soviet
- Born: 6 July 1958 (age 66)

Sport
- Sport: Ski jumping

Vladimir Vlasov (born 6 July 1958) is a Soviet ski jumper. He competed in the normal hill and large hill events at the 1980 Winter Olympics.
