= Ján Tánczos =

Slovak ski jumper (born 1954)

Sport
- Sport: Skiing

World Cup career
- Seasons: 1980; 1982–1983
- Indiv. podiums: 1
- Updated on 30 March 2015

Ján Tánczos (born 23 November 1954) is a Slovak former ski jumper who represented Czechoslovakia. After he ended his active career, he became a ski jumper coach.
