= Hans Millonig =

Austrian ski jumper

Personal information
- Nationality: Austria
- Born: 11 May 1952 (age 74) Villach, Austria
- Height: 1.79 m (5 ft 10 1/2 in)

Sport
- Sport: Skiing

World Cup career
- Seasons: 1980–1981
- Indiv. starts: 17
- Indiv. podiums: 3
- Indiv. wins: 1
- Updated on 10 February 2016

Hans Millonig (born 11 May 1952) is an Austrian former ski jumper.

== World Cup ==
=== Standings ===
Season	Overall	4H
1979/80	6	22
1980/81	—	22

=== Wins ===
No.	Season	Date	Location	Hill	Size
1	1979/80	21 March 1980	(Socialist Federal Republic of Yugoslavia) Planica	Srednja Bloudkova K90	NH
