= Claus Tuchscherer =

East German Nordic combined skier

Claus Tuchscherer (born 14 January 1955 in Rodewisch, East Germany) is an East German Nordic combined skier (until 1976) and then Austrian ski jumper. He finished fifth in the Nordic combined event at the 1976 Winter Olympics in Innsbruck. On the last day of the event he fled with his Austrian girlfriend to Bischofshofen.
