= Stanisław Bobak =

Polish ski jumper

Personal information
- Nationality: Poland
- Born: 12 March 1956 Ząb, Poland
- Died: 12 November 2010 (aged 54) Zakopane, Poland
- Height: 1.69 m (5 ft 6 1/2 in)

Sport
- Sport: Skiing

World Cup career
- Seasons: 1980–1981
- Indiv. starts: 21
- Indiv. podiums: 4
- Indiv. wins: 1

Achievements and titles
- Personal bests: 153 m (502 ft); Oberstdorf, 27 February 1981
- Updated on 10 February 2016

Stanisław Bobak (12 March 1956 – 12 November 2010) was a Polish ski jumper.

== Career ==
Bobak was born in Ząb. Stanisław Bobak was one of the leading ski jumpers of the 1970s and 1980s, and was a member of the Polish team at the 1976 Winter Olympics and 1980 Winter Olympics. He died in Zakopane.

== World Cup ==
=== Standings ===
Season	Overall	4H
1979/80	3rd place, bronze medalist(s)	36
1980/81	52	21

=== Wins ===
No.	Season	Date	Location	Hill	Size
1	1979/80	26 January 1980	(Poland) Zakopane	Średnia Krokiew K82	NH
