= Jouko Törmänen =

Finnish ski jumper

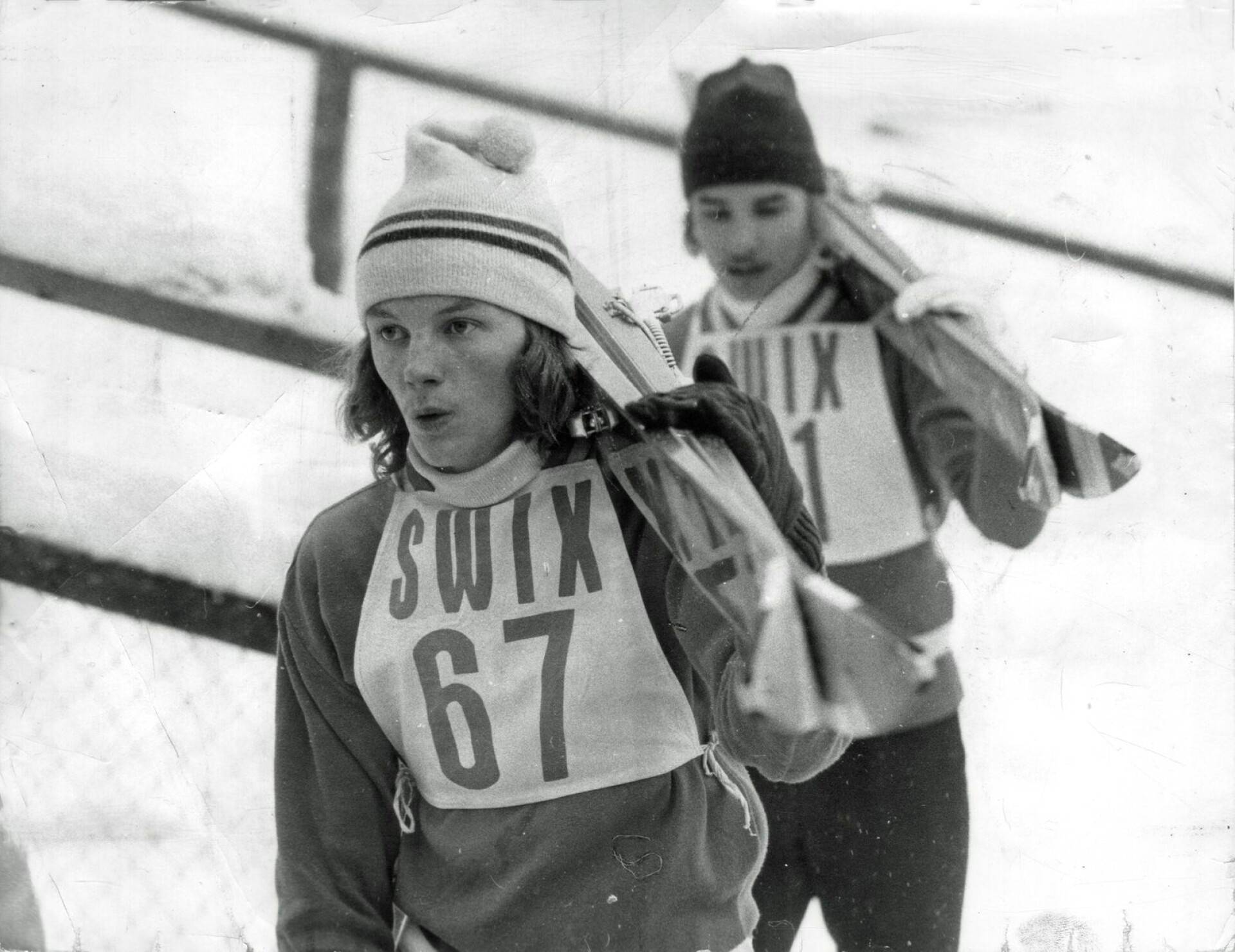

Personal information
- Full name: Jouko Sihveri Törmänen
- Nationality: Finland
- Born: 10 April 1954 Rovaniemi, Finland
- Died: 3 January 2015 (aged 60) Rovaniemi, Finland
- Height: 173 cm (5 ft 8 in)

Sport
- Sport: Skiing

World Cup career
- Seasons: 1980–1982
- Indiv. starts: 20
- Indiv. podiums: 3
- Indiv. wins: 1
Medal record
Men's ski jumping
Olympic Games
Gold medal – first place	1980 Lake Placid	Individual LH
World Championships
Gold medal – first place	1980 Lake Placid	Individual LH
- Updated on 10 February 2016

Jouko Sihveri Törmänen (10 April 1954 – 3 January 2015) was a Finnish ski jumper.

== Career ==
His best-known success was at the 1980 Winter Olympics in Lake Placid, New York, where he won a gold medal in the individual large hill event.

== World Cup ==
=== Standings ===
Season	Overall	4H
1979/80	19	19
1980/81	36	38
1981/82	—	51

=== Wins ===
No.	Season	Date	Location	Hill	Size
1	1979/80	11 March 1980	(Sweden) Falun	Lugnet K89	NH
