= Bernard Moullier =

French former ski jumper (born 1957)

Bernard Moullier (born 27 September 1957) is a French former ski jumper. Moullier competed at the 1980 Winter Olympics.
