= Jari Puikkonen =

Finnish ski jumper (born 1959)

Personal information
- Full name: Jari Markus Puikkonen
- Nationality: Finland
- Born: 25 June 1959 (age 67) Lahti, Finland
- Height: 180 cm (5 ft 11 in)

Sport
- Sport: Skiing

World Cup career
- Seasons: 1980–1991
- Indiv. starts: 106
- Indiv. podiums: 19
- Indiv. wins: 5
Medal record
Men's ski jumping
Olympic Games
Gold medal – first place	1988 Calgary	Team LH
Bronze medal – third place	1980 Lake Placid	Individual LH
Bronze medal – third place	1984 Sarajevo	Individual NH
World Championships
Gold medal – first place	1984 Engelberg	Team LH
Gold medal – first place	1985 Seefeld	Team LH
Gold medal – first place	1989 Lahti	Individual LH
Gold medal – first place	1989 Lahti	Team LH
Silver medal – second place	1982 Oslo	Individual NH
Silver medal – second place	1985 Seefeld	Individual LH
Bronze medal – third place	1980 Lake Placid	Individual LH
Bronze medal – third place	1982 Oslo	Team LH
Men's ski flying
FIS Ski Flying World Championships
Gold medal – first place	1981 Oberstdorf	Individual
- Updated on 10 February 2016

Jari Markus Puikkonen (born 25 June 1959) is a Finnish former ski jumper.

== Career ==
Puikkonen made his debut internationally in the Four Hills Tournament competition in Oberstdorf on 30 December 1977. He won his first World Cup victory at Innsbruck in 1981. That year he finished third overall in the Four Hills Tournament and he won three more victories in the ski jumping World Cup to finish fifth overall. He also won three medals at the Winter Olympics with a gold in the team large lill (1988 Winter Olympics), and bronze medals in both the individual normal hill (1984 Winter Olympics) and the individual large hill (1980 Winter Olympics).

Puikkonen's biggest successes were at the FIS Nordic World Ski Championships, where he won seven medals, including four golds (individual large hill: 1989, team large hill: 1984, 1985, 1989), two silvers (individual normal hill: 1982, individual large hill: 1985), and one bronze (team large hill: 1982). He also won a gold medal at the FIS Ski-Flying World Championships 1981.

Puikkonen retired after the 1990/91 season.

== World Cup ==
=== Standings ===
Season	Overall	4H	SF
1979/80	10	27	N/A
1980/81	5	3rd place, bronze medalist(s)	N/A
1981/82	26	21	N/A
1982/83	10	11	N/A
1983/84	9	4	N/A
1984/85	6	24	N/A
1985/86	14	3rd place, bronze medalist(s)	N/A
1986/87	49	15	N/A
1987/88	20	10	N/A
1988/89	18	12	N/A
1989/90	37	27	N/A
1990/91	—	43	—

=== Wins ===
No.	Season	Date	Location	Hill	Size
1	1980/81	4 January 1981	(Austria) Innsbruck	Bergiselschanze K104	LH
2	1980/81	6 March 1981	(Finland) Lahti	Salpausselkä K88	NH
3	1980/81	7 March 1981	(Finland) Lahti	Salpausselkä K113	LH
4	1980/81	21 March 1981	(Socialist Federal Republic of Yugoslavia) Planica	Srednja Bloudkova K90	NH
5	1985/86	4 January 1986	(Austria) Innsbruck	Bergiselschanze K109	LH
