= Hansjörg Sumi =

Swiss former ski jumper (born 1959)

Personal information
- Nationality: Switzerland
- Born: 19 January 1959 (age 67) Saanen, Switzerland
- Height: 1.64 m (5 ft 4 1/2 in)

Sport
- Sport: Skiing

World Cup career
- Seasons: 1980–1984
- Indiv. starts: 38*
- Indiv. podiums: 5
- Indiv. wins: 1
- Updated on 10 February 2016

Hansjörg Sumi (born 19 January 1959) is a Swiss former ski jumper.

== Career ==
He finished seventh in the individual large hill event at the 1980 Winter Olympics in Lake Placid, New York. Sumi's only career victory was in an individual large hill event in Switzerland in 1980.

== World Cup ==
=== Standings ===
Season	Overall	4H
1979/80	8	11
1980/81	61	32
1981/82	33	25
1982/83	22	31
1983/84	32	31

=== Wins ===
No.	Season	Date	Location	Hill	Size
1	1979/80	29 February 1980	(Switzerland) Gstaad	Mattenschanze K88	NH
