= Per Bergerud =

Norwegian ski jumper

Personal information
- Nationality: Norway
- Born: 28 June 1956 (age 70) Flesberg, Norway
- Height: 1.83 m (6 ft 0 in)

Sport
- Sport: Skiing

World Cup career
- Seasons: 1980–1985
- Indiv. starts: 82
- Indiv. podiums: 15
- Indiv. wins: 4
Medal record
Men's ski jumping
FIS Nordic World Ski Championships
Gold medal – first place	1982 Oslo	Team LH
Gold medal – first place	1985 Seefeld	Individual LH
Bronze medal – third place	1985 Seefeld	Individual NH
- Updated on 10 February 2016

Per Bergerud (born 28 June 1956) is a Norwegian former ski jumper.

== Career ==
At the 1982 FIS Nordic World Ski Championships in Oslo, he won a gold medal in the team large hill event. Bergerud reached the peak of his career at the 1985 FIS Nordic World Ski Championships in Seefeld, he won a gold medal in the individual large hill and a bronze medal in the individual normal hill.

Bergerud also won the ski jumping competition at the Holmenkollen ski festival in 1979. He earned the Holmenkollen medal in 1985 (shared with Anette Bøe and Gunde Svan). During his career, Bergerud won eight individual ski jumping national championships.

== World Cup ==
=== Standings ===
Season	Overall	4H
1979/80	17	33
1980/81	8	5
1981/82	6	3rd place, bronze medalist(s)
1982/83	5	4
1983/84	12	6
1984/85	9	13

=== Wins ===
No.	Season	Date	Location	Hill	Size
1	1979/80	29 February 1980 (canceled) 1 March 1980; 2 March 1980	(Norway) Vikersund	Vikersundbakken K155	FH
2	1980/81	25 January 1981	(Switzerland) Engelberg	Gross-Titlis-Schanze K116	LH
3	1981/82	3 January 1982	(Austria) Innsbruck	Bergiselschanze K104	LH
4	1982/83	30 January 1983	(Switzerland) Engelberg	Gross-Titlis-Schanze K116	LH
