= Jochen Danneberg =

East German ski jumper

Personal information
- Nationality: East Germany
- Born: 9 April 1953 (age 73) Halberstadt, East Germany
- Height: 180 cm (5 ft 11 in)

Sport
- Sport: Skiing

World Cup career
- Seasons: 1980
- Indiv. starts: 4
- Indiv. podiums: 1
- Indiv. wins: 1
- Four Hills titles: 2 (1976, 1977)
Medal record
Men's ski jumping
Olympic Games
Silver medal – second place	1976 Innsbruck	Individual NH
World Championships
Silver medal – second place	1976 Innsbruck	Individual NH
- Updated on 10 February 2016

Jochen Danneberg (born 9 April 1953) is an East German former ski jumper.

== Career ==
Danneberg's best finish was a silver medal in the individual normal hill at the 1976 Winter Olympics in Innsbruck. He also won the Four Hills Tournament twice, in 1976 and 1977. For many years he has been the main trainer for the South Korean national ski jumping team.

== World Cup ==
=== Standings ===
Season	Overall	4H
1979/80	33	7

=== Wins ===
No.	Season	Date	Location	Hill	Size
1	1979/80	30 December 1979	(West Germany) Oberstdorf	Schattenbergschanze K110	LH

== Invalid ski jumping world record ==
Date	Hill	Location	Metres	Feet
8 March 1973	Heini-Klopfer-Skiflugschanze K175	Oberstdorf, West Germany	166	545

Not recognized! Crashed at world record distance.
