= Ivar Mobekk =

Norwegian ski jumper (born 1959)

Ivar Mobekk (born 15 September 1959 in Elverum) is a Norwegian former ski jumper who competed at the 1980 Winter Olympics.
