= Robert Mösching =

Swiss ski jumper

Personal information
- Full name: Robert Mösching
- Born: 23 November 1954 (age 71)

Sport
- Sport: Skiing

World Cup career
- Seasons: 1980
- Indiv. podiums: 1
- Updated on 30 Mar 2015

Robert Mösching (born 23 November 1954) is a Swiss former ski jumper. He competed at the 1976 Winter Olympics and the 1980 Winter Olympics.
