= Alfred Groyer =

Austrian ski jumper (born 1959)

Alfred Groyer (born 8 January 1959 in Villach) is an Austrian former ski jumper who competed from 1978 to 1984. He finished seventh in the individual normal hill event at the 1980 Winter Olympics in Lake Placid, New York.

Groyer's best career finish was third four times from 1979 to 1982.
