= Martin Weber (ski jumper) =

East German ski jumper

Personal information
- Nationality: East Germany
- Born: 15 April 1954 (age 72) Pappenheim, East Germany
- Height: 1.73 m (5 ft 8 in)

Sport
- Sport: Skiing

World Cup career
- Seasons: 1980
- Indiv. starts: 4
- Indiv. podiums: 1
- Indiv. wins: 1
- Updated on 10 February 2016

Martin Weber (born 15 April 1954) is an East German former ski jumper.

== Career ==
In the World Cup he finished thrice among the top 10, his best result being a victory from Bischofshofen in the Four Hills Tournament in January 1980. He competed only on four world cup competitions in his career and that was at the 1979-80 Four Hills Tournament where he finished third overall.

== World Cup ==
=== Standings ===
Season	Overall	4H
1979/80	29	3rd place, bronze medalist(s)

=== Wins ===
No.	Season	Date	Location	Hill	Size
1	1979/80	6 January 1980	(Austria) Bischofshofen	Paul-Ausserleitner-Schanze K109	LH
