= Saint-Nizier-du-Moucherotte =

- Commune
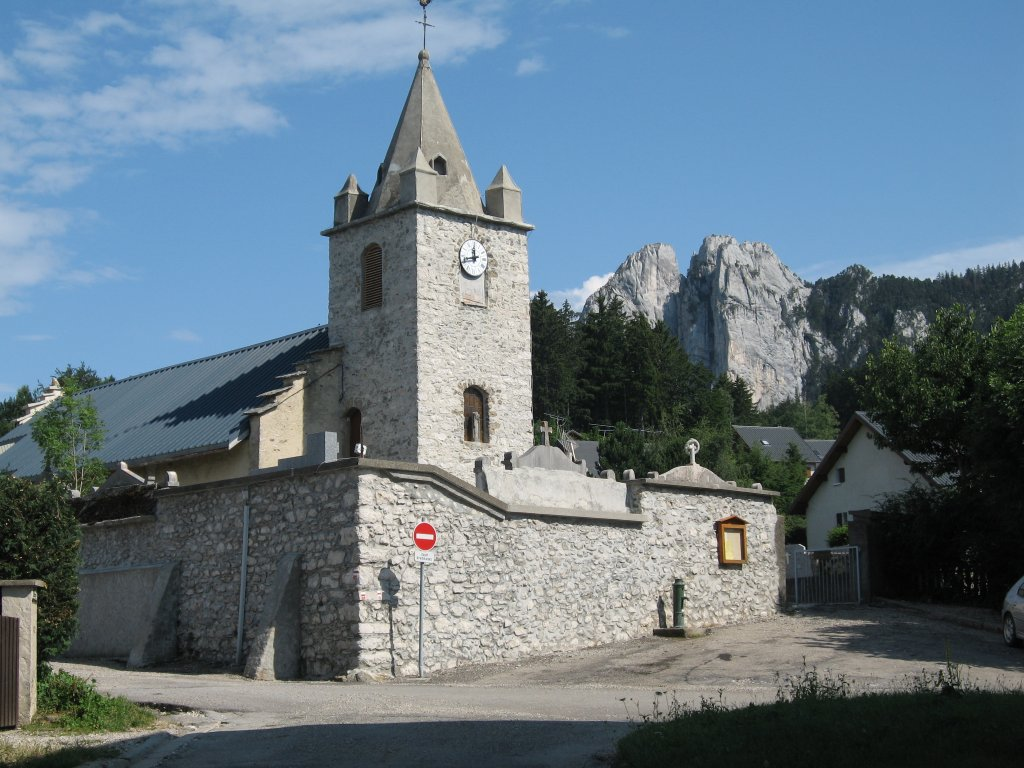
- The church of Saint-Nizier-du-Moucherotte
- Location of Saint-Nizier-du-Moucherotte
- Location within France Location within Auvergne-Rhône-Alpes
- Coordinates: 45°10′19″N 5°37′52″E
- Country: France
- Region: Auvergne-Rhône-Alpes
- Department: Isère
- Arrondissement: Grenoble
- Canton: Fontaine-Vercors
- Intercommunality: Massif du Vercors

Government
  - Mayor (2020–2026): Franck Girard
- Area^{1}: 11 km^{2} (4.2 sq mi)
- Highest elevation: 1,897 m (6,224 ft)
- Lowest elevation: 863 m (2,831 ft)
- Population (2023): 1,162
  - Density: 110/km^{2} (270/sq mi)
- Time zone: UTC+01:00 (CET)
  - Summer (DST): UTC+02:00 (CEST)
- INSEE/Postal code: 38433 /38250
- ^{1} French Land Register data, which excludes lakes, ponds, glaciers > 1 km^{2} (0.386 sq mi or 247 acres) and river estuaries.

Saint-Nizier-du-Moucherotte (French pronunciation: [sɛ̃ nizje dy muʃʁɔt]) is a commune in the Isère department in the Auvergne-Rhône-Alpes region in Southeastern France.

== Demographics ==
Historical population
Year	Pop.	±% p.a.
1968	207	—
1975	277	+4.25%
1982	484	+8.30%
1990	575	+2.18%
1999	805	+3.81%
2007	987	+2.58%
2012	1,083	+1.87%
2017	1,098	+0.28%
2023	1,162	+0.95%
Source: INSEE

== 1968 Winter Olympics ==
The commune hosted the ski jumping individual large hill event for the 1968 Winter Olympics held in neighbouring Grenoble, on the Dauphine site on Le Moucherotte. Its hill had a calculation or K-point of 90 metres and was constructed between July 1966 and January 1967. During training, the longest jump reached was 112 metres. Final construction continued throughout the summer of 1967. During the 1968 Games, it seated 50,000 spectators.

== See also ==
- Communes of the Isère department
- Parc naturel régional du Vercors
