= Henry Glaß =

East German ski jumper

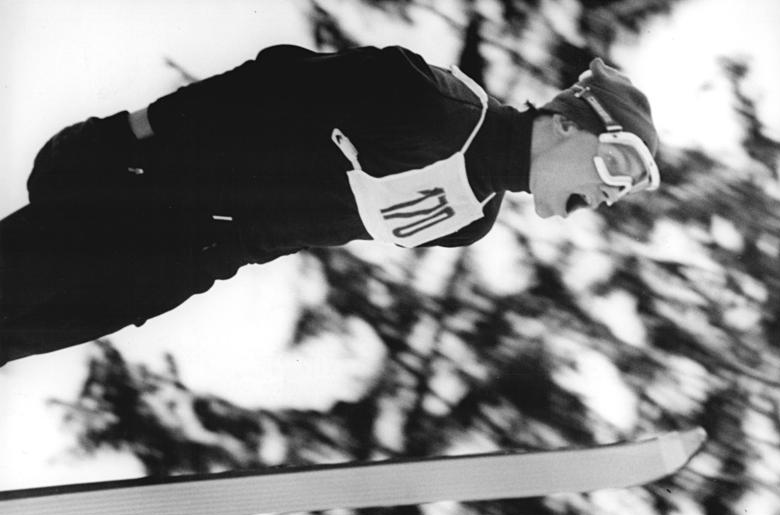
- Glaß in 1970

Medal record

Men's ski jumping

Olympic Games
Bronze medal – third place	1976 Innsbruck	Individual large hill

World Championships
Silver medal – second place	1978 Lahti	Individual normal hill
Bronze medal – third place	1976 Innsbruck	Individual large hill

Men's ski flying

World Championships
Bronze medal – third place	1977 Vikersund	Individual

Henry Glaß (born 15 February 1953 in Rodewisch) is an East German former ski jumper who competed during the 1970s.

His best-known success was at the 1976 Winter Olympics in Innsbruck, where he won a bronze medal in the individual large hill Event. Glaß also won a silver in the individual normal hill at the 1978 FIS Nordic World Ski Championships in Lahti and a bronze at the 1977 Ski-Flying World Championships in Vikersund. He was trained by Harry Glaß to whom he is unrelated.
