= Johan Sætre =

Norwegian ski jumper

Personal information
- Nationality: Norway
- Born: 5 January 1952 (age 74) Trysil, Norway
- Height: 178 cm (5 ft 10 in)

Sport
- Sport: Skiing

World Cup career
- Seasons: 1980–1983
- Indiv. starts: 43
- Indiv. podiums: 9
- Indiv. wins: 1
Medal record
Men's ski jumping
FIS Nordic World Ski Championships
| Gold medal – first place | 1982 Oslo | Team LH |
- Updated on 10 February 2016

Johan Sætre (born 5 January 1952) is a Norwegian former ski jumper.

== Career ==
An active ski jumper in the 1970s and 1980s, he won ten Norwegian ski jumping championships (Normal hill: 1974–1977, 1979, and 1980; Large hill: 1976, 1977, 1980, and 1982). He is the most-winning ski jumper of all time in the Norwegian Championships, but individual success eluded him in major international championships. At the 1982 FIS Nordic World Ski Championships in Oslo, Sætre won a gold in the team large hill competition. His best finish in an Olympic or World Cup competition was a win in 1981 at Gstaad, Switzerland.

Sætre earned the Holmenkollen medal in 1981.

== World Cup ==
=== Standings ===
| Season | Overall | 4H |
|---|---|---|
| 1979/80 | 6 | 9 |
| 1980/81 | 6 | 7 |
| 1981/82 | 9 | 14 |
| 1982/83 | 63 | — |

=== Wins ===
| No. | Season | Date | Location | Hill | Size |
|---|---|---|---|---|---|
| 1 | 1980/81 | 23 January 1981 | (Switzerland) Gstaad | Mattenschanze K88 | NH |
