= Große Olympiaschanze =

Ski jumping hill in Garmisch-Partenkirchen, Germany

Coordinates: 47°28′53″N 11°07′04″E

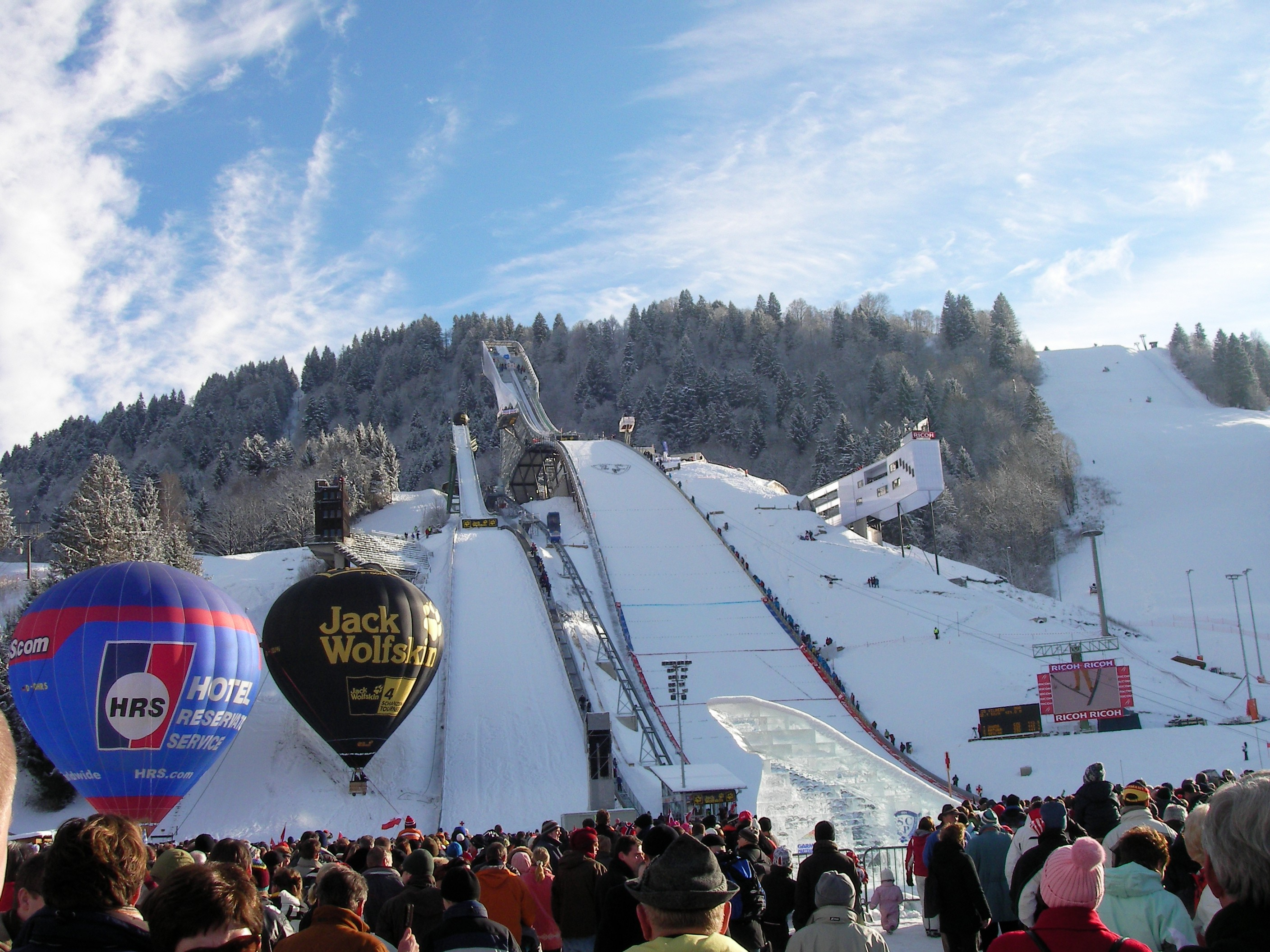
- New Year's Day 2008
- Location: Garmisch-Partenkirchen; Germany
- Opened: 1933
- Renovated: 1950, 1978, 1996, 2007

Size
- K–point: K-125
- Hill size: HS142
- Hill record: 145.5 m (475.7 ft) (Austria) Stephan Embacher (31 December 2025)

Top events
- Olympics: 1936

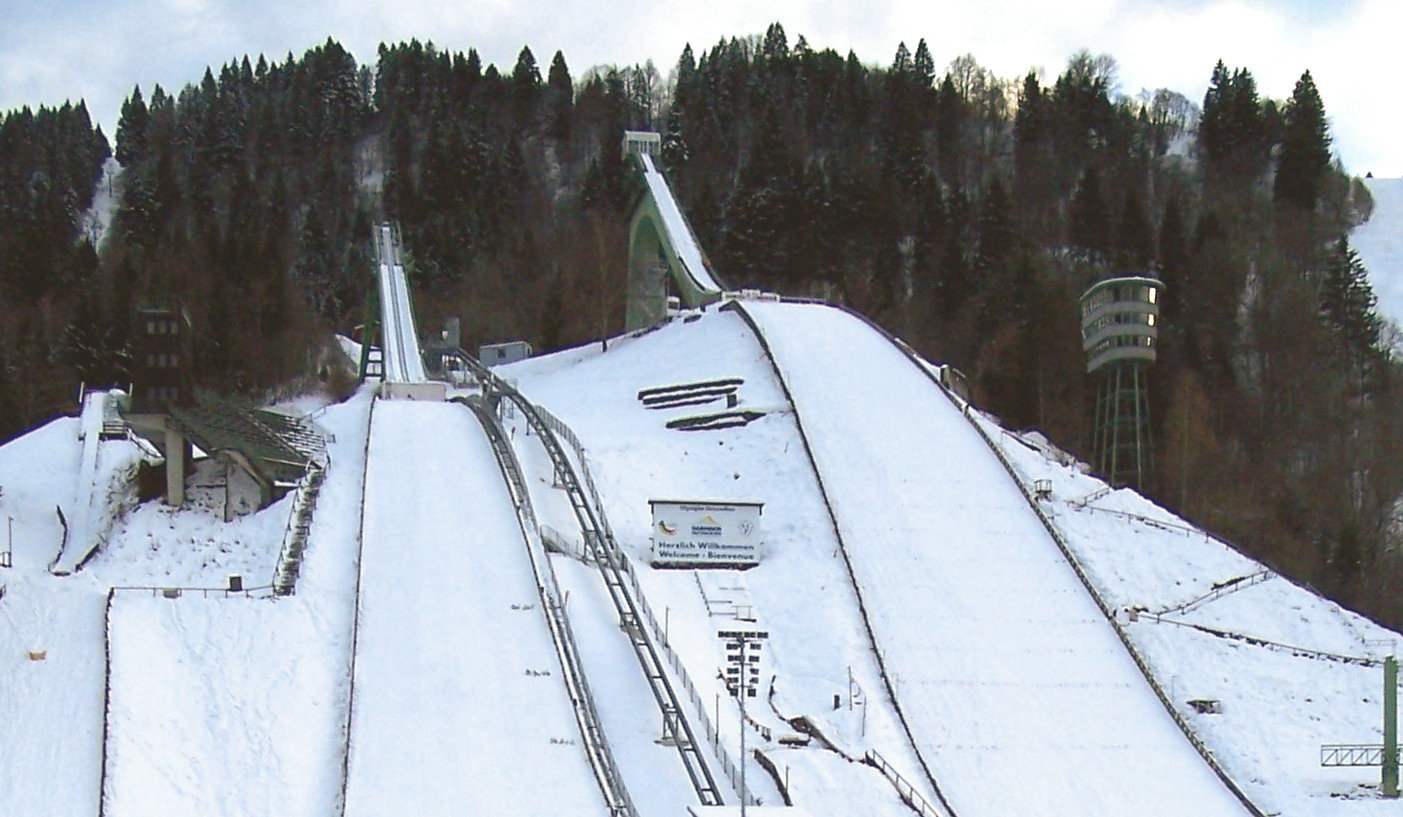
Old Große Olympiaschanze

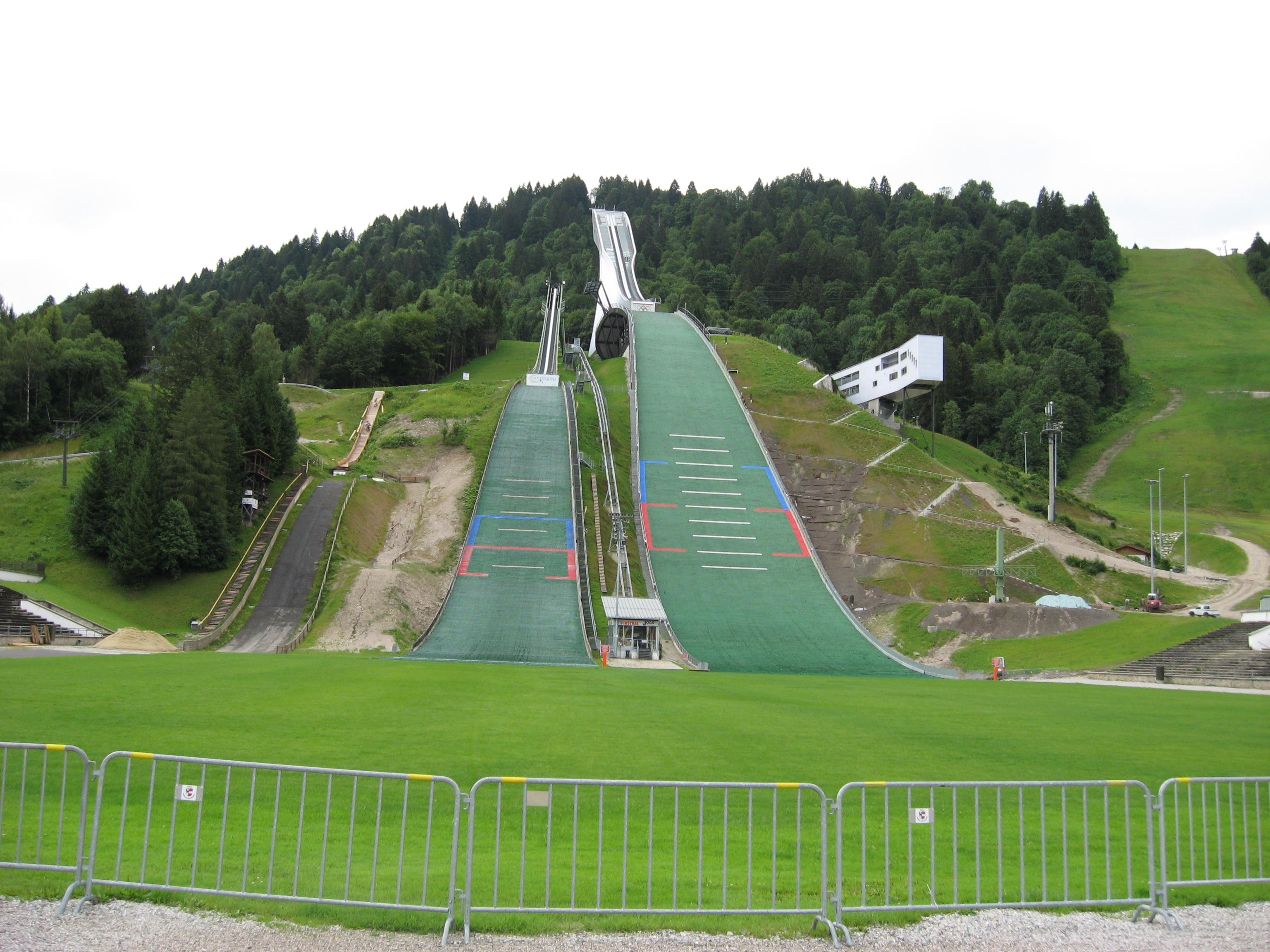
The ramp and hill in Summer

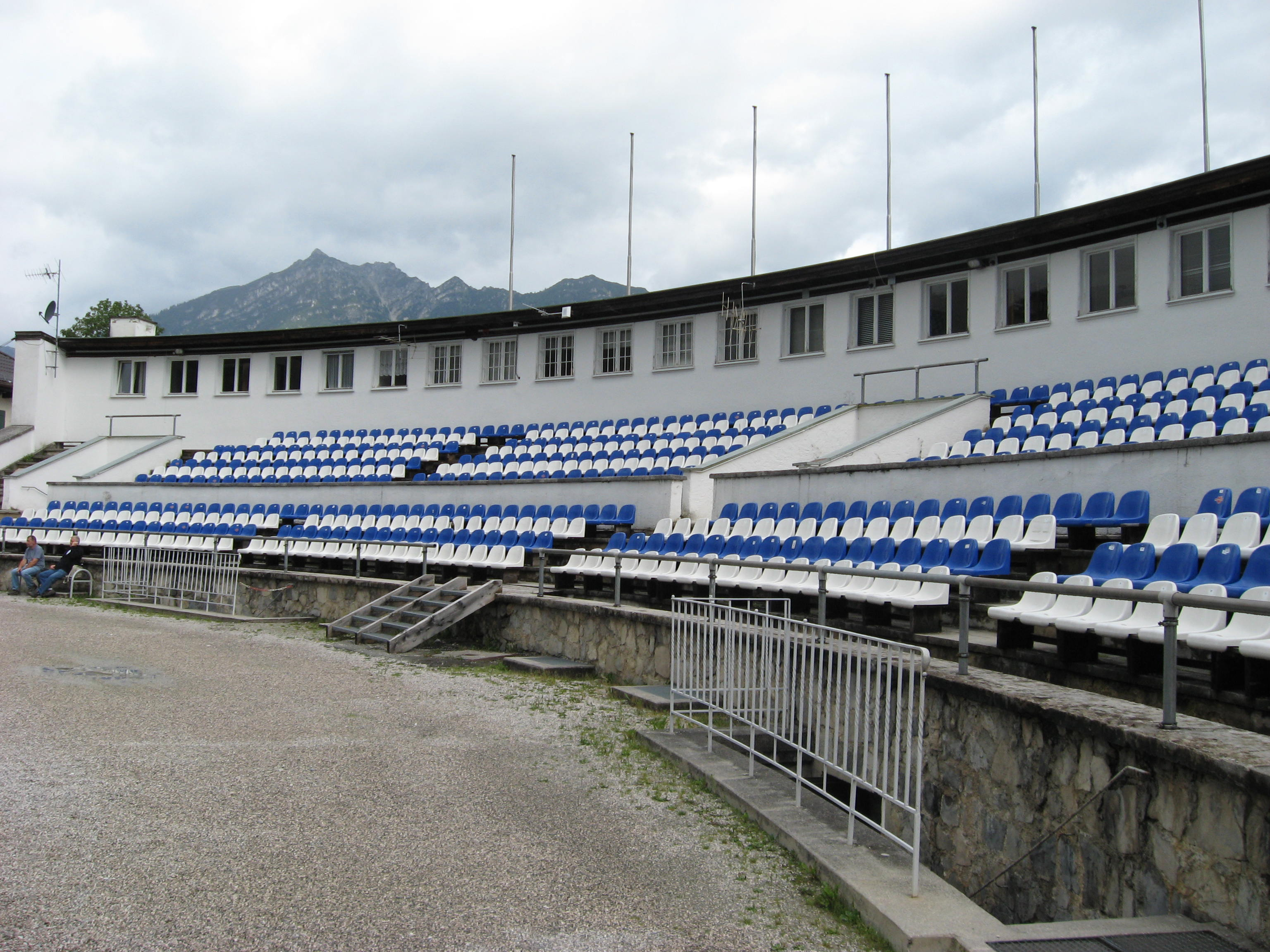
Stands

The Große Olympiaschanze (English: Great Olympic Hill) is a large (K-125) ski jumping hill located on the Gudiberg, south of the district of Partenkirchen of Garmisch-Partenkirchen, Bavaria, Germany, and is traditionally the venue of the Four Hills Tournament's New Year's jumping. The hill is part of a complex that also includes the K-80, K-43 and K-20 ski hills.

== Hill parameters ==
- Construction point: 125 m
- Hill size (HS): 142 m
- Hill record: 145.5 m – (Austria) Stephan Embacher (31 December 2025)
- Inrun length: 96.0 m
- Inrun angle: 35°
- Take-off length: 6.9 m
- Take-off angle: 11°
- Take-off height: 3.2 m
- Landing angle: 34.7°
- Average speed: 94.3 km/h

== 1936 Winter Olympics ==
At the 1936 Winter Olympics, the venue hosted the ski jumping event and the ski jumping part of the Nordic combined event. The outrun of the ski jump formed the ski stadium which held the opening and closing ceremonies and the start / finish area of the cross-country skiing competitions.

== Four Hills Tournament ==
A world cup competition is held there every year on January 1, as a part of the Four Hills Tournament.

== History ==
The first ski jumping hill on the site of the current facility was built in 1921. It was demolished in 1933 to build the Olympic ski jumping hill for the 1936 Winter Olympics. It opened on 5 February 1934. Over the years, the ski jumping hill was expanded four times (in 1950, 1978, 1996 and 2007). Due to a required upgrade of the jump to the advanced technical standards of the International Ski Federation (FIS), the construction of an entirely new ski jump was inevitable. Among projects by Zaha Hadid Architects, Behnisch Architects and others, an international architectural competition in autumn 2006 led to the decision to erect a cantilevering structure as the new landmark of ski sports, designed by terrain:loenhart&mayr. Construction at the site started on April, 26th 2007. The grand opening ceremony at the Continental Cup / Four Hills Tournament was on New Year's Day 2008. The tower offers a panoramic view of the surrounding valley of Garmisch-Partenkirchen.

Adjacent to the ski jumps is the Gudiberg alpine slalom piste, upgraded prior to the 2011 World Championships.

The current hill record is held by Stephan Embacher who jumped 145.5 m on 31 December 2025, during the qualifying round of the annual New Year's Ski Jump.
