= Bergisel Ski Jump =

Ski jumping hill in Innsbruck, Austria

Coordinates: 47°14′56″N 11°23′57″E

Bergisel
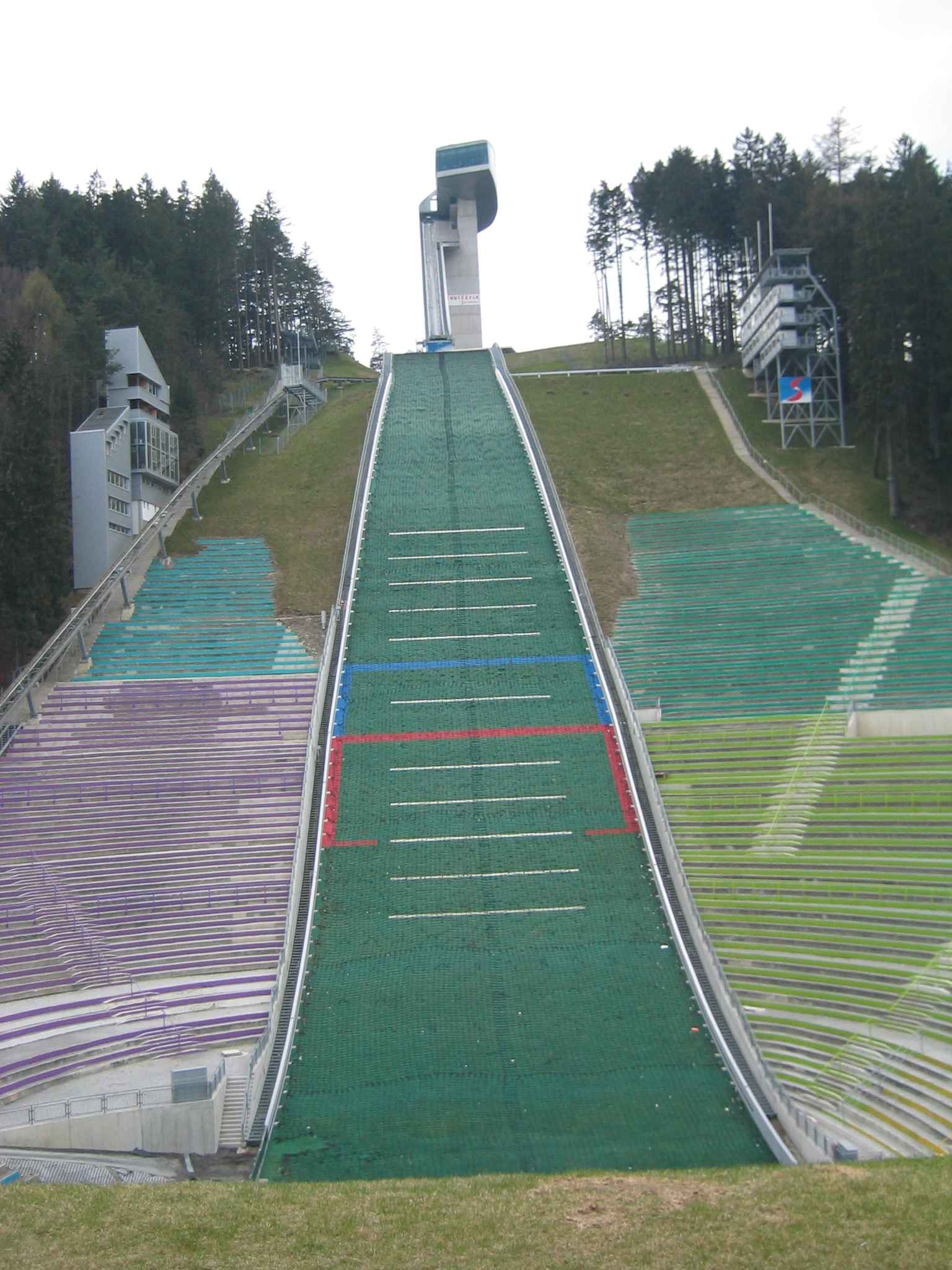
- Location: Innsbruck; Austria
- Opened: 1930
- Expanded: 1964 and 2003

Size
- K–point: K-120
- Hill size: HS128
- Hill record: (Austria) Michael Hayböck (138.0 m in 2015) = Unofficial: Jan Hörl (AUT) 144.0 m in 2019

Top events
- Olympics: 1964, 1976
- World Championships: 1933, 1985, 2019

The Bergisel Ski Jump (German: Bergiselschanze), whose stadium has a capacity of 26,000, is a ski jumping hill located in Bergisel in Innsbruck, Austria. It is one of the more important venues in the FIS Ski Jumping World Cup, annually hosting the third competition of the prestigious Four Hills Tournament.

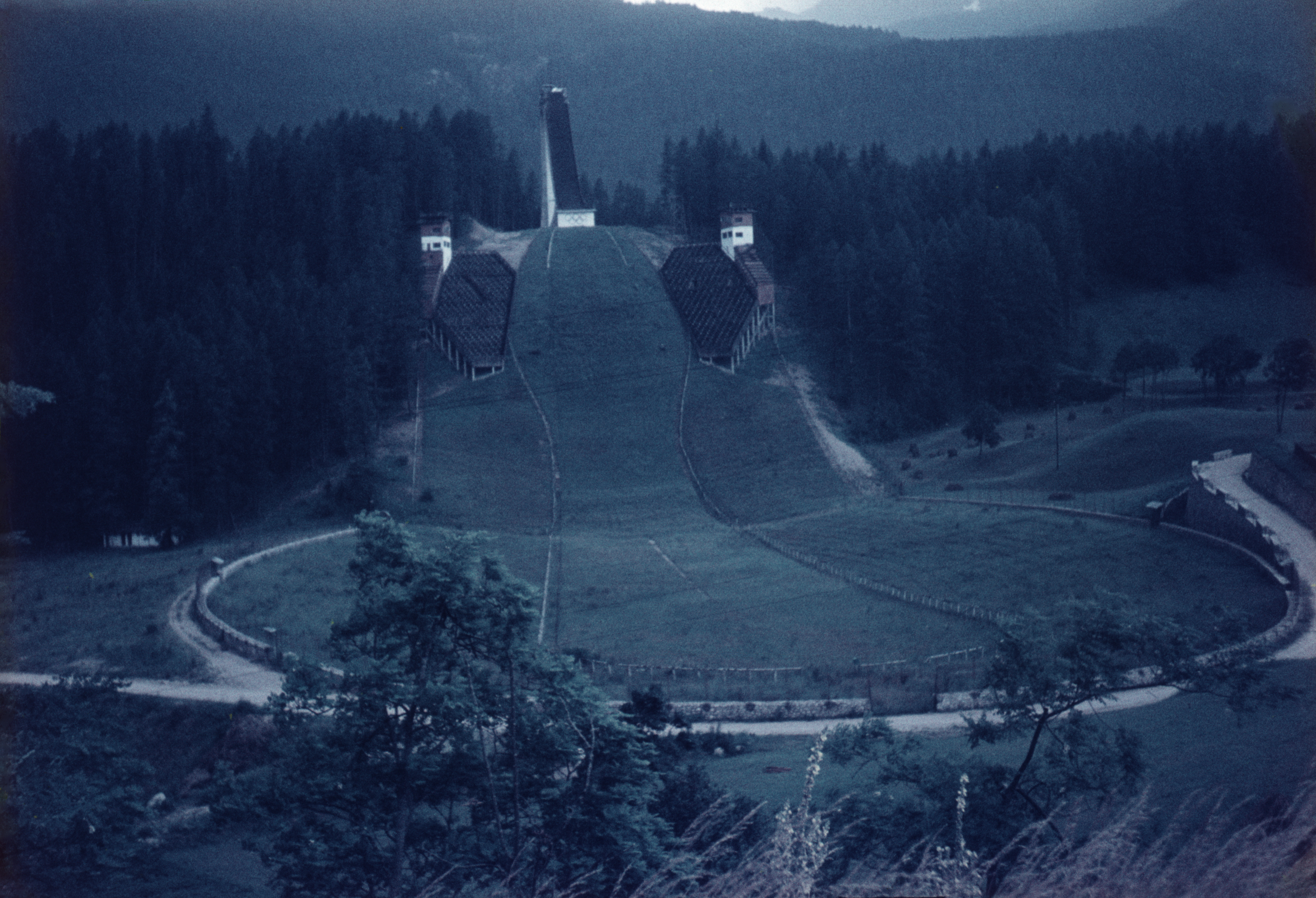
Bergisel ski jump (Winter Olympics 1964, Innsbruck, Austria) Image taken 1966

Its first competitions were held in the 1920s using simple wood constructions. The larger hill was first built in 1930 and was rebuilt before the 1964 Winter Olympics for the individual large hill event. Twelve years later, the venue hosted the same event in the 1976 Winter Olympics. The hill in its current form was finished in 2003 and was designed by the British-Iraqi architect Zaha Hadid.

== See also ==
- List of ski jumping hills

Preceded by Blyth Arena; Squaw Valley	Winter Olympic Games; Opening; 1964	Succeeded by Olympic Stadium; Grenoble

Preceded by Makomanai Open Stadium; Sapporo	Winter Olympic Games; Opening; 1976	Succeeded by Lake Placid Equestrian Stadium; Lake Placid

Preceded by None	Winter Youth Olympics; Opening Ceremonies; 2012	Succeeded by Stampesletta; Lillehammer
