= FIS Ski Flying World Championships 1979 =

1979 edition of the FIS Ski-Flying World Championships

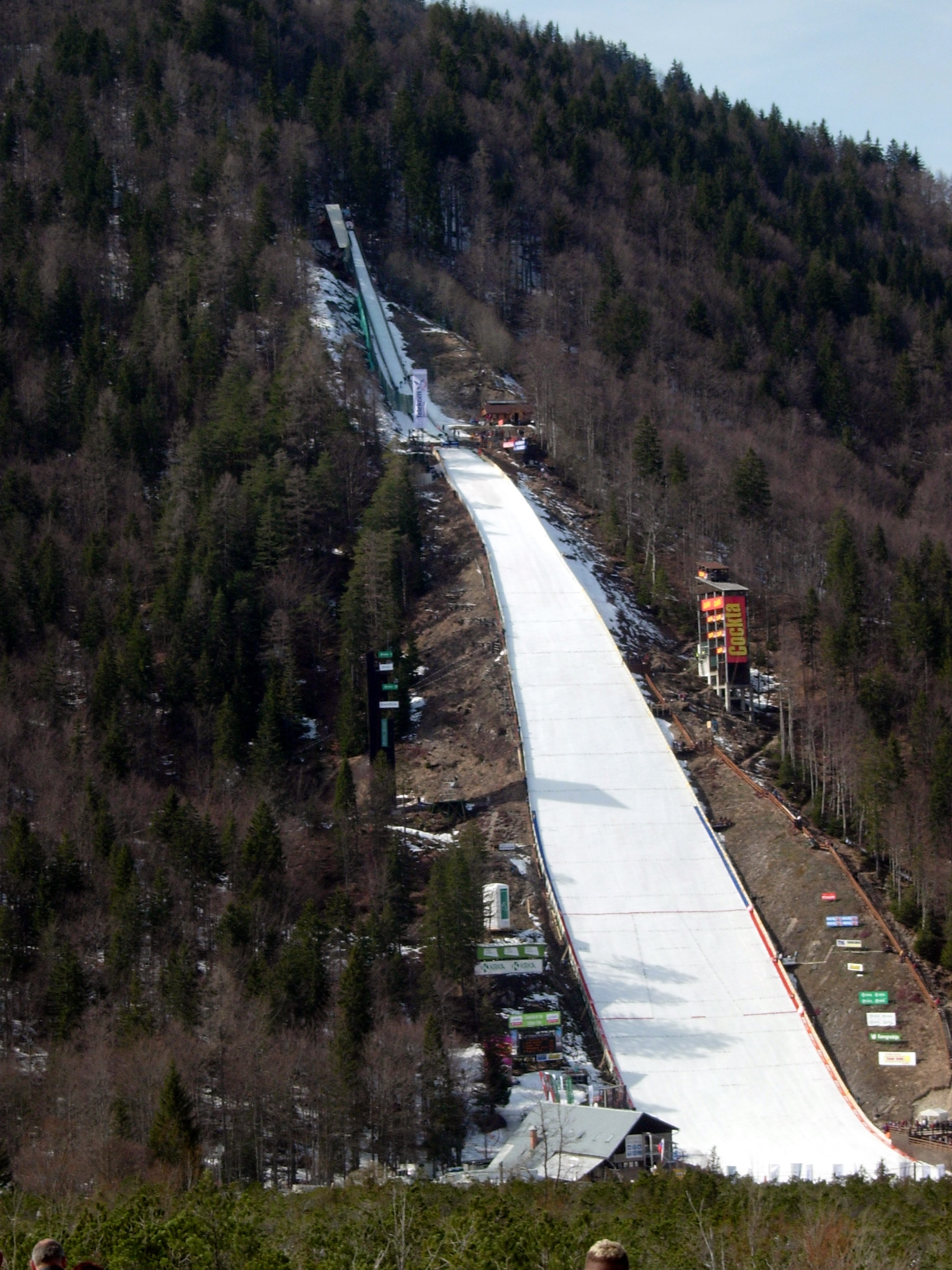
- Venue: Velikanka bratov Gorišek K165
- Date: 17–18 March 1979
- Competitors: 47 from 14 nations
- Winning score: 741.5

Medalists
gold medal	Armin Kogler	Austria
silver medal	Axel Zitzmann	East Germany
bronze medal	Piotr Fijas	Poland

The FIS Ski Flying World Ski Championships 1979 was held between 17 and 18 March in Planica, Yugoslavia for the second time in front of total 115,000 people in four days.

== Schedule ==
Date	Event	Rounds	Longest jump of the day	Visitors
14 March 1979	Hill test	3	158 metres (518 ft) by Janez Loštrek	N/A
15 March 1979	Official Training	2	169 metres (554 ft) by František Novák	10,000
16 March 1979	Competition, Day 1	—	canceled; after 8 test jumpers due to rain	15,000
17 March 1979	Competition, Day 2	3	179 metres (587 ft) by Axel Zitzmann (fall); 171 metres (561 ft) by Ivo Zupan	40,000
18 March 1979	Competition, Day 3	3	176 metres (577 ft) by Klaus Ostwald	50,000

== Rules ==
Scoring system rules were changed in the last moment, just two days before official competition. Originally total 3 of 9 jumps, the best one of each three days was supposed to go into final score. But technical delegate of competition, Norwegian Torbjørn Yggeseth who is known as the founder of the World Cup, proposed the change of rules: total 6 of 9 jumps, the best two of each three days were incorporated. Although only 4 of 6 rounds counted at the end as first day of competition was canceled.

To perform on Saturday and Sunday competition, competitor had to reach 75% average of top 10 jumps in at least one round on official training on Thursday or at first day of competition on Friday.

== Competition ==
On 14 March 1979 hill test in three rounds was on schedule. Križaj opened the hill with 142 metres, Bizjak's binds got off in the inrun and he managed to stop. Loštrek set the longest distance of the day at 158 metres.

On 15 March 1979 official training in front of 10,000 people was on schedule with two rounds in rain. František Novák set the distance of the day at 169 metres.

On 16 March 1979 first day of competition with three rounds was on schedule. Everything was over only after 8 testjumpers on a disappointment of 15,000 people due to heavy rain. Test jumper Ivo Zupan set the distance of the day at 159 metres.

On 17 March 1979 second day of competition with three rounds was on schedule in front of 40,000 people. Test jumper Ivo Zupan was first that day who set Yugoslavian record at 171 metres. In the second round East German Axel Zitzmann crashed at world record distance at 179 metres, second round was canceled and repeated right after. Zitzmann was leading after first 2 best of 3 jumps of second day of competition.

On 18 March 1979 the last day of competition with three rounds was on schedule in front of 50,000 people. A lot of inrun speed/gate testing were made before the first round. Kogler set the best distance of the second round at 156 metres. Just before the third round, East German test jumper Klaus Ostwald set the world record at 176 metres. Armin Kogler became the world champion after 4 of 6 best flights in two days of competition.

C

=== Official training ===
15 March 1979 — 2 rounds — test — chronological order incomplete

Bib	Name	1RD	2RD
Test jumpers
P1	(Socialist Federal Republic of Yugoslavia) Marjan Križaj	139.0 m	N/A
P2	(Socialist Federal Republic of Yugoslavia) Ivo Zupan	145.0 m	152.0 m
P3	(Socialist Federal Republic of Yugoslavia) Andrej Kajzer	138.0 m	N/A
P4	(Socialist Federal Republic of Yugoslavia) Stanko Velikonja	132.0 m	N/A
P5	(Socialist Federal Republic of Yugoslavia) Komel	146.0 m	N/A
P6	(Socialist Federal Republic of Yugoslavia) Anžel	140.0 m	N/A
P7	(Socialist Federal Republic of Yugoslavia) Janez Loštrek	141.0 m	N/A
N/A	(Socialist Federal Republic of Yugoslavia) Vili Tepeš	N/A	157.0 m
N/A	(France) Thierry Sauvanet	109.0 m	N/A
N/A	(East Germany) Klaus Ostwald	N/A	140.0 m

15 March 1979 — 2 rounds (the first repeated) — competitors — chronological order

Bib	Name	1RD (ca)	1RD (re)	2RD
Competitors
1	(Socialist Federal Republic of Yugoslavia) Vasja Bajc	146.0 m	139.0 m	144.0 m
2	(East Germany) Axel Zitzmann	159.0 m	158.0 m	161.0 m
3	(Finland) Esko Rautionaho	153.0 m	146.0 m	137.0 m
4	(Soviet Union) Piroskov	126.0 m	126.0 m	103.0 m
5	(United States) Terry Kern	123.0 m	116.0 m	111.0 m
6	(Japan) Yūji Kawamura	148.0 m	135.0 m	136.0 m
7	(Austria) Alfred Goyer	130.0 m	114.0 m	127.0 m
8	(Norway) Ole Erik Tvedt	131.0 m	118.0 m	—
9	(Czechoslovakia) Ladislav Jirásko	130.0 m	129.0 m	121.0 m
10	(Italy) Ivano Wegher	112.0 m	116.0 m	—
11	(Finland) Jari Puikkonen	119.0 m	144.0 m	135.0 m
12	(Czechoslovakia) František Novák	169.0 m	158.0 m	154.0 m
13	(Norway) Bjarne Næs	—	109.0 m	131.0 m
14	(Soviet Union) Yury Kalinin	—	141.0 m	138.0 m
15	(Japan) Takafumi Kawabata	—	128.0 m	134.0 m
16	(Socialist Federal Republic of Yugoslavia) Primož Ulaga	—	121.0 m	137.0 m
17	(United States) Kip Sundgaard	—	118.0 m	126.0 m
18	(Austria) Hans Wallner	—	148.0 m	132.0 m
19	(West Germany) Hans-Jürgen Eschrisch	—	124.0 m	113.0 m
20	(East Germany) Thomas Meisinger	—	140.0 m	144.0 m
21	(Switzerland) Olivier Favre	—	112.0 m	115.0 m
22	(East Germany) Jochen Danneberg	—	141.0 m	150.0 m
23	(Finland) Kari Ylianttila	—	140.0 m	141.0 m
24	(Czechoslovakia) Ján Tánczos	—	148.0 m	156.0 m
25	(Austria) Hubert Neuper	—	136.0 m	150.0 m
26	(Socialist Federal Republic of Yugoslavia) Zdravko Bogataj	—	128.0 m	131.0 m
27	(United States) Chris McNeill	—	105.0 m	109.0 m
28	(Soviet Union) Valery Savin	—	136.0 m	133.0 m
29	(Japan) Sakaye Tsuruga	—	111.0 m	118.0 m
30	(Switzerland) Roland Glas	—	109.0 m	129.0 m
31	(Italy) Lido Tomasi	—	125.0 m	104.0 m
32	(Norway) Finn Halvorsen	—	117.0 m	121.0 m
33	(West Germany) Thomas Prosser	—	129.0 m	123.0 m
34	(Poland) Piotr Fijas	—	151.0 m	149.0 m
35	(United States) John Broman	—	121.0 m	119.0 m
36	(Soviet Union) Aleksey Borovitin	—	122.0 m	132.0 m
37	(West Germany) Peter Leitner	—	132.0 m	133.0 m
38	(Switzerland) Hansjörg Sumi	—	120.0 m	110.0 m
39	(East Germany) Andreas Hille	—	144.0 m	139.0 m
40	(Norway) Per Steinar Nordlien	—	127.0 m	118.0 m
41	(Poland) Stanisław Bobak	—	140.0 m	130.0 m
42	(East Germany) Harald Duschek	—	131.0 m	144.0 m
43	(Norway) Per Bergerud	—	118.0 m	136.0 m
44	(Japan) Hirokazu Yagi	—	132.0 m	162.0 m
45	(Czechoslovakia) Leoš Škoda	—	149.0 m	119.0 m
46	(Austria) Armin Kogler	—	157.0 m	158.0 m
47	(Czechoslovakia) Josef Samek	—	134.0 m	149.0 m
48	(Soviet Union) Yuri Ivanov	—	153.0 m	145.0 m
49	(Socialist Federal Republic of Yugoslavia) Bogdan Norčič	—	137.0 m	122.0 m
50	(Austria) Alois Lipburger	—	122.0 m	130.0 m
51	(Finland) Pentti Kokkonen	—	147.0 m	120.0 m

=== Competition: Day 1 ===
9:30 AM — 16 March 1979 — 3 rounds — test — chronological order

Bib	Name	1RD	2RD	3RD
Test jumpers
P1	(Socialist Federal Republic of Yugoslavia) Ivo Zupan	159.0 m	N/A	N/A
P2	(Socialist Federal Republic of Yugoslavia) Andrej Kajzer	156.0 m	N/A	N/A
P3	(Socialist Federal Republic of Yugoslavia) Janez Loštrek	140.0 m	N/A	N/A
P4	(Socialist Federal Republic of Yugoslavia) Marko Mlakar	148.0 m	N/A	N/A
P5	(Socialist Federal Republic of Yugoslavia) Vili Tepeš	140.0 m	N/A	N/A
P6	(Socialist Federal Republic of Yugoslavia) Komel	144.0 m	N/A	N/A
P7	(Socialist Federal Republic of Yugoslavia) Stanko Velikonja	126.0 m	N/A	N/A
P8	(Socialist Federal Republic of Yugoslavia) Anžel	141.0 m	N/A	N/A
Competitors
no jumps; canceled after 8 test jumpers; heavy rain

=== Competition: Day 2 ===
17 March 1979 — 2 best of 3 rounds — second round was canceled and repeated — chronological order

Rank	Bib	Name	1RD	2RD (ca)	2RD (re)	3RD	Points
1	10	(East Germany) Axel Zitzmann	156.0 m	179.0 m	170.0 m	168.0 m	380.0
2	41	(Austria) Armin Kogler	160.0 m	—	156.0 m	160.0 m	361.0
3	34	(Poland) Piotr Fijas	149.0 m	—	131.0 m	166.0 m	350.0
	38	(East Germany) Andreas Hille	161.0 m	—	155.0 m	141.0 m	350.0
5	15	(Czechoslovakia) Josef Samek	152.0 m	—	154.0 m	155.0 m	346.0
6	21	(Soviet Union) Yury Kalinin	151.0 m	—	156.0 m	144.0 m	344.0
7	22	(East Germany) Harald Duschek	151.0 m	—	156.0 m	145.0 m	342.5
8	7	(Czechoslovakia) Leoš Škoda	144.0 m	163.0 m	151.0 m	154.0 m	339.0
	42	(Finland) Pentti Kokkonen	156.0 m	—	141.0 m	146.0 m	339.0
10	28	(Finland) Kari Ylianttila	149.0 m	—	155.0 m	136.0 m	337.0
11	23	(Soviet Union) Aleksey Borovitin	146.0 m	—	149.0 m	151.0 m	336.5
12	47	(Czechoslovakia) František Novák	154.0 m	—	144.0 m	141.0 m	329.0
13	33	(Czechoslovakia) Ján Tánczos	155.0 m	—	138.0 m	139.0 m	327.5
14	46	(Poland) Stanisław Bobak	144.0 m	—	137.0 m	149.0 m	326.5
15	14	(Austria) Hans Wallner	150.0 m	—	144.0 m	147.0 m	324.0
16	27	(East Germany) Jochen Danneberg	147.0 m	—	130.0 m	145.0 m	323.5
17	44	(West Germany) Peter Leitner	130.0 m	—	140.0 m	149.0 m	323.0
18	32	(Austria) Hubert Neuper	140.0 m	—	152.0 m	—	321.5
19	9	(Austria) Alois Lipburger	150.0 m	116.0 m	120.0 m	139.0 m	319.5
20	24	(Norway) Per Steinar Nordlien	140.0 m	—	146.0 m	142.0 m	318.5
21	43	(Soviet Union) Yuri Ivanov	134.0 m	—	138.0 m	147.0 m	316.5
22	11	(Finland) Jari Puikkonen	139.0 m	—	146.0 m	141.0 m	312.5
23	30	(Japan) Sakaye Tsuruga	144.0 m	—	136.0 m	118.0 m	310.5
24	39	(Japan) Hirokazu Yagi	136.0 m	—	136.0 m	143.0 m	309.0
25	3	(Finland) Esko Rautionaho	130.0 m	148.0 m	141.0 m	137.0 m	307.5
26	6	(Socialist Federal Republic of Yugoslavia) Bogdan Norčič	138.0 m	148.0 m	137.0 m	134.0 m	301.5
27	29	(Socialist Federal Republic of Yugoslavia) Primož Ulaga	138.0 m	—	139.0 m	133.0 m	300.0
28	19	(Japan) Takafumi Kawabata	124.0 m	—	149.0 m	123.0 m	297.5
29	5	(Soviet Union) Valery Savin	147.0 m	148.0 m	132.0 m	135.0 m	295.5
30	36	(Switzerland) Hansjörg Sumi	126.0 m	—	135.0 m	133.0 m	293.5
31	8	(Japan) Yūji Kawamura	132.0 m	144.0 m	123.0 m	133.0 m	292.5
32	45	(Socialist Federal Republic of Yugoslavia) Vasja Bajc	132.0 m	—	134.0 m	131.0 m	291.5
33	31	(United States) Kip Sundgaard	118.0 m	—	133.0 m	129.0 m	289.5
34	25	(Switzerland) Roland Glas	136.0 m	—	123.0 m	129.0 m	286.5
35	18	(Norway) Finn Halvorsen	130.0 m	—	125.0 m	131.0 m	283.5
36	20	(United States) Terry Kern	122.0 m	—	132.0 m	127.0 m	280.5
37	40	(Norway) Per Bergerud	127.0 m	—	122.0 m	132.0 m	278.5
38	37	(United States) John Broman	132.0 m	—	127.0 m	125.0 m	278.0
39	13	(West Germany) Hans-Jürgen Eschrisch	130.0 m	—	127.0 m	126.0 m	277.0
	16	(Switzerland) Olivier Favre	120.0 m	—	127.0 m	127.0 m	277.0
41	1	(Norway) Bjarne Næs	129.0 m	147.0 m	106.0 m	119.0 m	263.5
42	35	(West Germany) Thomas Prosser	124.0 m	—	101.0 m	114.0 m	258.5
43	12	(Socialist Federal Republic of Yugoslavia) Zdravko Bogataj	109.0 m	—	117.0 m	119.0 m	255.0
44	17	(Italy) Ivano Wegher	114.0 m	—	116.0 m	115.0 m	249.0
45	4	(United States) Chris McNeill	119.0 m	132.0 m	116.0 m	112.0 m	248.0
46	26	(Italy) Lido Tomasi	111.0 m	—	118.0 m	96.0 m	234.5
47	2	(France) Thierry Sauvanet	105.0 m	117.0 m	94.0 m	96.0 m	202.0

=== Competition: Day 3 ===
18 March 1979 — incomplete — test

Bib	Name	1RD	2RD	3RD
Test jumpers
N/A	(Socialist Federal Republic of Yugoslavia) Vili Tepeš	165.0 m	N/A	156.0 m
N/A	(Socialist Federal Republic of Yugoslavia) Križaj	154.0 m	N/A	N/A
N/A	(Socialist Federal Republic of Yugoslavia) Komel	157.0 m	N/A	N/A
N/A	(Socialist Federal Republic of Yugoslavia) Janez Loštrek	N/A	N/A	144.0 m
N/A	(Czechoslovakia) Ladislav Jirásko	N/A	N/A	150.0 m
N/A	(Austria) Alfred Groyer	N/A	N/A	155.0 m
N/A	(East Germany) Thomas Meisinger	N/A	N/A	162.0 m
P54	(East Germany) Klaus Ostwald	175.0 m	N/A	176.0 m

18 March 1979 — 2 best of 3 rounds — competitors

Rank	Name	1RD	2RD	Points
Competitors
1	(Austria) Armin Kogler	168.0 m	169.0 m	380.5
2	(East Germany) Axel Zitzmann	159.0 m	157.0 m	356.0
3	(Poland) Piotr Fijas	152.0 m	162.0 m	354.5
4	(Soviet Union) Yury Kalinin	157.0 m	151.0 m	354.0
5	(Czechoslovakia) Leoš Škoda	151.0 m	156.0 m	343.0
6	(Finland) Pentti Kokkonen	155.0 m	149.0 m	342.5
7	(Czechoslovakia) Josef Samek	153.0 m	163.0 m	342.0
8	(East Germany) Andreas Hille	151.0 m	151.0 m	340.5
9	(East Germany) Harald Duschek	150.0 m	149.0 m	333.0
10	(Japan) Hirokazu Yagi	147.0 m	155.0 m	332.5
11	(East Germany) Jochen Danneberg	147.0 m	147.0 m	331.5
12	(Norway) Per Steinar Nordlien	146.0 m	146.0 m	327.5
13	(West Germany) Peter Leitner	137.0 m	152.0 m	325.0
14	(Finland) Kari Ylianttila	148.0 m	140.0 m	323.5
15	(Finland) Esko Rautionaho	146.0 m	140.0 m	323.0
16	(Austria) Hans Wallner	137.0 m	144.0 m	315.5
17	(Soviet Union) Valery Savin	136.0 m	149.0 m	315.0
18	(Austria) Alois Lipburger	140.0 m	143.0 m	313.0
19	(Japan) Sakaye Tsuruga	145.0 m	136.0 m	309.0
20	(Soviet Union) Yuri Ivanov	136.0 m	139.0 m	306.5
21	(Soviet Union) Aleksey Borovitin	133.0 m	139.0 m	305.5
22	(Czechoslovakia) Ján Tánczos	131.0 m	139.0 m	301.5
23	(Socialist Federal Republic of Yugoslavia) Primož Ulaga	133.0 m	140.0 m	300.5
24	(Finland) Jari Puikkonen	132.0 m	137.0 m	297.0
25	(Socialist Federal Republic of Yugoslavia) Bogdan Norčič	132.0 m	136.0 m	296.5
26	(Japan) Takafumi Kawabata	126.0 m	145.0 m	296.0
27	(Poland) Stanisław Bobak	130.0 m	136.0 m	295.0
28	(Norway) Per Bergerud	136.0 m	136.0 m	292.5
	(Czechoslovakia) František Novák	133.0 m	100.0 m	292.5
30	(United States) Kip Sundgaard	134.0 m	133.0 m	291.0
31	(Norway) Bjarne Næs	135.0 m	130.0 m	283.5
32	(Switzerland) Hansjörg Sumi	128.0 m	130.0 m	282.5
33	(Socialist Federal Republic of Yugoslavia) Vasja Bajc	127.0 m	133.0 m	280.5
34	(West Germany) Thomas Prosser	129.0 m	131.0 m	287.5
35	(Norway) Finn Halvorsen	123.0 m	129.0 m	275.0
36	(Socialist Federal Republic of Yugoslavia) Zdravko Bogataj	129.0 m	120.0 m	270.5
37	(United States) Terry Kern	124.0 m	126.0 m	269.5
38	(Japan) Yūji Kawamura	120.0 m	124.0 m	267.5
39	(United States) John Broman	120.0 m	120.0 m	259.0
40	(West Germany) Hans-Jürgen Eschrisch	119.0 m	118.0 m	256.5
41	(United States) Chris McNeill	120.0 m	120.0 m	255.0
42	(Italy) Ivano Wegher	114.0 m	118.0 m	248.0
	(Switzerland) Olivier Favre	115.0 m	116.0 m	248.0
44	(Switzerland) Roland Glas	117.0 m	114.0 m	247.5
45	(France) Thierry Sauvanet	119.0 m	112.0 m	238.5

Not recognized. Crash at WR! Didn't count into final results!
Didn't count into final result!
World record!
Crash, touch!

== Official results ==
17 to 18 March 1979 — 4 best of 6 rounds — first day canceled — originally 6 best of 9 rounds scheduled

Rank	Name	D2 (17 March 1979)		D3 (18 March 1979)		Points
Rank	Name	1RD	2RD	3RD	4RD	Points
1st place, gold medalist(s)	(Austria) Armin Kogler	160.0 m	160.0 m	168.0 m	169.0 m	741.5
2nd place, silver medalist(s)	(East Germany) Axel Zitzmann	170.0 m	168.0 m	159.0 m	157.0 m	736.0
3rd place, bronze medalist(s)	(Poland) Piotr Fijas	149.0 m	166.0 m	152.0 m	162.0 m	704.5
4	(East Germany) Andreas Hille	161.0 m	155.0 m	151.0 m	151.0 m	690.5
5	(Czechoslovakia) Josef Samek	154.0 m	155.0 m	153.0 m	163.0 m	688.0
6	(Soviet Union) Yury Kalinin	151.0 m	156.0 m	157.0 m	151.0 m	687.5
7	(Czechoslovakia) Leoš Škoda	151.0 m	154.0 m	151.0 m	156.0 m	682.0
8	(Finland) Pentti Kokkonen	156.0 m	146.0 m	155.0 m	149.0 m	681.5
9	(East Germany) Harald Duschek	151.0 m	156.0 m	150.0 m	149.0 m	677.0
10	(Finland) Kari Ylianttila	149.0 m	155.0 m	148.0 m	140.0 m	660.5
11	(East Germany) Jochen Danneberg	147.0 m	145.0 m	147.0 m	147.0 m	655.0
12	(West Germany) Peter Leitner	140.0 m	139.0 m	137.0 m	152.0 m	648.0
13	(Norway) Per Steinar Nordlien	146.0 m	142.0 m	146.0 m	146.0 m	646.0
14	(Soviet Union) Aleksey Borovitin	149.0 m	151.0 m	133.0 m	139.0 m	641.5
	(Japan) Hirokazu Yagi	136.0 m	143.0 m	147.0 m	155.0 m	641.5
16	(Austria) Hans Wallner	150.0 m	147.0 m	137.0 m	144.0 m	639.5
17	(Austria) Alois Lipburger	150.0 m	139.0 m	140.0 m	143.0 m	632.5
18	(Finland) Esko Rautionaho	141.0 m	147.0 m	146.0 m	140.0 m	630.5
19	(Czechoslovakia) Ján Tánczos	155.0 m	139.0 m	131.0 m	139.0 m	629.0
20	(Soviet Union) Yuri Ivanov	138.0 m	147.0 m	136.0 m	139.0 m	623.5
21	(Czechoslovakia) František Novák	154.0 m	144.0 m	133.0 m	100.0 m	621.5
	(Poland) Stanisław Bobak	144.0 m	149.0 m	130.0 m	136.0 m	621.5
23	(Japan) Sakaye Tsuruga	144.0 m	136.0 m	145.0 m	136.0 m	619.5
24	(Soviet Union) Valery Savin	132.0 m	105.0 m	136.0 m	149.0 m	610.5
25	(Finland) Jari Puikkonen	146.0 m	141.0 m	132.0 m	137.0 m	609.5
26	(Socialist Federal Republic of Yugoslavia) Primož Ulaga	138.0 m	139.0 m	133.0 m	140.0 m	600.5
27	(Socialist Federal Republic of Yugoslavia) Bogdan Norčič	138.0 m	137.0 m	132.0 m	136.0 m	598.0
28	(Japan) Takafumi Kawabata	124.0 m	149.0 m	126.0 m	145.0 m	593.5
29	(United States) Kip Sundgaard	133.0 m	129.0 m	134.0 m	133.0 m	580.5
30	(Switzerland) Hansjörg Sumi	135.0 m	133.0 m	128.0 m	130.0 m	576.0
31	(Socialist Federal Republic of Yugoslavia) Vasja Bajc	134.0 m	131.0 m	127.0 m	133.0 m	572.0
32	(Norway) Per Bergerud	127.0 m	132.0 m	136.0 m	136.0 m	571.0
33	(Japan) Yūji Kawamura	132.0 m	133.0 m	120.0 m	124.0 m	560.0
34	(United States) Terry Kern	132.0 m	127.0 m	124.0 m	126.0 m	550.0
	(Norway) Finn Halvorsen	130.0 m	131.0 m	123.0 m	129.0 m	550.0
36	(Norway) Bjarne Næs	129.0 m	119.0 m	135.0 m	130.0 m	547.0
37	(West Germany) Thomas Prosser	124.0 m	114.0 m	129.0 m	131.0 m	537.0
	(United States) John Broman	132.0 m	125.0 m	120.0 m	120.0 m	537.0
39	(Switzerland) Roland Glas	136.0 m	129.0 m	117.0 m	114.0 m	534.0
40	(West Germany) Hans-Jürgen Eschrisch	130.0 m	126.0 m	119.0 m	118.0 m	533.5
41	(Socialist Federal Republic of Yugoslavia) Zdravko Bogataj	117.0 m	119.0 m	129.0 m	120.0 m	525.5
42	(Switzerland) Olivier Favre	127.0 m	127.0 m	115.0 m	116.0 m	525.0
43	(United States) Chris McNeill	119.0 m	116.0 m	120.0 m	120.0 m	503.0
44	(Italy) Ivano Wegher	116.0 m	115.0 m	114.0 m	118.0 m	497.0
45	(France) Thierry Sauvanet	105.0 m	96.0 m	119.0 m	112.0 m	440.5
46	(Austria) Hubert Neuper	140.0 m	152.0 m	—	—	321.5
47	(Italy) Lido Tomasi	111.0 m	118.0 m	—	—	234.5

== Ski flying world records ==
Date	Name	Country	Metres	Feet
17 March 1979	Axel Zitzmann	East Germany	179	587
18 March 1979	Klaus Ostwald	East Germany	176	577

Not recognized! Crash at world record distance.

== Medal table ==
Rank	Nation	Gold	Silver	Bronze	Total
1	Austria (AUT)	1	0	0	1
2	East Germany (GDR)	0	1	0	1
3	Poland (POL)	0	0	1	1
Totals (3 entries)		1	1	1	3
