= Avsenik Brothers Ensemble =

Yugoslavian/Slovenian musical group

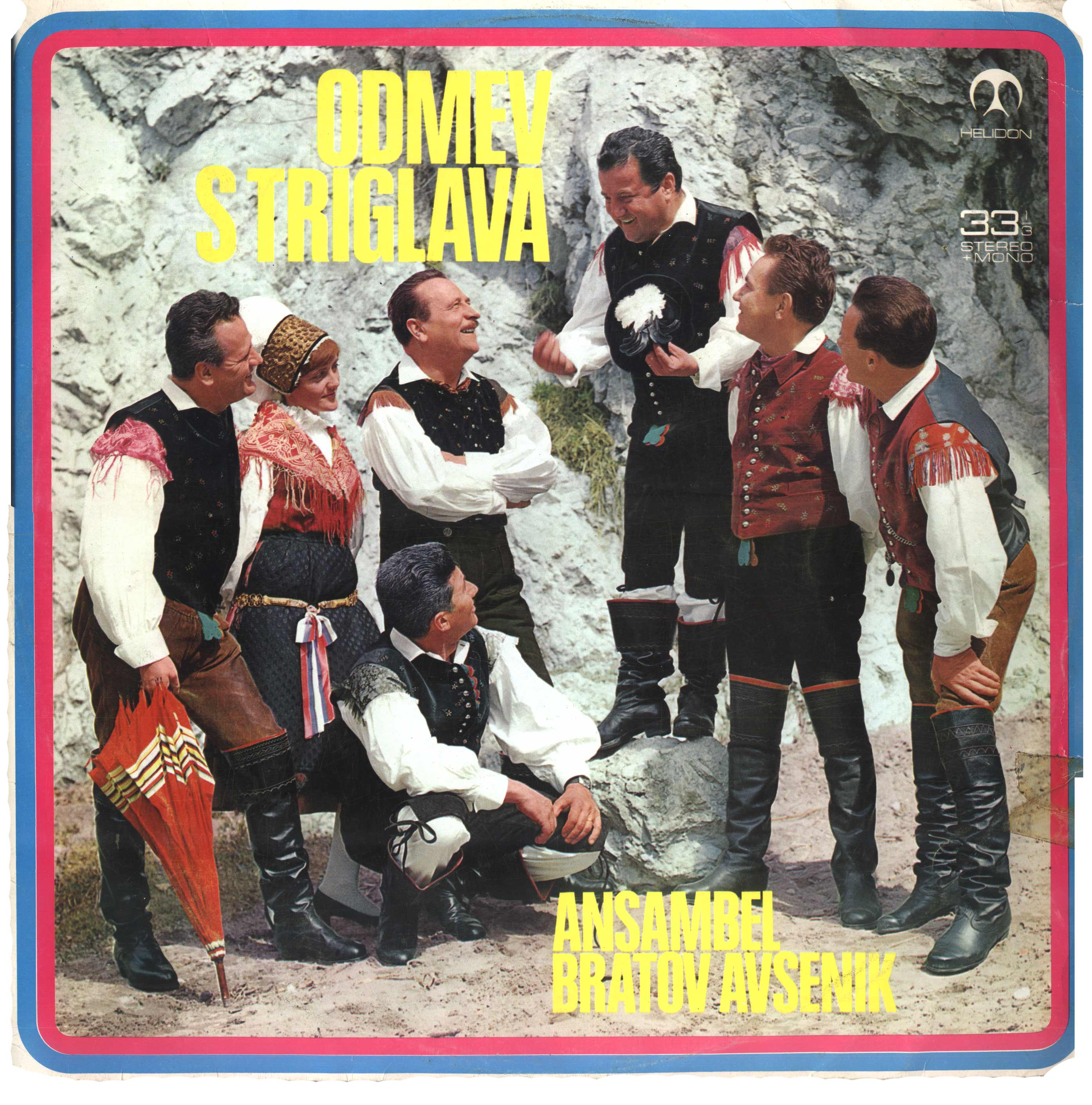

Background information
- Origin: Begunje na Gorenjskem, PR Slovenia
- Genres: Oberkrain ethnic, polka, waltz, volksmusic
- Years active: 1953–1990
- Labels: Telefunken, Teldec, Jugoton, Helidon
- Past members: Slavko Avsenik; Vilko Ovsenik; Lev Ponikvar; Franc Košir; Albin Rudan; Mik Soss; Franc Koren; Danica Filiplič; Ema Prodnik; Jožica Svete; Alfi Nipič; Joži Kališnik; Jože Balažic; Franci Teržan; Franci Ogrizek; Borut Finžgar; Mitja Butara; Igor Podpečan
- Website: avsenik.com

Avsenik Brothers Ensemble (Slovene: Ansambel bratov Avsenik) (German: Slavko Avsenik und seine Original Oberkrainer) were a Slovene Oberkrainer music band formed by the brothers Slavko Avsenik and Vilko Avsenik in 1953 in Begunje na Gorenjskem. The music for their repertoire of about 1000 songs was all written by Slavko and arranged by Vilko, an academic composer. Lyrics for their songs were written by Marjan Stare, Ferry Souvan, Ivan Sivec, Franc Košir, Tone Fornezzi, Vinko Šimek and others.

The band changed the name several times. They started as a trio, then formed a quartet and finally formed a quintet with two or three singers. They were and remain particularly popular in Austria, Germany, Switzerland and the Slovene diaspora over the world. The band invented the Oberkrainer music, a new music genre of volksmusik and sold over 32 million records, which makes them the best selling Slovene music artists ever. They performed over 10,000 concerts all over the world, three times in the Berlin Philharmonic. Their biggest hit Na Golici (Trompetenecho), written by Slavko Avsenik and released in 1955, is according to some the most played instrumental piece of music in history. The band disbanded in 1990 due to Slavko's problems with his spine.

== Discography ==
=== Singles ===
Song	Year	German	English
"Na Golici"	1955	Trompetenecho	On Golica
"Na Robleku"	1957	Na Robleku	On Roblek
"Tam, kjer murke cveto"	1957	Tam, kjer murke cveto	Where the European Orchids Flower
"Na mostu"	1957	Na mostu	On the Bridge
"Prelepa Gorenjska"	1959	Das schöne Land Krain	Beautiful Upper Carniola
"Pastirček"	1963	Hirtenlied	The Little Shepherd
"Mi se 'mamo radi"	1965	Mi se 'mamo radi	We Love Each Other
"E e k' je luštno"	1966	Ja, Ja, Das Ist Lustig	Yes, Yes, it is fun
"Otoček sredi jezera"	1968		Small Island in the Middle of the Lake
"Na avtocesti"	1970	Auf der Autobahn	On the Highway
"Prijatelji, ostanimo prijatelji"	1973	Freunde Wir Bleiben Freunde	Friends, Let's Stay Friends
"Slovenija, odkod lepote tvoje"	1974	Slowenien, Du Mein Heimatland	Slovenia, Where Your Beauties Come From
"Planica, Planica"	1979	Planica, Planica	Planica, Planica
"Pod cvetočimi kostanji"	1980	Unter Blühenden Kastanien	Under the Flowering Chestnuts
"Samo enkrat imaš 50 let"	1981		You're 50 Only Once
"Prav fletno se imamo"	1984		We're Really Groovy
"Vse moje misli so pri tebi"	1986		All My Thoughts Are With You
"Lepo je biti muzikant"		Es ist so schön ein Musikant zu sein	It's Nice to be a Musician
"Slovenski pozdravi"			The Slovene Greetings
"Veter nosi pesem mojo"			The Wind carries my Song
"Vlak drvi"		Die kleine Eisenbahn	Train is speeding
