= List of songs by Slavko Avsenik =

This is a list of songs by the folk music composer and performer Slavko Avsenik (1929–2015). Avsenik wrote around 1000 songs altogether, in Slovene and German.

== List ==
- Aljažev stolp ("Aljaž Tower")
- Bele lilije ("White Lilies")
- Breze v vetru ("Birches in the Wind")
- Casanova
- Cvetlični valček ("The Flower Waltz")
- Cvetoče tulpe ("The Flowering Tulips")
- Cvetoči lokvanj ("The Flowering Water Lily")
- Čakala bom ("I Will Wait")
- Čar Julijskih alp ("The Charm of the Julian Alps")
- Če prideš nazaj ("If You Come Back")
- Če te Gorenjc povabi ("If an Upper Carniolan Invites You")
- Če te Gorenjc povabi in malo mešano ("If an Upper Carniolan Invites You and a Little Mixed")
- Če vinček govori ("If the Dear Wine Talks")
- Če zunaj dežuje ("If It Rains Outside")
- Čevapčiči in ražnjiči in dobra kaplica ("Čevapčiči and Grilled Skewers and Good Wine")
- Čez korensko sedlo ("Over the Koren Saddle")
- Čez Ljubelj ("Over the Ljubelj Pass")
- Čujte me, čujte, mamca vi ("Hear Me, Hear, You Mummy")
- Dedek mraz prihaja ("Grandfather Frost Comes")
- Dedek pridi na ples ("Grandpa Come to the Dance")
- Dilce se lomijo ("The Planks Break")
- Dišeče rože ("The Fragrant Flowers")
- Dobro jutro striček Janez ("Good Morning Uncle John")
- Dolge so noči ("Long Are the Nights")
- Domače veselje ("The Home Joy")
- Dopust se bliža ("The Holiday Is Coming")
- Drija drajsom polka ("Drija Drajsom Polka")
- Družinski praznik ("The Family Feast")
- Drvarska polka ("The Lumberjack Polka")
- Ej, takšni smo vsi ("Hey, We're All Like That")
- En, dva in tri ("One, Two and Three")
- Enkrat ja, enkrat ne ("Once Yes, Once No")
- Enkrat levo, dvakrat desno ("Once Left, Two Times Right")
- Enkrat na leto praznujem ("Once a Year I Celebrate")
- Fant s kitaro ("The Boy with the Guitar")
- Fantje, zdaj pa domov ("Fellows, Let's Go Home Now")
- Fantovsko veselje ("The Boy's Joy")
- Franc vseved ("Franc the Know-All")
- Gasilec Franc ("The Firefighter Franc")
- Godrnanje in meketanje ("Growling and Bleating")
- Gor pa dol ("Up and Down")
- Gozdarjeva povest ("The Lumberjack's Story")
- Gozdovi v mesečini ("Forests in the Moonshine")
- Gremo na Gorenjsko ("Let's go to Upper Carniola")
- Gremo na ples ("Let's Go to the Dance")
- Gremo na Pokljuko ("Let's Go to Pokljuka")
- Ha, ha, Košir se še ne da ("Ha, ha, Košir Doesn't Yet Give Up")
- Harmonika in orglice ("The Accordion and the Harmonica")
- Hodil po gozdu sem ("I Walked Through the Forest")
- Holadri holadra
- Hopla-hopla polka ("Hopla–Hopla Polka")
- Hribovski valček ("The Hill Waltz")
- Igral sem na orglice ("I Played the Harmonica")
- Ivanka
- Iz Bohinja ("From Bohinj")
- Iz Hotemaž v Tupal´če ("From Hotemaže to Tupal´če")
- Iz naših krajev ("From Our Places")
- Izlet na deželo ("The Trip to the Country")
- Izlet na Jamnik ("The Trip to Jamnik")
- Izlet v Istro ("The Trip to Istria")
- Jadraj z menoj ("Sail with Me")
- Jadranje nad Gorenjsko ("Sailing Above Upper Carniola")
- Jaz pa pojdem k ljub'ci v vas ("I Go to Court My Sweatheart")
- Jaz sem pa en Franc Košir ("I Am One Franc Košir")
- Je že 35 let ("It Is Already 35 Years")
- Je že pač tako ("It Just Is So")
- Jej, jej, k'mam težko glavo ("My, O, May, My Head Is So Heavy")
- Jesenska polka ("The Autumn Polka")
- Jubilejna koračnica ("The Jubilee March")
- Juhej, zavriskaj in zapoj ("Juhey, Shout and Sing")
- Jurčki in lisičke ("Porcinis and Chanterelles")
- Jutranja zarja ("The Morning Dawn")
- Jutranjica na obzorju ("The Morning Star on the Horizon")
- Jutro na deželi ("The Morning in the Country")
- Južek in Marta ("Južek and Marta")
- Kadar bom vandral ("When I Will Bum Around")
- Kadar grem na Rodne ("When I Go to Rodne")
- Kadar na rajžo se podam ("When I go to a Travel")
- Kadar pridem na planinco ("When I Come to the Little Pasture")
- Kaj da rečem ("What to Say")
- Kaj pa reče mamca moja ("What Does My Mummy Say")
- Kako bi jo spoznal ("How to Meet Her")
- Kakor je tud' res ("As It Is Also True")
- Kam tako hitiš ("Where Do You Hurry So Much")
- Kje je sreča ("Where Is Happiness")
- Klemenčkova ("The Klemenček Polka")
- Klic domovine ("The Call of the Homeland")
- Klic z gora ("The Call from the Mountains")
- Kmalu spet nasvidenje ("Goodbye Soon")
- Kmetič praznuje ("The Little Farmer Celebrates")
- Ko bom k vojakom šel ("When I Go to the Army")
- Ko boš tod mimo šel ("When You Go Hereby")
- Ko lovec na štoru je spal ("When the Hunter Slept on a Stump")
- Ko mesec sveti ("When the Moon Shines")
- Ko se zjutraj prebudim ("When I Wake up in the Morning")
- Koledniška polka ("The Carol Singer Polka")
- Komedijanti prihajajo ("The Comedians Come")
- Koračnica Julijskih Alp ("The Julian Alps March")
- Koroška polka ("The Carinthia Polka")
- Kraguljčki na saneh ("The Sleigh Bells")
- Krivci mojega klobuka ("My Hat's Brims")
- Križi in težave ("Worries and Problems")
- Lahovška polka ("The Italian Polka")
- Le kdo ve ("Just Who Knows")
- Le vrni se ("Just Come Back")
- Leo je zaljubljen ("Leo Is in Love")
- Lep spomin, ljubica ("Nice Memory, My Dear")
- Lepe ste ve Karavanke ("You're Beautiful the Karawanks")
- Lepo je biti muzikant ("It Is Nice to Be a Musician")
- Lepo je s teboj ("It Is Nice to Be with You")
- Lisička in Marička ("The Little Fox and Little Mary")
- Ljubezen in hrepenenje ("The Love and the Longing")
- Ljubici v slovo ("To the Dear in Goodbye")
- Ljubljanska noč ("The Ljubljana Night")
- Lov na polhe ("The Doormouse Hunt")
- Lovci prihajajo ("The Hunters Come")
- Lovska koračnica ("The Hunter's March")
- Lovska trofeja ("The Hunting Trophy")
- Luštna kelnarca ("The Spiffy Waitress")
- Lutka ("The Doll")
- Majski valček ("The May Waltz")
- Mavrica čez Gorenjsko ("The Rainbow Over Upper Carniola")
- Med rojaki v Ameriki ("Among the Compatriots in America")
- Melodija za tebe ("The Melody for You")
- Mi ne gremo na drugi planet ("We Won't Go to Another Planet")
- Mini-polka ("The Mini–Polka")
- Miss Kaktus ("Miss Cactus")
- Moj Floki ("My Floki [a dog]")
- Moj hobi ("My Hobby")
- Moj očka ima konjička dva ("My Daddy Has Two Little Horses")
- Moj rodni kraj, moj rodni dom ("My Birth Place, My Birth Home")
- Moja zlata Mišika ("My Golden Mišika")
- Moje sanje ("My Dreams")
- Moji tašči ("To My Mother-in-Law")
- Na avtocesti ("Auf der Autobahn") (On the Highway)
- Na deželi ("In the Country")
- Na festivalu ("At the Festival")
- Na Golici ("Trompetenecho") (On Golica)
- Na Golici, na pomoč ("On Golica, Help!")
- Na Gorjušah ("In Gorjuše")
- Na Jezerskem ("In Jezersko")
- Na Kranjskem sejmu ("At the Kranj Fair")
- Na Krki sem ribce lovil ("I Fished in the Krka")
- Na Krvavcu ("On Krvavec")
- Na lovski veselici ("On the Hunter's Fete")
- Na Martinovo ("On St. Martin's Day")
- Na Menini planini ("On the Menina Pasture")
- Na mostu ("On the Bridge")
- Na oknu slonim ("I Lean on the Window")
- Na planinski magistrali ("On the Mountain Main Road")
- Na podeželju ("In the Country")
- Na podstrešju ("In the Attic")
- Na Poljški planini ("At Poljška Pasture")
- Na promenadi ("At the Promenade")
- Na Robleku ("On Roblek")
- Na sejmu ("At the Fair")
- Na smučarskem tečaju ("At the Ski Course")
- Na svidenje ("Goodbye")
- Na Šmarno goro ("To Mount Saint Mary")
- Na tebe pa požvižgam se ("I Don't Give a Hoot About You")
- Na valovih Jadrana ("On the Waves of the Adriatic Sea")
- Na vrtu mojega očeta ("In the Garden of My Father")
- Na Zbiljskem jezeru ("At Lake Zbilje")
- Na zdravje vsem ("Cheers to All")
- Na zdravje vsem ("Cheers to All")
- Na Zelenici ("At Zelenica [pasture]")
- Nabrala bom šopek cvetja ("I Will Pick up a Bouquet of Flowers")
- Najin tango ("Our Tango")
- Najina zvezda ("Our Star")
- Najlepše je doma ("It Is Most Beatuful at Home")
- Najlepši cvet ("The Most Beautiful Flower")
- Narodna noša ("The National Costume")
- Naš pozdrav ("Our Greeting")
- Naša žlahta ("Our Relatives")
- Našim znancem ("To Our Acquaintances")
- Ne maraj za težave ("Do not Care About Problems")
- Ne pozabi me ("Don't Forget Me")
- Ne sveti zvezda v noč svetleje ("The Star Doesn't Shine into the Night Brighter")
- Nedeljski izlet ("The Sunday Trip")
- Nemirna mlada leta ("The Restless Young Years")
- Nepozabni dnevi ("Unforgettable Days")
- Neprespane noči ("Sleepless Nights")
- Nežno šepetenje ("The Gentle Whisper")
- Ni važno od kod si doma ("It Doesn't Matter Where You Are from")
- Nikar domov ("On no Account Go Home")
- Nobena ni lepša kot moja ("None is more Beautiful than Mine")
- Nobena žavba ne pomaga več ("No Salve Doesn't Help Anymore")
- Noč diši po pravljici ("The Night Smells of a Fairytale")
- Novoletni koledar ("The New Year Calendar")
- Novoletno voščilo: Zvezde na nebu žare ("The New Year's Wish: The Stars Glow in the Sky")
- O, moj dragi ("Oh, My Dear One")
- O, sveti Florjan ("Oh, Saint Florian")
- Ob Dravi ("At the Drava")
- Ob jezeru ("At the Lake")
- Ob Ljubljanici ("At the Ljubljanica")
- Ob slapu ("At the Waterfall")
- Obisk na Koroškem ("The Visit in Carinthia")
- Obisk v Lipici ("The Visit in Lipica")
- Od Ljubljane do Maribora ("From Ljubljana to Maribor")
- Odmev s Triglava ("The Echo from Triglav")
- Oh ta žeja ("Oh, this Thirst")
- Ohcet na Borlu ("The Wedding at Borl [castle]")
- Okajeni godci ("The Tipsy Musicians")
- Okoli novega leta ("Around the New Year")
- Oleandrov cvet ("The Oleander Flower")
- Opravljivke ("The Gossipmongers")
- Otoček sredi jezera ("The Little Island in the Middle of the Lake")
- Otroške želje ("The Child's Wishes")
- Pa se sliš ("And It is Heard")
- Paradna polka ("The Parade Polka")
- Pastirček ("The Little Shepherd")
- Pesem o divjem petelinu ("The Capercaille Poem")
- Pesem v spomin ("The Poem to the Memory")
- Pijem rad in dobro jem ("I Like to Drink and Eat Well")
- Pisani travniki ("The Colourful Meadows")
- Planica, Planica
- Planinski cvet ("The Mountain Flower")
- Planinski valček ("The Mountain Waltz")
- Ples kurentov ("The Kurent Dance")
- Po cvetličnih tratah ("Across the Flower Meadows")
- Po cvetočih planinah ("Across the Flowering Mountains")
- Po klančku gor, po klančku dol ("Up the Little Slope, Down the Little Slope")
- Po trgatvi ("After the Grape Harvest")
- Počitnice na kmetih ("Holidays on the Farm")
- Pod cvetočimi kostanji ("Under the Flowering Chestnuts")
- Pod Dobrčo ("Below Dobrča")
- Pod lipco ("Under the Little Lime Tree")
- Pod ljubljanskim gradom ("Below Ljubljana Castle")
- Pod Špikom ("Below Špik")
- Pod Vitrancem ("Below Vitranc")
- Pod zvezdnatim nebom ("Under the Starry Sky")
- Pogled v dolino ("View into the Valley")
- Pogled z Jalovca ("View from Jalovec")
- Pohorski valček ("The Pohorje Waltz")
- Pojdi z menoj na planino ("Go with Me to the Pasture")
- Pokal - polka ("The Cup – The Polka")
- Poleti, pozimi ("In the Winter, in the Summer")
- Polka na Voglu ("The Vogel Polka")
- Polka ostane polka ("A Polka Remains a Polka")
- Polka za harmoniko ("The Accordion Polka")
- Polka za klarinet ("The Clarinet Polka")
- Polnočni zvonovi ("The Midnight Bells")
- Pomladi je lepo ("It Is Beautiful in the Spring")
- Pomladni nasmeh ("The Spring Smile")
- Ponočnjaki ("The Night Owls")
- Popolna zmeda ("The Complete Mess")
- Posedam rad pred hišico ("I Like to Sit in Front of my House")
- Poskočni klarineti ("The Lively Clarinets")
- Potepanje s harmoniko ("The Wandering with the Accordion")
- Povej mi, kje pomlad gostuje ("Tell me Where the Spring Guests")
- Pozdrav iz Kranjske gore ("The Greeting from Kranjska Gora")
- Pozdrav s Pohorja ("The Greeting from Pohorje")
- Pozdrav s trobento ("The Greeting with a Trumpet")
- Pozdrav Selški dolini ("The Greeting to the Selca Valley")
- Pozno jeseni ("In the Late Autumn")
- Praktično je le kolo ("Only a Bicycle is Practical")
- Prav fletno se imamo ("We're Really Groovy")
- Prava ljubezen ("The True Love")
- Praznik Gorenjske ("The Upper Carniola Feast")
- Praznik na vasi ("The Village Feast")
- Praznik pršuta in terana ("The Prosciutto and Terano Feast")
- Prehitro mimo je mladost ("The Youth Passes too Quickly")
- Prekmurska polka ("The Prekmurje Polka")
- Prelep je svet ("The Magnificent World")
- Prelepa Gorenjska ("The Magnificent Upper Carniola")
- Prelepa zelena Begunjščica ("The Magnificent Green Begunjščica")
- Prelepi gorenjski cvet ("The Magnificent Mountain Flower")
- Prelepi zimski čas ("The Magnificent Winter Time")
- Premišljevanje ("The Contemplation")
- Pri Jožovcu ("At Jožovc's")
- Pri Matuču ("At Matuč's")
- Pri nas doma ("At Our Home")
- Pri sankaški koči ("At the Sled Rider's Lodge")
- Pri sedmerih jezerih ("At the Seven Lakes")
- Pri Valvazorjevi koči ("At Valvasor Lodge")
- Prijateljem harmonike ("To the Friends of the Accordion")
- Prijatelji, ostanimo prijatelji ("Friends, Let Stay Friends")
- Proti jutru ("Towards the Morning")
- Prvi sončni žarek ("The First Sunray")
- Pustni valček ("The Shrovetide Waltz")
- Pustovanje na Gorenjskem ("The Shrovetide Celebration in Upper Carniola")
- Radovedni astronavt Franc ("The Curious Astronaut Franc")
- Rana ura, huda ura ("Early Hour, Angry Hour")
- Resje že cvete ("The Heather Is Already in Flower")
- Rezka
- Romanca za kitaro ("The Guitar Romance")
- Rosno mladi smo mi junaki bili nekoč ("Some Day We the Heroes Were in the First Flush of Youth")
- S čolnom po Ljubljanici ("With a Boat on the Ljubljanica")
- S harmoniko v hribe ("With the Accordion to the Hills")
- S kitaro po svetu ("With the Guitar Across the World")
- S kočijo v Bodešče ("With a Carriage to Bodešče")
- S pesmijo našo ("With Our Song")
- S polko v novo leto ("With a Polka to the New Year")
- S trobento v svet ("With the Trumpet into the World")
- Samo enkrat imaš 50 let ("You're 50 Only Once")
- Samo enkrat se živi ("You Only Live Once")
- Samo še en vrček ("Only a Single Jug More")
- Sanjam o domovini ("I Dream About my Homeland")
- Sem deklica za vse ("I'm A General Dogsbody")
- Sem ter tja ("To and Fro")
- Shujševalna kura ("The Diet")
- Shujševalna kura, nevaren pivski napotek ("The Diet, a Dangerous Drinking Advice")
- Silvestrski večer, mali zidarski napotek ("The New Year's Eve, the Little Building Advice")
- Sinje morje, bela jadra ("The Blue Sea, the White Sails")
- Skozi Tuhinjsko dolino ("Through the Tuhinj Valley")
- Slalom polka ("The Slalom Polka")
- Slovenija, od kod lepote tvoje ("Slovenia, Where Your Beauties Are From")
- Slovenski pozdravi ("The Slovene Greetings")
- Spomin ("The Memory")
- Stara polka ("The Old Polka")
- Tudi ti nekoč boš mamica postala ("You Will Become a Mummy One Day Too")
- Veter nosi pesem mojo ("The Wind Bears My Song")
- Za konec tedna ("For the End of the Week")
- Za kratek čas ("Lustig mit Gitare und Accordeon") ("For the Short Time")
- Zinka, Zefka, Zofka
