= Zitzmann =

Zitzmann is a German surname. Notable people with the surname include:

- Axel Zitzmann (born 1959), East German ski jumper
- Billy Zitzmann (1895–1985), American baseball player
