= Planica, Planica =

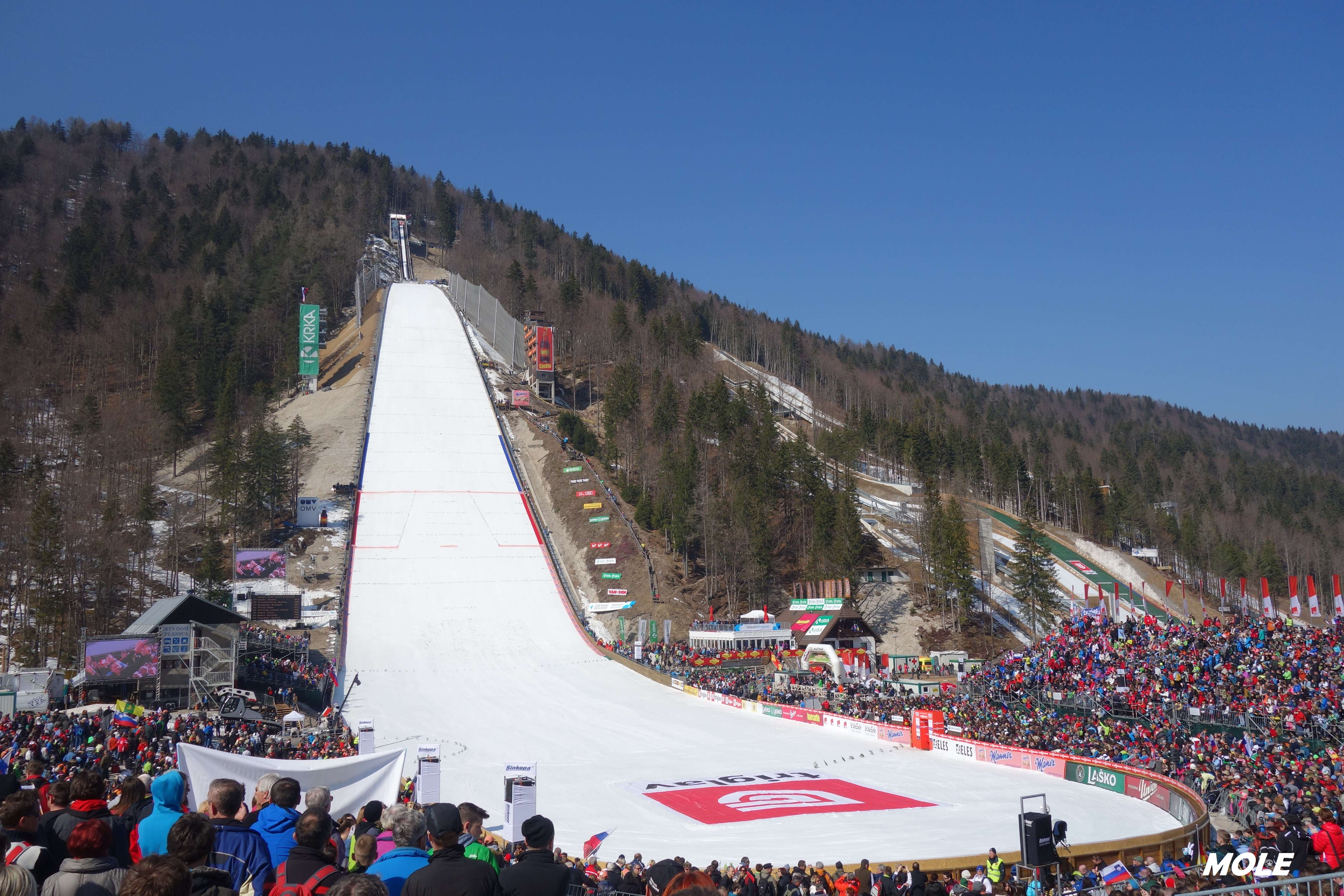

Song by Ansambel bratov Avsenik

from the album Frochloche stunden mit music/Vesele urice
- Released: 15 March 1979 (5th Ski Flying World Championships)
- Genre: folk, polka
- Length: 2:45
- Composers: Slavko Avsenik; Vilko Ovsenik
- Lyricist: Marjan Stare

Music video
- Planica, Planica on YouTube

"Planica, Planica" is a 1979 Slovenian polka song performed by Ansambel bratov Avsenik (Slavko Avsenik Und Seine Original Oberkrainer). This song was Slavko Avsenik's tribute to Planica.

== Background ==
Music was written by Slavko Avsenik, lyrics written by Marjan Stare and arranged by Slavko's brother Vilko Ovsenik. Original voice was contributed by three vocals in the band at that time: Ema Prodnik, Jožica Svete and Alfi Nipič. Song world premiered at opening of 5th FIS Ski Flying World Championships on 15 March 1979 when band performed in the rain on the stage under RTV dom next to famous flying hill Letalnica bratov Gorišek. The main chorus »Planica, Planica, snežena kraljica« (Planica, Planica, snow queen) is played every time someone jumps further than 230 meters. In 1979 it was first time released on »Frochloche stunden mit music« in Germany. A year later song was first released in Slovenia on »Vesele urice«.

== Tribute to Planica ==
From 1946 to 1952 Slavko Avsenik was a national team ski jumper. But then he injured and became a musician. In 1948 he set his personal record of 74 m (243 ft) in Planica at Srednja Bloudkova (K80). Slavko was always big fan of ski jumping and especially of Planica to whom he was very emotionally attached. That's why he decided to write this song as a tribute to Planica. He was even funding renovations of Planica in the past.

== Personnel ==
- Slavko Avsenik - music, accordion
- Marjan Stare - lyrics
- Vilko Ovsenik - arrangement
- Lev Ponikvar - guitar
- Franc Košir - trumpet
- Mik Soss - baritone horn
- Albin Rudan - clarinet
- Alfi Nipič - vocal
- Ema Prodnik - vocal
- Jožica Svete - vocal

== Lyrics ==
The following provides the original Slovene text of »Planica, Planica« by Marjan Stare and its literal translation in English.

1.
Planica, Planica	Planica, Planica
snežena kraljica!	oh snowy queen!
2.
Planica, Planica	Planica, Planica
snežena kraljica!	oh snowy queen!
Le kdo je ne pozna	Who does not know her
lepoto iz snega?	this beauty made of snow?
3.
Skakalci kot ptice	Ski jumpers like birds
letijo pod nebo	soar through the sky
in slavo Planice	the glory of Planica
v širni svet neso	they carry into the wide world
4.
Pozdrav neustrašnim junakom daljav,	A salute to the fearless heroes of the spans,
prijateljev strmih snežnih planjav!	friends of the precipitous snowy plains!
Slava, čast velja	Fame and honour are due
vsem skakalcem tega sveta!	to all ski jumpers of this world!
5.
Junaki Planice	The heroes of Planica
letijo kot ptice,	soar like birds,
spet slava gre v svet	again glory marches into the world
za dolgo vrsto let!	for years in a row!
6.
Planica, Planica,	Planica, Planica,
še pridemo nazaj,	we shall soon return,
v Planico, Planico,	to Planica, Planica,
pod Ponce v zimski raj!	to the winter paradise beneath the Ponce!
