= Sundgaard =

Sundgaard is a surname. Notable people with the surname include:

- Arnold Sundgaard (1909–2006), American playwright, librettist, and lyricist
- Kip Sundgaard (born 1956), American ski jumper
