= Thomas Prosser =

Thomas Prosser may refer to:

- Thomas Prosser, slaveholder of Gabriel Prosser of Gabriel's Rebellion
- Thomas Prosser (architect) (1817–1888), company architect of the North Eastern Railway Company
- Thomas Prosser (ski jumper) (born 1960), West German ski jumper
