= Josef Samek =

Czech ski jumper (born 1957)

Josef Samek (born 6 November 1957 in Vrchlabí) is a Czech former ski jumper who competed for Czechoslovakia from 1977 to 1984. His lone victory was in Garmisch-Partenkirchen during the 1978–79 Four Hills Tournament.

At the 1980 Winter Olympics in Lake Placid, Samek finished 23rd in the individual large hill and 39th in the individual normal hill events. He finished 14th in the individual normal hill and 23rd in the individual large hill events at the FIS Nordic World Ski Championships 1982 in Oslo. Samek also finished fifth at the FIS Ski-Flying World Championships 1979 in Planica.
