= Križaj =

Križaj is a surname. Notable people with the surname include:

- Bojan Križaj (born 1957), Slovenian and Yugoslavian alpine skier
- Domen Križaj (born 1989), Slovenian baritone
- Izabela Križaj, Slovenian footballer
- Josip Križaj (disambiguation), multiple people
- Andrej Križaj (born 1986), Slovenian alpine skier
