= Kacenštajn Castle =

- Slovenia
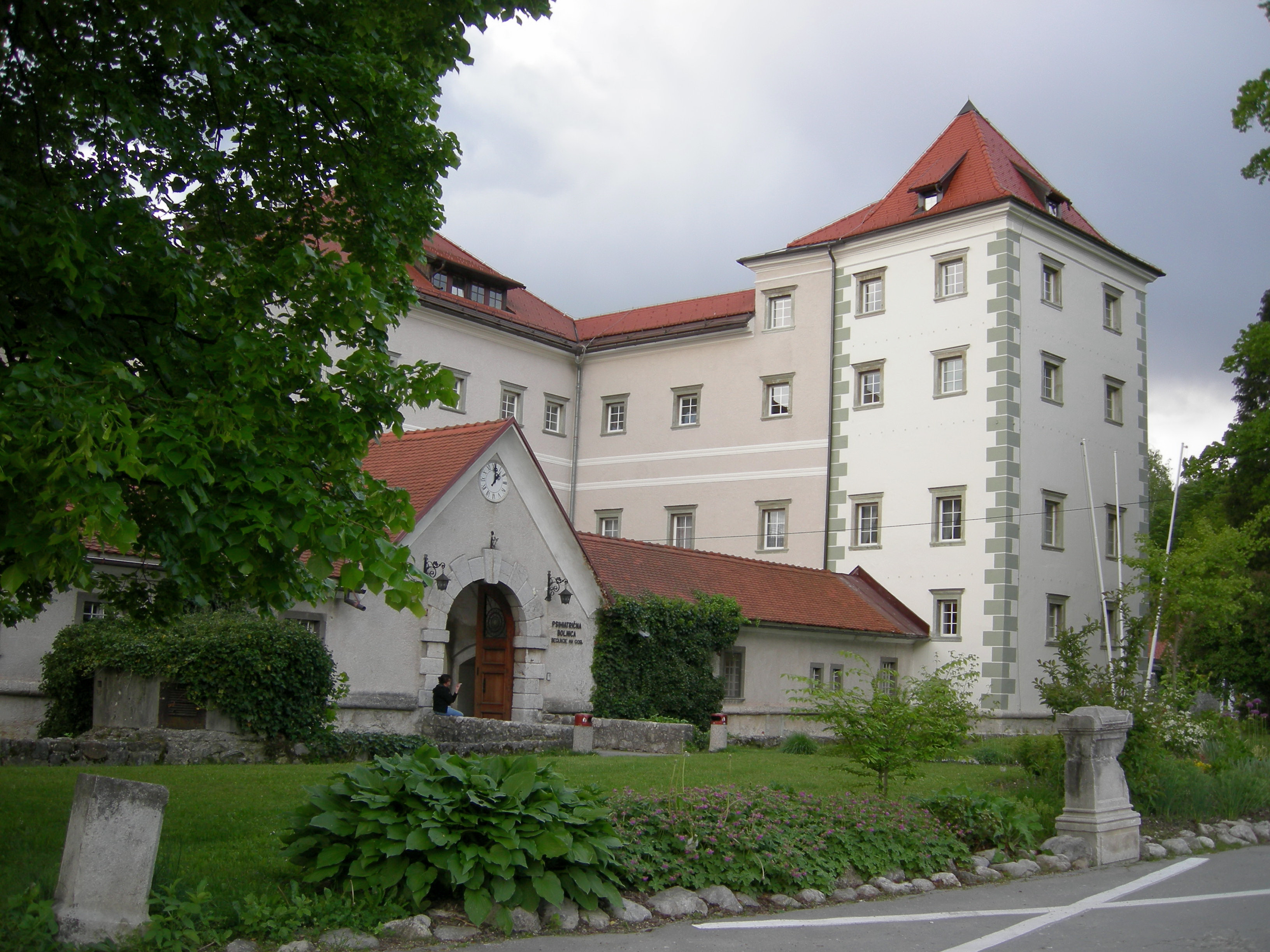
- Kacenštajn Castle, Begunje

Location
- Coordinates: 46.3756°N 14.198°E

Site history
- Materials: Limestone

Kacenštajn Castle (Slovene: Grad Kacenštajn, German: Burg Katzenstein) comprises, together with St. Ursula's Church, the old center of the village of Begunje in the Upper Carniola region of Slovenia.

== History ==
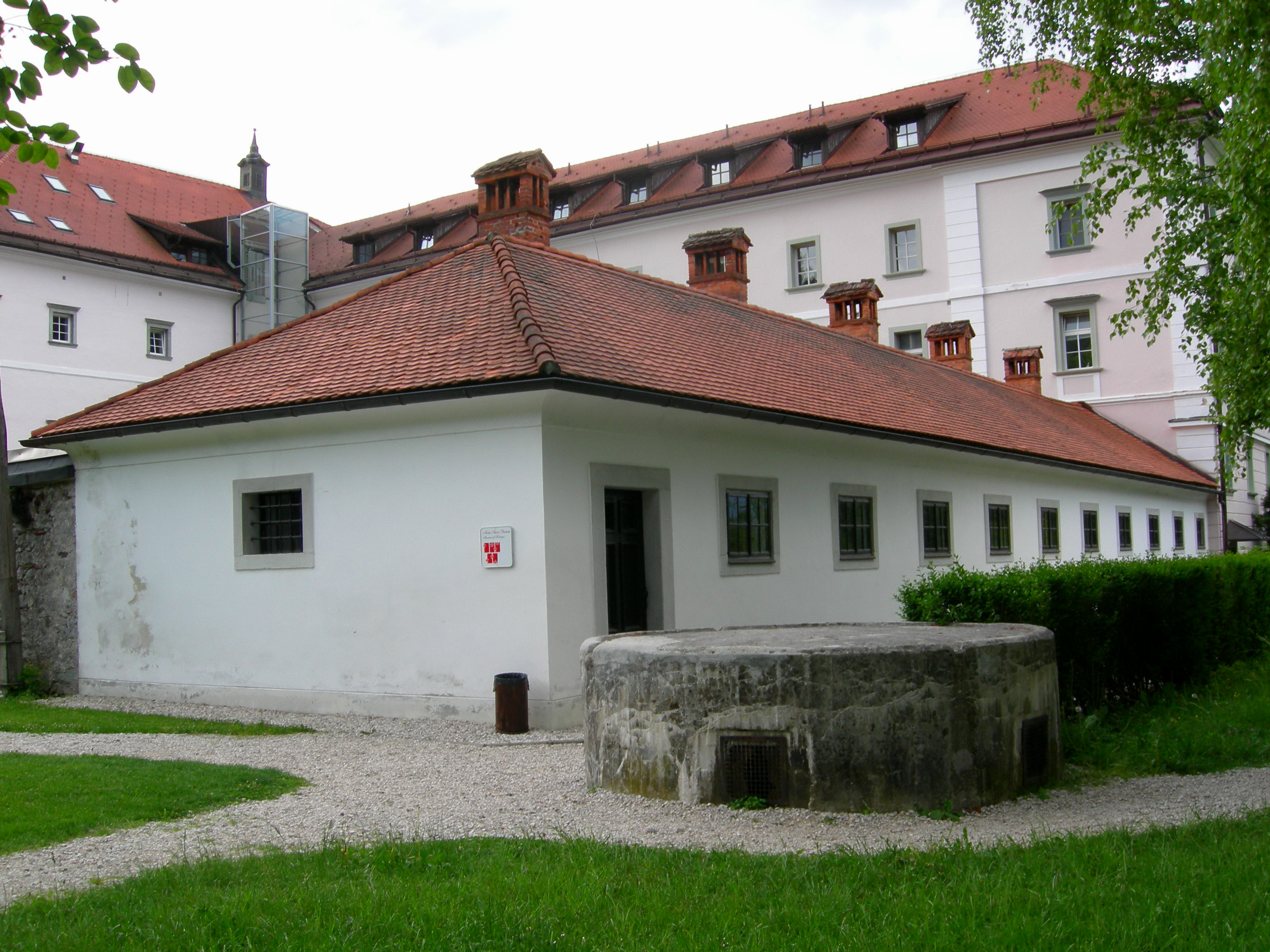
Hostage Museum

The castle was first mentioned in historical documents in 1428. The noble house of Katzen (locally known as Kacijanarji) rebuilt it in the 16th century, but it took its final shape a century later, when the Counts of Lamberg moved to it from Kamen Castle.

The original two-story core of the castle survives inside newer additions, as do remnants of its Gothic architecture. The majority of the present structure dates from its Renaissance and Baroque rebuildings, and the southeast wing was added in the 19th century.

The layout of the castle's Baroque garden remains, although the grounds are now occupied by a vegetable garden. The 140 m avenue leading to the manor is bordered with mature chestnuts.

Before the Second World War, the manor served as a women's penitentiary, operated by the Sisters of St. Vincent de Paul. In 1940, a pavilion was built in the park according to a concept by the Slovenian architect Jože Plečnik. During World War II the manor became a Gestapo prison, through which more than 11,500 prisoners passed; the grounds contain a mass grave holding the majority of the 849 detainees murdered there. Part of the manor building houses a Hostage Museum chronicling these events; the rest of it houses a psychiatric hospital.
