= Chris McNeill =

American ski jumper

Chris McNeill (20 November 1954 – 5 February 2011) was an American ski jumper who competed in the 1980 Winter Olympics.
