= Yury Ivanov (ski jumper) =

Soviet ski jumper

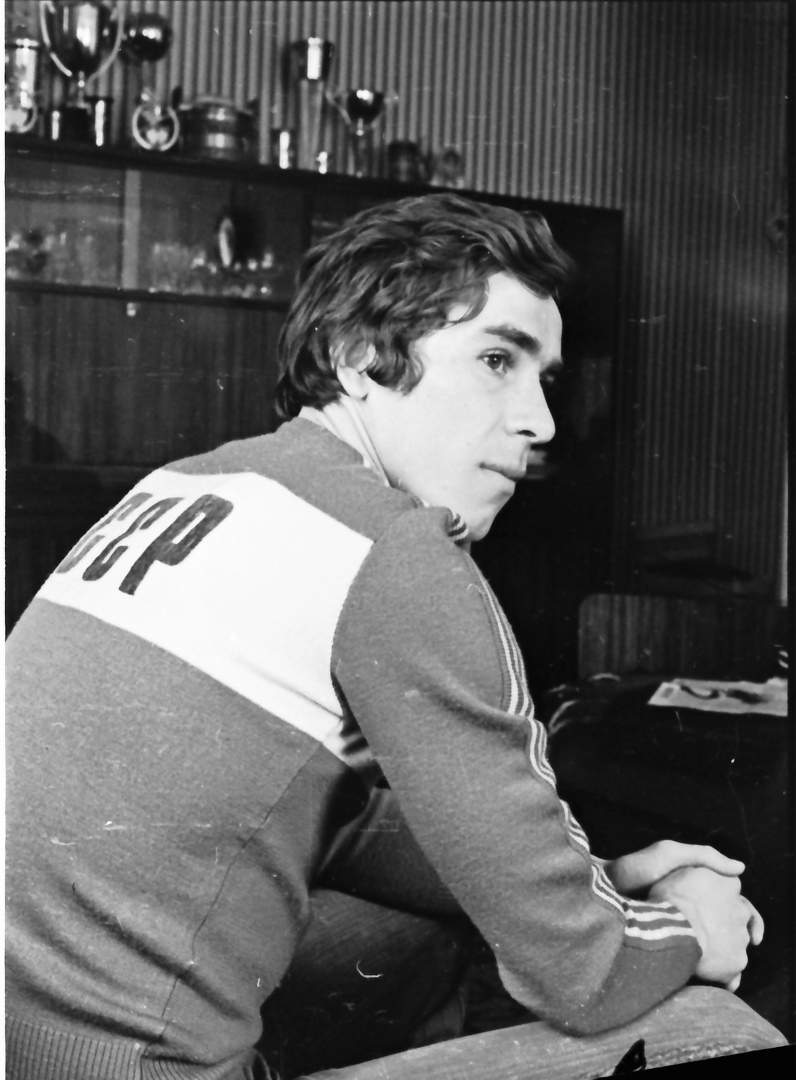

Personal information
- Nationality: Soviet
- Born: 9 July 1952 (age 72); Sortavala, Russian SFSR, Soviet Union

Sport
- Sport: Ski jumping

Yury Ivanov (born 9 July 1952) is a Soviet ski jumper. He competed in the normal hill and large hill events at the 1980 Winter Olympics.
