= Leoš Škoda =

Czech ski jumper

Personal information
- Nationality: Czech
- Born: 1 May 1953 (age 72); Liberec, Czechoslovakia

Sport
- Sport: Ski jumping

Leoš Škoda (born 1 May 1953) is a Czech ski jumper. He competed at the 1972 Winter Olympics and the 1980 Winter Olympics.
