= Begunje na Gorenjskem =

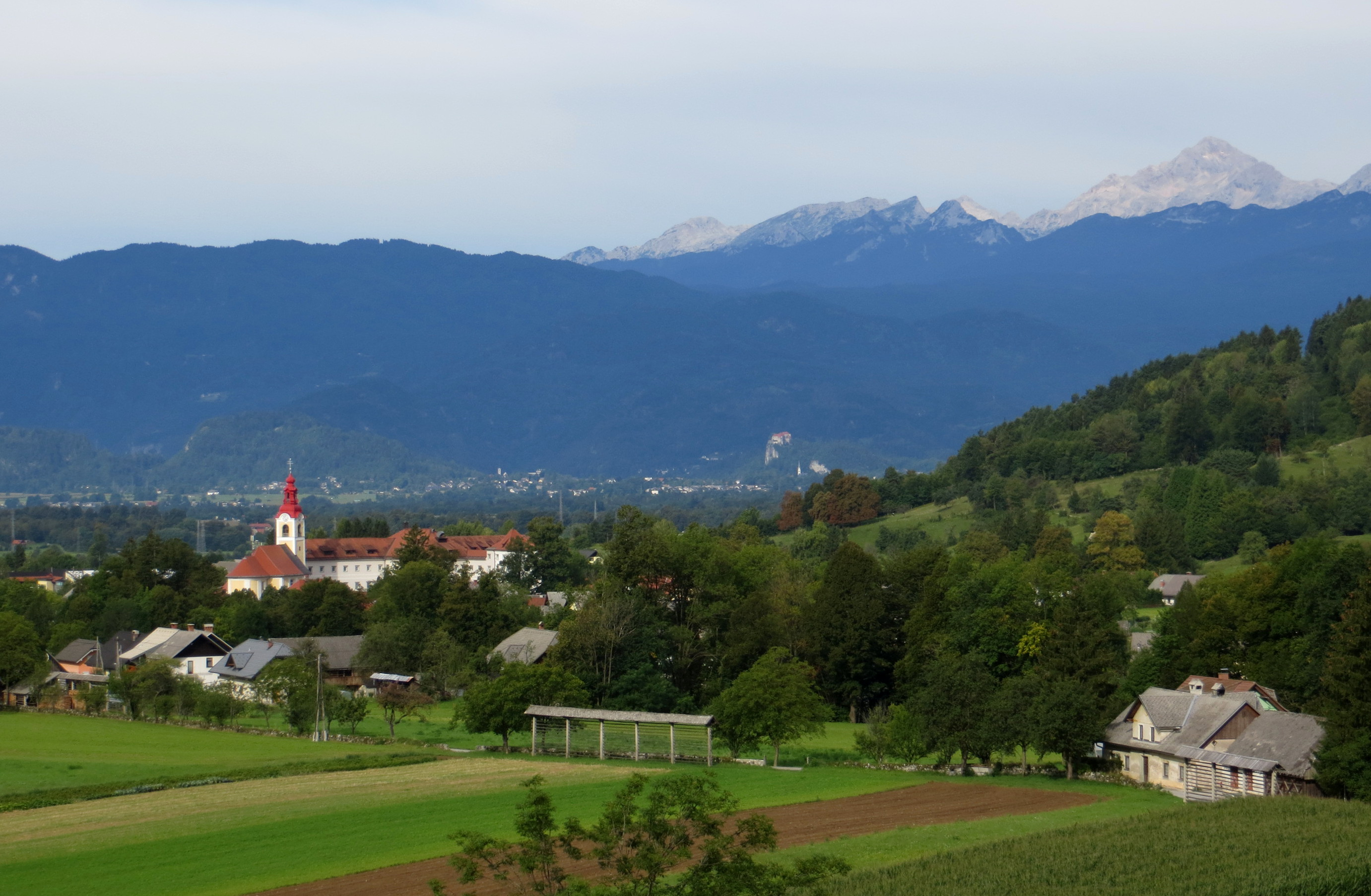

- Location in Slovenia
- Coordinates: 46°22′34.94″N 14°12′4.34″E
- Country: Slovenia
- Traditional region: Upper Carniola
- Statistical region: Upper Carniola
- Municipality: Radovljica

Area
  - Total: 18.6 km^{2} (7.2 sq mi)
- Elevation: 577.6 m (1,895 ft)

Population (2025)
  - Total: 992

Begunje na Gorenjskem (pronounced [ˈbeːɡunjɛ na ɡɔˈɾeːnskɛm]; German: Vigaun) is a village in the Municipality of Radovljica in the Upper Carniola region of Slovenia. It is known for being the location of the headquarters of the Elan Line company.

== Name ==
Begunje na Gorenjskem was first attested in written sources in 1050 as Begûn and in 1063 as Uegun, among various other spellings. The name of the settlement is derived from the personal name *Běgunъ, probably as a clipped version of *Běgun'e (selo) 'Běgunъ's village' (i.e., a neuter singular form) that later shifted to a feminine plural form. In Slovene, the settlement was originally simply called Begunje but the modifier na Gorenjskem 'in Upper Carniola' was later added to distinguish it from Begunje pri Cerknici (literally, 'Begunje near Cerknica'). In older sources, the settlement was sometimes named Begunje pri Lescah (German: Vigaun bei Lees)—that is, 'Begunje near Lesce', which also corresponded to the parish name.

== History ==
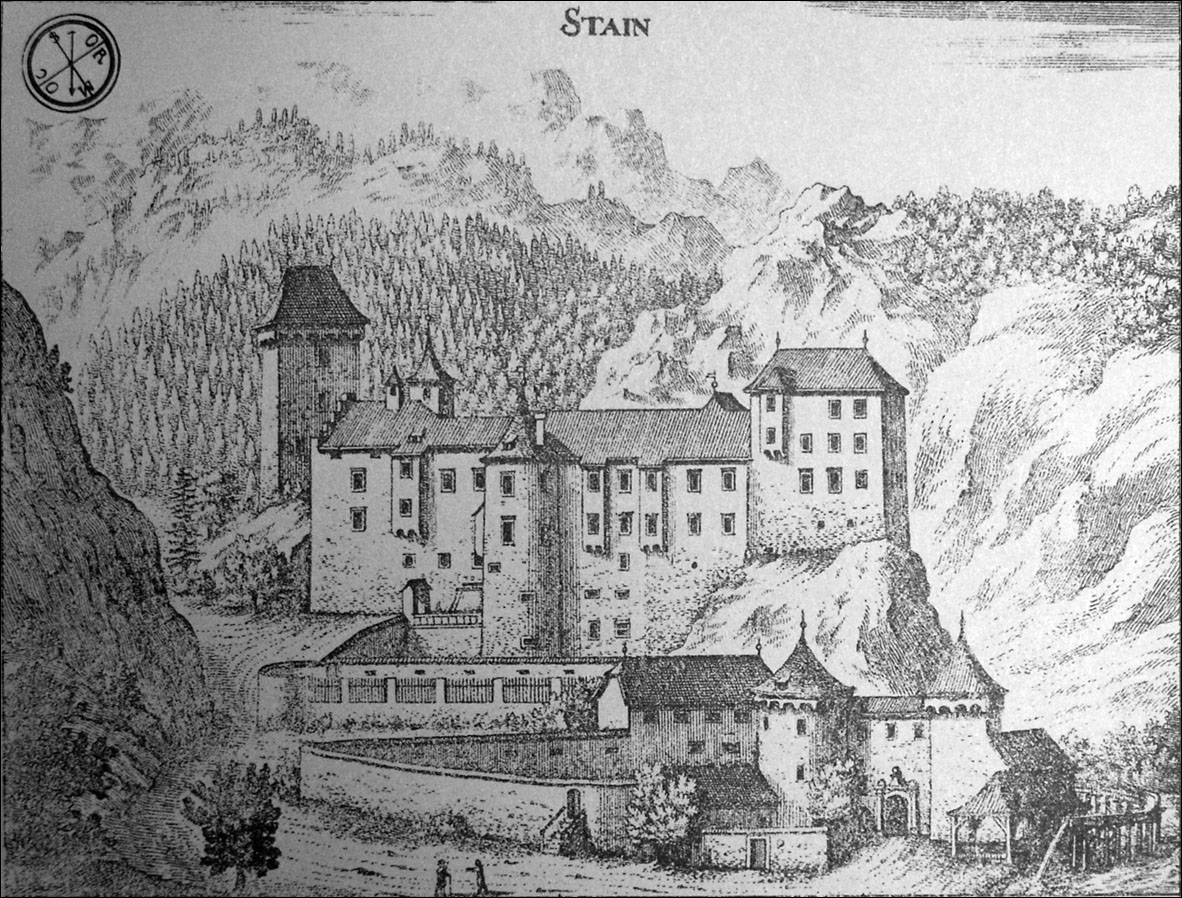
Stain, engraving by Johann Weikhard von Valvasor, 1689

The ruins of 12th-century Kamen (German: Stein or Stain) Castle are just outside the village in the Draga Valley. First documented in 1185, it appeared as Castrum Lapis in 1263 and Stain in 1350, when it passed into the Carniolan possessions of the Counts of Ortenburg. The castle played a vital role in protecting the comital lands in the Bohinj and Upper Sava Valley. When the Ortenburgs became extinct in 1418, it passed to Count Hermann II of Celje and was inherited by the Austrian House of Habsburg in 1456.

Fifteenth-century Kacenštajn Castle, rebuilt in the late 17th century, stands in the centre of the village. The castle was used as women's prison in the Kingdom of Yugoslavia, and it was seized as Upper Carniolan headquarters of the Nazi German Gestapo during the war. After the war, a Yugoslav labor camp for political prisoners operated in the village. A memorial and a museum dedicated to the victims were set up in part of the building, which today houses a psychiatric hospital accepting patients from all over the Upper Carniola region.

=== Mass graves ===
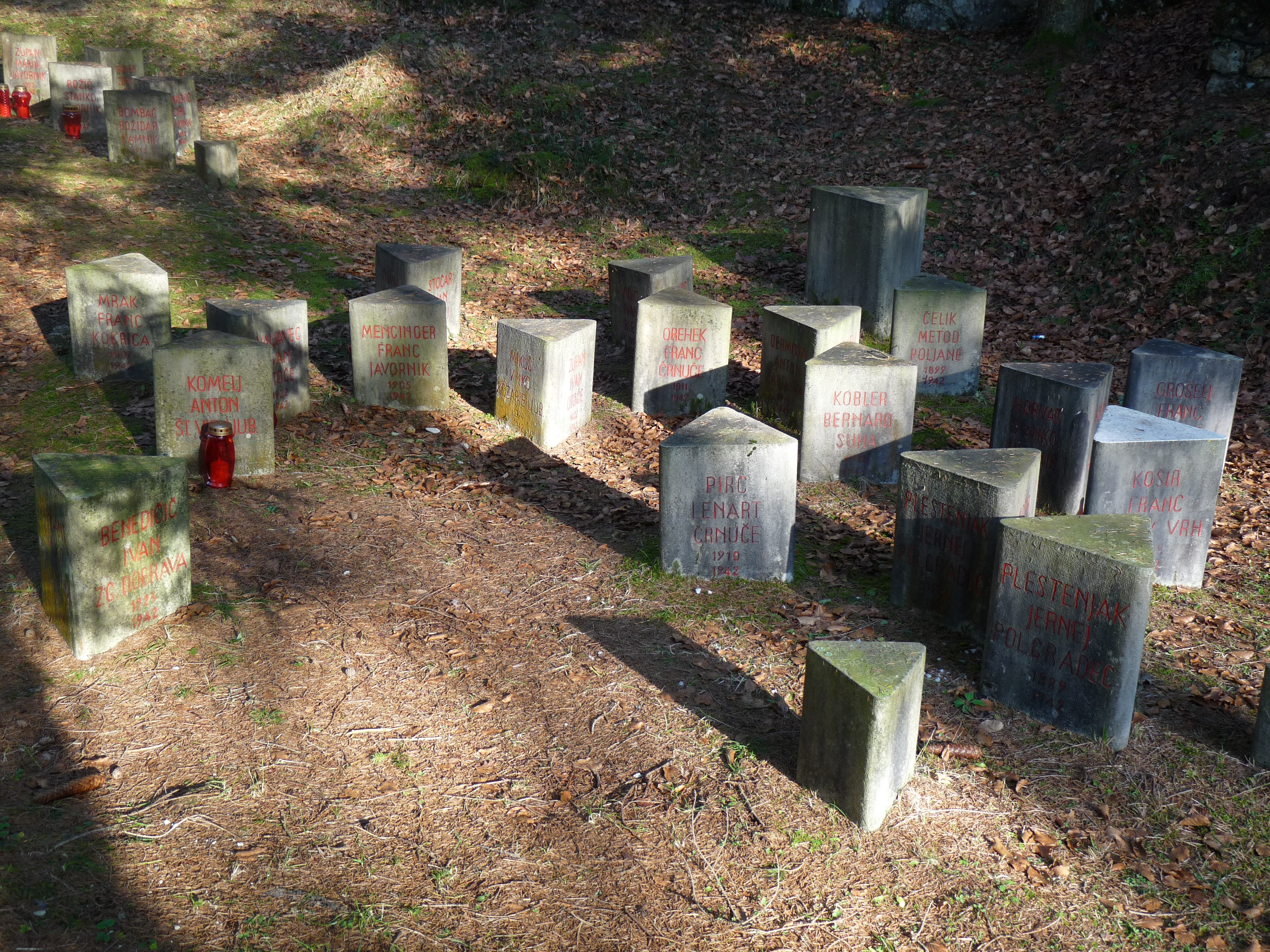
Mass Grave in the Draga Valley

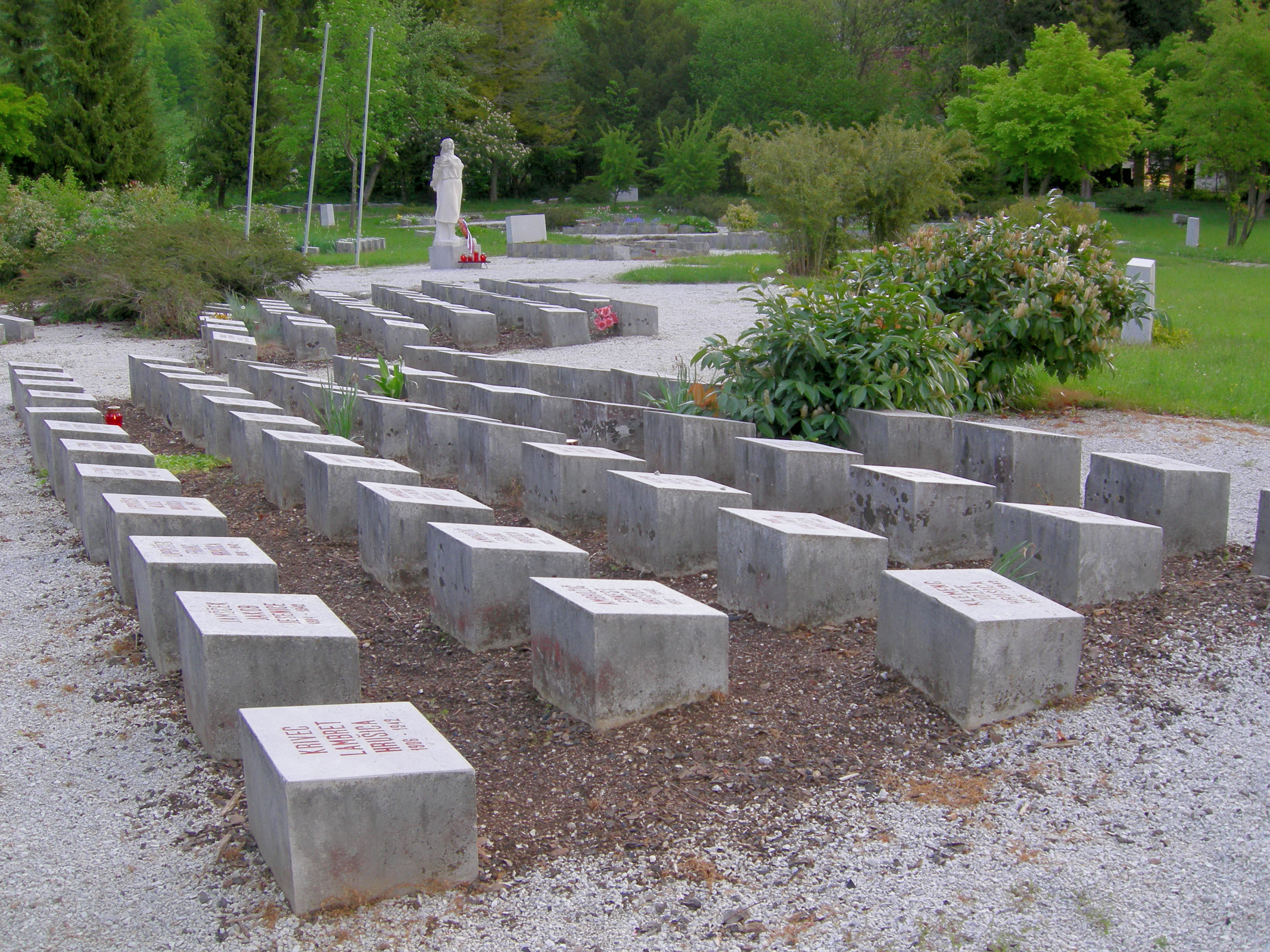
Mass grave in Begunje Castle park

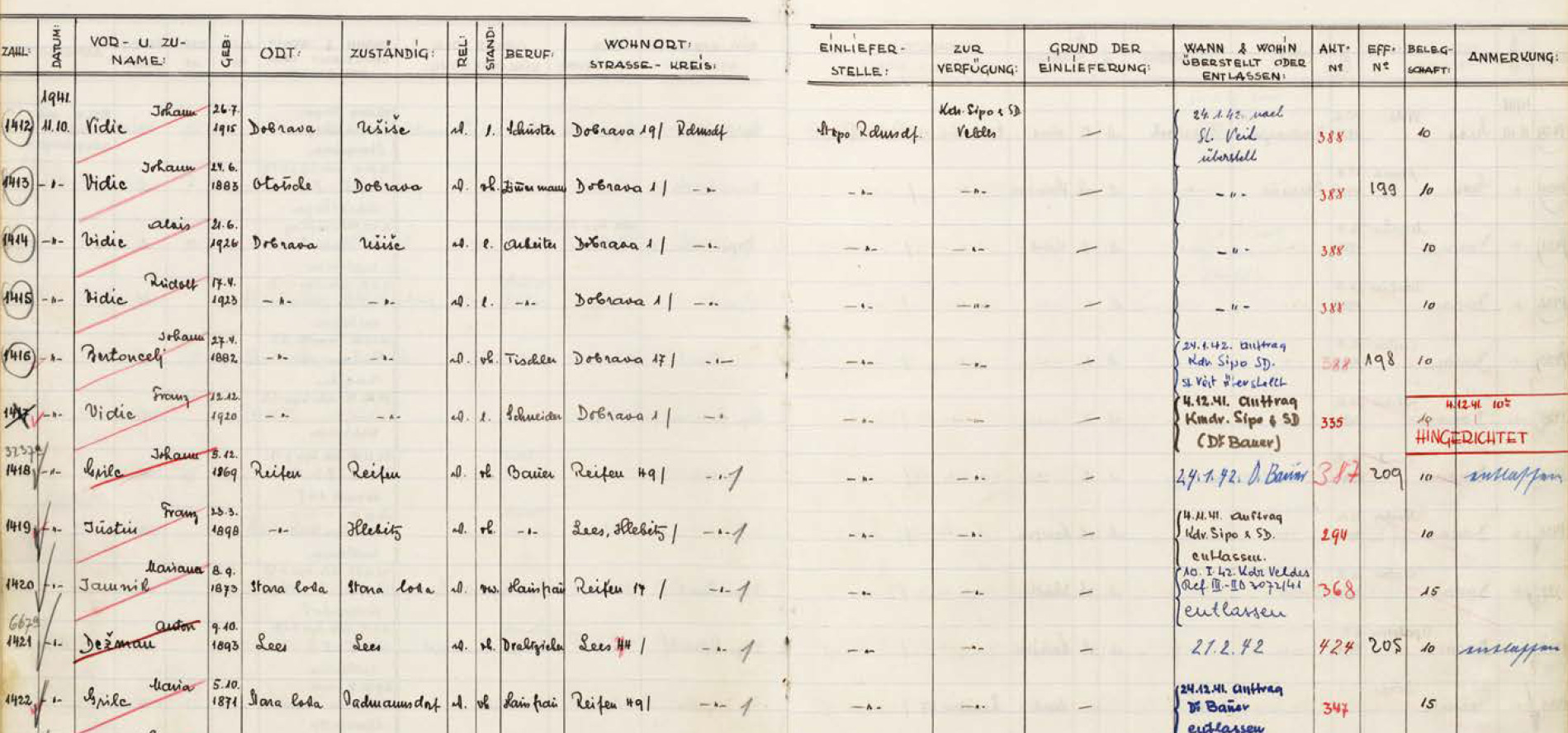
List of inmates in Begunje Gestapo prison

Begunje na Gorenjskem is the site of several mass graves from during and after the Second World War. During the war, the Germans held 11,477 hostages at Kacenštajn Castle; 849 inmates were killed, and 5183 were deported to Nazi concentration camps such as Mauthausen. Mass graves of tortured and shot Slovenes are located in the castle park and in the Draga Valley 1.6 kilometers (0.99 mi) to the east.

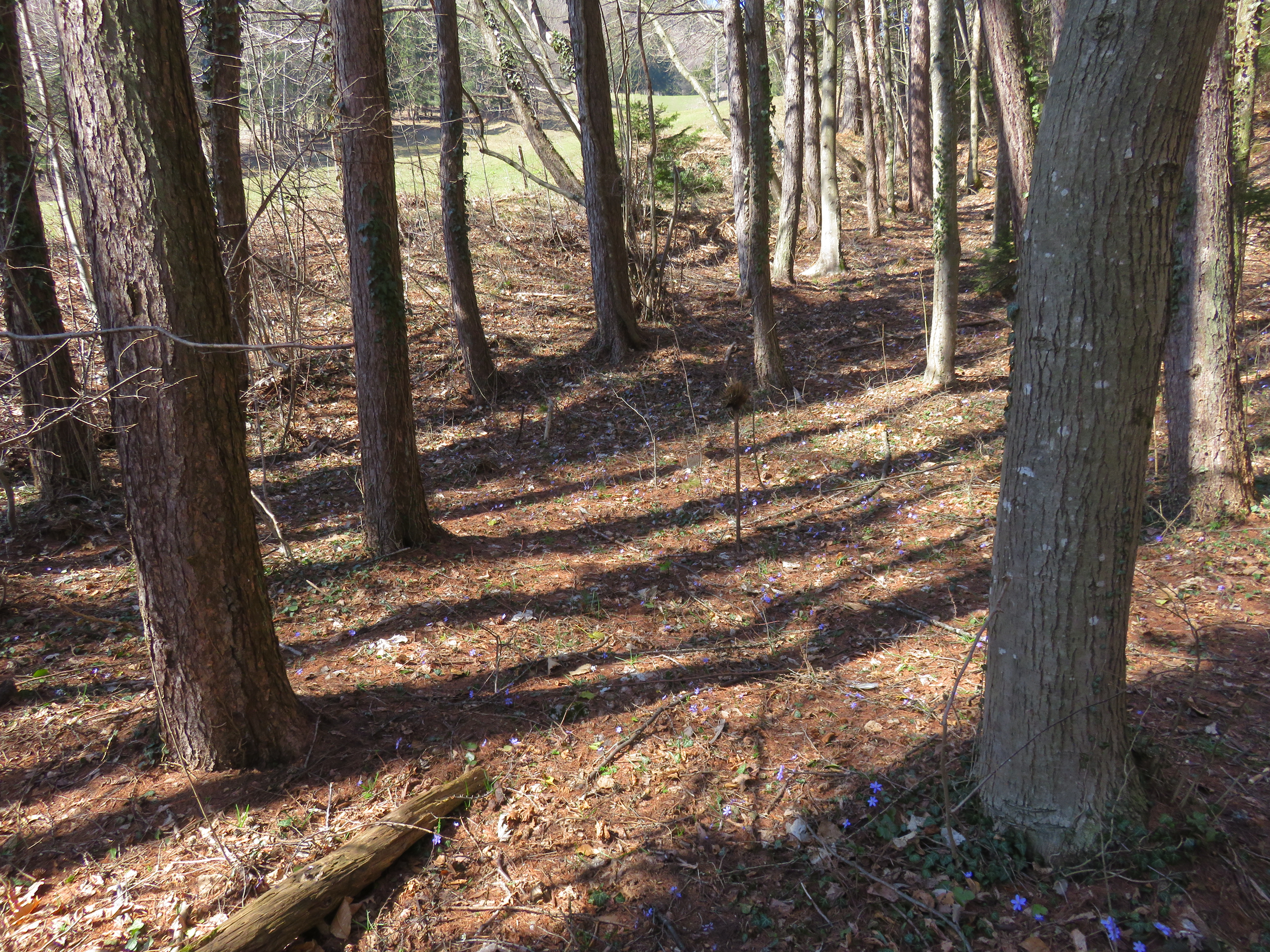
Krpin Ski Slope 1 Mass Grave

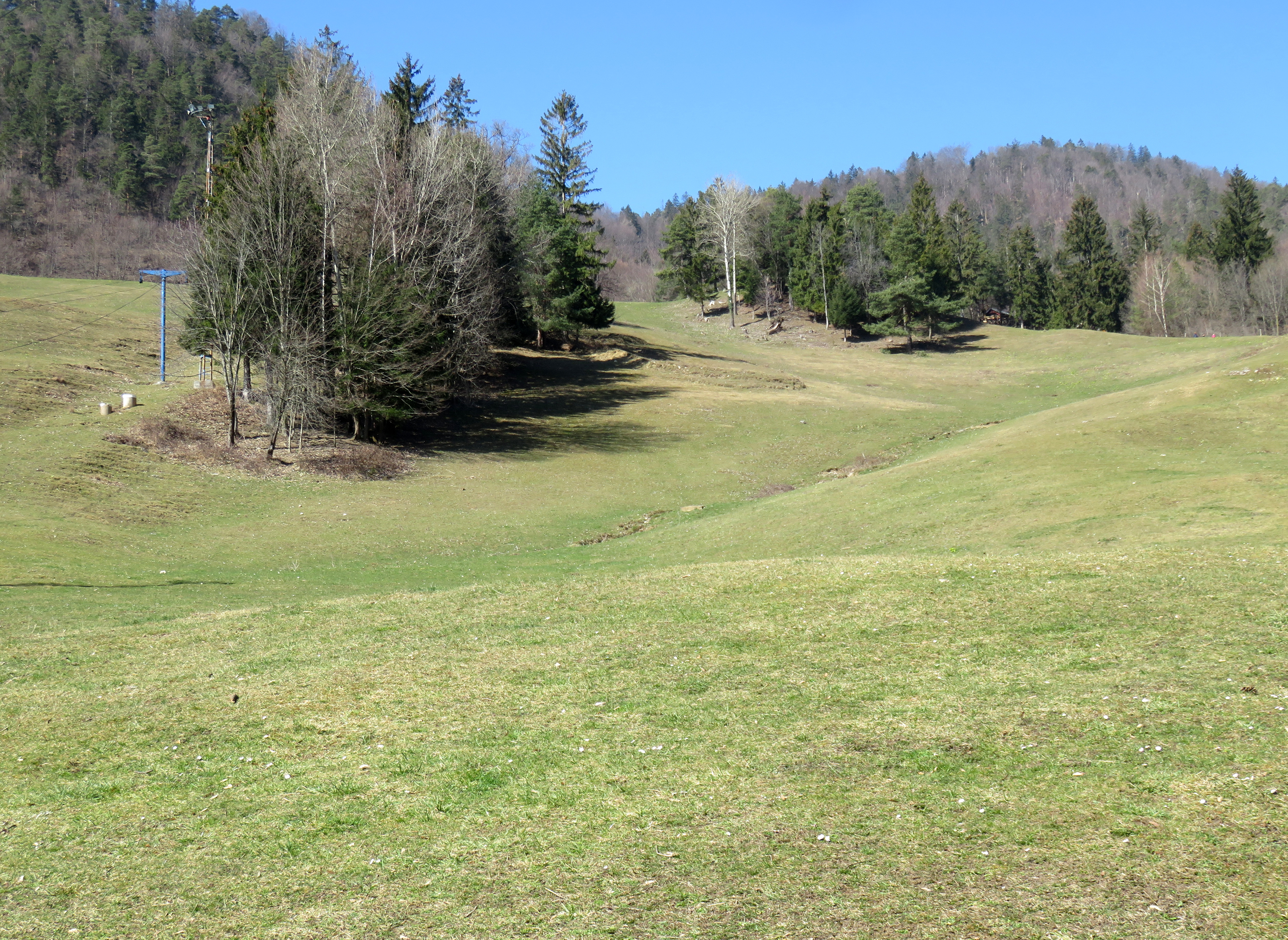
Krpin Ski Slope 3 Mass Grave

Unmarked postwar mass graves

Immediately after the Second World War, six known mass graves were created as a result of executions by the communists. The Krpin Gravel Pit 1 and 2 mass graves (Slovene: Grobišče peskokop Krpin 1, 2) are located north of the settlement; the first is in the bushes a few meters above the paved road, between a gravel pit and a dirt road, and the second is a few dozen meters higher, on a slope to the left of the path. The graves contain the remains of at least 20 Russian Liberation Army prisoners of war and civilians that were murdered at the end of June or beginning of July 1945. The Krpin Ski Slope 1–3 mass graves (Grobišče smučišče Krpin 1–3) are located north of the settlement; the first and second are in a picnic area behind a shed, and the third is on level ground behind the ski slope. The graves contain the remains of Russian Liberation Army prisoners of war and civilians murdered at two locations in the nearby gravel pit. The Mazevec Crevasse Mass Grave (Grobišče Mazevčev pruh) is located north of Kamen Castle, on the edge of a quarry below a large spruce tree, and is 10 m long. It contains the remains of German prisoners of war from Begunje and probably also civilian victims murdered on May 29, 1945.

== Church ==
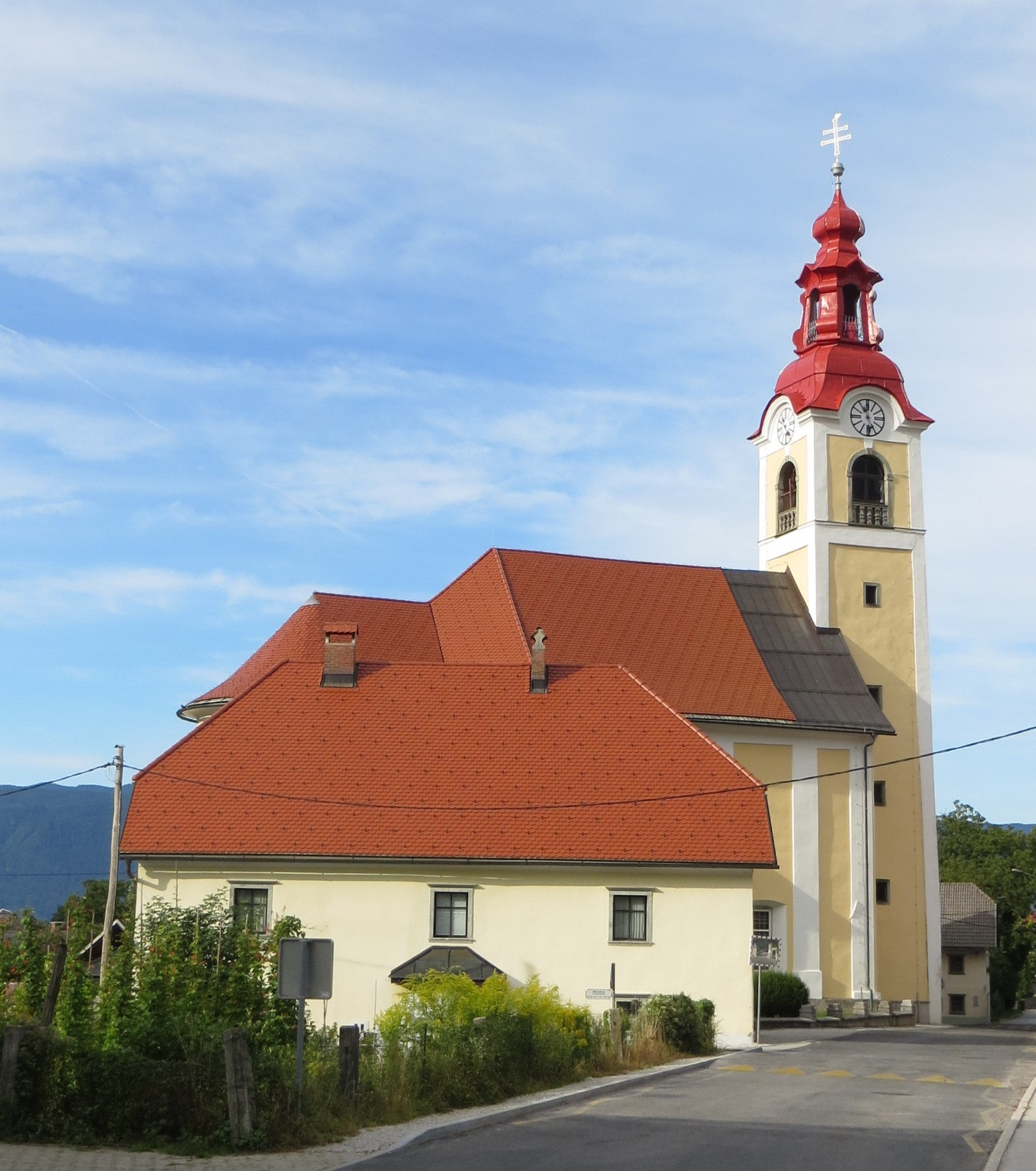
Saint Ulrich's Church

The parish church in Begunje na Gorenjskem is dedicated to Saint Ulrich. It is a Baroque structure that was built from 1740 to 1743. It has a cupola vault, a bell tower centered with the front side of the church, and furnishings created by Leopold Layer (1752–1828) and Janez Vurnik (1849–1911). The interior was painted by Matija Bradaška (1852–1915) in 1894 and 1897. The side altar dedicated to the Virgin Mary was taken from Kacenštajn Castle.

== Cultural heritage ==
A number of plaques and monuments memorialize the Partisan resistance and victims during the Second World War in Begunje:

- Plaque to 46 local victims of the Second World War
- Monument to six hostages shot on August 20, 1941
- Monument to Rudolf Gašperin, shot on May 7, 1944
- Monument to 20 hostages shot on July 7, 1943
- Monument to 13 Partisans killed in the battle on January 27–28, 1945
- Monument to the Partisan courier Štefan Erman, killed on November 7, 1944
- Bronze sculpture of a hostage at the graveyard of 188 executed hostages
- Reorganization of the Kokra Detachment in Draga, August 24, 1944
- Bronze sculpture of a chained hostage in Kacenštajn Castle
- Metal sculpture to the Sinti Romani victims of Nazi genocide
- The bell that announced the liberation of the prisoners on May 4, 1945
- Memorial park to the 457 buried hostages, with stone and bronze sculptures

== Notable people ==
Notable people that were born or lived in Begunje na Gorenjskem include:

- Slavko Avsenik (1929–2015), composer and musician
- Anton Bonaventura Jeglič (1850–1936), bishop of Ljubljana
- Jakob Prešern (1888–1975), writer

== Gallery ==
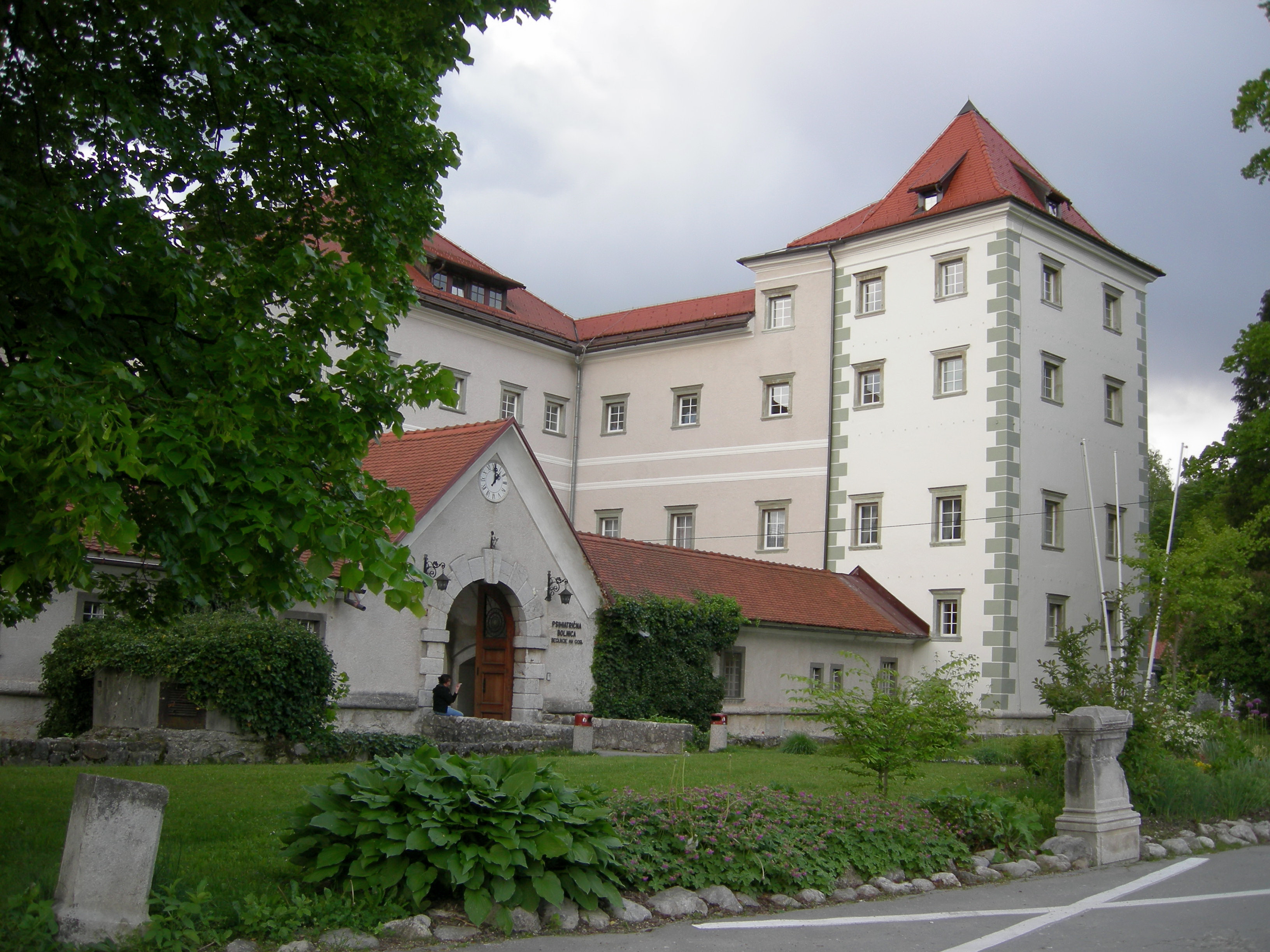
Katzenstein mansion

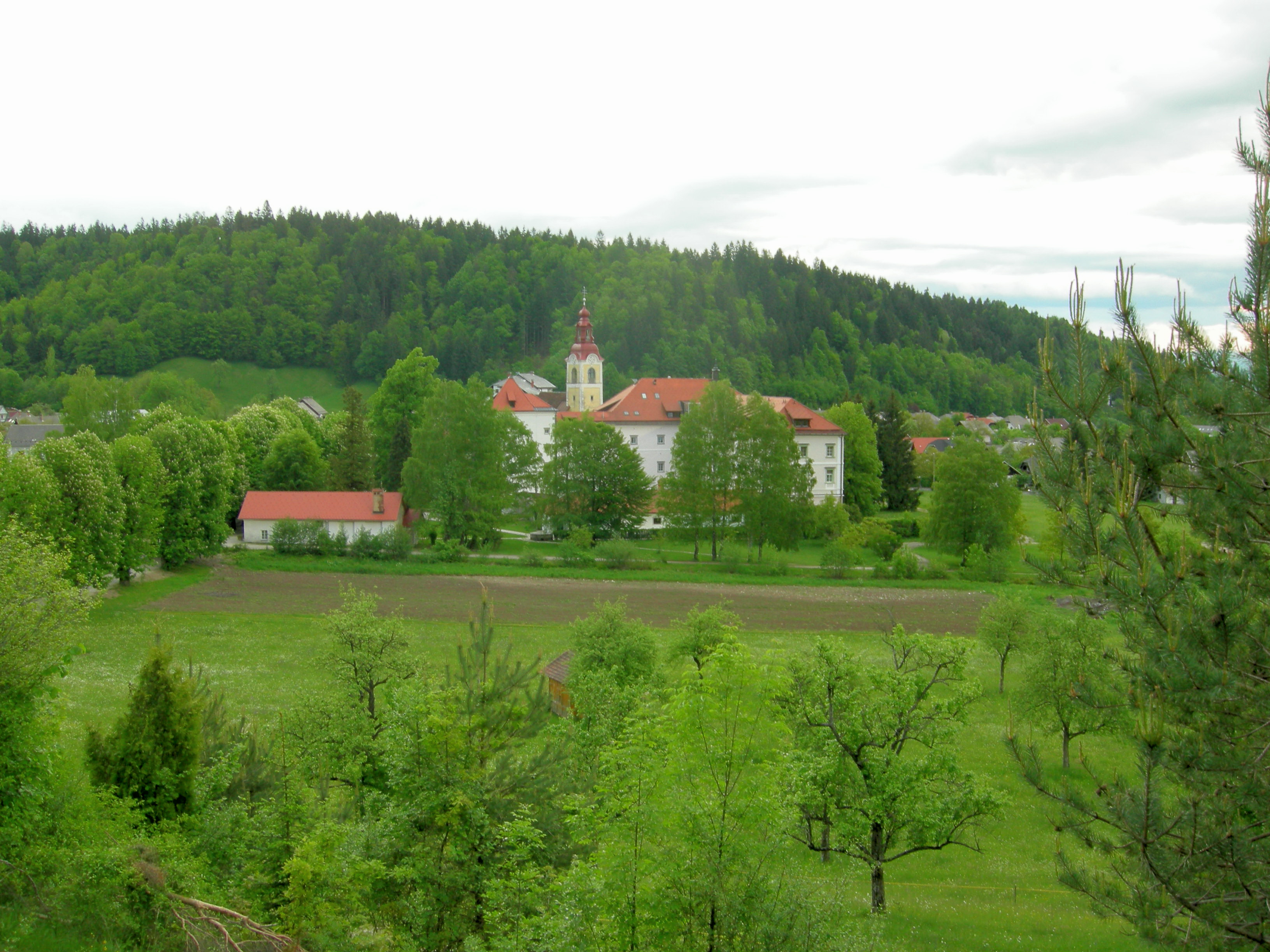
Katzenstein mansion

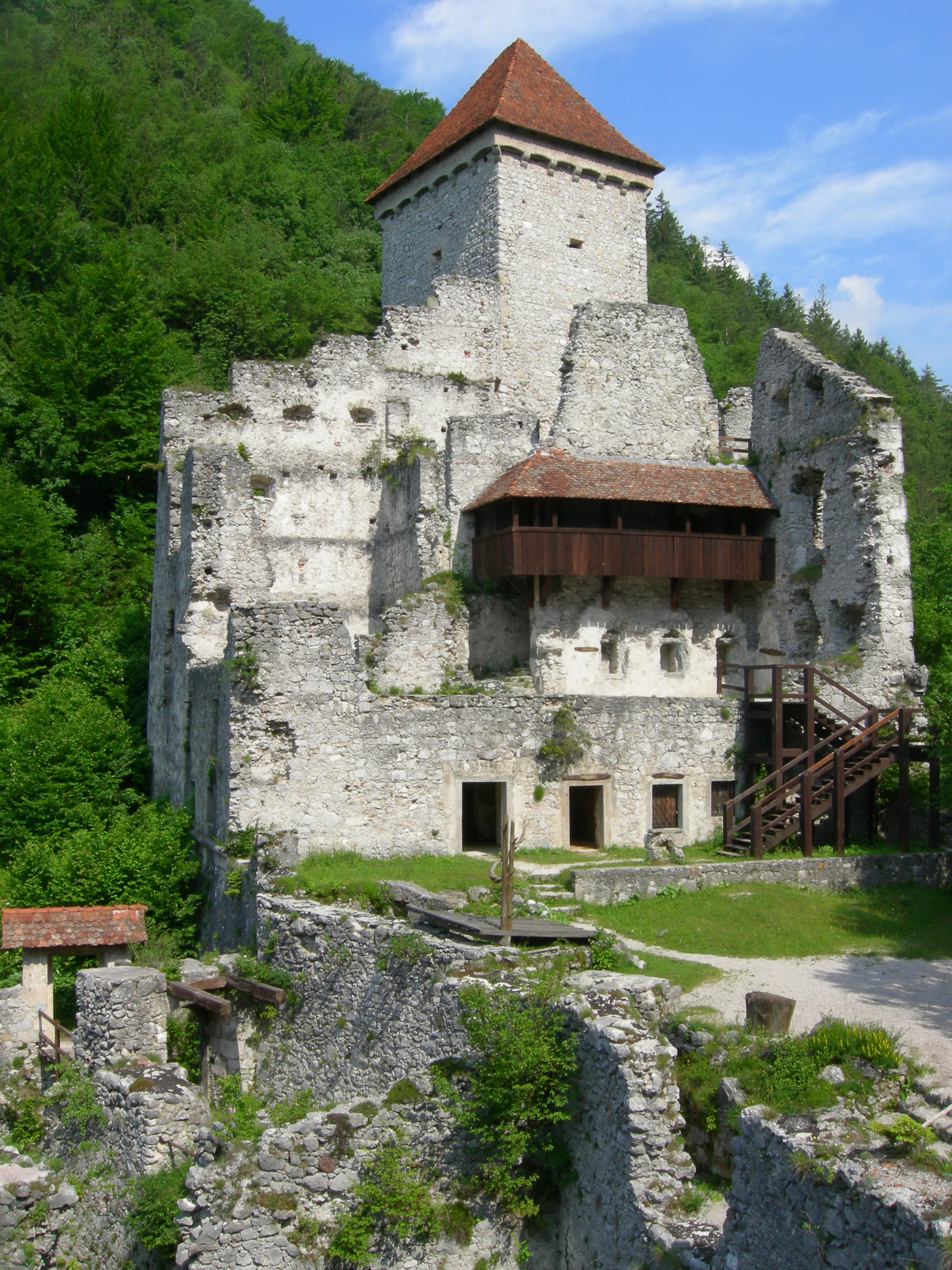
Kamen Castle
