= Harald Duschek =

East German ski jumper

Personal information
- Full name: Harald Duschek
- Born: 5 May 1956 (age 70) Thale, Bezirk Halle, East Germany

Sport
- Sport: Skiing

World Cup career
- Seasons: 1980–1982
- Updated on 30 Mar 2015

Harald Duschek (born 5 May 1956) is an East German former ski jumper. He competed in the large hill event at the 1980 Winter Olympics.

In 1996 he began working as a leader for a medical rehabilitation program conducting therapy.
