= John Broman =

American ski jumper

Personal information
- Nationality: United States
- Born: 1958 (age 67–68) Duluth, Minnesota, USA

Sport
- Sport: Skiing

World Cup career
- Seasons: 1980–1983
- Indiv. starts: 20
- Indiv. podiums: 2
- Indiv. wins: 1
- Updated on 10 February 2016

John Broman (born 1958) is an American former ski jumper. His sons Anders and Bjorn are division 1 basketball athletes at Winthrop University.

== World Cup ==
=== Standings ===
Season	Overall	4H
1979/80	—	89
1980/81	19	61
1981/82	32	77
1982/83	52	—

=== Wins ===
No.	Season	Date	Location	Hill	Size
1	1980/81	22 February 1981	(Canada) Thunder Bay	Big Thunder K120	LH
