= Josip Križaj =

Josip Križaj may refer to:

- Josip Križaj (aviator) (1911–1948), Slovene military pilot
- Josip Križaj (opera singer) (1887–1968), Slovene opera singer
