= Kari Ylianttila =

Finnish ski jumper (born 1953)

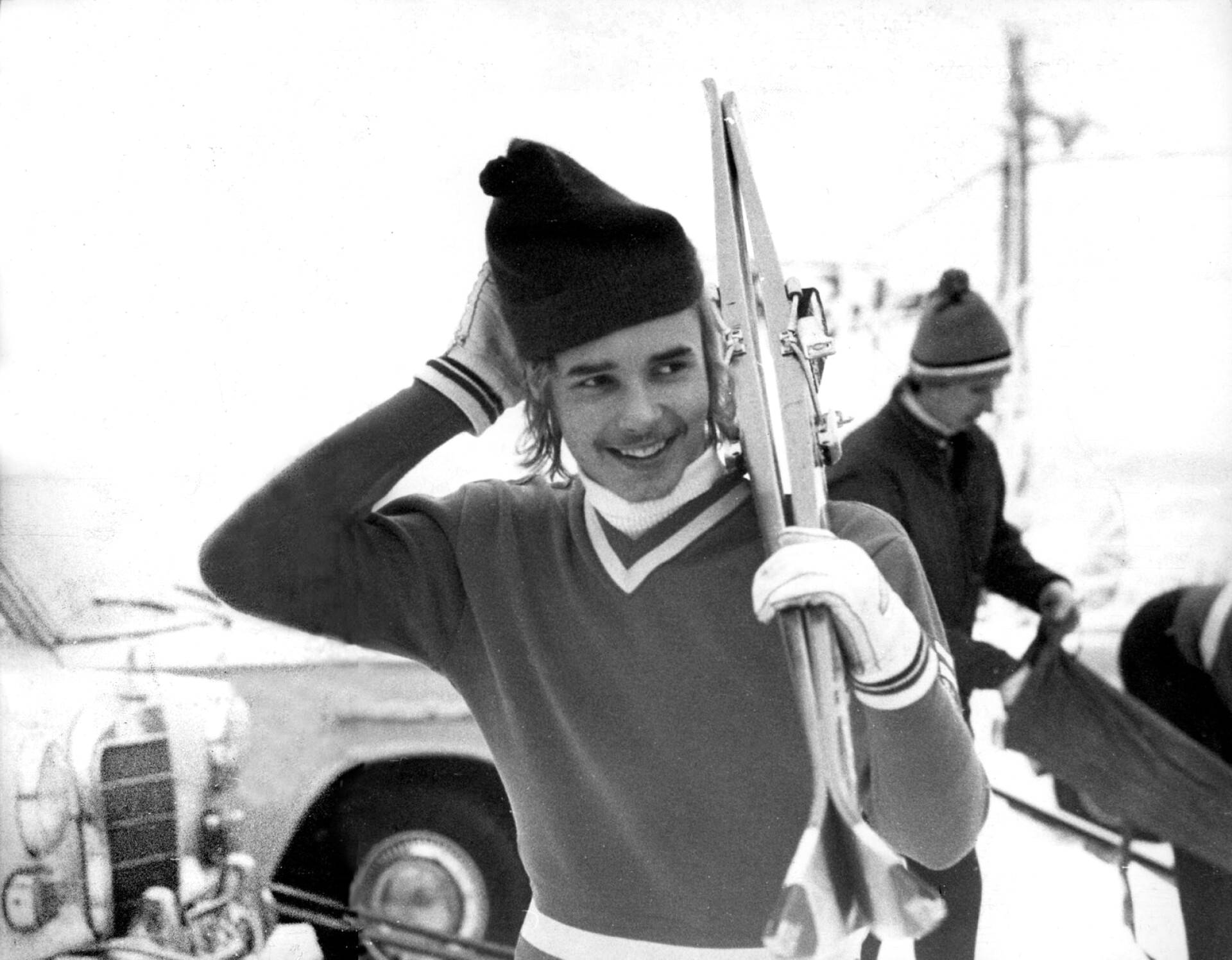
- Ylianttila in 1972

Personal information
- Full name: Kari Ylianttila
- Nationality: Finland
- Born: 28 August 1953 (age 72) Rovaniemi, Finland

Sport
- Sport: Skiing

World Cup career
- Seasons: 1979–1982
- Indiv. podiums: 5
- Indiv. wins: 1
- Four Hills titles: 1 (1978)
- Updated on 15 May 2015

Kari Sakari "Kaale" Ylianttila (born 28 August 1953) is a Finnish former ski jumper who competed from 1971 to 1982. His career best achievement was winning the Four Hills Tournament in 1977–78, in which he scored his lone individual victory in Bischofshofen on 6 January 1978. He also competed in two Winter Olympics (1972 and 1980), earning his best finish of 13th twice, both in the individual large hill events. At the FIS Nordic World Ski Championships 1982 in Oslo, Ylianttila finished 19th in the individual large hill and 21st in the individual normal hill events.
