= Axel Zitzmann =

East German ski jumper

Personal information
- Nationality: East Germany
- Born: 21 February 1959 (age 67) Gräfenthal, East Germany
- Height: 179 cm (5 ft 10 in)

Sport
- Sport: Skiing
- Club: SC Motor Zella-Mehlis

World Cup career
- Seasons: 1981
- Indiv. starts: 5
- Indiv. podiums: 1

Achievements and titles
- Personal bests: 170 m (560 ft); Planica, Yugoslavia (15-17 March 1979)
Medal record
World Championships
Men's ski flying
Silver medal – second place	1979 Planica	Individual

Axel Zitzmann (born 21 February 1959) is an East German former ski jumper who competed from 1979 to 1981.

== Career ==
He won silver medal at the FIS Ski Flying World Championships 1979 in Planica. Zitman's best World Cup event in ski jumping was third in the large hill event in 1981, also in Planica.

On 17 March 1979, he crashed as trial jumper at ski jumping world record distance at 179 metres (587 ft) on Velikanka bratov Gorišek K165 in Planica, Yugoslavia.

== Invalid ski jumping world record ==
Date	Hill	Location	Metres	Feet
17 March 1979	Velikanka bratov Gorišek K165	Planica, Yugoslavia	179	587

Not recognized! Crash at world record distance.
