= Terry Kern =

American ski jumper (born 1954)

Terry Kern (born April 26, 1954) is an American former ski jumper who competed in the 1976 Winter Olympics.
