= Na Golici =

"Na Golici / Trompeten-Echo"

Single by Gorenjski kvartet

from the album Trompetenecho/Slowenische Bauerntanz
- B-side: "Slowenischer Bauertanz"
- Released: 1955
- Recorded: 21 January 1955 (Radio Kärnten, Austria)
- Genre: polka
- Length: 2:40
- Label: Telefunken (Germany); Jugoton (Slovenia)
- Composers: Slavko Avsenik; Vilko Avsenik
- Producer: Fred Rauch

Na Golici (German: Trompetenecho) is a Slovenian polka instrumental composed by Slavko Avsenik (1929-2015) and arranged by his brother Vilko Ovsenik (1928-2017, he used an older spelling of the family name). The song was written in 1954 and first recorded in January 1955 in the Radio Kärnten (Carinthia) studio in Klagenfurt, Austria. It is considered the most played instrumental tune in the world. At this time, the band was renamed to Gorenjski kvintet (Original Oberkrainer Quintett). This song has been covered more than 600 times all over the world.

Golica (German: Kahlkogel), the 1,836 metres (6,024 ft) high Slovenian mountain from which the song takes its name, is a peak in the Western Karawanks, on the border between Slovenia and Austria, above the Slovene town of Jesenice. It is known mainly for its fields of wild white narcissi, swathes of which cover Golica and surrounding pastures in late April and early May. Despite having given the song this title, Slavko Avsenik was never in his life on Golica. Today the band is known as Ansambel bratov Avsenik (Slavko Avsenik und seine Original Oberkrainer), even though the band no longers exists.
