= Peter Leitner =

German ski jumper

Personal information
- Full name: Peter Leitner
- Born: 5 January 1956 (age 70) Oberstdorf, West Germany

Sport
- Sport: Skiing

World Cup career
- Seasons: 1980
- Indiv. podiums: 1
- Updated on 30 Mar 2015

Peter Leitner (born 5 January 1956) is a West German former ski jumper. He competed at the 1980 Winter Olympics.
