= Kip Sundgaard =

American ski jumper

Kip Sundgaard (born 15 February 1956) is an American former ski jumper who competed in the 1976 Winter Olympics.

In 1973, Kip was a National Junior Team member. In 1974, as a 17-year-old, he topped the field of the Saint Paul Winter Carnival Tournament—held at Battle Creek Park—with jumps of 196 feet (59.7 m) and 197 feet (60.0 m), which tied the hill record. Additionally, he leaped 202 feet (61.6 m), but a fall kept that effort from remaining in the record book.

Sundgaard attended the University of Utah in Salt Lake City and won the NCAA title in 1976. He also placed second that year at the Canadian Nationals. Sundgaard was on the U.S. team for eight years, competing at the 1976 Winter Olympics and several World Championships. His greatest ever jump came in 1979 in Yugoslavia on the ski flying hill (Letalnica bratov Gorišek) at Planica (now Slovenia), when he went 464 feet (141 m).

Jumping for the St. Paul Ski Club, he won the St. Paul Memorial Trophy eight times, given to the winner of their annual competition. Sundgaard was inducted into the American Ski Jumping Hall of Fame in 2008.
