= Thomas Prosser (ski jumper) =

German ski jumper (born 1960)

Personal information
- Full name: Thomas Prosser

Sport
- Sport: Skiing

World Cup career
- Seasons: 1980–1982
- Indiv. podiums: 1
- Updated on 30 Mar 2015

Thomas Prosser (born 15 December 1960) is a West German former ski jumper.
