= Slavko Avsenik =

Slovene composer and musician (1929–2015)

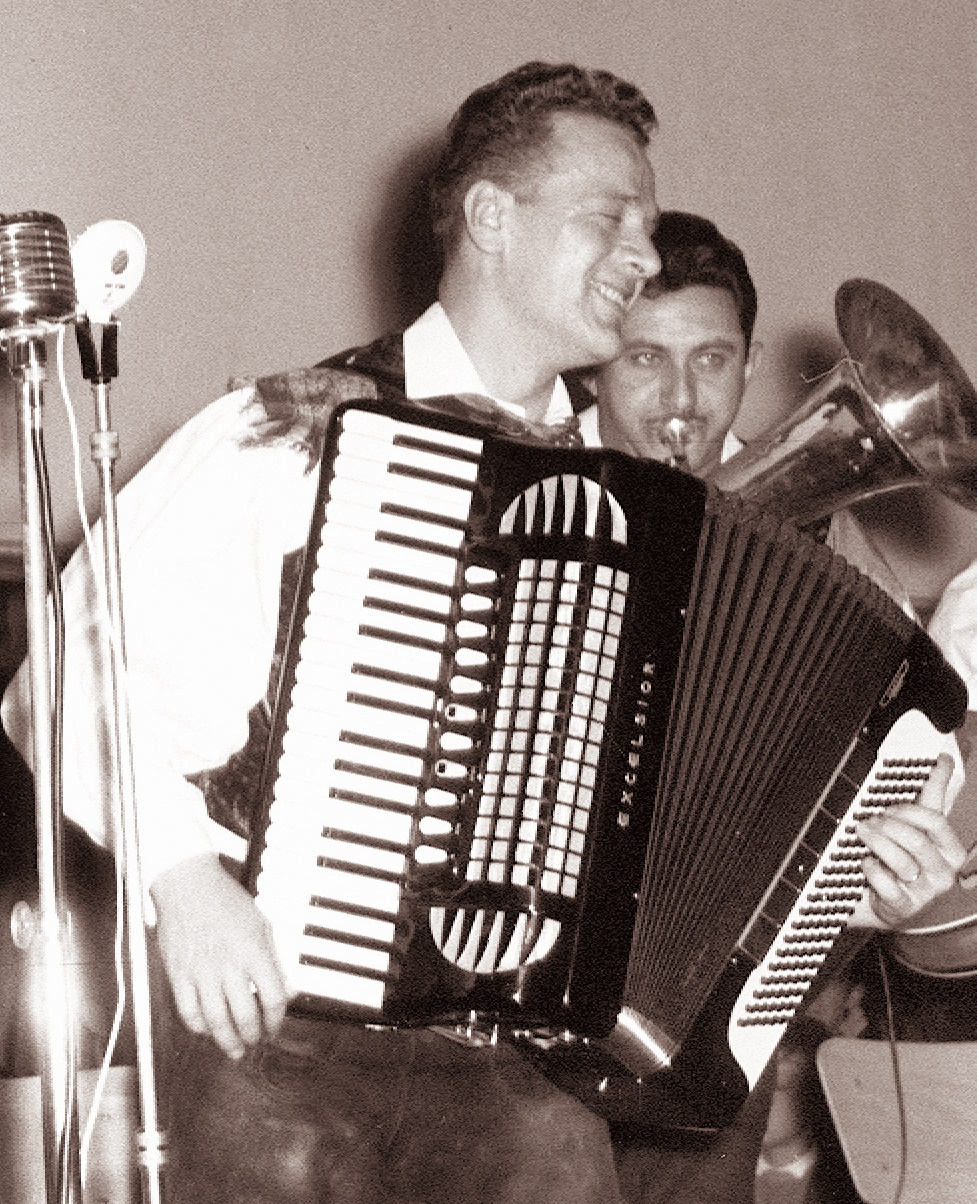
- Slavko Avsenik in 1963

Background information
- Born: November 26, 1929; Begunje na Gorenjskem, Kingdom of Yugoslavia
- Died: July 2, 2015 (aged 85) Slovenia
- Genres: Oberkrain ethnic, polka, waltz
- Occupations: Singer-songwriter, band leader, album producer
- Instruments: piano accordion, Vocal
- Years active: 1953–2015
- Website: avsenik.com

Slavko Avsenik (November 26, 1929 – July 2, 2015) was a Slovene composer and musician. Beginning in 1953 with the formation of the Avsenik Brothers Ensemble, Avsenik produced more than 1,000 songs and garnered success both in Slovenia and in other parts of Europe and America, and is viewed as a Slovenian cultural icon.

== Biography and career ==
Slavko Avsenik was born on November 26, 1929 in the village of Begunje na Gorenjskem, municipality of Radovljica, in the Upper Carniola region of Slovenia. Avsenik was a self-taught musician, who entered the music business "by coincidence" in 1952. In 1953 he established the Avsenik Brothers Ensemble with his brother Vilko Avsenik (also spelt Ovsenik), who was a university-trained clarinet player.

His ensemble, known as 'Ansambel bratov Avsenik' in Slovenian and 'Slavko Avsenik und seine Original Oberkrainer' in German, was already quite popular in Slovenia by 1954, but it was their 1954 hit "Na Golici" which brought them international fame and renown. When the original recording was played during 'Slovene Hour' on Klagenfurt Radio in the Austrian state of Carinthia (which has a sizeable Slovenian minority), Bavarian radio producer Fred Rauch immediately recognized the potential and signed the band to his label. They recorded a new version in 1955 in German, which became a huge hit first in the German-speaking world and then after, all around Europe. Growing in popularity, they soon began appearing in broadcasts, movies, and concerts, first in West Germany and then all over Europe.

In 1960, the band landed a recording contract with Telefunken-Decca. It appeared regularly on network television, toured continuously, logging over 400,000 miles in 1967 alone. Milestones include a 1961 performance before over 80,000 in Berlin Stadium, tours of the United States and Canada in 1970 and 1985, and a one-hour German television network special in 1980.

The group has won numerous awards including eight television competitions, twelve from German network television, eighteen as Germany's most popular band, the recording industry's "European Oscar" in 1975, the Golden Rose Award for the most requested group on Austrian radio in 1979, and the Hermann Löns award from the German Minister of Culture.

Avsenik's influence over Cleveland-style polka music began in 1958 when Johnny Pecon's English lyrics transformed Slavko's "Tam kjer murke cveto" into a Cleveland-style Hit, "Little Fella". Since then, Cleveland-style orchestras have recorded well over 200 Avsenik songs, including nearly sixty by the Hank Haller Ensemble, and as many more by Fred Ziwich, Fred Kuhar, the Fairport Ensemble, Al Markic, Roger Bright, Al Tercek, and Cilka Dolgan. Avsenik tribute bands in North America include Duke Marsic and his Happy Slovenians, the Alpine Sextet, Ansambel Veseli Godci and Veseli Farani, Marjan Kramer, and Planinski Kvintet. Many Slovenian polka/oberkrainer-style bands in Europe have also been influenced by Avsenik's music, including Slovenia's Hišni ansambel Avsenik and Gašperji/Die Jungen Oberkrainer.

The most popular song of Avsenik's band is a polka titled "Na Golici" in Slovene, "Trompetenecho" in German, and "Trumpet Echoes" in English, which is considered by some to be the most played instrumental song in the world.

Over forty years, the Avsenik Ensemble's original "Oberkrainer" sound became an example of ethnic musical expression for Slovenia, Austria, Germany, Switzerland, northern Italy and the Benelux countries, spawning hundreds of Alpine orchestras in the process.

== Death and legacy ==
Slavko Avsenik died on July 2, 2015, at the age of 85. Since 2008, the Avsenik Festival has been held in his home town of Begunje in his honor, featuring over 30 ensembles including the Sašo Avsenik Ensemble featuring his grandson Sašo Avsenik and his son Gregor Avsenik. One of his other sons, Slavko Avsenik Jr., is one of Slovenia's most prominent film composers.

A monument was built by architect Klemen Rodman in 2013 to mark Avsenik's 84th birthday, near his home town in the municipality of Radovljica. It features three accordions surrounding a traditional Upper Carniolan umbrella.

== Albums ==
- Goldene Klänge Aus Oberkrain (Telefunken, 1971)
- Goldene Klänge Aus Oberkrain II (Telefunken, 1973)
- Jägerlatein in Oberkrain (Telefunken, 1974)
- Jägerlatein in Oberkrain (London International, 1974)
- Es Ist So Schön Ein Musikant Zu Sein (2xLP, Telefunken, 1974)
- 16 Welterfolge (Telefunken, 1975)
- Mit Musik Und Guter Laune (2xLP, Telefunken, 1975)
- Sonntagskonzert (Telefunken, 1975)
- Lustig Und Fidel (Telefunken, 1978)
- He! Slavko! Spiel Uns Eins! (Telefunken, 1978)
- Ein Feuerwerk Der Musik (Koch Records, 1986)
- Wir Bleiben Gute Freunde (Koch Records, 1990)
- Es Ist So Schön Ein Musikant Zu Sein (Virgin, 1990)
- Polkafest in Oberkrain (CD, Koch Records, 1997)
- Am Schönsten Ist's Zu Haus
- Mit Musik Und Guter Laune
- Auf Silbernen Spuren (Royal Sound)
- Stelldichein in Oberkrain (Telefunken)
- Daheim in Oberkrain (Telefunken)
- Die 20 Besten (cass)
- Ein Abend Mit Slavko Avsenik Und Seinen Original Oberkrainern (Telefunken)
- Mit Polka Und Waltzer Durch Die Welt (Telefunken)
- Im Schönen Oberkrain (Telefunken, Deutscher Schallplattenclub)
- Die Oberkrainer Spielen Auf (10", Telefunken)
