= Sport in Croatia =

Culture of Croatia

Sport in Croatia (Croatian: Sport u Hrvatskoj) has significant role in Croatian culture, and many local sports clubs as well as the Croatian national squads enjoy strong followings in the country. The most enduring sport by far in Croatia is football, and is played on amateur and professional levels amongst all age groups across the entire country. Several other major team sports are handball, basketball and water polo, with clubs in all parts of Croatia. Ice hockey is another popular team sport, namely in the Croatian interior. The most popular individual sports in Croatia are tennis, alpine skiing, and swimming, and to some extent table tennis and chess. Various amateur sport games are popular in Croatia, notably picigin.

== History ==
Franjo Bučar (1866–1946) is widely considered to be the father of modern Croatian sport. He founded the Croatian Sports Association in 1909 within what was then the Austro-Hungarian Empire. Bučar introduced a multitude of mainstream sports in Croatia, such as football, alpine skiing, ice skating and ice hockey, as well as gymnastics and fencing. The Franjo Bučar State Award for Sport, the Republic of Croatia's highest award in the development of sport, is named in his honor.

With the exception of the years during the World War Two Independent State of Croatia, Croatian club and national teams first represented the Republic of Croatia at the start of the 1990s, with the formation of the Croatian national football team and its first match against the United States in 1990.

Since independence, Croatia hosted several world championships in Olympic sports: two World Handball Championships (2003 women's and 2009 men's), the 2022 World Shotgun Championships (Osijek), and the 2025 World Wrestling Championships (Zagreb).

== Team sports ==
=== Association football ===
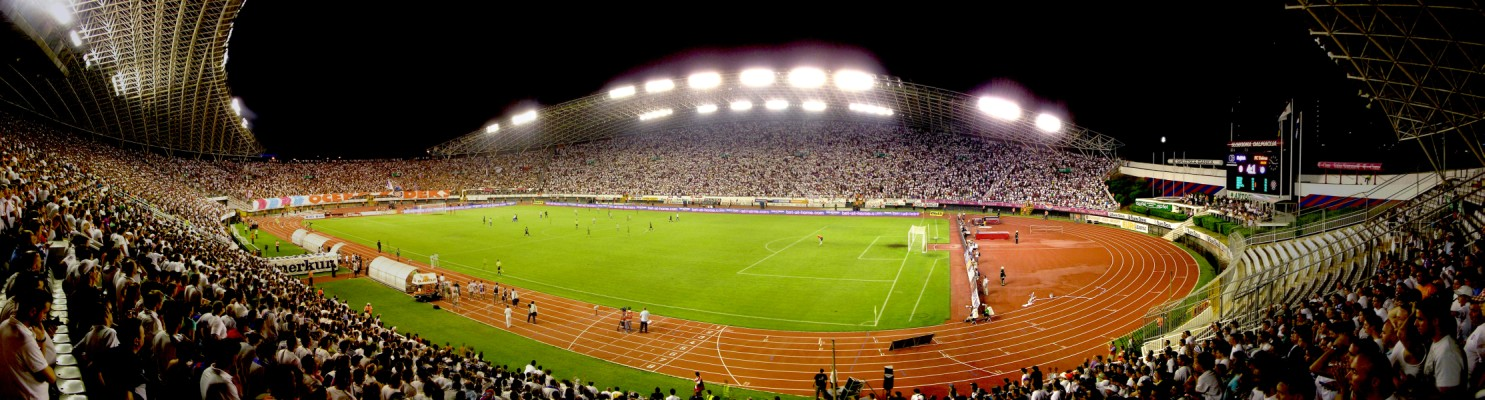
Sellout crowd at Poljud Stadium for a Hajduk Split match

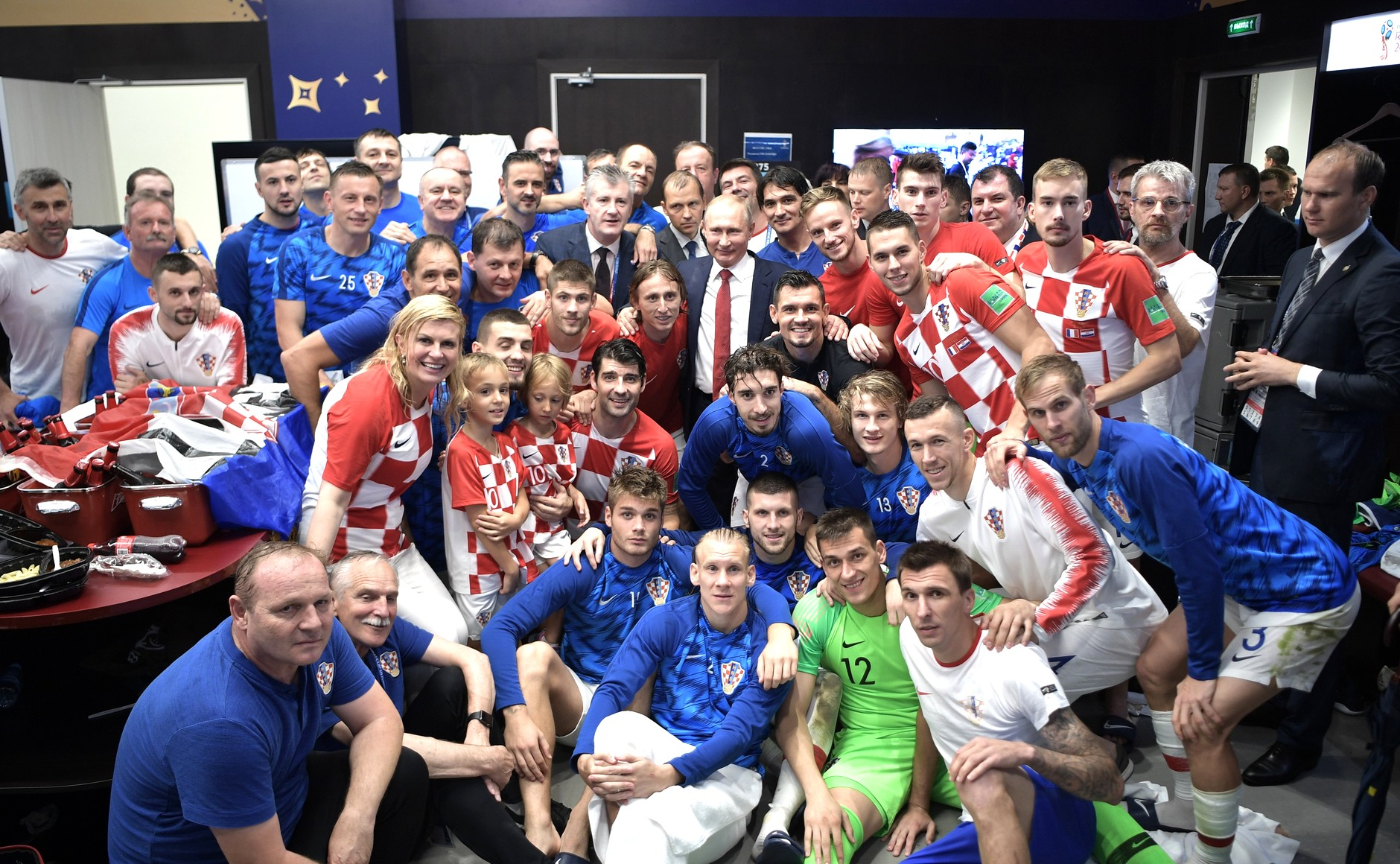
The 2017–18 national squad, dubbed the "Second Golden Generation", posing with Vladimir Putin and Kolinda Grabar-Kitarović after the 2018 World Cup Final against France.

Football is the most popular sport in Croatia, and is governed by the Croatian Football Federation. The Prva HNL is the top division of the country's football league system, and operates on a system of promotion and relegation with the Druga HNL.

Dinamo Zagreb is the country's most successful football club and the 2019 champion, with 20 total championships, followed by Hajduk Split with 6 championships (last one in 2005). The rivalry between these two clubs is known as the Eternal Derby in Croatia, with the two clubs combining to win all but one of the 20 championships ever contested in the league's history. The Prva HNL is ranked 17th league in Europe by UEFA, and Dinamo Zagreb is the highest-ranked Croatian club in Europe, occupying the 30th spot.

The Croatian Cup is the main knock-out tournament in Croatian football, and has also been dominated by Dinamo Zagreb and Hajduk Split. The Croatian Supercup is contested between the champions of the Prva HNL and the Croatian Cup.

No Croatian club has ever won the UEFA Champions League, however Hajduk Split, at the time Croatia's premier club, made it to the quarter-finals of the 1994–95 league, losing on aggregate to eventual champion Ajax.

The Croatia national football team won a bronze medal in the 1998 FIFA World Cup and a silver medal in the 2018 FIFA World Cup and a bronze medal in the 2022 FIFA World Cup. Davor Šuker won the Golden Boot as the top goalscorer in 1998 and Luka Modrić won the Golden Ball as the best player of the tournament in 2018. The national football team has also played in the quarter-finals of the 1996 and the 2008 European Championships. As of August 2018, the team was ranked 4th in the FIFA World Rankings. Today, Croatia's most popular footballers include Luka Modrić, Mario Mandžukić, Ivica Olić, Darijo Srna, Ivan Perišić, Ivan Klasnić, Niko Kranjčar, Ivan Rakitić and Vedran Ćorluka, as well as foreign-born Josip Šimunić, Eduardo da Silva and Sammir. In August 2012, Modrić was acquired by Spanish giants and 31-time La Liga champions Real Madrid for a deal totalling over £33 million, and he made his debut as a substitute in Real's 2–1 victory over Catalan rivals FC Barcelona.

=== Team handball ===
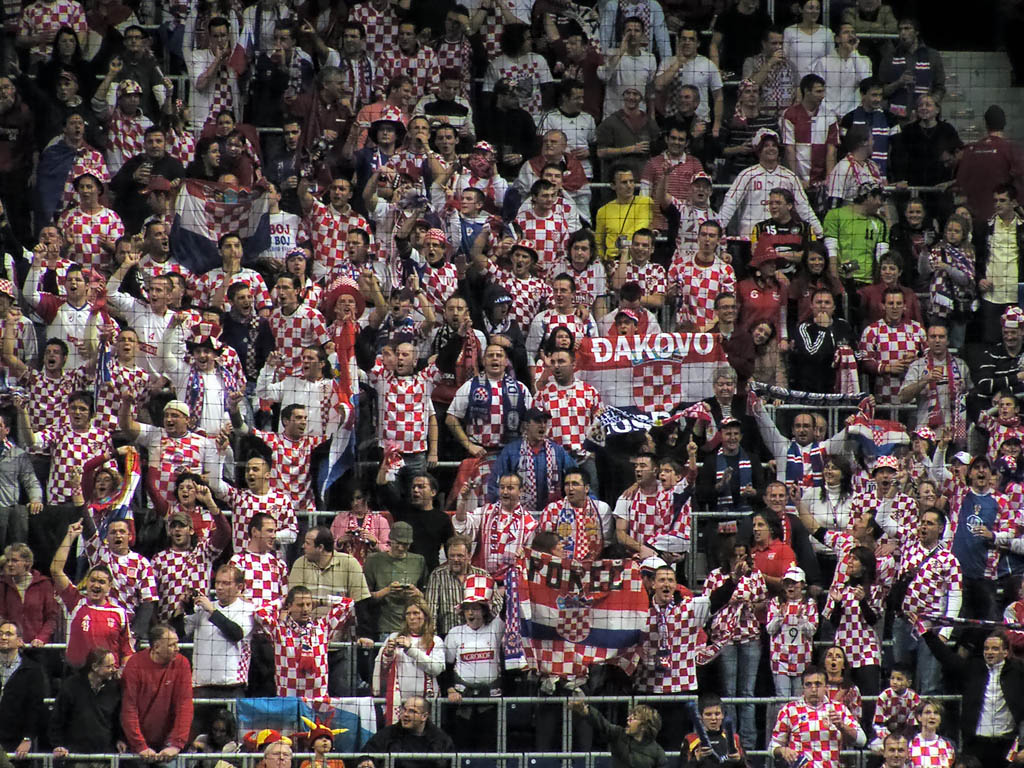
Croatian handball fans in the 2009 World Championship.

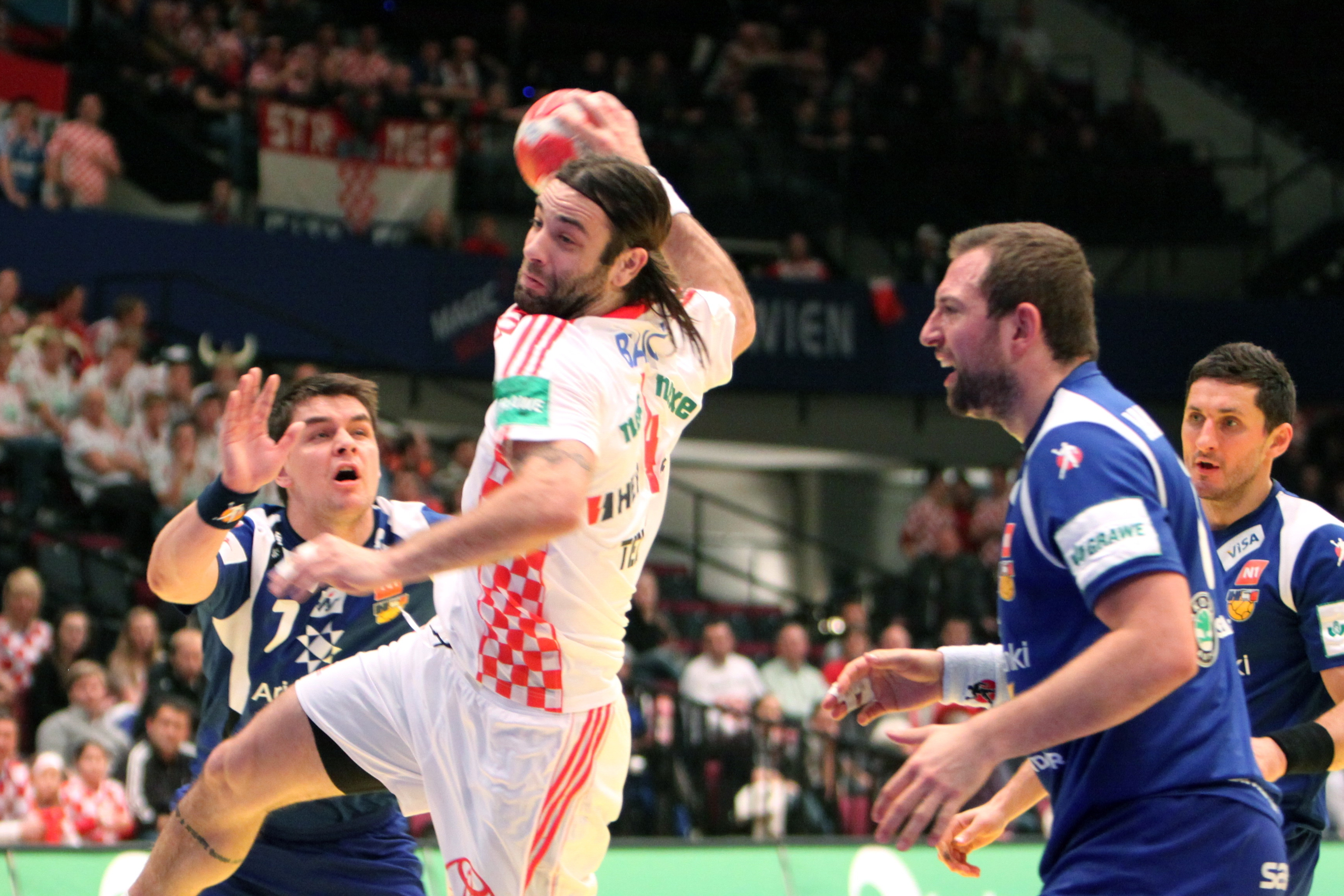
Ivano Balić was voted the best handball player in history in an online poll organised by the International Handball Federation.

Historically, Croatia has been a prolific nation in handball, both in the success of its club handball, as well as with the achievements of the Croatian national squad.

At the start of the 2nd half of the 20th century, RK Bjelovar dominated Croatian handball, and in the 1970s won five Yugoslav league championships. In 1972 RK Bjelovar won the EHF Champions League, Europe's greatest handball competition, and reached the final the following year. A smaller city, Bjelovar's reign of successes can be likened to that of the storied Vince Lombardi–era Green Bay Packers of the National Football League, as the town of Green Bay, Wisconsin, the smallest NFL market in the United States, brought home five league championships in the 1960s.

Since Croatian independence, RK Zagreb has been the nation's premier handball club. It has won every Croatian First Handball League championship that has been contested, 28 in all. The club has reached the EHF Champions League finals six times, winning consecutively in 1992 and 1993. In 2008, the club acquired Croatian star Ivano Balić, considered the best handballer of all time.

The Croatia men's national handball team is currently ranked 10th in the world by the International Handball Federation. At the 1996 and 2004 Summer Olympics, Croatia won gold medals in men's handball. The squad also has won the 2003 World Men's Handball Championship and came in second at the 1995 and 2005 world championships, as well as at the 2009 World Championship as hosts, losing in the final to France. Croatia also came in third at the 1994 World Championship and second at the 2008 and 2010 European championships. Croatia will once host the world handball tournament in 2025, along Denmark and Norway.

=== Basketball ===
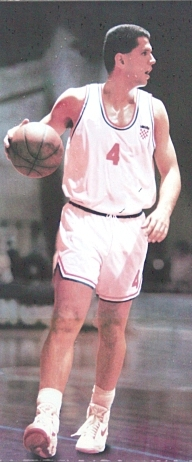
Dražen Petrović playing with the Croatia national team.

The Croatia national basketball team has won a silver medal at the 1992 Olympic basketball tournament, bronze medal at the 1994 World Championship and bronze medals at EuroBasket 1993 and EuroBasket 1995.

Croatian basketball clubs were EuroLeague champions five times: KK Split three times (1989, 1990 and 1991) and KK Cibona in 1985 and 1986. Croatian basketball players such as Krešimir Ćosić, Dino Rađa and Toni Kukoč were amongst the first foreign players to succeed in the National Basketball Association (NBA) in the United States. One of the most notable Croatian basketballers was Dražen Petrović, who died in a car accident in June 1993. He is considered a crucial part of the vanguard to the present-day mass influx of European players into the NBA and he was posthumously enshrined in the Naismith Memorial Basketball Hall of Fame. In 2013, he was voted the best European Basketball player in history, by players at the 2013 FIBA EuroBasket.

=== Water polo ===
The Croatia national water polo team won gold medals in the 2007 and 2017 World Championships, and bronze medals in the 2009 and 2011 World Championships.

The team also won gold at the 2012 and silver at the 1996 and 2016 Summer Olympics, as well as gold at the 2010 and silvers in the 1999 and 2003 European Championships.

Croatian water polo clubs were 13 times LEN Champions League champions. HAVK Mladost from Zagreb is a seven time European champion (1968, 1969, 1970, 1972, 1990, 1991 and 1996) and was awarded the title Best Club of the 20th Century by the LEN. VK Jug from Dubrovnik and VK Jadran from Split are both three time European champions, while POŠK, also from Split, is a European champion from 1999.

=== Ice hockey ===
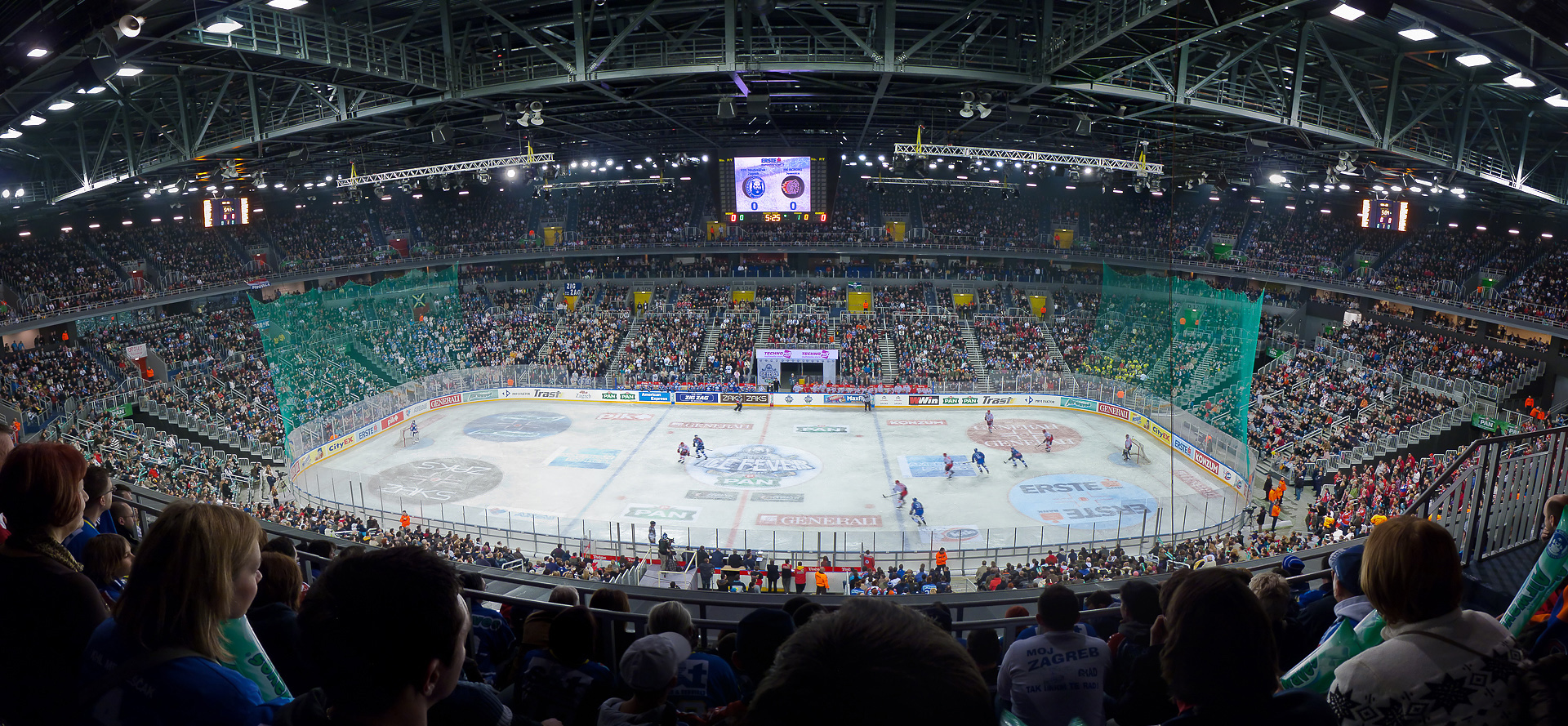
KHL Medveščak Zagreb in the Zagreb Arena

Introduced at the start of the 20th century, ice hockey became one of Croatia's first organized and federated sports, with Franjo Bučar's founding of the Association for Skating and Ice Hockey, the precursor to the modern Croatian Ice Hockey Federation. From the late 1930s until Croatia's independence, Croatian ice hockey clubs competed in the Yugoslav Hockey League, with Croatia's most successful club KHL Medveščak Zagreb winning the championship three consecutive times from 1988 to 1990.

Ice hockey is particularly popular in the interior regions of Croatia's Pannonia, Slavonia, Zagreb and Zagorje, where winters are as cold as in more prolific hockey nations such as Slovakia and the Czech Republic. Today, KHL Medveščak competes in the Russian Kontinental Hockey League or KHL, the top-tier Russian tournament and the 2nd highest-ranking ice hockey league in the world. Before joining KHL, Medveščak played in the Austrian EBEL, Medveščak debuted in EBEL in the 2009 season and it has qualified for the playoffs every year.

Medveščak joined the Kontinental Hockey League in the 2013–14 season.

=== Volleyball ===
Croatia women's national volleyball team won silver medals three times at European Volleyball Championship in 1995, 1997 and 1999.

== Individual sports ==
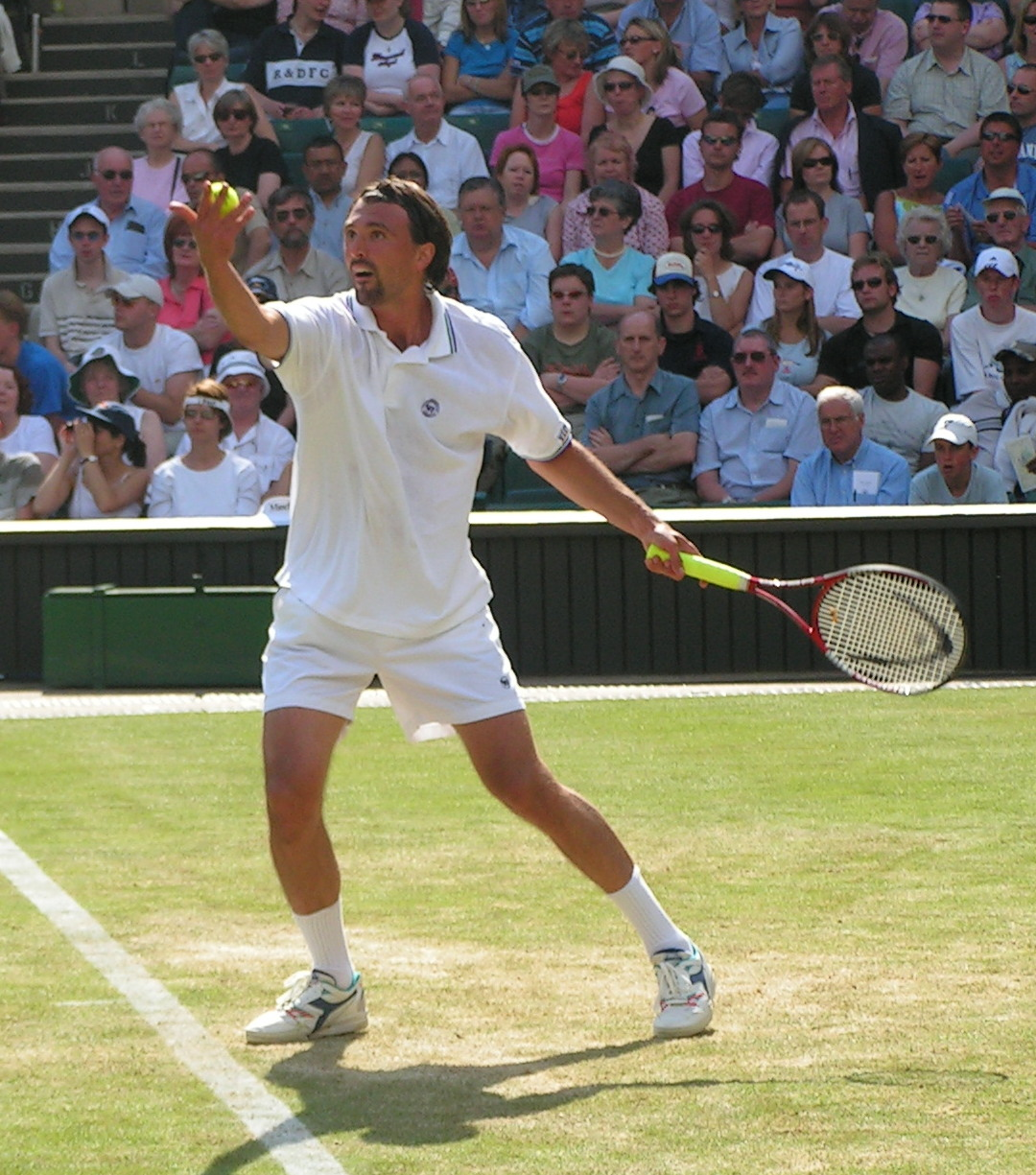
Croatian tennis star Goran Ivanišević at Wimbledon, 2004

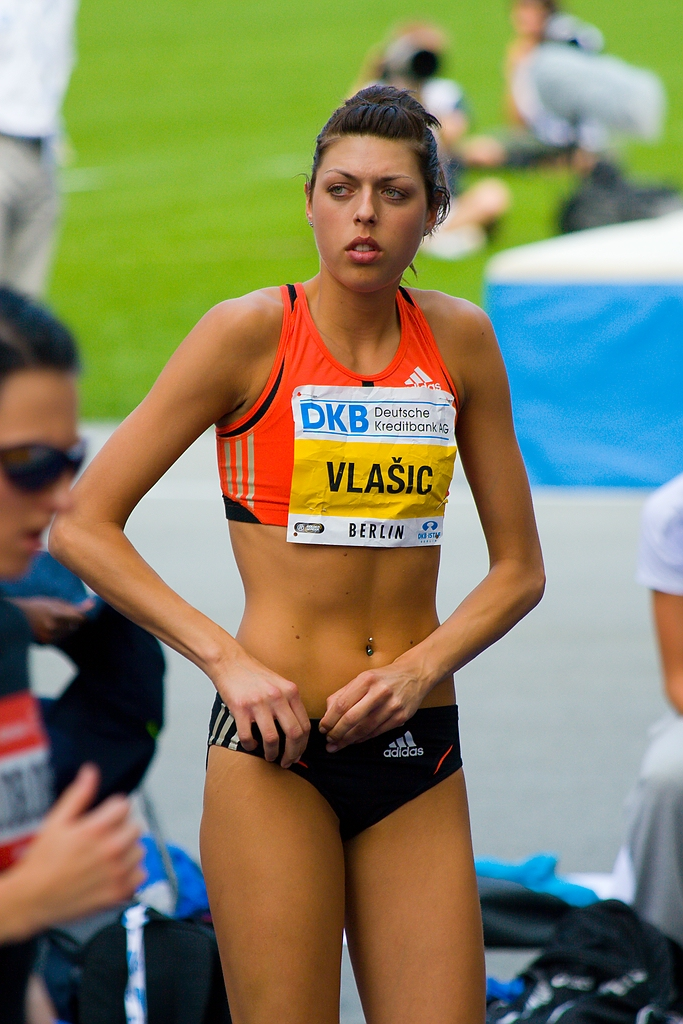
Blanka Vlašić, European and World high jump champion and 2010 European athlete of the year

Janica Kostelić is the most successful female alpine ski racer in the history of the Winter Olympic Games. She is the only woman to win four gold medals in alpine skiing at the Winter Olympics Alpine skiing events (in 2002 and 2006), and the only woman to win three alpine skiing gold medals in one Olympics (2002). She also won two silver medals in 2006. Janica was the World Cup overall champion in 2001, 2003, and 2006. On February 5, 2006, Janica became only the second female skier to win all five disciplines in one season. She also holds the record for the highest number of points in one World Cup season. In 2006 she won Laureus World Sports Award for Sportswoman of the Year. Her elder brother Ivica Kostelić was the 2003 World Champion in slalom and the Men's Overall Champion at the 2011 Alpine Skiing World Cup, and as of 14 February 2014 is a four-time Winter Olympic silver medalist himself. Zrinka Ljutić won the slalom title in the 2025 World Cup.

Blanka Vlašić is the best-known Croatian track and field athlete; she specialises in the high jump. She is 2007 and 2009 World Champion. Blanka is also 2008 World Indoor Champion, 2008 Olympic silver medalist and 2016 Olympic bronze medalist. Her personal best is 2.08 m (6 ft 9.89 in) (which is only 1 cm less than the world record) set in Zagreb on August 31, 2009.

Goran Ivanišević became the first ever wildcard to win Wimbledon when he won his first and only Grand Slam title in 2001. He was previously a three time runner-up at the event. Croatia also won Davis Cup on two occasions in 2005 and 2018. Other Grand Slam champions from Croatia include 2014 US Open champion Marin Čilić and 1997 French Open champion Iva Majoli.

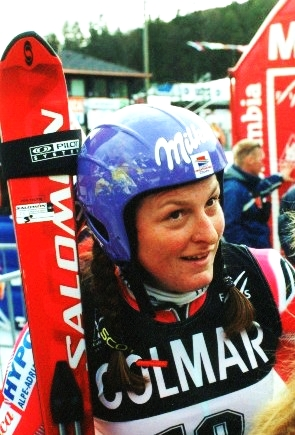
Janica Kostelić, considered to be one of the greatest female skiers of all time.

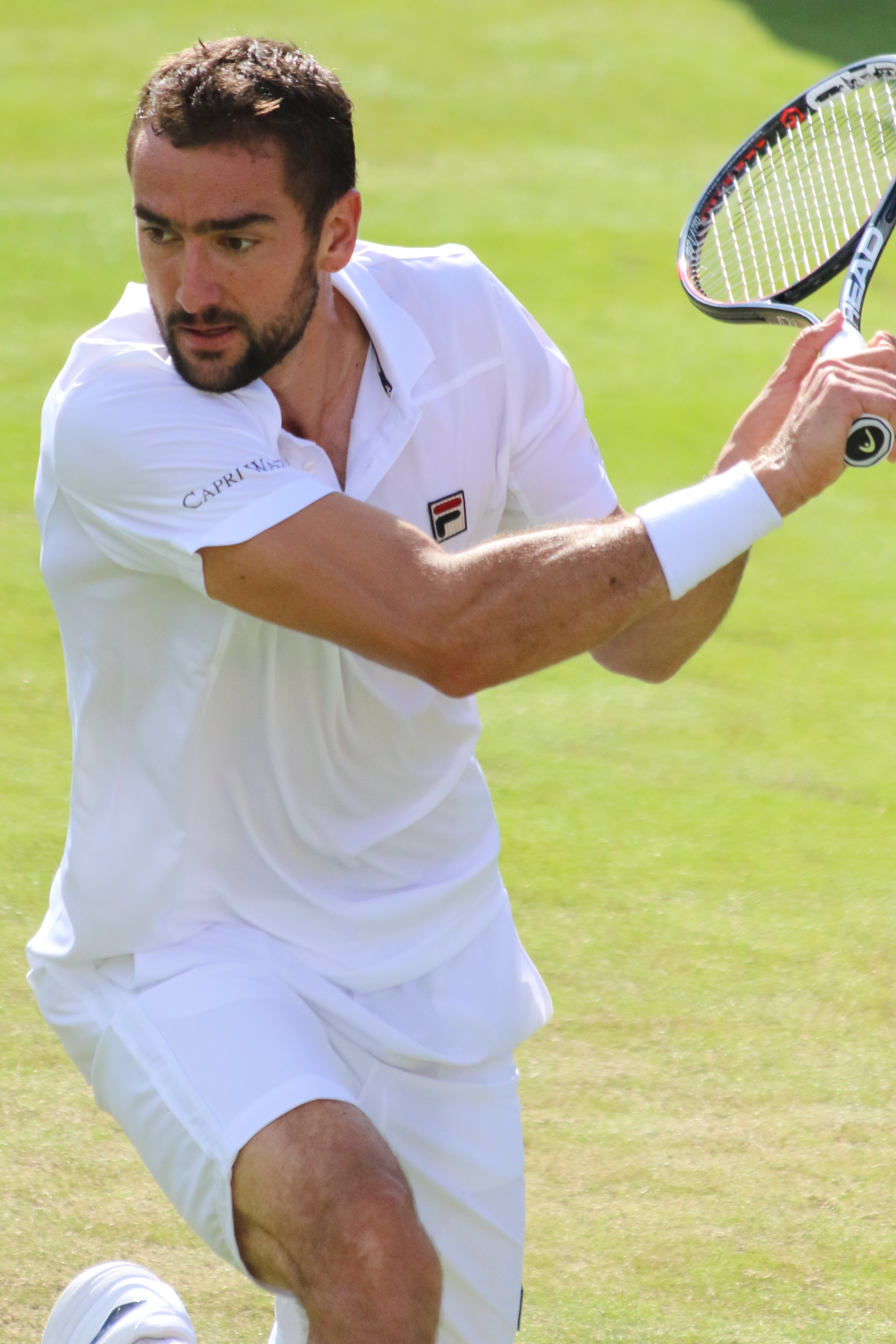
Marin Čilić, former ATP number 3 and 2014 US Open champion.

Croatian athletes have had considerable success in individual sports as well, where they represented Croatia in international competitions at the highest level. These sports include:

- Alpine skiing
  - Janica Kostelić, Ivica Kostelić, Natko Zrnčić-Dim, Ana Jelušić, Nika Fleiss, Sofija Novoselić, Zrinka Ljutić, Filip Zubčić, Leona Popović
- Archery
  - Ivana Buden
- Athletics
  - Blanka Vlašić, Branko Zorko, Sandra Perković, Ana Šimić, Ivan Horvat, Lisa Stublić, Sara Kolak, Stipe Žunić, Siniša Ergotić, Franjo Mihalić, Ivan Gubijan, Filip Mihaljević
- Biathlon
  - Jakov Fak (now competes for Slovenia)
- Boxing
  - Željko Mavrović, Stipe Drviš, Mate Parlov, Hrvoje Sep, Filip Hrgović, Damir Škaro, Alen Babić, George Chuvalo/Jure Čuvalo
- Canoeing
  - Matija Ljubek, Danko Herceg, Anamaria Govorčinović
- Chess, Zdenko Kožul, Ivan Šarić, Antonio Radić (most subscribed chess content creator on YouTube)
- Cycling
  - Robert Kišerlovski, Kristijan Đurasek, Marin Ranteš
- Gymnastics
  - Filip Ude, Marijo Možnik, Tin Srbić, Robert Seligman, Aurel Benović
- Figure skating
  - Sanda Dubravčić, Idora Hegel, Tomislav Čižmešija, Željka Čižmešija
- Judo
  - Barbara Matić, Lara Cvjetko,
- Kickboxing
  - Branko Cikatić, Mirko Filipović, Antonio Plazibat
- Mixed martial arts
  - Mirko Filipović, Pat Miletich, Stipe Miočić, Roberto Soldić
- Rowing
  - Nikša Skelin, Siniša Skelin, Martin Sinković, Valent Sinković, David Šain, Damir Martin, Igor Boraska, Tihomir Franković, Krešimir Čuljak, Igor Francetić, Branimir Vujević, Tomislav Smoljanović, Silvijo Petriško
- Sailing
  - Šime Fantela, Igor Marenić, Tonči Stipanović, Tina Mihelić, Enia Ninčević, Romana Župan, Pavle Kostov, Petar Cupać, Ivan Kljaković-Gašpić
- Shooting
  - Giovanni Cernogoraz, Snježana Pejčić, Josip Glasnović, Anton Glasnović, Petar Gorša, Miran Maričić
- Swimming
  - Miloš Milošević, Duje Draganja, Gordan Kožulj, Sanja Jovanović, Đurđica Bjedov, Mihovil Španja, Mario Todorović, Saša Imprić, Matea Samardžić
- Table tennis
  - Zoran Primorac, Tamara Boroš, Dragutin Šurbek, Antun Stipančić, Sandra Paović, Cornelia Molnar, Andrej Gaćina
- Tennis
  - Goran Ivanišević, Ivan Ljubičić, Karolina Šprem, Ivo Karlović, Lovro Zovko, Mirjana Lučić-Baroni, Donna Vekić, Silvija Talaja, Ana Vrljić, Jelena Kostanić Tošić, Ana Konjuh, Tereza Mrdeža, Iva Majoli, Goran Prpić, Mario Ančić, Marin Čilić, Borna Ćorić, Ivan Dodig, Marin Draganja, Petra Martić, Nikola Pilić, Željko Franulović, Mate Pavić, Franko Škugor, Nikola Mektić
- Taekwondo
  - Filip Grgić, Sandra Šarić, Martina Zubčić, Lucija Zaninović, Ana Zaninović, Kristina Tomić, Nataša Vezmar, Matea Jelić, Toni Kanaet, Lena Stojković
- Weightlifting
  - Nikolaj Pešalov, Amar Musić
- Wrestling
  - Nenad Žugaj, Neven Žugaj, Božo Starčević, Vlado Lisjak, Ivan Huklek

== Sports and leagues ==
National organizations and leagues exist in Croatia for most popular sports. Some of these include:

- Football
  - Prva HNL
  - Druga HNL
  - Treća HNL
  - Četvrta HNL
- Handball
  - Premijer liga
- Basketball
  - Premijer liga
- Futsal
  - Croatian First League of Futsal
- Water polo
  - Croatian First League of Water Polo
- Ice hockey
  - Croatian Ice Hockey Championship
- Volleyball
  - Croatian 1A Volleyball League

== National sports teams ==
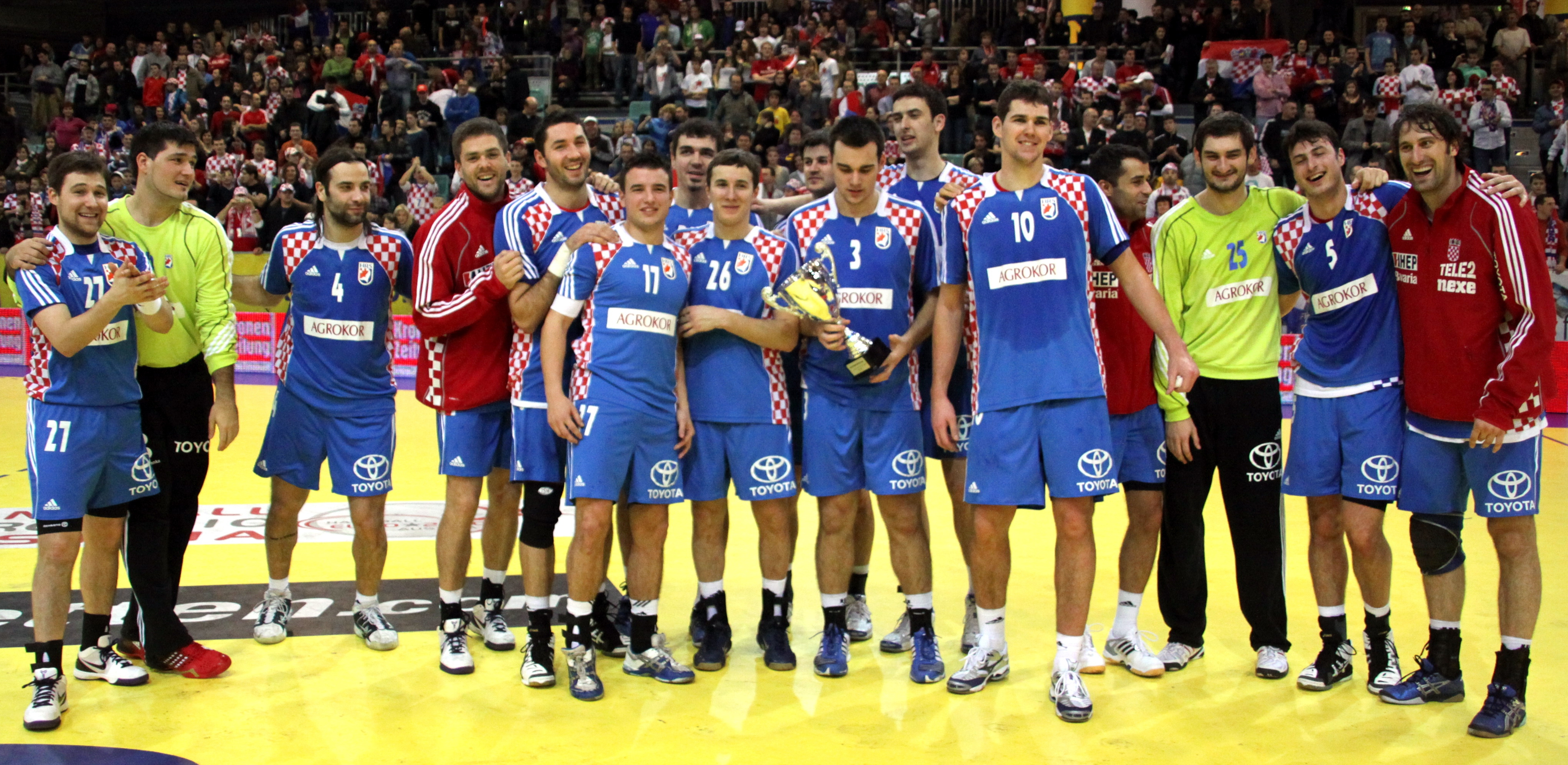
The Croatian national handball team in 2010

Some of Croatia's more successful national teams include:

- Croatia national football team
- Croatia women's national football team
- Croatia men's national handball team
- Croatia national basketball team
- Croatia Davis Cup team
- Croatia national water polo team
- Croatia women's national volleyball team
- Croatia national cricket team
- Croatia national beach handball team
- Croatia women's national beach handball team
- Croatia national baseball team
- Croatia women's national basketball team
- Croatia national futsal team
- Croatia women's national handball team
- Croatia men's national ice hockey team
- Croatia women's national ice hockey team
- Croatia national rugby union team
- Croatia national speedway team
- Croatia Fed Cup team
- Croatia Hopman Cup team
- Croatia men's national volleyball team
- Croatia national ski jumping team

== Achievements ==
Competitions
×	International	International	International	Club	Club
Football	Olympic Games; N/A men/women	World Cup; 3rd (2022) 2nd (2018) 3rd (1998) men || European Championship; Quarter Finals (1996 & 2008) men || Champion's League; Quarterfinals (HNK Hajduk Split in 1994/1995) men || Inter-Cities Fairs Cup; Champion (Dinamo Zagreb) men			
Handball	Olympic Games; Champion (2) men	World Championship; Champion men	European Championship; 2nd (2) men	Champion's League; Champion (4) men (3) / women (1)	Cup Winners' Cup; Champion (3) women
Basketball	Olympic Games; 2nd men	World Championship; 3rd men	Eurobasket; 3rd (2) men	Euroleague; Champion (5) men	ABA League; Champion (2) men
Water Polo	Olympic Games; Champion men	World Championship; Champion (2) men	European Championship; Champion men	LEN Euroleague; Champion (13) men	LEN Cup; Champion (2) men
Volleyball	Olympic Games; 7th women	World Championship; 6th women	European Championship; 2nd (3) women	CEV Champions League; Champion women	CEV Challenge Cup; 2nd men
Tennis	Olympic Games (doubles); Champions men	Davis Cup; Champion (2) men	World Team Cup; Champion men	N/A	N/A

== Olympic Games ==
Croatia has participated in the following Summer Olympic Games to date:

- Croatia at the 1992 Summer Olympics
- Croatia at the 1996 Summer Olympics
- Croatia at the 2000 Summer Olympics
- Croatia at the 2004 Summer Olympics
- Croatia at the 2008 Summer Olympics
- Croatia at the 2012 Summer Olympics
- Croatia at the 2016 Summer Olympics
- Croatia at the 2020 Summer Olympics
- Croatia at the 2024 Summer Olympics

Croatia has participated in the following Winter Olympic Games to date:

- Croatia at the 1992 Winter Olympics
- Croatia at the 1994 Winter Olympics
- Croatia at the 1998 Winter Olympics
- Croatia at the 2002 Winter Olympics
- Croatia at the 2006 Winter Olympics
- Croatia at the 2010 Winter Olympics
- Croatia at the 2014 Winter Olympics
- Croatia at the 2018 Winter Olympics
- Croatia at the 2022 Winter Olympics

== Hostings of international sporting events ==
Croatia has hosted many international sporting events. Until 1992 Croatia hosted the events as a part of Yugoslavia.

=== Alpine skiing ===
Zagreb (Sljeme) has organized many FIS races apart from the World Cup races held every year from 2005. The first ever FIS alpine ski race was held in 1995 and included 94 racers from 7 different countries.

- Snow Queen Trophy (2005—; part of the FIS Alpine Ski World Cup): Zagreb (Sljeme)
- Adriatic Slalom (2006–2011; from 2006 to 2009 a FIS race, in 2010 and 2011 part of the FIS Alpine Ski European Cup): Rijeka (Platak)

=== Artistic gymnastics ===
- Žito Challenge Cup (Grand prix Osijek) (2009—): Osijek
- 1982 Artistic Gymnastics World Cup Final: Zagreb

=== Aquatics ===
- 1981 European Aquatics Championships: Split
- 2008 European Short Course Swimming Championships: Rijeka
- 2010 Men's European Water Polo Championship: Zagreb
- 2010 Women's European Water Polo Championship: Zagreb

=== Athletics ===
- Hanžeković Memorial (1951—): Zagreb
- Terry Fox Run (2000—): Zagreb
- Slobodna Dalmacija Women's High Jump Meeting (2007–2011): Split
  - In 2010 the meeting was one of the most visited indoor events in the history of the sport with some 11 000 spectators cheering mainly for Blanka Vlašić. In 2011 the meeting was held outdoors, on the Riva, the Split's waterfront, to make it more interesting. The meeting was not held in 2012 and 2013 due to Blanka Vlašić's injury.
- 1981 European Cup Super League Finals: Zagreb
- 1989 European Athletics Junior Championships: Varaždin
- 1990 European Athletics Championships: Split
- 2002 European Cup Winter Throwing: Pula
- 2002 European Cross Country Championships: Medulin
- 2008 European Cup Winter Throwing: Split (Stadion Park mladeži)
- 2010 IAAF Continental Cup: Split
- 2013 Balkan Veterans Athletic Championship: Zagreb (Sports park of Mladost)

=== Australian football ===
- 2009 EU Cup Australian rules football: Samobor

=== Basketball ===
- 1970 FIBA World Championship: Split, Karlovac (parts of the competition were also held in Sarajevo, Skopje and Ljubljana)
- 1972 FIBA Europe Under-18 Championship: Zadar
- 1975 Eurobakset: Split, Karlovac, Rijeka (the final round was played in Belgrade)
- 1978–79 FIBA European Cup Winner's Cup Finals: Poreč
- 1989 Eurobasket: Zagreb
- 2000 FIBA Europe Under-18 Championship: Zadar
- 2001 FIBA Under-21 World Championship for Women: Šibenik
- 2002 FIBA Europe Under-20 Championship for Women: Zagreb
- 2003–04 ABA Goodyear League Final Four: Zagreb (Dražen Petrović Basketball Hall)
- 2009–10 ABA NLB League Final Four: Zagreb (Arena Zagreb)
- 2010 FIBA Europe Under-20 Championship: Zadar, Crikvenica, Makarska
- 2013 FIBA Europe Under-18 Championship for Women: Vinkovci, Vukovar

=== Beach handball ===
- 2011 European Beach Handball Championship: Umag (ITC Stella Maris)

=== Boxing ===
- 2004 European Amateur Boxing Championship: Pula

=== Canoeing and kayaking ===
- 1999 Canoe Sprint European Championship: Zagreb
- 2012 Canoe Sprint European Championship: Zagreb

=== Chess ===
- 2010 European Individual Chess Championship: Rijeka

=== Cycling ===
- Tour of Croatia (2015—)

=== Darts ===
- 2009 World Dart Championship: Zadar (Krešimir Ćosić Hall)
- 2009 European Dart Championship: Zadar (Krešimir Ćosić Hall)

=== Fencing ===
- 2013 European Fencing Championship: Zagreb

=== Figure skating ===
- Zagreb Snowflakes Trophy (2001—): Zagreb
- 1974 European Figure Skating Championship: Zagreb
- 1979 European Figure Skating Championship: Zagreb
- 1999 World Junior Figure Skating Championship: Zagreb
- 2004 World Synchronized Skating Championship: Zagreb
- 2008 European Figure Skating Championship: Zagreb
- 2009 World Synchronized Skating Championship: Zagreb
- 2013 European Figure Skating Championship: Zagreb

=== Football ===
- 1976 UEFA European Football Championship: Zagreb (Maksimir Stadium; the second semi-final and the final were played in Belgrade)
- 2009 UEFA Regions' Cup: Zagreb (Stadion Lučko), Vrbovec, Velika Gorica, Samobor, Jastrebarsko, Zaprešić (Stadion ŠRC Zaprešić)

=== Futsal ===
- Kutija šibica (1970—): Zagreb (Dom sportova, Sports Hall Trešnjevka, Sports Hall Trnsko, Sports Hall Peščenica)
- 2012 UEFA Futsal Championship: Split (Spaladium Arena), Zagreb (Arena Zagreb)

=== Handball ===
- 1957 World Women's Handball Championship: Virovitica (part of the competition was also played in Belgrade)
- 2000 European Men's Handball Championship: Zagreb (Dom sportova), Rijeka (Dvorana mladosti)
- 2003 World Women's Handball Championship: Split, Poreč, Karlovac, Čakovec, Zagreb, Rijeka
- 2009 World Men's Handball Championship: Split, Zadar, Osijek, Varaždin, Poreč, Zagreb, Pula
- 2011–12 SEHA League Final Four: Zagreb (Arena Zagreb)
- 2014 Women's Junior World Handball Championship:
- 2014 European Women's Handball Championship: Poreč, Varaždin, Zagreb (the competition will be jointly-hosted with Hungary)

=== Ice hockey ===
- 2005 Ice Hockey World Championship Division II Group A: Zagreb
- 2007 Ice Hockey World Championship Division II Group A: Zagreb
- 2011 Ice Hockey World Championship Division II Group B: Zagreb
- 2013 Ice Hockey World Championship Division II Group A: Zagreb

=== Judo ===
- Rijeka Grand Prix (IJF World Judo Tour; 2013): Rijeka (Centar Zamet)

=== Motorsport ===
- Croatia Rally (1974—; part of the European Rally Championship)
- 2013 European Hill Climb Championship: Buzet
- 2013 Individual Speedway European Championship: Donji Kraljevec

=== Picigin ===
- Picigin World Championship (2005—): Split

=== Sailing ===
- 1996 Open Match Racing World Championship: Dubrovnik
- 2000 Open Match Racing World Championship: Split
- 2004 470 World Championship: Zadar
- 2006 Finn Gold Cup: Split
- 2011 Youth Sailing World Championship: Zadar
- 2012 49er World Championship: Zadar
- 2013 Formula Windsurfing World Championship: Viganj

=== Shooting ===
- 1985 European Shooting Championship: Osijek
- 1989 European Shooting Championship: Zagreb
- 2001 European Shooting Championship: Zagreb
- 2003 ISSF World Cup: Zagreb
- 2006 ISSF World Shooting Championship: Zagreb
- 2009 European Shooting Championship: Osijek
- 2013 European Shooting Championship: Osijek

=== Tennis ===
- ATP Vegeta Croatia Open (1990—): Umag
- Zagreb Indoors (1996—): Zagreb

=== Volleyball (indoor) ===
- 2001 FIVB Girls Youth World Championship: Pula
- 2005 Women's European Volleyball Championship: Pula, Zagreb

=== Wrestling ===
- 2025 World Championship: Zagreb

=== Multi-sport events ===
- 1971 Balkan Games: Zagreb
- 1979 Mediterranean Games: Split
- 1987 Summer Universiade: Zagreb
- 1999 Military World Games: Zagreb (Stadion Maksimir)
- Sportske igre mladih ('Youth Sports Games'): Split
- Croatian World Games: Zadar (2006, 2010) and Zagreb (2014, 2017, 2023)
- 2016 European University Games: Zagreb, Rijeka
