= List of national ski-jumping records =

This is the list of national ski-jumping records.

== List by country ==
=== Unofficial Red Bull promo event ===
Longest ever standing distance not recognized as official WR; this one time promo event wasn't in accordance with FIS rules.

Nation	Athlete	Metres	Feet	Place	Year	Source
Japan	Ryōyū Kobayashi (PROMO)	291.0	955	Hlíðarfjall	2024	

=== Men ===
Nation	Athlete	Metres	Feet	Place	Year	Source
Slovenia	Domen Prevc	254.5	834	Planica	2025	
Austria	Stefan Kraft	253.5	831	Vikersund	2017	
Norway	Robert Johansson	252.0	827	Vikersund	2017	
Japan	Ryōyū Kobayashi	252.0	827	Planica	2019	
Poland	Kamil Stoch	251.5	825	Planica	2017	
Germany	Markus Eisenbichler	248.0	814	Planica	2017	
United States	Kevin Bickner	244.5	802	Vikersund	2017	
Finland	Janne Happonen	240.0	787	Vikersund	2011	
Switzerland	Simon Ammann	239.5	785	Vikersund	2017	
Russia	Evgeni Klimov	237.0	778	Planica	2020	
Czech Republic	Antonín Hájek	236.0	774	Planica	2010	
Slovakia	Hektor Kapustik	235.5	773	Vikersund	2026	
Italy	Alex Insam	234.0	767	Planica	2025	
France	Valentin Foubert	229.0	756	Planica	2026	
Ukraine	Yevhen Marusiak	228.5	750	Planica	2024	
Estonia	Artti Aigro	227.5	746	Planica	2025	
Canada	Mackenzie Boyd-Clowes	224.0	735	Planica	2016	
Kazakhstan	Ilya Mizernykh	219.0	719	Kulm	2026	
Bulgaria	Vladimir Zografski	215.0	705	Planica	2025	
Turkey	Muhammed Ali Bedir	212.5	697	Kulm	2023	
Sweden	Isak Grimholm	207.5	681	Planica	2007	
South Korea	Choi Heung-chul	207.5	681	Planica	2008	
Belarus	Petr Chaadaev	197.5	648	Kulm	2006	
Netherlands	Boy van Baarle	197.0	646	Kulm	2005	
Greece	Nico Polychronidis	186.0	610	Oberstdorf	2013	
Romania	Daniel Andrei Cacina	169.5	556	Planica	2025	
Georgia (Note: Part of the Soviet Union at the time.)	Koba Tsakadze	142.0	466	Vikersund	1967	
Spain	Bernat Sola	141.0	463	Tauplitz	1986	
Hungary	Gábor Gellér	139.0	456	Harrachov	1980	
Denmark	Andreas Bjelke Nygaard	137.0	449	Lillehammer	2000s	
Great Britain	Sam Bolton	134.5	441	Whistler	2019	
China	Song Qiwu	131	430	Zhangjiakou	2026	
Latvia	Kristaps Nežborts	127.0	416	Predazzo	2013	
Kyrgyzstan	Dmitry Chvykov	124.0	407	Innsbruck	2002	
Azerbaijan	Zakhir Dzhafarov	105.5	346	Klingenthal	2026	
Iceland	Anton Øyvindsson	94.5	310	Oslo	2020	
Thailand	Korawik Saendee	87.0	285	Rovaniemi	2023	
Lithuania	Zbigniew Kiwert	86.0	282	Nizhny Novgorod	1960	
Croatia	Urban Zamernik	82.0	269	Hinterzarten	2010	
Serbia	Nikola Stevanović	65.0	213	Planica	2018	
Andorra	Tomás Cano	64.5	212	La Molina	1992	
North Macedonia (Note: Part of Yugoslavia at the time.)	Goga Popov junior	62.0	203	Planica	1952	
Belgium	Sebastiaan Haven	62.0	203	Höhnhart	2026	
Australia	Bruce Neville	57.5	188	Westby	1997	
Liechtenstein	Norbert Frick	54.5	178	Riezlern	1981	
Uganda	Dunstan Odeke	50.0	164	Oslo	1990s	
Montenegro	Božo Čvorović	46.0	151	Žabljak	1962	
Greenland	Hans Holm	45.0	147	Oslo	1956	
Chile	Alfredo Aliaga	30.0	98	Farellones	1955	
Argentina	Luis de Ridder	25.0	82	Farellones	1954	
New Zealand	Brian MacMillan	18.6	61	Mount Cook	1937	

=== Women ===
Nation	Athlete	Metres	Feet	Place	Year	Source
Slovenia	Nika Prevc	242.5	796	Planica	2026	
Norway	Anna Odine Stroem	235.5	773	Vikersund	2026	
Japan	Ringo Miyajima	228.5	750	Vikersund	2026	
Germany	Selina Freitag	227.5	746	Vikersund	2026	
Canada	Alexandria Loutitt	225.0	738	Vikersund	2023	
Sweden	Frida Westman	225.0	738	Vikersund	2026	
Finland	Jenny Rautionaho	218.5	717	Vikersund	2026	
Austria	Lisa Eder	205.5	674	Vikersund	2025	
Italy	Annika Sieff	196.5	472	Vikersund	2026	
France	Joséphine Pagnier	181.0	512	Vikersund	2024	
United States	Annika Belshaw	178.0	584	Vikersund	2026	
Poland	Anna Twardosz	172.5	439	Vikersund	2026	
Russia	Aleksandra Kustova	150.0	492	Willingen	2022	
China	Chang Xinyue	125.0	410	Lillehammer	2017	
Czech Republic	Klára Ulrichová	124.5	408	Wisla	2021	
Romania	Daniela Haralambie	123.5	405	Lillehammer	2019	
Kazakhstan	Valentina Sderzhikova	120.5	395	Chaikovskiy	2018	
Switzerland	Emely Torazza	113.0	371	Klingenthal	2022	
Slovakia	Kira Mária Kapustíková	112.5	369	Lillehammer	2024	
Hungary	Virág Vörös	112.0	367	Planica	2019	
Netherlands	Wendy Vuik	107.0	351	Oslo	2013	
South Korea	Park Guy-lim	107.0	351	Lillehammer	2019	
Ukraine	Tetiana Pylypchuk	101.5	333	Wisla	2022	
Estonia	Annemarii Bendi	94.0	308	Otepää	2019	
Great Britain	Mani Cooper	81.5	267	Seefeld	2021	
Latvia	Aelita Krasilscikova	87.5	243	Eisenerz	2025	
Georgia	Esmeralda Gobozova	66.0	217	Prémanon	2020	
