= Péter Kelemen =

Péter Kelemen may refer to:

- Péter Kelemen (pentathlete)
- Péter Kelemen (ski jumper)
