= Van Baarle =

Van Baarle is a surname. Notable people with the surname include:

- Boy van Baarle (born 1983), Dutch former ski jumper and ski jumping coach
- Dylan van Baarle (born 1992), Dutch cyclist
- Mario van Baarle (born 1965), Dutch cyclist
- Stephan van Baarle (born 1991), Dutch politician

== See also ==
- Baarle
