= Péter Kelemen (ski jumper) =

Hungarian ski jumper

Péter Kelemen (born 6 February 1999 in Szombathely) is a retired Hungarian ski jumper, who represented the Kőszegi SE club. He competed at the World Championships, Junior World Championships, and the 2015 European Youth Olympic Festival. He won two bronze medals at the Hungarian national championships in 2015 and earned medals in junior categories.

== Personal life ==
Kelemen was born in Szombathely and resided in Kőszeg as of 2016. His younger brothers, Dávid and Zalán, and his father, Tamás, are also ski jumpers. His grandfather, Zoltán Kelemen, represented Hungary internationally and won the national championship in 1980.

== Career ==
=== Early years (up to 2013) ===
Kelemen competed in international children's competitions from a young age, participating in events like the Alpe Adria Kinder Tournee and the Children's Four Hills Tournament. His best result was fourth place in the 9–11 age category at an international event in Bad Freienwalde in August 2008, surpassing two Germans and one Bulgarian.

In July 2011, he competed at the unofficial Children's World Championships in Garmisch-Partenkirchen. In the under-12 individual event, he placed 25th, ahead of one jumper each from Germany, Italy, and Latvia. In the team event for the same age group, alongside Hungarians Kristóf Molnár and Bálint Haiszán, he finished 19th, ahead of Italy's second team and a two-person Estonian team – Kevin Maltsev and Taavi Pappel.

In August 2012, he participated in the FIS Youth Cup in Hinterzarten for athletes born in 1998 or later, finishing 42nd, ahead of two Hungarians, one Czech, and one South Korean. He also won medals at Hungarian junior national championships.

=== 2013–14 season ===
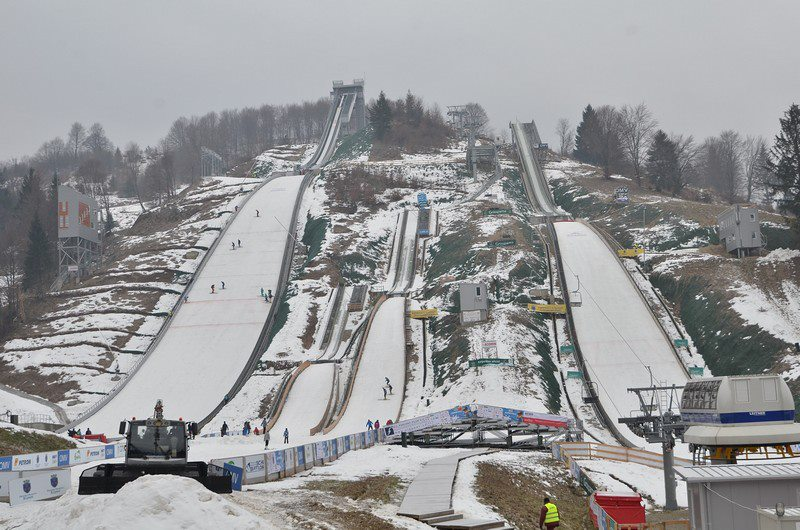
Râșnov Ski Jump, where Kelemen earned his only FIS-level points in the Carpath Cup

In October 2013, Kelemen won the under-15 category at the VI Chernel Kupa in Kőszeg, defeating only Hungarians Tamás Reymeyer and Kristóf Molnár.

In February 2014, he debuted in official FIS competitions in Râșnov, Romania, competing in two Carpath Cup and two FIS Cup events. In the first Carpath Cup event, he placed 29th, ahead of three Kazakhs, one Hungarian, and one Bulgarian. The next day, he finished 27th, surpassing four Kazakhs, one Romanian, one Hungarian, one Bulgarian, and one Russian. These were his only FIS-level events where he scored points, earning 6 points and finishing 51st in the 2013–14 Carpath Cup overall standings. In the subsequent FIS Cup events, he placed 41st, ahead of two Kazakhs, and 39th, ahead of two Kazakhs and one Hungarian. These were his final international appearances in the 2013–14 season.

=== 2014–15 season ===
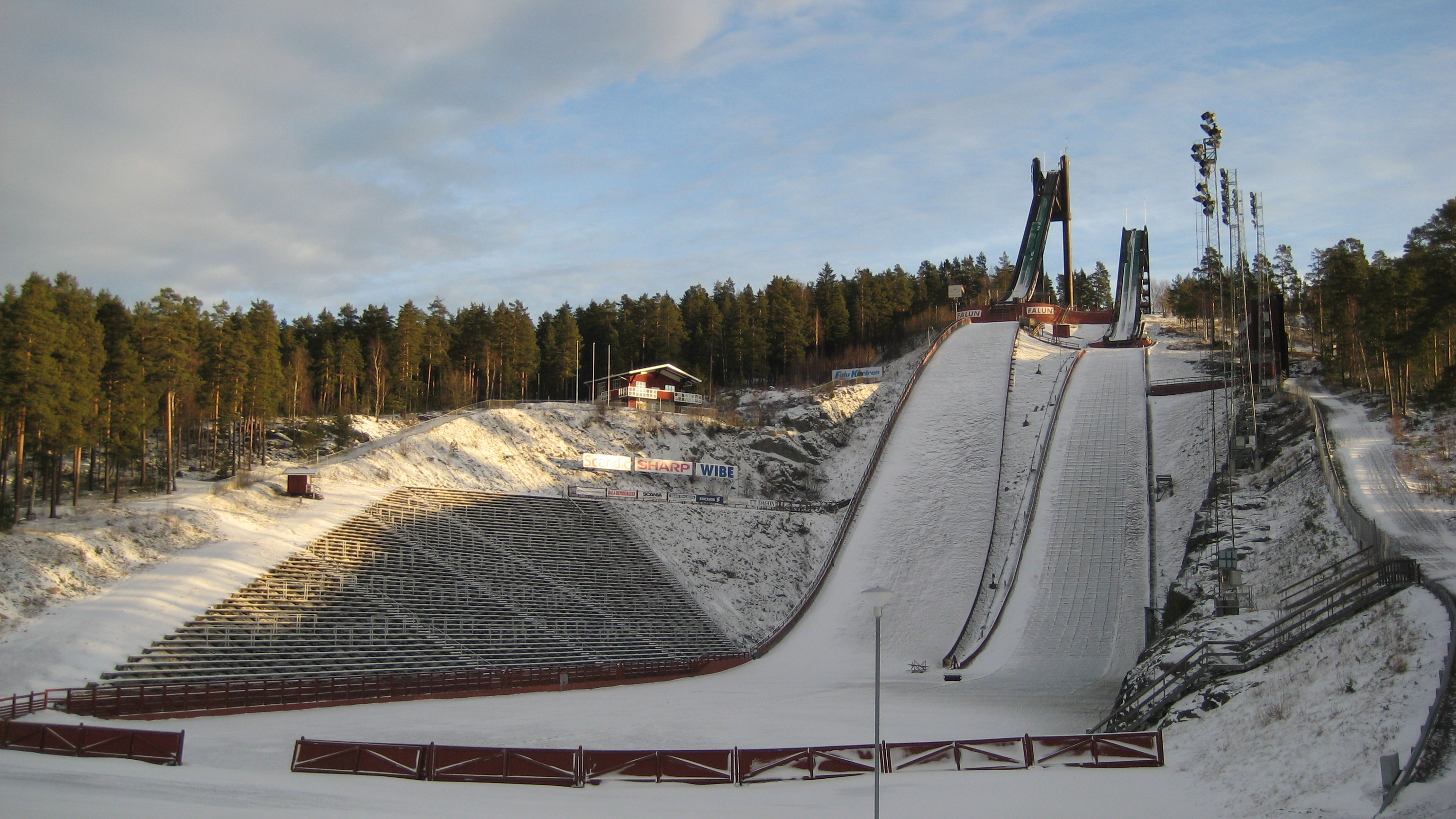
Lugnet complex in Falun, where Kelemen failed to qualify for the men's individual event on the normal hill at the 2015 World Championships

In August 2014, Kelemen competed in a FIS Cup event in Hinterzarten, finishing last in 68th place. He was listed for another FIS Cup event the next day but did not compete.

In late January 2015, he competed in the boys' individual event at the 2015 European Youth Olympic Winter Festival in Tschagguns, Austria, finishing 50th with a 64-metre jump, ahead of Bulgaria's Ewelin Mitew and Sweden's Kevin Berg.

In February 2015, at the 2015 Junior World Championships in Almaty, Kazakhstan, he placed last in 64th with a 59-metre jump, trailing Georgia's Artur Sarkisiani by 25.5 points.

Kelemen, the second Hungarian ski jumper in the 21st century after Ákos Szilágyi, was entered into the FIS Nordic World Ski Championships 2015 in Falun, Sweden, alongside Hungarian female jumper Virág Vörös. In the men's individual qualification on the normal hill, his 56-metre jump placed him last in 59th, 5.3 points behind Ukraine's Stepan Pasicznyk. He was the second-youngest competitor, behind Kazakhstan's Sergey Tkachenko. This was his final international event of the 2014–15 season.

=== 2015–16 season ===
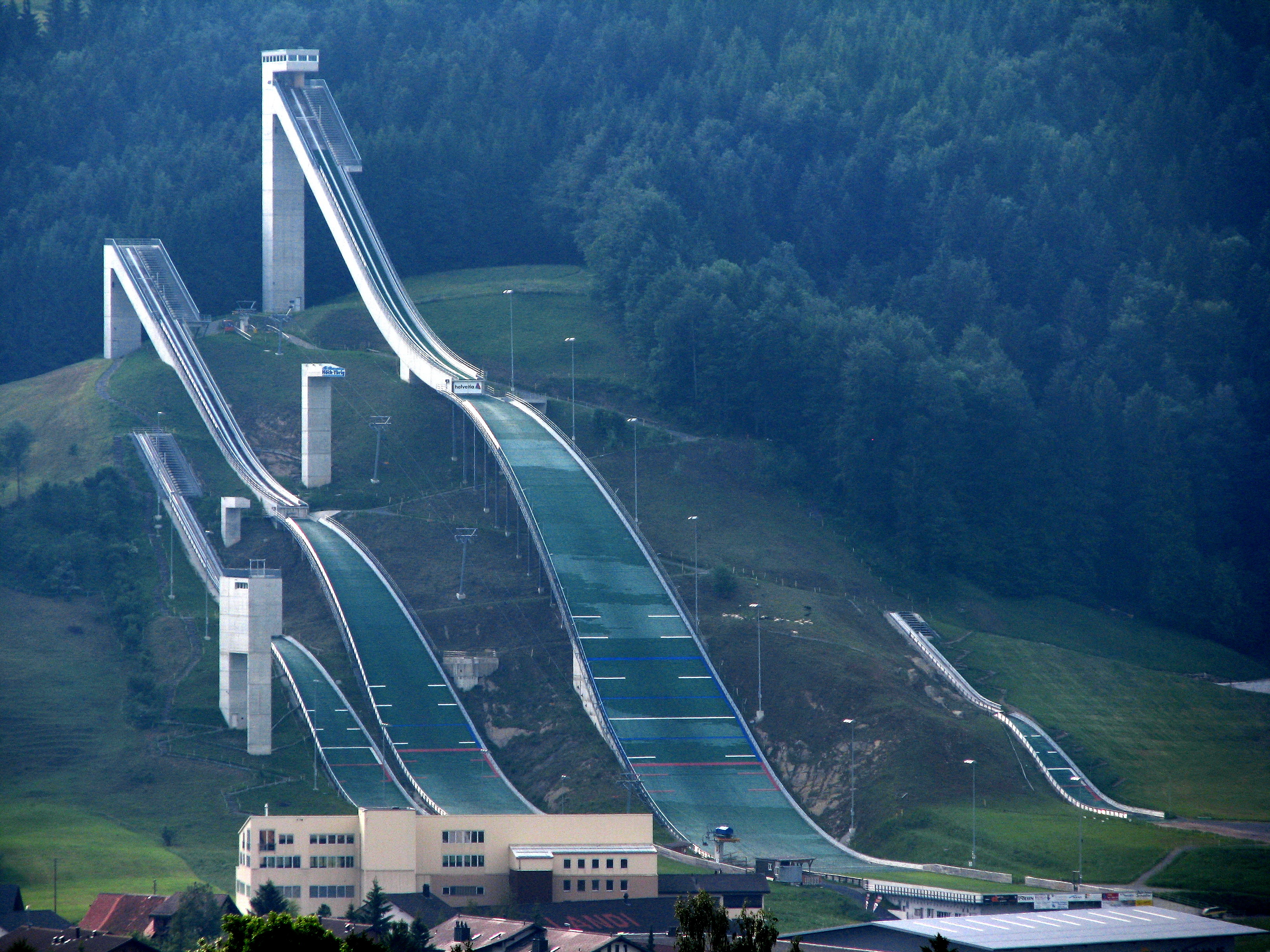
Schanzen Einsiedeln complex, where Kelemen competed in his final FIS-level event on the Andreas Küttel-Schanze

In August 2015, Kelemen competed in FIS Cup events in Szczyrk, Poland, placing 78th in the first event, ahead of one Slovak, one Hungarian, and one Ukrainian, and 75th in the second, ahead of three Hungarians, one Slovak, and one Bulgarian. In September 2015, he competed in two FIS Cup events in Einsiedeln, Switzerland, finishing last in 71st in both. The 13 September event was his final FIS-level international competition.

On 30 October 2015, at the 2015 Hungarian Ski Jumping Championships in Planica, Kelemen won bronze medals in individual events on the K-56 and K-72 hills, finishing behind Kristóf Molnár (first in both) and Flórián Molnár (second in both).

In February 2016, Kelemen was named to Hungary's team for the 2016 Junior World Championships, but he and other Hungarians were not entered.

After the 2015–16 season, Kelemen retired from ski jumping, citing a lack of progress and satisfaction.

== World Championships ==
=== Individual ===
Event	Team	Place
2015 (Sweden) Falun	–	Did not qualify

=== Detailed World Championship results ===
Rank	Date	Year	Location	Hill	K-Point	Hill size	Event	Jump 1	Jump 2	Points	Deficit	Winner
NQ	21 February	2015	(Sweden) Falun	Lugnet	K-90	HS-100	Individual	56.0 m	–	34.7	–	Did not qualify

== Junior World Championships ==
=== Individual ===
Event	Team	Place
2015 (Kazakhstan) Almaty	–	64th

=== Detailed Junior World Championship results ===
Rank	Date	Year	Location	Hill	K-Point	Hill size	Event	Jump 1	Jump 2	Points	Deficit	Winner
64	5 February	2015	(Kazakhstan) Almaty	Sunkar International Ski Jumping Complex	K-95	HS-106	Individual	59.0 m	–	33.5	236.4	Johann André Forfang

== European Youth Olympic Festival ==
=== Individual ===
Event	Team	Place
2015 (Austria) Tschagguns	–	50th

=== Detailed European Youth Olympic Festival results ===
Rank	Date	Year	Location	Hill	K-Point	Hill size	Event	Jump 1	Jump 2	Points	Deficit	Winner
50	27 January	2015	(Austria) Tschagguns	Montafoner Schanzenzentrum	K-97	HS-108	Individual	64.0 m	–	54.0	217.3	Niko Kytösaho

== FIS Cup ==
=== FIS Cup event results ===
Source
2013–14 season
Villach	Villach	Szczyrk	Szczyrk	Kuopio	Kuopio	Kranj	Kranj	Zakopane	Zakopane	Frenštát	Frenštát	Einsiedeln	Einsiedeln	Râșnov	Râșnov	Notodden	Notodden	Brattleboro	Brattleboro	Râșnov	Râșnov	Zakopane	Zakopane	points		
-	-	-	-	-	-	-	-	-	-	-	-	-	-	-	-	-	-	-	-	41	39	-	-	0		
2014–15 season
Villach	Villach	Hinterzarten	Hinterzarten	Kuopio	Kuopio	Einsiedeln	Einsiedeln	Planica	Planica	Szczyrk	Szczyrk	Râșnov	Râșnov	Notodden	Notodden	Szczyrbskie Jezioro	Zakopane	Zakopane	Kranj	Kranj	Brattleboro	Brattleboro	Lake Placid	Hinterzarten	Hinterzarten	points
-	-	68	-	-	-	-	-	-	-	-	-	-	-	-	-	-	-	-	-	-	-	-	-	-	-	0
2015–16 season
Villach	Villach	Kuopio	Kuopio	Szczyrk	Szczyrk	Einsiedeln	Einsiedeln	Râșnov	Râșnov	Notodden	Notodden	Zakopane	Zakopane	Pjongczang	Pjongczang	Whistler	Whistler	Eau Claire	Eau Claire	Planica	Planica	Harrachov	Harrachov	points		
-	-	-	-	78	75	71	71	-	-	-	-	-	-	-	-	-	-	-	-	-	-	-	-	0		
Legend
1 2 3 4-10 11-30 below 30 dq – disqualified: − did not compete
