= Filip Mihaljević =

Filip Mihaljević may refer to:

- Filip Mihaljević (shot putter) (born 1994), Croatian discus thrower and shot putter
- Filip Mihaljević (footballer, born 1992), Croatian football forward
- Filip Mihaljević (footballer, born 2000), Croatian football midfielder
