= Sam Bolton =

British ski jumper (born 2002)

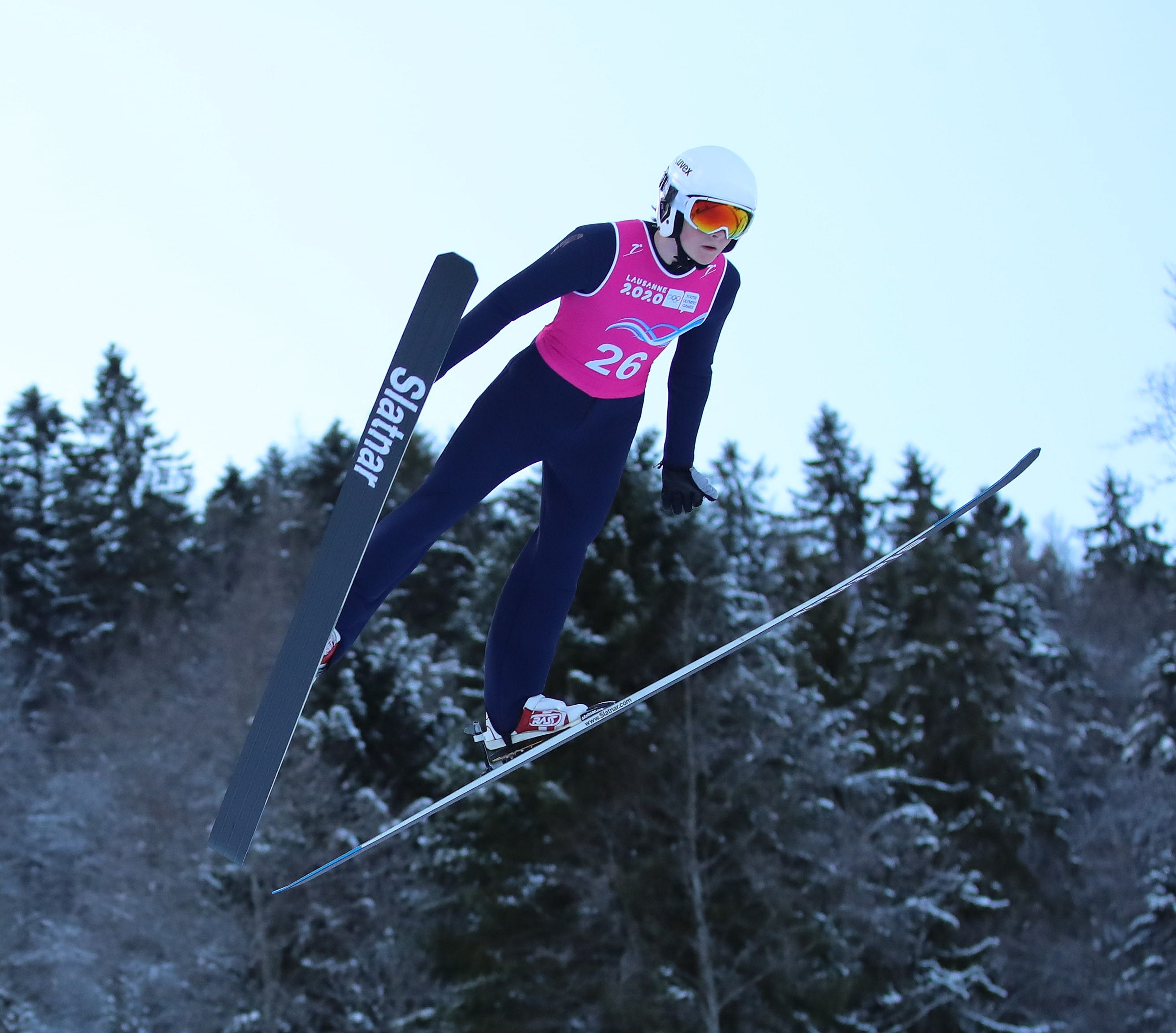
- Sam Bolton at the 2020 Winter Youth Olympics
- Born: Sam Adams Bolton; 9 December 2002 (age 23); Halifax, West Yorkshire, England
- Occupation: Ski jumper

Sam Adams Bolton (born 9 December 2002) is a British ski jumper and current national record holder.

Bolton was born in Halifax, West Yorkshire, England and moved to Calgary, Canada at the age of five. After initially playing hockey, Bolton discovered ski jumping whilst taking part in a summer camp at Calgary's Winsport facility in 2011. Following a development career in North America, competing in FIS Race, FIS Cup and Continental Cup series competitions, he now predominantly trains and competes in competitions in Europe.

== British record ==
Bolton set the current British record at the age of 16 on the large hill (HS140) at Whistler Olympic Park, Canada on 17 March 2019, when he jumped 134.50m to finish second in the FIS NORAM tournament. His second jump in that competition (119.50m) equalled the second longest jump by a British jumper in any FIS competition.

== Youth Olympics ==
Sam Bolton took part in the 2020 Winter Youth Olympics and finished 18th.
