= Tomás Cano =

Spanish and Andorran ski jumper

Personal information
- Born: January 4, 1961 (age 65)

Sport
- Sport: Skiing
Medal record
Representing Spain
King's Cup
Silver medal – second place	1981	2nd

Tomás Cano (born 4 January 1961) is a Spanish and Andorran ski jumper who competed primarily for Spain. He holds the Andorran national record and is a former Spanish national record holder in ski jumping. Cano achieved 2nd place in the King's Cup in 1981 and was a Spanish national champion.

From 1979 to 1983, he competed in the World Cup but never earned points in the overall standings, with his best result being 48th place. He participated in the Four Hills Tournament three times, with his highest finish being 72nd in the 27th edition, which was not yet part of the World Cup. He also competed in the 1982 World Championships, finishing 56th on the normal hill and 48th on the large hill. Cano participated in the Junior World Championships and the FISU World University Games without notable success. He earned points in several Europa Cup events.

Cano was the only Andorran representative in official international competitions, earning one point for Andorra in the European Cup in 1992 at La Molina.

He used skis manufactured by Elan.

== Career ==
=== Spain ===
==== Early career and first competitions ====
Originally from Elche, Cano later moved to Catalonia. As a student, he trained primarily on Swiss and Spanish ski jumps. One of his earliest international competitions was the Grand Prix in Frenštát pod Radhoštěm, Czechoslovakia, on 11 September 1977, where he finished last in 93rd place with two 50-meter jumps, earning the lowest score of the event. The winner was František Novák.

In 1978, Cano competed in the Junior World Championships in Murau, finishing 46th out of 52 competitors with jumps of 49 and 57 meters on the normal hill. He also competed in the 1979 Junior World Championships in Canada, placing 44th on the normal hill, ahead of only three classified competitors. A week earlier, in Lake Placid, he finished last in 48th place with jumps of 70 and 69 meters, where Pentti Kokkonen won.

Cano was the first Spaniard to compete in the Four Hills Tournament, participating in the 1978–79 season. He placed in the bottom eight in all events: 77th in Oberstdorf, 77th in Garmisch-Partenkirchen (the lowest score), 74th in Innsbruck, and 72nd in Bischofshofen, the second-to-last position. He scored 359.8 points, finishing 72nd out of 84 competitors in the overall standings.

On 25 March 1979, during a canceled round of the King's Cup in La Molina, Cano set a La Molina ski jump record of 70 meters. In the restarted round, he jumped 55 meters, finishing 19th, while Norwegian Johan Sætre broke his record and won the event.

Cano debuted in the World Cup on 30 December 1979 in Oberstdorf during the Four Hills Tournament, jumping 85 meters and finishing 94th. This jump set a Spanish national record, likely surpassed in 1982 by José Rivera, who jumped 94.5 meters in Oberstdorf. In 1978 or 1979, Cano won the Spanish national championship.

==== 1980s ====
In 1980, Cano began the year with a Four Hills Tournament event in Garmisch-Partenkirchen, jumping 72 meters and finishing 98th. In the subsequent events, he placed 105th and 104th, finishing 101st overall with 235.3 points, ahead of 14 competitors.

On 27 February 1980, he competed in the World Cup in St. Moritz, placing 53rd with jumps of 65 and 75.5 meters. Two days later, in Gstaad, he finished 57th (66.5 and 71 meters), and on 2 March in Engelberg, he placed 61st (80 and 74 meters). That winter, he finished 6th in the King's Cup with 192.4 points. In September, he competed again in Frenštát pod Radhoštěm, finishing 54th.

The 1980–81 season began with World Cup events in Switzerland, where Cano placed 69th, 77th, and 67th, jumping 66, 61, and 72 meters, respectively. In early February 1981, he achieved a career highlight by finishing 2nd in the King's Cup with jumps of 69.5 and 67 meters, earning 20 points in the Europa Cup (predecessor to the Continental Cup), his only podium in this series.

In late February 1981, Cano competed in the 1981 Winter Universiade, finishing 13th in the ski jumping event at Valle de Astún Ski Jump with jumps of 71 and 69 meters among 16 competitors. That winter, he also won the Catalonia ski jumping championship with jumps of 51.9 and 62.7 meters.

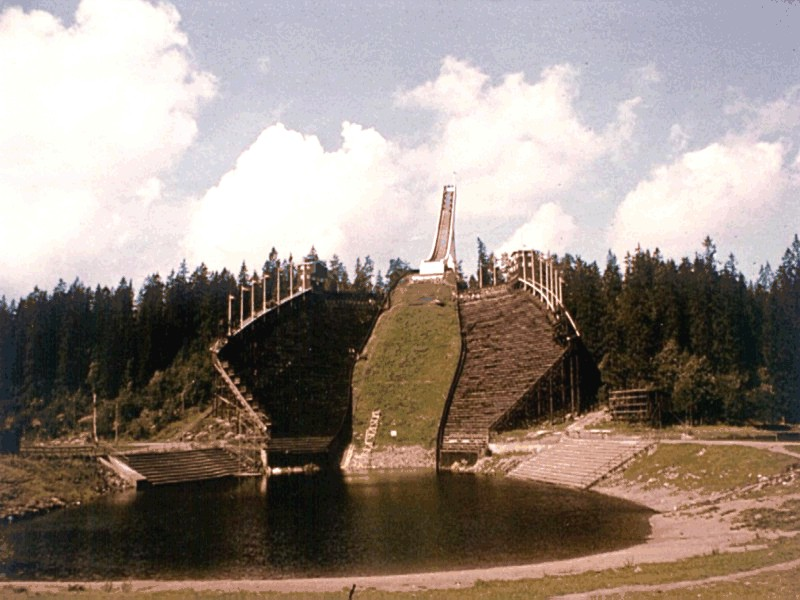
Holmenkollbakken in the summer of 1975. Cano achieved his best World Cup result (48th place) on this hill in 1982

In the 1981–82 season, Cano competed sparingly. In the European Cup, he placed 53rd in Seefeld and 11th in La Molina. At the 1982 World Championships, he finished 56th on the normal hill (63.5 and 67 meters, 165.5 points) and 48th on the large hill (82.5 and 84.5 meters, 168.8 points), events that were also part of the World Cup.

In the 1982–83 season, Cano had his most active international season. On 18 December 1982, he placed 50th in the World Cup in Cortina d'Ampezzo with a 66-meter jump. On 26 December, he finished 57th in the European Cup in St. Moritz. He competed in the Four Hills Tournament for the third and final time, placing 77th in Oberstdorf (90.5 meters), 78th in Garmisch-Partenkirchen (80 meters), 88th in Innsbruck (72 meters), and 82nd in Bischofshofen (72 meters), finishing 78th overall with 291.8 points among 95 competitors. In four additional World Cup events in North America, his best result was 55th in Lake Placid on 15 January 1983.

In the European Cup, he competed in over 10 events, earning points twice: 9th in Saint-Nizier and 11th in La Molina. He was close to scoring in Chamonix, finishing 16th. His final event of the season was on 3 April in Feldberg, where he placed 36th with jumps of 77 and 75.5 meters.

In 1987, he finished 18th in the King's Cup in La Molina.

=== Andorra ===
Representing Andorra, Cano competed in the King's Cup on 3 February 1991, finishing 33rd out of 41 competitors with jumps of 58.5 and 60 meters. In 1992, he placed 15th in the same event with jumps of 60.5 and 60 meters, earning 145.9 points and one point for Andorra in the European Cup standings. In the 1992 Spanish Championships, competing as an Andorran, he finished 4th with jumps of 64.5 and 62.5 meters, trailing medalists Bernat Sola, Francisco Alegre, and Jesús Lobo by over 20 points.

== Achievements ==
=== Four Hills Tournament ===
1978–79 Four Hills Tournament
Oberstdorf	Garmisch-Partenkirchen	Innsbruck	Bischofshofen	Overall
77	77	74	72	72
1979–80 Four Hills Tournament
Oberstdorf	Garmisch-Partenkirchen	Innsbruck	Bischofshofen	Overall
94	98	105	104	101
1982–83 Four Hills Tournament
Oberstdorf	Garmisch-Partenkirchen	Innsbruck	Bischofshofen	Overall
77	78	88	82	78

=== King's Cup ===
==== Individual ====
1979 (Spain) La Molina	–	19th place – 55 m (76.5 points)
1980 (Spain) La Molina	–	6th place – 192.4 points
1981 (Spain) La Molina	–	2nd place – 69.5 m, 67 m (217.2 points)
1982 (Spain) La Molina	–	11th place – 67.5 m, 68.5 m (212.3 points)
1983 (Spain) La Molina	–	11th place – 68 m, 67.5 m (210.9 points)
1987 (Spain) La Molina	–	18th place – 57 m, 53 m (122.5 points)
1991 (Spain) La Molina	–	33rd place – 58.5 m, 60 m (142.3 points)
1992 (Spain) La Molina	–	15th place – 60.5 m, 60 m (145.9 points)
