= Filip Mihaljević (footballer, born 2000) =

Croatian footballer

Personal information
- Date of birth: 14 November 2000 (age 25)
- Place of birth: Sisak, Croatia
- Height: 1.85 m (6 ft 1 in)
- Position: Midfielder

Team information
- Current team: Jarun
- Number: 19

Senior career*
Years	Team	Apps	(Gls)
2018–2020	Dinamo Zagreb	0	(0)
2018–2019	→ Dinamo Zagreb II	1	(0)
2019	→ Hrv. Dragovoljac (loan)	10	(0)
2020–2021	Lokomotiv Plovdiv	3	(0)
2021	Međimurje	13	(1)
2021–2022	Sesvete	25	(1)
2022–	Jarun	11	(1)
- * Club domestic league appearances and goals as of 19 June 2023

Filip Mihaljević (born 14 November 2000) is a Croatian professional footballer who plays as a midfielder for Jarun Zagreb in the Croatian Second Football League.

== Career ==
Mihaljević began his career with Dinamo Zagreb but was unable to break into the first team and spent time on loan with Hrvatski Dragovoljac, before joining Lokomotiv Plovdiv permanently after his release by Dinamo Zagreb in September 2020.
