= Boy van Baarle =

Dutch former ski jumper and ski jumping coach

Personal information
- Born: December 18, 1983 (age 42) Delft

Sport
- Sport: Skiing

Achievements and titles
- Personal best: 197.0 m in Tauplitz

Boy van Baarle (born 18 December 1983 in Delft) is a Dutch former ski jumper and ski jumping coach. He was a representative of the Netherlands in ski jumping and holds the national record for the longest men's ski jump. His greatest international achievement was finishing 5th in a FIS Ski Jumping Continental Cup in Ishpeming during the 2000/2001 season. He also won a bronze medal at the Dutch National Championships in 2001.

== Biography ==
=== Sports career (1994–2005) ===
Boy van Baarle made his first ski jump in 1994. Initially, he also practiced alpine skiing. He began his professional sports career at the encouragement of one of the Dutch coaches after attending a so-called "talent day" organized annually by the Dutch Ski Association. Along with him, a group of 10 athletes was selected, including one woman, Nathalie Rissema. Boy van Baarle was considered one of the most talented in this group and, encouraged by Jarno Bora (a former jumper and Dutch championship medalist), he soon began jumping on a ski hill with a construction point of 65 meters.

He debuted in international competitions under the auspices of the International Ski and Snowboard Federation in March 2000, finishing in last place (54th) in a FIS Ski Jumping Continental Cup event in Rovaniemi. He debuted in summer competitions on 15 July 2000 in Villach, where he finished 51st in a Continental Cup event. His first points in the Continental Cup were earned on 11 February 2001 in Westby, USA, where after jumps of 100 and 92.5 meters, he placed 27th. He scored more points in competitions held on 17 and 18 February 2001 in Iron Mountain – 11th place on the first day and 29th on the second. He scored his highest-ever career placement of 5th on 24 February 2001 in Ishpeming, after jumps of 85.5 and 87.5 meters. Over the course of the 2000/2001 season, he earned 75 points and was ranked 109th in the overall Continental Cup standings. This season was also his best career performance.

In March 2001, van Baarle was registered for the qualification round of the World Cup individual competition in Oslo but ultimately did not compete. During the Continental Cup competition in Iron Mountain, Boy van Baarle set a new Dutch men's ski jump record of 123 meters, breaking the previous record of 118.5 meters held by Niels de Groot. In March 2001, at the Dutch Ski Jumping Championships in Ramsau am Dachstein, he won a bronze medal in the individual competition on the K-90 hill, finishing behind Ingemar Mayr (1st place) and Niels de Groot (2nd place).

On 5 September 2001, Boy van Baarle made his debut in the main competition of the FIS Ski Jumping Grand Prix. He did not earn any points in the three main competitions of the 2001 season, with his best result being 40th place twice. In December 2001, he participated for the first time in a World Cup competition in Villach but did not qualify for the main event. In the team event, his team finished in last place, 10th. In the 2001/2002 season, he competed in the World Cup again on 27 January 2002 in Sapporo, where his team finished 11th in the team event. He participated in qualifiers for main events three more times, but never qualified. Despite several starts, he did not score any points in the Continental Cup that season. However, he earned 3 points in the Summer Continental Cup with a 28th-place finish on 1 September 2001 in Park City. Since summer competitions were not then treated as a separate cycle, he was ranked 263rd in the overall Continental Cup standings.

In the 2002/2003 season, Boy van Baarle primarily competed in the Continental Cup. Following the introduction of the summer Continental Cup as a separate cycle, he earned points in the inaugural edition. This occurred on 21 and 22 September 2002 in Calgary, where he placed 22nd and 25th, respectively, earning a total of 15 points. During the winter Continental Cup, he scored points three times, all in Ishpeming. On 28 February 2003, he placed 22nd, followed by 19th on 1 March and 12th on 2 March. In total, across 15 events in the season, he accumulated 43 points, ranking 116th in the overall standings.

In the following season, van Baarle again focused on Continental Cup competitions. He participated in eight summer Continental Cup events, scoring points only once, with a 29th place on 20 July 2003 in Calgary. This earned him two points and a 97th-place ranking in the overall summer standings. On 30 November 2003, in Rukatunturi, he debuted in an individual World Cup event, finishing 69th out of 73 competitors. This was his first and only participation in an individual World Cup main competition. In the same season, he took part in 18 Continental Cup events, earning points only once with a 29th-place finish on 9 January 2004 in Sapporo. This result placed him 136th in the overall standings with two points. Throughout the season, he also participated in six World Cup qualification rounds but never advanced to the main competition.

The 2004/2005 season marked the end of his professional ski jumping career. He competed in five summer Continental Cup events without earning points, with his best result being 49th place on 10 July 2004 in Velenje. In the winter cycle, he participated in 21 events, again without scoring points, with a best result of 32nd place on 26 February 2005 in Iron Mountain. His final international competition was the Continental Cup in Zakopane on 12 March 2005, where he placed 61st.

In spring 2005, after the 2004/2005 season, van Baarle retired from professional ski jumping. At the time, he was the only Dutch athlete still actively competing in the sport and the last of the jumpers who had started their careers in the 1990s as part of the Dutch national team development plan. His decision to retire was influenced by a lack of financial support from the Dutch Ski Association.

=== After the end of ski jumping career (from 2005) ===
Following his retirement from professional ski jumping, Boy van Baarle transitioned into coaching, training children and youth at the Austrian sports club WSC Bad Mitterndorf. He was also responsible for the development of young athletes within the Styrian ski association.

Besides ski jumping, van Baarle participates in other sports. Since August 2004, he has played in lower Austrian football leagues as a midfielder. He played for ASV Bad Mitterndorf from 2004 to 2009, then represented FC Tauplitz from 2009 to 2011, and has been playing for ASV Ebner-Transporte Bad Mitterndorf since June 2011. Additionally, he practices alpine skiing and in March 2011, competed in the Lopernalm Trophy, where he finished second in his class and 19th in the overall standings.

== Private life ==
Boy van Baarle is the son of John van Baarle and Jolanda van Beynum. He has one brother, Kaya, born in 1987. Boy's nickname is BVB. He holds both Dutch and Austrian citizenship. During his athletic career, he lived in Delft, the Netherlands, where he was born, as well as in the Austrian resort town of Bad Mitterndorf, where he currently resides after retiring from professional sports. He speaks English, Dutch, and German. In May 2012, he married Petra Präsoll, who adopted the surname van Baarle. The couple has one son.

== World Cup ==
=== Placements in individual World Cup competitions ===
Season 2001/2002
Kuopio	Kuopio	Titisee-Neustadt	Titisee-Neustadt	Villach	Engelberg	Engelberg	Predazzo	Predazzo	Oberstdorf	Garmisch-Partenkirchen	Innsbruck	Bischofshofen	Willingen	Zakopane	Zakopane	Hakuba	Sapporo	Lahti	Falun	Trondheim	Oslo	points						
-	-	-	-	q	-	-	-	-	-	-	-	-	q	-	-	q	q	-	-	-	-	0						
Season 2003/2004
Ruka	Ruka	Trondheim	Titisee-Neustadt	Engelberg	Oberstdorf	Garmisch-Partenkirchen	Innsbruck	Bischofshofen	Liberec	Liberec	Zakopane	Zakopane	Hakuba	Sapporo	Sapporo	Oberstdorf	Willingen	Park City	Lahti	Kuopio	Lillehammer	Oslo	points					
q	69	-	-	-	-	-	-	-	-	-	-	-	-	-	-	q	q	q	-	-	q	q	0					
Season 2004/2005
Ruka	Ruka	Trondheim	Trondheim	Harrachov	Harrachov	Engelberg	Engelberg	Oberstdorf	Garmisch-Partenkirchen	Innsbruck	Bischofshofen	Willingen	Bad Mitterndorf	Bad Mitterndorf	Titisee-Neustadt	Titisee-Neustadt	Zakopane	Zakopane	Sapporo	Sapporo	Pragelato	Lahti	Kuopio	Lillehammer	Oslo	Planica	Planica	points
-	-	-	-	-	-	-	-	-	-	q	q	-	-	-	-	-	-	-	-	-	-	-	-	-	-	-	-	0
Legend
1 2 3 4-10 11-30 below 30 dq – disqualification q – disqualification in qualifications q – did not qualify - – did not compete

== Summer Grand Prix ==
=== Placements in individual Summer Grand Prix competitions ===
2001
Hinterzarten	Hinterzarten	Courchevel	Stams	Sapporo	Hakuba	Hakuba	points
q	q	q	-	48	40	40	0
2004
Hinterzarten	Courchevel	Zakopane	Predazzo	Innsbruck	Hakuba	Hakuba	points
q	-	-	-	q	q	q	0
Legend
1 2 3 4-10 11-30 below 30 q – disqualification in qualifications q – did not qualify: – did not compete

== Continental Cup ==
=== Overall standings in the Continental Cup ===
Season	Place	Source
2000/2001	109th	
2001/2002	263rd	
2002/2003	115th	
2003/2004	136th	

=== Places in the individual competitions of the Continental Cup ===
Season 1998/1999
Velenje	Velenje	Berchtesgaden	Villach	Oberstdorf	Oberstdorf	Zakopane	Zakopane	Rælingen	Kuopio	Lahti	Lahti	Sankt Moritz	Engelberg	Bad Goisern	Bad Goisern	Sapporo	Sapporo	Sapporo	Lauscha	Lauscha	Gallio	Gallio	Reit im Winkl	Saalfelden	Ruhpolding	Braunlage	Braunlage	Westby	Westby	Planica	Planica	Titisee-Neustadt	Iron Mountain	Schönwald	Ishpeming	Ishpeming	Ishpeming	Sapporo	Zaō	Zaō	Courchevel	Courchevel	Vikersund	Vikersund	Hede	Hede	Kuopio	Rovaniemi	Ruka	Ruka	points
-	-	-	-	-	-	-	-	-	-	-	-	-	-	q	q	-	-	-	-	-	-	-	-	-	-	42	42	-	-	-	-	51	-	54	-	-	-	-	-	-	-	-	-	-	-	-	-	-	-	-	0
Season 1999/2000
Velenje	Velenje	Villach	Villach	Oberstdorf	Zakopane	Zakopane	Rælingen	Hakuba	Hakuba	Trondheim	Trondheim	Kuopio	Lahti	Lahti	Innsbruck	Engelberg	Gallio	Gallio	Sapporo	Sapporo	Sapporo	Brotterode	Lauscha	Braunlage	Braunlage	Hakuba	Hakuba	Courchevel	Courchevel	Berchtesgaden	Saalfelden	Mislinja	Westby	Westby	Planica	Planica	Ishpeming	Ishpeming	Schönwald	Titisee-Neustadt	Eisenerz	Eisenerz	Zaō	Zaō	Våler	Våler	Harrachov	Harrachov	Rovaniemi	Ruka	points
-	-	-	-	q	q	q	-	-	-	-	-	-	-	-	53	-	-	-	-	-	-	q	q	-	-	-	-	-	-	-	-	-	-	-	-	-	-	-	-	-	-	-	-	-	-	-	-	-	54	-	0
Season 2000/2001
Velenje	Velenje	Villach	Oberstdorf	Rælingen	Rælingen	Winterberg	Sankt Moritz	Innsbruck	Bischofshofen	Sapporo	Sapporo	Sapporo	Brotterode	Brotterode	Lauscha	Lauscha	Ramsau	Schönwald	Westby	Westby	Titisee-Neustadt	Planica	Iron Mountain	Iron Mountain	Ishpeming	Chamonix	Chamonix	Zakopane	Zakopane	Vikersund	Vikersund	Harrachov	Harrachov	Våler	Zaō	Zaō	Örnsköldsvik	Örnsköldsvik	Hede	points											
q	q	51	-	48	-	q	q	-	q	-	-	-	-	-	35	q	-	-	31	27	-	-	11	29	5	-	-	-	-	46	q	-	-	-	-	-	-	-	-	75											
Season 2001/2002
Velenje	Velenje	Villach	Villach	Oberstdorf	Rælingen	Rælingen	Calgary	Calgary	Park City	Park City	Oberhof	Ruka	Ruka	Lahti	Lahti	Sankt Moritz	Engelberg	Innsbruck	Sapporo	Sapporo	Sapporo	Bischofshofen	Bischofshofen	Ishpeming	Ishpeming	Courchevel	Courchevel	Lauscha	Westby	Westby	Braunlage	Braunlage	Gallio	Gallio	Planica	Iron Mountain	Iron Mountain	Schönwald	Schönwald	Zaō	Zaō	Vikersund	Vikersund	Vikersund	points						
-	-	50	48	48	-	-	-	-	28	-	-	-	-	-	-	q	40	-	-	-	-	-	-	-	-	41	38	-	-	-	-	-	-	-	-	-	-	-	-	-	-	-	-	-	3						
Season 2002/2003
Lahti	Lahti	Liberec	Liberec	Sankt Moritz	Engelberg	Seefeld	Bischofshofen	Sapporo	Sapporo	Sapporo	Planica	Planica	Titisee-Neustadt	Titisee-Neustadt	Braunlage	Braunlage	Willingen	Zakopane	Zakopane	Eisenerz	Eisenerz	Westby	Brotterode	Brotterode	Lauscha	Ishpeming	Ishpeming	Ishpeming	Ruhpolding	Ruhpolding	Zaō	Zaō	Stryn	Stryn	points																
67	53	52	63	39	40	75	98	-	-	-	-	-	76	75	-	-	78	-	-	-	-	55	-	-	-	22	19	12	-	-	-	-	-	-	43																
Season 2003/2004
Lillehammer	Lillehammer	Sankt Moritz	Engelberg	Seefeld	Planica	Planica	Sapporo	Sapporo	Sapporo	Bischofshofen	Bischofshofen	Braunlage	Braunlage	Brotterode	Brotterode	Zakopane	Westby	Westby	Iron Mountain	Iron Mountain	Kuopio	Kuopio	Vikersund	Vikersund	points																										
-	-	63	68	73	74	52	29	32	38	54	49	48	58	43	48	-	-	-	53	50	-	-	48	47	2																										
Season 2004/2005
Rovaniemi	Rovaniemi	Lahti	Lahti	Harrachov	Harrachov	Sankt Moritz	Engelberg	Engelberg	Seefeld	Planica	Planica	Sapporo	Sapporo	Sapporo	Bischofshofen	Bischofshofen	Lauscha	Lauscha	Braunlage	Braunlage	Brotterode	Brotterode	Westby	Westby	Iron Mountain	Iron Mountain	Vikersund	Vikersund	Zakopane	points																					
78	68	57	72	55	61	60	69	60	81	66	71	-	-	-	71	60	-	-	-	-	-	-	40	41	32	36	51	55	61	0																					
Legend
1 2 3 4-10 11-30 below 30 dq – disqualification q – did not qualify: – did not compete

== Summer Continental Cup ==
=== Places in the Summer Continental Cup overall ranking ===
Season	Place	Source
2002	75th	
2003	97th	

=== Places in the individual competitions of the Summer Continental Cup ===
2002
Velenje	Velenje	Oberstdorf	Rælingen	Rælingen	Falun	Calgary	Calgary	Park City	Park City	points
68	75	101	56	66	44	22	25	33	44	15
2003
Velenje	Velenje	Calgary	Calgary	Park City	Park City	Garmisch-Partenkirchen	Garmisch-Partenkirchen	Trondheim	Trondheim	points
dq	dq	33	29	31	35	75	66	33	35	2
2004
Velenje	Velenje	Oberstdorf	Oberstdorf	Ramsau	Ramsau	Lillehammer	Lillehammer	points		
dq	49	76	69	71	80	-	-	0		
Legend
1 2 3 4-10 11-30 below 30 dq – disqualification: − did not compete
