= Croatia national ski jumping team =

Since creation in 2007

- Sport: Ski jumping
- Founded: 2007
- Team history: First Croatian ski jumping championships held in 1942; team re-established in 2007
- Head coach: Anton Zamernik

The Croatia national ski jumping team was established in 2007. As of 2011, the team consisted of a single athlete, Urban Zamernik, with his father, Anton Zamernik, serving as both the head coach and equipment technician.

The team operates under the direct oversight of the classical skiing committee of the Croatian Ski Association (Croatian: Hrvatski skijaški savez). The primary sponsor is the Croatian branch of the OMV company.

The national record holder is Josip Šporer, who achieved a jump of 102 metres in Planica during the 1940s.

== Sponsors ==
The primary sponsor, the Croatian branch of OMV, also supports the national ski jumping teams of Austria, Czech Republic, Romania, and Slovenia. A sponsorship agreement was signed with the Croatian Ski Association on 9 September 2010, providing financial support for Urban Zamernik to improve his athletic performance, promote ski jumping in Croatia, and encourage young athletes to take up the sport.

== Background ==
=== Sports facilities ===
Croatia has had five ski jumping hills, constructed between 1934 and 1948. The oldest, built in 1934 in Mrkopalj, was a small ski jumping hill with a construction point at 40 metres, now in ruins. Other ski jumping hills, also now destroyed, were located in Zagreb (Sljeme K–35 and K–12 hills), Prezid (K–40 hill), and Skrad (K–30 hill, with preparations for ski jumping resuming in 2007). Additionally, between 1935 and 1948, the Japlensky Vrh ski jumping complex in Delnice, designed by Slovenian architect Stanko Bloudek, was built, featuring hills with construction points at K–25, K–30, and K–70. Bloudek also designed the Bloudkova velikanka hill. In 2006, the largest hill was renovated for ski jumping. In 2007, a project to build a winter sports centre in Delnice, including a large ski jumping hill and three smaller hills, was proposed, supported by the Croatian Olympic Committee, the Croatian Ski Association, and the International Ski and Snowboard Federation.

=== History ===
Croatian ski jumpers began competing internationally in the 1930s. By the end of World War II, several dozen had participated in competitions. In 1942, the first Croatian ski jumping championships were held at the Sljeme hill in Zagreb, with Franjo Dvorzak winning after jumps of 28 and 29 metres, ahead of Boris Merkl. During the 1970s, Croatian ski jumpers competed under the Yugoslavian team. The last official ski jumping competition in Croatia took place in 1980 at the Delnice hill, with the final jump recorded there in 1981 in the 20th century.

On 1 March 2006, after a 25-year hiatus, the Delnice hill hosted a junior friendly competition for the Delnice Cup, featuring 15 Slovenian jumpers aged 13 to 16. The event, won by Jaka Tesovnik with Urban Zamernik taking second place, was watched by approximately 2,000 spectators. Zamernik announced his intention to represent Croatia in the future. The competition aimed to spark interest in ski jumping among Croatians and recruit young athletes to train in Slovenia for future representation of Croatia.

In the summer of 2007, the SK Goranin club established a ski jumping and Nordic combined section. Two smaller ski jumping hills in Delnice were renovated for training, with plans to restore the K–30 hill and cover all three with plastic matting, though the city of Delnice did not provide the necessary 100,000 kuna. By 2008, the ski jumping section had 10 boys aged 8 to 13, which dropped to five by November 2009. Construction of three new ski jumping hills began to revive the sport in Croatia, with plans to install plastic matting on smaller hills by summer 2010. Due to limited infrastructure, Croatian jumpers train in Delnice only in winter and travel to Slovenia during other seasons.

== Results ==
=== 2007/2008 season ===
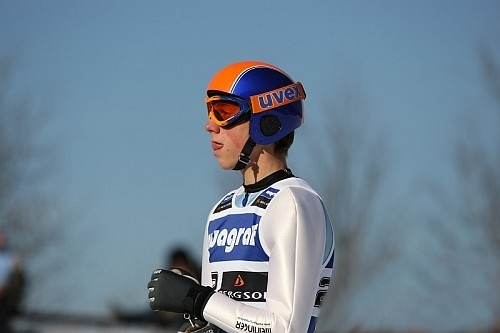
Urban Zamernik during training for the Junior World Championships in Zakopane in 2008

Urban Zamernik, who competed as a Slovenian in junior events until 2006, received Croatian citizenship in late 2007. Due to procedural requirements, he could not compete internationally until January 2008. The Croatian Ski Association formed the national ski jumping team with Zamernik as its sole member.

Zamernik debuted internationally on 17 February 2008, at the FIS Cup in Szczyrk, placing 33rd. In the second competition that day, he finished 24th, earning his first career points. These points placed him 259th in the individual FIS Cup standings for the 2007/2008 season, with Croatia ranking 22nd in the unofficial team standings. These were his only two starts in cup competitions that season.

Zamernik was entered in the Junior World Championships in Zakopane in February 2008. In official training sessions on 26 February 2008, he placed 75th (64 metres) and 61st (68 metres). He was disqualified in the individual competition the following day.

=== 2008/2009 season ===
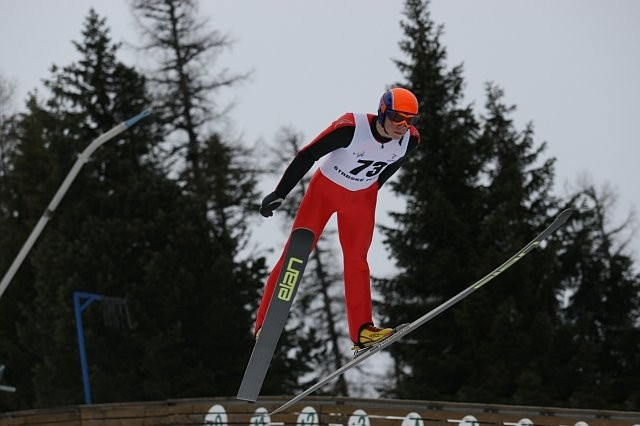
Urban Zamernik during the Junior World Championships in Štrbské Pleso in 2009

In the 2008/2009 season, Urban Zamernik did not compete in any cup events. His only international competitions sanctioned by the International Ski and Snowboard Federation were the Junior World Championships in Štrbské Pleso. In training sessions on 3 February 2009, he placed 85th (67 metres) and 80th (72.5 metres). On 4 February, he placed 75th (74.5 metres) and 91st (65.5 metres) in further training. On 5 February 2009, Zamernik competed in his second Junior World Championships, jumping 69 metres for a total of 60.5 points, finishing 74th.

On 1 March 2009, the International Olympic Committee, at the request of the Croatian Olympic Committee, awarded Urban Zamernik a one-year Olympic scholarship, valid until the end of February 2010.

=== 2009/2010 season ===
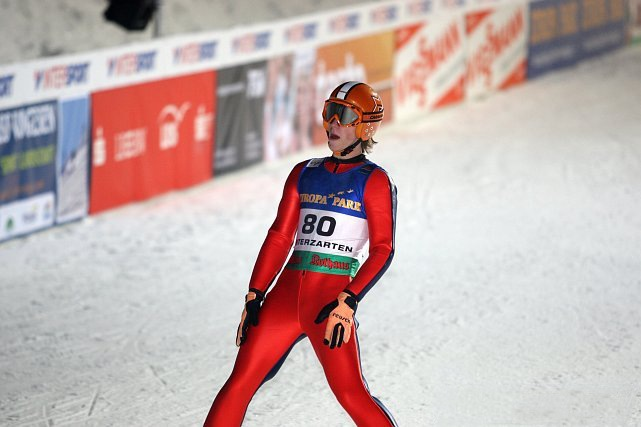
Urban Zamernik during training for the Junior World Championships in Hinterzarten in 2010

In July 2009, Urban Zamernik was entered for his first summer cup competition sanctioned by the International Ski and Snowboard Federation but did not compete in the FIS Cup event in Villach on 10 July 2009.

On 16 and 17 January 2010, he competed in the FIS Cup in Szczyrk, placing 39th and 44th, respectively.

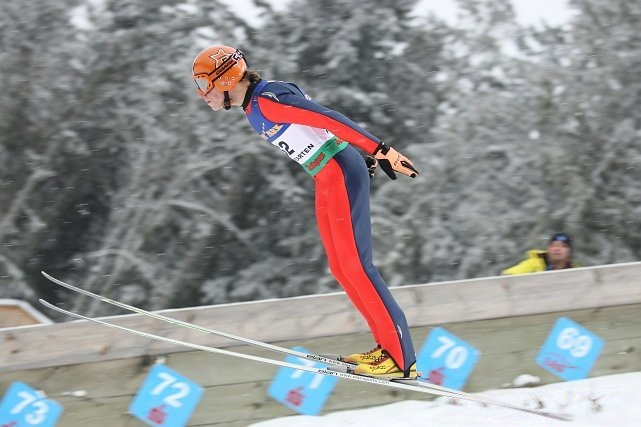
Urban Zamernik during the Junior World Championships in Hinterzarten in 2010

In late January 2010, Zamernik was entered for his third Junior World Championships. In training sessions on 27 January, he placed 71st (77.5 metres) and 62nd (85.5 metres). In the competition on 28 January in Hinterzarten, he jumped 82 metres, finishing 59th.

Unlike previous years, this was not his final competition of the season. On 13 February, he placed 43rd in the FIS Cup in Villach. On 21 February, he competed in two FIS Cup events in Kranj, placing 44th and 48th. These were his final competitions of the 2009/2010 season.

=== 2010/2011 season ===
In the 2010/2011 season, Urban Zamernik debuted in summer cup competitions sanctioned by the International Ski and Snowboard Federation. On 17 July 2010, in the FIS Cup in Villach, he placed 25th, earning his second career points in the FIS Cup. The next day, he finished 31st. These were his final summer competitions of the season.

In late January 2011, Zamernik was entered for his fourth and final Junior World Championships. In training sessions on 27 January, he placed 60th (76 metres) and 69th (73.5 metres). In the trial round before the competition, he was 46th (79 metres). In the competition on 28 January 2011 in Otepää, he jumped 71 metres, finishing 61st.

In the FIS Cup in Villach on 19 February 2011, Zamernik placed 60th. The next day, he finished 58th. These were his final competitions of the 2010/2011 season. His points from the first Villach FIS Cup event placed him 236th in the individual standings, with Croatia ranking 25th in the unofficial team standings.

== Statistics ==
=== Junior World Championships ===
- Individual
  - Urban Zamernik:
    - 2008 Zakopane – disqualified
    - 2009 Štrbské Pleso – 74th place
    - 2010 Hinterzarten – 59th place
    - 2011 Otepää – 61st place

=== FIS Cup ===
==== Overall standings ====
- Team
  - 2007/08 season – 22nd place
  - 2010/11 season – 25th place
- Individual
  - Urban Zamernik:
    - 2007/08 season – 259th place
    - 2010/11 season – 236th place
