= Urban Zamernik =

Croatian ski jumper of Slovenian origin

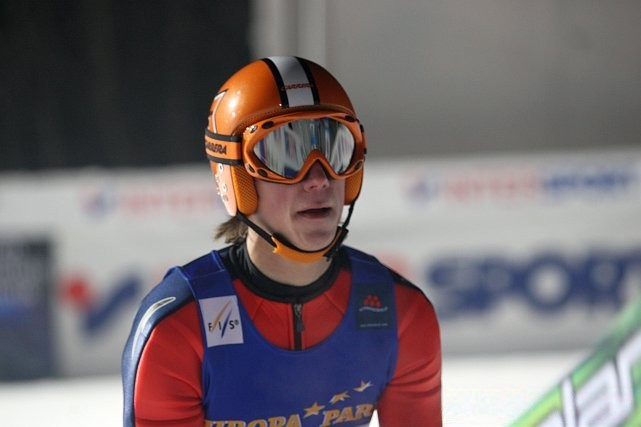

Personal information
- Born: March 8, 1991 (age 35) Ljubno ob Savinji, Slovenia

Sport
- Country: Croatia, Slovenia
- Sport: Skiing
- Club: SSK Ljubno BTC (until 2006); SK Goranin (since 2006)

Urban Zamernik (born 8 March 1991 in Ljubno ob Savinji) is a Croatian ski jumper of Slovenian origin. He competes for the SK Goranin club and is currently the only representative of Croatia in ski jumping. His father, Anton Zamernik, serves as the head coach and equipment manager for the Croatian national team and is also Urban's personal coach.

Zamernik is a former record holder of the Japlensky Vrh ski jumping hill in Delnice, where he jumped 66 metres on 1 March 2006.

He has competed in 11 FIS Cup events, with his best result being 24th place in a competition held on 17 February 2008 at the Skalite hill in Szczyrk. He has also participated four times in the Junior World Ski Championships, achieving his best result on 28 January 2010 in Hinterzarten, where he finished 59th.

== Career ==
=== Early career (until 2007) ===
Zamernik was born in Slovenia and began his ski jumping career there, initially representing the SSK Ljubno BTC club. Until 2006, he competed as a Slovenian in junior events.

He frequently participated in junior competitions, primarily at the national level. In the summer of 2004, he finished fifth in the Slovenian Cup in the under-13 category. On 18 June 2005, he competed in the Perfect Milk Cup in Zakopane, jumping 55.5 and 61.5 metres to secure eighth place in the younger junior category, making him the top non-Polish competitor. In March 2005, he competed in the OPA Games in Oberwiesenthal, finishing 18th individually in the competition for athletes born in 1990 or later and fifth in the team event.

On 1 March 2006, Zamernik participated in a friendly junior competition for the Delnice Cup, where 15 Slovenian jumpers aged 13 to 16 competed. The event, featuring jumpers from Ljubno ob Savinji and Brežice, was won by Jaka Tesovnik, with Zamernik taking second place and setting the venue record. After the event, Zamernik announced his intention to represent Croatia in the near future. At the time, he was among Slovenia's top five jumpers in his age category. Three days later, still competing as a Slovenian, he participated in an OPA competition in Planica, finishing 21st individually and 11th in the team event.

=== 2007/2008 season ===
In late 2007, Zamernik obtained Croatian citizenship. Due to procedural reasons, he could not compete internationally until January 2008. To support him, the Croatian Ski Association established a national ski jumping team, with Zamernik as its sole member. In November 2007, alongside his then-coach Tomaž Murko and his father, he participated in a 10-day training camp in Zakopane.

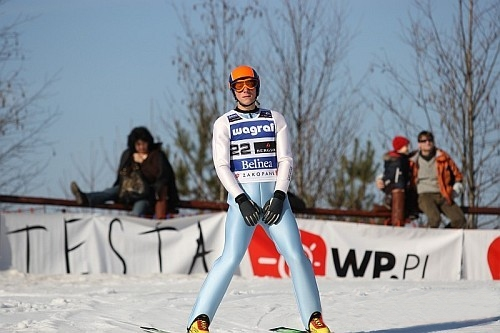
Urban Zamernik during training ahead of the individual Junior World Championship competition in Zakopane in 2008

Zamernik made his international debut on 17 February 2008 in the FIS Cup in Szczyrk, marking his first competition as a Croatian representative. In the first round of the competition, he jumped 84 metres, placing 33rd, tied with Belarusian Vasily Tomilov. In the second competition held that day, he jumped 84.5 metres, finishing 24th and earning his first career points. These points placed him 259th in the 2007/2008 FIS Cup overall standings. These were his only two FIS Cup appearances that season.

In February 2008, Zamernik was entered into the Junior World Championships in Zakopane. During official training sessions on 26 February 2008, he placed 75th (64 metres) and 61st (68 metres). The following day, he was disqualified in the individual competition.

=== 2008/2009 season ===
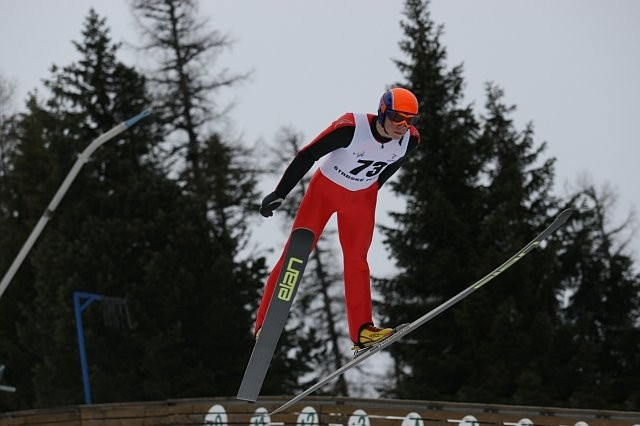
Urban Zamernik during the individual Junior World Championship competition in Štrbské Pleso in 2009

In the 2008/2009 season, Zamernik did not compete in any FIS Cup events. His only international competition sanctioned by the International Ski Federation was the Junior World Championships in Štrbské Pleso. In training sessions on 3 February 2009, he placed 85th (67 metres) and 80th (72.5 metres). The next day, he placed 75th (74.5 metres) and 91st (65.5 metres) in further training rounds. On 5 February 2009, Zamernik competed in his second Junior World Championships, jumping 69 metres for a total of 60.5 points, finishing 74th.

On 1 March 2009, the International Olympic Committee, at the request of the Croatian Olympic Committee, awarded annual Olympic scholarships to ten Croatian athletes, including Zamernik, competing in disciplines included in the 2010 Winter Olympics. The scholarship, lasting from 1 March 2009 to 28 February 2010, amounted to 1,500 US dollars monthly.

=== 2009/2010 season ===
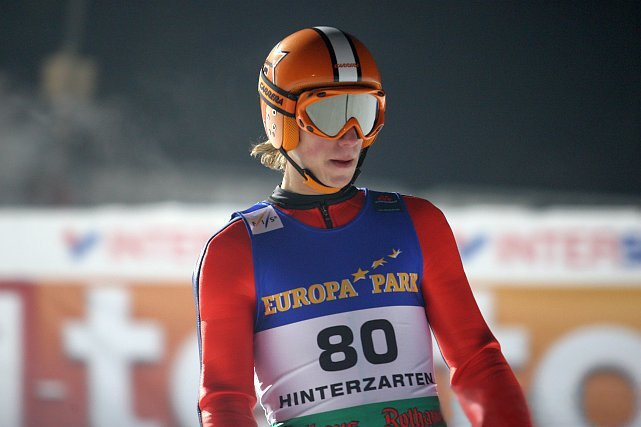
Urban Zamernik during training before the individual Junior World Championship competition in Hinterzarten in 2010

In July 2009, Zamernik was registered for his first summer FIS Cup event in Villach on 10 July but ultimately did not compete.

On 16 and 17 January 2010, he competed in the FIS Cup in Szczyrk, his first international appearance since the Štrbské Pleso Junior World Championships. In the first competition, he jumped 89 metres, finishing 39th, tied with Czech Hubert Bláha. The next day, he jumped 86.5 metres, placing 44th.

In late January 2010, Zamernik was entered for his third Junior World Championships. During training on 27 January 2010, he placed 71st (77.5 metres) and 62nd (85.5 metres). In the competition on 28 January in Hinterzarten, he jumped 82 metres, finishing 59th with 81.5 points.

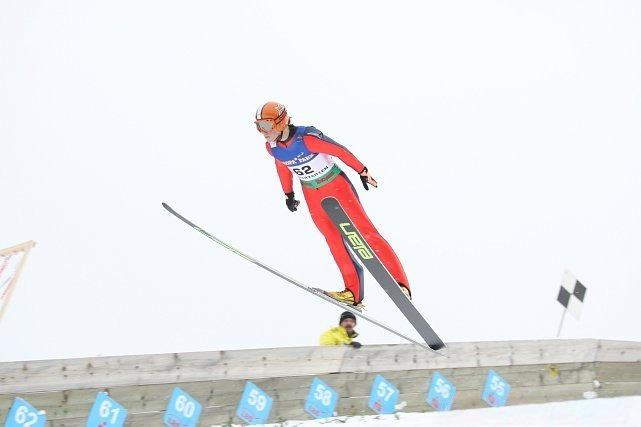
Urban Zamernik during the individual Junior World Championship competition in Hinterzarten in 2010

Unlike previous years, the Junior World Championships were not his final event of the season. On 13 February, he jumped 77.5 metres in the FIS Cup in Villach, finishing 43rd. Eight days later, in Kranj, he jumped 88 metres in the first of two FIS Cup events on 21 February, finishing 44th, tied with German Jens Kratzel. In the second event, he jumped 83.5 metres, placing 48th. This marked his final competition of the 2009/2010 season.

After the season, in July 2010, Zamernik was named the best ski jumper in the Primorje-Gorski Kotar County.

=== 2010/2011 season ===
On 9 September 2010, OMV became a sponsor of the Croatian ski jumping team and Zamernik himself.

In the 2010/2011 season, Zamernik debuted in summer FIS Cup events. On 17 July 2010, in Villach, he jumped 84.5 and 82 metres, finishing 25th and earning his second career FIS Cup points. The next day, he jumped 79 metres, finishing 31st, tied with Slovenian Jaka Debelak. These were his final summer competitions of the season. He was also initially entered for the concluding events of the 2010 Continental Cup in Wisła, but did not compete.

In late January 2011, Zamernik competed in his fourth and final Junior World Championships, registered for the individual event. During training on 27 January, he placed 60th (76 metres) and 69th (73.5 metres). In the trial round before the competition, he placed 46th (79 metres). In the competition on 28 January 2011 in Otepää, he jumped 71 metres, finishing 61st with 69.5 points.

As in the previous year, this was not his final event of the season. On 19 February 2011, in the FIS Cup in Villach, he jumped 65 metres, finishing 60th, tied with Romanian Iulian Pitea. The next day, he jumped 71.5 metres, placing 58th. This was his final competition of the 2010/2011 season. The points he earned in the first Villach FIS Cup event placed him 236th in the 2010/2011 FIS Cup standings.

After the season, as in the previous year, Zamernik was named the best ski jumper in Primorje-Gorski Kotar County.

== FIS Cup ==
=== Overall standings ===
Season	Place
2007/2008	259
2010/2011	236

== Personal life ==
Urban Zamernik holds both Slovenian and Croatian citizenship. He is fluentboth in Croatian and Slovene. He resides in Delnice and competes for the local SK Goranin club.
