= Virág Vörös =

Hungarian ski jumper

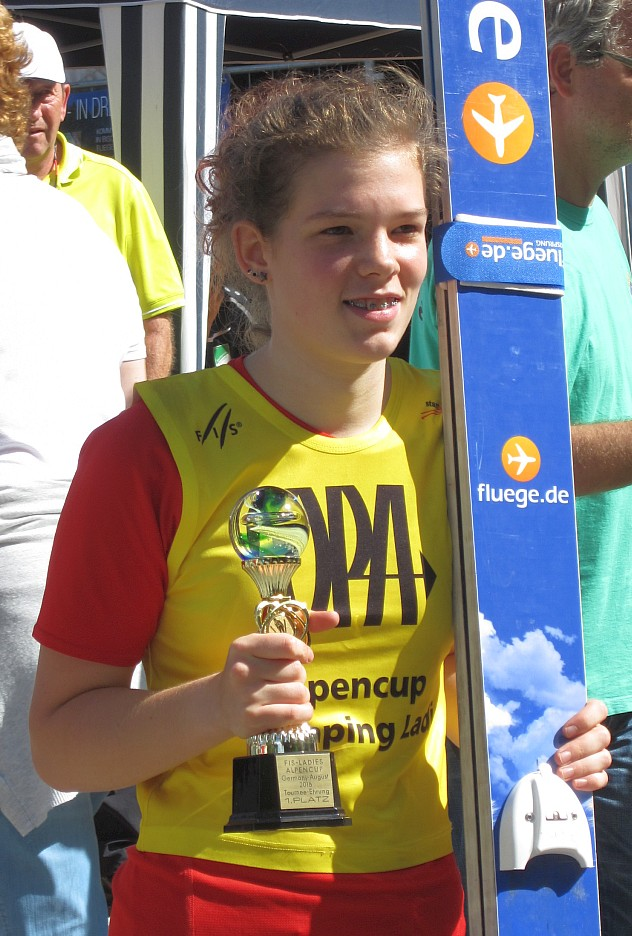

Personal information
- Nationality: Hungary
- Born: 12 July 1999 (age 27) Szombathely, Hungary

Sport
- Sport: Skiing
- Club: Kőszegi SE

World Cup career
- Seasons: 2018–2021
- Indiv. starts: 11
- Updated on 28 March 2021

Virág Vörös (born 12 July 1999) is a Hungarian ski jumper. She is the first ski jumper representing Hungary in the World Cup, since Gábor Gellér's last start in Garmisch-Partenkirchen '89.

== Career ==
=== 2015: World Championships ===
On 20 February 2015, she performed at FIS Nordic World Ski Championships 2015 ladies' normal hill individual event in Falun and stuck in qualification round.

=== 2017: World Cup debut ===
On 30 November 2017, she made he World Cup debut at the 2017/18 season opening in Lillehammer, where she stuck at 57th place in qualification round.

== World Cup results ==
=== Standings ===
Season	Overall	TL3	RA	BB
2017/18	—	—	N/A	N/A
2018/19	—	—	—	—
2019/20	42	N/A	37	N/A
2020/21	—	N/A	—	—

=== Individual starts (11) ===
Season	1	2	3	4	5	6	7	8	9	10	11	12	13	14	15	16	17	18	19	20	21	22	23	24	Points
2017/18	Lillehammer	Lillehammer	Lillehammer	Hinterzarten	Sapporo	Sapporo	Zaō Onsen	Zaō Onsen	Ljubno	Ljubno	Râșnov	Râșnov	Oslo	Oberstdorf	Oberstdorf										0
2017/18	q	q	–	–	–	–	–	–	q	q	q	q	–	–	–										0
2018/19	Lillehammer	Lillehammer	Lillehammer	Prémanon	Prémanon	Sapporo	Sapporo	Zaō Onsen	Zaō Onsen	Râșnov	Râșnov	Hinzenbach	Hinzenbach	Ljubno	Ljubno	Oberstdorf	Oberstdorf	Oslo	Lillehammer	Trondheim	Nizhny Tagil	Nizhny Tagil	Chaykovsky, Perm Krai	Chaykovsky, Perm Krai	0
2018/19	q	q	q	q	–	–	–	–	–	–	–	q	q	q	54	–	–	–	–	–	–	–	–	–	0
2019/20	Lillehammer	Lillehammer	Klingenthal	Sapporo	Sapporo	Zaō Onsen	Zaō Onsen	Râșnov	Râșnov	Oberstdorf	Oberstdorf	Hinzenbach	Hinzenbach	Ljubno ob Savinji	Oslo	Lillehammer									12
2019/20	q	q	38	q	q	q	38	30	34	29	32	29	30	25	–	–									12
2020/21	Ramsau am Dachstein	Ljubno ob Savinji	Titisee-Neustadt	Titisee-Neustadt	Hinzenbach	Hinzenbach	Hinzenbach	Râșnov	Râșnov	Nizhny Tagil	Nizhny Tagil	Chaykovsky, Perm Krai	Chaykovsky, Perm Krai												0
2020/21	q	q	–	–	–	–	40	–	–	–	–	–	–												0
