= Picigin =

Croatian ball game

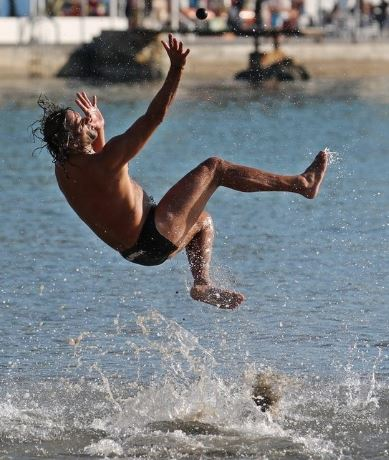
Picigin player playing the ball forward at Bačvice beach in Split, Croatia

Picigin (pronounced [pit͡sǐgiːn]) is traditional ball game from Split, Croatia that is played at the beach. It is an amateur sport played in shoals or other shallow water, usually consisting of cooperating players keeping a small ball aloft for as long as possible, with the game ending when the ball falls in the water.

== Origin ==
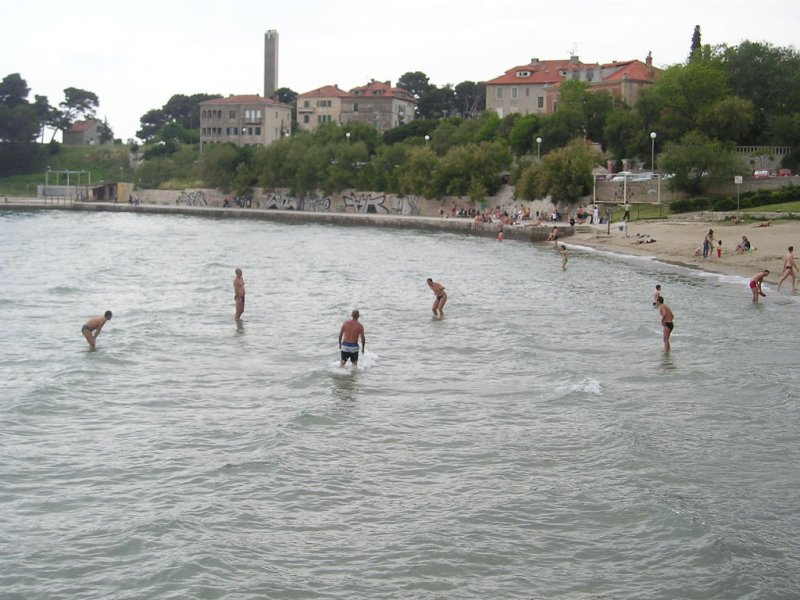
A game of picigin with five players

Picigin originated on the sandy beach of Bačvice in Split. It was first played in 1908 by a group of Croatian students returning from Prague who were finding it difficult to play the game of water polo in shallow water. Instead, they began playing a different game which would come to be known as picigin.

== Game characteristics ==
The game involves several players in a circle batting around a small ball with their hands; the objective is to keep the ball in the air and out of the water for as long as possible. Players are not allowed to catch the ball, but bounce it around with the palm of the hand to others. As such, the game somewhat resembles net-less volleyball, but it is played with a much smaller ball, usually a tennis ball stripped of felt. There is no set number of players, though five is usually average and customary. The game calls for agility as there is a lot of jumping and leaping involved in order to reach the ball in certain situations. As all players cooperate, the game by default is considered a non-competitive sport with no scoring system.

=== Rules ===
Since picigin is an amateur sport, there are no strict or formal rules, but it is played according to general tradition with little variation. The main goal in the most popular variant is to keep ball in the air without it falling in the water for as long as possible. In some game variants, a player is only allowed to touch the ball once or twice before passing it on to others, as in volleyball.

=== Players ===
There is no limit on the number of players, but the game is usually played with five players who stand as to form points of a pentagram-like shape. There are two traditional player roles or positions – sidrun and trkač. Two sidrun (pl. sidruni, Chakavian Croatian for "anchor") players remain anchored to their position and ensure that ball passing is stable while the other three players play as trkač (pl. trkači, Croatian for "runner"), tasked with chasing after and saving loose balls. The game does not call for any physical characteristics for either role, but trkač roles are optimally taken up by more agile players with higher stamina while sidrun role calls for above average height.

=== Terrain ===
As picigin often sees players jumping and landing on their body, it requires a soft surface in shoal or other shallow water to be played as intended without possibility of serious injury; this is usually a shallow sandy beach. Preferred depth is roughly ankle-deep for all players as to not greatly hinder movement.

=== Ball ===
Picigin is played with various small balls, but the traditional ball, called balun (Chakavian Croatian for "ball") is actually a tennis ball that has been stripped of its felt and polished off a few millimeters. As such, the balun is smoother, lighter and bounces more easily than a normal tennis ball.

== Tradition ==
The most traditional players believe it to be impossible to play picigin anywhere but on the sandy beach of Bačvice in Split, which is considered the game's spiritual home.

Picigin is played on Bačvice year round and, often at night in the summer (floodlights can be used in the dark). There is also a longstanding tradition of playing picigin on New Year's Day regardless of weather conditions, when the sea temperature is rarely above 15 °C.

In June 2008, picigin was pronounced a Croatian immaterial cultural good, for a period of three years, with pending plans for a permanent designation. That status was confirmed in 2013.

In September 2023, the centennial of picigin at Bačvice beach was commemorated with an unveiling of commemorative plaque.

=== Championships ===
Since 2005, the Picigin World Championship (Croatian: Prvenstvo svita u piciginu) is organized every year on Bačvice beach in Split. Until 2008, players were given a task to do certain jumps, but from 2008, the winner is selected according to the artistic impression of a whole group.

== Publications ==
- Vladan Papić, Ivan Granić & Hrvoje Turić: Picigin kao vodeni sport: početno istraživanje, scientific paper published in Acta Kinesiologica
