= Gábor Gellér =

Hungarian ski jumper

Gabor Geller (born 13 September 1958 in Budakeszi) is a Hungarian former ski jumper. He holds the Hungarian national record with 139 metres. His best World Cup placement is a 57th place from Innsbruck 1981. He first competed in World Cup 1979.

Geller also took part in the World Championships 1985 in Seefeld where he was 37th in the normal hill (K70) and 53rd in the large hill (k90). Nowadays the normal hill is K90 and large hills is K120. Geller retired in 1989.
