= Olavi Alakulppi =

Finnish skier and officer (1915–1990)

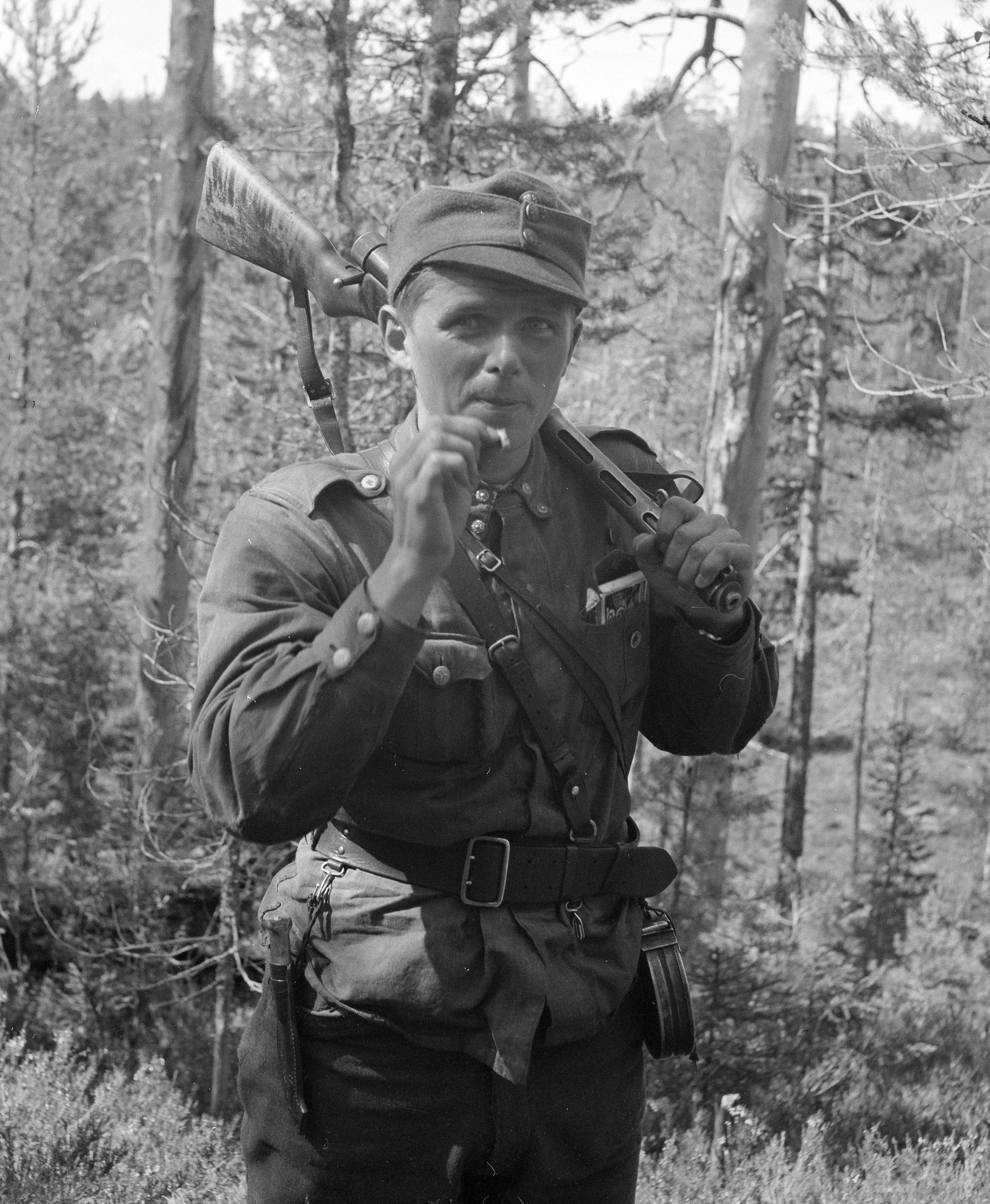
- Alakulppi during the Continuation War
- Born: 17 July 1915; Rovaniemi, Finland
- Died: 19 August 1990 (aged 75); Petersburg, Virginia, United States
- Military career
- Allegiance: Finland; United States
- Branch: Finnish Army; United States Army
- Rank: Captain (Finland); Lieutenant colonel (USA)
- Conflicts: World War II; Winter War; Continuation War; Korean War

Olavi Eelis Alakulppi (17 July 1915 – 19 August 1990) was a Finnish military officer and cross-country skier.

== Life and career ==
Alakulppi was born in Rovaniemi, Finland, to Elis and Senja Alakulppi (née Törmänen).

Alakulppi served in the Finnish Army during the Winter War and the Continuation War. In 1942, he was awarded the Mannerheim Cross.

In 1945, in order to evade prosecution for his involvement in the Weapons Cache Case, he skied to Sweden and arranged for his wife Eevi, their son Vesa, and him to travel to the United States, where he joined the United States Army. He then fought in the Korean War, and served in South Korea, Japan, and West Germany. Vesa Juhani Alakulppi eventually followed his father into the military and was killed in action during the Vietnam War.

Alakulppi retired from the US Army in 1968 as a lieutenant-colonel. He died in 1990 in Petersburg, Virginia, and is buried in the Arlington National Cemetery.

While Alakulppi served as a company commander in West Germany in the 1950s, his personal chauffeur was Elvis Presley, who was carrying out his military service.

During the late 1950s, Alakulppi requested a United Nations commission to investigate the Soviet partisan attacks as war crimes. He had personally witnessed the aftermath of the raid on Seitajärvi and submitted evidence in the form of newspaper reports and photos of the victims. However, the request was rejected and the case was not pursued further.

Alakulppi won a gold medal in the 4 ×10 km cross-country relay at the 1939 FIS Nordic World Ski Championships in Zakopane.

Olavi Alakulppi
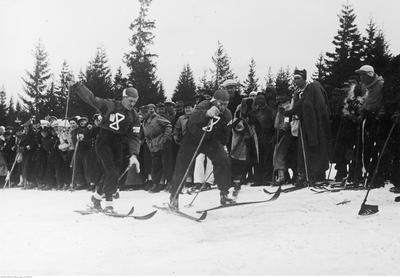
- Pauli Pitkänen and Alakulppi (right) in Zakopane

Medal record

Men's cross-country skiing

Representing Finland

World Championships
Gold medal – first place	1939 Zakopane	4 × 10 km relay

== In literature ==
Alakulppi has been the focus of several books.

Finland's 2008 War Book of the Year was awarded to non-fiction author Kari Kallonen for his work "Olavi Alakulppi, sissiluutnantti: Marskin ritari ja maailmanmestari." Kallonen is a well respected military historian and author who also won the 2016 War Book of the Year for his work "Tähtilippu talvisodassa – Amerikan Suomalaisen Legioonan tuntematon tarina."

Kallonen's 2008 book was translated into English in 2017 by Mika Roinila. The translation is entitled "Guerrilla Lieutenant – Olavi Alakulppi: Knight of the Mannerheim Cross and World Skiing Champion".

== Cross-country skiing results ==
=== World Championships ===
- 1 medal – (1 gold)

Year	Age	18 km	50 km	4 × 10 km relay
1938	22	22	—	—
1939	23	—	—	Gold
