= Eino Olkinuora =

Finnish cross-country skier

Medal record

Men's cross-country skiing

Representing Finland

World Championships
Gold medal – first place	1939 Zakopane	4 × 10 km relay

Eino Olkinuora (11 November 1915 in Kaukola – 20 October 1941) was a Finnish cross-country skier who competed in the 1930s. He won a gold medal in the 4 × 10 km relay at the 1939 FIS Nordic World Ski Championships in Zakopane.

Olkinuora was killed in action in Gavrilovskaya during World War II on 30 October 1941.

== Cross-country skiing results ==
=== World Championships ===
- 1 medal – (1 gold)

Year	Age	18 km	50 km	4 × 10 km relay
1938	22	46	—	—
1939	23	—	—	Gold
