= Polish medalists of the FIS Nordic World Ski Championships =

This is a list of Polish medalists of the FIS Nordic World Ski Championships. To be included in this list, they must have been representing Poland and have won at least one medal at the FIS Nordic World Ski Championships.

The first Polish medalist at the World Championships was Stanisław Marusarz, who in 1938 became the vice-champion in the ski jumping event on the large hill. In total, 18 Polish athletes have stood on the podium of the FIS Nordic World Ski Championships, including two under the "double championship" rule, where from 1924 to 1980, every Olympic medalist automatically became a World Championship medalist. Under this rule, the first Polish gold medalist at the World Championships was Wojciech Fortuna, who won Olympic gold in ski jumping in 1972. Additionally, world championship titles were won by Józef Łuszczek and Justyna Kowalczyk in cross-country skiing, and Adam Małysz, Kamil Stoch, Piotr Żyła, Dawid Kubacki, and Maciej Kot in ski jumping.

The most titled Polish athlete is Adam Małysz, who won the world championship title four times. Justyna Kowalczyk has won the most medals – eight. In 2011, Polish athletes won the most medals in a single championship edition – four. In 2003 and 2009, they achieved the highest number of gold medals – two each. The total number of medals won by Polish athletes is 34, including 21 in ski jumping, 11 in cross-country skiing, and 2 in Nordic combined.

Polish medalists of the FIS Nordic World Ski Championships
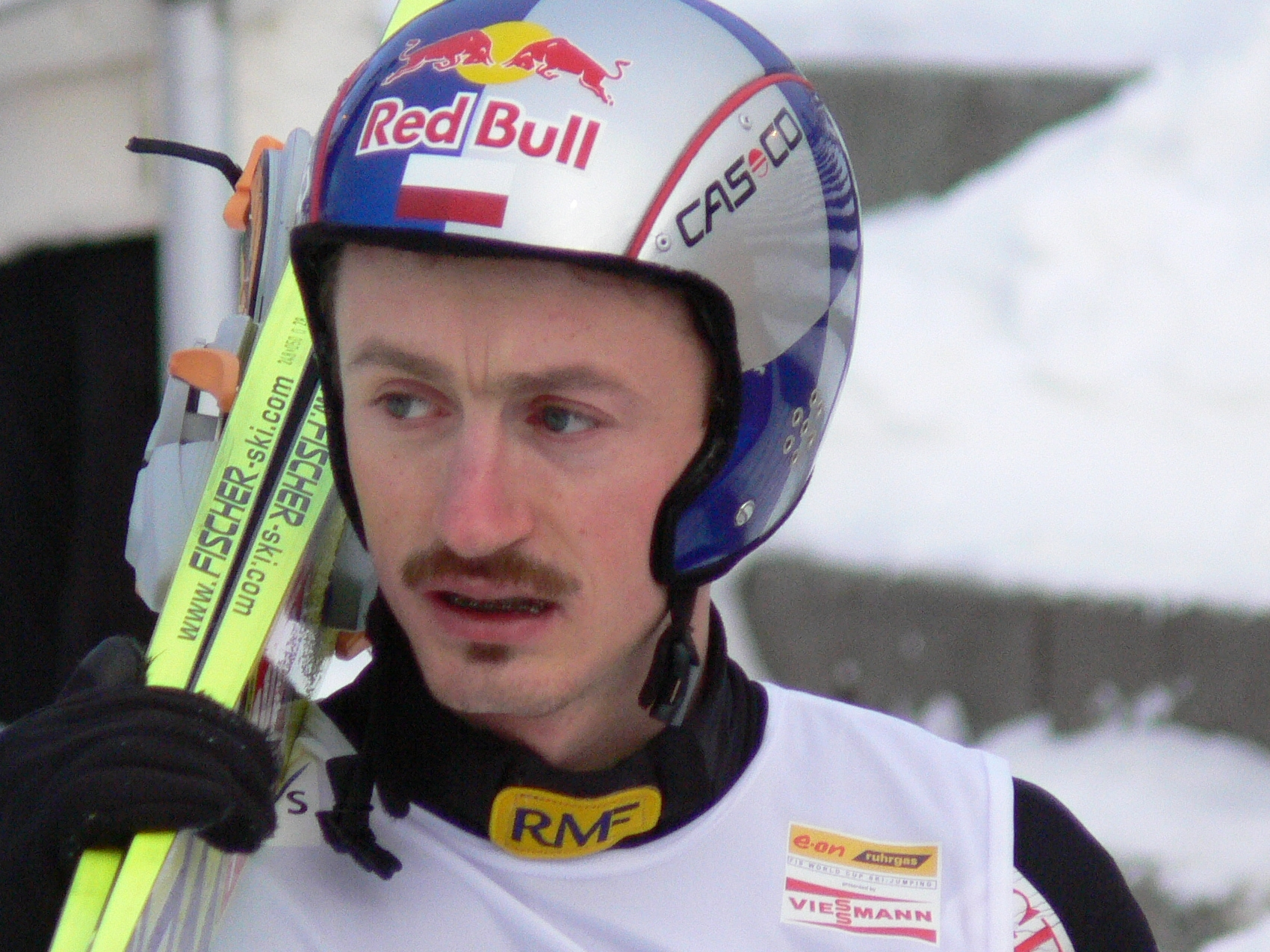
Adam Małysz – winner of four gold, one silver, and one bronze medal at the World Championships

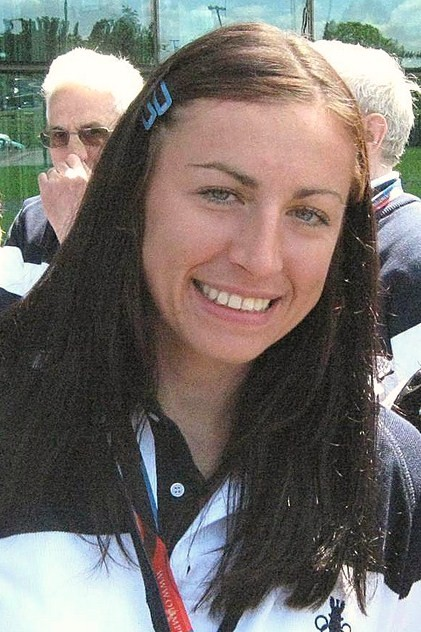
Justyna Kowalczyk – winner of two gold, three silver, and three bronze medals at the World Championships

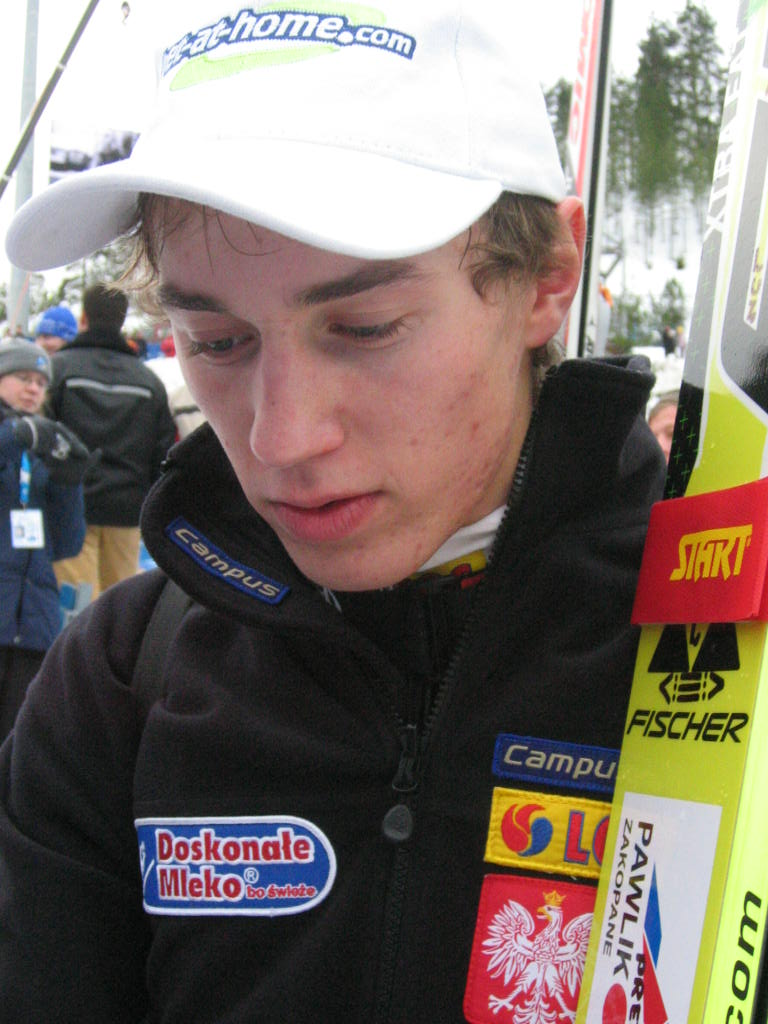
Kamil Stoch – winner of two gold, one silver, and three bronze medals at the World Championships

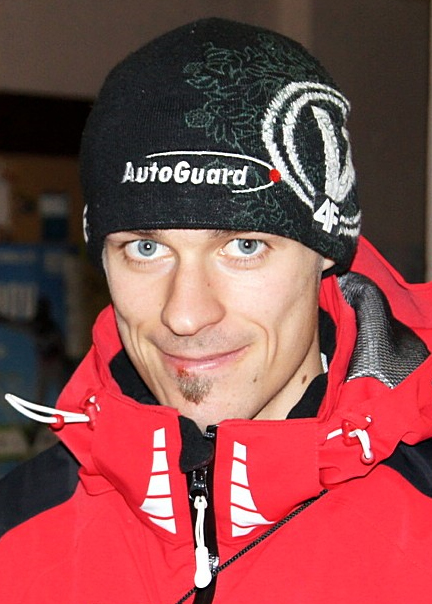
Piotr Żyła – two-time gold and four-time bronze medalist at the World Championships

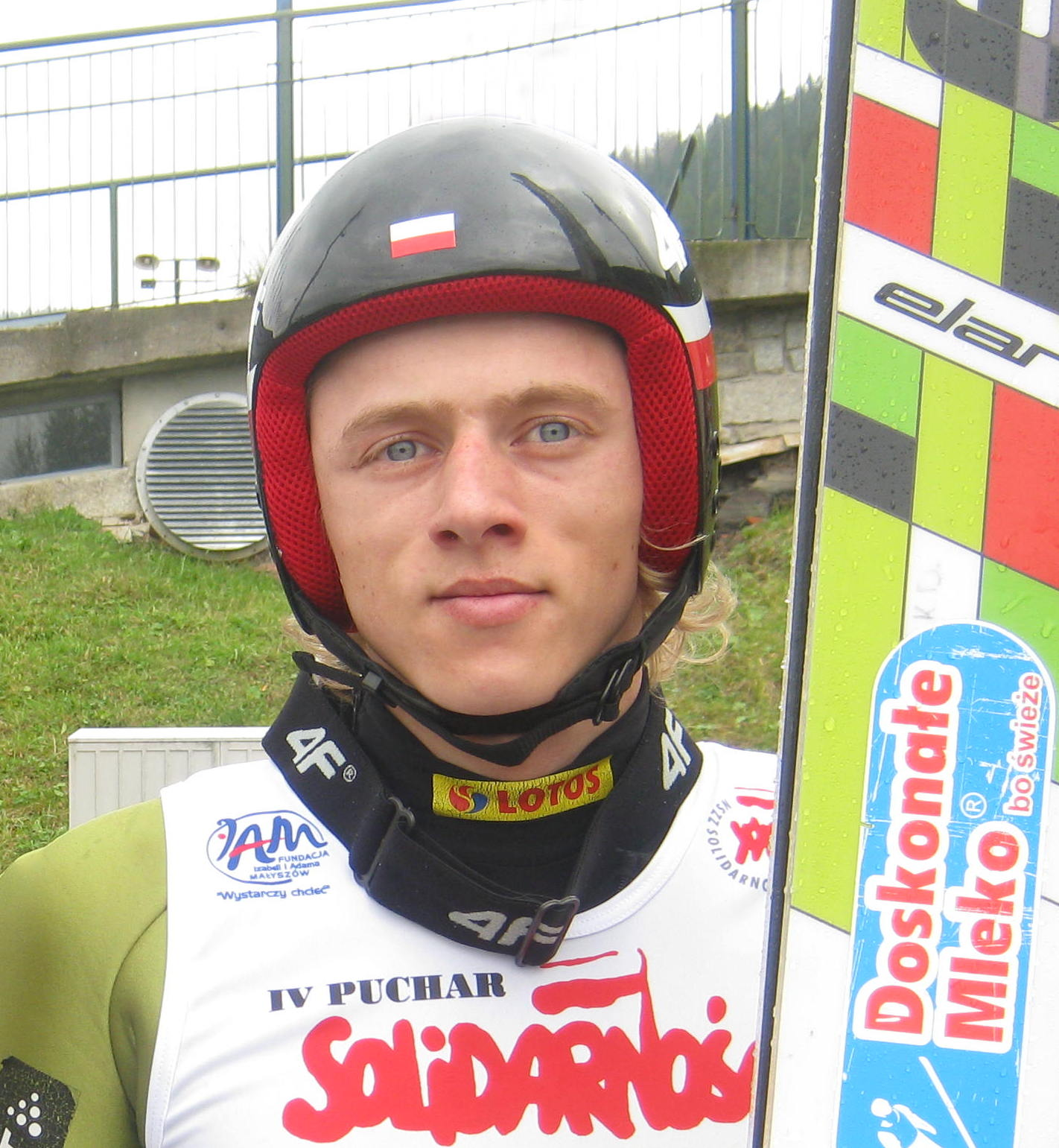
Dawid Kubacki – winner of two gold and two bronze medals at the World Championships

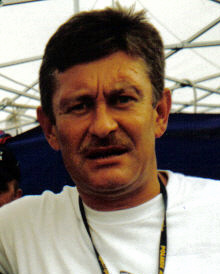
Józef Łuszczek – winner of one gold and one bronze medal at the World Championships

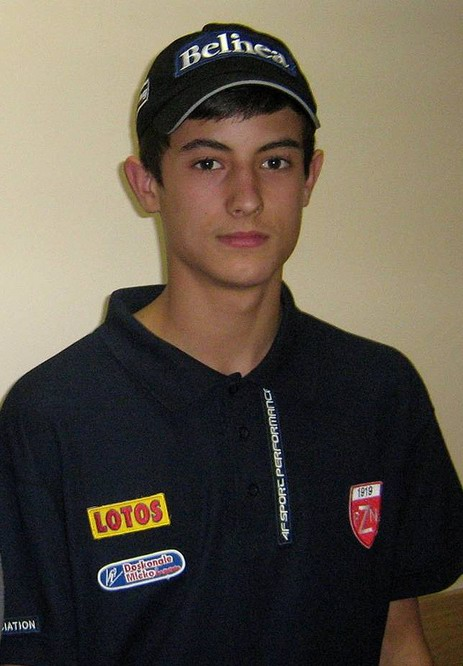
Maciej Kot – gold and bronze medalist at the World Championships

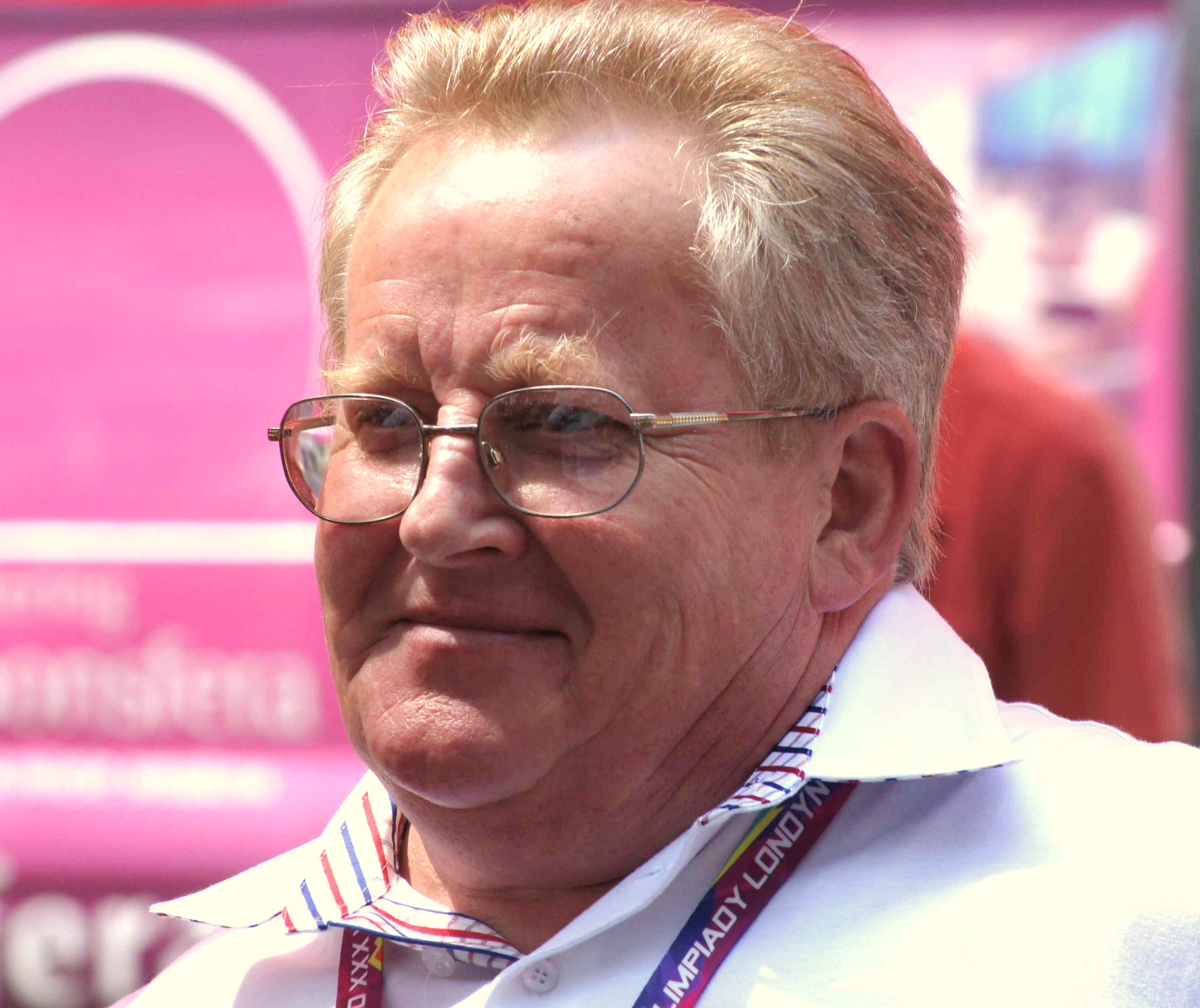
Wojciech Fortuna – gold medalist at the Olympic Games

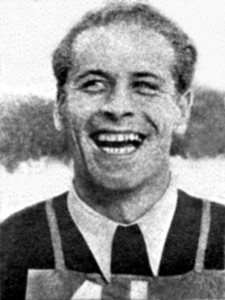
Stanisław Marusarz – silver medalist at the World Championships

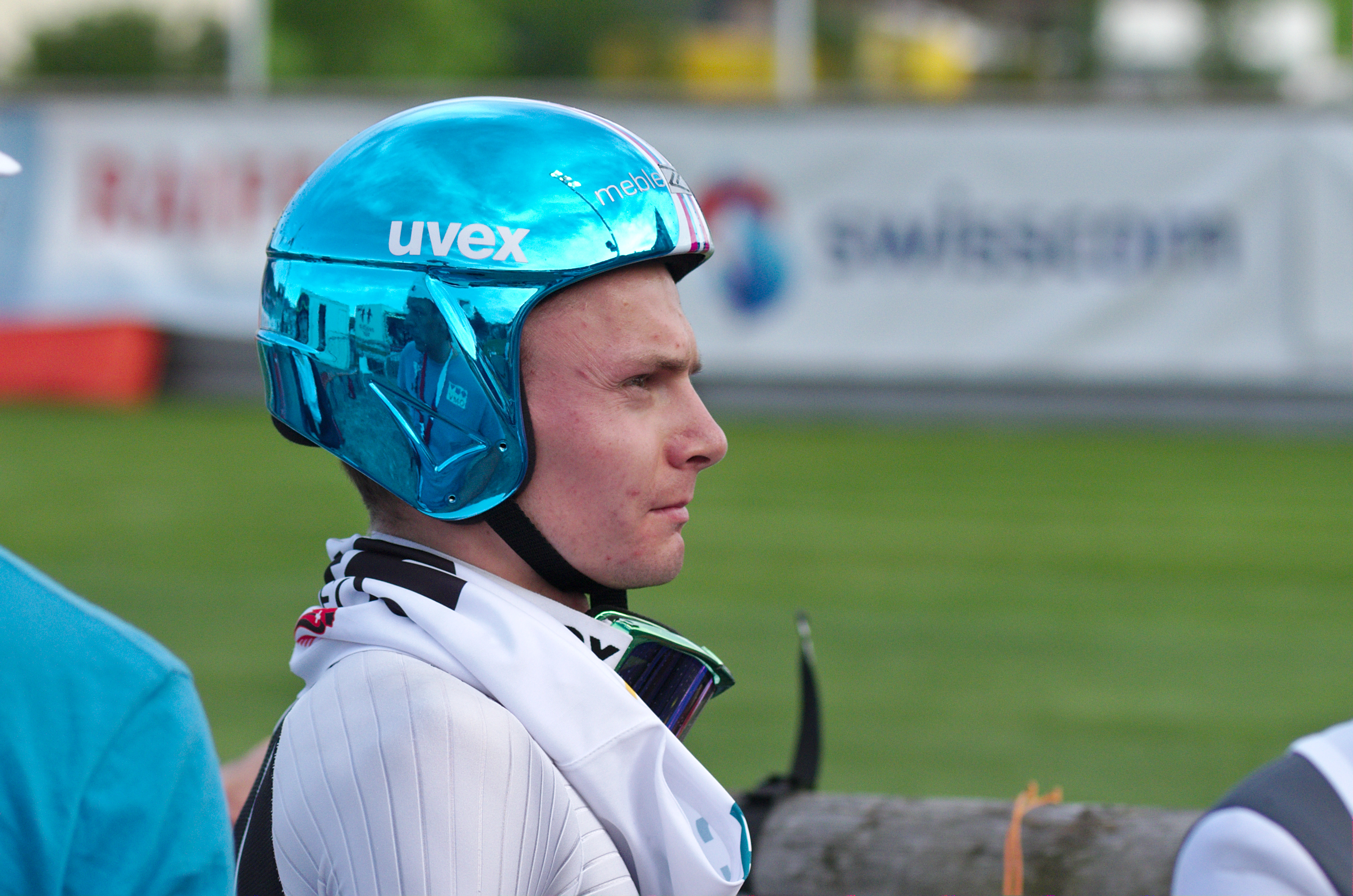
Jan Ziobro – bronze medalist at the World Championships

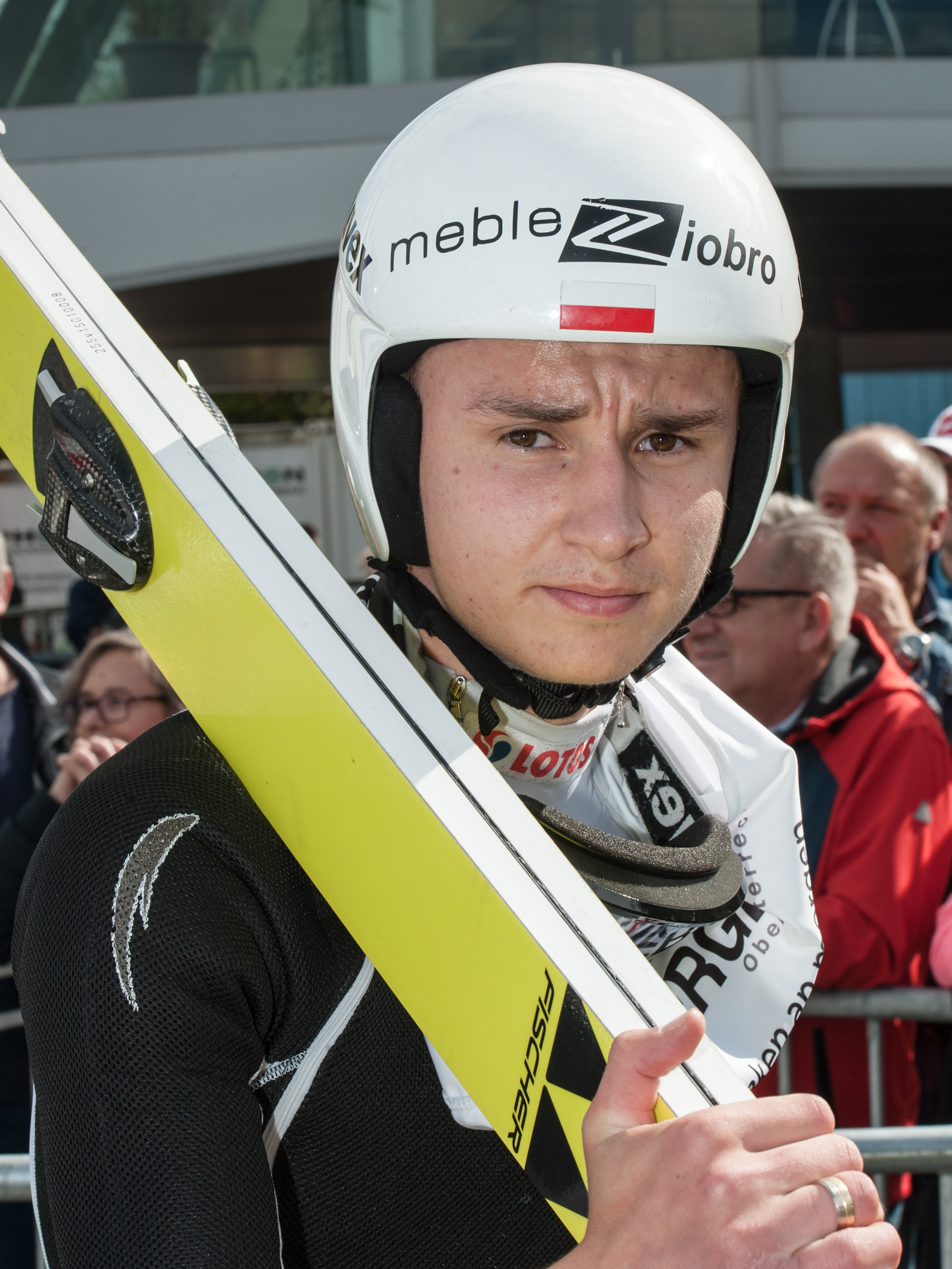
Klemens Murańka – bronze medalist at the World Championships

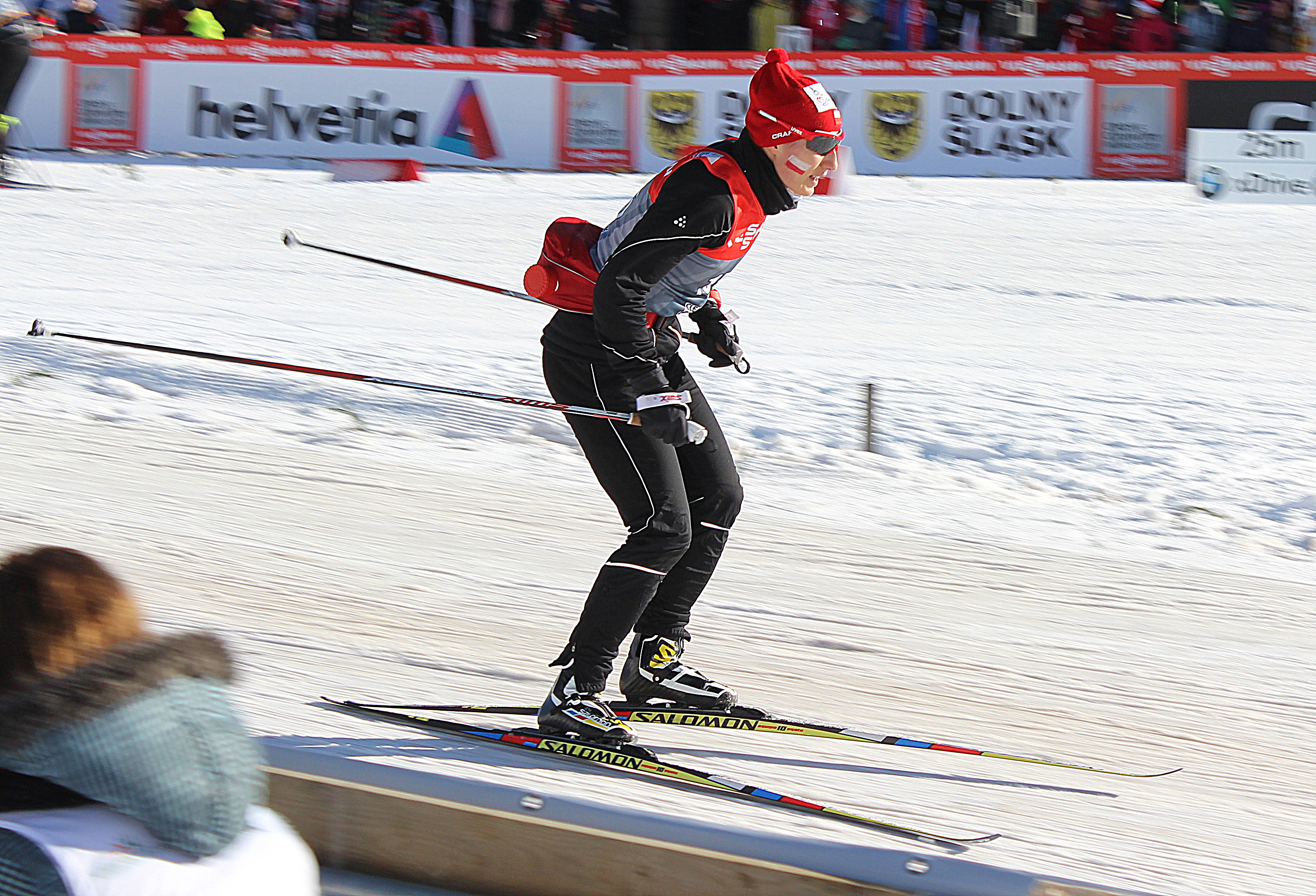
Sylwia Jaśkowiec – bronze medalist at the World Championships

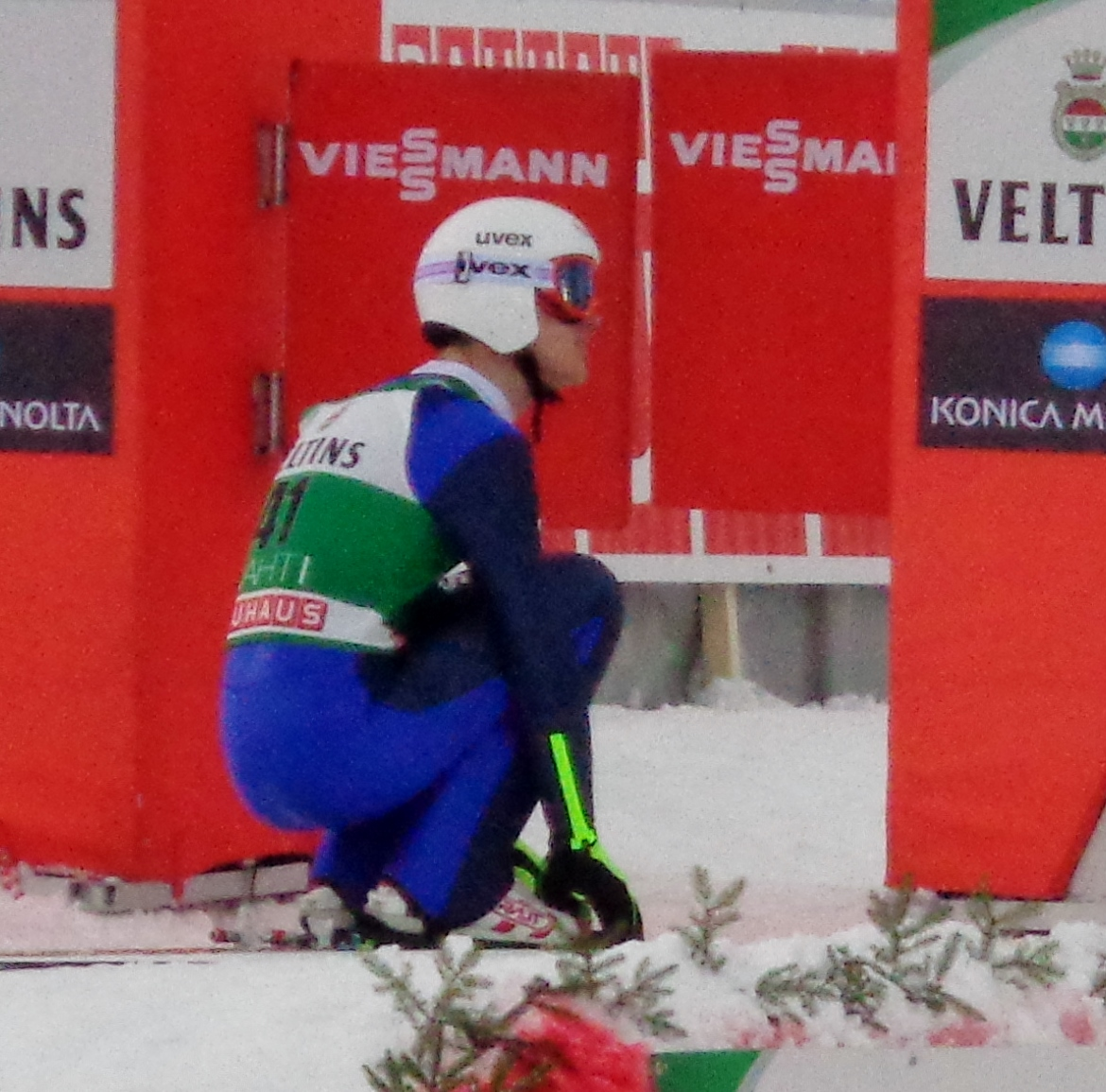
Andrzej Stękała – bronze medalist at the World Championships

== Medalists chronologically ==
The table lists Polish medalists of the World Championships in chronological order. Included are two Olympic medalists – Franciszek Gąsienica Groń and Wojciech Fortuna (highlighted in italics), who, under the "double championship" rule in effect until 1980, were simultaneously Olympic and World Championship medalists.

No.	Year and location	Medal	Medalist	Discipline	Event	Source
1.	1938, Lahti	Silver	Stanisław Marusarz	Ski jumping	Individual large hill	
2.	1956, Cortina d'Ampezzo	Bronze	Franciszek Gąsienica Groń	Nordic combined	Large hill ski jumping + 15 km run	
3.	1962, Zakopane	Silver	Antoni Łaciak	Ski jumping	Individual normal hill	
4.	1970, Vysoké Tatry	Bronze	Stanisław Gąsienica Daniel	Ski jumping	Individual large hill	
5.	1972, Sapporo	Gold	Wojciech Fortuna	Ski jumping	Individual large hill	
6.	1974, Falun	Bronze	Jan Staszel	Cross-country skiing	30 km classical	
7.	1974, Falun	Bronze	Stefan Hula	Nordic combined	Normal hill ski jumping + 15 km run	
8.	1978, Lahti	Bronze	Józef Łuszczek	Cross-country skiing	30 km classical	
9.	1978, Lahti	Gold	Józef Łuszczek	Cross-country skiing	15 km classical	
10.	2001, Lahti	Silver	Adam Małysz	Ski jumping	Individual large hill	
11.	2001, Lahti	Gold	Adam Małysz	Ski jumping	Individual normal hill	
12.	2003, Val di Fiemme	Gold	Adam Małysz	Ski jumping	Individual large hill	
13.	2003, Val di Fiemme	Gold	Adam Małysz	Ski jumping	Individual normal hill	
14.	2007, Sapporo	Gold	Adam Małysz	Ski jumping	Individual normal hill	
15.	2009, Liberec	Bronze	Justyna Kowalczyk	Cross-country skiing	10 km classical	
16.	2009, Liberec	Gold	Justyna Kowalczyk	Cross-country skiing	15 km pursuit	
17.	2009, Liberec	Gold	Justyna Kowalczyk	Cross-country skiing	30 km freestyle	
18.	2011, Oslo	Silver	Justyna Kowalczyk	Cross-country skiing	15 km pursuit	
19.	2011, Oslo	Bronze	Adam Małysz	Ski jumping	Individual normal hill	
20.	2011, Oslo	Silver	Justyna Kowalczyk	Cross-country skiing	10 km classical	
21.	2011, Oslo	Bronze	Justyna Kowalczyk	Cross-country skiing	30 km freestyle	
22.	2013, Val di Fiemme	Gold	Kamil Stoch	Ski jumping	Individual large hill	
23.	2013, Val di Fiemme	Silver	Justyna Kowalczyk	Cross-country skiing	30 km classical	
24.	2013, Val di Fiemme	Bronze	Maciej Kot; Piotr Żyła; Dawid Kubacki; Kamil Stoch	Ski jumping	Team large hill	
25.	2015, Falun	Bronze	Justyna Kowalczyk; Sylwia Jaśkowiec	Cross-country skiing	Team sprint	
26.	2015, Falun	Bronze	Piotr Żyła; Klemens Murańka; Jan Ziobro; Kamil Stoch	Ski jumping	Team large hill	
27.	2017, Lahti	Bronze	Piotr Żyła	Ski jumping	Individual large hill	
28.	2017, Lahti	Gold	Piotr Żyła; Dawid Kubacki; Maciej Kot; Kamil Stoch	Ski jumping	Team large hill	
29.	2019, Seefeld in Tirol	Gold	Dawid Kubacki	Ski jumping	Individual normal hill	
30.	2019, Seefeld in Tirol	Silver	Kamil Stoch	Ski jumping	Individual normal hill	
31.	2021, Oberstdorf	Gold	Piotr Żyła	Ski jumping	Individual normal hill	
32.	2021, Oberstdorf	Bronze	Piotr Żyła; Andrzej Stękała; Kamil Stoch; Dawid Kubacki	Ski jumping	Team large hill	
33.	2023, Planica	Gold	Piotr Żyła	Ski jumping	Individual normal hill	
34.	2023, Planica	Bronze	Dawid Kubacki	Ski jumping	Individual large hill	

== Medalists by discipline ==
=== Cross-country skiing ===
No.	Date	Location	Medal	Athlete	Distance	Technique	Time	Deficit	Winner	Source
1.	18 February 1974	(Sweden) Falun	Bronze	Jan Staszel	30 km	Classical	1:34:56.49	1:14.89	Thomas Magnusson	
2.	19 February 1978	(Finland) Lahti	Bronze	Józef Łuszczek	30 km	Classical	1:33:52.21	56.21	Sergey Savelyev	
3.	21 February 1978	(Finland) Lahti	Gold	Józef Łuszczek	15 km	Classical	49:09.37	–	–	
4.	19 February 2009	(Czech Republic) Liberec	Bronze	Justyna Kowalczyk	10 km	Classical	28:24.3	11.5	Aino-Kaisa Saarinen	
5.	21 February 2009	(Czech Republic) Liberec	Gold	Justyna Kowalczyk	7.5 km + 7.5 km	Classical, freestyle	40:55.3	–	–	
6.	28 February 2009	(Czech Republic) Liberec	Gold	Justyna Kowalczyk	30 km	Freestyle	1:16:10.6	–	–	
7.	26 February 2011	(Norway) Oslo	Silver	Justyna Kowalczyk	7.5 km + 7.5 km	Classical, freestyle	38:16.1	7.5	Marit Bjørgen	
8.	26 February 2011	(Norway) Oslo	Silver	Justyna Kowalczyk	10 km	Classical	27:43.4	4.1	Marit Bjørgen	
9.	5 March 2011	(Norway) Oslo	Bronze	Justyna Kowalczyk	30 km	Freestyle	1:25:19.1	1:34.0	Therese Johaug	
10.	2 March 2013	(Italy) Val di Fiemme	Silver	Justyna Kowalczyk	30 km	Classical	1:27:23.6	3.7	Marit Bjørgen	
11.	22 February 2015	(Sweden) Falun	Bronze	Justyna Kowalczyk; Sylwia Jaśkowiec	6 x 1.2 km	Freestyle	14:38.05	8.48	Norway; Ingvild Flugstad Østberg; Maiken Caspersen Falla	

=== Ski jumping ===
No.	Date	Location	Medal	Athlete	Hill	Jump 1	Jump 2	Jump 3	Score	Deficit	Winner	Source
1.	27 February 1938	(Finland) Lahti	Silver	Stanisław Marusarz	Large	66.0	67.0	–	226.1	0.3	Asbjørn Ruud	
2.	21 February 1962	(Poland) Zakopane	Silver	Antoni Łaciak	Normal	68.5	64.5	71.5	222.5	0.9	Toralf Engan	
3.	21 February 1970	(Czechoslovakia) Vysoké Tatry	Bronze	Stanisław Gąsienica Daniel	Large	92.0	100.5	–	211.8	14.2	Gariy Napalkov	
4.	11 February 1972	(Japan) Sapporo	Gold	Wojciech Fortuna	Large	111.0	87.5	–	219.9	–	–	
5.	19 February 2001	(Finland) Lahti	Silver	Adam Małysz	Large	126.0	128.5	–	273.5	2.8	Martin Schmitt	
6.	23 February 2001	(Finland) Lahti	Gold	Adam Małysz	Normal	89.5	98.0	–	246.0	–	–	
7.	22 February 2003	(Italy) Val di Fiemme	Gold	Adam Małysz	Large	134.0	136.0	–	289.0	–	–	
8.	28 February 2003	(Italy) Val di Fiemme	Gold	Adam Małysz	Normal	104.0	107.5	–	279.0	–	–	
9.	3 March 2007	(Japan) Sapporo	Gold	Adam Małysz	Normal	102.0	99.5	–	277.0	–	–	
10.	26 February 2011	(Norway) Oslo	Bronze	Adam Małysz	Normal	97.5	102.0	–	252.2	17.0	Thomas Morgenstern	
11.	28 February 2013	(Italy) Val di Fiemme	Gold	Kamil Stoch	Large	131.5	130.0	–	295.8	–	–	
12.	2 March 2013	(Italy) Val di Fiemme	Bronze	Maciej Kot	Large	123.0	128.5	–	1121.0	14.9	Austria; Wolfgang Loitzl; Manuel Fettner; Thomas Morgenstern; Gregor Schlierenzauer	
12.	2 March 2013	(Italy) Val di Fiemme	Bronze	Piotr Żyła	Large	122.0	126.0	–	1121.0	14.9	Austria; Wolfgang Loitzl; Manuel Fettner; Thomas Morgenstern; Gregor Schlierenzauer	
12.	2 March 2013	(Italy) Val di Fiemme	Bronze	Dawid Kubacki	Large	126.0	128.0	–	1121.0	14.9	Austria; Wolfgang Loitzl; Manuel Fettner; Thomas Morgenstern; Gregor Schlierenzauer	
12.	2 March 2013	(Italy) Val di Fiemme	Bronze	Kamil Stoch	Large	134.0	130.0	–	1121.0	14.9	Austria; Wolfgang Loitzl; Manuel Fettner; Thomas Morgenstern; Gregor Schlierenzauer	
13.	28 February 2015	(Sweden) Falun	Bronze	Piotr Żyła	Large	123.0	123.5	–	848.1	24.5	Norway; Anders Bardal; Anders Jacobsen; Anders Fannemel; Rune Velta	
13.	28 February 2015	(Sweden) Falun	Bronze	Klemens Murańka	Large	120.5	128.0	–	848.1	24.5	Norway; Anders Bardal; Anders Jacobsen; Anders Fannemel; Rune Velta	
13.	28 February 2015	(Sweden) Falun	Bronze	Jan Ziobro	Large	116.0	125.5	–	848.1	24.5	Norway; Anders Bardal; Anders Jacobsen; Anders Fannemel; Rune Velta	
13.	28 February 2015	(Sweden) Falun	Bronze	Kamil Stoch	Large	129.5	126.0	–	848.1	24.5	Norway; Anders Bardal; Anders Jacobsen; Anders Fannemel; Rune Velta	
14.	2 March 2017	(Finland) Lahti	Bronze	Piotr Żyła	Large	127.5	131.0	–	276.7	2.6	Stefan Kraft	
15.	4 March 2017	(Finland) Lahti	Gold	Piotr Żyła	Large	130.5	123.0	–	1104.2	–	–	
15.	4 March 2017	(Finland) Lahti	Gold	Dawid Kubacki	Large	129.0	119.5	–	1104.2	–	–	
15.	4 March 2017	(Finland) Lahti	Gold	Maciej Kot	Large	130.5	121.5	–	1104.2	–	–	
15.	4 March 2017	(Finland) Lahti	Gold	Kamil Stoch	Large	130.5	124.5	–	1104.2	–	–	
16.	1 March 2019	(Austria) Seefeld in Tirol	Gold	Dawid Kubacki	Normal	93.0	104.5	–	218.3	–	–	
17.	1 March 2019	(Austria) Seefeld in Tirol	Silver	Kamil Stoch	Normal	91.5	101.5	–	215.5	2.8	Dawid Kubacki	
18.	27 February 2021	(Germany) Oberstdorf	Gold	Piotr Żyła	Normal	105.0	102.5	–	268.8	–	–	
19.	6 March 2021	(Germany) Oberstdorf	Bronze	Piotr Żyła	Large	139.0	139.0	–	1031.2	15.4	Germany; Pius Paschke; Severin Freund; Markus Eisenbichler; Karl Geiger	
19.	6 March 2021	(Germany) Oberstdorf	Bronze	Andrzej Stękała	Large	122.5	127.0	–	1031.2	15.4	Germany; Pius Paschke; Severin Freund; Markus Eisenbichler; Karl Geiger	
19.	6 March 2021	(Germany) Oberstdorf	Bronze	Kamil Stoch	Large	133.0	132.5	–	1031.2	15.4	Germany; Pius Paschke; Severin Freund; Markus Eisenbichler; Karl Geiger	
19.	6 March 2021	(Germany) Oberstdorf	Bronze	Dawid Kubacki	Large	131.0	127.5	–	1031.2	15.4	Germany; Pius Paschke; Severin Freund; Markus Eisenbichler; Karl Geiger	
20.	25 February 2023	(Slovenia) Planica	Gold	Piotr Żyła	Normal	97.5	105.0	–	261.8	–	–	
21.	3 March 2023	(Slovenia) Planica	Bronze	Dawid Kubacki	Large	129.0	135.0	–	276.2	11.3	Timi Zajc	

=== Nordic combined ===
No.	Date	Location	Medal	Athlete	Jump 1	Jump 2	Jump 3	Score	Run	Total	Deficit	Winner	Source
1.	29–31 January 1956	(Italy) Cortina d'Ampezzo	Bronze	Franciszek Gąsienica Groń	60.0	101.5	101.5	203.0	233.8	436.8	18.2	Sverre Stenersen	
2.	19 February 1974	(Sweden) Falun	Bronze	Stefan Hula	84.5	79.5	–	228.4	189.53	417.93	3.21	Ulrich Wehling	
