= Sven Hansson =

Swedish cross-country skier

Medal record

Men's cross-country skiing

Representing Sweden

World Championships
Bronze medal – third place	1938 Lahti	4 × 10 km relay

Sven Hansson (March 16, 1912 – July 14, 1971) was a Swedish cross-country skier who competed in the 1930s. He won a bronze medal in the 4 × 10 km relay at the 1938 FIS Nordic World Ski Championships in Lahti. His best individual finish was fourth in the 18 km event at the 1937 FIS Nordic World Ski Championships.

In 1936, he won Vasaloppet.

== Cross-country skiing results ==
All results are sourced from the International Ski Federation (FIS).

=== World Championships ===
- 1 medal – (1 bronze)

Year	Age	18 km	50 km	4 × 10 km relay
1937	24	4	—	4
1938	25	15	16	Bronze
