= Carl Pahlin =

Swedish cross-country skier

Medal record

Men's cross-country skiing

Representing Sweden

World Championships
Silver medal – second place	1939 Zakopane	4 × 10 km relay
Bronze medal – third place	1939 Zakopane	18 km

Carl Pahlin (28 January 1915 – 5 January 2010) was a Swedish cross-country skier who competed in the 1930s. He won two medals at the 1939 FIS Nordic World Ski Championships with a silver in the 4 × 10 km relay and a bronze in the 18 km event.

== Cross-country skiing results ==
All results are sourced from the International Ski Federation (FIS).

=== World Championships ===
- 2 medals – (1 gold, 1 bronze)

Year	Age	18 km	50 km	4 × 10 km relay
1939	24	Bronze	—	Silver
