= Ragnar Ringstad =

Norwegian cross-country skier

Medal record

Men's cross-country skiing

Representing Norway

World Championships
Silver medal – second place	1938 Lahti	4 × 10 km relay

Ragnar Ringstad was a Norwegian cross-country skier who competed in the 1930s. He won a silver medal in the 4 × 10 km relay at the 1938 FIS Nordic World Ski Championships in Lahti.
