= Donald Johansson =

Swedish cross-country skier (1913–2004)

Medal record

Men's cross-country skiing

Representing Sweden

World Championships
Bronze medal – third place	1938 Lahti	4 × 10 km relay

Donald Johansson (August 29, 1913 – 9 September 2004) was a Swedish cross-country skier who competed in the 1930s. He won a bronze medal in the 4 × 10 km relay at the 1938 FIS Nordic World Ski Championships in Lahti.

== Cross-country skiing results ==
=== World Championships ===
- 1 medal – (1 bronze)

Year	Age	18 km	50 km	4 × 10 km relay
1938	24	30	—	Bronze
