= Martti Lauronen =

Finnish cross-country skier

Medal record

Men's cross-country skiing

Representing Finland

World Championships
| Gold medal – first place | 1938 Lahti | 4 × 10 km relay |

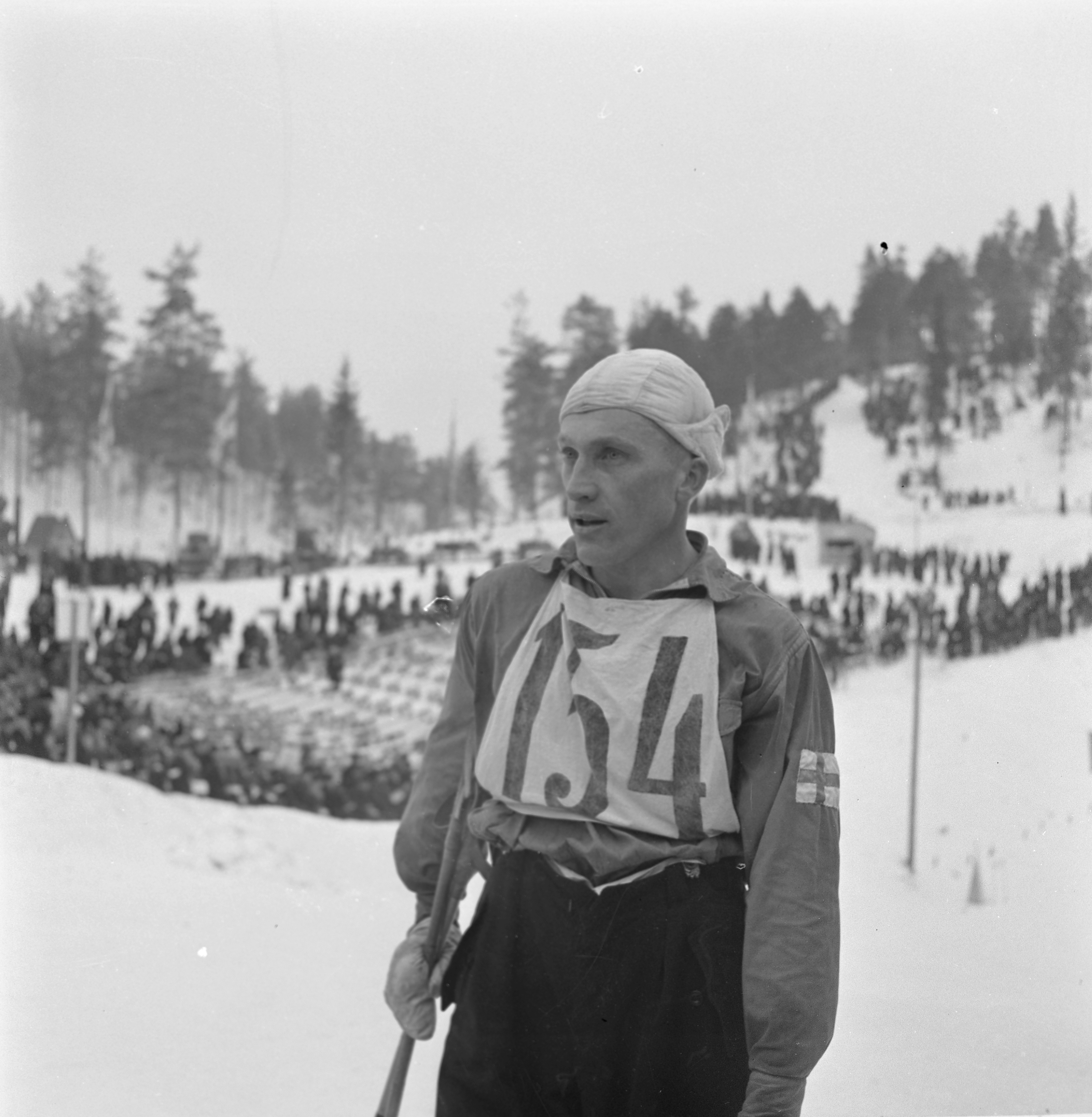
Martti Lauronen in Lahti 1938

Martti Lauronen (15 October 1913 – 4 June 1987) was a Finnish cross-country skier who competed in the 1930s. He won a gold medal in the 4 × 10 km relay at the 1938 FIS Nordic World Ski Championships. He finished fifth in the 18 km event in those same games.

== Cross-country skiing results ==
All results are sourced from the International Ski Federation (FIS).

=== World Championships ===
- 1 medal – (1 gold)

| Year | Age | 18 km | 50 km | 4 × 10 km relay |
|---|---|---|---|---|
| 1938 | 24 | 5 | — | Gold |
