= Sigurd Nilsson =

Swedish cross-country skier

Medal record

Men's cross-country skiing

Representing Sweden

World Championships
Bronze medal – third place	1938 Lahti	4 × 10 km relay

Sigurd Nilsson (January 11, 1910 – February 12, 1972) was a Swedish cross-country skier who competed in the 1930s. He won a bronze medal in the 4 × 10 km relay at the 1938 FIS Nordic World Ski Championships in Lahti.

== Cross-country skiing results ==
=== World Championships ===
- 1 medal – (1 bronze)

Year	Age	18 km	50 km	4 × 10 km relay
1938	28	35	—	Bronze
