= Stenvall =

Stenvall is a surname. Notable people with the surname include:

- Alexis Stenvall (1834–1872), birth name of Finnish author Aleksis Kivi
- Kaj Stenvall (born 1951), Finnish artist
- Oscar Stenvall (1856-1916), Swedish painter
- Selm Stenvall (1914–1995), Swedish cross-country skier
