= Arne Larsen (cross-country skier) =

Norwegian cross-country skier

Medal record

Men's cross-country skiing

Representing Norway

World Championships
Silver medal – second place	1938 Lahti	4 × 10 km relay

Arne Larsen (7 July 1909 – 29 May 1981) was a Norwegian cross-country skier who competed in the 1930s. He won a silver medal in the 4 × 10 km relay at the 1938 FIS Nordic World Ski Championships in Lahti.

He also competed in long-distance running. At the Norwegian athletics championships he won silver medals in both 5000 and 10,000 metres in both 1938 and 1939. He also won bronze medals in cross-country running in 1937 and 1938. Each of these races were won by Odd Rasdal. Larsen represented Hamar IL in 1937 and Ottestad IL from 1938.

For his achievements in multiple sports he received the Egebergs Ærespris in 1939, the last winner before the start of World War II.

== Cross-country skiing results ==
=== World Championships ===
Year	Age	18 km	50 km	4 × 10 km relay
1938	28	85	—	Silver

Preceded by Henry Johansen	Egebergs Ærespris; 1939	Succeeded by Godtfred Holmvang
