= John Westbergh =

Swedish Nordic combined skier

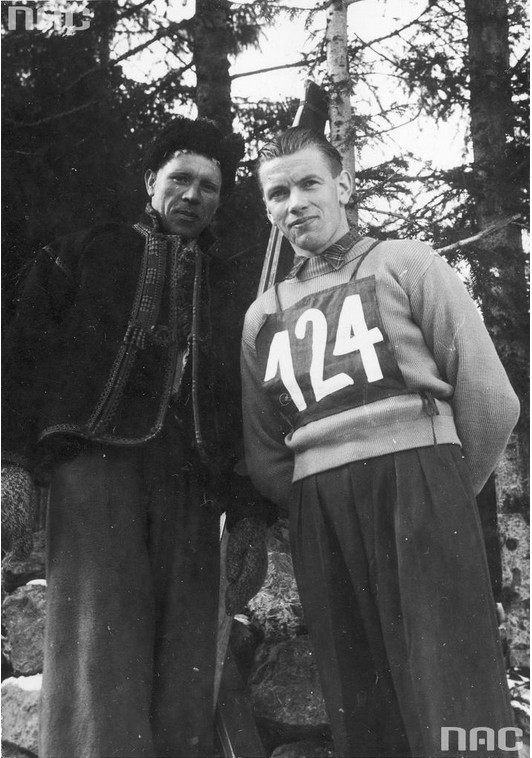

Medal record

Representing Sweden

Men's cross-country skiing

World Championships
Silver medal – second place	1939 Zakopane	4 × 10 km relay

Men's Nordic combined

World Championships
Silver medal – second place	1938 Lahti	Individual

John Westbergh (6 August 1915 – 12 November 2002) was a Swedish Nordic skier who competed in the 1930s. In the military patrol event at the 1936 Summer Olympics he won the bronze medal with his Swedish team. He won two silver medals at the FIS Nordic World Ski Championships, in 1938 (Nordic combined) and in 1939 (cross-country skiing 4 × 10 km relay).

Westbergh also won the 18 km event at the 1938 Holmenkollen ski festival.

== Cross-country skiing results ==
=== World Championships ===
- 1 medal – (1 silver)

Year	Age	18 km	50 km	4 × 10 km relay
1938	22	28	—	—
1939	23	—	—	Silver
