= Alvar Rantalahti =

Finnish cross-country skier

Medal record

Men's cross-country skiing

Representing Finland

World Championships
Silver medal – second place	1938 Lahti	50 km

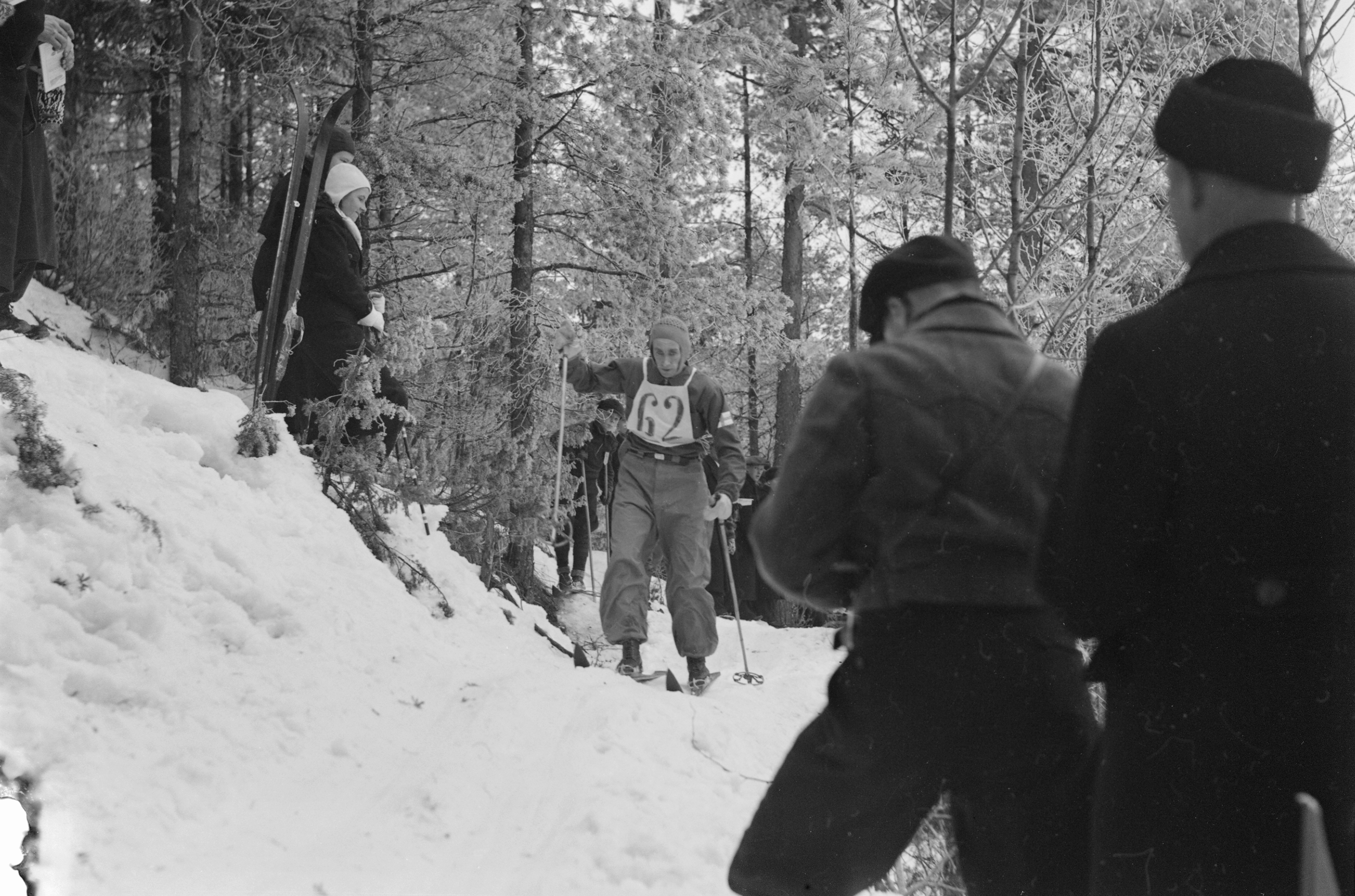
Alvar Rantalahti at the 1938 World Championships in Lahti at the 50 km event.

Alvar Rantalahti (July 29, 1913 – January 30, 2007) was a Finnish cross-country skier who competed in the late 1930s. He won a silver medal at the 1938 FIS Nordic World Ski Championships in the 50 km.

In 1941, Rantalahti shot a Soviet prisoner of war who'd spoken back to him and resisted his commands. After the war, he went into hiding in northern Sweden, and remained in hiding until 1948. Rantalahti then came forward and was put on trial for the unlawful execution. He was found guilty of involuntary manslaughter and sentenced to one year in prison. He was pardoned by President Juho Kusti Paasikivi in 1950.

== Cross-country skiing results ==
All results are sourced from the International Ski Federation (FIS).

=== World Championships ===
- 1 medal – (1 silver)

Year	Age	18 km	50 km	4 × 10 km relay
1938	24	—	Silver	—
