= Henry Johansen =

Norwegian footballer and manager (1904-1988)

Henry "Tippen" Johansen
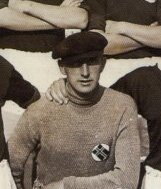

Personal information
- Full name: Henry Johansen
- Date of birth: 21 July 1904
- Place of birth: Kristiania, Norway
- Date of death: 29 May 1988 (aged 83)
- Position: Goalkeeper

Senior career*
Years	Team	Apps	(Gls)
1923–46	Vålerenga		

International career
1926–38	Norway	48	(0)

Managerial career
- 1944: Vålerenga
- 1949: Vålerenga
- * Club domestic league appearances and goals

Olympic medal record

Men's football
Bronze medal – third place	1936 Berlin	Team

Henry "Tippen" Johansen (21 July 1904 – 29 May 1988) was a Norwegian footballer who played as a goalkeeper for Vålerenga. He later managed the club.

== Football ==
=== Playing career ===
==== Club career ====
At club level, he played for Vålerenga from 1923 to 1946.

==== International career ====
Johansen made his debut for the national team in 1926 and played his last match in 1938. He participated in the 1936 Summer Olympics in Berlin, where Norway won a surprising bronze medal. He was also the Norwegian goalkeeper at the 1938 FIFA World Cup.

=== Coaching career ===
He managed Vålerenga two times; once in 1944, the second in 1949.

== Other sports ==
"Tippen", also active in ski jumping, was awarded Egebergs Ærespris in 1938. He also practised ice hockey and bandy to a certain extent.

His autobiography, På vakt i Norges mål, was published in 1941.

Preceded by Johan Haanes	Egebergs Ærespris; 1938	Succeeded by Arne Larsen
