= Alvar Hägglund =

Swedish cross-country skier

Medal record

Men's cross country skiing

World Championships
Silver medal – second place	1939 Zakopane	4 x 10 km

Alvar Hägglund (1913–1996) was a Swedish cross-country skier who competed in the 1930s. He won a silver medal in the 4 x 10 km at the 1939 FIS Nordic World Ski Championships in Zakopane. He also finished 6th in the 50 km event at those same games.
