= Selm Stenvall =

Swedish cross-country skier

Medal record

Men's cross-country skiing

Representing Sweden

World Championships
Silver medal – second place	1939 Zakopane	4 × 10 km relay

Selm Stenvall (May 5, 1914 – May 28, 1995) was a Swedish cross-country skier who competed in the 1930s and 1940s.

== Career ==
Stenvall won a silver medal in the 4 × 10 km relay at the 1939 FIS Nordic World Ski Championships in Zakopane. He also won second place in the 1946 Vasaloppet, with 6:13:53 as his time.

== Cross-country skiing results ==
=== World Championships ===
- 1 medal – (1 silver)

Year	Age	18 km	50 km	4 × 10 km relay
1939	24	—	—	Silver
