= Magnar Fosseide =

Norwegian Nordic combined skier

Medal record

Men's Nordic combined

World Championships
Bronze medal – third place	1939 Zakopane	Individual

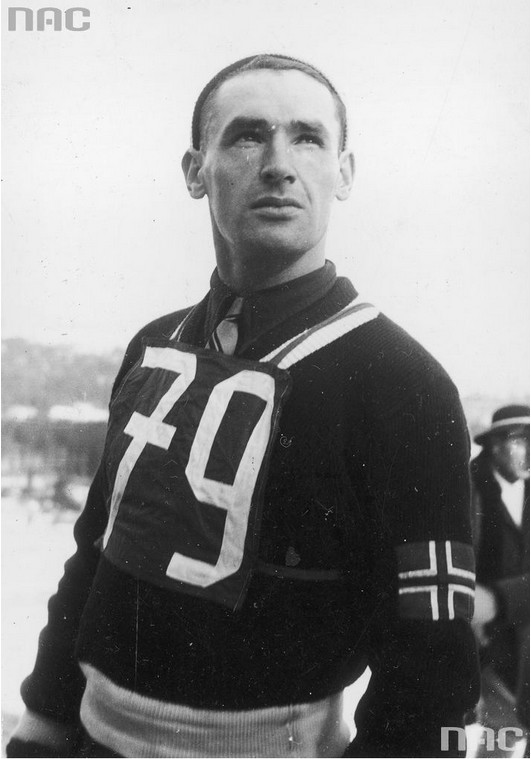

Magnar Fosseide (August 19, 1913 – October 1983) was a Norwegian Nordic combined skier who competed in the 1930s. He won a bronze medal in the individual event at the 1939 FIS Nordic World Ski Championships in Zakopane.
