= Pauli Pitkänen =

Finnish cross-country skier

Medal record

Men's cross-country skiing

Representing Finland

World Championships
Gold medal – first place	1938 Lahti	18 km
Gold medal – first place	1938 Lahti	4 × 10 km relay
Gold medal – first place	1939 Zakopane	4 × 10 km relay

Pauli Pitkänen (4 November 1911 – 28 September 1941) was a Finnish cross-country skier who competed in the 1930s. He won three gold medals at the FIS Nordic World Ski Championships with two in 1938 (18 km and 4 × 10 km relay) and one in 1939 (4 × 10 km relay). He was born in Nilsiä. He was killed during the Continuation War.

== Cross-country skiing results ==
All results are sourced from the International Ski Federation (FIS).

=== World Championships ===
- 3 medals – (3 gold)

Year	Age	18 km	50 km	4 × 10 km relay
1938	26	Gold	—	Gold
1939	27	—	—	Gold
