= Gustaf Adolf Sellin =

Swedish skier

Medal record

Men's Nordic combined

World Championships
Silver medal – second place	1939 Zakopane	Individual

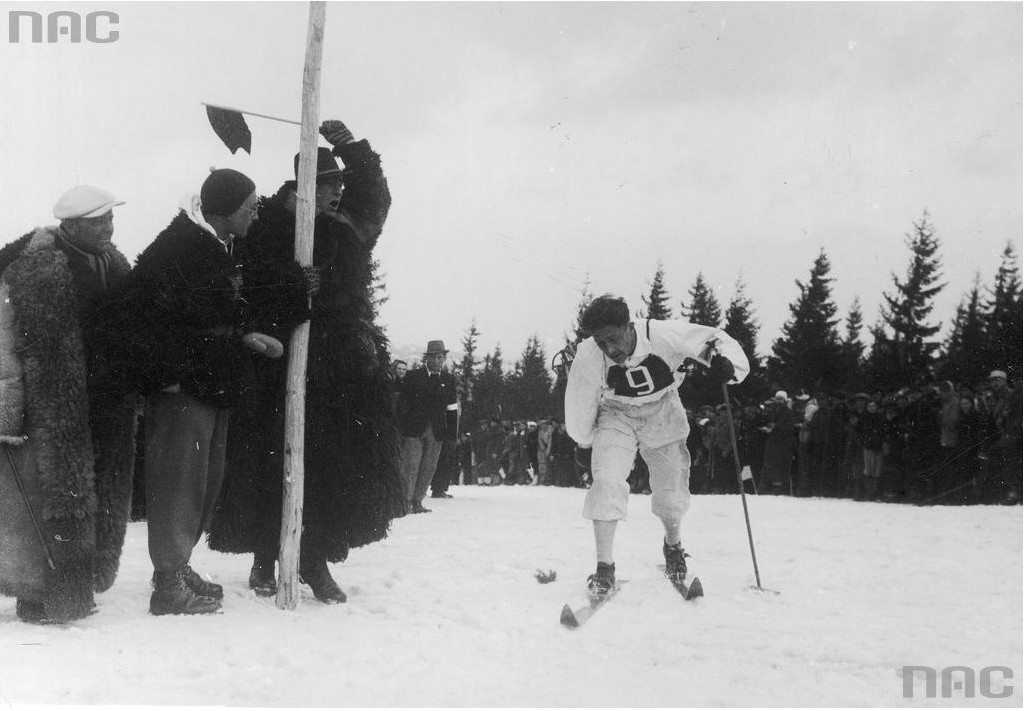

Gustaf Adolf Sellin was a Swedish Nordic combined skier who competed in the 1930s. He won a silver medal in the individual event at the 1939 FIS Nordic World Ski Championships in Zakopane.
