= Olympiaregion Seefeld =

Coordinates: 47.3292°N 11.1869°E

Region Seefeld
- Formation: 2003; 23 years ago
- Type: Gemeindeverband
- Headquarters: Kirchplatzl 128a, 6105 Leutasch
- Location: Seefeld i.T.
- Members: Buchen, Leutasch, Mösern, Reith bei Seefeld, Scharnitz, Seefeld in Tyrol
- Leader: Elias Walser
- Website: www.seefeld.com

Olympiaregion Seefeld (Tyrol, Austria)

The Region Seefeld is a tourist region in Tyrol, Austria. It provides the entire infrastructure of a Nordic centre for winter sport and a wide range of facilities for the summer season.

== Geography ==
The region is made up of the municipalities of Seefeld in Tirol, Leutasch, Reith bei Seefeld, Scharnitz and the two villages in the municipality of Telfs: Mösern and Buchen. Seefeld is the main centre of the region.

The region covers the Seefeld Plateau, Leutasch valley and Scharnitz Basin.

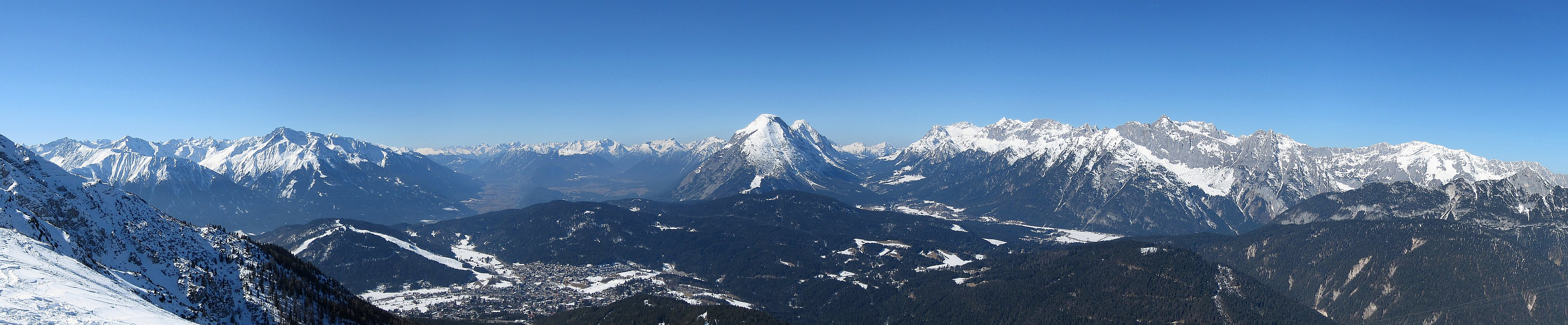
View from the Seefelder Joch over the Seefelder Plateau (foreground, with Seefeld on the left) to the Sellrain Hills, Upper Inn valley, Mieming Plateau, Hohe Munde, Gaistal/Leutaschtal and Wetterstein massif
