= FIS Nordic World Ski Championships 1939 =

International Nordic skiing competition

- Program cover for the FIS Nordic World Ski Championships 1939. (in Polish)
- Host city: Zakopane
- Country: Poland
- Events: 5
- Opening: 11 February 1939
- Closing: 19 February 1939

The FIS Nordic World Ski Championships 1939 took place February 11–19, 1939 in Zakopane, Poland. This was the Polish city's second time hosting the championships after having done so in 1929. It also marked the last time the event officially took place before World War II and the last time that these championships would be held on an annual basis (combined with the Winter Olympics) which they had been done since 1924.

== Men's cross country ==
=== 18 km ===
February 15, 1939

Medal	Athlete	Time
Gold	Jussi Kurikkala (FIN)	1:05:30
Silver	Klaes Karppinen (FIN)	1:06:05
Bronze	Carl Pahlin (SWE)	1:06:35

=== 50 km ===
February 17, 1939

Medal	Athlete	Time
Gold	Lars Bergendahl (NOR)	2:57:43
Silver	Klaes Karppinen (FIN)	3:00:27
Bronze	Oscar Gjøslien (NOR)	3:05:42

=== 4 × 10 km relay ===
February 19, 1939

Medal	Team	Time
Gold	Finland (Pauli Pitkänen, Olavi Alakulppi, Eino Olkinuora, Klaes Karppinen)	2:08:35
Silver	Sweden (Alvar Hägglund, Selm Stenvall, John Westbergh, Carl Pahlin)	2:09:43
Bronze	Italy (Aristide Compagnoni, Severino Compagnoni, Goffredo Baur, Alberto Jammaron)	2:13:38

== Men's Nordic combined ==
=== Individual ===
February 11, 1939

Medal	Athlete	Points
Gold	Gustav 'Gustl' Berauer (GER)	429.6
Silver	Gustaf Adolf Sellin (SWE)	426.6
Bronze	Magnar Fosseide (NOR)	422.4

Berauer was from Czechoslovakia, but competed for Germany after the Nazis occupied Czechoslovakia in 1938.

== Men's ski jumping ==
=== Individual large hill ===
February 11, 1939

Medal	Athlete	Points
Gold	Josef 'Sepp' Bradl (GER)	224.7
Silver	Birger Ruud (NOR)	224.2
Bronze	Arnholdt Kongsgaard (NOR)	223.1

Bradl was from Austria, but competed for Germany after the Nazis occupied Austria in 1938.

== Medal table ==
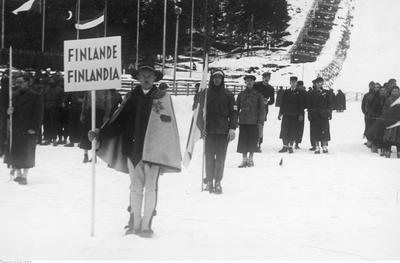
Team Finland in open ceremony

Rank	Nation	Gold	Silver	Bronze	Total
1	Finland (FIN)	2	2	0	4
2	Germany (GER)	2	0	0	2
3	Norway (NOR)	1	1	3	5
4	Sweden (SWE)	0	2	1	3
5	Italy (ITA)	0	0	1	1
Totals (5 entries)		5	5	5	15
