= Asbjørn Ruud =

Norwegian ski jumper (1919–1989)

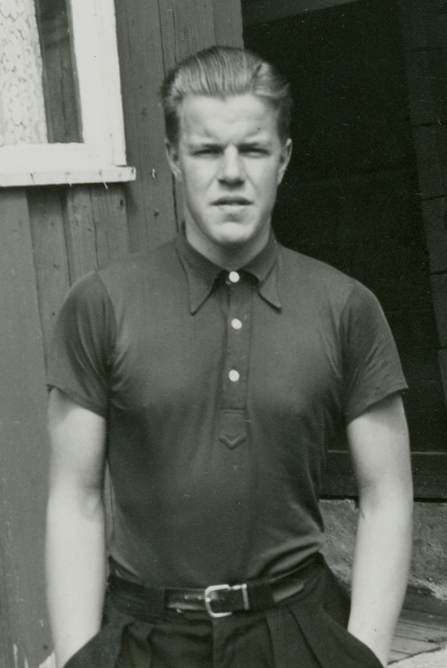

Personal information
- Born: 6 October 1919 Kongsberg, Norway
- Died: 26 March 1989 (aged 69) Oslo, Norway

Sport
- Sport: Ski jumping
- Club: Kongsberg IF
Medal record
Men's ski jumping
Representing Norway
World Championships
Gold medal – first place	1938 Lahti	Individual large hill

Asbjørn Ruud (6 October 1919 – 26 March 1989) was a Norwegian ski jumper. He dominated the international ski jumping scene in the 1930s with his brothers Birger and Sigmund. Ruud won a gold medal at the 1938 FIS Nordic World Ski Championships. Eight years later, he won the ski jumping competition at the Holmenkollen ski festival, the first held since the German occupation of Norway in 1940 during World War II. Ruud finished seventh in the individual large hill competition at the 1948 Winter Olympics in St. Moritz. He won the Holmenkollen medal for ski jumping in 1948, becoming the second of the three brothers to do so.
