= FIS Nordic World Ski Championships 1938 =

International Nordic skiing competition

- Official poster for the FIS Nordic World Ski Championships 1938. (in Finnish)
- Host city: Lahti
- Country: Finland
- Events: 5
- Opening: 24 February 1938
- Closing: 28 February 1938

The FIS Nordic World Ski Championships 1938 took place February 24–28, 1938 in Lahti, Finland. This was the Finnish city's second time hosting the championships after having done so in 1926.

== Men's cross country ==
=== 18 km ===
February 25, 1938

Medal	Athlete	Time
Gold	Pauli Pitkänen (FIN)	1:09:37
Silver	Alfred Dahlqvist (SWE)	1:10:02
Bronze	Kalle Jalkanen (FIN)	1:10:56

187 of 188 skiers completed the event.

=== 50 km ===
February 27, 1938

Medal	Athlete	Time
Gold	Kalle Jalkanen (FIN)	4:06:09
Silver	Alvar Rantalahti (FIN)	4:10:44
Bronze	Lars Bergendahl (NOR)	4:10:54

62 of the 99 skiers completed the event.

=== 4 × 10 km relay ===
February 28, 1938

Medal	Team	Time
Gold	Finland (Juho 'Jussi' Kurikkala, Martti Lauronen, Pauli Pitkänen, Klaes Karppinen)	2:38:42
Silver	Norway (Ragnar Ringstad, Olav Økern, Arne Larsen, Lars Bergendahl)	2:42:30
Bronze	Sweden (Sven Hansson, Donald Johansson, Sigurd Nilsson, Martin Matsbo)	2:43:05

== Men's Nordic combined ==
=== Individual ===
February 24, 1938

Medal	Athlete	Points
Gold	Olaf Hoffsbakken (NOR)	432.60
Silver	John Westbergh (SWE)	412.80
Bronze	Hans Vinjarengen (NOR)	411.20

== Men's ski jumping ==
=== Individual large hill ===
February 27, 1938

Medal	Athlete	Points
Gold	Asbjørn Ruud (NOR)	226.4
Silver	Stanisław Marusarz (POL)	226.2
Bronze	Hilmar Myhra (NOR)	225.0

== Medal table ==
Rank	Nation	Gold	Silver	Bronze	Total
1	Finland (FIN)	3	1	1	5
2	Norway (NOR)	2	1	3	6
3	Sweden (SWE)	0	2	1	3
4	Poland (POL)	0	1	0	1
Totals (4 entries)		5	5	5	15
