= FIS Nordic World Ski Championships =

International Nordic skiing competitions

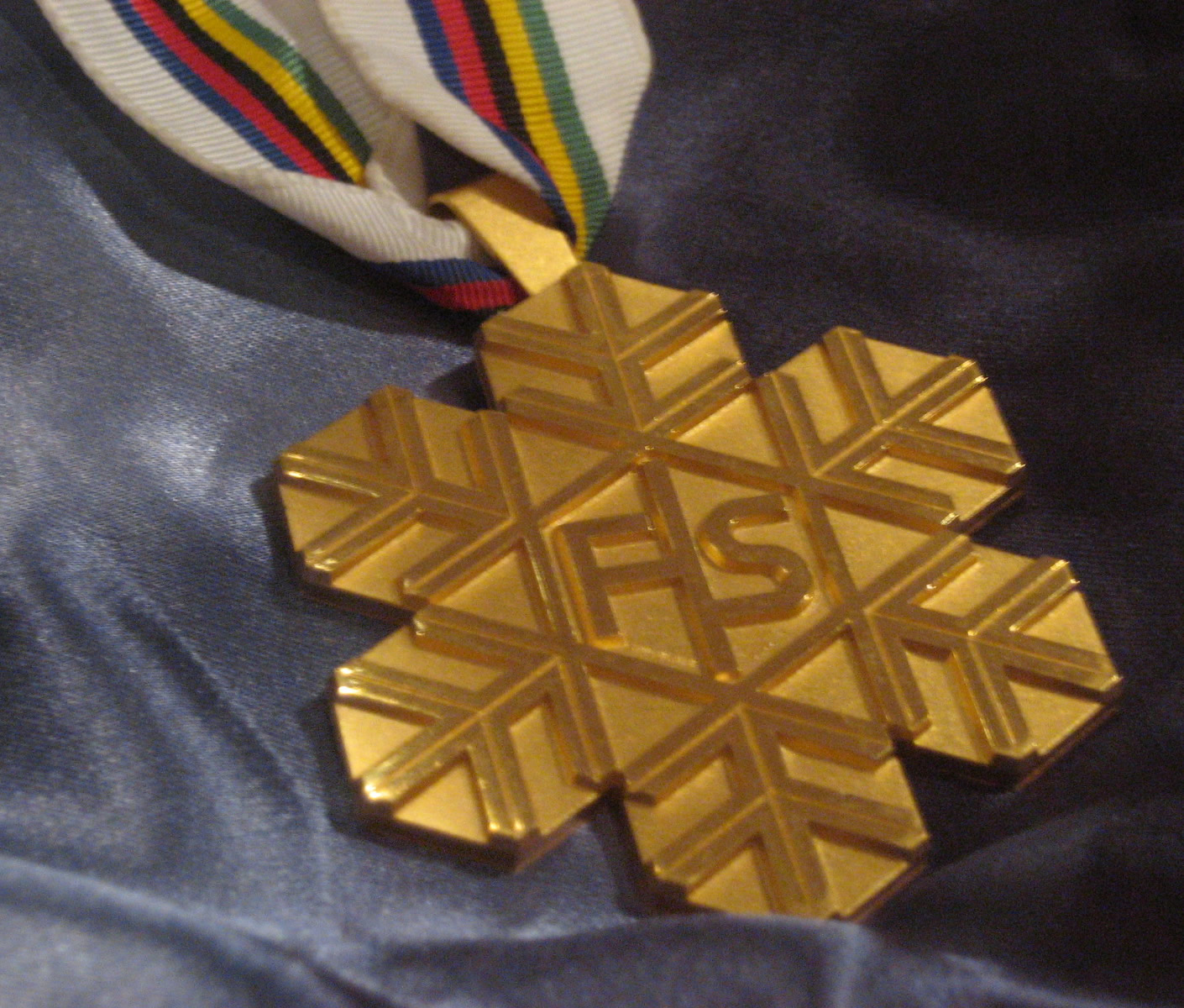
- Gold medal
- Status: active
- Genre: sporting event
- Date: February–March
- Frequency: biennial (since 1985)
- Location: various
- Inaugurated: 1924
- Organiser: FIS

The FIS Nordic World Ski Championships is a biennial Nordic skiing event organized by the International Ski Federation (FIS). The World Championships was started in 1924 for men and opened for women's participation in 1954. World Championship events include Nordic skiing's three disciplines: cross-country skiing, ski jumping, and Nordic combined (the latter being a combination sport consisting of both cross-country and ski jumping). The Winter Olympics from 1924 to 1980 were also the Nordic World Ski Championships. This meant that the Olympic champions were also World champions and received an additional medal from the International Ski Federation (FIS). Since 1985, the World Championships have been held in odd-numbered years.

== History ==
The first Nordic Skiing World Championships were held in Chamonix in 1924, as part of the first Winter Olympics, which were only later recognized as such. The competitions took place annually until 1939. From 1925 to 1927, the FIS referred to the events as Rendezvous races, while in the years after that until 1935 they were held as FIS races. Since 1937, the competitions have had the official title of FIS Nordic World Ski Championships. Until the 1980 Winter Olympics, the Olympic champions were also World champions.

The 1940 Nordic World Ski Championships were canceled due to the war, but this was also criticized at the time. The Italian winter sports resort of Cortina d'Ampezzo organized the 1941 Nordic World Ski Championships. However, the FIS subsequently declared these invalid at a congress in Pau in 1946, so that the medals awarded lost their official status and were no longer counted.

With the 1984 Winter Olympics, the rule that the Olympic winners were also World champions was finally abandoned. Since 1985, the Nordic World Ski Championships have taken place in odd-numbered years, independently of the Winter Olympics, in order to avoid an overlap with the Olympics.

The 1980 and 1984 World Championships consisted of a total of only three events; women's 20 km cross-country (1980), ski-jumping team event and Nordic combined team event (both 1984). These events were not held in the 1980 Winter Olympics and 1984 Winter Olympics and therefore got their own World Championships.

=== Historical notes ===
The following list shows when new events were added for the first time:

- 1933, men's relay (cross-country) was added.
- 1954, women's 10 km and 3 × 5 km relay was added, men's 15 km (cross-country) replaced the 18 km.
- 1962, men's normal hill (ski jumping) and women's 5 km (cross-country) were added.
- 1978, women's 20 km (cross-country) was added.
- 1982, men's ski jumping team large hill and Nordic combined team large hill were added.
- 1989, women's 15 km was added (cross-country) and women's 30 km replaced the 20 km.
- 1991, men's 10 km (cross-country) was added.
- 1993, cross-country pursuit (both genders) were added.
- 2001, men's ski jumping team normal hill was added and cross-country sprint (both genders) replaced the 10 km (men) and the 5 km (women).
- 2003, the Skiathlon format was introduced for pursuit races (previously separate races on the same day).
- 2005, women's 30 km and men's 50 km (cross-country) changed from interval start to mass start. Additionally, cross-country team sprint (both genders) were added.
- 2009, women's normal hill (ski jumping) was added.
- 2011, Nordic combined team normal hill was added.
- 2013, mixed team (ski jumping) was added and team sprint large hill (Nordic combined) replaced the team large hill.
- 2019, women's team normal hill (ski jumping) was added.
- 2021, women's Nordic combined with women's large hill (ski jumping) were added.
- 2023, Nordic combined mixed team event replaced men's team sprint large hill.
- 2025, men's 10 km replaced the 15 km (interval start, cross-country), women's 50 km replaced the 30 km (mass-start, cross-country), men's and women's 4x7,5 km replaced the men's 4x10 km and the women's 4x5 km (relay, cross-country), men's and women's 20 km replaced the men's 30 km and the women's 15 km (skiathlon, cross-country), men's compact 7,5 km replaced the Gundersen 10 km (normal hill, Nordic combined), women's mass-start 5 km + normal hill (Nordic combined) and men's and women's Para Sprint (separated from Para Cross-Country World Championships) were added.

== Editions ==
#	Year	Location	Date	Venue	Host country	Top nation	Events	Notes
—	1924	Chamonix	25 Jan – 2 Feb	Stade Olympique de Chamonix / Tremplin Olympique du Mont	France	Norway	4	Declared the first Winter Olympic Games in 1926. Declared the first Nordic World Ski Championships in 1965.
1	1925	Janské Lázně	4–14 Feb	—	Czechoslovakia	Czechoslovakia	4	Denoted Rendezvous races
2	1926	Lahti	4–6 Feb	Salpausselkä	Finland	Norway	4	Denoted Rendezvous races
3	1927	Cortina d'Ampezzo	2–5 Feb	Trampolino Olimpico	Italy	Sweden	4	Denoted FIS races
—	1928	St. Moritz	11–17 Feb	Olympic Stadium / Olympiaschanze	Switzerland	Norway	4	Winter Olympic Games
4	1929	Zakopane	5–9 Feb	—	Poland	Finland	4	Denoted FIS races
5	1930	Oslo	27 Feb – 1 Mar	Holmenkollen	Norway	Norway	4	
6	1931	Oberhof	13–15 Feb	—	Germany	Norway	4	
—	1932	Lake Placid	10–13 Feb	James B. Sheffield Olympic Skating Rink / Lake Placid Olympic Ski Jumping Complex	United States	Norway	4	Winter Olympic Games
7	1933	Innsbruck	8–12 Feb		Austria	Sweden	5	Denoted FIS races. First with cross-country relay
8	1934	Sollefteå	20–25 Feb	Hallstaberget	Sweden	Norway	5	Denoted FIS races
9	1935	Vysoké Tatry	13–18 Feb		Czechoslovakia (2)	Norway	5	Denoted FIS races
—	1936	Garmisch-Partenkirchen	6–15 Feb	Olympic Stadium / Große Olympiaschanze	Germany	Norway	5	Winter Olympic Games
10	1937	Chamonix	12–28 Feb	Tremplin Olympique / Stade Olympique	France	Norway	5	First official FIS Nordic World Ski Championships
11	1938	Lahti (2)	24–28 Feb	Salpausselkä	Finland (2)	Finland	5	
12	1939	Zakopane (2)	11–19 Feb	—	Poland (2)	Finland	5	
—	1941	Cortina d'Ampezzo	1–10 Feb	Trampolino Olimpico	Italy	Finland	5	Declared unofficial in 1946
—	1948	St. Moritz	31 Jan – 7 Feb	Olympic Stadium / Olympiaschanze	Switzerland	Sweden	5	Winter Olympic Games
13	1950	Lake Placid (SJ); Rumford (XC)	1–6 Feb	Intervales —	United States	Sweden	5	First championship outside Europe
—	1952	Oslo	17–24 Feb	Holmenkollbakken	Norway	Finland	6	Winter Olympic Games
14	1954	Falun	13–21 Feb	Lugnet	Sweden (2)	Soviet Union	8	First championship with women
—	1956	Cortina d'Ampezzo	27 Jan – 5 Feb	Stadio della neve / Trampolino Olimpico	Italy	Finland	8	Winter Olympic Games
15	1958	Lahti (3)	1–9 Mar	Salpausselkä	Finland (3)	Finland	8	
—	1960	Squaw Valley	19–27 Feb	McKinney Creek Stadium / Papoose Peak Jumps	United States	Finland	8	Winter Olympic Games
16	1962	Zakopane (3)	18–25 Feb	—	Poland (3)	Soviet Union	10	First with normal hill
—	1964	Innsbruck; Seefeld in Tirol	18–28 Feb	Bergiselschanze / Toni-Seelos-Olympiaschanze / Olympiaregion Seefeld	Austria	Finland	10	Winter Olympic Games
17	1966	Oslo (2)	17–27 Feb	Holmenkollen	Norway (2)	Norway	10	
—	1968	Grenoble	7–18 Feb	Dauphine / Le Claret / Austrans	France	Norway	10	Winter Olympic Games
18	1970	Vysoké Tatry (2)	14–22 Feb	Štrbské pleso	Czechoslovakia (3)	Soviet Union	10	
—	1972	Sapporo	5–13 Feb	—	Japan	Soviet Union	10	Winter Olympic Games
19	1974	Falun (2)	16–24 Feb	Lugnet	Sweden (3)	East Germany	10	
—	1976	Innsbruck; Seefeld in Tirol	7–15 Feb	Bergiselschanze / Toni-Seelos-Olympiaschanze / Olympiaregion Seefeld	Austria	Soviet Union	10	Winter Olympic Games
20	1978	Lahti (4)	18–26 Feb	Salpausselkä	Finland (4)	Soviet Union	11	
—	1980	Lake Placid	14–23 Feb	Lake Placid Olympic Ski Jumping Complex / Olympic Sports Complex	United States	Soviet Union	10	Winter Olympic Games. Last Winter Olympics, which were also considered the Nordic World Ski Championships
21	1980	Falun (3)	8 Mar	Lugnet	Sweden (4)	East Germany	1	Non-Olympic event
22	1982	Oslo (3)	19–28 Feb	Holmenkollen	Norway (3)	Norway	13	First with team large hill/Nordic combined relay
23	1984	Engelberg (SJ); Rovaniemi (NC)	26 Feb; 17 Mar	Gross-Titlis-Schanze –	Switzerland; Finland (5)	Finland	2	Non-Olympic events
24	1985	Seefeld	16–27 Jan	Seefeld Nordic Competence Centre / Bergiselschanze in Innsbruck	Austria (2)	Norway	13	
25	1987	Oberstdorf	12–21 Feb	Schattenberg Ski Jump / Birgsautal	West Germany	Sweden	13	
26	1989	Lahti (5)	17–26 Feb	Salpausselkä / Lahti Stadium	Finland (6)	Finland	15	
27	1991	Val di Fiemme	7–17 Feb	Lago di Tesero / Trampolino dal Ben	Italy (2)	Norway	15	First with 10 km cross-country (men)
28	1993	Falun (4)	19–28 Feb	Lugnet	Sweden (5)	Norway	15	First with pursuit
29	1995	Thunder Bay	9–19 Mar	Big Thunder	Canada	Russia	15	
30	1997	Trondheim	21 Feb – 2 Mar	Granåsen Ski Centre	Norway (4)	Russia	15	
31	1999	Ramsau	19–28 Feb	Ramsau am Dachstein / Paul-Ausserleitner-Schanze in Bischofshofen	Austria (3)	Norway	16	First with 10 km/large hill
32	2001	Lahti (6)	15–25 Feb	Salpausselkä / Lahti Stadium	Finland (7)	Norway	19	First with team normal hill; first with sprint
33	2003	Val di Fiemme (2)	18 Feb – 1 Mar	Lago di Tesero / Trampolino dal Ben	Italy (3)	Norway	18	
34	2005	Oberstdorf (2)	16–27 Feb	Schattenberg Ski Jump / Ried	Germany (2)	Norway	19	First with team sprint
35	2007	Sapporo	22 Feb – 4 Mar	Miyanomori / Okurayama / Shirahatayama / Sapporo Dome	Japan	Norway	18	
36	2009	Liberec	18 Feb – 1 Mar	Ještěd / Vesec	Czech Republic	Norway	20	First with ski jumping for women; only with Nordic combined mass start
37	2011	Oslo (4)	23 Feb – 6 Mar	Holmenkollen	Norway (5)	Norway	21	First with Nordic combined normal hill relay
38	2013	Val di Fiemme (3)	20 Feb – 3 Mar	Lago di Tesero / Trampolino dal Ben	Italy (4)	Norway	21	First with mixed team ski jumping First with Nordic combined large hill team sprint
39	2015	Falun (5)	18 Feb – 1 Mar	Lugnet	Sweden (6)	Norway	21	
40	2017	Lahti (7)	22 Feb – 5 Mar	Salpausselkä / Lahti Stadium	Finland (8)	Norway	21	
41	2019	Seefeld (2)	20 Feb – 3 Mar	Seefeld Nordic Competence Centre / Bergiselschanze in Innsbruck	Austria (4)	Norway	22	First with women's team ski jumping
42	2021	Oberstdorf (3)	24 Feb – 7 Mar	Schattenberg Ski Jump / Ried	Germany (3)	Norway	24	First with women's Nordic combined individual race First with women's ski jumping large hill
43	2023	Planica	22 Feb – 5 Mar	Planica Nordic Centre	Slovenia	Norway	24	First with Nordic combined mixed team event
44	2025	Trondheim (2)	26 Feb – 9 Mar	Granåsen Ski Centre	Norway (6)	Norway	25+6	First with women's mass-start 5 km + normal hill (Nordic combined), men's and women's para sprint events
45	2027	Falun (6)	24 Feb – 7 Mar	Lugnet	Sweden (7)			
46	2029	Lahti (8)		Salpausselkä / Lahti Stadium	Finland (9)			
47	2031	Oberstdorf (4)		Schattenberg Ski Jump / Ried	Germany (4)			

== Medalists by sport ==
- Cross-country skiing
  - List of FIS Nordic World Ski Championships medalists in men's cross-country skiing
  - List of FIS Nordic World Ski Championships medalists in women's cross-country skiing
- Nordic combined
  - List of FIS Nordic World Ski Championships medalists in Nordic combined
- Ski jumping
  - List of FIS Nordic World Ski Championships medalists in ski jumping

== Medal table ==
Table updated after the 2025 Championships.
The medals won at the 13 Winter Olympics (from 1924 through 1980) are not included into this table.
The medals won at the para cross-country events (in 2025) are also not included.

Rank	Nation	Gold	Silver	Bronze	Total
1	Norway	184	141	132	457
2	Finland	63	74	70	207
3	Sweden	58	53	58	169
4	Germany	39	53	33	125
5	Soviet Union	36	32	24	92
6	Austria	28	33	42	103
7	Russia	26	32	31	89
8	East Germany	12	15	11	38
9	Poland	12	7	13	32
10	Italy	11	24	24	59
11	Japan	11	14	21	46
12	Slovenia	8	5	9	22
13	United States	8	5	7	20
14	Czechoslovakia	7	12	11	30
15	France	6	4	15	25
16	Switzerland	4	7	10	21
17	West Germany	4	1	2	7
18	Czech Republic	3	6	6	15
19	Estonia	3	5	2	10
20	Kazakhstan	3	2	4	9
21	Canada	3	1	3	7
22	(Russia) Russian Ski Federation	1	3	1	5
23	Spain	1	1	0	2
24	Yugoslavia	1	0	0	1
25	Belarus	0	1	0	1
25	Slovakia	0	1	0	1
27	Ukraine	0	0	2	2
Totals (27 entries)		532	532	531	1,595

== Multiple medalists ==
Boldface denotes active athletes and highest medal count among all athletes (including these who not included in these tables) per type.

=== All events ===
Rank	Athlete	Country	Gender	Discipline	From	To	Gold	Silver	Bronze	Total
1	Marit Bjørgen	Norway	F	Cross-country skiing	2003	2017	**18**	5	3	**26**
2	**Johannes Høsflot Klæbo**	Norway	M	Cross-country skiing	2017	2025	15	2	1	18
3	Therese Johaug	Norway	F	Cross-country skiing	2007	2025	14	5	4	23
4	Yelena Välbe	Soviet Union; Russia	F	Cross-country skiing	1989	1997	14	3	–	17
5	Petter Northug	Norway	M	Cross-country skiing	2007	2015	13	3	–	16
6	Larisa Lazutina (Ptitsyna)	Soviet Union; Russia	F	Cross-country skiing	1987	2001	11	3	2	16
7	Jarl Magnus Riiber	Norway	M	Nordic combined	2019	2025	11	3	1	15
8	Bjørn Dæhlie	Norway	M	Cross-country skiing	1991	1999	9	5	3	17
9	Thomas Morgenstern	Austria	M	Ski jumping	2005	2013	8	2	1	11
10	Eric Frenzel	Germany	M	Nordic combined	2011	2023	7	**8**	3	18

=== Individual events ===
==== Men ====
Rank	Athlete	Country	Discipline	From	To	Gold	Silver	Bronze	Total
1	**Johannes Høsflot Klæbo**	Norway	Cross-country skiing	2017	2025	**7**	2	1	10
2	Petter Northug	Norway	Cross-country skiing	2009	2015	**7**	2	–	9
3	Jarl Magnus Riiber	Norway	Nordic combined	2019	2025	6	1	–	7
4	Bjørn Dæhlie	Norway	Cross-country skiing	1991	1999	5	**4**	3	**12**
5	Gunde Svan	Sweden	Cross-country skiing	1985	1991	5	2	–	7
6	Vladimir Smirnov	Soviet Union; Kazakhstan	Cross-country skiing	1989	1995	4	3	3	10
7	Mika Myllylä	Finland	Cross-country skiing	1995	1999	4	2	2	8
8	Ronny Ackermann	Germany	Nordic combined	2001	2007	4	1	1	6
8	Adam Małysz	Poland	Ski jumping	2001	2011	4	1	1	6
10	Eric Frenzel	Germany	Nordic combined	2011	2019	3	1	1	5
10	Johannes Rydzek	Germany	Nordic combined	2011	2017	3	1	1	5

==== Women ====
Rank	Athlete	Country	Discipline	From	To	Gold	Silver	Bronze	Total
1	Marit Bjørgen	Norway	Cross-country skiing	2003	2017	**12**	4	1	**17**
2	Therese Johaug	Norway	Cross-country skiing	2007	2025	10	3	4	**17**
3	Yelena Välbe	Soviet Union; Russia	Cross-country skiing	1989	1997	10	2	–	12
4	Larisa Lazutina (Ptitsyna)	Soviet Union; Russia	Cross-country skiing	1987	2001	5	3	2	10
5	Bente Skari (Martinsen)	Norway	Cross-country skiing	1999	2003	5	–	–	5
6	Stefania Belmondo	Italy	Cross-country skiing	1991	1999	4	4	1	9
7	Alevtina Kolchina	Soviet Union	Cross-country skiing	1958	1966	4	1	–	5
8	**Ebba Andersson**	Sweden	Cross-country skiing	2021	2025	4	–	3	7
9	Galina Kulakova	Soviet Union	Cross-country skiing	1970	1980	3	1	1	5
10	**Gyda Westvold Hansen**	Norway	Nordic combined	2021	2025	3	1	–	4

== TV broadcasters ==
Eurosport (75 countries)
Match TV (Russia)
ORF (Austria)
Eesti Media (Estonia)
YLE (Finland)
ARD/ZDF (Germany)
NRK (Norway)
Viaplay/TV6 (Sweden)
SRG/SSR (Switzerland)
RUV (Iceland)
NBC (USA)
TVP (Poland)
Rai Sport (Italia)
L'equipe (France)
CBC (Canada)
CT Sport (Czech Republic)
JOJ Sport (Slovakia)
RTV Slovenija (Slovenia)

== See also ==
- Cross-country skiing at the Winter Olympics
- FIS Cross-Country World Cup – International cross-country skiing competition
- FIS Nordic Combined World Cup – Cross-country skiing and ski jumping competition
- FIS Nordic Junior World Ski Championships – Nordic skiing event for youths
- FIS Ski Jumping World Cup – Series of ski jumping competitions
- Nordic combined at the Winter Olympics
- Polish medalists of the FIS Nordic World Ski Championships
- Ski jumping at the Winter Olympics
- World Para Nordic Skiing Championships – International Nordic skiing competitions
