= 2007–08 FIS Ski Jumping Continental Cup =

Ski-jumping competition series

FIS Ski Jumping Continental Cup 2007/08
Discipline	Men	Women
Summer	(Austria) Bastian Kaltenböck	—
Winter	(Austria) Stefan Thurnbichler	(Norway) Anette Sagen

Competition
Edition	6th (Summer), 17th (Winter)	— (Summer), 4th (Winter)
Locations	5 (Summer), 14 (Winter)	— (Summer), 12 (Winter)
Individual	9 (Summer), 28 (Winter)	— (Summer), 17 (Winter)
Cancelled	— (Summer), 5 (Winter)	— (Summer), 9 (Winter)
Rescheduled	— (Summer), 7 (Winter)	— (Summer), 2 (Winter)

The 2007/08 FIS Ski Jumping Continental Cup was the 17th in a row (15th official) Continental Cup winter season and the 6th official summer season in ski jumping for men.

Beside overall, Anette Sagen won 10th FIS Ladies Grand Prix and the 1st German-Austrian Four Hills Ladies Tournament to D. Iraschko.

This was also the fourth season for women as both summer and winter events counted as one whole season.

Other competitive circuits in season were World Cup and Grand Prix.

== Men's Summer ==
Individual men's events in the CC history

Total	F	L	N	Winners
58	—	20	38

after normal hill event in Villach (16 September 2007)

=== Calendar ===
All	No.	Date	Place (Hill)	Size	Winner	Second	Third	Overall leader	R.
50	1	6 July 2007	(Slovenia) Velenje (Grajski grič HS94)	N _{034}	(Austria) Bastian Kaltenböck	(Slovenia) Primož Pikl	(Czech Republic) Martin Cikl (Japan) Shōhei Tochimoto	(Austria) Bastian Kaltenböck	
51	2	7 July 2007	(Slovenia) Velenje (Grajski grič HS94)	N _{035}	(Slovenia) Primož Pikl	(Japan) Keita Umezaki	(Sweden) Andreas Arén	(Slovenia) Primož Pikl	
52	3	8 July 2007	(Slovenia) Kranj (Bauhenk HS109)	N _{036}	(Slovenia) Primož Pikl	(Japan) Keita Umezaki	(Austria) Bastian Kaltenböck	(Slovenia) Primož Pikl	
53	4	4 August 2007	(Germany) Oberstdorf (Schattenbergschanze HS137)	L _{017}	(Germany) Georg Späth	(Austria) Bastian Kaltenböck	(Austria) Stefan Thurnbichler	(Slovenia) Primož Pikl	
54	5	5 August 2007	(Germany) Oberstdorf (Schattenbergschanze HS137)	L _{018}	(Austria) Bastian Kaltenböck	(Germany) Georg Späth	(Japan) Shōhei Tochimoto	(Austria) Bastian Kaltenböck	
55	6	18 August 2007	(Norway) Lillehammer (Lysgårdsbakken HS138)	L _{019}				(Austria) Bastian Kaltenböck	
56	7	19 August 2007	(Norway) Lillehammer (Lysgårdsbakken HS138)	L _{020}	(Austria) Andreas Widhölzl	(Poland) Rafał Śliż	(Germany) Tobias Bogner	(Austria) Bastian Kaltenböck	
57	8	15 September 2007	(Austria) Villach (Villacher Alpenarena HS100)	N _{037}	(Slovenia) Primož Pikl	(Czech Republic) Martin Cikl (Austria) Stefan Thurnbichler		(Austria) Bastian Kaltenböck	
58	9	16 September 2007	(Austria) Villach (Villacher Alpenarena HS100)	N _{038}	(Austria) Stefan Thurnbichler	(Norway) Jon Aaraas	(Poland) Marcin Bachleda	(Austria) Bastian Kaltenböck	
6th FIS Summer Continental Cup Men's Overall (6 July – 16 September 2007)					(Austria) Bastian Kaltenböck	(Austria) Stefan Thurnbichler	(Slovenia) Primož Pikl	Summer Overall	

==== Overall ====
Rank	after 9 events	Points
1	(Austria) Bastian Kaltenböck	452
2	(Austria) Stefan Thurnbichler	411
3	(Slovenia) Primož Pikl	380
4	(Austria) Andreas Widhölzl	304
5	(Japan) Keita Umezakil	303
6	(Czech Republic) Martin Cikl	262
7	(Germany) Georg Späth	180
8	(Poland) Marcin Bachleda	165
9	(Austria) Martin Höllwarth	159
10	(Czech Republic) Jan Matura	156

== Men's Winter ==
Individual men's events in the CC history

Total	F	L	N	Winners
606	4	254	348

after normal hill event in Vikersund (11 March 2008)

=== Calendar ===
All	No.	Date	Place (Hill)	Size	Winner	Second	Third	Overall leader	R.
579	1	1 December 2007	(Italy) Pragelato (Stadio del Trampolino HS140)	L _{239}	(Austria) Manuel Fettner	(Czech Republic) Jakub Janda	(Austria) Roland Müller	(Austria) Manuel Fettner	
580	2	2 December 2007	(Italy) Pragelato (Stadio del Trampolino HS140)	L _{240}	(Austria) T. Thurnbichler	(Czech Republic) Jakub Janda	(Italy) Andrea Morassi	(Czech Republic) Jakub Janda	
581	3	(Note: Cancelled men's event from Lahti (15 December) was rescheduled to Rovaniemi (11 December).)11 December 2007	(Finland) Rovaniemi (Ounasvaara HS100)	N _{337}	(Austria) Mario Innauer	(Austria) Roland Müller	(Czech Republic) Jan Matura	(Austria) Manuel Fettner	
582	4	12 December 2007	(Finland) Rovaniemi (Ounasvaara HS100)	N _{338}	(Austria) Roland Müller	(Austria) Manuel Fettner	(Norway) Andreas Vilberg	(Austria) Roland Müller	
583	5	13 December 2007	(Finland) Rovaniemi (Ounasvaara HS100)	N _{339}	(Austria) Manuel Fettner	(Norway) Andreas Vilberg (Slovenia) Mitja Mežnar (Finland) Sami Niemi		(Austria) Manuel Fettner	
		15 December 2007	(Finland) Lahti (Salpausselkä HS130)	L _{cnx}	cancelled due to high temperatures and lack of snow (rescheduled to Rovaniemi on 11 December)			—	
		16 December 2007	(Finland) Lahti (Salpausselkä HS130)	L _{cnx}	cancelled due to high temperatures and lack of snow			—	
584	6	21 December 2007	(Germany) Garmisch-Pa (Gr. Olympiaschanze HS140)	L _{241}	(Germany) Martin Schmitt	(Austria) Balthasar Schneider	(Austria) Stefan Thurnbichler	(Austria) Manuel Fettner	
585	7	22 December 2007	(Germany) Garmisch-Pa (Gr. Olympiaschanze HS140)	L _{242}	(Norway) Andreas Vilberg	(Austria) Martin Höllwarth	(Austria) Stefan Kaiser	(Austria) Roland Müller	
586	8	27 December 2007	(Switzerland) Engelberg (Gross-Titlis-Schanze HS137)	L _{243}	(Czech Republic) Jakub Janda	(Austria) Bastian Kaltenböck	(Norway) Jon Aaraas	(Austria) Roland Müller	
587	9	28 December 2007	(Switzerland) Engelberg (Gross-Titlis-Schanze HS137)	L _{244}	(Czech Republic) Jakub Janda	(Austria) Stefan Kaiser	(Norway) K. R. Elverum Sorsell	(Czech Republic) Jakub Janda	
588	10	5 January 2008	(Slovenia) Kranj (Bauhenk HS109)	N _{340}	(Czech Republic) Antonín Hájek	(Norway) Jon Aaraas	(Slovenia) Jure Bogataj	(Czech Republic) Jakub Janda	
589	11	6 January 2008	(Slovenia) Kranj (Bauhenk HS109)	N _{341}	(Austria) Bastian Kaltenböck	(Norway) K. R. Elverum Sorsell	(Czech Republic) Antonín Hájek	(Czech Republic) Jakub Janda	
590	12	11 January 2008	(Japan) Sapporo (Miyanomori HS100) (Ōkurayama HS134)	N _{342}	(Germany) Stephan Hocke	(Japan) Yūta Watase	(Austria) Bastian Kaltenböck	(Czech Republic) Jakub Janda	
591	13	12 January 2008	(Japan) Sapporo (Miyanomori HS100) (Ōkurayama HS134)	L _{245}	(Slovenia) Jure Šinkovec	(Austria) Stefan Thurnbichler	(Japan) Yukio Sakano	(Czech Republic) Jakub Janda	
592	14	13 January 2008	(Japan) Sapporo (Miyanomori HS100) (Ōkurayama HS134)	L _{246}	(Austria) Bastian Kaltenböck	(Norway) O. M. Ingvaldsen	(Austria) S. Thurnbichler	(Austria) S. Thurnbichler	
593	15	19 January 2008	(Germany) Brotterode (Inselbergschanze HS117)	L _{247}	(Austria) Martin Höllwarth	(Austria) Mario Innauer	(Czech Republic) Ondřej Vaculík	(Austria) S. Thurnbichler	
		20 January 2008	(Germany) Brotterode (Inselbergschanze HS117)	L _{cnx}	cancelled due to bad weather conditions			—	
		25 January 2008	(Czech Republic) Liberec (Ještěd A HS134)	L _{cnx}	cancelled due to high temperatures and lack of snow			—	
		26 January 2008	(Czech Republic) Liberec (Ještěd A HS134)	L _{cnx}	cancelled due to high temperatures and lack of snow			—	
594	16	2 February 2008	(Poland) Zakopane (Wielka Krokiew HS134)	L _{248}	(Norway) Lars Bystøl	(Norway) K. R. Elverum Sorsell	(Austria) Stefan Thurnbichler	(Austria) S. Thurnbichler	
595	17	3 February 2008	(Poland) Zakopane (Wielka Krokiew HS134)	L _{249}	(Norway) Lars Bystøl	(Slovenia) Jure Šinkovec	(Norway) K. R. Elverum Sorsell	(Austria) S. Thurnbichler	
		9 February 2008	(Germany) Braunlage (Wurmbergschanze HS100)	N _{cnx}	cancelled and rescheduled to Hinterzarten on same dates			—	
		10 February 2008	(Germany) Braunlage (Wurmbergschanze HS100)	N _{cnx}	cancelled and rescheduled to Hinterzarten on same dates			—	
596	18	(Note: Cancelled men's event from Braunlage (9 February) was rescheduled to Hinterzarten on the same day.)9 February 2008	(Germany) Hinterzarten (Rothaus-Schanze HS108)	N _{343}	(Norway) Thomas Lobben	(Austria) Thomas Thurnbichler	(Norway) K. R. Elverum Sorsell	(Austria) S. Thurnbichler	
597	19	(Note: Cancelled men's event from Braunlage (10 February) was rescheduled to Hinterzarten on the same day.)10 February 2008	(Germany) Hinterzarten (Rothaus-Schanze HS108)	N _{344}	(Norway) Lars Bystøl	(Austria) Stefan Thurnbichler	(Germany) Felix Schoft	(Austria) S. Thurnbichler	
598	20	16 February 2008	(United States) Iron Mountain (Pine Mountain HS133)	L _{250}	(Austria) Stefan Thurnbichler	(Norway) Henning Stensrud	(Norway) Andreas Vilberg	(Austria) S. Thurnbichler	
		17 February 2008	(United States) Iron Mountain (Pine Mountain HS133)	L _{cnx}	cancelled due to bad weather conditions			—	
		23 February 2008	(Austria) Bischofshofen (Paul-Ausserleitner HS140)	L _{cnx}	cancelled and rescheduled to Ramsau on same dates			—	
		24 February 2008	(Austria) Bischofshofen (Paul-Ausserleitner HS140)	L _{cnx}	cancelled and rescheduled to Ramsau on same dates			—	
599	21	(Note: Cancelled men's event from Bischofshofen (23 February) was rescheduled to Ramsau on the same day.)23 February 2008	(Austria) Ramsau (W90-Mattensprunganl. HS98)	N _{345}	(Austria) Wolfgang Loitzl	(Austria) Bastian Kaltenböck	(Austria) Manuel Fettner	(Austria) S. Thurnbichler	
600	22	(Note: Cancelled men's event from Bischofshofen (24 February) was rescheduled to Ramsau on the same day.)24 February 2008	(Austria) Ramsau (W90-Mattensprunganl. HS98)	N _{346}	(Austria) Manuel Fettner	(Austria) Wolfgang Loitzl	(Austria) Bastian Kaltenböck	(Austria) S. Thurnbichler	
601	23	1 March 2008	(Canada) Whistler (Whistler Olympic Park HS140)	L _{251}	(Austria) Bastian Kaltenböck	(Norway) Thomas Lobben	(Austria) Stefan Thurnbichler	(Austria) S. Thurnbichler	
602	24	2 March 2008	(Canada) Whistler (Whistler Olympic Park HS140)	L _{252}	(Czech Republic) Martin Cikl	(Austria) Daniel Lackner (Austria) Martin Höllwarth		(Austria) S. Thurnbichler	
603	25	8 March 2008	(Norway) Trondheim (Granåsen HS131)	L _{253}	(Austria) Bastian Kaltenböck	(Norway) Henning Stensrud	(Norway) Roar Ljøkelsøy	(Austria) S. Thurnbichler	
604	26	9 March 2008	(Norway) Trondheim (Granåsen HS131)	L _{254}	(Norway) Roar Ljøkelsøy	(Austria) Bastian Kaltenböck	(Norway) Henning Stensrud	(Austria) S. Thurnbichler	
605	27	(Note: Originally scheduled men's event from Vikersund (11 March) was rescheduled to 11 March.)10 March 2008	(Norway) Vikersund (Vikersundbakken HS100)	N _{347}	(Austria) Bastian Kaltenböck	(Norway) Lars Bystøl	(Czech Republic) Martin Cikl	(Austria) S. Thurnbichler	
606	28	(Note: Cancelled men's event from Vikersund (12 March) was rescheduled to 11 March.)11 March 2008	(Norway) Vikersund (Vikersundbakken HS100)	N _{348}	(Austria) Stefan Thurnbichler	(Austria) Bastian Kaltenböck	(Norway) Vegard Haukø Sklett	(Austria) S. Thurnbichler	
		12 March 2008	(Norway) Vikersund (Vikersundbakken HS100)	N _{cnx}	cancelled and rescheduled to Vikersund on 10 March			—	
17th FIS Winter Continental Cup Men's Overall (1 December 2007 – 11 March 2008)					(Austria) Stefan Thurnbichler	(Austria) Bastian Kaltenböck	(Norway) Lars Bystøl	Winter Overall	

==== Overall ====
Rank	after 28 events	Points
1	(Austria) Stefan Thurnbichler	1157
2	(Norway) Bastian Kaltenböck	1101
3	(Austria) Lars Bystøl	608
4	(Austria) Balthasar Schneider	580
5	(Austria) Roland Müller	579
6	(Austria) Manuel Fettner	570
7	(Austria) Martin Höllwarth	528
8	(Austria) Daniel Lackner	512
9	(Norway) K. R. Elverum Sorsell	490
10	(Austria) Stefan Kaiser	482

== Women's Individual ==
Individual women's events in the CC history

Total	L	N	M	Winners
67	1	51	15

after normal hill event in Zaō (9 March 2008)

=== Calendar ===
All	No.	Date	Place (Hill)	Size	Winner	Second	Third	Overalll leader	R.
51	1	12 August 2007	(Germany) Bischofsgrün (Ochsenkopfschanzen HS71)	M _{012}	(Germany) Jenna Mohr	(Germany) Anna Häfele	(Canada) Katie Willis	(Germany) Jenna Mohr	
52	2	15 August 2007	(Germany) Pöhla (Pöhlbachschanze HS65)	M _{013}	(Austria) J. Seifriedsberger	(Austria) Daniela Iraschko	(Germany) Jenna Mohr	(Germany) Jenna Mohr	
53	3	18 August 2007	(Austria) Bischofshofen (Laideregg-Schanze HS78)	M _{014}	(Norway) Anette Sagen	(Austria) Daniela Iraschko	(Austria) J. Seifriedsberger	N/A	
54	4	19 August 2007	(Austria) Ramsau (W90-Mattensprunganlage HS98)	N _{039}	(Austria) Daniela Iraschko	(Norway) Anette Sagen	(Japan) Izumi Yamada	(Austria) Daniela Iraschko	
1st German-Austrian Four Hills Ladies Tournament Overall (12 – 19 August 2007)					(Austria) Daniela Iraschko	(Austria) J. Seifriedsberger	(Canada) Nata De Leeuw	German-Austrian 4H	
55	5	28 August 2008	(United States) Lake Placid (MacKenzie Intervale HS100)	N _{040}	(Norway) Anette Sagen	(Austria) Daniela Iraschko	(Canada) Katie Willis	(Austria) Daniela Iraschko	
56	6	29 August 2008	(United States) Lake Placid (MacKenzie Intervale HS100)	N _{041}	(Norway) Anette Sagen	(Canada) Nata De Leeuw	(Austria) Daniela Iraschko	(Austria) Daniela Iraschko	
		1 September 2007	(United States) Park City (Utah Olympic Park HS100)	N _{cnx}	cancelled and rescheduled on the next day			—	
57	7	(Note: Cancelled women's event from Park City (1 September) was rescheduled on first event next day.)2 September 2007	(United States) Park City (Utah Olympic Park HS100)	N _{042}	(Austria) Daniela Iraschko	(Norway) Anette Sagen	(Austria) J. Seifriedsberger	N/A	
58	8	2 September 2007	(United States) Park City (Utah Olympic Park HS100)	N _{043}	(Austria) Daniela Iraschko	(Norway) Anette Sagen	(Canada) Nata De Leeuw	(Austria) Daniela Iraschko	
59	9	11 December 2007	(Norway) Notodden (Tveitanbakken HS100)	N _{044}	(Norway) Anette Sagen	(United States) Lindsey Van	(Austria) J. Seifriedsberger	N/A	
60	10	12 December 2007	(Norway) Notodden (Tveitanbakken HS100)	N _{045}	(Norway) Anette Sagen	(United States) Lindsey Van	(Austria) J. Seifriedsberger	(Norway) Anette Sagen	
		15 December 2007	(Finland) Lahti (Salpausselkä HS70)	M _{cnx}	cancelled due to high temperatures and lack of snow			—	
		16 December 2007	(Finland) Lahti (Salpausselkä HS70)	M _{cnx}	cancelled due to high temperatures and lack of snow			—	
		19 January 2008	(Slovenia) Ljubno (Savina HS95)	N _{cnx}	cancelled			—	
		20 January 2008	(Slovenia) Ljubno (Savina HS95)	N _{cnx}	cancelled			—	
61	11	23 January 2008	(Italy) Toblach (Trampolino Sulzenhof HS74)	M _{015}	(Norway) Anette Sagen	(Slovenia) Maja Vtič	(Austria) J. Seifriedsberger	(Norway) Anette Sagen	
		26 January 2008	(Austria) Wörgl (Sprungzentrum Wörgl HS90)	N _{cnx}	cancelled			—	
		2 February 2008	(Slovenia) Ljubno (Savina HS95)	N _{cnx}	cancelled due to high temperatures and lack of snow			—	
		3 February 2008	(Slovenia) Ljubno (Savina HS95)	N _{cnx}	cancelled due to high temperatures and lack of snow			—	
		14 February 2008	(Austria) Seefeld (Toni-Seelos HS100)	N _{cnx}	cancelled and rescheduled to Breitenberg on 17 February			—	
62	12	16 February 2008	(Germany) Breitenberg (Baptist-Kitzlinger-Schanze HS82)	N _{046}	(Norway) Anette Sagen	(United States) Lindsey Van	(Slovenia) Maja Vtič	(Norway) Anette Sagen	
63	13	(Note: Cancelled women's event from Seefeld (14 February) was rescheduled to Breitenberg (17 February).)17 February 2008	(Germany) Breitenberg (Baptist-Kitzlinger-Schanze HS82)	N _{047}	(Slovenia) Maja Vtič	(United States) Lindsey Van (Norway) Anette Sagen		(Norway) Anette Sagen	
64	14	20 February 2008	(Germany) Baiersbronn (Große Ruhesteinschanze HS90)	N _{048}	(Canada) Atsuko Tanaka	(Norway) Anette Sagen	(Germany) Carina Vogt	(Norway) Anette Sagen	
65	15	(Note: Women's event in Schönwald (23 February) had only one round.)23 February 2008	(Germany) Schönwald (Adlerschanzen Schönwald HS93)	N _{049}	(Norway) Anette Sagen	(Germany) Magdalena Schnurr	(Switzerland) Bigna Windmüller	(Norway) Anette Sagen	
10th FIS Ladies Grand Prix Overall (14 – 23 February 2008))					(Norway) Anette Sagen	(Slovenia) Maja Vtič	(Canada) Atsuko Tanaka	Ladies Grand Prix	
		29 February 2008	(Japan) Sapporo (Miyanomori HS98)	N _{cnx}	cancelled due to bad weather conditions			—	
		1 March 2008	(Japan) Sapporo (Miyanomori HS98)	N _{cnx}	cancelled due to bad weather conditions			—	
66	16	8 March 2008	(Japan) Zaō (Yamagata HS100)	N _{050}	(Norway) Anette Sagen	(Austria) J. Seifriedsberger	(Austria) Daniela Iraschko	(Norway) Anette Sagen	
67	17	9 March 2008	(Japan) Zaō (Yamagata HS100)	N _{051}	(Norway) Anette Sagen	(Austria) Daniela Iraschko	(United States) Jessica Jerome	(Norway) Anette Sagen	
4th FIS Continental Cup Women's Overall (12 August 2007 – 9 March 2008)					(Norway) Anette Sagen	(Austria) Daniela Iraschko	(Austria) J. Seifriedsberger	Women's Overall	

==== Overall ====
Rank	after 17 events	Points
1	(Norway) Anette Sagen	1400
2	(Austria) Daniela Iraschko	928
3	(Austria) Jacqueline Seifriedsberger	801
4	(Slovenia) Maja Vtič	607
5	(Germany) Jenna Mohr	590
6	(United States) Lindsey Van	523
7	(Canada) Nata De Leeuw	440
	(United States) Jessica Jerome	440
9	(Canada) Katie Willis	414
10	(Germany) Ulrike Gräßler	400

== Team events ==
Team events in the CC history

Total	N	M	Winners	Competition
4	2	2	3	Women's team

after women's MH team event in Breitenberg (11 February 2007)

=== Calendar ===
All	No.	Date	Place (Hill)	Size	Winner	Second	Third
Women's team
		17 February 2008	(Germany) Breitenberg (Baptist-Kitzlinger-Schanze HS82)	M _{cnx}	cancelled		

== Europa Cup vs. Continental Cup ==
- Last two Europa Cup seasons (1991/92 and 1992/93) are recognized as first two Continental Cup seasons by International Ski Federation (FIS), although Continental Cup under this name officially started first season in 1993/94 season.

== See also ==
- 2007–08 FIS Ski Jumping World Cup
- 2007 FIS Ski Jumping Grand Prix
