= 2006–07 FIS Ski Jumping Continental Cup =

Ski-jumping competition series

FIS Ski Jumping Continental Cup 2006/07
Discipline	Men	Women
Summer	(Austria) Stefan Thurnbichler	—
Winter	(Austria) Balthasar Schneider	(Norway) Anette Sagen

Competition
Edition	5th (Summer), 16th (Winter)	— (Summer), 3rd (Winter)
Locations	4 (Summer), 11 (Winter)	— (Summer), 15 (Winter)
Individual	8 (Summer), 24 (Winter)	— (Summer), 20 (Winter)
Team	— (Summer), — (Winter)	— (Summer), 1 (Winter)
Cancelled	— (Summer), 8 (Winter)	— (Summer), — (Winter)

The 2006/07 FIS Ski Jumping Continental Cup was the 16th in a row (14th official) Continental Cup winter season and the 5th official summer season in ski jumping for men.

This was also the third season for women as both summer and winter events counted as one whole season.

Beside overall, Anette Sagen won 6th FIS Ladies Summer Tournament and 8th FIS Ladies Grand Prix tournament went to Lindsey Van.

Other competitive circuits in season were World Cup and Grand Prix.

== Men's Summer ==
Individual men's events in the CC history

Total	F	L	N	Winners
49	—	16	33

after normal hill event in Lillehammer (20 August 2006)

=== Calendar ===
All	No.	Date	Place (Hill)	Size	Winner	Second	Third	Overall leader	R.
42	1	7 July 2006	(Slovenia) Velenje (Grajski grič HS94)	N _{028}	(Slovenia) Rok Benkovič	(Czech Republic) Jan Mazoch	(Slovenia) Primož Pikl	(Slovenia) Rok Benkovič	
43	2	8 July 2006	(Slovenia) Velenje (Grajski grič HS94)	N _{029}	(Czech Republic) Jan Mazoch	(Austria) Stefan Thurnbichler	(Slovenia) Primož Pikl	(Czech Republic) Jan Mazoch	
44	3	22 July 2006	(Austria) Villach (Villacher Alpenarena HS98)	N _{030}	(Austria) Wolfgang Loitzl	(Austria) Mario Innauer	(Czech Republic) Jan Mazoch	(Czech Republic) Jan Mazoch	
45	4	23 July 2006	(Austria) Villach (Villacher Alpenarena HS98)	N _{031}	(Austria) G. Schlierenzauer	(Austria) Wolfgang Loitzl	(Austria) Stefan Thurnbichler	(Czech Republic) Jan Mazoch	
46	5	29 July 2006	(Germany) Oberstdorf (Schattenberg HS137)	L _{015}	(Czech Republic) Antonín Hájek	(Germany) Martin Schmitt	(Austria) Stefan Thurnbichler	(Czech Republic) Jan Mazoch	
47	6	30 July 2006	(Germany) Oberstdorf (Schattenberg HS137)	L _{016}	(Germany) Martin Schmitt	(Czech Republic) Antonín Hájek	(Slovenia) Primož Pikl	(Austria) Stefan Thurnbichler	
48	7	19 August 2006	(Norway) Lillehammer (Lysgårdsbakken HS100)	N _{032}	(Japan) Kenshirō Itō	(Norway) Thomas Lobben	(Austria) Stefan Thurnbichler	(Austria) Stefan Thurnbichler	
49	8	20 August 2006	(Norway) Lillehammer (Lysgårdsbakken HS100)	N _{033}	(Norway) Thomas Lobben	(Japan) Kenshirō Itō	(Austria) Stefan Thurnbichler	(Austria) Stefan Thurnbichler	
5th FIS Summer Continental Cup Men's Overall (7 July – 20 August 2006)					(Austria) Stefan Thurnbichler	(Slovenia) Rok Benkovič	(Slovenia) Primož Pikl	Summer Overall	

==== Overall ====
Rank	after 8 events	Points
1	(Austria) Stefan Thurnbichler	410
2	(Slovenia) Rok Benkovič	366
3	(Slovenia) Primož Pikl	293
4	(Czech Republic) Jan Mazoch	292
5	(Norway) Thomas Lobben	251
6	(Austria) Mario Innauer	242
7	(Austria) Balthasar Schneider	211
8	(Norway) Andreas Vilberg	198
9	(Germany) Martin Schmitt	180
	(Japan) Kenshirō Itō	180
	(Austria) Wolfgang Loitzl	180
	(Czech Republic) Antonín Hájek	180

== Men's Winter ==
Individual men's events in the CC history

Total	F	L	N	Winners
578	4	238	336

after large hill event in Zakopane (18 March 2007)

=== Calendar ===
All	No.	Date	Place (Hill)	Size	Winner	Second	Third	Overall leader	R.
		2 December 2006	(Czech Republic) Harrachov (Čerťák HS142)	L _{cnx}	cancelled due to high temperatures and lack of snow			—	
		3 December 2006	(Czech Republic) Harrachov (Čerťák HS142)	L _{cnx}	cancelled due to high temperatures and lack of snow			—	
555	1	12 December 2006	(Finland) Rovaniemi (Ounasvaara HS100)	N _{326}	(Austria) Arthur Pauli	(Poland) Rafał Śliż	(Austria) Mario Innauer	(Austria) Arthur Pauli	
556	2	14 December 2006	(Finland) Rovaniemi (Ounasvaara HS100)	N _{327}	(Finland) Harri Olli	(Poland) Rafał Śliż	(Norway) Henning Stensrud	(Poland) Rafał Śliż	
		15 December 2006	(Finland) Lahti (Salpausselkä HS130)	L _{cnx}	cancelled and replaced in Rovaniemi on same dates			—	
		16 December 2006	(Finland) Lahti (Salpausselkä HS130)	L _{cnx}	cancelled and replaced in Rovaniemi on same dates			—	
557	3	(Note: Cancelled individual men's event in Lahti (15 December) was replaced in Rovaniemi on the same date.)15 December 2006	(Finland) Rovaniemi (Ounasvaara HS100)	N _{328}	(Japan) Kenshirō Itō	(Finland) Harri Olli	(Austria) Arthur Pauli	(Austria) Arthur Pauli	
558	4	(Note: Cancelled individual men's event in Lahti (16 December) was replaced in Rovaniemi on the same date.)16 December 2006	(Finland) Rovaniemi (Ounasvaara HS100)	N _{329}	(Finland) Jussi Hautamäki	(Japan) Kenshirō Itō	(Austria) Mario Innauer	(Finland) Harri Olli	
		26 December 2006	(Switzerland) St. Moritz (Olympiaschanze HS100)	N _{cnx}	cancelled due to unfavorable weather conditions			—	
559	5	27 December 2006	(Switzerland) Engelberg (Gross-Titlis-Schanze HS137)	L _{226}	(Austria) Andreas Widhölzl	(Austria) Manuel Fettner	(Austria) Mario Innauer	(Austria) Arthur Pauli	
560	6	28 December 2006	(Switzerland) Engelberg (Gross-Titlis-Schanze HS137)	L _{227}	(Norway) Morten Solem	(Austria) Mathias Hafele	(Poland) Kamil Stoch	(Austria) Mario Innauer	
561	7	6 January 2007	(Slovenia) Planica (Srednja Bloudkova HS100)	N _{330}	(Slovenia) Rok Urbanc	(Czech Republic) Ondřej Vaculík	(Norway) Morten Solem	(Austria) Mario Innauer	
562	8	7 January 2007	(Slovenia) Planica (Srednja Bloudkova HS100)	N _{331}				(Austria) Mario Innauer	
563	9	12 January 2007	(Japan) Sapporo (Miyanomori HS98) (Ōkurayama HS134)	N _{332}	(Poland) Wojciech Skupień	(Austria) Daniel Lackner	(Japan) Fumihisa Yumoto	(Norway) Morten Solem	
564	10	13 January 2007	(Japan) Sapporo (Miyanomori HS98) (Ōkurayama HS134)	L _{228}	(Austria) Bastian Kaltenböck	(Norway) Morten Solem (Czech Republic) Jan Mazoch		(Norway) Morten Solem	
565	11	14 January 2007	(Japan) Sapporo (Miyanomori HS98) (Ōkurayama HS134)	L _{229}	(Japan) Akira Higashi	(Norway) Morten Solem	(Austria) Bastian Kaltenböck	(Norway) Morten Solem	
		20 January 2007	(Germany) Braunlage (Wurmbergschanze HS100)	N _{cnx}	cancelled due to high temperatures and lack of snow			—	
		21 January 2007	(Germany) Braunlage (Wurmbergschanze HS100)	N _{cnx}	cancelled due to high temperatures and lack of snow			—	
		27 January 2007	(Austria) Bischofshofen (Paul-Ausserleitner HS140)	L _{cnx}	cancelled due to high temperatures and lack of snow			—	
		28 January 2007	(Austria) Bischofshofen (Paul-Ausserleitner HS140)	L _{cnx}	cancelled due to high temperatures and lack of snow			—	
566	12	3 February 2007	(Italy) Pragelato (Stadio del Trampolino HS140)	L _{230}	(Austria) Daniel Lackner	(Austria) Balthasar Schneider	(Italy) Andrea Morassi	(Norway) Morten Solem	
567	13	4 February 2007	(Italy) Pragelato (Stadio del Trampolino HS140)	L _{231}	(Italy) Andrea Morassi	(Sweden) Johan Erikson	(Austria) Balthasar Schneider	(Norway) Morten Solem	
568	14	10 February 2007	(United States) Westby (Snowflake HS117)	L _{232}	(Slovenia) Primož Roglič	(Sweden) Johan Erikson	(Slovenia) Robert Hrgota	(Norway) Morten Solem	
569	15	11 February 2007	(United States) Westby (Snowflake HS117)	L _{233}	(Austria) Balthasar Schneider	(Slovenia) Primož Roglič	(Germany) Erik Simon	(Norway) Morten Solem	
570	16	17 February 2007	(United States) Iron Mountain (Pine Mountain HS133)	L _{234}	(Sweden) Isak Grimholm	(Austria) Stefan Kaiser	(Austria) Balthasar Schneider	(Austria) B. Schneider	
571	17	18 February 2007	(United States) Iron Mountain (Pine Mountain HS133)	L _{235}	(Austria) Balthasar Schneider	(Sweden) Isak Grimholm	(Austria) Roland Müller	(Austria) B. Schneider	
		24 February 2006	(Germany) Brotterode (Inselbergschanze HS117)	L _{cnx}	cancelled and both replaced in Oberhof on same dates			—	
		25 February 2006	(Germany) Brotterode (Inselbergschanze HS117)	L _{cnx}	cancelled and both replaced in Oberhof on same dates			—	
572	18	(Note: Cancelled individual men's event in Brotterode (24 February) was replaced in Oberhof on the same date.)24 February 2007	(Germany) Oberhof (Hans-Renner-Schanze HS96)	N _{333}	(Germany) Julian Musiol	(Austria) Arthur Pauli	(Norway) Morten Solem (Russia) Evgeni Plekhov	(Austria) B. Schneider	
573	19	(Note: Cancelled individual men's event in Brotterode (25 February) was replaced in Oberhof on the same date.)25 February 2007	(Germany) Oberhof (Hans-Renner-Schanze HS96)	N _{334}	(Czech Republic) Lukáš Hlava	(Norway) Thomas Lobben	(Austria) Stefan Thurnbichler	(Austria) B. Schneider	
574	20	3 March 2007	(Norway) Trondheim (Granåsen HS131)	L _{236}	(Austria) Stefan Thurnbichler	(Austria) Arthur Pauli	(Norway) Morten Solem	(Austria) B. Schneider	
575	21	4 March 2007	(Norway) Trondheim (Granåsen HS131)	L _{237}	(Austria) Arthur Pauli	(Norway) Morten Solem	(Austria) Roland Müller	(Austria) B. Schneider	
576	22	10 March 2007	(Norway) Vikersund (Vikersundbakken HS100)	N _{335}				(Austria) B. Schneider	
577	23	11 March 2007	(Norway) Vikersund (Vikersundbakken HS100)	N _{336}				(Austria) B. Schneider	
		17 March 2007	(Poland) Zakopane (Wielka Krokiew HS134)	L _{cnx}	cancelled due to unfavorable weather conditions			—	
578	24	18 March 2007	(Poland) Zakopane (Wielka Krokiew HS134)	L _{238}	(Austria) Bastian Kaltenböck	(Norway) J. R. Evensen	(Germany) Erik Simon	(Austria) B. Schneider	
16th FIS Winter Continental Cup Men's Overall (12 December 2006 – 18 March 2007)					(Norway) Balthasar Schneider	(Norway) Morten Solem	(Austria) Stefan Thurnbichler	Winter Overall	

==== Overall ====
Rank	after 24 events	Points
1	(Austria) Balthasar Schneider	702
2	(Norway) Morten Solem	700
3	(Austria) Stefan Thurnbichler	689
4	(Austria) Roland Müller	585
5	(Austria) Arthur Pauli	521
6	(Austria) Bastian Kaltenböck	498
7	(Sweden) Johan Erikson	449
8	(Slovenia) Primož Roglič	444
9	(Norway) Thomas Lobben	432
10	(Austria) Daniel Lackner	425

== Women's Individual ==
Individual women's events in the CC history

Total	L	N	M	Winners
50	1	38	11

after normal hill event in Sapporo (10 March 2007)

=== Calendar ===
All	No.	Date	Place (Hill)	Size	Winner	Second	Third	R.
31	1	21 July 2006	(United States) Park City (Utah Olympic Park HS100)	N _{025}	(Germany) Juliane Seyfarth	(Austria) Daniela Iraschko	(Norway) Line Jahr	
32	2	22 July 2006	(United States) Park City (Utah Olympic Park HS100)	N _{026}	(Germany) Juliane Seyfarth	(Norway) Anette Sagen	(Austria) Daniela Iraschko	
33	3	25 July 2006	(Canada) Calgary (Alberta Ski Jump HS95)	N _{027}	(Germany) Juliane Seyfarth	(Austria) Daniela Iraschko	(Germany) Ulrike Gräßler	
34	4	26 July 2006	(Canada) Calgary (Alberta Ski Jump HS95)	N _{028}	(Germany) Juliane Seyfarth	(Austria) Daniela Iraschko	(Norway) Anette Sagen	
35	5	6 August 2006	(Germany) Klingenthal (Vogtlandschanze HS85)	N _{029}	(Norway) Anette Sagen	(Germany) Juliane Seyfarth	(United States) Jessica Jerome	
36	6	9 August 2006	(Germany) Pöhla (Pöhlbachschanze HS66)	M _{006}	(Germany) Juliane Seyfarth	(Germany) Ulrike Gräßler	(United States) Jessica Jerome	
37	7	12 August 2006	(Germany) Meinerzhagen (Meinhardus-Schanze HS68)	M _{007}	(Norway) Anette Sagen	(Germany) Juliane Seyfarth	(Japan) Ayumi Watase	
38	8	15 August 2006	(Austria) Bischofshofen (Laideregg-Schanze HS78)	M _{008}	(Norway) Anette Sagen	(Germany) Juliane Seyfarth	(Germany) Ulrike Gräßler	
6th FIS Ladies Summer Tournament Overall (6 – 15 August 2006)					(Norway) Anette Sagen	(Germany) Juliane Seyfarth	(United States) Jessica Jerome	
		13 December 2006	(Norway) Våler (Gjerdrumsbakken HS100)	N _{cnx}	cancelled due to poor weather and lack of snow across Europe			
		14 December 2006	(Norway) Våler (Gjerdrumsbakken HS100)	N _{cnx}	cancelled due to poor weather and lack of snow across Europe			
		16 December 2006	(Norway) Rena (Renabakkene HS100)	N _{cnx}	cancelled due to poor weather and lack of snow across Europe			
		17 December 2006	(Norway) Rena (Renabakkene HS100)	N _{cnx}	cancelled due to poor weather and lack of snow across Europe			
		13 January 2007	(Slovenia) Ljubno (Savina HS95)	N _{cnx}	cancelled and replaced on 6 February			
		14 January 2007	(Slovenia) Ljubno (Savina HS95)	N _{cnx}	cancelled and replaced in Toblach on 15 January			
39	9	(Note: Cancelled individual women's event in Bischofshofen (20 January) was replaced in Villach on 14 January.)14 January 2007	(Austria) Villach (Villacher Alpenarena HS98)	N _{030}	(Germany) Ulrike Gräßler	(Austria) J. Seifriedsberger	(Austria) Daniela Iraschko	
40	10	(Note: Cancelled individual women's event in Ljubno (14 January) was replaced in Toblach on 15 January.)15 January 2007	(Italy) Toblach (Trampolino Sulzenhof HS74)	M _{009}	(Norway) Anette Sagen	(Germany) Ulrike Gräßler	(Austria) Daniela Iraschko	
41	11	16 January 2007	(Italy) Toblach (Trampolino Sulzenhof HS74)	M _{010}	(Norway) Anette Sagen	(Germany) Ulrike Gräßler	(Switzerland) Bigna Windmüller	
		20 Januaryt 2006	(Austria) Bischofshofen (Laideregg-Schanze HS78)	M _{cnx}	cancelled and replaced in Villach on 20 January			
42	12	(Note: Cancelled individual women's event in Ljubno (13 January) was replaced on the same place on 6 February.)6 February 2007	(Slovenia) Ljubno (Savina HS95)	N _{031}	(Germany) Ulrike Gräßler (United States) Lindsey Van		(Norway) Anette Sagen	
43	13	8 February 2007	(Austria) Saalfelden (Bibergschanze HS95)	N _{032}	(Germany) Ulrike Gräßler	(Norway) Anette Sagen	(United States) Lindsey Van	
44	14	10 February 2007	(Germany) Breitenberg (Baptist-Kitzlinger-Schanze HS82)	M _{011}	(Norway) Anette Sagen	(Austria) Daniela Iraschko	(Canada) Katie Willis	
45	15	14 February 2007	(Germany) Baiersbronn (Große Ruhesteinschanze HS90)	N _{033}	(United States) Lindsey Van	(Germany) Lisa Rexhäuser	(Germany) Ulrike Gräßler	
46	16	17 February 2007	(Germany) Schönwald (Adlerschanzen Schönwald HS93)	N _{034}	(Canada) Katie Willis	(United States) Lindsey Van	(Austria) Daniela Iraschko	
9th FIS Ladies Grand Prix Overall (8 – 17 February 2007)					(United States) Lindsey Van	(Germany) Ulrike Gräßler	(Canada) Katie Willis	
47	17	5 March 2007	(Japan) Zaō (Yamagata HS100)	N _{035}	(Germany) Ulrike Gräßler	(United States) Lindsey Van	(Norway) Anette Sagen	
48	18	6 March 2007	(Japan) Zaō (Yamagata HS100)	N _{036}	(Germany) Ulrike Gräßler	(Austria) Daniela Iraschko	(Norway) Line Jahr	
49	19	9 March 2007	(Japan) Sapporo (Miyanomori HS100)	N _{037}	(Norway) Anette Sagen	(United States) Lindsey Van	(Germany) Ulrike Gräßler	
50	20	10 March 2007	(Japan) Sapporo (Miyanomori HS100)	N _{038}	(United States) Lindsey Van	(Norway) Anette Sagen	(Japan) Yūki Itō	
3rd FIS Continental Cup Women's Overall (21 July 2006 – 10 March 2007)					(Norway) Anette Sagen	(Germany) Ulrike Gräßler	(United States) Lindsey Van	

==== Overall ====
Rank	after 20 events	Points
1	(Norway) Anette Sagen	1340
2	(Germany) Ulrike Gräßler	1252
3	(United States) Lindsey Van	1045
4	(Austria) Daniela Iraschko	998
5	(Germany) Juliane Seyfarth	801
6	(Canada) Katie Willis	697
7	(Norway) Line Jahr	589
8	(Austria) Jacqueline Seifriedsberger	484
9	(United States) Alissa Johnson	454
10	(Japan) Izumi Yamada	396

== Team events ==
Team events in the CC history

Total	N	M	Winners	Competition
4	2	2	3	Women's team

after women's MH team event in Breitenberg (11 February 2007)

=== Calendar ===
All	No.	Date	Place (Hill)	Size	Winner	Second	Third
Women's team
4	1	11 February 2007	(Germany) Breitenberg (Baptist-Kitzlinger-Schanze HS82)	M _{002}	Germany I Anna Häfele; Ulrike Gräßler; Carina Vogt; Lisa Rexhäuser	Austria Esther Steindl; J. Seifriedsberger; Tanja Drage; Daniela Iraschko	Norway Silje Sprakehaug; Gyda Enger; Line Jahr; Anette Sagen

== Europa Cup vs. Continental Cup ==
- Last two Europa Cup seasons (1991/92 and 1992/93) are recognized as first two Continental Cup seasons by International Ski Federation (FIS), although Continental Cup under this name officially started first season in 1993/94 season.

== See also ==
- 2006–07 FIS Ski Jumping World Cup
- 2006 FIS Ski Jumping Grand Prix
