= 2005–06 FIS Ski Jumping Continental Cup =

Ski-jumping competition series

FIS Ski Jumping Continental Cup 2005/06
| Discipline | Men | Women |
| Summer | (Poland) Marcin Bachleda | — |
| Winter | (Norway) Anders Bardal | (Norway) Anette Sagen |

Competition
| Edition | 4th (Summer), 15th (Winter) | — (Summer), 2nd (Winter) |
| Locations | 7 (Summer), 14 (Winter) | — (Summer), 15 (Winter) |
| Individual | 13 (Summer), 26 (Winter) | — Summer), 18 (Winter) |
| Team | — (Summer), — (Winter) | 1 (Summer), 1 (Winter) |
| Cancelled | — (Summer), 5 (Winter) | — (Summer), 1 (Winter) |

The 2005/06 FIS Ski Jumping Continental Cup was the 15th in a row (13th official) Continental Cup winter season and the 4th official summer season in ski jumping for men.

This was also the second season for women as both summer and winter events counted as one whole season.

Beside overall, Anette Sagen also won both tournaments; 8th FIS Ladies Grand Prix and 5th FIS Ladies Summer Tournament.

Other competitive circuits in season were World Cup and Grand Prix.

== Men's Summer ==
Individual men's events in the CC history

| Total | F | L | N | Winners |
|---|---|---|---|---|
| 41 | — | 14 | 27 |

after normal hill event in Lake Placid (9 October 2005)

=== Calendar ===
| All | No. | Date | Place (Hill) | Size | Winner | Second | Third | Overall leader | R. |
|---|---|---|---|---|---|---|---|---|---|
| 29 | 1 | 8 July 2005 | (Slovenia) Velenje (Grajski grič HS94) | N _{021} | (Slovenia) Robert Kranjec | (Austria) Stefan Thurnbichler | (Finland) J.-M. Ruuskanen | (Slovenia) Robert Kranjec | |
| 30 | 2 | 9 July 2005 | (Slovenia) Velenje (Grajski grič HS94) | N _{022} | (Poland) Marcin Bachleda | (Finland) Janne Happonen | (Slovenia) Rok Benkovič | (Poland) Marcin Bachleda | |
| 31 | 3 | 10 July 2005 | (Slovenia) Kranj (Bauhenk HS109) | N _{023} | (Slovenia) Robert Kranjec | (Slovenia) Rok Benkovič | (Slovenia) Primož Peterka | (Slovenia) Robert Kranjec (Poland) Marcin Bachleda | |
| 32 | 4 | 23 July 2005 | (Switzerland) Einsiedeln (Andreas Küttel Schanze HS117) | L _{009} | (Switzerland) Andreas Küttel | (Germany) Michael Neumayer | (Switzerland) Simon Ammann | (Poland) Marcin Bachleda | |
| 33 | 5 | 24 July 2005 | (Switzerland) Einsiedeln (Andreas Küttel Schanze HS117) | L _{010} | (Poland) Marcin Bachleda | (Switzerland) Simon Ammann | (Switzerland) Michael Möllinger | (Poland) Marcin Bachleda | |
| 34 | 6 | 30 July 2005 | (Germany) Oberstdorf (Schattenbergschanze HS137) | L _{011} | (Germany) Georg Späth | (Germany) Michael Neumayer | (Russia) Dimitry Vasiliev | (Poland) Marcin Bachleda | |
| 35 | 7 | 31 July 2005 | (Germany) Oberstdorf (Schattenbergschanze HS137) | L _{012} | (Germany) Michael Neumayer | (Russia) Dimitry Vasiliev | (Germany) Georg Späth | (Poland) Marcin Bachleda | |
| 36 | 8 | 20 August 2005 | (Norway) Lillehammer (Lysgårdsbakken HS100) | N _{024} | (Norway) Anders Bardal | (United States) Clint Jones | (Slovenia) Jure Šinkovec | (Poland) Marcin Bachleda | |
| 37 | 9 | 21 August 2005 | (Norway) Lillehammer (Lysgårdsbakken HS100) | N _{025} | (Norway) Lars Bystøl | (Slovenia) Jure Šinkovec (United States) Clint Jones | | (Poland) Marcin Bachleda | |
| 38 | 10 | 1 October 2005 | (United States) Park City (Utah Olympic Park HS134) | L _{013} | (Poland) Wojciech Skupień | (Poland) Stefan Hula | (United States) Clint Jones | (Poland) Marcin Bachleda | |
| 39 | 11 | 2 October 2005 | (United States) Park City (Utah Olympic Park HS134) | L _{014} | (Poland) Marcin Bachleda | (United States) Clint Jones | (Norway) Anders Bardal | (Poland) Marcin Bachleda | |
| 40 | 12 | 8 October 2005 | (United States) Lake Placid (MacKenzie Intervale HS100) | N _{026} | (Poland) Wojciech Skupień | (Poland) Marcin Bachleda | (Norway) Anders Bardal | (Poland) Marcin Bachleda | |
| 41 | 13 | 9 October 2005 | (United States) Lake Placid (MacKenzie Intervale HS100) | N _{027} | (Norway) Anders Bardal | (Poland) Marcin Bachleda | (Norway) Morten Solem | (Poland) Marcin Bachleda | |
| 4th FIS Summer Continental Cup Men's Overall (8 July – 9 October 2005) | | | | | (Poland) Marcin Bachleda | (United States) Clint Jones | (Norway) Anders Bardal | Summer Overall | |

==== Overall ====
| Rank | after 13 events | Points |
|---|---|---|
| 1 | (Poland) Marcin Bachleda | 759 |
| 2 | (United States) Clint Jones | 473 |
| 3 | (Norway) Anders Bardal | 468 |
| 4 | (Austria) Stefan Thurnbichler | 369 |
| 5 | (Germany) Michael Neumayer | 310 |
| 6 | (Poland) Stefan Hula | 307 |
| 7 | (Poland) Wojciech Skupień | 290 |
| 8 | (Slovenia) Jure Šinkovec | 251 |
| 9 | (Norway) Morten Solem | 227 |
| 10 | (Norway) Thomas Lobben | 212 |

== Men's Winter ==
Individual men's events in the CC history

| Total | F | L | N | Winners |
|---|---|---|---|---|
| 554 | 4 | 225 | 325 |

after large hill event in Bischofshofen (12 March 2006)

=== Calendar ===
| All | No. | Date | Place (Hill) | Size | Winner | Second | Third | Overall leader | R. |
|---|---|---|---|---|---|---|---|---|---|
| 529 | 1 | 4 December 2005 | (Finland) Rovaniemi (Ounasvaara HS100) | N _{314} | (Finland) Harri Olli | (Norway) Morten Solem | (Poland) Rafał Śliż | (Finland) Harri Olli | |
| 530 | 2 | 5 December 2005 | (Finland) Rovaniemi (Ounasvaara HS100) | N _{315} | (Austria) Stefan Thurnbichler | (Finland) Harri Olli | (Norway) Morten Solem | (Finland) Harri Olli | |
| | | 7 December 2005 | (Finland) Lahti (Salpausselkä HS130) | L _{cnx} | cancelled | | | — | |
| | | 8 December 2005 | (Finland) Lahti (Salpausselkä HS130) | L _{cnx} | cancelled | | | — | |
| | | 16 December 2005 | (Czech Republic) Harrachov (Čerťák HS142) | L _{cnx} | cancelled | | | — | |
| 531 | 3 | 17 December 2005 | (Czech Republic) Harrachov (Čerťák HS142) | L _{212} | (Norway) Anders Bardal | (Slovenia) Jurij Tepeš | (Norway) Henning Stensrud | (Finland) Harri Olli | |
| | | 18 December 2005 | (Czech Republic) Harrachov (Čerťák HS142) | L _{cnx} | cancelled | | | — | |
| 532 | 4 | 26 December 2005 | (Switzerland) St. Moritz (Olympiaschanze HS100) | N _{316} | (Czech Republic) Borek Sedlák | (Japan) Masahiko Harada | (Slovenia) Rok Urbanc | (Finland) Harri Olli | |
| 533 | 5 | 27 December 2005 | (Switzerland) Engelberg (Gross-Titlis-Schanze HS137) | L _{213} | (Austria) R. Schwarzenberger | (Norway) Henning Stensrud | (Norway) Anders Bardal | (Norway) H. Stensrud | |
| 534 | 6 | 28 December 2005 | (Switzerland) Engelberg (Gross-Titlis-Schanze HS137) | L _{214} | (Austria) R. Schwarzenberger | (Norway) Henning Stensrud | (Norway) Anders Bardal | (Norway) H. Stensrud | |
| 535 | 7 | 7 January 2006 | (Slovenia) Planica (Srednja Bloudkova HS100) | N _{317} | (Slovenia) Primož Roglič | (Slovenia) Jure Šinkovec | (Slovenia) Jernej Damjan | (Norway) H. Stensrud | |
| 536 | 8 | 8 January 2006 | (Slovenia) Planica (Srednja Bloudkova HS100) | N _{318} | (Norway) Anders Bardal | (Poland) Rafał Śliż | (Slovenia) Primož Roglič | (Norway) Anders Bardal | |
| 537 | 9 | 13 January 2006 | (Japan) Sapporo (Miyanomori HS98); Ōkurayama HS134) | N _{319} | (Norway) Anders Bardal | (Austria) Manuel Fettner | (Japan) Kenshirō Itō | (Norway) Anders Bardal | |
| 538 | 10 | 14 January 2006 | (Japan) Sapporo (Miyanomori HS98); Ōkurayama HS134) | L _{215} | (Norway) Anders Bardal | (Norway) Morten Solem | (Slovenia) Rok Urbanc | (Norway) Anders Bardal | |
| 539 | 11 | 15 January 2006 | (Japan) Sapporo (Miyanomori HS98); Ōkurayama HS134) | L _{216} | (Poland) Rafał Śliż | (Austria) Manuel Fettner | (Norway) Morten Solem | (Norway) Anders Bardal | |
| 540 | 12 | 21 January 2006 | (Germany) Titisee-Neustadt (Hochfirstschanze HS142) | L _{217} | (Austria) Bastian Kaltenböck | (Austria) Roland Müller | (Austria) Mathias Hafele | (Norway) Anders Bardal | |
| 541 | 13 | 22 January 2006 | (Germany) Titisee-Neustadt (Hochfirstschanze HS142) | L _{218} | (Austria) Gerald Wambacher | (Austria) Bastian Kaltenböck | (Finland) Arttu Lappi | (Norway) Anders Bardal | |
| 542 | 14 | 28 January 2006 | (Germany) Braunlage (Wurmbergschanze HS100) | N _{320} | (Austria) Mathias Hafele | (Austria) Gerald Wambacher | (China) Li Yang | (Norway) Anders Bardal | |
| 543 | 15 | 29 January 2006 | (Germany) Braunlage (Wurmbergschanze HS100) | N _{321} | (Finland) Harri Olli | (South Korea) Choi Yong-jik | (Austria) Gerald Wambacher (Slovenia) Bine Zupan | (Norway) Anders Bardal | |
| 544 | 16 | 4 February 2006 | (Austria) Villach (Villacher Alpenarena HS98) | N _{322} | (Poland) Piotr Żyła | (Poland) Krystian Długopolski (Belarus) Maksim Anisimov (Norway) Morten Solem | | (Norway) Anders Bardal | |
| 545 | 17 | 5 February 2006 | (Austria) Villach (Villacher Alpenarena HS98) | N _{323} | (Norway) Morten Solem | (Poland) Marcin Bachleda | (Austria) Gerald Wambacher | (Norway) Anders Bardal | |
| 546 | 18 | 11 February 2006 | (Poland) Zakopane (Wielka Krokiew HS134) | L _{219} | (Austria) Daniel Lackner | (Finland) Harri Olli | (Norway) Anders Bardal | (Norway) Anders Bardal | |
| 547 | 19 | 12 February 2006 | (Poland) Zakopane (Wielka Krokiew HS134) | L _{220} | (Norway) Anders Bardal | (Norway) Morten Solem | (France) Emmanuel Chedal | (Norway) Anders Bardal | |
| 548 | 20 | 18 February 2006 | (United States) Iron Mountain (Pine Mountain HS133) | L _{221} | (Finland) Kimmo Yliriesto | (Austria) Bastian Kaltenböck | (Norway) Anders Bardal | (Norway) Anders Bardal | |
| 549 | 21 | 19 February 2006 | (United States) Iron Mountain (Pine Mountain HS133) | L _{222} | (Austria) Daniel Lackner | (Norway) Anders Bardal | (Norway) Morten Solem | (Norway) Anders Bardal | |
| | | 25 February 2006 | (Germany) Brotterode (Inselbergschanze HS117) | L _{cnx} | cancelled due to unfavorable weather conditions | | | — | |
| 550 | 22 | 26 February 2006 | (Germany) Brotterode (Inselbergschanze HS117) | L _{223} | (Finland) Harri Olli | (Norway) Anders Bardal | (Austria) Daniel Lackner | (Norway) Anders Bardal | |
| 551 | 23 | 4 March 2006 | (Norway) Vikersund (Vikersundbakken HS100) | N _{324} | (Norway) Thomas Lobben | (Austria) R. Schwarzenberger | (Slovenia) Primož Roglič | (Norway) Anders Bardal | |
| 552 | 24 | 5 March 2006 | (Norway) Vikersund (Vikersundbakken HS100) | N _{325} | (Norway) Thomas Lobben | (Austria) Mathias Hafele | (Austria) Stefan Thurnbichler | (Norway) Anders Bardal | |
| 553 | 25 | 11 March 2006 | (Austria) Bischofshofen (Paul-Ausserleitner HS140) | L _{224} | (Slovenia) Bine Zupan | (Austria) Arthur Pauli | (Slovenia) Robert Kranjec | (Norway) Anders Bardal | |
| 554 | 26 | 12 March 2006 | (Austria) Bischofshofen (Paul-Ausserleitner HS140) | L _{225} | (Slovenia) Robert Kranjec | (Austria) Balthasar Schneider | (Finland) Veli-Matti Lindström | (Norway) Anders Bardal | |
| 15th FIS Winter Continental Cup Men's Overall (4 December 2005 – 12 March 2006) | | | | | (Norway) Anders Bardal | (Norway) Morten Solem | (Austria) Mathias Hafele | Winter Overall | |

==== Overall ====
| Rank | after 26 events | Points |
|---|---|---|
| 1 | (Norway) Anders Bardal | 1071 |
| 2 | (Norway) Morten Solem | 847 |
| 3 | (Austria) Mathias Hafele | 724 |
| 4 | (Austria) Gerald Wambacher | 617 |
| 5 | (Slovenia) Rok Urbanc | 529 |
| 6 | (Austria) Bastian Kaltenböck | 526 |
| 7 | (Finland) Harri Olli | 517 |
| 8 | (Poland) Rafał Śliż | 478 |
| 9 | (Austria) Daniel Lackner | 463 |
| 10 | (Austria) Roland Müller | 451 |

== Women's Individual ==
Individual women's events in the CC Cup history

| Total | L | N | M | Winners |
|---|---|---|---|---|
| 30 | 1 | 23 | 6 |

after normal hill event in Våler (8 March 2006)

=== Calendar ===
| All | No. | Date | Place (Hill) | Size | Winner | Second | Third | R. |
|---|---|---|---|---|---|---|---|---|
| 13 | 1 | 7 August 2005 | (Austria) Bischofshofen (Laideregg-Schanze HS65) | M _{002} | (Norway) Line Jahr | (Norway) Anette Sagen | (United States) Jessica Jerome | |
| 14 | 2 | 9 August 2005 | (Germany) Klingenthal (Vogtlandschanze HS85) | N _{011} | (Canada) Katie Willis | (Norway) Anette Sagen | (United States) Jessica Jerome | |
| 15 | 3 | 11 August 2005 | (Germany) Pöhla (Pöhlbachschanze HS66) | M _{003} | (Norway) Anette Sagen | (Norway) Line Jahr | (United States) Jessica Jerome | |
| 16 | 4 | 14 August 2005 | (Germany) Meinerzhagen (Meinhardus-Schanze HS65) | M _{004} | (Norway) Anette Sagen | (Italy) Lisa Demetz | (United States) Lindsey Van | |
| 5th FIS Ladies Summer Tournament Overall (7 – 14 August 2005) | | | | | (Norway) Anette Sagen | (United States) Jessica Jerome | (Norway) Line Jahr | |
| 17 | 5 | 1 October 2005 | (United States) Park City (Utah Olympic Park HS100) | N _{012} | (United States) Lindsey Van | (United States) Abby Hughes | (Norway) Anette Sagen | |
| 18 | 6 | 2 October 2005 | (United States) Park City (Utah Olympic Park HS100) | N _{013} | (Canada) Atsuko Tanaka | (United States) Jessica Jerome | (United States) Lindsey Van | |
| 19 | 7 | 8 October 2005 | (United States) Lake Placid (MacKenzie Intervale HS100) | N _{014} | (Norway) Anette Sagen | (Austria) Daniela Iraschko | (Germany) Ulrike Gräßler | |
| 20 | 8 | 9 October 2005 | (United States) Lake Placid (MacKenzie Intervale HS100) | N _{015} | (Norway) Anette Sagen | (Canada) Line Jahr | (Canada) Atsuko Tanaka | |
| 21 | 9 | 14 January 2006 | (Slovenia) Ljubno (Savina HS95) | N _{016} | (Norway) Anette Sagen | (United States) Lindsey Van | (Germany) Jenna Mohr | |
| 22 | 10 | 18 January 2006 | (Italy) Toblach (Trampolino Sulzenhof HS74) | M _{005} | (Norway) Anette Sagen | (Italy) Lisa Demetz | (United States) Jessica Jerome | |
| | | 21 January 2006 | (Austria) Achomitz (Natursprunganlage HS80) | N _{cnx} | cancelled | | | |
| 23 | 11 | 9 February 2006 | (Germany) Baiersbronn (Große Ruhesteinschanze HS90) | N _{017} | (Norway) Anette Sagen | (Germany) Juliane Seyfarth | (United States) Lindsey Van | |
| 24 | 12 | 11 February 2006 | (Germany) Schönwald (Adlerschanzen Schönwald HS93) | N _{018} | (Germany) Juliane Seyfarth | (United States) Lindsey Van (Norway) Anette Sagen | | |
| 25 | 13 | 15 February 2006 | (Austria) Saalfelden (Bibergschanze HS95) | N _{019} | (Norway) Anette Sagen | (United States) Lindsey Van | (Germany) Ulrike Gräßler | |
| 26 | 14 | 18 February 2006 | (Germany) Breitenberg (Baptist-Kitzlinger-Schanze HS82) | M _{006} | (Norway) Anette Sagen | (Germany) Juliane Seyfarth | (United States) Jessica Jerome | |
| 8th FIS Ladies Grand Prix Overall (9 – 18 February 2006) | | | | | (Norway) Anette Sagen | (United States) Lindsey Van | (Germany) Juliane Seyfarth | |
| 27 | 15 | 1 March 2006 | (Japan) Zaō (Yamagata HS100) | N _{020} | (United States) Lindsey Van | (Norway) Anette Sagen | (United States) Jessica Jerome (Austria) J. Seifriedsberger | |
| 28 | 16 | 2 March 2006 | (Japan) Zaō (Yamagata HS100) | N _{021} | (United States) Lindsey Van | (Norway) Anette Sagen | (Japan) Izumi Yamada | |
| 29 | 17 | 5 March 2006 | (Norway) Vikersund (Vikersundbakken HS100) | N _{022} | (Germany) Juliane Seyfarth | (Norway) Anette Sagen | (Norway) Line Jahr | |
| 30 | 18 | 8 March 2006 | (Norway) Våler (Gjerdrumsbakken HS100) | N _{023} | (United States) Lindsey Van | (Norway) Line Jahr | (Germany) Ulrike Gräßler | |
| 2nd FIS Continental Cup Women's Overall (7 August 2005 – 8 March 2006) | | | | | (Norway) Anette Sagen | (United States) Lindsey Van | (United States) Jessica Jerome | |

==== Overall ====
| Rank | after 18 events | Points |
|---|---|---|
| 1 | (Norway) Anette Sagen | 1540 |
| 2 | (United States) Lindsey Van | 1159 |
| 3 | (United States) Jessica Jerome | 860 |
| 4 | (Norway) Line Jahr | 839 |
| 5 | (Germany) Juliane Seyfarth | 757 |
| 6 | (Italy) Lisa Demetz | 574 |
| 7 | (Austria) Daniela Iraschko | 511 |
| 8 | (Canada) Atsuko Tanaka | 491 |
| 9 | (United States) Abby Hughes | 480 |
| 10 | (Germany) Ulrike Gräßler | 463 |

== Team events ==
Team events in the CC history

| Total | N | M | Winners | Competition |
|---|---|---|---|---|
| 3 | 2 | 1 | 2 | Women's team |

after women's NH team event in Schönwald (12 February 2006)

=== Calendar ===
| All | No. | Date | Place (Hill) | Size | Winner | Second | Third | R. |
Women's team
| 2 | 1 | 13 August 2005 | (Germany) Meinerzhagen (Meinhardus-Schanze HS65) | M _{001} | United States Lindsey Van; Jessica Jerome; Brenna Ellis; Abby Hughes | Slovenia Maja Vtič; Eva Logar; Monika Pogladič; Katja Požun | Germany I Lisa Rexhäuser; Melanie Faißt; Juliane Seyfarth; Kristin Schmidt | |
| 3 | 2 | 12 February 2006 | (Germany) Schönwald (Adlerschanzen Schönwald HS93) | N _{002} | United States Alissa Johnson; Abby Hughes; Jessica Jerome; Lindsey Van | Germany I Jenna Mohr; Anna Häfele; Ulrike Gräßler; Juliane Seyfarth | Norway Silje Sprakehaug; Mari Backe; Line Jahr; Anette Sagen | |

== Europa Cup vs. Continental Cup ==
- Last two Europa Cup seasons (1991/92 and 1992/93) are recognized as first two Continental Cup seasons by International Ski Federation (FIS), although Continental Cup under this name officially started first season in 1993/94 season.

== See also ==
- 2005–06 FIS Ski Jumping World Cup
- 2005 FIS Ski Jumping Grand Prix
