= 2003–04 FIS Ski Jumping Continental Cup =

Ski-jumping competition series

Continental Cup 2003/04
Winners
- Summer: (Slovenia) Bine Norčič
- Winter: (Norway) Olav Magne Dønnem

Competitions
- Venues: 5 (summer), 12 (winter)
- Individual: 10 (summer), 25 (winter)
- Cancelled: 6

The 2003/04 FIS Ski Jumping Continental Cup was the 13th in a row (11th official) Continental Cup winter season and the 2nd summer season in ski jumping for men.

Other competitive circuits this season included the World Cup and Grand Prix.

== Men's Individual ==
Individual men's events in the Continental Cup history

Total	F	L	N	Winners	Competition
20	—	6	14	14	Summer
498	4	194	300	200	Winter

after large hill winter event in Vikersund (7 March 2004)

=== Summer ===
Num	Season	Date	Place	Hill	Size	Winner	Second	Third
11	1	4 July 2003	(Slovenia) Velenje	Grajski grič K85	N _{009}	(Slovenia) Jure Radelj	(Slovenia) Rok Benkovič	(Slovenia) Primož Peterka
12	3	5 July 2003	(Slovenia) Velenje	Grajski grič K85	N _{010}	(Finland) Akseli Kokkonen	(Slovenia) Jure Radelj	(Slovenia) Damjan Fras
13	3	19 July 2003	(Canada) Calgary	Alberta Ski Jump K89	NH	(Slovenia) Bine Norčič	(Japan) Hiroki Yamada	(United States) Clint Jones
14	4	20 July 2003	(Canada) Calgary	Alberta Ski Jump K89	NH	(Poland) Marcin Bachleda	(United States) Clint Jones	(Slovenia) Primož Pikl
15	5	25 July 2003	(United States) Park City	Utah Olympic Park K120	L _{003}	(Japan) Teppei Takano	(United States) Clint Jones	(Slovenia) Bine Norčič
16	6	26 July 2003	(United States) Park City	Utah Olympic Park K120	LH	(Poland) Marcin Bachleda	(Slovenia) Bine Norčič	(Slovenia) Bine Zupan
17	7	2 August 2003	(Germany) Garmisch-Partenkirchen	Mittlere Olympiaschanze K89	NH	(Austria) Wolfgang Loitzl	(Austria) Martin Koch	(Germany) Stefan Pieper
18	8	3 August 2003	(Germany) Garmisch-Partenkirchen	Mittlere Olympiaschanze K89	N _{014}	(Austria) Wolfgang Loitzl (Finland) Akseli Kokkonen		(Poland) Wojciech Skupień (Finland) Jussi Hautamäki
19	9	23 August 2003	(Norway) Trondheim	Granåsen K120	LH	(Austria) Wolfgang Loitzl	(Finland) Veli-Matti Lindström	(Japan) Hiroki Yamada
20	10	24 August 2003	(Norway) Trondheim	Granåsen K120	L _{006}	(Norway) Lars Bystøl	(Finland) Veli-Matti Lindström	(Austria) Wolfgang Loitzl

=== Winter ===
Num	Season	Date	Place	Hill	Size	Winner	Second	Third
		6 December 2003	(Finland) Lahti	Salpausselkä K116	LH	canceled		
		7 December 2003	(Finland) Lahti	Salpausselkä K116	LH	canceled		
474	1	13 December 2003	(Norway) Lillehammer	Lysgårdsbakken K120	L _{179}	(Norway) Lars Bystøl	(Austria) Wolfgang Loitzl	(Norway) Morten Solem
475	2	14 December 2003	(Norway) Lillehammer	Lysgårdsbakken K120	LH	(Norway) Lars Bystøl	(Norway) Kim-Roar Hansen	(Austria) Stefan Kaiser
		20 December 2003	(Czechoslovakia) Liberec	Ještěd A K120	LH	canceled		
		21 December 2003	(Czechoslovakia) Liberec	Ještěd A K120	LH	canceled		
476	3	26 December 2003	(Switzerland) St. Moritz	Olympiaschanze K95	N _{294}	(Austria) Christian Nagiller	(Slovenia) Jernej Damjan	(Austria) Balthasar Schneider
477	4	27 December 2003	(Switzerland) Engelberg	Gross-Titlis-Schanze K120	LH	(Austria) Roland Müller	(Austria) Stefan Kaiser	(Germany) Ferdinand Bader
		28 December 2003	(Switzerland) Engelberg	Gross-Titlis-Schanze K120	LH	canceled		
478	5	1 January 2004	(Austria) Seefeld	Toni-Seelos-Olympiaschanze K90	NH			
479	6	3 January 2004	(Slovenia) Planica	Srednja Bloudkova K90	NH			
	7	4 January 2004	(Slovenia) Planica	Srednja Bloudkova K90	NH			
481	8	9 January 2004	(Japan) Sapporo	Miyanomori K90	NH	(Austria) Stefan Kaiser	(Norway) Olav Magne Dønnem	(Austria) Stefan Thurnbichler
482	9	10 January 2004	(Japan) Sapporo	Ōkurayama K120	LH	(Japan) Akira Higashi	(Norway) Olav Magne Dønnem	(Austria) Stefan Thurnbichler
483	10	11 January 2004	(Japan) Sapporo	Ōkurayama K120	LH	(Japan) Akira Higashi	(Austria) Martin Koch	(Japan) Tsuyoshi Ichinohe
484	11	17 January 2004	(Austria) Bischofshofen	Paul-Ausserleitner-Schanze K120	LH	(Norway) Olav Magne Dønnem	(Germany) Ferdinand Bader	(Germany) Stefan Pieper
485	12	18 January 2004	(Austria) Bischofshofen	Paul-Ausserleitner-Schanze K120	LH	(Norway) Olav Magne Dønnem	(Germany) Ferdinand Bader	(Austria) Balthasar Schneider
486	13	24 January 2004	(Germany) Braunlage	Wurmbergschanze K90	NH	(Austria) Andreas Widhölzl	(Finland) Janne Happonen	(Austria) Stefan Kaiser
487	14	25 January 2004	(Germany) Braunlage	Wurmbergschanze K90	N _{300}	(Finland) Janne Happonen	(Austria) Balthasar Schneider	(Austria) Andreas Widhölzl
488	15	31 January 2004	(Germany) Brotterode	Inselbergschanze K105	LH	(Germany) Jörg Ritzerfeld	(Austria) Andreas Widhölzl	(Germany) Stephan Hocke
489	16	1 February 2004	(Germany) Brotterode	Inselbergschanze K105	LH	(Finland) Pekka Salminen	(Germany) Stephan Hocke	(Kazakhstan) Radik Zhaparov
		7 February 2004	(Poland) Zakopane	Wielka Krokiew K120	LH	canceled		
490	17	8 February 2004	(Poland) Zakopane	Wielka Krokiew K120	LH	(Austria) Reinhard Schwarzenberger	(Austria) Christian Nagiller	(Slovenia) Jernej Damjan
491	18	14 February 2004	(United States) Westby	Snowflake K106	LH	(Austria) Christian Nagiller	(Austria) Bernhard Metzler	(Austria) Balthasar Schneider
492	19	15 February 2004	(United States) Westby	Snowflake K106	LH	(Slovenia) Jernej Damjan	(Austria) Stefan Thurnbichler	(Austria) Balthasar Schneider
493	20	22 February 2004	(United States) Iron Mountain	Pine Mountain Ski Jump K120	LH	(Austria) Reinhard Schwarzenberger	(Germany) Stephan Hocke	(Austria) Stefan Kaiser (Norway) Olav Magne Dønnem
494	21	23 February 2004	(United States) Iron Mountain	Pine Mountain Ski Jump K120	LH	(Austria) Reinhard Schwarzenberger	(Austria) Balthasar Schneider	(Norway) Olav Magne Dønnem
495	22	28 February 2004	(Finland) Kuopio	Puijo K120	LH	(Finland) Janne Happonen	(Austria) Andreas Widhölzl	(Austria) Roland Müller
496	23	29 February 2004	(Finland) Kuopio	Puijo K120	L _{194}	(Finland) Janne Happonen	(Finland) Olli Pekkala	(Austria) Balthasar Schneider
497	24	6 March 2004	(Norway) Vikersund	Vikersundbakken K185	F _{003}	(Austria) Roland Müller	(Norway) Olav Magne Dønnem	(Austria) Balthasar Schneider
498	25	7 March 2004	(Norway) Vikersund	Vikersundbakken K185	F _{004}	(Austria) Roland Müller	(Austria) Balthasar Schneider	(Austria) Martin Koch

== Standings ==
=== Summer ===
Rank	after 10 events	Points
1	(Slovenia) Bine Norčič	391
2	(Slovenia) Jure Radelj	369
3	(Austria) Wolfgang Loitzl	360
4	(Poland) Marcin Bachleda	331
5	(Slovenia) Primož Pikl	291

=== Winter ===
Rank	after 25 events	Points
1	(Norway) Olav Magne Dønnem	935
2	(Austria) Balthasar Schneider	924
3	(Austria) Stefan Kaiser	773
4	(Austria) Roland Müller	607
5	(Austria) Christian Nagiller	555

== Europa Cup vs. Continental Cup ==
This was originally last Europa Cup season and is also recognized as the first Continental Cup season by International Ski Federation although under this name began its first official season in 1993/94.
