= FIS Ski Jumping Continental Cup =

Annual ski-jumping competition series

Ski Jumping Continental Cup
- Genre: ski jumping ski flying (rarely)
- Inaugurated: 1991/92 (Europa/Continental Cup); 1992/93 (Europa/Continental Cup); 1993/94 (1st official men season); 2002/03 (men's summer season); 2004/05 (1st women season); 2008/09 (women's summer season)
- Organiser: International Ski Federation

The FIS Ski Jumping Continental Cup is a series of ski jumping competitions arranged yearly by the International Ski Federation. It is considered the second level of international ski jumping, ranking below the World Cup and not counting Grand Prix which world top class summer competition. Athletes competing in the Continental Cup are usually juniors and jumpers fighting for a spot on their nation's World Cup team. Some jumpers alternate between the World Cup and the Continental Cup and therefore, the winner of the Continental Cup is not necessarily the best jumper.

International Ski Federation considers the last two Europa Cup seasons in 1991/92 and 1992/93 where they competed only in Europe and with only European ski jumpers, as first two continental cup season. However, men officially began first season in 1993/94 spreading, with hosts spreading from Europe to Asian and North American ground. Competitors from United States, Canada and Asia previously competed in their own Pacific Rum Cup which was canceled, joined with Europeans on the second level of world ski jumping competition. Summer continental cup event was first time organized in 1996, however those summer events counted together in joined overall winter ranking until 2001/02. But from the season 2002/03 on, summer events counts in separated men's summer rankings.

The women competition was introduced in the 2004/05. Summer events organized already in first season like with men counted together in joined overall winter ranking until 2007/08. But from the 2008/09 on, summer events counts in separated women's summer rankings. Until the 2010/11 this was the women's top international ski jumping competition and the season later, World Cup for women was introduced in 2011/12.

So far only four individual and none of the team events in this competition have been held on ski flying hills: two events in Ironwood (1994) and two events in Vikersund (2004).

Higher competitive circuits are the World Cup and the Summer Grand Prix; the lower circuits include the FIS Cup, the FIS Race and the Alpen Cup.

== Men's standings ==
last two season of Europa Cup also counted as Continental Cup seasons

=== Winter ===
| Season | Winner | Runner-up | Third |
|---|---|---|---|
| 1991/92 | (Austria) Andreas Rauschmeier | (Austria) Franz Neuländtner | (Germany) Remo Lederer |
| 1992/93 | (Austria) Franz Neuländtner | (Austria) Christian Moser | (Austria) Christoph Müller |
| 1993/94 | (Germany) Ralph Gebstedt | (Germany) Ronny Hornschuh | (Austria) Klaus Huber |
| 1994/95 | (Finland) Olli Happonen | (Austria) Martin Höllwarth | (Finland) Risto Jussilainen |
| 1995/96 | (Norway) Stein Henrik Tuff | (Austria) Michael Kury | (Germany) Hansjörg Jäkle |
| 1996/97 | (Norway) Hein-Arne Mathiesen | (Norway) Simen Berntsen | (Czech Republic) Roman Krenek |
| 1997/98 | (Germany) Alexander Herr | (Austria) Falko Krismayr | (Slovenia) Damjan Fras |
| 1998/99 | (Germany) Roland Audenrieth | (Norway) Marius Småriset | (Norway) Wilhelm Brenna |
| 1999/00 | (Germany) Dirk Else | (Germany) Georg Späth | (Germany) Dennis Störl |
| 2000/01 | (Finland) Akseli Lajunen | (Germany) Christoph Grillhösl | (Finland) Lassi Huuskonen |
| 2001/02 | (Germany) Michael Neumayer | (Finland) Janne Ylijärvi | (Germany) Jörg Ritzerfeld |
| 2002/03 | (Austria) Stefan Thurnbichler | (Norway) Morten Solem | (Switzerland) Michael Möllinger |
| 2003/04 | (Norway) Olav Magne Dønnem | (Austria) Balthasar Schneider | (Austria) Stefan Kaiser |
| 2004/05 | (Norway) Anders Bardal | (Austria) Balthasar Schneider | (Austria) Stefan Thurnbichler |
| 2005/06 | (Norway) Anders Bardal | (Norway) Morten Solem | (Austria) Mathias Hafele |
| 2006/07 | (Austria) Balthasar Schneider | (Norway) Morten Solem | (Austria) Stefan Thurnbichler |
| 2007/08 | (Austria) Stefan Thurnbichler | (Austria) Bastian Kaltenböck | (Norway) Lars Bystøl |
| 2008/09 | (Austria) Stefan Thurnbichler | (Czech Republic) Lukas Hlava | (Germany) Christian Ulmer |
| 2009/10 | (Austria) David Unterberger | (Austria) Michael Hayböck | (Austria) Manuel Fettner |
| 2010/11 | (Slovenia) Rok Zima | (Austria) Mario Innauer | (Germany) Andreas Wank |
| 2011/12 | (Norway) Andreas Stjernen | (Norway) Kenneth Gangnes | (Austria) Michael Hayböck |
| 2012/13 | (Norway) Fredrik Bjerkeengen | (Germany) Marinus Kraus | (Czech Republic) Jan Matura |
| 2013/14 | (Austria) Manuel Fettner | (Slovenia) Nejc Dežman | (Slovenia) Rok Justin |
| 2014/15 | (Slovenia) Anže Semenič | (Norway) Kenneth Gangnes | (Slovenia) Miran Zupančič |
| 2015/16 | (Norway) Tom Hilde | (Austria) Clemens Aigner | (Germany) Karl Geiger |
| 2016/17 | (Austria) Clemens Aigner | (Slovenia) Miran Zupančič | (Slovenia) Nejc Dežman |
| 2017/18 | (Norway) Marius Lindvik | (Germany) Andreas Wank | (Germany) David Siegel |
| 2018/19 | (Austria) Clemens Aigner | (Poland) Aleksander Zniszczol | (Norway) Marius Lindvik |
| 2019/20 | (Austria) Clemens Leitner | (Austria) Clemens Aigner | (Japan) Taku Takeuchi |
| 2020/21 | (Austria) Markus Schiffner | (Austria) Ulrich Wohlgenannt | (Austria) Manuel Fettner |
| 2021/22 | (Austria) Thomas Lackner | (Norway) Joacim Ødegård Bjøreng | (Austria) Ulrich Wohlgenannt |
| 2022/23 | (Norway) Benjamin Østvold | (Norway) Fredrik Villumstad | (Norway) Sondre Ringen |
| 2023/24 | (Austria) Maximilian Ortner | (Austria) Jonas Schuster | (Austria) Francisco Mörth |

=== Summer ===
| Season | Winner | Runner-up | Third |
|---|---|---|---|
| 2002 | (Germany) Stefan Pieper | (Germany) Kai Bracht | (Slovenia) Rok Benkovič |
| 2003 | (Slovenia) Bine Norčič | (Slovenia) Jure Radelj | (Austria) Wolfgang Loitzl |
| 2004 | (Poland) Robert Mateja | (Austria) Stefan Kaiser | (Slovenia) Jernej Damjan |
| 2005 | (Poland) Marcin Bachleda | (United States) Clint Jones | (Norway) Anders Bardal |
| 2006 | (Austria) Stefan Thurnbichler | (Slovenia) Rok Benkovič | (Slovenia) Primož Pikl |
| 2007 | (Austria) Bastian Kaltenböck | (Austria) Stefan Thurnbichler | (Slovenia) Primož Pikl |
| 2008 | (Austria) Daniel Lackner | (Austria) Markus Eggenhofer | (Germany) Severin Freund |
| 2009 | (Slovenia) Robert Kranjec | (Norway) Akseli Kokkonen | (Poland) Marcin Bachleda |
| 2010 | (Poland) Kamil Stoch | (Czech Republic) Jakub Janda | (Austria) Andreas Strolz |
| 2011 | (Poland) Aleksander Zniszczoł | (Slovenia) Peter Prevc | (Germany) Andreas Wank |
| 2012 | (Czech Republic) Jan Matura | (Austria) Wolfgang Loitzl | (Norway) Anders Jacobsen |
| 2013 | (Germany) Marinus Kraus | (Czech Republic) Jakub Janda | (Poland) Krzysztof Biegun |
| 2014 | (Poland) Jakub Wolny | (Slovenia) Cene Prevc | (Slovenia) Miran Zupančič |
| 2015 | (Norway) Daniel-André Tande | (Poland) Dawid Kubacki | (Poland) Maciej Kot |
| 2016 | (Germany) Markus Eisenbichler | (Poland) Jan Ziobro | (Slovenia) Rok Justin |
| 2017 | (Poland) Klemens Murańka | (Slovenia) Tilen Bartol | (Germany) Pius Paschke |
| 2018 | (Austria) Philip Aschenwald | (Slovenia) Žak Mogel | (Switzerland) Killian Peier |
| 2019 | (Poland) Klemens Murańka | (Slovenia) Rok Justin | (Germany) Pius Paschke |
| 2020 | (Germany) Martin Hamann | (Norway) Sander Vossan Eriksen | (Slovenia) Anže Lanišek |
| 2021 | (Austria) Manuel Fettner | (Austria) Mika Schwann | (Norway) Fredrik Villumstad |
| 2022 | (Austria) Michael Hayböck | (Poland) Aleksander Zniszczoł | (Norway) Sondre Ringen (Norway) Kristoffer Eriksen Sundal |
| 2023 | (Germany) Pius Paschke | (Austria) Clemens Leitner | (Austria) Maximilian Steiner |
| 2024 | (Austria) Clemens Aigner | (Austria) Manuel Fettner | (Norway) Fredrik Villumstad |
| 2025 | (Poland) Kacper Tomasiak | (Austria) Jonas Schuster | (Austria) Clemens Aigner |

== Women's standings ==
=== Winter ===
| Season | Winner | Runner-up | Third |
|---|---|---|---|
| 2004/05 | (Norway) Anette Sagen | (United States) Lindsey Van | (Austria) Daniela Iraschko |
| 2005/06 | (Norway) Anette Sagen | (United States) Lindsey Van | (United States) Jessica Jerome |
| 2006/07 | (Norway) Anette Sagen | (Germany) Ulrike Grässler | (United States) Lindsey Van |
| 2007/08 | (Norway) Anette Sagen | (Austria) Daniela Iraschko | (Austria) Jacqueline Seifriedsberger |
| 2008/09 | (Norway) Anette Sagen | (Austria) Daniela Iraschko | (Germany) Ulrike Grässler |
| 2009/10 | (Austria) Daniela Iraschko | (Germany) Ulrike Grässler | (Norway) Anette Sagen |
| 2010/11 | (Austria) Daniela Iraschko | (France) Coline Mattel | (Slovenia) Eva Logar |
| 2011/12 | (Austria) Daniela Iraschko | (United States) Sarah Hendrickson | (Slovenia) Maja Vtic |
| 2012/13 | (Russia) Irina Avvakumova | (Finland) Julia Kykkänen | (Germany) Ramona Straub |
| 2013/14 | (United States) Nina Lussi | (Finland) Susanna Forsström | (Germany) Juliane Seyfarth |
| 2014/15 | (Norway) Anette Sagen | (Austria) Daniela Iraschko-Stolz | (Canada) Taylor Henrich |
| 2015/16 | (Switzerland) Sabrina Windmüller | (Austria) Julia Huber | (Norway) Anna Odine Strøm |
| 2016/17 | (France) Josephine Pagnier | (Germany) Luisa Görlich | (Germany) Pauline Heßler |
| 2017/18 | (Russia) Lidiia Iakovleva | (Austria) Daniela Iraschko-Stolz | (Russia) Aleksandra Barantceva |
| 2018/19 | (Slovenia) Katra Komar | (Poland) Kamila Karpiel | (Austria) Elisabeth Raudaschl |
| 2019/20 | (Russia) Ksenia Kablukova | (Austria) Sophie Sorschag | (Germany) Pauline Heßler |
| 2020/21 | (Austria) Hannah Wiegele | (Russia) Ksenia Kablukova | (Austria) Julia Mühlbacher |
| 2021/22 | (Germany) Luisa Görlich | (Austria) Hannah Wiegele | (Austria) Sophie Sorschag |
| 2022/23 | (Germany) Michelle Göbel | (Norway) Nora Midtsundstad | (Germany) Juliane Seyfarth |

=== Summer ===
| Season | Winner | Runner-up | Third |
|---|---|---|---|
| 2008 | (Germany) Ulrike Gräßler | (Germany) Magdalena Schnurr | (Japan) Izumi Yamada |
| 2009 | (Germany) Ulrike Gräßler | (Japan) Ayumi Watase | (Germany) Melanie Faißt |
| 2010 | (Austria) Daniela Iraschko | (Austria) Jacqueline Seifriedsberger | (France) Coline Mattel |
| 2011 | (France) Coline Mattel | (Japan) Sara Takanashi | (Austria) Daniela Iraschko |
| 2012 | (Austria) Daniela Iraschko (Austria) Jacqueline Seifriedsberger | | (Slovenia) Anja Tepeš |
| 2013 | (Slovenia) Ema Klinec | (United States) Jessica Jerome (Norway) Line Jahr | |
| 2014 | (Japan) Sara Takanashi | (United States) Sarah Hendrickson | (France) Coline Mattel |
| 2015 | (Slovenia) Ema Klinec (Japan) Sara Takanashi (Norway) Maren Lundby (Norway) Line Jahr | | |
| 2016 | (France) Lucile Morat | (Germany) Katharina Althaus | (Austria) Julia Huber (Germany) Ramona Straub |
| 2017 | (Poland) Kamila Karpiel | (Germany) Ramona Straub | (Germany) Juliane Seyfarth |
| 2018 | (Germany) Katharina Althaus | (Japan) Kaori Iwabuchi | (Germany) Juliane Seyfarth |
| 2019 | (Austria) Marita Kramer | (Norway) Gyda Westvold Hansen | (Czech Republic) Karolína Indráčková |
| 2020 | not held | | |
| 2021 | (Austria) Julia Mühlbacher (Austria) Hannah Wiegele | | (China) Bing Dong |
| 2022 | (Canada) Abigail Strate | (Canada) Natalie Eilers | (Norway) Nora Midtsundstad |

== Wins ==
First 408 individual events for men between 1991 and 2001 are not yet calculated in the incomplete winning statistics list at the International Ski Federation official homepage, where they currently run statistics only from 17 November 2001 on. However in this table all wins and also those from 1991 and 2001 period are included. For example: leader in this statistics Manuel Fettner has actually 21 wins and not 19 as mentioned in FIS statistics. He achieved those two wins before 17 November 2001.

still active career

=== Men ===
As of 8 March 2020

| Rank | | Wins |
|---|---|---|
| 1 | (Austria) Manuel Fettner | 21 |
| 2 | (Slovenia) Robert Kranjec | 19 |
| | (Austria) Clemens Aigner | 19 |
| 4 | (Austria) Stefan Thurnbichler | 18 |
| 5 | (Austria) Wolfgang Loitzl | 17 |
| 6 | (Norway) Anders Bardal | 14 |
| 7 | (Austria) Reinhard Schwarzenberger | 12 |
| | (Poland) Klemens Murańka | 12 |
| 9 | (Czech Republic) Jakub Janda | 11 |
| | (Austria) Bastian Kaltenböck | 11 |
| | (Norway) Morten Solem | 11 |
| | (Austria) Martin Höllwarth | 11 |
| | (Slovenia) Rok Justin | 11 |
| 14 | (Slovenia) Anže Lanišek | 10 |
| | (Norway) Marius Lindvik | 10 |
| | (Austria) Michael Hayböck | 10 |
| 17 | (Germany) Markus Eisenbichler | 9 |
| | (Austria) Philipp Aschenwald | 9 |
| | (Slovenia) Anže Semenič | 9 |
| | (Germany) Stephan Hocke | 9 |
| 21 | (Finland) Janne Happonen | 8 |
| | (Austria) Andreas Widhölzl | 8 |
| | (Norway) Thomas Lobben | 8 |
| | (Slovenia) Peter Prevc | 8 |

- After total of 1148 (summer+winter) events.

=== Women ===
As of 17 March 2023 (final Women's Continental Cup competition)

| Rank | | Wins |
|---|---|---|
| 1 | (Austria) Daniela Iraschko-Stolz | 51 |
| 2 | (Norway) Anette Sagen | 46 |
| 3 | (Germany) Ulrike Gräßler | 15 |
| 4 | (Germany) Juliane Seyfarth | 13 |
| 5 | (France) Coline Mattel | 9 |
| 5 | (Japan) Sara Takanashi | 9 |
| 7 | (United States) Lindsey Van | 8 |
| 8 | (Austria) Jacqueline Seifriedsberger | 7 |
| 9 | (Germany) Katharina Schmid | 6 |

- After total of 265 (summer+winter) events.

== Double wins ==
=== Men ===
| No. | Season | Date | Place | Hill | Size | Winners | |
|---|---|---|---|---|---|---|---|
| 1 | 1993/94 | 19 December 1993 | (Austria) Wörgl | Latella-Schanze K83 | NH | (Austria) Andreas Beck | (Norway) Hakon Johnsen |
| 2 | 1995/96 | 2 March 1996 | (Sweden) Örnsköldsvik | Paradiskullen K90 | NH | (Norway) Wilhelm Brenna | (Norway) Håvard Lie |
| 3 | 1996/97 | 10 January 1997 | (Austria) Ramsau | W90-Mattensprunganlage K90 | NH | (Germany) Frank Reichel | (Norway) Hein-Arne Mathiesen |
| 4 | 1997/98 | 21 December 1997 | (Finland) Lahti | Salpausselkä K90 | NH | (Norway) Tom Aage Aarnes | (Norway) Frode Håre |
| 5 | 1998/99 | 12 March 1999 | (Norway) Vikersund | Vikersundbakken K90 | NH | (Norway) Wilhelm Brenna | (Norway) Kjell Erik Sagbakken |
| 6 | 1999/00 | 18 July 1999 | (Austria) Villach | Villacher Alpenarena K90 | NH | (Germany) Dennis Störl | (Austria) Bernhard Metzler |
| 7 | 1999/00 | 10 March 2000 | (Norway) Våler | Čerťák K90 | NH | (Norway) Bjørn Einar Romøren | (Germany) Roland Audenrieth |
| 8 | 2000/01 | 19 August 2000 | (Norway) Rælingen | Marikollen K88 | NH | (Norway) Morten Solem | (Finland) Toni Nieminen |
| 9 | 2000/01 | 10 March 2001 | (Norway) Vikersund | Vikersundbakken K90 | NH | (Austria) Bernhard Metzler | (Japan) Yukitaka Fukita |
| 10 | 2003/04 | 3 August 2003 | (Germany) Garmisch-Partenkirchen | Mittlere Olympiaschanze K89 | NH | (Austria) Wolfgang Loitzl | (Finland) Akseli Kokkonen |
| 12 | 2009/10 | 3 July 2009 | (Slovenia) Velenje | Grajski grič HS94 (night) | NH | (Slovenia) Robert Kranjec | (Slovenia) Primož Pikl |
| 13 | 2010/11 | 18 December 2010 | (Turkey) Erzurum | Kiremitliktepe HS109 | NH | (Finland) Anssi Koivuranta | (Austria) Stefan Thurnbichler |
| 14 | 2011/12 | 28 December 2011 | (Switzerland) Engelberg | Gross-Titlis-Schanze HS137 | LH | (Norway) Kenneth Gangnes | (Austria) Wolfgang Loitzl |

=== Women ===
| No. | Season | Date | Place | Hill | Size | Winners | |
|---|---|---|---|---|---|---|---|
| 1 | 2006/07 | 6 February 2007 | (Slovenia) Ljubno | Savina HS95 | NH | (Germany) Ulrike Gräßler | (United States) Lindsey Van |
| 2 | 2011/12 | 10 September 2011 | (Norway) Trondheim | Granåsen HS105 | NH | (Austria) Daniela Iraschko | (Austria) Jacqueline Seifriedsberger |
