= 2007 FIS Ski Jumping Grand Prix =

International ski jumping competition

Grand Prix 2007
Winners
- Overall: (Austria) Thomas Morgenstern
- Four Nations GP: (Austria) Thomas Morgenstern
- Nations Cup: Austria

Competitions
- Venues: 8
- Individual: 10
- Team: 1

The 2007 FIS Ski Jumping Grand Prix was the 14th Summer Grand Prix season in ski jumping on plastic. The season began on 11 August 2007 in Hinterzarten, Germany and ended on 6 October 2007 in Klingenthal.

Other competitive circuits this season included the World Cup and Continental Cup.

== Calendar ==
=== Men ===
Num	Season	Date	Place	Hill	Size	Winner	Second	Third	Yellow bib	Ref.
79	1	12 August 2007	(Germany) Hinterzarten	Rothaus-Schanze HS108	NH	(Austria) Thomas Morgenstern	(Poland) Adam Małysz	(Austria) Gregor Schlierenzauer	(Austria) Thomas Morgenstern	
80	2	14 August 2007	(France) Courchevel	Tremplin du Praz HS132	LH	(Norway) Bjørn Einar Romøren	(Poland) Adam Małysz	(Germany) Georg Späth	(Poland) Adam Małysz	
81	3	16 August 2007	(Italy) Pragelato	Trempolino a Monte HS140 (night)	LH	(Austria) Gregor Schlierenzauer	(Austria) Thomas Morgenstern	(Poland) Adam Małysz	(Austria) Thomas Morgenstern (Poland) Adam Małysz	
82	4	18 August 2007	(Switzerland) Einsiedeln	Andreas Küttel Schanze HS117	LH	(Austria) Thomas Morgenstern	(Poland) Adam Małysz	(Slovenia) Jernej Damjan	(Austria) Thomas Morgenstern	
2nd Four-Nations-Grand-Prix Overall (12–18 August 2007)						(Austria) Thomas Morgenstern	(Poland) Adam Małysz	(Austria) Gregor Schlierenzauer		
83	5	24 August 2007	(Poland) Zakopane	Wielka Krokiew HS134 (night)	LH	(Austria) Thomas Morgenstern	(Austria) Wolfgang Loitzl	(Poland) Adam Małysz	(Austria) Thomas Morgenstern	
84	6	25 August 2007	(Poland) Zakopane	Wielka Krokiew HS134 (night)	LH	(Poland) Adam Małysz	(Austria) Thomas Morgenstern	(Austria) Wolfgang Loitzl	(Austria) Thomas Morgenstern	
85	7	8 September 2007	(Japan) Hakuba	Olympic Ski Jumps HS131 (night)	LH	(Switzerland) Andreas Küttel	(Japan) Shōhei Tochimoto	(Japan) Noriaki Kasai	(Austria) Thomas Morgenstern	
86	8	9 September 2007	(Japan) Hakuba	Olympic Ski Jumps HS131	LH	(Japan) Shōhei Tochimoto	(Switzerland) Andreas Küttel	(Japan) Noriaki Kasai	(Austria) Thomas Morgenstern	
87	9	3 October 2007	(Germany) Oberhof	Hans-Renner-Schanze HS140	LH	(Poland) Kamil Stoch	(Slovenia) Jernej Damjan	(Austria) Thomas Morgenstern	(Austria) Thomas Morgenstern	
88	10	6 October 2007	(Germany) Klingenthal	Vogtland Arena HS140	LH	(Austria) Gregor Schlierenzauer	(Russia) Pavel Karelin	(Norway) Anders Jacobsen	(Austria) Thomas Morgenstern	

=== Men's team ===
Num	Season	Date	Place	Hill	Size	Winner	Second	Third	Yellow bib	Ref.
10	1	11 August 2007	(Germany) Hinterzarten	Rothaus-Schanze HS108	NH	Austria Wolfgang Loitzl; Thomas Morgenstern; Andreas Kofler; Gregor Schlierenzauer	Finland Janne Happonen; Harri Olli; Kalle Keituri; Janne Ahonen	Czech Republic Antonín Hájek; Roman Koudelka; Martin Cikl; Jakub Janda	Austria	

== Standings ==
=== Overall ===
Rank	after 10 events	Points
1	(Austria) Thomas Morgenstern	569
2	(Poland) Adam Małysz	460
3	(Austria) Gregor Schlierenzauer	417
4	(Switzerland) Andreas Küttel	362
5	(Slovenia) Jernej Damjan	302

=== Nations Cup ===
Rank	after 11 events	Points
1	Austria	2159
2	Poland	990
3	Germany	901
4	Switzerland	895
5	Japan	866

=== Four Nations Grand Prix ===
Rank	after 4 events	Points
1	(Austria) Thomas Morgenstern	1017.8
2	(Poland) Adam Malysz	1014.7
3	(Austria) Gregor Schlierenzauer	1012.5
4	(Switzerland) Simon Ammann	966.9
5	(Austria) Andreas Kofler	956.2
