= 2007–08 FIS Ski Jumping World Cup =

Ski jumping championship season

2007–08 World Cup
Winners
- Overall: (Austria) Thomas Morgenstern
- Four Hills Tournament: (Finland) Janne Ahonen
- Nordic Tournament: (Austria) Gregor Schlierenzauer
- Nations Cup: Austria

Competitions
- Venues: 17
- Individual: 27
- Team: 3
- Cancelled: 2 (Individual + Team)
- Rescheduled: 5

The 2007–08 FIS Ski Jumping World Cup was the 29th World Cup in ski jumping and the unofficial World Cup season in ski flying with no small crystal globe awarded.

Season began on 1 December 2007 in Kuusamo, and finished on 16 March 2008 in Planica. The season was dominated by Austrian duo Thomas Morgenstern and Gregor Schlierenzauer, both between them won 16 of the 27 individual events. The individual World Cup overall winner was Morgenstern, 4H Tournament won Janne Ahonen and Nordic Tournament won Schlierenzauer. Nations Cup was taken by Team of Austria. Adam Małysz had a disappointing season

27 men's individual events on 17 different venues in 10 countries were held in Europe in Asia. With many problems due to weather this season schedule changed a lot. Five individual events were rescheduled (and 1 cancelled). Also 3 men's team events held (and 1 cancelled).

e.on Ruhrgas was this and previous season's main sponsor, and therefore, this season's leader's overall jersey was red, in reference to the company, rather than the traditional yellow.

Peaks of the season were FIS Ski Flying World Championships, 4H and Nordic Tournament.

== Map of world cup hosts ==
Europe
| Germany | Austria | Asia |

== Calendar ==
=== Men's Individual ===
N – normal hill / L – large hill / F – flying hill
| All | No. | Date | Place (Hill) | Size | Winner | Second | Third | Overall leader (Note: Red bib in colors of main sponsor e.on Ruhrgas (instead of yellow) was exceptionally in use for overall leader in 2006/07 and 2007/08 seasons.) | R. |
|---|---|---|---|---|---|---|---|---|---|
| 656 | 1 | 1 December 2007 | (Finland) Kuusamo (Rukatunturi HS142) | L _{450} | (Austria) Thomas Morgenstern | (Norway) Bjørn Einar Romøren | (Norway) Tom Hilde | (Austria) Thomas Morgenstern | |
| 657 | 2 | 8 December 2007 | (Norway) Trondheim (Granåsen HS131) | L _{451} | (Austria) Thomas Morgenstern | (Austria) Gregor Schlierenzauer | (Norway) Tom Hilde | (Austria) Thomas Morgenstern | |
| 658 | 3 | 9 December 2007 | (Norway) Trondheim (Granåsen HS131) | L _{452} | (Austria) Thomas Morgenstern | (Austria) Andreas Kofler | (Austria) Wolfgang Loitzl | (Austria) Thomas Morgenstern | |
| 659 | 4 | (Note: Cancelled event from Kranj (16 December) was rescheduled to Villach (13 December).)13 December 2007 | (Austria) Villach (Villacher Alpenarena HS98) | N _{141} | (Austria) Thomas Morgenstern | (Finland) Janne Ahonen | (Austria) Gregor Schlierenzauer | (Austria) Thomas Morgenstern | |
| 660 | 5 | 14 December 2007 | (Austria) Villach (Villacher Alpenarena HS98) | N _{142} | (Austria) Thomas Morgenstern | (Austria) Gregor Schlierenzauer | (Finland) Janne Ahonen | (Austria) Thomas Morgenstern | |
| | | 16 December 2007 | (Slovenia) Kranj (Bauhenk HS109) | N _{cnx} | cancelled due to lack of snow (rescheduled to Villach on 13 December) | | | — | |
| 661 | 6 | 22 December 2007 | (Switzerland) Engelberg (Gross-Titlis-Schanze HS137) | L _{453} | (Austria) Thomas Morgenstern | (Austria) Andreas Kofler | (Norway) Tom Hilde | (Austria) Thomas Morgenstern | |
| 662 | 7 | 23 December 2007 | (Switzerland) Engelberg (Gross-Titlis-Schanze HS137) | L _{454} | (Switzerland) Andreas Küttel | (Austria) Gregor Schlierenzauer | (Austria) Thomas Morgenstern | (Austria) Thomas Morgenstern | |
| 663 | 8 | 30 December 2007 | (Germany) Oberstdorf (Schattenberg HS137) | L _{455} | (Austria) Thomas Morgenstern | (Austria) Gregor Schlierenzauer | (Finland) Janne Ahonen | (Austria) Thomas Morgenstern | |
| 664 | 9 | 1 January 2008 | (Germany) Garmisch-Pa (Gr. Olympiaschanze HS140) | L _{456} | (Austria) Gregor Schlierenzauer | (Finland) Janne Ahonen | (Germany) Michael Neumayer | (Austria) Thomas Morgenstern | |
| | | 4 January 2008 | (Austria) Innsbruck (Bergiselschanze HS130) | L _{cnx} | first 4H event in history cancelled due to strong wind (rescheduled to Bischofshofen on 5 January) | | | — | |
| 665 | 10 | (Note: Cancelled event from Innsbruck (4 January) was rescheduled to Bischofshofen (5 January).)5 January 2008 | (Austria) Bischofshofen (Paul-Ausserleitner HS140) | L _{457} | (Finland) Janne Ahonen | (Austria) Thomas Morgenstern | (Switzerland) Simon Ammann | (Austria) Thomas Morgenstern | |
| 666 | 11 | 6 January 2008 | (Austria) Bischofshofen (Paul-Ausserleitner HS140) | L _{458} | (Finland) Janne Ahonen | (Norway) Anders Bardal | (Austria) Thomas Morgenstern | (Austria) Thomas Morgenstern | |
| 56th Four Hills Tournament Overall (30 December 2007 – 6 January 2008) | | | | | (Finland) Janne Ahonen | (Austria) Thomas Morgenstern | (Germany) Michael Neumayer | 4H Tournament | |
| 667 | 12 | 12 January 2008 | (Italy) Val di Fiemme (Trampolino dal Ben HS134) | L _{459} | (Norway) Tom Hilde | (Norway) Sigurd Pettersen | (Austria) Wolfgang Loitzl | (Austria) Thomas Morgenstern | |
| 668 | 13 | 13 January 2008 | (Italy) Val di Fiemme (Trampolino dal Ben HS134) | L _{460} | (Norway) Tom Hilde | (Austria) Thomas Morgenstern | (Norway) Anders Jacobsen | (Austria) Thomas Morgenstern | |
| | | 19 January 2008 | (Czech Republic) Harrachov (Čerťák HS205) | F _{cnx} | cancelled after Ammann's crash from wind and rain (rescheduled on the 20 January as first event) | | | — | |
| 669 | 14 | (Note: Cancelled event from Harrachov (19 January) was rescheduled on the next day (20 January).)20 January 2008 | (Czech Republic) Harrachov (Čerťák HS205) | F _{067} | (Finland) Janne Ahonen | (Norway) Tom Hilde | (Norway) Anders Jacobsen | (Austria) Thomas Morgenstern | |
| | | 20 January 2008 | (Czech Republic) Harrachov (Čerťák HS205) | F _{cnx} | after morning event held, 2nd afternoon event cancelled due to rain | | | — | |
| 670 | 15 | 25 January 2008 | (Poland) Zakopane (Wielka Krokiew HS134) | L _{461} | (Austria) Gregor Schlierenzauer | (Norway) Anders Jacobsen | (Austria) Thomas Morgenstern | (Austria) Thomas Morgenstern | |
| | | 26 January 2008 | (Poland) Zakopane (Wielka Krokiew HS134) | L _{cnx} | cancelled due to strong wind and rescheduled on 27 January | | | — | |
| 671 | 16 | (Note: Cancelled event from Zakopane (26 January) was rescheduled on the next day (27 January).)27 January 2008 | (Poland) Zakopane (Wielka Krokiew HS134) | L _{462} | (Norway) Anders Bardal | (Austria) Thomas Morgenstern | (Switzerland) Simon Ammann | (Austria) Thomas Morgenstern | |
| 672 | 17 | 2 February 2008 | (Japan) Sapporo (Ōkurayama HS134) | L _{463} | (Austria) Thomas Morgenstern | (Finland) Janne Happonen | (Austria) Martin Koch | (Austria) Thomas Morgenstern | |
| 673 | 18 | 3 February 2008 | (Japan) Sapporo (Ōkurayama HS134) | L _{464} | (Austria) Thomas Morgenstern | (Finland) Janne Happonen | (Norway) Anders Bardal | (Austria) Thomas Morgenstern | |
| 674 | 19 | 8 February 2008 | (Czech Republic) Liberec (Ještěd A HS134) | L _{465} | (Austria) Thomas Morgenstern | (Austria) Gregor Schlierenzauer | (Switzerland) Andreas Küttel | (Austria) Thomas Morgenstern | |
| 675 | 20 | 9 February 2008 | (Czech Republic) Liberec (Ještěd A HS134) | L _{466} | (Norway) Anders Jacobsen | (Austria) Gregor Schlierenzauer | (Austria) Martin Koch | (Austria) Thomas Morgenstern | |
| 676 | 21 | 17 February 2008 | (Germany) Willingen (Mühlenkopfschanze HS145) | L _{467} | (Norway) Bjørn Einar Romøren | (Slovenia) Jernej Damjan | (Norway) Anders Bardal | (Austria) Thomas Morgenstern | |
FIS Ski Flying World Championships 2008 (22 – 23 February • (Germany) Oberstdorf)
| | | 2 March 2008 | (Finland) Lahti (Salpausselkä HS130) | L _{cnx} | cancelled due to strong wind (rescheduled on 3 March in Kuopio) | | | — | |
| 677 | 22 | (Note: Cancelled event from Lahti (2 March) was rescheduled to Kuopio (3 March).)3 March 2008 | (Finland) Kuopio (Puijo HS127) | L _{468} | (Finland) Janne Happonen | (Austria) Gregor Schlierenzauer | (Norway) Anders Jacobsen | (Austria) Thomas Morgenstern | |
| 678 | 23 | 4 March 2008 | (Finland) Kuopio (Puijo HS127) | L _{469} | (Finland) Janne Ahonen | (Norway) Anders Bardal | (Norway) Tom Hilde | (Austria) Thomas Morgenstern | |
| 679 | 24 | 7 March 2008 | (Norway) Lillehammer (Lysgårdsbakken HS138) | L _{470} | (Austria) Gregor Schlierenzauer | (Switzerland) Andreas Küttel | (Finland) Janne Happonen | (Austria) Thomas Morgenstern | |
| 680 | 25 | 9 March 2008 | (Norway) Oslo (Holmenkollbakken HS128) | L _{471} | (Austria) Gregor Schlierenzauer | (Norway) Tom Hilde | (Norway) Bjørn Einar Romøren | (Austria) Thomas Morgenstern | |
| 12th Nordic Tournament Overall (3 – 9 March 2008) | | | | | (Austria) Gregor Schlierenzauer | (Norway) Tom Hilde | (Finland) Janne Happonen | Nordic Tournament | |
| 681 | 26 | 14 March 2008 | (Slovenia) Planica (Letalnica b. Gorišek HS215) | F _{068} | (Austria) Gregor Schlierenzauer | (Finland) Janne Ahonen | (Norway) Bjørn Einar Romøren | (Austria) Thomas Morgenstern | |
| 682 | 27 | 16 March 2008 | (Slovenia) Planica (Letalnica b. Gorišek HS215) | F _{069} | (Austria) Gregor Schlierenzauer | (Austria) Martin Koch | (Finland) Janne Happonen | (Austria) Thomas Morgenstern | |
| 29th FIS World Cup Overall (1 December 2007 – 16 March 2008) | | | | | (Austria) Thomas Morgenstern | (Austria) Gregor Schlierenzauer | (Finland) Janne Ahonen | World Cup Overall | |

=== Men's Team ===
| All | No. | Date | Place (Hill) | Size | Winner | Second | Third |
|---|---|---|---|---|---|---|---|
| 37 | 1 | 30 November 2007 | (Finland) Kuusamo (Rukatunturi HS142) | L _{032} | Norway Bjørn Einar Romøren; Tom Hilde; Anders Bardal; Roar Ljøkelsøy | Austria Wolfgang Loitzl; Martin Koch; Gregor Schlierenzauer; Thomas Morgenstern | Finland Matti Hautamäki; Harri Olli; Arttu Lappi; Janne Ahonen |
| 38 | 2 | 16 February 2008 | (Germany) Willingen (Mühlenkopfschanze HS145) | L _{033} | Norway Bjørn E. Romøren; Anders Bardal; Tom Hilde; Anders Jacobsen | Finland Janne Happonen; Harri Olli; Matti Hautamäki; Janne Ahonen | Austria Andreas Kofler; Martin Koch; Gregor Schlierenzauer; Thomas Morgenstern |
| | | 1 March 2008 | (Finland) Lahti (Salpausselkä HS130) | L _{cnx} | cancelled due to weather conditions | | |
| 39 | 3 | 15 March 2008 | (Slovenia) Planica (Letalnica bratov Gorišek HS215) | F _{005} | Norway Tom Hilde; Anders Jacobsen; Anders Bardal; Bjørn Einar Romøren | Finland Janne Happonen; Matti Hautamäki; Jussi Hautamäki; Janne Ahonen | Austria Martin Koch; Thomas Morgenstern; Andreas Kofler; Gregor Schlierenzauer |

== Standings ==
=== Overall ===
| Rank | after 27 events | Points |
|---|---|---|
| 1 | (Austria) Thomas Morgenstern | 1794 |
| 2 | (Austria) Gregor Schlierenzauer | 1561 |
| 3 | (Finland) Janne Ahonen | 1291 |
| 4 | (Norway) Tom Hilde | 1228 |
| 5 | (Norway) Anders Bardal | 942 |
| 6 | (Norway) Anders Jacobsen | 827 |
| 7 | (Switzerland) Andreas Küttel | 778 |
| 8 | (Finland) Janne Happonen | 775 |
| 9 | (Switzerland) Simon Ammann | 728 |
| 10 | (Austria) Wolfgang Loitzl | 715 |

=== Nations Cup ===
| Rank | after 30 events | Points |
|---|---|---|
| 1 | Austria | 6734 |
| 2 | Norway | 5302 |
| 3 | Finland | 3627 |
| 4 | Switzerland | 1752 |
| 5 | Germany | 1688 |
| 6 | Slovenia | 1519 |
| 7 | Russia | 1001 |
| 8 | Japan | 888 |
| 9 | Czech Republic | 820 |
| 10 | Poland | 804 |

=== Prize money ===
| Rank | after 30 events | CHF |
|---|---|---|
| 1 | (Austria) Thomas Morgenstern | 412,950 |
| 2 | (Austria) Gregor Schlierenzauer | 335,950 |
| 3 | (Finland) Janne Ahonen | 236,800 |
| 4 | (Norway) Tom Hilde | 184,900 |
| 5 | (Norway) Anders Bardal | 121,150 |
| 6 | (Norway) Anders Jacobsen | 113,200 |
| 7 | (Norway) Bjørn Einar Romøren | 104,250 |
| 8 | (Finland) Janne Happonen | 101,200 |
| 9 | (Switzerland) Andreas Küttel | 70,000 |
| 10 | (Austria) Wolfgang Loitzl | 55,500 |

=== Four Hills Tournament ===
| Rank | after 4 events | Points |
|---|---|---|
| 1 | (Finland) Janne Ahonen | 1085.8 |
| 2 | (Austria) Thomas Morgenstern | 1066.0 |
| 3 | (Germany) Michael Neumayer | 994.6 |
| 4 | (Poland) Adam Małysz | 979.9 |
| 5 | (Russia) Dmitriy Vassiliev | 977.5 |
| 6 | (Switzerland) Andreas Küttel | 959.3 |
| 7 | (Norway) Anders Bardal | 958.7 |
| 8 | (Germany) Martin Schmitt | 955.9 |
| 9 | (Norway) Anders Jacobsen | 943.2 |
| 10 | (Finland) Janne Happonen | 936.6 |

=== Nordic Tournament ===
| Rank | after 4 events | Points |
|---|---|---|
| 1 | (Austria) Gregor Schlierenzauer | 897.6 |
| 2 | (Norway) Tom Hilde | 878.5 |
| 3 | (Finland) Janne Happonen | 876.8 |
| 4 | (Finland) Janne Ahonen | 855.5 |
| 5 | (Norway) Anders Bardal | 854.0 |
| 6 | (Austria) Thomas Morgenstern | 842.2 |
| 7 | (Austria) Andreas Kofler | 823.1 |
| 8 | (Poland) Adam Małysz | 820.2 |
| 9 | (Norway) Anders Jacobsen | 818.7 |
| 10 | (Austria) Martin Koch | 804.8 |

== See also ==
- 2007 Grand Prix (top level summer series)
- 2007–08 FIS Continental Cup (2nd level competition)
