= Christoph Müller (ski jumper) =

Austrian ski jumper (born 1968)

Personal information
- Born: 1968 (age 57–58)

Sport
- Sport: Skiing

World Cup career
- Indiv. wins: 0
- Updated on 23 December 2007

Christoph Müller (born 1968) is a retired Austrian ski jumper.

In the World Cup he finished once among the top 15, his best result being a twelfth place from Sapporo in January 1987.

He finished third overall in the 1992–1993 Continental Cup.
