= Johan Erikson =

Swedish ski jumper

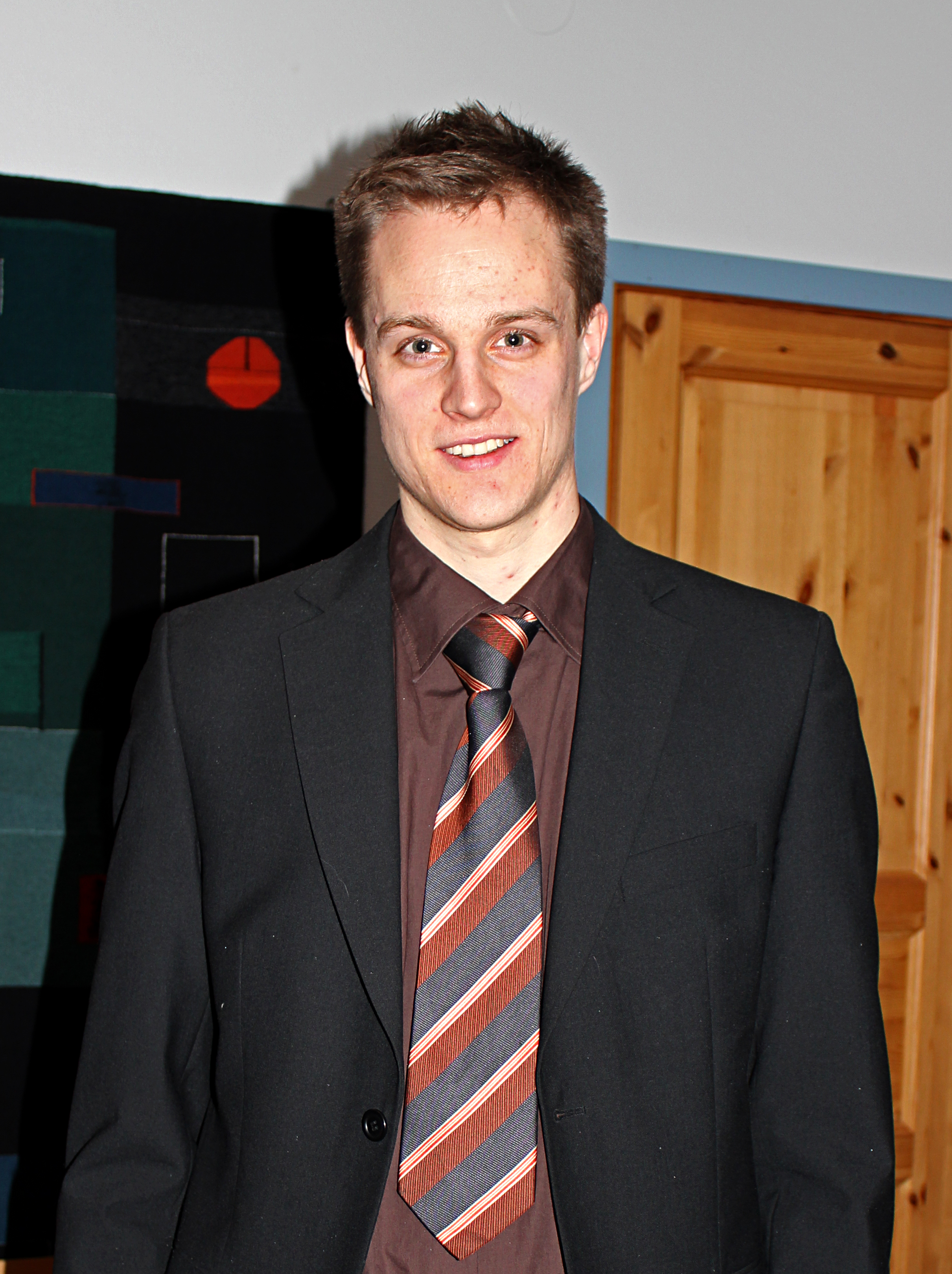
Johan Erikson in 2011

Johan Erikson (born 20 January 1985) is a Swedish ski jumper who represents Holmens IF. He had his best season in 2003/2004, when he finished the season with many top-20 finishes, including a 16th at Liberec in 2004.

Erikson has a characteristic style whereby he travels very quickly, but does not fly especially far. However, he is the Swede with the second-furthest distance of all time, with his 201 metres at Planica in 2007, after Isak Grimholm.
