= Pine Mountain Jump =

Ski jumping hill in Michigan, United States

Coordinates: 45°50′07.34″N 88°05′18.59″W

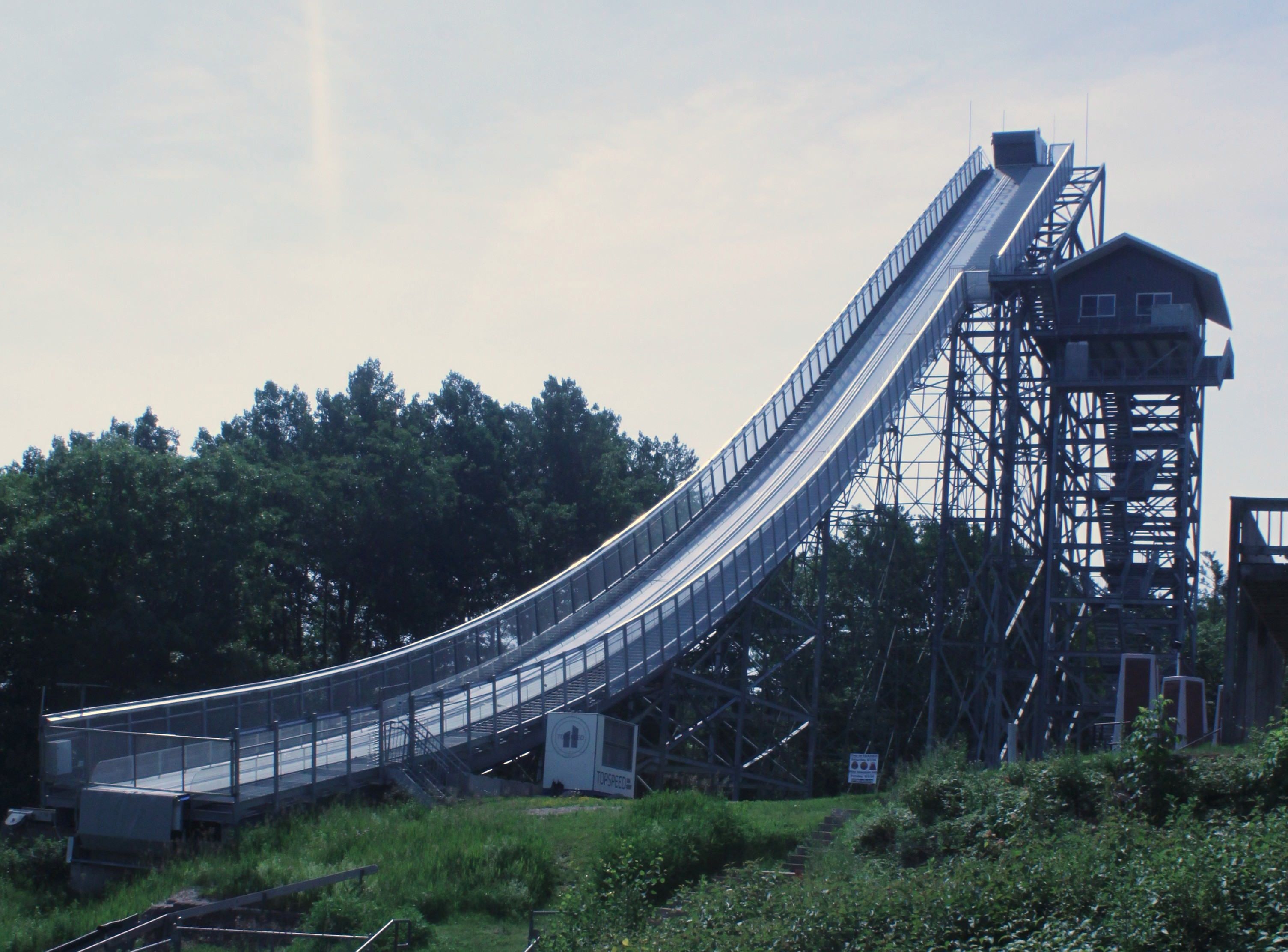
- Location: Pine Mountain; Iron Mountain, MI; United States
- Opened: 1937
- Renovated: 1977

Size
- K–point: K-120
- Hill size: HS133
- Hill record: (Norway) Marius Lindvik (144 m in 2018)

The Pine Mountain Ski Jump is a ski jump located in Iron Mountain, Michigan, Dickinson County. It is part of the Kiwanis Ski Club and hosts annual FIS Ski Jumping Continental Cup competitions. Pine Mountain holds the U.S. records for the longest jump in World Cup competition at 140m (459 feet), as well as the overall distance record at 144m (472.44feet), not counting records set at ski flying hills. The facility also includes two smaller ski jumping hills that are built into the hill northwest of the large hill. Attendance is about 20,000 ski jumping fans year around.

== Specifications ==
- Scaffold height: 176 feet (54 m)
- Scaffold length: 117m
- Length of underhill (end of take-off to outrun): 632 feet (193 m)
- Length of underhill (end of scaffold to end of outrun): 1,032 feet (315 m)
- Critical point (K-point) of landing hill: 394 feet (120 m)
- Hill Size (HS): 133m
- Pitch of landing hill: 39°
- Estimated speed of skiers at takeoff (variable depending on wind and other factors): 55–65 mph (89–105 km/h)

== History ==
Construction of the jump began in 1937 and was completed in 1938. At the time it was 156 feet (48 m) high. It hosted its first competition in 1939. In 1948, the outrun was dug out, and in 1977 the inrun tower was made larger (to the current 176 feet (54 m)) after a fire. There have been numerous other renovations over the years. In 1996 and 2000 the hill hosted the FIS Ski Jumping World Cup, bringing in 20,000 spectators. However, it has not hosted one since, and now hosts annual FIS Ski Jumping Continental Cup competitions.

Locally known as "Giant Pine Mountain," it is reputed worldwide to be one of the best ski jumping facilities. The ski jumping fans are said to be friendly. It is also considered by most jumpers as the most challenging jump on the Continental Cup circuit and in the world. This partly is due to the fact that the top of the jump is nearly 600 feet above all of the surrounding landscape giving the jumpers the same view that they would have if they were standing on top of a 60 story skyscraper. Also, because of the jump and hill's high rise above the surrounding landscape there is a significant wind factor for jumpers making it more challenging.

Excluding ski flying hills, the Pine Mountain Ski Jump is the largest ski jump in the United States and it is between the 3rd and 8th tallest man-made ski jump in the world (depending on how height is measured). There are two other ski jumps in the Upper Peninsula of Michigan: Copper Peak is the only Ski flying venue in the western hemisphere, located near Ironwood, Michigan (and has been called "Suicide hill"), as well as the pre-existing Suicide Hill Ski Jump located at Ishpeming, Michigan, which is near the National Ski Hall of Fame.

== Jump records ==
Below is the list of past and current record holders:

Year	Distance (m)	Distance (ft)	Name	Country
1939	78	256	Bob Rocker	United States
1941	81.5	267	Alf Engen	(Norway) NOR
1942	88	289	Torger Tokle	(Norway) NOR
1949	89	292	Joe Perrault	United States
1949	89.5	294	Matti Pietikäinen	(Finland) FIN
1949	90.5	297	Joe Perrault	(United States) USA
1955	91.5	300	Rudy Maki	(United States) USA
1961	96	315	Jim Brennan	(United States) USA
1962	96.5	317	Pekka Tirkkinen	(Finland) FIN
1965	99	325	John Balfanz	United States
1968	102	335	Adrian Watt	United States
1971	105	344	Jerry Martin	United States
1978	113	371	Gebhart Aberer	(Austria) AUT
1980	121.5	399	Armin Kogler	(Austria) AUT
1991	122	400	Werner Schuster	(Austria) AUT
1996-02-18	131.5	431	Masahiko Harada	(Japan) JPN
2018-02-18	138	453	Jakub Wolny	(Poland) POL
2017-02-18	140.5	461	Klemens Murańka	(Poland) POL
2002-02-23	142	466	Kalle Keituri	(Finland) FIN
2004-02-21	142	466	Olav Magne Dønnem	(Norway) NOR
2006-02-18	142.5	468	Stefan Kaiser	(Austria) AUT
2009-02-15	142.5	468	Lukas Müller	(Austria) AUT
2009-02-15	143.5	471	Stefan Thurnbichler	(Austria) AUT
2018-02-15	144	472	Marius Lindvik	(Norway) NOR

== List of events held ==
The Pine Mountain ski jumping tournament has been part of the FIS Ski Jumping Continental Cup every year since 2004 and with the exception of the occasional Winter Olympic Games or World Cup event, the tournament is annually the most prestigious and highest level ski jumping competition held in the Western Hemisphere. Below is an incomplete list of events held at the hill.

- United States National Ski Jumping Championship held in 1958.
- United States National Ski Jumping Championship held in 1960.
- United States National Ski Jumping Championship held in 1966.
- FIS Ski Jumping World Cup held February 16, 17, 18. and 19, 1996.
- FIS Ski Jumping World Cup held February 25, 26, and 27, 2000.
- FIS Continental Cup held February 16, 17, and 18, 2001.
- FIS Continental Cup held February 22, 23, and 24, 2002.
- FIS Continental Cup held January 20, 21, and 22, 2004.
- FIS Continental Cup held February 25, 26, and 27, 2005.
- FIS Continental Cup held February 17, 18, and 19, 2006.
- FIS Continental Cup held February 16, 17, and 18, 2007.
- FIS Continental Cup held February 15, 16, and 17, 2008.
- FIS Continental Cup held February 13, 14, and 15, 2009.
- FIS Continental Cup held January 29, 30, and 31, 2010
- FIS Continental Cup held February 11, 12, and 13, 2011.
- FIS Continental Cup held February 10, 11, and 12, 2012.
- FIS Continental Cup held February 8, 9, and 10, 2013.
- FIS Continental Cup held February 7, 8, and 9, 2014.
- FIS Continental Cup held February 20, 21, and 22, 2015.
- FIS Continental Cup held February 19, 20, and 21, 2016.
- FIS Continental Cup held February 24, 25, and 26, 2017.
- FIS Continental Cup held February 9, 10, and 11, 2018.
- FIS Continental Cup held February 8, 9, and 10, 2019.
- FIS Continental Cup held February 4, 5, and 6, 2022

== Getting there ==
From US Highway 2 in town (Iron Mountain), turn west onto Kent Street just south of the Chapin Pit, and follow the signs. In about 3/4 mile (1.2 km), look for Upper Pine Mountain Road which winds up to the hilltop. The view from the observation deck at the top of the jump is about 30 miles (48 km). There is no charge to use the observation deck.
