= Martin Cikl =

Czech ski jumper

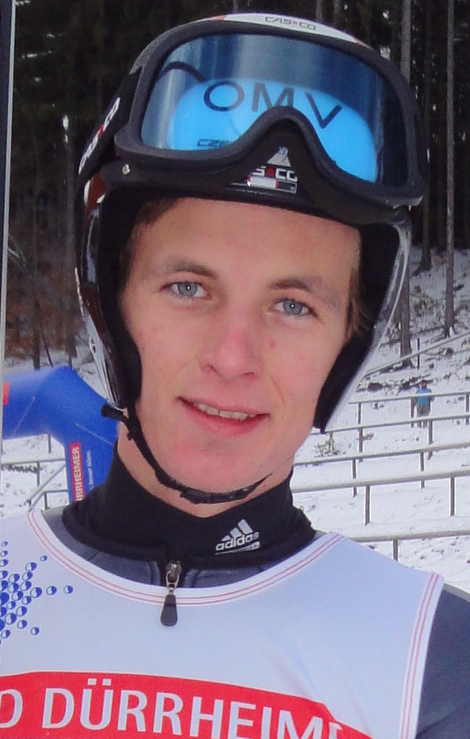
Martin Cikl.

Martin Cikl (born 17 August 1987 in Varnsdorf) is a Czech ski jumper who has competed since 2002. He finished 41st in the individual large hill event at the 2010 Winter Olympics in Vancouver.

Cikl's best World finish was seventh twice both in team large hill events in 2009 while his best individual finish was 19th in an individual large hill event at Switzerland that same year.
