= Marcin Bachleda =

Polish ski jumper

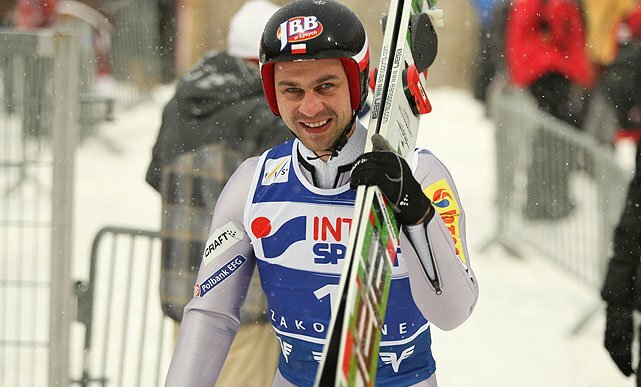

Personal information
- Born: 4 September 1982 (age 44) Zakopane, Poland

Sport
- Sport: Skiing
- Club: TS Wisla Zakopane

World Cup career
- Seasons: 1999–2012

Achievements and titles
- Personal bests: 201.5 m (661 ft); Planica, 18 Mar 2010
Medal record
Men's ski jumping
Representing Poland
Universiade
Silver medal – second place	2009 Harbin	Individual NH
Silver medal – second place	2005 Innsbruck	Team NH
- Updated on 20 February 2014

Marcin Bachleda (born 4 September 1982) is a Polish ski jumper.

He made his World Cup debut in February 2001 in Willingen, and collected his first World Cup points with a 28th place in January 2002 in Zakopane. He has placed once among the top fifteen, with an eleventh place from November 2002 in Kuusamo. He has won five Continental Cup competitions.

He competed at the World Championships in 1999, 2001, 2003 and 2005. He also finished ninth in the large hill at the 2005 Winter Universiade.
