= Stefan Kaiser (ski jumper) =

Austrian ski jumper

Personal information
- Born: 15 February 1983 (age 43)

Sport
- Sport: Skiing
- Club: SV Achomitz

World Cup career
- Seasons: 2000-2004
- Indiv. podiums: 0
- Indiv. wins: 0

Stefan Kaiser (born 15 February 1983) is an Austrian ski jumper.

In the World Cup he finished twice among the top 10, with a seventh place from Oberstdorf in December 2000 as his best result. He finished third overall in the 2003/04 season of the Continental Cup.

He was a record holder of the longest jump at Pine Mountain ski jump.

At the 2005 Winter Universiade he finished 13th in the normal hill and 12th in the large hill. At the 2007 Winter Universiade he finished 10th in the normal hill and 8th in the large hill.
