= Breitenberg, Lower Bavaria =

Breitenberg
- Municipality
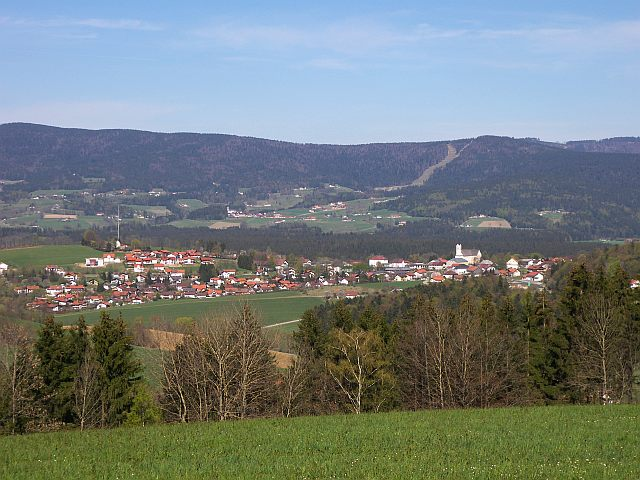
- General view of Breitenberg

- Coat of arms

- Location of Breitenberg within Passau district
- Interactive map of Breitenberg
- Location within Germany Location within Bavaria
- Coordinates: 48°42′N 13°48′E
- Country: Germany
- State: Bavaria
- Admin. region: Niederbayern
- District: Passau

Government
  - Mayor (2020–26): Adolf Barth

Area
  - Total: 29.84 km^{2} (11.52 sq mi)
- Elevation: 695 m (2,280 ft)

Population (2025-12-31)
  - Total: 1,972
  - Density: 66.09/km^{2} (171.2/sq mi)
- Time zone: UTC+01:00 (CET)
  - Summer (DST): UTC+02:00 (CEST)
- Postal codes: 94139
- Dialling codes: 08584
- Vehicle registration: PA
- Website: www.breitenberg.de

Breitenberg (German pronunciation: [ˈbʁaɪtn̩bɛʁk]) is a municipality in the district of Passau in Bavaria in Germany. It lies on the border with Austria, and is the easternmost municipality of Bavaria.
