= Lindsey Van =

American former ski jumper (born 1984)

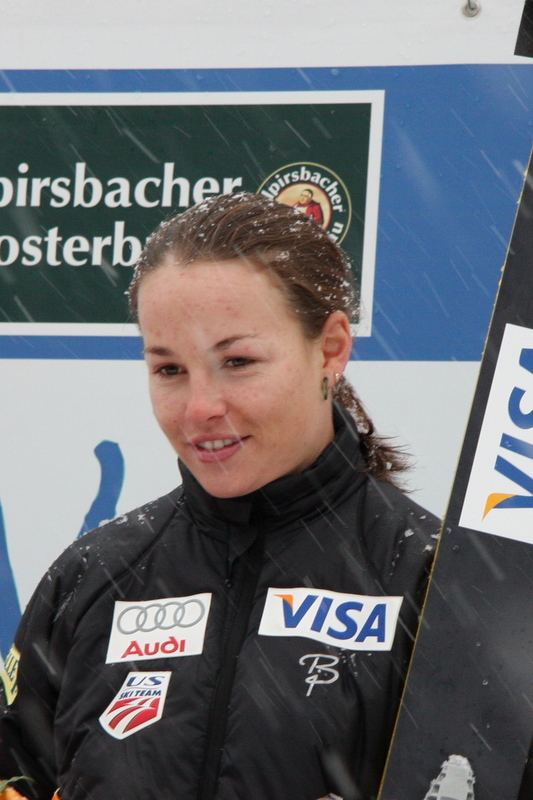

Medal record

Women's ski jumping

Representing the United States

World Championships
Gold medal – first place	2009 Liberec	Individual normal hill

Lindsey Marie Van (born November 27, 1984) is an American former ski jumper who won her first of 13 U.S. National Ski Jumping Championships in 1998 and competed in her first FIS event in 2002. Van won a gold medal in the inaugural women's ski jumping event at the FIS Nordic World Ski Championships 2009 in Liberec and has a total of eight Continental Cup victories in her career.

In 2008, Van's knee cartilage was crushed on the landing of a practice jump; she underwent knee surgery and five months of intense rehab. She returned to competition after six months but injured her knee again. Van has experienced four knee surgeries and a ruptured spleen.

Van was a plaintiff in a lawsuit against the organizers of the 2010 Winter Olympics; she and other female ski jumpers claimed that their rights were violated because only male ski jumpers were permitted to compete in the Vancouver Olympics. The appeal was unsuccessful. Van characterized the Canadian legal system as "weak" and said the International Olympic Committee were "like the Taliban of the Olympics."

Going into the Vancouver 2010 Games, Van held the K95 hill record of 105.5 meters at the site of the 2010 Olympic ski jumping events. This mark was surpassed several times at the 2010 Olympic Games and is now held by Simon Ammann with a jump of 108.0 meters.

In 2011, it was announced that women's ski jumping on the normal hill would be included in the 2014 Winter Olympics. Van said, "I was kind of numb when I heard. People expected me to be ecstatic, but I'd been after this for so long, it just didn't sink in at first."

In July 2011, nerve tissues in one of her legs became a problem.

On the appeal of her sport, Van has said, "You are up the in the air and for a minute it's as if you can fly. It's a feeling like nothing else I've ever felt, and as soon as I land, I just want to go back up to the top and do it again."
