= Janne Happonen =

Finnish ski jumper

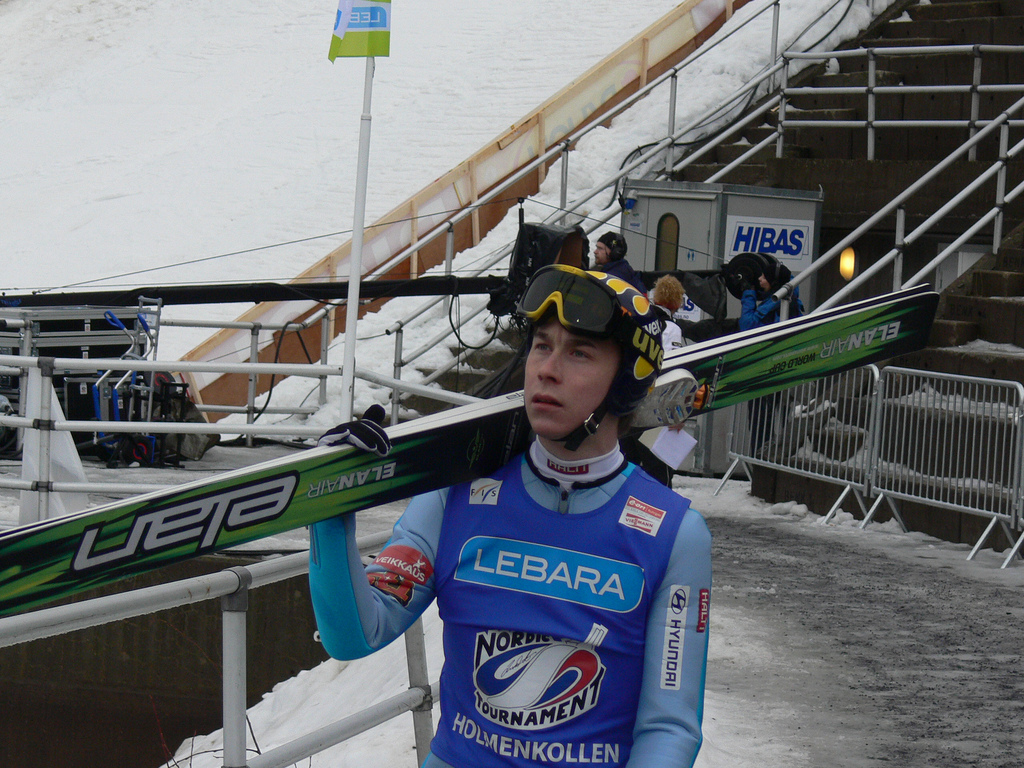
- Happonen in Oslo, 2008

Personal information
- Full name: Janne Mikael Happonen
- Nationality: Finland
- Born: 18 June 1984 (age 42) Kuopio, Finland
- Height: 1.79 m (5 ft 10 in)

Sport
- Sport: Skiing

World Cup career
- Seasons: 2002–2008; 2010–2014
- Indiv. starts: 129
- Indiv. podiums: 7
- Indiv. wins: 3
- Team starts: 16
- Team podiums: 4
- Team wins: 1

Achievements and titles
- Personal bests: 240 m (790 ft); Vikersund, 13 February 2011
Medal record
Men's ski jumping
Olympic Games
Silver medal – second place	2006 Turin	Team LH
Men's ski flying
World Championships
Silver medal – second place	2006 Bad Mitterndorf	Team
Silver medal – second place	2008 Oberstdorf	Team
Bronze medal – third place	2010 Planica	Team
- Updated on 14 February 2016

Janne Mikael Happonen (born 18 June 1984) is a Finnish former ski jumper who competed from 2001 to 2014, representing Puijo Ski Club.

== Career ==
Happonen made his World Cup debut on 23 November 2001 in Kuopio, finishing an impressive eleventh in the individual large hill competition. Five years later he scored his first World Cup win on 5 March 2006, in a team competition in Willingen. This was followed up exactly a month later on 5 March, when Happonen won his first individual competition on the large hill in Lahti. Another individual win was achieved on 19 March at the ski flying hill in Planica. Happonen scored his third individual win on 3 March 2008 in Kuopio.

In 2006, Happonen won a silver medal in the team large hill competition at the 2006 Winter Olympics in Pragelato. He has also won three medals in the Ski Flying World Championships (silver in 2006 and 2008, bronze in 2010).

Happonen was one of five Finns that travelled to Vancouver for the 2010 Winter Olympics. He participated in all three competitions at Whistler Olympic Park, producing good efforts in the normal hill and large hill competitions, although he was disqualified from the latter due to a suit violation. In the team large hill competition, Happonen produced an excellent jump of 139 metres (456 ft) in the second round, receiving judges' style points of 19 and 19.5, but this was not enough to earn the Finnish team a bronze medal.

== World Cup ==
=== Standings ===
Season	Overall	4H	SF	NT
2001/02	46	—	N/A	19
2002/03	40	—	N/A	20
2003/04	50	58	N/A	26
2004/05	56	—	N/A	36
2005/06	14	26	N/A	3rd place, bronze medalist(s)
2006/07	41	33	N/A	64
2007/08	8	10	N/A	3rd place, bronze medalist(s)
2009/10	49	—	37	28
2010/11	32	—	22	N/A
2011/12	31	38	31	N/A
2012/13	66	—	—	N/A
2013/14	76	—	—	N/A

=== Wins ===
No.	Season	Date	Location	Hill	Size
1	2005/06	5 March 2006	(Finland) Lahti	Salpausselkä HS130	LH
2	2005/06	19 March 2006	(Slovenia) Planica	Letalnica bratov Gorišek HS215	FH
3	2007/08	3 March 2008	(Finland) Kuopio	Puijo HS127 (night)	LH
