= Primož Pikl =

Slovenian ski jumper

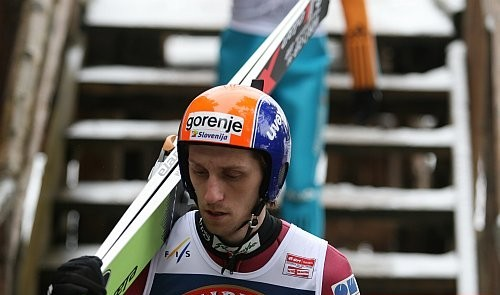

Personal information
- Full name: Primož Pikl
- Nickname: Piki
- Born: 25 August 1982 (age 43) Celje, SR Slovenia, SFR Yugoslavia
- Height: 179 cm (5 ft 10 in)

Sport
- Sport: Skiing
- Club: SSK Ljubno BTC

World Cup career
- Seasons: 2003–2013
- Indiv. podiums: 0
- Indiv. wins: 0

Achievements and titles
- Personal best: 208 m

Primož Pikl (born 25 August 1982) is a Slovenian former ski jumper who competed from 2002 to 2013. At the 2010 Winter Olympics in Vancouver, he finished eighth in the team large hill and 24th in the individual normal hill events.

At the FIS Nordic World Ski Championships 2007 in Sapporo, Pikl finished tenth in the team large hill, 32nd in the individual normal hill, and 34th in the individual large hill events.

His best World Cup finish was fourth in the team large hill events three times, earning them in 2007, 2008 and 2009.
