= Anette Sagen =

Norwegian former ski jumper (born 1985)

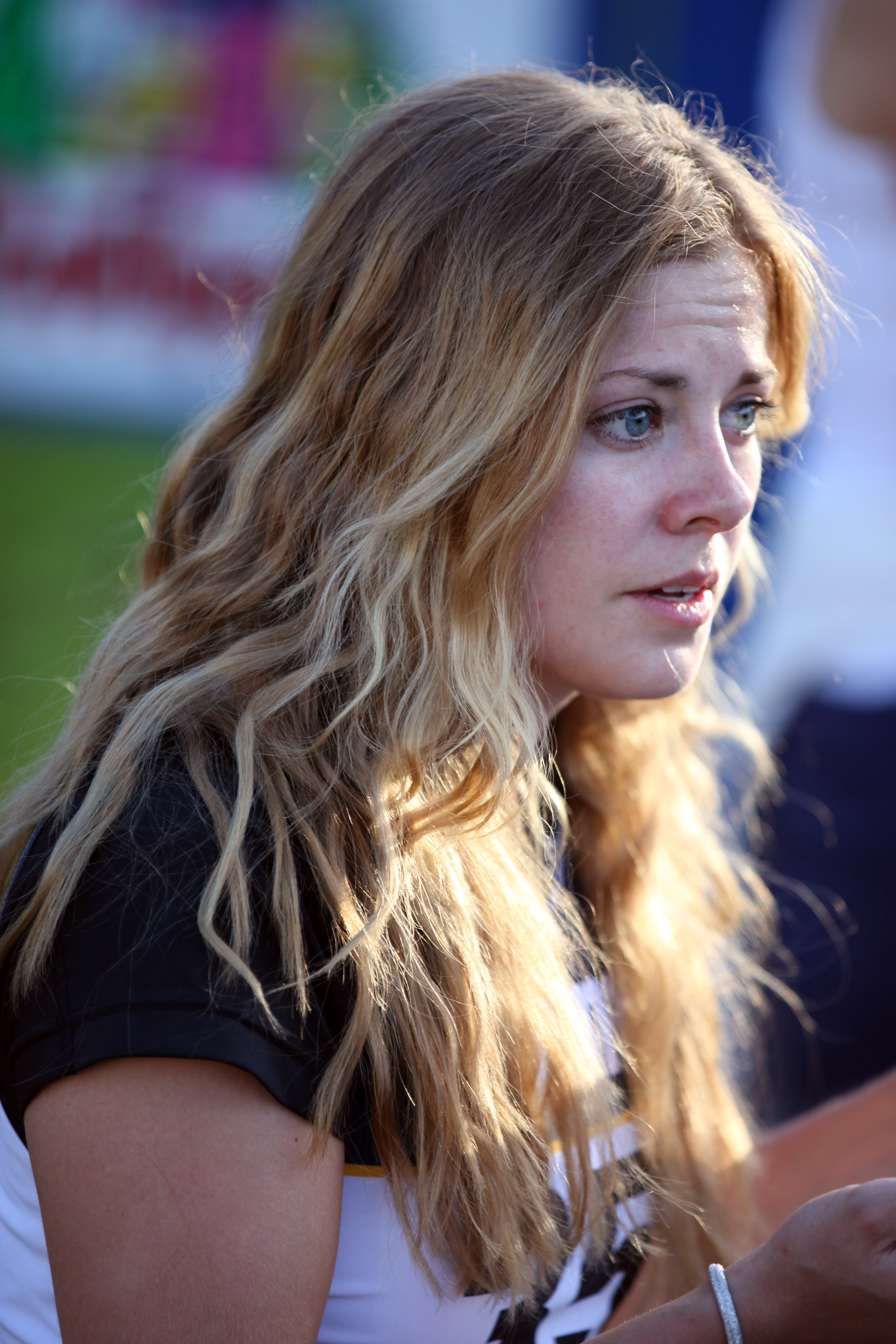

Personal information
- Nationality: Norway
- Born: 10 January 1985 (age 41) Mosjøen, Norway
- Height: 1.63 m (5 ft 4 in)

Sport
- Sport: Skiing

World Cup career
- Seasons: 2012–2015
- Indiv. starts: 37
- Indiv. podiums: 7
- Indiv. wins: 1
- Team starts: 2
- Team podiums: 2
- Team wins: 1

Achievements and titles
- Personal bests: 174.5 m (573 ft); Vikersund, Mar 2004
Medal record
Ladies' ski jumping
FIS Nordic World Ski Championships
Bronze medal – third place	2009 Liberec	Individual NH
- Updated on 17 Jan 2016

Anette Sagen (born 10 January 1985) is a Norwegian former ski jumper.

== Career ==
She is one of the best female jumpers of all time. She received a lot of media attention in 2004, when she was denied the opportunity to jump K-185 in Vikersund, in spite of her good results. The struggle was over whether the quality of female ski jumpers was high enough to allow women to jump in these venues. Torbjørn Yggeseth, the chairman of the ski jump committee of the International Ski Federation, was Sagen's main opponent. The debate soon developed into a struggle over women's rights in the world of sports.

Competing since 2003, Sagen won the women's ski jumping event at the Holmenkollen ski festival in 2004 and 2005, the last two years the event was held. She also has forty additional victories as of 2009.

On 20 February 2009 Sagen won the bronze medal in the first ever World Championship ski jumping competition for women.

After a plebiscite and the decision by the city council in Oslo, Sagen received the honour of being the de jure first ski jumper in the new Holmenkollen.

== World Cup ==
=== Standings ===
Season	Overall
2011/12	6
2012/13	5
2013/14	40
2014/15	38

=== Wins ===
No.	Season	Date	Location	Hill	Size
1	2012/13	6 January 2013	(Germany) Schonach	Langenwaldschanze HS106	NH
