= Bastian Kaltenböck =

Austrian ski jumper

Bastian Kaltenböck (born 23 July 1983 in Hallein, Austria) is a ski jumper from Austria. Kaltenböck competed in the Ski jumping World Cup between 2003 and 2009. He also has nine individual Continental Cup-wins.

In the 2010 Winter Olympics Kaltenböck ended his career as a trialjumper.

The new bindings system, first used by Simon Ammann was Kaltenböck's idea.
