= Balthasar Schneider =

Austrian ski jumper

Balthasar Schneider (born 27 November 1984, in Egg ) is an Austrian ski jumper who won the Ski jumping Continental Cup in 2006-07. Schneider has competed in the World Cup forty times. He debuted in Innsbruck 2009 as a member of the National team. His best individual placement in the World cup is a 12th place in Oslo, Holmenkollen 2007. He has two silver medals from team competitions in the Junior World championships.
