= Stefan Thurnbichler =

Austrian ski jumper

Personal information
- Nationality: Austria
- Born: 2 March 1984 (age 42) Innsbruck, Austria

Sport
- Sport: Skiing

World Cup career
- Seasons: 2002–2011
- Team podiums: 2

Achievements and titles
- Personal bests: 224 m (735 ft); Planica, 20 Mar 2003

Stefan Thurnbichler (born 2 March 1984) is an Austrian former ski jumper who competed from 2000 to 2011. He won the Continental Cup three times, but was not a regular competitor at World Cup level. On 20 Mar 2003 in Planica, Thurnbichler achieved a personal best jump of 224 metres, only a metre short of the world record at the time. In 2009 he was part of the Austrian team in the World Cup and often placed in the top 10.
