= 2004–05 Four Hills Tournament =

Ski jumping competition

Four Hills Tournament at the 2004-05 FIS Ski Jumping World Cup
- Venues: Schattenbergschanze, Große Olympiaschanze, Bergiselschanze, Paul-Ausserleitner-Schanze
- Location: Germany, Austria
- Dates: 28 December 2004 – 6 January 2005
- Competitors: 93 from 20 nations

Medalists
| gold medal | (Finland) Janne Ahonen |
| silver medal | (Austria) Martin Höllwarth |
| bronze medal | (Austria) Thomas Morgenstern |

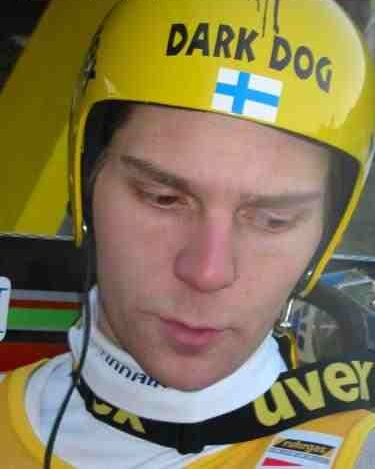
Finishing almost 50 points ahead of runners-up Martin Höllwarth, the third out of Janne Ahonen's five Four Hills victories was the most distinct.

The 53rd edition of the annual Four Hills Tournament was held in the traditional venues: Oberstorf and Garmisch-Partenkirchen in Germany, and Innsbruck and Bischofshofen in Austria.

The Four Hills tournament counts as part of the World Cup season. Before the competition in Oberstorf, eight out of twenty-eight events were already held. Janne Ahonen had won seven of them, and placed second in the only one he did not. This early-season dominance of the Finnish athlete, who had already won the Four Hills tournament twice before, made him the favourite for the title, and Ahonen did not disappoint. He won the first three events, though he failed to become the second ski jumper after Sven Hannawald to win all four events of the tournament when runners-up Martin Höllwarth snatched the victory at the final event in Bischofshofen.

== Format ==
At each of the four events, a qualification round would be held. The 50 best jumpers would qualify for the competition. The fifteen athletes leading the World Cup at the time would qualify automatically. In case of an omitted qualification or a result that would normally result in elimination, they would instead qualify as 50th.

Unlike the procedure at normal World Cup events, the 50 qualified athletes would be paired up for the first round of the final event, with the winner qualifying for the second round. The rounds start with the duel between #26 and #25 from the qualification round, followed by #27 vs #24, up to #50 vs #1. The five best duel losers, so-called 'Lucky Losers' also qualify for the second round.

For the tournament ranking, the total points earned from each jump are added together. The World Cup points collected during the four events are disregarded in this ranking.

== World Cup Standings ==
The standings at the time of the tournament, after seven out of twenty-two events, were as follows:

| Rank | Name | Points |
|---|---|---|
| 1. | (Finland) Janne Ahonen | 780 |
| 2. | (Czech Republic) Jakub Janda | 448 |
| 3. | (Austria) Martin Höllwarth | 397 |
| 4. | (Norway) Roar Ljøkelsøy | 379 |
| 5. | (Austria) Thomas Morgenstern | 328 |
| 6. | (Finland) Matti Hautamäki | 323 |
| 7. | (Austria) Andreas Widhölzl | 298 |
| 8. | (Poland) Adam Małysz | 277 |
| 9. | (Japan) Noriaki Kasai | 228 |
| 10. | (Germany) Alexander Herr | 218 |

== Participating nations and athletes ==
The number of athletes a nation was allowed to nominate was dependent on previous results. In addition, a "national group" from the host nation is added to each event.

The defending champion was Sigurd Pettersen. Six other competitors had also previously won the Four Hills tournament: Andreas Goldberger in 1992-93 and 1994–95, Janne Ahonen in 1998-99 and 2002–03, Primož Peterka in 1996-97, Kazuyoshi Funaki in 1997-98, Andreas Widhölzl in 1999-00 and Adam Małysz in 2000-01.

The following athletes were nominated:

| Nation | Starting Spots | Number of Athletes | Athletes |
|---|---|---|---|
| Germany | 8 + 8 | 16 | Alexander Herr, Georg Spaeth, Michael Uhrmann, Jörg Ritzerfeld, Michael Neumayer, Stephan Hocke, Maximilian Mechler, Martin Schmitt; National Group: Andreas Wank, Christian Bruder, Ferdinand Bader, Stefan Pieper, Kai Bracht, Julian Musiol, Mark Krauspenhaar, Hans Petrat |
| Austria | 8 + 8 | 16 | Martin Höllwarth, Thomas Morgenstern, Andreas Widhölzl, Wolfgang Loitzl, Andreas Goldberger, Florian Liegl, Andreas Kofler, Balthasar Schneiderbr />National Group: Stefan Kaiser, Reinhard Schwarzenberger, Martin Koch, Roland Müller, Mathias Hafele, Stefan Thurnbichler, Manuel Fettner, Christian Nagiller |
| Belarus | 2 | 2 | Maksim Anisimov, Petr Chaadaev |
| China | 2 | 3 | Tian Zhandong, Li Yang (Oberstorf and Innsbruck only), Wang Jianxun (Bischofshofen only) |
| Czech Republic | 4 | 5 | Jakub Janda, Jan Mazoch, Jan Matura, Michal Doležal (until Garmisch-Partenkirchen), Antonin Hajek (Innsbruck onward) |
| Estonia | 2 | 2 | Jaan Jüris, Jens Salumäe |
| Finland | 5 | 5 | Janne Ahonen, Matti Hautamäki, Tami Kiuru, Veli-Matti Lindström, Risto Jussilainen |
| France | 3 | 3 | David Lazzaroni, Emmanuel Chedal (Garmisch-Partenkirchen onward), Nicolas Dessum (Garmisch-Partenkirchen onward) |
| Japan | 6 | 6 | Noriaki Kasai, Daiki Itō, Hideharu Miyahira, Kazuyoshi Funaki, Akira Higashi, Kazuya Yoshioka |
| Kazakhstan | 2 | 2 | Asan Tahtahunov, Radik Zhaparov |
| Netherlands | 1 | 1 | Boy van Baarle (Innsbruck onward) |
| Norway | 8 | 8 | Roar Ljøkelsøy, Lars Bystøl, Bjørn Einar Romøren, Henning Stensrud, Sigurd Pettersen, Tommy Ingebrigtsen, Daniel Forfang, Morten Solem |
| Poland | 3 | 4 | Adam Małysz, Robert Mateja, Krystian Długopolski (until Innsbruck), Stefan Hula (Bischofshofen only) |
| Russia | 2 | 3 | Dimitry Vassiliev, Ildar Fatchullin (until Garmisch-Partenkirchen), Dimitry Ipatov (Innsbruck onward) |
| Slovakia | 1 | 1 | Martin Mesík |
| Slovenia | 5 | 6 | Jernej Damjan, Rok Benkovič, Peter Žonta, Primož Peterka, Robert Kranjec (until Innsbruck), Bine Zupan (only Bischofshofen) |
| South Korea | 2 | 2 | Kang Chil-ku (Innsbruck onward), Kim Hyun-ki (Innsbruck onward) |
| Sweden | 2 | 2 | Johan Erikson, Isak Grimholm (Innsbruck onward) |
| Switzerland | 4 | 4 | Simon Ammann, Michael Möllinger, Andreas Küttel, Marco Steinauer (Oberstorf only) |
| United States | 2 | 2 | Clint Jones, Alan Alborn |

== Results ==
=== Oberstorf ===
(Germany) Schattenbergschanze, Oberstorf
28-29 December 2004

Defending champion Sigurd Pettersen was not among the fifteen pre-qualified jumpers, and only placed 63rd in the qualification round. Thus, he failed to qualify.

In the final event, Roar Ljøkelsøy's jump over 140.0 meters catapulted him from 18th place after the first round onto 2nd place overall.

Qualification winner: (Finland) Janne Ahonen

| Rank | Name | Points |
|---|---|---|
| 1 | (Finland) Janne Ahonen | 268.4 |
| 2 | (Norway) Roar Ljøkelsøy | 258.8 |
| 3 | (Poland) Adam Małysz | 253.8 |
| 4 | (Japan) Daiki Itō | 247.5 |
| 5 | (Austria) Martin Höllwarth | 245.7 |
| 6 | (Finland) Matti Hautamäki | 244.7 |
| 7 | (Slovenia) Jernej Damjan | 243.1 |
| 8 | (Germany) Michael Uhrmann | 242.7 |
| 9 | (Czech Republic) Jakub Janda | 242.0 |
| 10 | (Russia) Dmitri Vassiliev | 239.9 |

=== Garmisch-Partenkirchen ===
(Germany) Große Olympiaschanze, Garmisch-Partenkirchen
31 December 2004 - 1 January 2005

Qualification winner: (Finland) Janne Ahonen

| Rank | Name | Points |
|---|---|---|
| 1 | (Finland) Janne Ahonen | 260.1 |
| 2 | (Austria) Thomas Morgenstern | 254.1 |
| 3 | (Germany) Georg Spaeth | 247.2 |
| 4 | (Austria) Martin Höllwarth | 243.0 |
| 5 | (Germany) Michael Uhrmann | 236.6 |
| 6 | (Czech Republic) Jakub Janda | 233.1 |
| 7 | (Norway) Roar Ljøkelsøy | 232.6 |
| 7 | (Poland) Adam Małysz | 232.6 |
| 9 | (Austria) Andreas Widhölzl | 229.5 |
| 10 | (Japan) Daiki Itō | 228.1 |

=== Innsbruck ===
(Austria) Bergiselschanze, Innsbruck
02-3 January 2005

Qualification winner: (Finland) Janne Ahonen

| Rank | Name | Points |
|---|---|---|
| 1 | (Finland) Janne Ahonen | 243.8 |
| 2 | (Poland) Adam Małysz | 236.8 |
| 3 | (Czech Republic) Jakub Janda | 232.5 |
| 4 | (Austria) Thomas Morgenstern | 229.0 |
| 5 | (Austria) Martin Höllwarth | 228.5 |
| 6 | (Austria) Andreas Widhölzl | 227.3 |
| 7 | (Germany) Martin Schmitt | 223.7 |
| 8 | (Germany) Michael Uhrmann | 220.3 |
| 9 | (Japan) Akira Higashi | 219.9 |
| 10 | (Norway) Tommy Ingebrigtsen | 218.5 |

=== Bischofshofen ===
(Austria) Paul-Ausserleitner-Schanze, Bischofshofen
05-6 January 2005

Qualification winner: (Austria) Martin Höllwarth

| Rank | Name | Points |
|---|---|---|
| 1 | (Austria) Martin Höllwarth | 277.0 |
| 2 | (Finland) Janne Ahonen | 271.0 |
| 3 | (Japan) Daiki Itō | 269.5 |
| 4 | (Czech Republic) Jakub Janda | 265.2 |
| 5 | (Austria) Thomas Morgenstern | 263.9 |
| 6 | (Norway) Roar Ljøkelsøy | 262.7 |
| 7 | (Poland) Adam Małysz | 262.1 |
| 8 | (Germany) Georg Spaeth | 256.3 |
| 9 | (Norway) Sigurd Pettersen | 252.1 |
| 10 | (Japan) Noriaki Kasai | 245.9 |

== Final ranking ==
| Rank | Name | Oberstorf | Garmisch-Partenkirchen | Innsbruck | Bischofshofen | Points |
|---|---|---|---|---|---|---|
| 1 | (Finland) Janne Ahonen | 1st | 1st | 1st | 2nd | 1043.3 |
| 2 | (Austria) Martin Höllwarth | 5th | 4th | 5th | 1st | 994.2 |
| 3 | (Austria) Thomas Morgenstern | 11th | 2nd | 4th | 5th | 985.8 |
| 4 | (Poland) Adam Małysz | 3rd | 7th | 2nd | 7th | 985.3 |
| 5 | (Czech Republic) Jakub Janda | 9th | 6th | 3rd | 4th | 972.8 |
| 6 | (Norway) Roar Ljøkelsøy | 2nd | 7th | 13th | 6th | 969.7 |
| 7 | (Japan) Daiki Itō | 4th | 10th | 11th | 3rd | 962.7 |
| 8 | (Germany) Michael Uhrmann | 8th | 5th | 8th | 13th | 939.0 |
| 9 | (Germany) Georg Spaeth | 21st | 3rd | 17th | 8th | 928.5 |
| 10 | (Finland) Matti Hautamäki | 6th | 11th | 19th | 12th | 922.2 |

After failing to qualify in Oberstorf, the defending Four Hills champion, Sigurd Pettersen, ultimately ranked 22nd overall (678.1 points).
