= 2005–06 Four Hills Tournament =

Ski jumping competition

Four Hills Tournament at the 2005-06 FIS Ski Jumping World Cup
- Venues: Schattenbergschanze, Große Olympiaschanze, Bergiselschanze, Paul-Ausserleitner-Schanze
- Location: Germany, Austria
- Dates: 28 December 2005 – 6 January 2006
- Competitors: 100 from 23 nations

Medalists
gold medal	(Finland) Janne Ahonen (Czech Republic) Jakub Janda
bronze medal	(Norway) Roar Ljøkelsøy

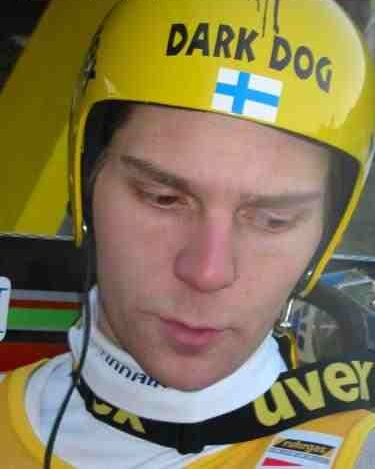
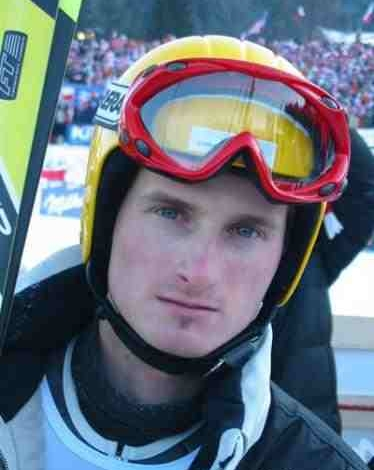
Janne Ahonen and Jakub Janda, the joint winners of the 2005-06 Four Hills Tournament.

The 54th edition of the annual Four Hills Tournament was held in the traditional venues: Oberstorf and Garmisch-Partenkirchen in Germany, and Innsbruck and Bischofshofen in Austria. For the first and only time, the two ski jumpers at the top of the table shared exactly the same number of points after all four events. The competitors in question, Janne Ahonen and Jakub Janda, were both declared tournament winners. For Ahonen, it was the fourth tournament victory, equalizing the record of Jens Weißflog. He would surpass Weißflog and become the lone record holder two years later.

== Format ==
At each of the four events, a qualification round would be held. The 50 best jumpers would qualify for the competition. The fifteen athletes leading the World Cup at the time would qualify automatically. In case of an omitted qualification or a result that would normally result in elimination, they would instead qualify as 50th.

Unlike the procedure at normal World Cup events, the 50 qualified athletes would be paired up for the first round of the final event, with the winner qualifying for the second round. The rounds start with the duel between #26 and #25 from the qualification round, followed by #27 vs #24, up to #50 vs #1. The five best duel losers, so-called 'Lucky Losers' also qualify for the second round.

For the tournament ranking, the total points earned from each jump are added together. The World Cup points collected during the four events are disregarded in this ranking.

== World Cup Standings ==
The events during the Four Hills tournament count as part of the World Cup season. The standings at the time of the tournament, after seven out of twenty-two events, were as follows:

Rank	Name	Points
1.	(Czech Republic) Jakub Janda	552
2.	(Finland) Janne Ahonen	435
3.	(Switzerland) Andreas Küttel	430
4.	(Germany) Michael Uhrmann	367
5.	(Austria) Andreas Widhölzl	254
6.	(Poland) Adam Małysz	240
7.	(Norway) Lars Bystøl	239
8.	(Austria) Thomas Morgenstern	228
9.	(Slovenia) Robert Kranjec	206
10.	(Norway) Roar Ljøkelsøy	180

== Participating nations and athletes ==
The number of athletes a nation was allowed to nominate was dependent on previous results. In addition, a "national group" from the host nation is added to each event.

The defending champion was Janne Ahonen. Four other competitors had also previously won the Four Hills tournament: Primož Peterka in 1996-97, Andreas Widhölzl in 1999-00, Adam Małysz in 2000-01 and Sigurd Pettersen in 2003-04.

The following athletes were nominated:

Nation	Starting Spots	Number of Athletes	Athletes
Germany	6 + 6	13	Michael Uhrmann, Georg Spaeth, Martin Schmitt (until Innsbruck), Michael Neumayer, Alexander Herr, Jörg Ritzerfeld (withdrew in Oberstorf, then replaced), Maximilian Mechler (National Group in Oberstorf, afterwards part of the squad); National Group: Stephan Hocke, Julian Musiol, Andreas Wank, Erik Simon, Kai Bracht, Mario Kürschner (only Garmisch-Partenkirchen)
Austria	8 + 8	16	Andreas Widhölzl, Thomas Morgenstern, Andreas Kofler, Wolfgang Loitzl, Martin Koch, Martin Höllwarth, Balthasar Schneider, Stefan Thurnbichler; National Group: Reinhard Schwarzenberger, Manuel Fettner, Stefan Kaiser, Roland Müller, Bastian Kaltenböck, Gerald Wambacher, Mathias Hafele, Artur Pauli
Belarus	2	2	Maksim Anisimov, Petr Chaadaev
Bulgaria	2	2	Petar Fartunov, Georgi Zharkov
Canada	1	1	Stefan Read
China	2	2	Tian Zhandong, Li Yang
Czech Republic	4	5	Jakub Janda, Jan Matura, Antonin Hajek, Jan Mazoch (until Garmisch-Partenkirchen), Ondřej Vaculík (Innsbruck onward)
Estonia	2	2	Jens Salumäe, Jaan Jüris (Innsbruck onward)
Finland	7	7	Janne Ahonen, Matti Hautamäki, Janne Happonen, Risto Jussilainen (until Garmisch-Partenkirchen, not replaced), Joonas Ikonen, Tami Kiuru, Harri Olli
France	3	3	David Lazzaroni, Emmanuel Chedal (Garmisch-Partenkirchen onward), Vincent Descombes (Garmisch-Partenkirchen onward)
Italy	2	2	Sebastian Colloredo, Andrea Morassi
Japan	6	6	Takanobu Okabe, Noriaki Kasai, Daiki Itō, Tsuyoshi Ichinohe, Hideharu Miyahira, Hiroki Yamada
Kazakhstan	2	2	Ivan Karaulov, Nikolay Karpenko
Norway	6	8	Lars Bystøl, Roar Ljøkelsøy, Daniel Forfang (until Garmisch-Partenkirchen), Tommy Ingebrigtsen, Bjørn Einar Romøren, Sigurd Pettersen (until Garmisch-Partenkirchen), Henning Stensrud (Innsbruck onward), Anders Bardal (Innsbruck onward)
Poland	4	6	Adam Małysz (until Garmisch-Partenkirchen), Kamil Stoch, Robert Mateja, Marcin Bachleda (until Garmisch-Partenkirchen), Stefan Hula (Innsbruck onward), Rafał Śliż (Innsbruck onward)
Russia	4	4	Dimitry Vassiliev, Denis Kornilov, Dimitry Ipatov, Ildar Fatchullin
Slovakia	1	1	Martin Mesík
Slovenia	5	6	Robert Kranjec, Primož Peterka, Rok Benkovič, Jernej Damjan (until Innsbruck), Jurij Tepeš, Primož Pikl (only Bischofshofen)
South Korea	2	3	Choi Heung-chul, Choi Yong-jik (until Garmisch-Partenkirchen), Kim Hyun-ki (Innsbruck onward)
Sweden	2	3	Isak Grimholm, Johan Erikson (until Garmisch-Partenkirchen), Jakob Grimholm (Innsbruck onward)
Switzerland	4	4	Andreas Küttel, Simon Ammann, Michael Möllinger, Guido Landert (Innsbruck onward)
Ukraine	1	1	Volodymyr Boschuk (until Garmisch-Partenkirchen)
United States	1	1	Alan Alborn (only Bischofshofen)

== Results ==
=== Oberstorf ===
(Germany) Schattenbergschanze, Oberstorf
28-29 December 2005

Qualification winner: (Austria) Andreas Widhölzl

Rank	Name	Points
1	(Finland) Janne Ahonen	270.9
2	(Norway) Roar Ljøkelsøy	268.4
3	(Czech Republic) Jakub Janda	262.6
4	(Japan) Takanobu Okabe	260.8
5	(Finland) Matti Hautamäki	258.0
6	(Austria) Andreas Widhölzl	248.1
7	(Germany) Georg Spaeth	245.3
8	(Switzerland) Simon Ammann	244.8
9	(Germany) Michael Uhrmann	244.4
10	(Norway) Bjørn Einar Romøren	243.8

=== Garmisch-Partenkirchen ===
(Germany) Große Olympiaschanze, Garmisch-Partenkirchen
31 December 2005 - 1 January 2006

Qualification winner: (Japan) Noriaki Kasai

Rank	Name	Points
1	(Czech Republic) Jakub Janda	264.7
2	(Finland) Janne Ahonen	262.2
3	(Finland) Matti Hautamäki	260.3
4	(Switzerland) Andreas Küttel	259.8
5	(Norway) Roar Ljøkelsøy	249.8
6	(Austria) Andreas Kofler	248.9
7	(Germany) Michael Uhrmann	246.6
8	(Switzerland) Simon Ammann	242.9
9	(Germany) Georg Spaeth	240.8
10	(Japan) Takanobu Okabe	238.6

=== Innsbruck ===
(Austria) Bergiselschanze, Innsbruck
03-4 January 2006

Qualification winner: (Finland) Janne Ahonen

Rank	Name	Points
1	(Norway) Lars Bystøl	264.7
2	(Czech Republic) Jakub Janda	263.2
3	(Norway) Bjørn Einar Romøren	258.1
4	(Austria) Thomas Morgenstern	257.6
5	(Norway) Roar Ljøkelsøy	256.9
6	(Finland) Janne Ahonen	255.4
7	(Switzerland) Andreas Küttel	255.2
8	(Japan) Takanobu Okabe	253.8
9	(Japan) Noriaki Kasai	251.7
10	(Slovenia) Rok Benkovič	251.4

=== Bischofshofen ===
(Austria) Paul-Ausserleitner-Schanze, Bischofshofen
05-6 January 2006

Qualification winner: (Finland) Janne Ahonen

After three out of four events, World Cup leader Jakub Janda was two points ahead of defending champion Janne Ahonen. With Janda skipping the qualification tournament, and Ahonen winning it, there was a direct duel between the two jumpers at the first round of the final tournament. Janda jumped first, and reached 141.0m, surpassing the leading Ljøkelsøy by four meters. Ahonen then reached the same distance, but lost the duel due to worse Judges Marks by one point. As the best duel loser, he still qualified for the second and final round in second place.

Ahonen reached 141.5 meters in his second attempt, earning 146.7 points. With Janda then reaching 'only' 139.0 meters in the tournament's final jump (still the second-furthest jump of the second round), earning 143.7 points, Ahonen surpassed him in the Bischofshofen ranking and equalized in the tournament ranking - both having scored exactly 1081.5 points over the four events.

Rank	Name	Points
1	(Finland) Janne Ahonen	293.0
2	(Czech Republic) Jakub Janda	291.0
3	(Norway) Roar Ljøkelsøy	282.0
4	(Switzerland) Andreas Küttel	277.7
5	(Norway) Bjørn Einar Romøren	265.8
6	(Japan) Takanobu Okabe	264.6
7	(Germany) Alexander Herr	262.0
8	(Austria) Thomas Morgenstern	257.6
9	(Austria) Andreas Widhölzl	256.6
10	(Austria) Andreas Kofler	255.9

== Final ranking ==
Rank	Name	Oberstorf	Garmisch-Partenkirchen	Innsbruck	Bischofshofen	Points
1	(Finland) Janne Ahonen	1st	2nd	6th	1st	1,081.5
1	(Czech Republic) Jakub Janda	3rd	1st	2nd	2nd	1,081.5
3	(Norway) Roar Ljøkelsøy	2nd	5th	5th	3rd	1,057.1
4	(Switzerland) Andreas Küttel	20th	4th	7th	4th	1,022.9
5	(Finland) Matti Hautamäki	5th	3rd	15th	15th	1,018.0
6	(Japan) Takanobu Okabe	4th	10th	8th	6th	1,017.8
7	(Norway) Bjørn Einar Romøren	10th	16th	3rd	5th	997.9
8	(Austria) Andreas Kofler	15th	6th	11th	10th	992.8
9	(Japan) Noriaki Kasai	13th	12th	9th	11th	981.5
10	(Germany) Georg Spaeth	7th	9th	13th	22nd	976.7

Lars Bystøl, who won the Innsbruck event, placed only 20th or above in the other three competitions and placed 16th in the final ranking.
