= 2004–05 FIS Ski Jumping Continental Cup =

Ski-jumping competition series

FIS Ski Jumping Continental Cup 2004/05
Discipline	Men	Women
Summer	(Poland) Robert Mateja	—
Winter	(Norway) Anders Bardal	(Norway) Anette Sagen

Competition
Edition	3rd (Summer), 14th (Winter)	— (Summer), 1st (Winter)
Locations	4 (Summer), 16 (Winter)	— (Summer), 10 (Winter)
Individual	8 (Summer), 30 (Winter)	— (Summer), 12 (Winter)
Team	— (Summer), — (Winter)	— (Summer), 1 (Winter)
Cancelled	— (Summer), 1 (Winter)	— (Summer), 2 (Winter)

The 2004/05 FIS Ski Jumping Continental Cup was the 14th in a row (12th official) Continental Cup winter season and the 3rd summer separated season in ski jumping for men.

This was also the 1st winter season for women and for the first time women's team event was organized this season. Both summer and winter women's events counted as one complete season, although men's summer separate season was already introduced in 2002.

Other circuits this season included the World Cup and Grand Prix.

== Men's summer ==
Individual men's summer events in the CC history

Total	F	L	N	Winners
28	—	8	20	20

after large hill winter event in Lillehammer (22 August 2004)

=== Calendar ===
All	No.	Date	Place (Hill)	Size	Winner	Second	Third	R.
21	1	9 July 2004	(Slovenia) Velenje (Grajski grič HS94)	N _{015}	(Slovenia) Bine Zupan	(Slovenia) Jernej Damjan	(Slovenia) Robert Kranjec	
22	2	10 July 2004	(Slovenia) Velenje (Grajski grič HS94)	N _{016}	(Austria) Stefan Kaiser	(Poland) Robert Mateja	(Slovenia) Jernej Damjan	
23	3	24 July 2004	(Germany) Oberstdorf (Schattenbergschanze HS137)	L _{007}	(Poland) Adam Małysz	(Slovenia) Robert Kranjec	(Poland) Robert Mateja	
24	4	25 July 2004	(Germany) Oberstdorf (Schattenbergschanze HS137)	L _{008}	(Poland) Adam Małysz	(Slovenia) Robert Kranjec	(Norway) Morten Gjesvold	
25	5	14 August 2004	(Austria) Ramsau (W90-Mattensprunganlage HS98)	N _{017}	(Austria) Stefan Kaiser	(Poland) Robert Mateja	(Austria) Balthasar Schneider	
26	6	15 August 2004	(Austria) Ramsau (W90-Mattensprunganlage HS98)	N _{018}	(Poland) Robert Mateja	(Slovenia) Jernej Damjan	(Austria) Andreas Kofler	
27	7	21 August 2004	(Norway) Lillehammer (Lysgårdsbakken HS100)	N _{019}	(Germany) Ferdinand Bader	(Norway) Daniel Forfang	(Austria) Balthasar Schneider	
28	8	22 August 2004	(Norway) Lillehammer (Lysgårdsbakken HS100)	N _{020}	(Norway) Morten Solem	(Germany) Ferdinand Bader	(Norway) Daniel Forfang	
3rd FIS Summer Continental Cup Men's Overall (9 July – 22 August 2004)					(Poland) Robert Mateja	(Austria) Stefan Kaiser	(Slovenia) Jernej Damjan	

==== Overall ====
Rank	after 8 events	Points
1	(Poland) Robert Mateja	480
2	(Austria) Stefan Kaiser	375
3	(Slovenia) Jernej Damjan	345
4	(Austria) Balthasar Schneider	244
5	(Slovenia) Robert Kranjec	240
6	(Slovenia) Primož Pikl	209
7	(Slovenia) Bine Zupan	205
8	(Poland) Adam Małysz	200
9	(Germany) Ferdinand Bader	180
10	(Norway) Daniel Forfang	176

== Men's winter ==
Individual men's winter events in the CC history

Total	F	L	N	Winners
528	4	211	313	211

after large hill winter event in Zakopane (12 March 2005)

=== Calendar ===
All	No.	Date	Place (Hill)	Size	Winner	Second	Third	Overall leader	R.
499	1	4 December 2004	(Finland) Rovaniemi (Ounasvaara HS100)	N _{301}	(Austria) Balthasar Schneider	(Czech Republic) Jan Mazoch	(Japan) Kazuya Yoshioka	(Austria) B. Schneider	
500	2	5 December 2004	(Finland) Rovaniemi (Ounasvaara HS100)	N _{302}	(Austria) Balthasar Schneider	(Czech Republic) Jan Mazoch	(Germany) Andreas Wank	(Austria) B. Schneider	
501	3	8 December 2004	(Finland) Lahti (Salpausselkä HS130)	L _{195}	(Austria) Roland Müller	(Finland) Risto Jussilainen	(Austria) Stefan Thurnbichler	(Austria) B. Schneider	
502	4	9 December 2004	(Finland) Lahti (Salpausselkä HS130)	L _{196}	(Austria) Mathias Hafele	(Austria) Balthasar Schneider	(Finland) Risto Jussilainen	(Austria) B. Schneider	
503	5	17 December 2004	(Czech Republic) Harrachov (Čerťák HS142)	L _{197}	(Austria) Martin Koch	(Austria) Roland Müller	(Czech Republic) Jan Mazoch	(Austria) B. Schneider	
504	6	19 December 2004	(Czech Republic) Harrachov (Čerťák HS142)	L _{198}	(Austria) Roland Müller	(Czech Republic) Jan Mazoch	(Austria) Martin Koch	(Austria) B. Schneider	
505	7	26 December 2004	(Switzerland) St. Moritz (Olympiaschanze HS100)	N _{303}	(Russia) Dimitry Vasiliev	(France) Emmanuel Chedal	(Poland) Kamil Stoch	(Austria) B. Schneider	
506	8	27 December 2004	(Switzerland) Engelberg (Gross-Titlis HS137)	L _{199}	(Slovenia) Jure Bogataj	(Austria) Mathias Hafele	(France) Emmanuel Chedal	(Austria) Roland Müller	
507	9	28 December 2004	(Switzerland) Engelberg (Gross-Titlis HS137)	L _{200}	(Poland) Paweł Urbański	(Germany) Erik Simon	(Switzerland) Lucas Vonlanthen	(Austria) Roland Müller	
508	10	1 January 2005	(Austria) Seefeld in Tirol (Toni-Seelos HS100)	N _{304}	(Russia) Dimitry Ipatov	(Austria) R. Schwarzenberger	(Austria) Manuel Fettner	(Austria) Roland Müller	
509	11	8 January 2005	(Slovenia) Planica (Srednja Bloudkova HS100)	N _{305}	(Norway) Anders Bardal	(Slovenia) Jure Bogataj (Japan) Takanobu Okabe		(Austria) Roland Müller	
510	12	9 January 2005	(Slovenia) Planica (Srednja Bloudkova HS100)	N _{306}	(Norway) Anders Bardal	(Japan) Takanobu Okabe	(Austria) Manuel Fettner	(Japan) Takanobu Okabe	
511	13	14 January 2005	(Japan) Sapporo (Miyanomori HS98) (Ōkurayama HS134)	N _{307}	(Japan) Tsuyoshi Ichinohe	(Finland) Jussi Hautamäki	(Japan) Yukio Sakano	N/A	
512	14	15 January 2005	(Japan) Sapporo (Miyanomori HS98) (Ōkurayama HS134)	L _{201}	(Japan) Tsuyoshi Ichinohe	(Austria) Balthasar Schneider	(Norway) Anders Bardal	N/A	
513	15	16 January 2005	(Japan) Sapporo (Miyanomori HS98) (Ōkurayama HS134)	L _{202}	(Finland) Kimmo Yliriesto	(Finland) Jussi Hautamäki	(Norway) Anders Bardal	(Norway) Anders Bardal	
514	16	22 January 2005	(Austria) Bischofshofen (Paul-Ausserleitner HS140)	L _{203}	(Finland) Janne Happonen	(Austria) Balthasar Schneider	(Czech Republic) Antonín Hájek	(Austria) B. Schneider	
515	17	23 January 2005	(Austria) Bischofshofen (Paul-Ausserleitner HS140)	L _{204}	(Austria) Balthasar Schneider	(Austria) Florian Liegl	(Austria) Roland Müller	(Austria) B. Schneider	
516	18	29 January 2005	(Germany) Lauscha (Marktiegelschanze HS102)	N _{308}	(Slovenia) Robert Kranjec	(Finland) Kalle Keituri	(South Korea) Choi Heung-chul	(Austria) B. Schneider	
517	19	30 January 2005	(Germany) Lauscha (Marktiegelschanze HS102)	N _{309}	(Norway) Thomas Lobben	(Germany) Christian Bruder	(Finland) Kalle Keituri	(Austria) B. Schneider	
518	20	5 February 2005	(Germany) Braunlage (Wurmbergschanze HS100)	N _{310}	(Norway) Thomas Lobben	(Slovenia) Robert Kranjec	(Slovenia) Primož Pikl	(Austria) B. Schneider	
519	21	6 February 2005	(Germany) Braunlage (Wurmbergschanze HS100)	N _{311}	(Norway) Thomas Lobben	(South Korea) Choi Yong-jik	(Slovenia) Rok Urbanc	(Austria) B. Schneider	
520	22	12 February 2005	(Germany) Brotterode (Inselbergschanze HS117)	L _{205}	(South Korea) Choi Yong-jik	(Finland) Kalle Keituri	(Austria) Bastian Kaltenböck	(Austria) B. Schneider	
521	23	13 February 2005	(Germany) Brotterode (Inselbergschanze HS117)	L _{206}	(Finland) Kalle Keituri	(Austria) Manuel Fettner	(Austria) Stefan Thurnbichler	(Austria) B. Schneider	
522	24	19 February 2005	(United States) Westby (Snowflake HS117)	L _{207}	(Norway) Anders Bardal	(Austria) Manuel Fettner	(Austria) Balthasar Schneider	(Austria) B. Schneider	
523	25	20 February 2005	(United States) Westby (Snowflake HS117)	L _{208}	(Norway) Anders Bardal	(Slovenia) Rok Urbanc	(Finland) Kalle Keituri	(Austria) B. Schneider	
524	26	26 February 2005	(United States) Iron Mountain (Pine Mountain HS133)	L _{209}	(Norway) Anders Bardal	(Austria) Stefan Thurnbichler	(Austria) Christian Nagiller	(Norway) Anders Bardal	
525	27	27 February 2005	(United States) Iron Mountain (Pine Mountain HS133)	L _{210}	(Norway) Anders Bardal	(Germany) Maximilian Mechler	(Slovenia) Rok Urbanc	(Norway) Anders Bardal	
526	28	5 March 2005	(Norway) Vikersund (Vikersundbakken HS100)	N _{312}	(Finland) Janne Happonen	(Austria) R. Schwarzenberger	(Norway) Anders Bardal	(Norway) Anders Bardal	
527	29	6 March 2005	(Norway) Vikersund (Vikersundbakken HS100)	N _{313}	(Finland) Janne Happonen	(Norway) Anders Bardal	(Austria) R. Schwarzenberger	(Norway) Anders Bardal	
528	30	12 March 2005	(Poland) Zakopane (Wielka Krokiew HS134)	L _{211}	(Czech Republic) Jan Mazoch	(Finland) Veli-Matti Lindström	(Japan) Yūsuke Kaneko	(Norway) Anders Bardal	
		13 March 2005	(Poland) Zakopane (Wielka Krokiew HS134)	L _{cnx}	cancelled			—	
14th FIS Winter Continental Cup Men's Overall (4 December 2004 – 12 March 2005)					(Norway) Anders Bardal	(Austria) Balthasar Schneider	(Austria) Stefan Thurnbichler	Winter Overall	

==== Overall ====
Rank	after 30 events	Points
1	(Norway) Anders Bardal	1082
2	(Austria) Balthasar Schneider	800
3	(Austria) Stefan Thurnbichler	766
4	(Norway) Thomas Lobben	574
5	(Austria) Manuel Fettner	567
6	(Austria) Mathias Hafele	561
7	(Japan) Tsuyoshi Ichinohe	544
8	(Czech Republic) Jan Mazoch	542
9	(Finland) Kalle Keituri	540
10	(Norway) Jon Aaraas	521

== Women's individual ==
Individual women's events in the CC history

Total	L	N	M	Winners
12	1	10	1	3

after large hill event in Oslo (12 March 2005)

=== Calendar ===
All	No.	Date	Place (Hill)	Size	Winner	Second	Third	R.
1	1	23 July 2004	(United States) Park City (Utah Olympic Park HS100)	N _{001}	(Austria) Daniela Iraschko	(Norway) Anette Sagen	(Slovenia) Monika Pogladič	
2	2	24 July 2004	(United States) Park City (Utah Olympic Park HS100)	N _{002}	(Austria) Daniela Iraschko	(Norway) Anette Sagen	(United States) Jessica Jerome	
		15 January 2005	(Slovenia) Planica (Srednja Bloudkova HS100)	N _{cnx}	cancelled			
3	3	16 January 2005	(Slovenia) Planica (Srednja Bloudkova HS100)	N _{003}	(Norway) Anette Sagen	(United States) Lindsey Van	(Slovenia) Monika Pogladič	
4	4	19 January 2005	(Italy) Toblach (Trampolino Sulzenhof HS74)	M _{001}	(Norway) Anette Sagen	(United States) Lindsey Van	(United States) Jessica Jerome	
5	5	22 January 2005	(Germany) Oberaudorf (Kahlanger Schanze HS89)	N _{004}	(Norway) Anette Sagen	(Germany) Ulrike Gräßler	(United States) Lindsey Van	
6	6	8 February 2005	(Germany) Schönwald (Adlerschanzen Schönwald HS93)	N _{005}	(Austria) Daniela Iraschko	(United States) Lindsey Van	(Norway) Anette Sagen	
7	7	12 February 2005	(Germany) Baiersbronn (Große Ruhesteinschanze HS90)	N _{006}	(Slovenia) Monika Pogladič	(Slovenia) Maja Vtič	(United States) Lindsey Van	
		15 February 2005	(Germany) Breitenberg (Baptist-Kitzlinger-Schanze HS82)	N _{cnx}	cancelled			
8	8	16 February 2005	(Germany) Breitenberg (Baptist-Kitzlinger-Schanze HS82)	N _{007}	(Norway) Anette Sagen	(Austria) Daniela Iraschko	(Norway) Line Jahr	
9	9	19 February 2005	(Austria) Saalfelden (Bibergschanze HS95)	N _{008}	(Norway) Anette Sagen	(Austria) Daniela Iraschko	(Norway) Line Jahr	
7th FIS Ladies Grand Prix Overall (8 – 19 February 2005)					(Austria) Daniela Iraschko	(United States) Lindsey Van	(Germany) Ulrike Gräßler	
10	10	5 March 2005	(Norway) Vikersund (Vikersundbakken HS100)	N _{009}	(Norway) Anette Sagen	(United States) Lindsey Van	(Germany) Ulrike Gräßler	
11	11	6 March 2005	(Norway) Vikersund (Vikersundbakken HS100)	N _{010}	(Norway) Anette Sagen	(Norway) Line Jahr	(United States) Lindsey Van	
12	12	12 March 2005	(Norway) Oslo (Holmenkollbakken HS128)	L _{001}	(Norway) Anette Sagen	(United States) Lindsey Van	(United States) Jessica Jerome	
1st FIS Continental Cup Women's Overall (23 July 2004 – 12 March 2005)					(Norway) Anette Sagen	(United States) Lindsey Van	(Austria) Daniela Iraschko	

==== Overall ====
Rank	after 12 events	Points
1	(Norway) Anette Sagen	1020
2	(United States) Lindsey Van	740
3	(Austria) Daniela Iraschko	620
4	(Norway) Line Jahr	567
5	(United States) Jessica Jerome	525
6	(Germany) Ulrike Gräßler	519
7	(Slovenia) Monika Pogladič	478
8	(Slovenia) Maja Vtič	374
9	(United States) Alissa Johnson	304
10	(Germany) Juliane Seyfarth	292

== Team events ==
Team events in the Continental Cup history

Total	N	Winners	Competition
1	1	1	Women's team

after women's NH team event in Baiersbronn (13 February 2005)

=== Calendar ===
All	No.	Date	Place (Hill)	Size	Winner	Second	Third
Women's team
1	1	13 February 2005	(Germany) Baiersbronn (Große Ruhesteinschanze HS90)	N _{001}	Austria Tanja Drage; Jacqueline Seifriedsberger; Eva Ganster; Daniela Iraschko	Slovenia Anja Tepeš; Petra Benedik; Monika Pogladič; Maja Vtič	United States Karla Keck; Alissa Johnson; Jessica Jerome; Lindsey Van

== Europa Cup vs. Continental Cup ==
- Last two Europa Cup seasons (1991/92 and 1992/93) are recognized as first two Continental Cup seasons by International Ski Federation (FIS), although Continental Cup under this name officially started first season in 1993/94 season.

== See also ==
- 2004–05 FIS World Cup
- 2004 FIS Grand Prix
