= 2004 FIS Ski Jumping Grand Prix =

International ski jumping competition

Ski Jumping Grand Prix 2004
Winners
- Overall: (Poland) Adam Małysz
- Nations Cup: Austria

Competitions
- Venues: 6
- Individual: 7
- Team: 2

The 2004 FIS Ski Jumping Grand Prix was the 11th Summer Grand Prix season in ski jumping on plastic. The season began on 31 July 2004 in Hinterzarten, Germany and ended on 26 September 2004 in Hakuba, Japan.

Other competitive circuits this season included the World Cup and the Continental Cup.

== Calendar ==
=== Men ===
No.	Season	Date	Place	Hill	Size	Winner	Second	Third	Yellow bib	Det.
54	1	31 Jul 2004	(Germany) Hinterzarten	Rothaus-Schanze HS 108	NH	(Poland) Adam Małysz	(Austria) Thomas Morgenstern	(Japan) Noriaki Kasai	(Poland) Adam Małysz	
55	2	7 Aug 2004	(France) Courchevel	Tremplin du Praz HS 132	LH	(Poland) Adam Małysz	(Austria) Martin Höllwarth	(Slovenia) Rok Benkovič	(Poland) Adam Małysz	
56	3	4 Sep 2004	(Poland) Zakopane	Wielka Krokiew HS 134 (night)	LH	(Poland) Adam Małysz	(Slovenia) Robert Kranjec	(Czech Republic) Jakub Janda (Norway) Bjørn Einar Romøren	(Poland) Adam Małysz	
57	4	8 Sep 2004	(Italy) Predazzo	Trampolino dal Ben HS 134 (night)	LH	(Poland) Adam Małysz	(Austria) Andreas Widhölzl	(Switzerland) Andreas Küttel	(Poland) Adam Małysz	
58	5	12 Sep 2004	(Austria) Innsbruck	Bergisel HS 130	LH	(Norway) Daniel Forfang	(Norway) Roar Ljøkelsøy	(Japan) Hideharu Miyahira	(Poland) Adam Małysz	
59	6	25 Sep 2004	(Japan) Hakuba	Olympic Ski Jumps HS 131 (night)	LH	(Norway) Daniel Forfang	(Finland) Matti Hautamäki	(Japan) Noriaki Kasai	(Poland) Adam Małysz	
60	7	26 Sep 2004	(Japan) Hakuba	Olympic Ski Jumps HS 131	LH	(Austria) Martin Höllwarth	(Norway) Daniel Forfang	(Poland) Adam Małysz	(Poland) Adam Małysz	

=== Men's team ===
No.	Season	Date	Place	Hill	Size	Winner	Second	Third	Yellow bib	Det.
6	1	1 Aug 2004	(Germany) Hinterzarten	Rothaus-Schanze HS 108	NH	Austria Andreas Widhölzl; Reinhard Schwarzenberger; Martin Höllwarth; Thomas Morgenstern	Japan Daiki Itō; Kazuyoshi Funaki; Hideharu Miyahira; Noriaki Kasai	Poland Wojciech Tajner; Robert Mateja; Mateusz Rutkowski; Adam Małysz	Austria	
7	2	5 Sep 2004	(Poland) Zakopane	Wielka Krokiew HS 134	LH	Norway Daniel Forfang; Roar Ljøkelsøy; Tommy Ingebrigtsen; Bjørn Einar Romøren	Austria Andreas Widhölzl; Reinhard Schwarzenberger; Thomas Morgenstern; Martin Höllwarth	Japan Kazuyoshi Funaki; Akira Higashi; Daiki Itō; Noriaki Kasai	Austria	

== Standings ==
=== Overall ===
Rank	Ski jumper	Points
1	(Poland) Adam Małysz	520
2	(Austria) Martin Höllwarth	362
3	(Norway) Daniel Forfang	312
4	(Austria) Thomas Morgenstern	273
5	(Japan) Noriaki Kasai	263

- After 7 events.

=== Nations Cup ===
Rank	Country	Points
1	Austria	2089
2	Norway	1464
3	Japan	1386
4	Poland	999
5	Slovenia	808

- After 9 events.
