= Rok Urbanc =

Slovenian former ski jumper (born 1985)

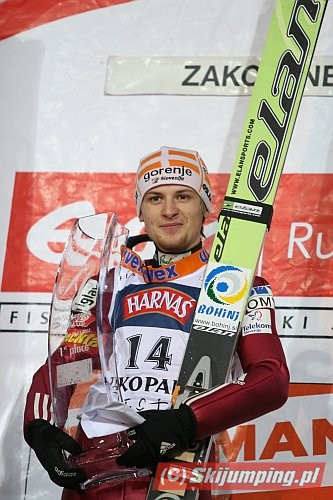

Personal information
- Nationality: Slovenia
- Born: 28 February 1985 (age 41) Jesenice, SR Slovenia, SFR Yugoslavia
- Height: 1.79 m (5 ft 10 1/2 in)

Sport
- Sport: Skiing
- Club: SK Triglav Kranj

World Cup career
- Seasons: 2003; 2005–2010
- Indiv. starts: 24
- Indiv. podiums: 1
- Indiv. wins: 1
- Team starts: 4

Achievements and titles
- Personal bests: 197 m (646 ft); Planica, 18-20 March 2005
- Updated on 10 February 2016

Rok Urbanc (born 28 February 1985) is a Slovenian former ski jumper. He won his first World Cup event in Zakopane in 2007.

== World Cup ==
=== Standings ===
Season	Overall	4H	SF	NT
2002/03	76	—	N/A	—
2004/05	—	—	N/A	63
2005/06	79	—	N/A	52
2006/07	36	—	N/A	—
2008/09	71	—	—	—
2009/10	—	—	—	—

=== Wins ===
No.	Season	Date	Location	Hill	Size
1	2006/07	20 January 2007	(Poland) Zakopane	Wielka Krokiew HS134 (night)	LH
