= Janne Ahonen =

Finnish ski jumper and drag racer (born 1977)

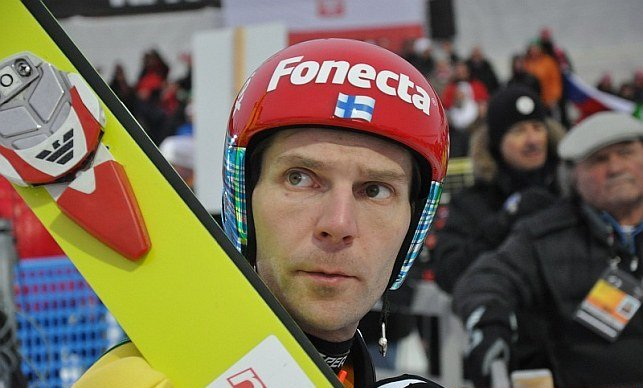
- Ahonen in Oslo, 2011

Personal information
- Full name: Janne Petteri Ahonen
- Nationality: Finland
- Born: 11 May 1977 (age 49) Lahti, Finland

Sport
- Sport: Skiing
- Club: Lahden Hiihtoseura

World Cup career
- Seasons: 1993–2008; 2010–2011; 2013–2018
- Indiv. starts: 412
- Indiv. podiums: 108
- Indiv. wins: 36
- Team starts: 47
- Team podiums: 25
- Team wins: 10
- Overall titles: 2 (2004, 2005)
- Four Hills titles: 5 (1999, 2003, 2005, 2006, 2008)
- Nordic titles: 1 (2000)
- JP titles: 1 (1999)

Achievements and titles
- Personal bests: 233.5 m (766 ft); Planica, 20 March 2005
Medal record
Men's ski jumping
| Event | 1st | 2nd | 3rd |
|---|---|---|---|
| Olympic Games | 0 | 2 | 0 |
| World Championships | 5 | 3 | 2 |
| Ski Flying World Championships | 0 | 5 | 2 |
| Total | 5 | 10 | 4 |
Olympic Games
| Silver medal – second place | 2002 Salt Lake City | Team LH |
| Silver medal – second place | 2006 Turin | Team LH |
World Championships
| Gold medal – first place | 1995 Thunder Bay | Team LH |
| Gold medal – first place | 1997 Trondheim | Individual NH |
| Gold medal – first place | 1997 Trondheim | Team LH |
| Gold medal – first place | 2003 Val di Fiemme | Team LH |
| Gold medal – first place | 2005 Oberstdorf | Individual LH |
| Silver medal – second place | 2001 Lahti | Team LH |
| Silver medal – second place | 2001 Lahti | Team NH |
| Silver medal – second place | 2005 Oberstdorf | Team LH |
| Bronze medal – third place | 2001 Lahti | Individual LH |
| Bronze medal – third place | 2005 Oberstdorf | Individual NH |
Men's ski flying
World Championships
| Silver medal – second place | 1996 Bad Mitterndorf | Individual |
| Silver medal – second place | 2004 Planica | Individual |
| Silver medal – second place | 2004 Planica | Team |
| Silver medal – second place | 2006 Bad Mitterndorf | Team |
| Silver medal – second place | 2008 Oberstdorf | Team |
| Bronze medal – third place | 2000 Vikersund | Individual |
| Bronze medal – third place | 2008 Oberstdorf | Individual |

Janne Petteri Ahonen (pronounced [ˈjɑnːe ˈpetːeri ˈɑhonen]; born 11 May 1977) is a Finnish former ski jumper and drag racer. He competed in ski jumping between 1992 and 2018, and is one of the sport's most successful athletes of all time, as well as one of the most successful from Finland. Ahonen won two consecutive World Cup overall titles (the most recent ski jumper to do so, as of 2025), the Four Hills Tournament a record five times, two individual gold medals at the World Championships, and the Nordic Tournament once. Nicknamed Kuningaskotka ("King Eagle"), he has been described as the greatest ski jumper to have never won an individual medal at the Winter Olympics.

== Career ==
Ahonen's most notable achievements include five World Championships (normal hill in 1997; large hill in 2005; team large hill in 1995, 1997 and 2003), two World Cup overall titles (2003/04 and 2004/05) and a record-breaking five victories in the Four Hills Tournament (1998/99, 2002/03, 2004/05, 2005/06 and 2007/08). He is the all-time leader in World Cup points, podiums (133) and top 10 appearances (245). With 36 World Cup victories, Ahonen has the fourth-most behind Gregor Schlierenzauer, Matti Nykänen and Adam Małysz. In 2005, Ahonen was named the Finnish Sports Personality of the Year.

Over the course of nine World Ski Jumping Championships, nine Ski Flying World Championships and seven Winter Olympics, Ahonen has won a total of 19 medals, equalling the medal count of Matti Nykänen–although most of Ahonen's are in team, rather than individual events. Despite his successes, Ahonen has never won an individual Olympic medal, placing fourth three times. In Olympic team competitions, he has won two silver medals. His seven Olympic Games rank him second in terms of number of Olympic participations among ski jumpers, behind Noriaki Kasai.

Ahonen announced his retirement from ski jumping on 28 March 2008, with a farewell competition held in Lahti on 9 July 2008. After a season's absence, he returned for two more seasons in 2009/10 and 2010/11. The best achievement of his revived career was a second place in the 2009/10 Four Hills Tournament.

During his ski jumping career, Ahonen has been known for his apparent lack of emotion and is rarely seen smiling even on the podium. When asked for a reason, he responded with "We came here to jump and not to smile." In Finnish interviews Ahonen often made sarcastic comments with dry humour. The German press nicknamed Ahonen "Der Mann mit der Maske" ("The Man with the Mask"), in reference to the distinctive plastic masks he wore in competitions from 1996 until 2002. In Finland, Ahonen is often called "Kuningaskotka" ("King Eagle").

On 10 January 2013, Ahonen announced that he would come out of retirement for a second time, with the aim of winning a medal in an individual event at the 2014 Winter Olympics in Sochi. He went on to finish 29th on the normal hill and 22nd on the large hill. Ahonen also was a member of the Finnish ski jumping team at the 2018 Winter Olympics in PyeongChang, South Korea, where he placed 27th and 40th in the individual competitions and was part of the Finnish team that finished eighth in the team competition.

In October 2018, Ahonen announced his retirement from competitive jumping for a third time, stating "I will never quit ski jumping – I will continue to jump when I feel like it – but I can confirm that I will not take part in any competitions anymore".

After the controversies at the world championships in 2025, Ahonen confessed that he also had used oversized illegal jumping suits during his active career.

== Olympic games ==
=== Standings ===
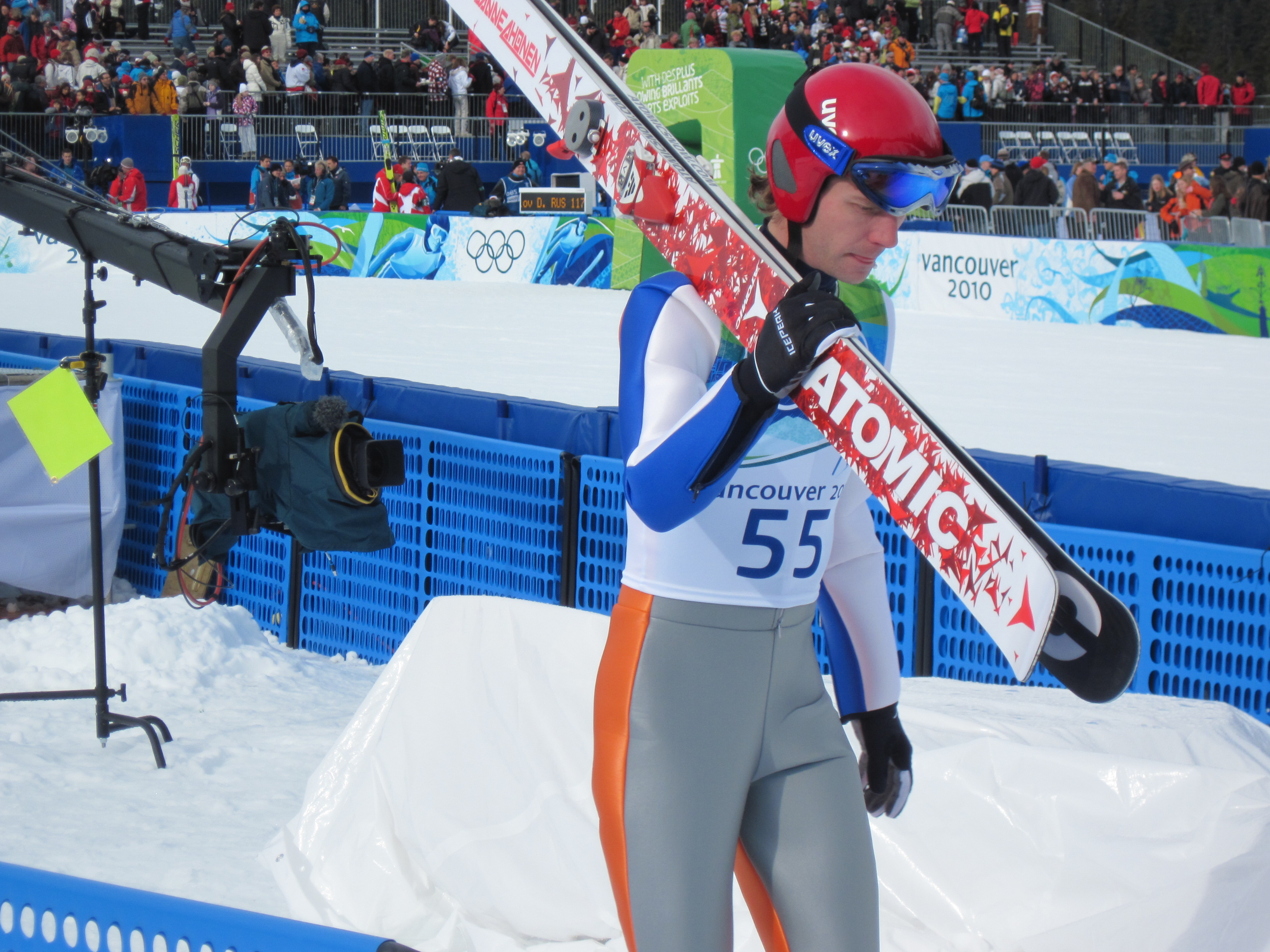
Janne Ahonen at 2010 Winter Olympics

| Event | Age | Normal hill | Large hill | Team |
|---|---|---|---|---|
| (Norway) 1994 Lillehammer | 16 | 37th | 25th | 5th |
| (Japan) 1998 Nagano | 20 | 4th | 37th | 5th |
| (United States) 2002 Salt Lake City | 24 | 4th | 9th | Silver |
| (Italy) 2006 Turin | 28 | 6th | 9th | Silver |
| (Canada) 2010 Vancouver | 32 | 4th | 31st | – |
| (Russia) 2014 Sochi | 36 | 29th | 22nd | 8th |
| (South Korea) 2018 Pyeongchang | 40 | 40th | 28th | 8th |

== World Cup ==
=== Standings ===
| Season | Overall | 4H | SF | RA | W5 | P7 | NT | JP |
|---|---|---|---|---|---|---|---|---|
| 1992–93 | 50 | 46 | — | N/A | N/A | N/A | N/A | N/A |
| 1993–94 | 10 | 16 | 12 | N/A | N/A | N/A | N/A | N/A |
| 1994–95 | 3rd place, bronze medalist(s) | 3rd place, bronze medalist(s) | 5 | N/A | N/A | N/A | N/A | N/A |
| 1995–96 | 3rd place, bronze medalist(s) | 6 | 2nd place, silver medalist(s) | N/A | N/A | N/A | N/A | 5 |
| 1996–97 | 8 | 18 | 7 | N/A | N/A | N/A | 4 | 9 |
| 1997–98 | 9 | 3rd place, bronze medalist(s) | 11 | N/A | N/A | N/A | 9 | 8 |
| 1998–99 | 2nd place, silver medalist(s) | 1st place, gold medalist(s) | 6 | N/A | N/A | N/A | 15 | 1st place, gold medalist(s) |
| 1999–00 | 3rd place, bronze medalist(s) | 2nd place, silver medalist(s) | 2nd place, silver medalist(s) | N/A | N/A | N/A | 1st place, gold medalist(s) | 3rd place, bronze medalist(s) |
| 2000–01 | 5 | 2nd place, silver medalist(s) | 6 | N/A | N/A | N/A | 36 | N/A |
| 2001–02 | 15 | 26 | N/A | N/A | N/A | N/A | 6 | N/A |
| 2002–03 | 4 | 1st place, gold medalist(s) | N/A | N/A | N/A | N/A | 13 | N/A |
| 2003–04 | 1st place, gold medalist(s) | 5 | N/A | N/A | N/A | N/A | 4 | N/A |
| 2004–05 | 1st place, gold medalist(s) | 1st place, gold medalist(s) | N/A | N/A | N/A | N/A | 5 | N/A |
| 2005–06 | 2nd place, silver medalist(s) | 1st place, gold medalist(s) | N/A | N/A | N/A | N/A | 24 | N/A |
| 2006–07 | 8 | 8 | N/A | N/A | N/A | N/A | 4 | N/A |
| 2007–08 | 3rd place, bronze medalist(s) | 1st place, gold medalist(s) | N/A | N/A | N/A | N/A | 4 | N/A |
| 2009–10 | 11 | 2nd place, silver medalist(s) | 10 | N/A | N/A | N/A | 51 | N/A |
| 2010–11 | 44 | 24 | — | N/A | N/A | N/A | N/A | N/A |
| 2013–14 | 31 | 23 | — | N/A | N/A | N/A | N/A | N/A |
| 2014–15 | 58 | — | 46 | N/A | N/A | N/A | N/A | N/A |
| 2015–16 | — | — | — | N/A | N/A | N/A | N/A | N/A |
| 2016–17 | 50 | — | 36 | 74 | N/A | N/A | N/A | N/A |
| 2017–18 | — | — | — | — | — | — | N/A | N/A |

=== Wins ===
| No. | Season | Date | Location | Hill | Size |
|---|---|---|---|---|---|
| 1 | 1993–94 | 19 December 1993 | (Switzerland) Engelberg | Gross-Titlis-Schanze K120 | LH |
| 2 | 1994–95 | 1 January 1995 | (Germany) Garmisch-Partenkirchen | Große Olympiaschanze K107 | LH |
| 3 | 1995–96 | 3 December 1995 | (Norway) Lillehammer | Lysgårdsbakken K120 | LH |
| 4 | 1995–96 | 10 February 1996 | (Austria) Tauplitz/Bad Mitterndorf | Kulm K185 | FH |
| 5 | 1997–98 | 7 March 1998 | (Finland) Lahti | Salpausselkä K114 | LH |
| 6 | 1998–99 | 6 December 1998 | (France) Chamonix | Le Mont K95 | NH |
| 7 | 1998–99 | 19 December 1998 | (Czech Republic) Harrachov | Čerťák K120 | LH |
| 8 | 1998–99 | 20 December 1998 | (Czech Republic) Harrachov | Čerťák K120 | LH |
| 9 | 1998–99 | 9 January 1999 | (Switzerland) Engelberg | Gross-Titlis-Schanze K120 | LH |
| 10 | 1998–99 | 17 January 1999 | (Poland) Zakopane | Wielka Krokiew K116 | LH |
| 11 | 1998–99 | 7 February 1999 | (Czech Republic) Harrachov | Čerťák K120 | LH |
| 12 | 1999–00 | 12 December 1999 | (Austria) Villach | Villacher Alpenarena K90 | NH |
| 13 | 1999–00 | 4 December 2000 | (Finland) Lahti | Salpausselkä K90 | NH |
| 14 | 2002–03 | 21 December 2002 | (Switzerland) Engelberg | Gross-Titlis-Schanze K125 | LH |
| 15 | 2002–03 | 4 January 2003 | (Austria) Innsbruck | Bergiselschanze K120 | LH |
| 16 | 2003–04 | 10 January 2004 | (Czech Republic) Liberec | Ještěd A K120 | LH |
| 17 | 2003–04 | 11 January 2004 | (Czech Republic) Liberec | Ještěd A K120 | LH |
| 18 | 2003–04 | 14 February 2004 | (Germany) Willingen | Mühlenkopfschanze K130 | LH |
| 19 | 2004–05 | 27 November 2004 | (Finland) Kuusamo | Rukatunturi HS142 | LH |
| 20 | 2004–05 | 28 November 2004 | (Finland) Kuusamo | Rukatunturi HS142 | LH |
| 21 | 2004–05 | 4 December 2004 | (Norway) Trondheim | Granåsen HS131 | LH |
| 22 | 2004–05 | 5 December 2004 | (Norway) Trondheim | Granåsen HS131 | LH |
| 23 | 2004–05 | 12 December 2004 | (Czech Republic) Harrachov | Čerťák HS142 | LH |
| 24 | 2004–05 | 18 December 2004 | (Switzerland) Engelberg | Gross-Titlis-Schanze HS137 | LH |
| 25 | 2004–05 | 19 December 2004 | (Switzerland) Engelberg | Gross-Titlis-Schanze HS137 | LH |
| 26 | 2004–05 | 29 December 2004 | (Germany) Oberstdorf | Schattenbergschanze HS137 | LH |
| 27 | 2004–05 | 1 January 2005 | (Germany) Garmisch-Partenkirchen | Große Olympiaschanze HS125 | LH |
| 28 | 2004–05 | 3 January 2005 | (Austria) Innsbruck | Bergiselschanze HS130 | LH |
| 29 | 2004–05 | 9 January 2005 | (Germany) Willingen | Mühlenkopfschanze HS145 | LH |
| 30 | 2004–05 | 22 January 2005 | (Germany) Titisee-Neustadt | Hochfirstschanze HS142 | LH |
| 31 | 2005–06 | 29 December 2005 | (Germany) Oberstdorf | Schattenbergschanze HS137 | LH |
| 32 | 2005–06 | 6 January 2006 | (Austria) Bischofshofen | Paul-Ausserleitner-Schanze HS140 | LH |
| 33 | 2007–08 | 5 January 2008 | (Austria) Bischofshofen | Paul-Ausserleitner-Schanze HS140 | LH |
| 34 | 2007–08 | 6 January 2008 | (Austria) Bischofshofen | Paul-Ausserleitner-Schanze HS140 | LH |
| 35 | 2007–08 | 20 January 2008 | (Czech Republic) Harrachov | Čerťák HS205 | FH |
| 36 | 2007–08 | 4 March 2008 | (Finland) Kuopio | Puijo HS127 | LH |

== Drag racing ==
Ahonen competes with his Ahonen Racing Team - ART in drag racing, winning the Finnish and Nordic Championships. His best performance in Top Fuel is 4.044 sec. 476.19 km/h in 2012.

== Personal life ==
Ahonen was married to Tiia Ahonen, with whom he has two sons, born in 2001 and 2008. His older son Mico is also a ski jumper. The couple parted in 2025.

== Autobiography ==
In 2009, the first edition of Ahonen's autobiography Kuningaskotka was published. The book was written in company with the journalist Pekka Holopainen. Ahonen reported about his childhood, jumping career and family life, but also about alcohol excesses and the radical diets in ski jumping.

== Bibliography ==
- Kuningaskotka (with Pekka Holopainen), 2009, ISBN 978-951-851-225-0

Olympic Games
| Preceded by Marja-Liisa Kirvesniemi | Flagbearer for Finland; Nagano 1998 | Succeeded by Toni Nieminen |
| Preceded by Enni Rukajärvi | Flagbearer for Finland; PyeongChang 2018 | Succeeded by Valtteri Filppula |
