= Bruder =

Bruder may refer to:

== People ==
Bruder is a surname. Notable people with the surname include:

- Aimee Bruder (born 1974), American Paralympic swimmer
- Charles Bruder, a victim of the Jersey Shore shark attacks of 1916
- Christian Bruder (born 1982), retired German ski jumper
- Doc Bruder (1901–1952), American football player
- Edith Bruder, French ethnologist specialized in the study of African Judaism and other religious societies
- Hank Bruder (1907–1970), American football player
- Harold Bruder (born 1930), American realist painter
- Holly Bruder, American college softball coach
- Jörg Bruder (1937–1973), Brazilian sailor and geology professor
- Jiří Bruder (1928–2014), Czech film, theatre and voice actor
- Patricia Bruder (born 1936), American actress
- Peter Bruder (1908–1976), American fencer
- Will Bruder (born 1946), American architect

== Business ==
- Bruder Spielwaren, a toy manufacturer

== See also ==
- Brüder, a 2001 EP by the German synthpop band Melotron
