= 2004–05 FIS Ski Jumping World Cup =

Ski jumping championship season

2004–05 World Cup
Winners
- Overall: (Finland) Janne Ahonen
- Four Hills Tournament: (Finland) Janne Ahonen
- Nordic Tournament: (Finland) Matti Hautamäki
- Nations Cup: Austria

Competitions
- Venues: 19
- Individual: 28
- Team: 3
- Rescheduled: 1

The 2004–05 FIS Ski Jumping World Cup was the 26th World Cup season in ski jumping and the unofficial World Cup season in ski flying with no small crystal globe awarded.

Season began in Kuusamo, Finland on 27 November 2004 and finished in Planica, Slovenia on 20 March 2005. The individual World Cup overall winner was Finnish ski jumper Janne Ahonen (who also won Four Hills Tournament), another Finnish Matti Hautamäki won Nordic Tournament and Nations Cup was taken by Team of Austria.

28 men's individual events on 19 different venues in 10 countries were held on the twoe different continents (Europe and Asia). First individual opening competition of the season in Kuusamo was rescheduled for two days due to bad weather. Also three men's team events were held. Three events in total were held only in one round due to bad weather conditions (two team events in Pragelato and Willingen and individual event in Sapporo).

Peaks of the season were FIS Nordic World Ski Championships, 4H and Nordic Tournament.

== World records ==
List of world record distances (both official and invalid) achieved within this World Cup season.

Date	Athlete	Hill	Round	Place	Metres	Feet
17 March 2005	(Austria) Andreas Widhölzl	Velikanka bratov Gorišek HS215	Training – R1	Planica, Slovenia	234.5	769
20 March 2005	(Norway) Tommy Ingebrigtsen	Velikanka bratov Gorišek HS215	Round 2	Planica, Slovenia	231	758
20 March 2005	(Norway) Bjørn Einar Romøren	Velikanka bratov Gorišek HS215	Round 2	Planica, Slovenia	234.5	769
20 March 2005	(Finland) Matti Hautamäki	Velikanka bratov Gorišek HS215	Round 2	Planica, Slovenia	235.5	773
20 March 2005	(Norway) Bjørn Einar Romøren	Velikanka bratov Gorišek HS215	Round 2	Planica, Slovenia	239	784
20 March 2005	(Finland) Janne Ahonen	Velikanka bratov Gorišek HS215	Round 2	Planica, Slovenia	240	787

Longest jump in history at that time, but invalid due to Widhölzl and Ahonen both crashed upon landing.

== Map of world cup hosts ==
Europe
Germany	Austria	Asia

== Calendar ==
=== Men's Individual ===
N – normal hill / L – large hill / F – flying hill
All	No.	Date	Place (Hill)	Size	Winner	Second	Third	Overall leader	R.
		26 November 2004	(Finland) Kuusamo; Rukatunturi HS142)	L _{cnx}	cancelled due to strong wind and rescheduled on a day after			—	
582	1	27 November 2004	(Finland) Kuusamo; Rukatunturi HS142)	L _{386}	(Finland) Janne Ahonen	(Germany) Alexander Herr	(Austria) Martin Höllwarth	(Finland) Janne Ahonen	
583	2	28 November 2004	(Finland) Kuusamo; Rukatunturi HS142)	L _{387}	(Finland) Janne Ahonen	(Austria) Thomas Morgenstern	(Czech Republic) Jakub Janda	(Finland) Janne Ahonen	
584	3	4 December 2004	(Norway) Trondheim (Granåsen HS131)	L _{388}	(Finland) Janne Ahonen	(Czech Republic) Jakub Janda	(Austria) Andreas Widhölzl	(Finland) Janne Ahonen	
585	4	5 December 2004	(Norway) Trondheim (Granåsen HS131)	L _{389}	(Finland) Janne Ahonen	(Austria) Martin Höllwarth	(Austria) Andreas Widhölzl	(Finland) Janne Ahonen	
586	5	11 December 2004	(Czech Republic) Harrachov (Čerťák HS142)	L _{390}	(Poland) Adam Małysz	(Finland) Janne Ahonen	(Germany) Georg Späth	(Finland) Janne Ahonen	
587	6	12 December 2004	(Czech Republic) Harrachov (Čerťák HS142)	L _{391}	(Finland) Janne Ahonen	(Norway) Roar Ljøkelsøy	(Czech Republic) Jakub Janda	(Finland) Janne Ahonen	
588	7	18 December 2004	(Switzerland) Engelberg (Gross-Titlis-Schanze HS137)	L _{392}	(Finland) Janne Ahonen	(Austria) Thomas Morgenstern	(Czech Republic) Jakub Janda	(Finland) Janne Ahonen	
589	8	19 December 2004	(Switzerland) Engelberg (Gross-Titlis-Schanze HS137)	L _{393}	(Finland) Janne Ahonen	(Czech Republic) Jakub Janda	(Austria) Martin Höllwarth	(Finland) Janne Ahonen	
590	9	29 December 2004	(Germany) Oberstdorf (Schattenbergschanze HS137)	L _{394}	(Finland) Janne Ahonen	(Norway) Roar Ljøkelsøy	(Poland) Adam Małysz	(Finland) Janne Ahonen	
591	10	1 January 2005	(Germany) Garmisch-Pa (Große Olympiaschanze HS125)	L _{395}	(Finland) Janne Ahonen	(Austria) Thomas Morgenstern	(Germany) Georg Späth	(Finland) Janne Ahonen	
592	11	3 January 2005	(Austria) Innsbruck (Bergiselschanze HS130)	L _{396}	(Finland) Janne Ahonen	(Poland) Adam Małysz	(Czech Republic) Jakub Janda	(Finland) Janne Ahonen	
593	12	6 January 2005	(Austria) Bischofshofen (Paul-Ausserleitner HS140)	L _{397}	(Austria) Martin Höllwarth	(Finland) Janne Ahonen	(Japan) Daiki Itō	(Finland) Janne Ahonen	
53rd Four Hills Tournament Overall (29 December 2004 – 6 January 2005)					(Finland) Janne Ahonen	(Austria) Martin Höllwarth	(Austria) Thomas Morgenstern	4H Tournament	
594	13	9 January 2005	(Germany) Willingen (Mühlenkopfschanze HS145)	L _{398}	(Finland) Janne Ahonen	(Austria) Martin Höllwarth	(Switzerland) Andreas Küttel	(Finland) Janne Ahonen	
595	14	15 January 2005	(Austria) Bad Mitterndorf (Kulm HS200)	F _{057}	(Austria) Andreas Widhölzl	(Norway) Roar Ljøkelsøy	(Poland) Adam Małysz	(Finland) Janne Ahonen	
596	15	16 January 2005	(Austria) Bad Mitterndorf (Kulm HS200)	F _{058}	(Poland) Adam Małysz	(Austria) Andreas Widhölzl	(Finland) Risto Jussilainen	(Finland) Janne Ahonen	
597	16	22 January 2005	(Germany) Titisee-Neustadt (Hochfirstschanze HS142))	L _{399}	(Finland) Janne Ahonen	(Czech Republic) Jakub Janda	(Austria) Thomas Morgenstern	(Finland) Janne Ahonen	
598	17	23 January 2005	(Germany) Titisee-Neustadt (Hochfirstschanze HS142))	L _{400}	(Czech Republic) Jakub Janda	(Poland) Adam Małysz	(Finland) Risto Jussilainen	(Finland) Janne Ahonen	
599	18	29 January 2005	(Poland) Zakopane (Wielka Krokiew HS134)	L _{401}	(Poland) Adam Małysz (Norway) Roar Ljøkelsøy		(Finland) Risto Jussilainen	(Finland) Janne Ahonen	
600	19	30 January 2005	(Poland) Zakopane (Wielka Krokiew HS134)	L _{402}	(Poland) Adam Małysz	(Finland) Janne Ahonen	(Norway) Roar Ljøkelsøy	(Finland) Janne Ahonen	
601	20	5 February 2005	(Japan) Sapporo (Ōkurayama HS134)	L _{403}	(Japan) Kazuyoshi Funaki	(Austria) Thomas Morgenstern	(Norway) Roar Ljøkelsøy	(Finland) Janne Ahonen	
602	21	6 February 2005	(Japan) Sapporo (Ōkurayama HS134)	L _{404}	(Norway) Roar Ljøkelsøy	(Finland) Risto Jussilainen	(Austria) Thomas Morgenstern	(Finland) Janne Ahonen	
603	22	11 February 2005	(Italy) Pragelato (Stadio del Trampolino HS140)	L _{405}	(Finland) Matti Hautamäki	(Germany) Michael Uhrmann	(Austria) Thomas Morgenstern	(Finland) Janne Ahonen	
FIS Nordic World Ski Championships 2005 (19 – 25 February • (Germany) Oberstdorf)
604	23	6 March 2005	(Finland) Lahti (Salpausselkä HS130)	L _{406}	(Finland) Matti Hautamäki	(Norway) Roar Ljøkelsøy	(Austria) Thomas Morgenstern	(Finland) Janne Ahonen	
605	24	9 March 2005	(Finland) Kuopio (Puijo HS127)	L _{407}	(Finland) Matti Hautamäki	(Norway) Roar Ljøkelsøy	(Poland) Adam Małysz (Czech Republic) Jakub Janda	(Finland) Janne Ahonen	
606	25	11 March 2005	(Norway) Lillehammer (Lysgårdsbakken HS138)	L	(Finland) Matti Hautamäki	(Norway) Sigurd Pettersen	(Norway) Lars Bystøl	(Finland) Janne Ahonen	
607	26	13 March 2005	(Norway) Oslo (Holmenkollbakken HS128))	L _{409}	(Finland) Matti Hautamäki	(Norway) Bjørn Einar Romøren	(Germany) Michael Uhrmann	(Finland) Janne Ahonen	
9th Nordic Tournament Overall (6 – 13 March 2005))					(Finland) Matti Hautamäki	(Norway) Roar Ljøkelsøy	(Germany) Michael Uhrmann	Nordic Tournament	
608	27	19 March 2005	(Slovenia) Planica (Letalnica bratov Gorišek HS215)	F _{059}	(Finland) Matti Hautamäki	(Austria) Andreas Widhölzl	(Norway) Bjørn Einar Romøren	(Finland) Janne Ahonen	
609	28	20 March 2005	(Slovenia) Planica (Letalnica bratov Gorišek HS215)	F _{060}	(Norway) Bjørn Einar Romøren	(Norway) Roar Ljøkelsøy	(Austria) Andreas Widhölzl	(Finland) Janne Ahonen	
26th FIS World Cup Overall (24 November 2000 – 20 March 2005)					(Finland) Janne Ahonen	(Norway) Roar Ljøkelsøy	(Finland) Matti Hautamäki	World Cup Overall	

=== Men's Team ===
All	No.	Date	Place (Hill)	Size	Winner	Second	Third	R.
30	1	8 January 2005	(Germany) Willingen (Mühlenkopfschanze HS145)	L _{025}	Germany Georg Späth; Michael Uhrmann; Alexander Herr; Maximilian Mechler	Finland Janne Ahonen; Risto Jussilainen; Matti Hautamäki; Tami Kiuru	Austria Andreas Widhölzl; Thomas Morgenstern; Wolfgang Loitzl; Martin Höllwarth	
31	2	12 February 2005	(Italy) Pragelato (Stadio del Trampolino HS140)	L _{026}	Austria Wolfgang Loitzl; Andreas Widhölzl; Thomas Morgenstern; Martin Höllwarth	Slovenia Jernej Damjan; Rok Benkovič; Robert Kranjec; Primož Peterka	Germany Martin Schmitt; Jörg Ritzerfeld; Michael Uhrmann; Stephan Hocke	
32	3	5 March 2005	(Finland) Lahti (Salpausselkä HS130)	L _{027}	Norway Roar Ljøkelsøy; Bjørn Einar Romøren; Henning Stensrud; Daniel Forfang	Finland Matti Hautamäki; Janne Ahonen; Risto Jussilainen; Jussi Hautamäki	Austria Wolfgang Loitzl; Martin Höllwarth; Florian Liegl; Thomas Morgenstern	

== Standings ==
=== Overall ===
Rank	after 28 events	Points
1	(Finland) Janne Ahonen	1715
2	(Norway) Roar Ljøkelsøy	1440
3	(Finland) Matti Hautamäki	1275
4	(Poland) Adam Małysz	1201
5	(Austria) Martin Höllwarth	1179
6	(Czech Republic) Jakub Janda	1164
7	(Austria) Thomas Morgenstern	1138
8	(Austria) Andreas Widhölzl	999
9	(Germany) Michael Uhrmann	804
10	(Norway) Lars Bystøl	613

=== Nations Cup ===
Rank	after 31 events	Points
1	Austria	5102
2	Finland	4771
3	Norway	4124
4	Germany	3327
5	Japan	1820
6	Slovenia	1727
7	Poland	1630
8	Czech Republic	1406
9	Switzerland	943
10	Russia	677

=== Prize money ===
Rank	after 31 events	CHF
1	(Finland) Janne Ahonen	335,500
2	(Finland) Matti Hautamäki	187,500
3	(Norway) Roar Ljøkelsøy	161,000
4	(Poland) Adam Małysz	140,150
5	(Austria) Martin Höllwarth	120,000
6	(Czech Republic) Jakub Janda	119,500
7	(Austria) Thomas Morgenstern	113,000
8	(Austria) Andreas Widhölzl	95,200
9	(Germany) Michael Uhrmann	53,000
10	(Norway) Bjørn Einar Romøren	52,000

=== Four Hills Tournament ===
Rank	after 4 events	Points
1	(Finland) Janne Ahonen	1043.3
2	(Austria) Martin Höllwarth	994.2
3	(Austria) Thomas Morgenstern	985.5
4	(Poland) Adam Małysz	985.3
5	(Czech Republic) Jakub Janda	972.8
6	(Norway) Roar Ljøkelsøy	969.7
7	(Japan) Daiki Itō	962.7
8	(Germany) Michael Uhrmann	939.0
9	(Germany) Georg Späth	928.5
10	(Finland) Matti Hautamäki	922.2

=== Nordic Tournament ===
Rank	after 4 events	Points
1	(Finland) Matti Hautamäki	1103.0
2	(Norway) Roar Ljøkelsøy	1055.4
3	(Germany) Michael Uhrmann	1032.7
4	(Norway) Lars Bystøl	1026.9
5	(Finland) Janne Ahonen	1011.1
6	(Czech Republic) Jakub Janda	1008.5
7	(Slovenia) Rok Benkovič	1002.1
8	(Austria) Thomas Morgenstern	1000.2
9	(Norway) Bjørn Einar Romøren	985.6
10	(Switzerland) Andreas Küttel	977.8

== See also ==
- 2004 Grand Prix (top level summer series)
- 2004–05 FIS Continental Cup (2nd level competition)
