= Monika Pogladič =

Slovenian ski jumper (born 1987)

Personal information
- Born: 5 April 1987 (age 39)

Sport
- Country: Slovenia
- Sport: Skiing

World Cup career
- Seasons: 2004–2007
Medal record
Ski jumping
Representing Slovenia
FIS Ski Jumping Continental Cup
Bronze medal – third place	2004 Park City	Women's ski jump
Bronze medal – third place	2005 Planica	Women's ski jump
Gold medal – first place	2005 Baiersbronn	Women's ski jump
Silver medal – second place	2005 Baiersbronn	Women's team ski jump
Winter Universiade
Silver medal – second place	2005 Innsbruck	Women's ski jump

Monika Pogladič (born 5 April 1987), also known by her married name Marčinković is a Slovenian former ski jumper. In the 2004–05 FIS Ski Jumping Continental Cup, she won one event and came third in two individual events, as well as second in the Continental Cup's team event.

== Personal life ==
Pogladič is from Ljubno ob Savinji, Slovenia. She is married and has two children.

== Career ==
Pogladič started training in Mislinja and later trained in Ljubno ob Savinji.

In 2004, she competed at the first FIS Ski Jumping Continental Cup event at Utah Olympic Park, US. She finished third in the first event. She won the 2004–05 FIS Ski Jumping Continental Cup event in Baiersbronn, Germany, making her the first Slovenian to win the event. She finished ahead of Maja Vtič, the first time that Pogladič had beaten Vtič in a ski jumping event. Pogladič was part of the Slovenian team that came second in the ski jumping team event in Baiersbronn, alongside Anja Tepeš, Petra Benedik and Maja Vtič. Pogladič also came third in an individual event at the 2004–05 Continental Cup event in Planica, Slovenia. In 2004, she also won a summer grand prix event. Pogladič came second in the ski jumping event at the 2005 Winter Universiade.

Pogladič retired from ski jumping in 2007, after two nasty falls. She continues to attend ski jumping events in Ljubno ob Savinji, and in 2012 competed at a show event in Žireh.
