= Jure Bogataj =

Slovenian ski jumper

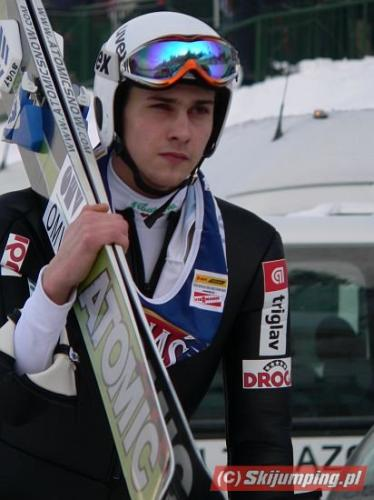
- Bogataj in 2005

Personal information
- Full name: Jure Bogataj
- Nationality: Slovenia
- Born: 26 April 1985 (age 41) Kranj, Yugoslavia

Sport
- Sport: Skiing

World Cup career
- Seasons: 2004–2005, 2008
Medal record
Men's ski jumping
Representing Slovenia
World Championships
Bronze medal – third place	2005 Oberstdorf	Team normal hill
- Updated on 13 May 2015

Jure Bogataj (born 26 April 1985) is a Slovenian former ski jumper who competed from 2002 to 2011. He won a bronze medal in the team normal hill event at the 2005 FIS Nordic World Ski Championships in Oberstdorf and finished 28th in the individual large hill at those same championships.
