= Ildar Fatchullin =

Russian-Tatar former ski jumper

Ildar Fatkullin Илдар Фәтхуллин Ильдар Фаткуллин
Personal information
- Full name: Ildar Railevich Fatkullin
- Nationality: Russia
- Born: 16 October 1982 (age 43) Soviet Union
- Height: 165 cm (5 ft 5 in)

Sport
- Sport: Skiing

World Cup career
- Seasons: 2000–2003; 2005–2007
- Indiv. starts: 43
- Updated on 15 January 2016

Ildar Railevich Fatkullin (Tatar: Илдар Раил улы Фәтхуллин; Russian: Ильдар Райильевич Фаткуллин; born 16 October 1982) is a Tatar former ski jumper who competed from 1999 to 2007. His best individual World Cup finish was eighth in a large hill competition in Oberstdorf on 30 December 2001, and his best individual career finish was fourth in a normal hill Grand Prix competition in Hinterzarten on 7 August 2005.

At the 2002 Winter Olympics in Salt Lake City, Ildar Fatkullin finished 35th in the individual large hill competition. At the 2006 Winter Olympics in Pragelato, he finished eighth with the Russian national team in the large hill team competition.

Ildar Fatkullin's best finish at the World Championships was fifth in the normal hill team competition (2005, Oberstdorf) and eleventh in the individual normal hill competition (2001, Lahti). At the 2006 Ski Flying World Championships in Kulm, he finished seventh in the team and 32nd in the individual competitions.
