= Petr Chaadaev (ski jumper) =

Belarusian ski jumper (born 1987)

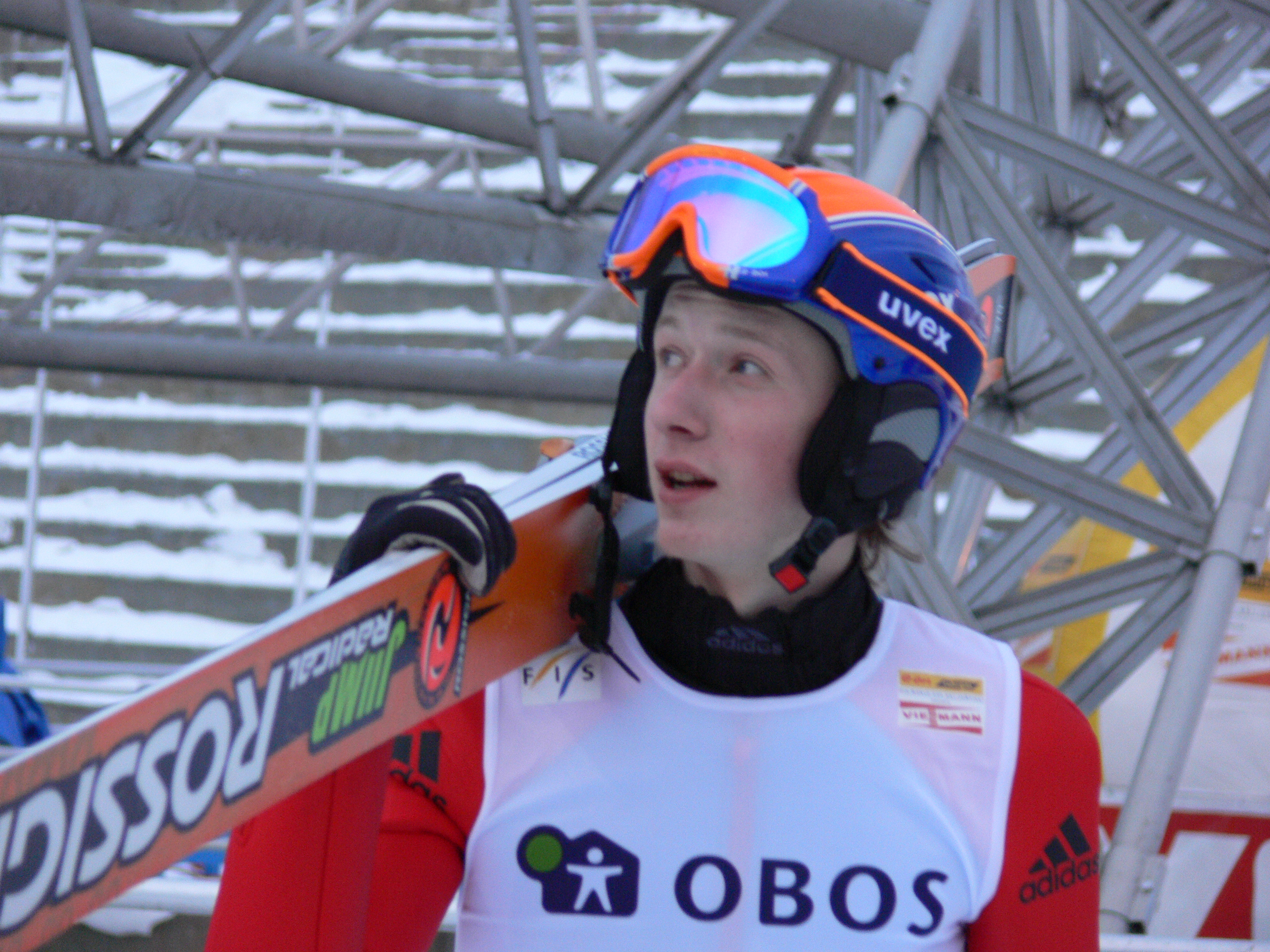
Petr Chaadaev, Holmenkollen 2006

Petr Chaadaev (Russian: Пётр Чаадаев, born January 21, 1987, Moscow) is a Belarusian ski jumper who has competed since 2001.

Petr made his debut on November 17, 2001. He started in the Nordic Ski WC in Oberstdorf.

On February 10, 2005, he was 56th in the qualification. In the team competition the Belarusian team was 15th. Ivan Sobolev, Dmitry Afanasenko, Maksim Anisimov and Chaadaev came in last.

In this season, in Bad Mitterndorf he jumped a new Belarusian record, his jump was 197.5 metres long. In Torino Olympics 2006, Chaadaev was disqualified in the qualification, and they didn't start a team.
