= Jakub Janda =

Czech ski jumper and politician

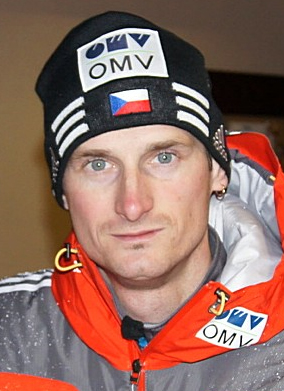
- Janda in 2011

Personal information
- Nationality: Czech Republic
- Born: 27 April 1978 (age 48) Čeladná, Czechoslovakia
- Height: 1.78 m (5 ft 10 in)

Sport
- Sport: Skiing

World Cup career
- Seasons: 1996–2018
- Indiv. starts: 361
- Indiv. podiums: 20
- Indiv. wins: 6
- Team starts: 47
- Overall titles: 1 (2006)
- Four Hills titles: 1 (2006)

Achievements and titles
- Personal bests: 218 m (715 ft); Vikersund, 25 Feb 2012
Medal record
Men's ski jumping
World Championships
Gold medal – first place	2005-06 season	overall
Silver medal – second place	2005 Oberstdorf	Individual NH
Bronze medal – third place	2005 Oberstdorf	Individual LH
- Updated on 17 November 2017

Jakub Janda (Czech pronunciation: [ˈjakup ˈjanda]; born 27 April 1978) is a Czech politician and former ski jumper. In ski jumping he competed from 1996 to 2017, winning the gold medal in the 2005–06 FIS Ski Jumping World Cup as the 2006 World Champion. He also won the 2005/06 Four Hills Tournament (shared with Janne Ahonen), as well as silver and bronze medals at the 2005 World Championships. Janda is one of the most successful ski jumpers from the Czech Republic, and is the only Czech World Cup champion to date.

At the 2017 Czech legislative election, he was elected to the Chamber of Deputies representing the Civic Democratic Party.

== Ski jumping career ==
Janda made his World Cup debut in 1996. He had his first major success in 2003, finishing in third place in Liberec. Janda improved his performance under new Slovenian coach Vasja Bajc in 2004. In the 2004–05 season he took several second and third places and one victory in World Cup events. He also won a silver and a bronze medal at the 2005 FIS Nordic World Ski Championships in Oberstdorf.

Janda started the 2005/06 season with World Cup wins in Kuusamo, Lillehammer, Harrachov and Engelberg, and entered the Four Hills Tournament leading the World Cup standings. In the opening event in Oberstdorf, Janda finished in third place, with Janne Ahonen in first and Roar Ljøkelsøy in second. After winning the second race of the Tournament in Garmisch-Partenkirchen, Janda moved to second place in the standings behind the reigning Tournament champion Ahonen. Norway's Lars Bystøl was the unexpected winner in Innsbruck while Janda finished ahead of Ahonen again to move into a two-point lead before the last competition. Like in all previous rounds, Janda advanced in last place into the competition to having skis that were too long during Oberstdorf qualifying and could not participate in the next three qualifying rounds as a result. The tournament climaxed with a head-to-head knockout duel between Janda and Ahonen. Janda won the first round by one point (tied to Ahonen on meters), then increased his lead to three points before the last jump. Ahonen beat Janda in the last jump by 141.5 meters to 139 meters and won the Bischofshofen competition by two points. The overall standings thus had both jumpers tied for first place, the first ever joint victors in the history of the tournament. Norway's Ljøkelsøy finished third. Janda was the first Czech winner of the Tournament since Jiří Raška in 1971.

Janda then experienced a drop of form, leading to poor results at the 2006 Winter Olympics in Turin, finishing 13th in the individual normal hill, 10th in the individual large hill and 9th in the team large hill.

After the Olympics he returned to the podium in the World Cup event (2nd place in Lahti), but his form was less solid than at the beginning of the season. His biggest rival Janne Ahonen tried to take advantage of it, but also struggled and after disappointing Lahti results on the eve of the end of the season, he decided to withdraw from one race of the World Cup to concentrate on the last events in Norway and on mammoth hill in Planica.

Janda's lead grew to 175 points with 200 points to gain in the last round in Planica. Janda announced he did not want to participate in the ski flying event (he finished only seventh in the Ski Flying World Championships just after the Four Hills Tournament), but had to compete in Planica to secure his overall title. Qualifying last to the final round of the first of two Planica races and finishing 29th after the second jump, he was helped by Ahonen, who did not reach a better result than 11th place.

Janda did not enter the last race and finished the World Cup standings with 1151 points, still 127 ahead of Ahonen. He was the first Czech to win the ski jumping World Cup, and the first to win the Olympic discipline World Cup standings.

Coach Vasja Bajc ended his relationship with the Czech team after the season and was replaced by an Austrian, Richard Schallert.

Janda has competed in three Winter Olympics, earning his best finish of seventh in the team large hill event at Vancouver in 2010 while his best individual finish was 13th in the individual normal hill event at Turin four years earlier.

On 2 October 2017 he made his last official career jump when he stuck at the qualification round of Grand Prix season final competition in Klingenthal. He was elected to the Czech parliament three weeks later.

== Political career ==
Janda participated in the 2017 Czech legislative election and was elected into the parliament as a candidate of the Civic Democratic Party. Upon his election, he retired from ski jumping.

== World Cup ==
=== Standings ===
Season	Overall	4H	SF	RA	W5	NT	JP
1995/96	—	—	—	N/A	N/A	N/A	—
1996/97	96	—	—	N/A	N/A	48	92
1997/98	70	52	38	N/A	N/A	63	72
1998/99	47	50	—	N/A	N/A	—	46
1999/00	70	—	—	N/A	N/A	—	70
2000/01	35	71	34	N/A	N/A	21	N/A
2001/02	32	37	N/A	N/A	N/A	—	N/A
2002/03	25	37	N/A	N/A	N/A	14	N/A
2003/04	39	54	N/A	N/A	N/A	17	N/A
2004/05	6	5	N/A	N/A	N/A	6	N/A
2005/06	1st place, gold medalist(s)	1st place, gold medalist(s)	N/A	N/A	N/A	6	N/A
2006/07	22	19	N/A	N/A	N/A	25	N/A
2007/08	49	25	N/A	N/A	N/A	57	N/A
2008/09	22	22	45	N/A	N/A	20	N/A
2009/10	22	26	—	N/A	N/A	15	N/A
2010/11	34	33	29	N/A	N/A	N/A	N/A
2011/12	25	12	34	N/A	N/A	N/A	N/A
2012/13	62	—	—	N/A	N/A	N/A	N/A
2013/14	28	46	25	N/A	N/A	N/A	N/A
2014/15	56	46	—	N/A	N/A	N/A	N/A
2015/16	32	21	—	N/A	N/A	N/A	N/A
2016/17	38	16	—	51	N/A	N/A	N/A
2017/18	—	—	—	—	—	N/A	N/A

=== Wins ===
No.	Season	Date	Location	Hill	Size
1	2004/05	23 January 2005	(Germany) Titisee-Neustadt	Hochfirstschanze HS142	LH
2	2005/06	26 November 2005	(Finland) Kuusamo	Rukatunturi HS142 (night)	LH
3	2005/06	4 December 2005	(Norway) Lillehammer	Lysgårdsbakken HS138	LH
4	2005/06	11 December 2005	(Czech Republic) Harrachov	Čerťák HS142	LH
5	2005/06	18 December 2005	(Switzerland) Engelberg	Gross-Titlis-Schanze HS137	LH
6	2005/06	1 January 2006	(Germany) Garmisch-Partenkirchen	Große Olympiaschanze HS137 (night)	LH
