= Rok Benkovič =

Slovenian ski jumper

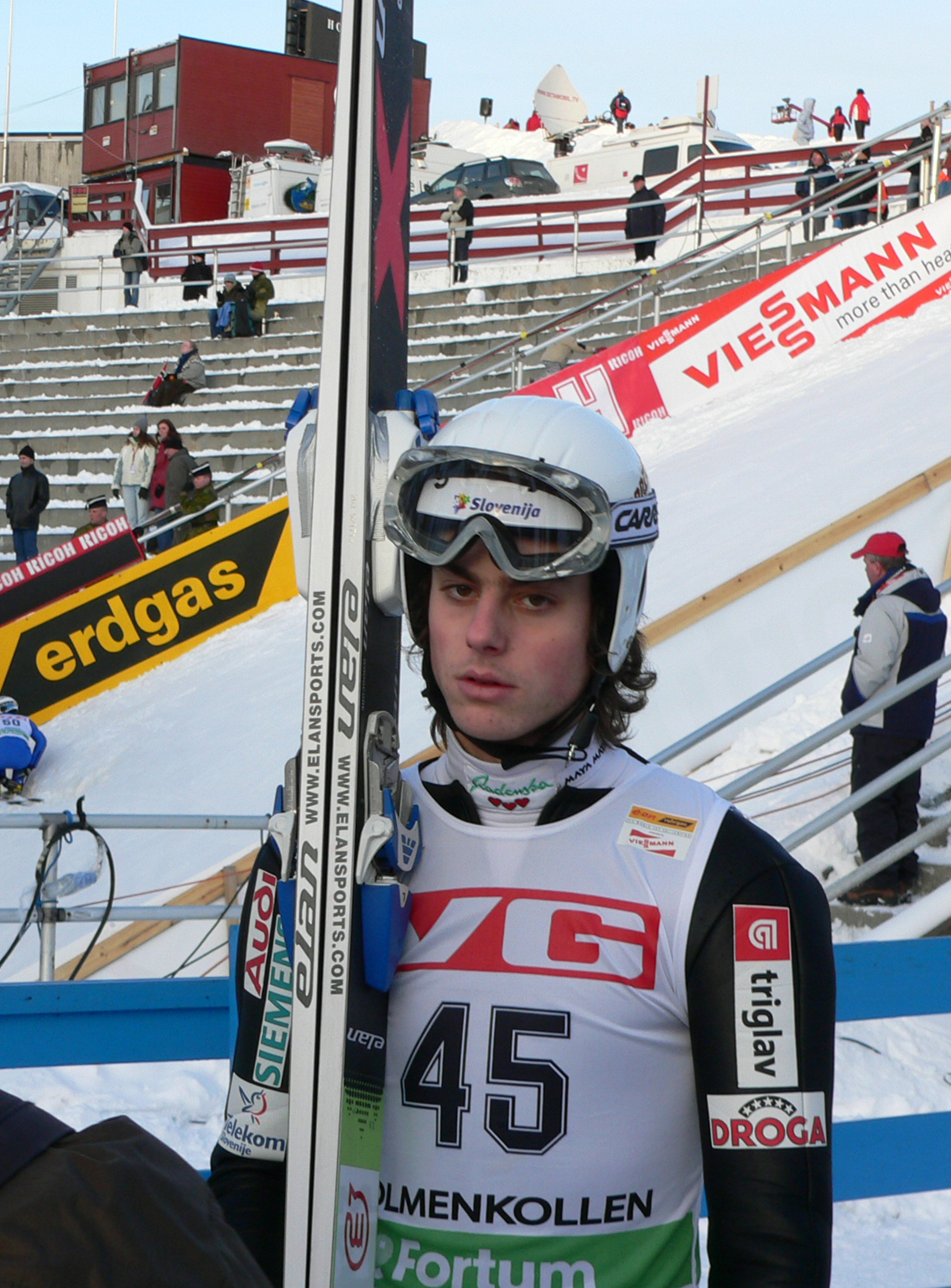
- Benkovič at Oslo, 2005

Personal information
- Nationality: Slovenia
- Born: 20 March 1986 (age 40) Ljubljana, SR Slovenia, SFR Yugoslavia

Sport
- Sport: Skiing

World Cup career
- Seasons: 2001–2007
- Team podiums: 1

Achievements and titles
- Personal bests: 226 m (741 ft); Planica, 20 Mar 2005
Medal record
Men's ski jumping
World Championships
Gold medal – first place	2005 Oberstdorf	Individual normal hill
Bronze medal – third place	2005 Oberstdorf	Team normal hill
- Updated on 13 March 2015

Rok Benkovič (born 20 March 1986) is a Slovenian former ski jumper who competed from 2001 to 2007.

Benkovič started with his sport career at the relatively advanced age of eleven, when he first participated in ski jumping in 1997. In Sollefteå, Sweden, he won the silver medal at the Junior World Championship on 6 February 2003. His biggest success came at the 2005 FIS Nordic World Ski Championships in Oberstdorf, where he won the individual normal hill on 19 February 2005, making him the second Slovenian to win a gold medal after that of Franci Petek in 1991. The very next day, he won a bronze medal for the Slovenians in a team normal hill competition involving Primož Peterka, Jure Bogataj and Jernej Damjan.

He also competed at the 2006 Winter Olympics in Turin, finishing 10th in the team large hill, 29th in the individual large hill, and 49th in the individual normal hill.

From 2005 to 2007, Benkovič held the Slovenian national distance record of 226 metres, set in Planica. This was broken by countryman Robert Kranjec, who jumped 229 m. In May 2007 Benkovič retired from ski jumping.

== Career ==
=== Olympic Games ===
Event	Normal Hill	Large Hill	Team
Representing Slovenia
(Italy) 2006 Turin	49th	29th	10th

=== World Championships ===
2 medals (1 gold, 1 bronze)

Event	Normal Hill	Large Hill	Team (NH)	Team (LH)	Mixed Team
Representing Slovenia
(Italy) 2003 Val di Fiemme	31st	23rd	—N/a	6th	—N/a
(Germany) 2005 Oberstdorf	Gold	5th	Bronze	4th	—N/a
(Japan) 2007 Sapporo	27th	—	—N/a	—	—N/a

=== Ski-Flying World Championships ===
Event	Individual	Team
Representing Slovenia
(Slovenia) 2004 Planica	21st	6th
(Austria) 2006 Tauplitz/Bad Mitterndorf	27th	5th

=== World Cup ===
==== Standings ====
Season	Overall	4H	NT
2001/02	77	—	—
2002/03	41	63	16
2003/04	17	19	8
2004/05	19	34	7
2005/06	26	12	60
2006/07	63	51	49
