= Ferdinand Bader =

German ski jumper

Personal information
- Born: 21 May 1981 (age 45) Freising, West Germany

Sport
- Sport: Skiing
- Club: SC Auerbach

World Cup career
- Seasons: 2004-2005
- Indiv. wins: 0
- Updated on 23 December 2007

Ferdinand Bader (born 21 May 1981) is a retired German ski jumper.

In the World Cup he finished once among the top 10, his best result being a fifth place from Sapporo in February 2005.
