= Tsuyoshi Ichinohe =

Japanese ski jumper (born 1976)

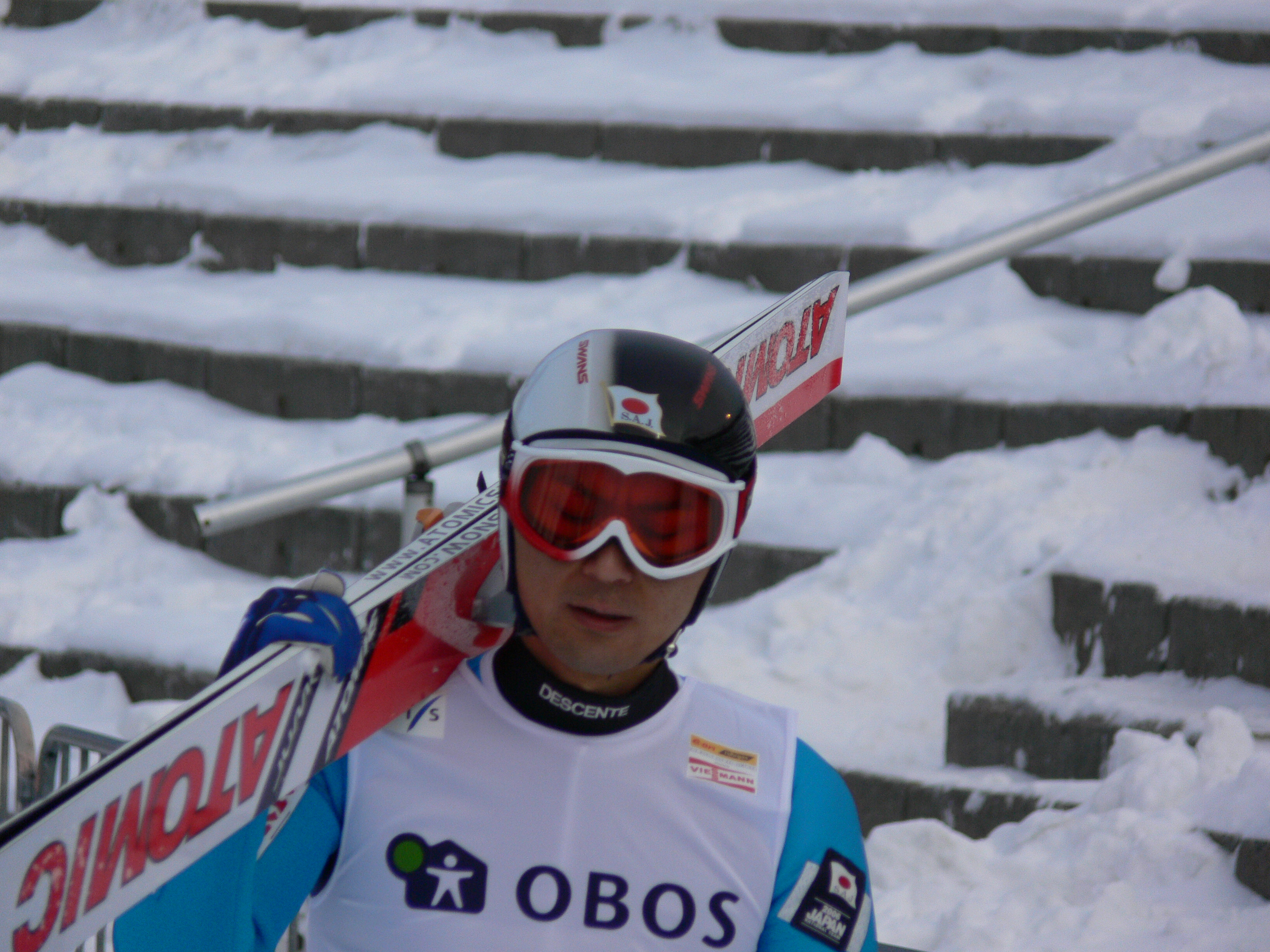

Personal information
- Born: 9 June 1976 (age 50)

Sport
- Sport: Skiing
- Club: Eins

World Cup career
- Seasons: 2003-2006
- Indiv. wins: 0

Tsuyoshi Ichinohe (一戸 剛, Ichinohe Tsuyoshi; born 9 June 1976) is a Japanese ski jumper.

In the World Cup his highest place in an individual event was number 14 from January 2006 in Sapporo.

He participated in the 2006 Winter Olympics held in Pragelato near Turin, where he finished 25th in the large hill and 6th in the team event.
