= Martin Höllwarth =

Austrian ski jumper (born 1974)

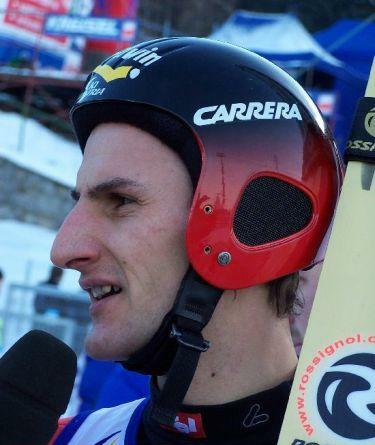

Personal information
- Nationality: Austria
- Born: 13 April 1974 (age 52) Schwaz, Austria
- Height: 182 cm (6 ft 0 in)

Sport
- Sport: Skiing

World Cup career
- Seasons: 1992–2008
- Indiv. starts: 307
- Indiv. podiums: 29
- Indiv. wins: 8
- Team starts: 17
- Team podiums: 12
- Team wins: 6

Achievements and titles
- Personal bests: 222.5 m (730 ft); Planica, 20 March 2005
Medal record
Men's ski jumping
Olympic Games
Silver medal – second place	1992 Albertville	Individual NH
Silver medal – second place	1992 Albertville	Individual LH
Silver medal – second place	1992 Albertville	Team LH
Bronze medal – third place	1998 Nagano	Team LH
FIS Nordic World Ski Championships
Gold medal – first place	2001 Lahti	Team NH
Gold medal – first place	2005 Oberstdorf	Team NH
Gold medal – first place	2005 Oberstdorf	Team LH
Bronze medal – third place	1999 Ramsau	Team LH
Bronze medal – third place	2001 Lahti	Individual NH
Bronze medal – third place	2001 Lahti	Team LH
- Updated on 10 February 2016

Martin Höllwarth (born 13 April 1974) is an Austrian former ski jumper.

== Career ==
At the 1992 Winter Olympics in Albertville, he won three silver medals. At the 1998 Winter Olympics in Nagano, he won bronze in the team large hill competition. Höllwarth's biggest successes were at the FIS Nordic World Ski Championships where he earned six medals, including three golds (team normal hill in 2001 and 2005; team large hill in 2005) and three bronzes (individual normal hill in 2001; team large hill in 1999 and 2001).

On 4 February 2001, whilst returning from an event in Willingen, a car driven by Höllwarth was involved in an accident in which Austrian coach Alois Lipburger died. Höllwarth and another passenger, fellow ski jumper and countryman Andreas Widhölzl, escaped with minor injuries.

Höllwarth announced his retirement at the 2007/08 season.

== World Cup ==
=== Standings ===
Season	Overall	4H	SF	NT	JP
1991/92	10	2	—	N/A	N/A
1992/93	13	12	—	N/A	N/A
1993/94	90	50	—	N/A	N/A
1994/95	53	36	38	N/A	N/A
1995/96	26	15	—	N/A	26
1996/97	19	21	43	20	18
1997/98	11	14	24	14	11
1998/99	18	29	27	14	19
1999/00	16	54	7	4	17
2000/01	13	8	11	39	N/A
2001/02	6	3rd place, bronze medalist(s)	N/A	27	N/A
2002/03	6	7	N/A	5	N/A
2003/04	5	2nd place, silver medalist(s)	N/A	—	N/A
2004/05	5	2nd place, silver medalist(s)	N/A	14	N/A
2005/06	40	29	N/A	39	N/A
2006/07	18	13	N/A	37	N/A
2007/08	53	45	N/A	—	N/A

=== Wins ===
No.	Season	Date	Location	Hill	Size
1	1991/92	10 January 1992	(Italy) Predazzo	Trampolino dal Ben K90	NH
2	1992/93	19 December 1992	(Japan) Sapporo	Miyanomori K90	NH
3	1996/97	1 February 1997	(Germany) Willingen	Mühlenkopfschanze K120	LH
4	2002/03	7 December 2002	(Norway) Trondheim	Granåsen K120 (night)	LH
5	2002/03	14 December 2002	(Germany) Titisee-Neustadt	Hochfirstschanze K120	LH
6	2002/03	15 December 2002	(Germany) Titisee-Neustadt	Hochfirstschanze K120	LH
7	2003/04	18 January 2004	(Poland) Zakopane	Wielka Krokiew K120	LH
8	2004/05	6 January 2005	(Austria) Bischofshofen	Paul-Ausserleitner HS140 (night)	LH

== Ski jumping world record ==
Date	Hill	Location	Metres	Feet
17 March 1994	Velikanka bratov Gorišek K185	Planica, Slovenia	196	643

Records
Preceded by Piotr Fijas	World's longest ski jump 17 March 1994 – 17 March 1994	Succeeded by Toni Nieminen
