= Dimitry Ipatov =

Russian ski jumper (born 1984)

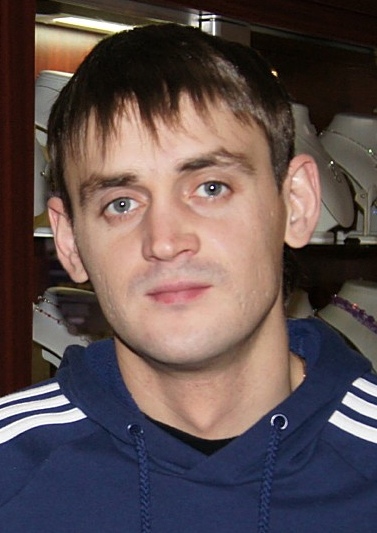

Personal information
- Full name: Dimitry Ipatov
- Nickname: Ipat
- Citizenship: Russia; Malta
- Born: 30 June 1984 (age 42) Magadan, Russia
- Height: 175 cm (5 ft 9 in)

Sport
- Sport: Skiing
- Club: Osvsm/Magadan

World Cup career
- Seasons: 2002–
- Indiv. podiums: 0
- Indiv. wins: 0

Achievements and titles
- Personal best: 204

Dimitry Gennadyevich Ipatov (Russian: Дмитрий Геннадьевич Ипатов) (born 30 June 1984 in Magadan) is a Russian ski jumper who has been competing since 2002. Competing in two Winter Olympics, he earned his best finish of eighth in the team large hill event at Turin in 2006.

Ipatov's best finish at the FIS Nordic World Ski Championships was fifth in the team normal hill at the 2005 championships in Oberstdorf while his best individual finish was ninth at Sapporo in 2007.

His best finish at the Ski-flying World Championships was seventh in the team event (2004, 2006) while his best individual finish was 39th (2004).

Ipatov's best World Cup finish was fifth in the individual large hill event in Finland in 2007.

His only international victory came in the Winter Universiade in Turin, 2007. He there won the normal hill event.

He is the champion of Russia on the normal hill in Mezhdurechensk, 2005. He has also numerous other medals from Russian championships.
