= Jan Mazoch =

Czech former ski jumper (born 1985)

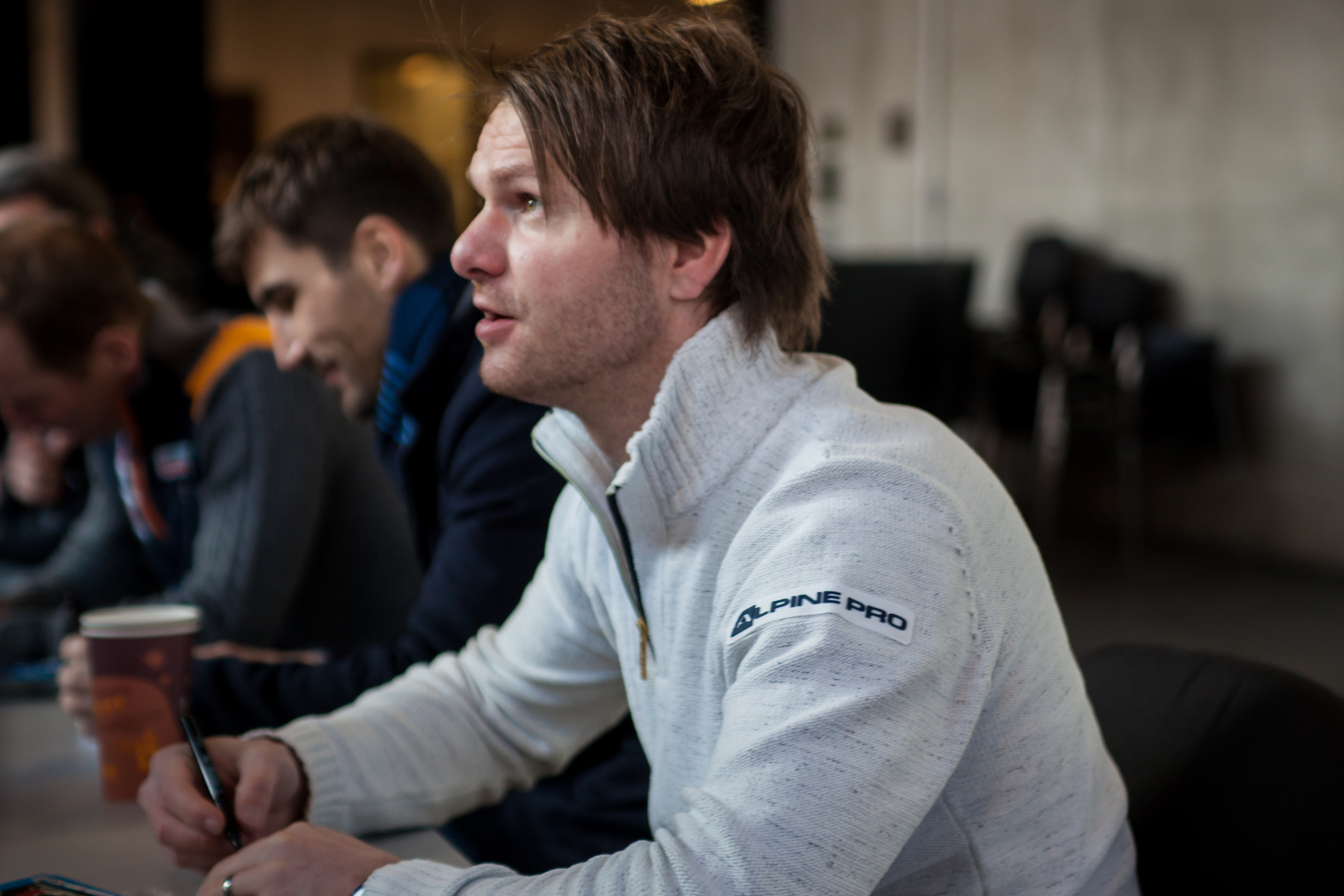

Personal information
- Full name: Jan Mazoch
- Born: 5 September 1985 (age 40) Čeladná, Czechoslovakia

Sport
- Sport: Skiing
- Club: Dukla Frenštát

World Cup career
- Seasons: 2002–2008
- Indiv. podiums: 0
- Indiv. wins: 0

Achievements and titles
- Personal bests: 181.5 m, Vikersund, CoC

Jan Mazoch (born 5 September 1985) is a Czech former ski jumper. He became a regular member of the Czech national team in 2003. Mazoch was a member of the Czech delegation at the 2002 and 2006 Winter Olympics.

He is the grandson of legendary ski-jumper Jiří Raška. He has one daughter, Viktoria, born on 20 June 2007.

== Career ==
Mazoch made his ski competition debut in the World Cup competition held on 13 March 2002 in Falun, Sweden. That same year, he competed in the Junior World Championships, where he placed 9th. He also took part in the Ski Flying World Championships. In his Winter Olympic Games debut at Salt Lake City, he placed 35th. In December 2002, Mazoch finished 3rd in the Czech Republic championship behind Jan Matura and Lukáš Kubáň.

In the 2003 World Championships in Val di Fiemme, Italy, Mazoch was part of the Czech team which finished eighth in the team large hill event. He also took part in the individual normal hill event, finishing 44th.

During the 2004 season, Mazoch took 2nd place at the FIS Continental Cup competition in Rovaniemi, Finland.

In 2005, he competed in the World Championship in Oberstdorf, Germany, where he earned 28th place in the individual competition and a 7th place in the team competition.

In February 2006, he took part in the Normal hill individual event at the Winter Olympics in Torino, Italy. He was one of three Czech ski jumpers to advance from qualifying, jumping 92 metres the day before the final. The following day he jumped 94 metres in the first round and finished in 36th place. He also placed 9th in the team large hill event.

=== Zakopane crash ===
On 20 January 2007, Mazoch competed in a World Cup event in Zakopane, Poland, where he posted a career-best 15th position after his first jump. On his second jump the wind lift suddenly disappeared. As a result, Mazoch lost control just prior to landing and crashed to the ground. Rescue personnel rushed Mazoch to a nearby medical facility where he remained in critical condition. Later that day he was transported to a hospital in Kraków, where he was placed in a medically induced coma to prevent any further injuries. He had sustained serious brain injuries, but no other internal injuries and only some minor skin damage. On 31 January, Mazoch was transported to Prague in the Czech Republic to continue his recovery.

=== Return to the hill and end of career ===
In August 2007, barely 7 months after the Zakopane accident, Mazoch returned to the slopes and made his first jump. In September that year he returned to competition at the Continental Cup event in Villach, Austria, where he finished 7th on the normal hill. The following year he began summer training for the 2008 season. He competed through the 2008 season but was never able to regain the form and confidence he'd known before. As a result, he chose to end his career.
