= Mathias Hafele =

Austrian ski jumper

Personal information
- Nationality: Austria
- Born: 23 December 1983 (age 42) Zams, Austria

Sport
- Sport: Skiing

World Cup career
- Seasons: 2003–2006
- Indiv. podiums: 1

Mathias Hafele (born 23 December 1983) is an Austrian former ski jumper who competed from 2002 to 2007. His best finish at World Cup level was second place in Engelberg on 21 December 2002, which was his only top 10 result. He also finished third overall in the 2005/06 Continental Cup season.
