= Christian Bruder =

German ski jumper

Personal information
- Born: 30 April 1982 (age 44)

Sport
- Sport: Skiing
- Club: WSC 07 Ruhla

World Cup career
- Seasons: 2005
- Indiv. wins: 0
- Updated on 23 December 2007

Christian Bruder (born 30 April 1982) is a retired German ski jumper.

In the World Cup he finished once among the top 15, his best result being a fourteenth place from Sapporo in February 2005.

He also participated in Nordic combined, but not in World Cup events in this particular sport.
