= Maksim Anisimov =

Belarusian ski jumper (born 1983)

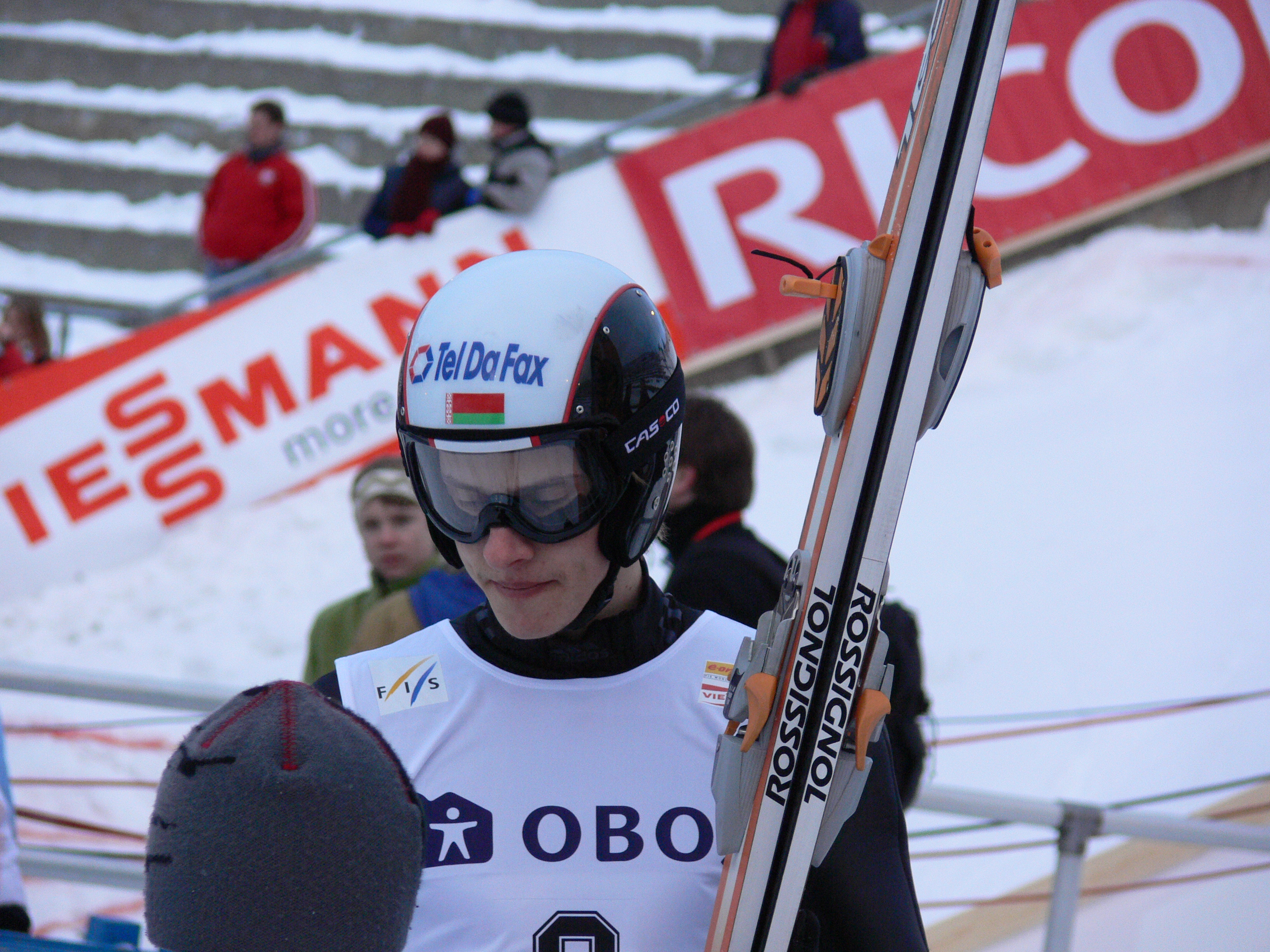
Maxim Anisimov at the 2006 World Cup Ski Jumping event in Holmenkollen

Maksim Viktaravich Anisimov (Belarusian: Максім Анісімаў; Russian: Максим Анисимов; born April 5, 1983, in Minsk) is a Belarusian ski jumper who has been competing since 2003. He finished 33rd in the individual normal hill at the 2006 Winter Olympics in Turin.

At the 2005 FIS Nordic World Ski Championships in Oberstdorf, Anisimov finished 13th in the team normal hill and 50th in the individual normal hill events. He finished tenth in the team and 42nd in the individual events at the 2004 Ski-flying World Championships in Planica.

Anisimov's best World Cup finish was 28th in a large hill event in Germany in 2004. His only career victory was in a Continental Cup normal hill event in Finland in 2005.

He also competed in Nordic combined in 2002 and 2003, leading to him earning his best individual finish of 22nd in an FIS race event in Italy in 2003 both in the 7.5 km sprint and 15 km individual competitions.
