= Sigurd Pettersen =

Norwegian former ski jumper

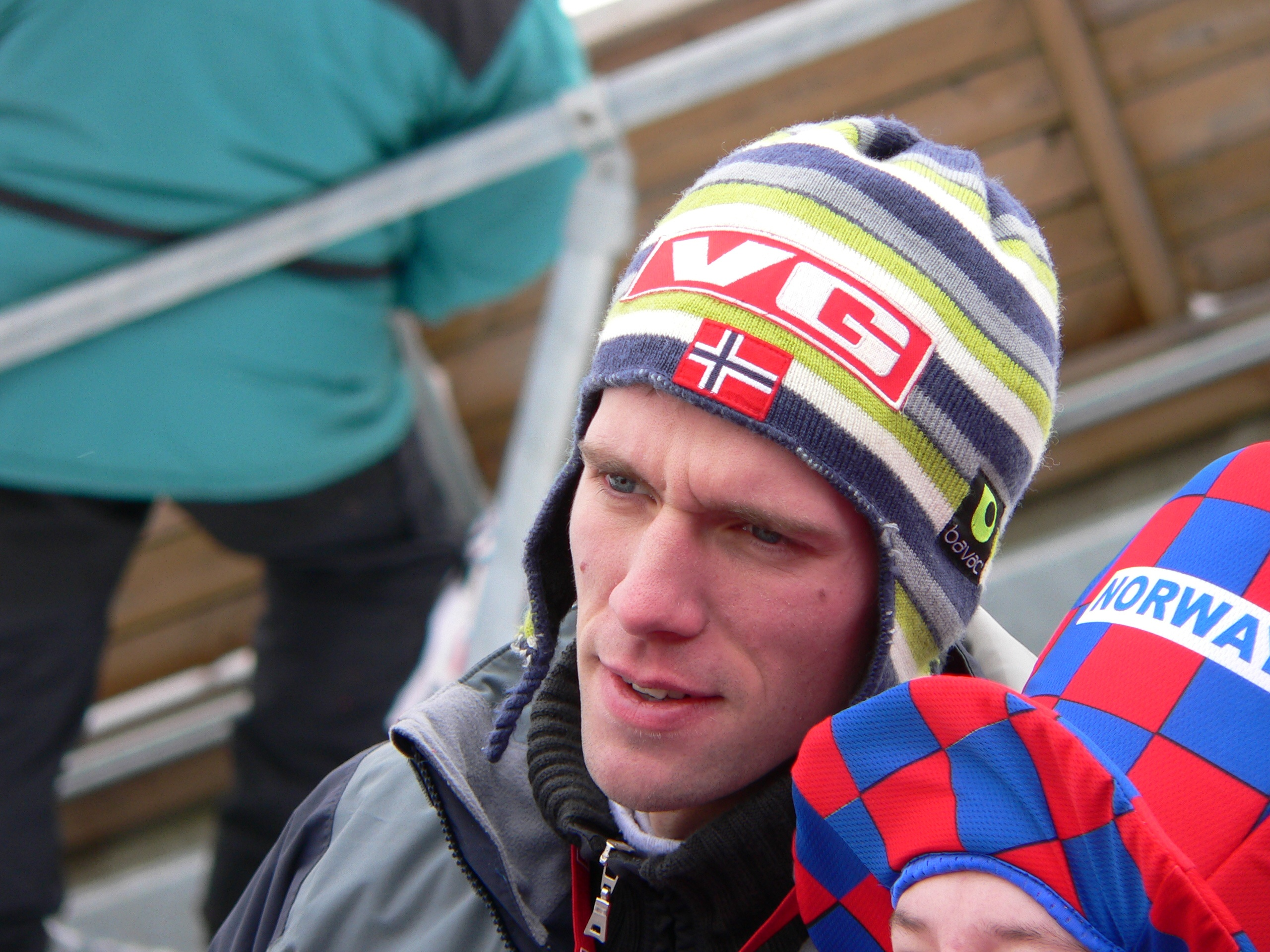

Personal information
- Full name: Sigurd Pettersen
- Born: 28 February 1980 (age 46) Kongsberg, Norway

Sport
- Sport: Skiing
- Club: Rollag og Veggli IL

World Cup career
- Seasons: 2002–09
- Indiv. podiums: 11
- Indiv. wins: 6
- Four Hills titles: 1 (2004)

Achievements and titles
- Personal bests: 227.5 m (746 ft); Planica, 20 Mar 2005
Medal record
Men's ski jumping
World Championships
Bronze medal – third place	2003 Val di Fiemme	Team normal hill
Bronze medal – third place	2005 Oberstdorf	Team large hill
Men's ski flying
World Championships
Gold medal – first place	2004 Planica	Team
- Updated on January 12, 2008

Sigurd Pettersen (born 28 February 1980) is a Norwegian former ski jumper. His greatest achievement is winning the 2003–04 Four Hills Tournament, with wins in Oberstdorf, Garmisch-Partenkirchen and Bischofshofen.

Pettersen also won two bronze medals in the team large hill events at the FIS Nordic World Ski Championships (2003, 2005) and had his best individual finish of 10th in the 2005 event. He won a gold medal in the team event at the FIS Ski-Flying World Championships 2004.

Pettersen's best individual finish at the Winter Olympics was 24th in the individual large hill at Turin in 2006. He also has six individual career victories, all in the large hill, from 2002 to 2004.

Pettersen's own ski club is Rollag og Veggli in Rollag, Norway.

He has his education from the Norwegian School of Sport Sciences.

== Honours ==
- Four Hills Tournament champion: 2003/2004
