= Daniel Forfang =

Norwegian former ski jumper

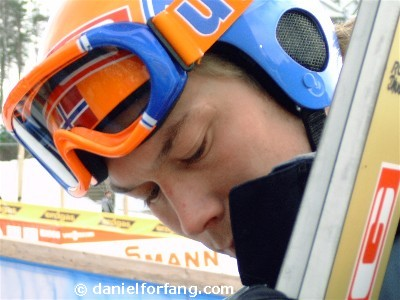

Personal information
- Full name: Daniel Forfang
- Born: 28 December 1979 (age 46) Tromsø, Norway

Sport
- Sport: Skiing
- Club: Tromsø SK

World Cup career
- Seasons: 2001-2006
- Indiv. wins: 0
- Updated on 3 January 2009

Daniel Forfang (born 28 December 1979) is a Norwegian former ski jumper. He had thirty-four World Cup starts, with a fifth place in Kuusamo in 2005 as his best individual result. He also helped win a team competition in Lahti the same year. Forfang retired ahead of the 2006–07 season, feeling that he could not continue the ski jumper's lifestyle, especially pertaining to the pressure of maintaining a low body weight. He is the older brother of current ski jumper Johann André Forfang.

== Early life and career ==
Growing up in Tromsø, during his active career he was managed by his father Hugo. Forfang moved to Trondheim at the age of sixteen, and became affiliated with the regional team Trønderhopp.

Forfang made his international debut in November 2001, with a seventh and eleventh place in two Continental Cup events in Kuusamo. He followed up with a seventh place in Lahti one month later, as well as several good results after New Year, including a third place in Courchevel in January. He had made his WorldCup debut in Predazzo in December, and achieved a fourteenth place in Hakuba and a seventh place in Sapporo in January. The 2002–03 season saw Forfang continue his good Continental Cup run, with a double victory in Zakopane in February. However, he did not make it to the final of any World Cup event, the closest being two 32nd places. He did win a silver medal at the Norwegian normal hill championships, albeit in the absence of Romøren, Pettersen, Ljøkelsøy and Bystøl. In the 2003–04 season he only competed in one World Cup event, and achieved a second place as the best result in the Continental Cup. Citing personal problems as well as economic hardships (there was little money to be made from the sport), he stated that he had contemplated retirement; however, in March 2004 he made progress as he broke the 200-metre barrier in the hill Vikersundbakken. He was the first person from Northern Norway to achieve this feat.

== International breakthrough ==
In September 2004, Forfang announced his plans to establish himself among the world elite. On the same day he finished eighth in a Summer Grand Prix meet in Zakopane, with a new hill record of 139.5 metres. He then won the next two Grand Prix events, and was subsequently promoted to the Norwegian national team. He was also tipped by some as an outsider to win the entire World Cup. In November he secured sponsorship money from twenty companies in his local Troms. He had previously worked odd part-time jobs parallel to training. Forfang also signed a deal with ski provider Rossignol.

In late 2004, then, Forfang established himself in the World Cup. He finished seventeenth in the season opener in Kuusamo in November, following a fall in the second round. Weeks later he was hospitalized following another fall. However, he followed up with participation in the Four Hills Tournament around New Year, reaching the final round in Oberstdorf and Bischofshofen. He then reached the top ten for the first time in a World Cup race, with a tenth place in ski flying in Tauplitz. He later improved to a ninth place in Holmenkollen in March, and also helped win a team competition in Lahti.

== Decline and retirement ==
Forfang did not compete much in the 2005–06 season. Completely absent from the Continental Cup circuit, he competed in seven World Cup races between November and January. His season, and career, best result was the fifth place in Kuusamo in the season opener. His last result was a 30th place in Sapporo. The 2006 Winter Olympics were staged in March, but Forfang was not included in the Norwegian squad. In the summer of 2006 his place on the national team was not renewed. He had also lost the deal with Rossignol, who backed out of ski jumping altogether.

=== Weight controversy ===
In 2004 the International Ski Federation introduced a rule under which ski jumpers faced sanctions if found to have a body mass index less than a certain level. At that time, director of the Norwegian national team Jan Erik Aalbu described the new rule as "perfect" for Daniel Forfang. A few months later, Norwegian national coach Mika Kojonkoski repeated that the new rule was an advantage to Forfang, seeing as he was relatively large-built compared to other ski jumpers. Standing at 1.84 m (6 ft 0 in) and weighing about 70 kilograms (150 lb), Forfang had been described by the Norwegian newspaper VG as a "muscle man". Kojonkoski later elaborated that Forfang's success "reinstated the ski jumping world's faith" in that "larger" sportspeople have a future in the sport.

In August 2006, Forfang decided to retire. It surfaced that Forfang had struggled with weight issues over a longer period, and that the request for physiological and psychological help from Olympiatoppen in January the same year had been fruitless. Forfang ultimately grew jaded of focusing on nutrition "80%" of the time. He claimed that the ski jumper's diet consisted of "half an apple for breakfast, a light salad for lunch, chicken salad for dinner and one crisp bread for supper—in addition to litres upon litres of water and coffee".

Forfang later became a ski jumping coach in Trønderhopp.
