= Wielka Krokiew =

Ski jumping hill in Zakopane, Poland

Coordinates: 49°16′46″N 19°57′55″E

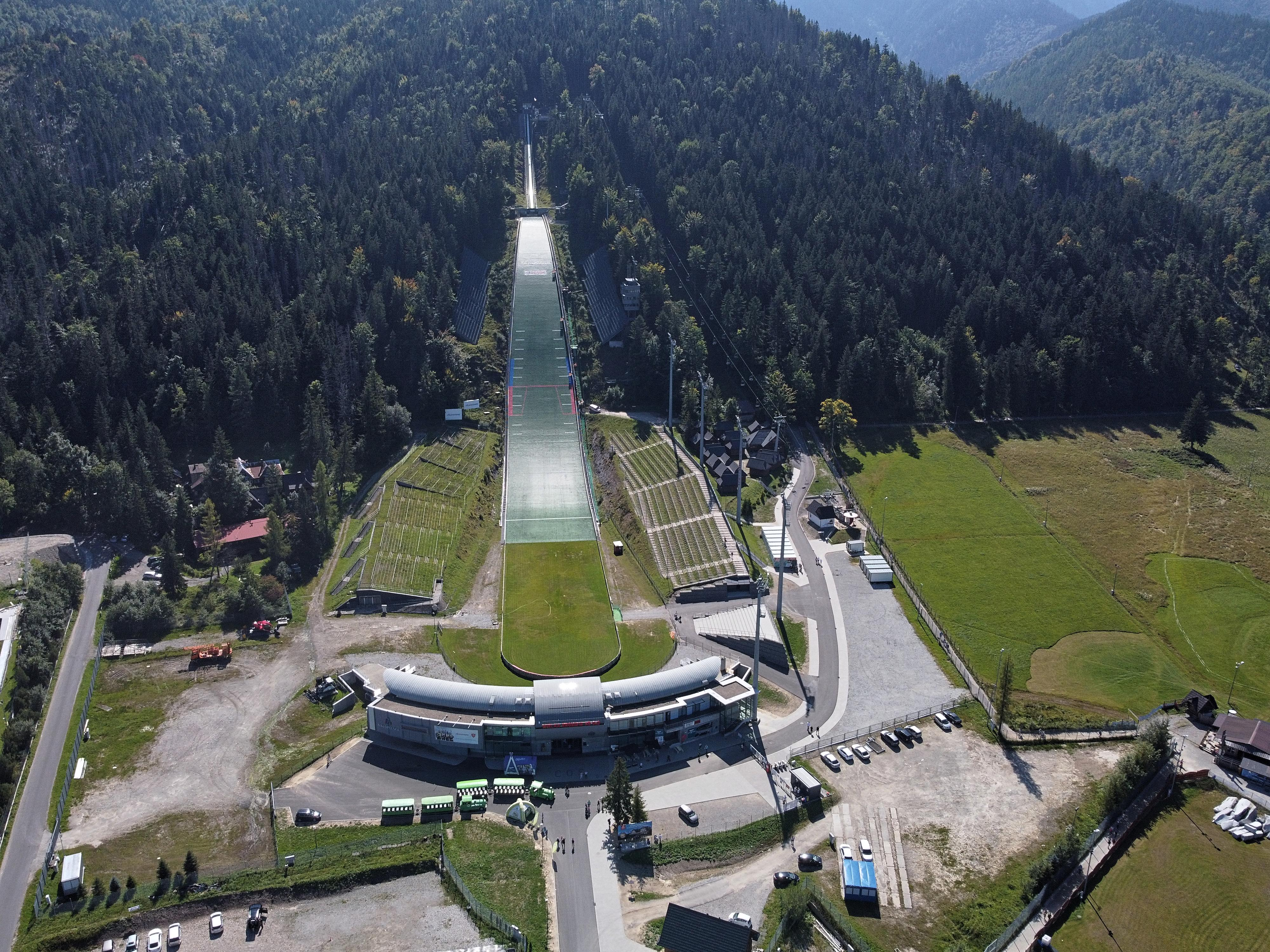
- Location: Zakopane; Poland
- Opened: 1925

Size
- K–point: K-125
- Hill size: HS 140
- Longest jump (unofficial / fall): (Slovenia) Domen Prevc (150.5 m in 2025)
- Hill record: (Norway) Benjamin Østvold (150 m in 2021)

Top events
- World Championships: 1929 FIS Nordic World Ski Championships; 1939 FIS Nordic World Ski Championships; 1962 FIS Nordic World Ski Championships

Wielka Krokiew (The Great Krokiew) is the biggest ski jumping hill built on the slope of Krokiew mountain (1378 m) in Zakopane, Poland. It was opened in 1925. Since 1989 the hills bears the official name Wielka Krokiew im. Stanisława Marusarza. It is a regular venue in the FIS Ski jumping World Cup. The capacity of the ski jumping stadium is 40,001.

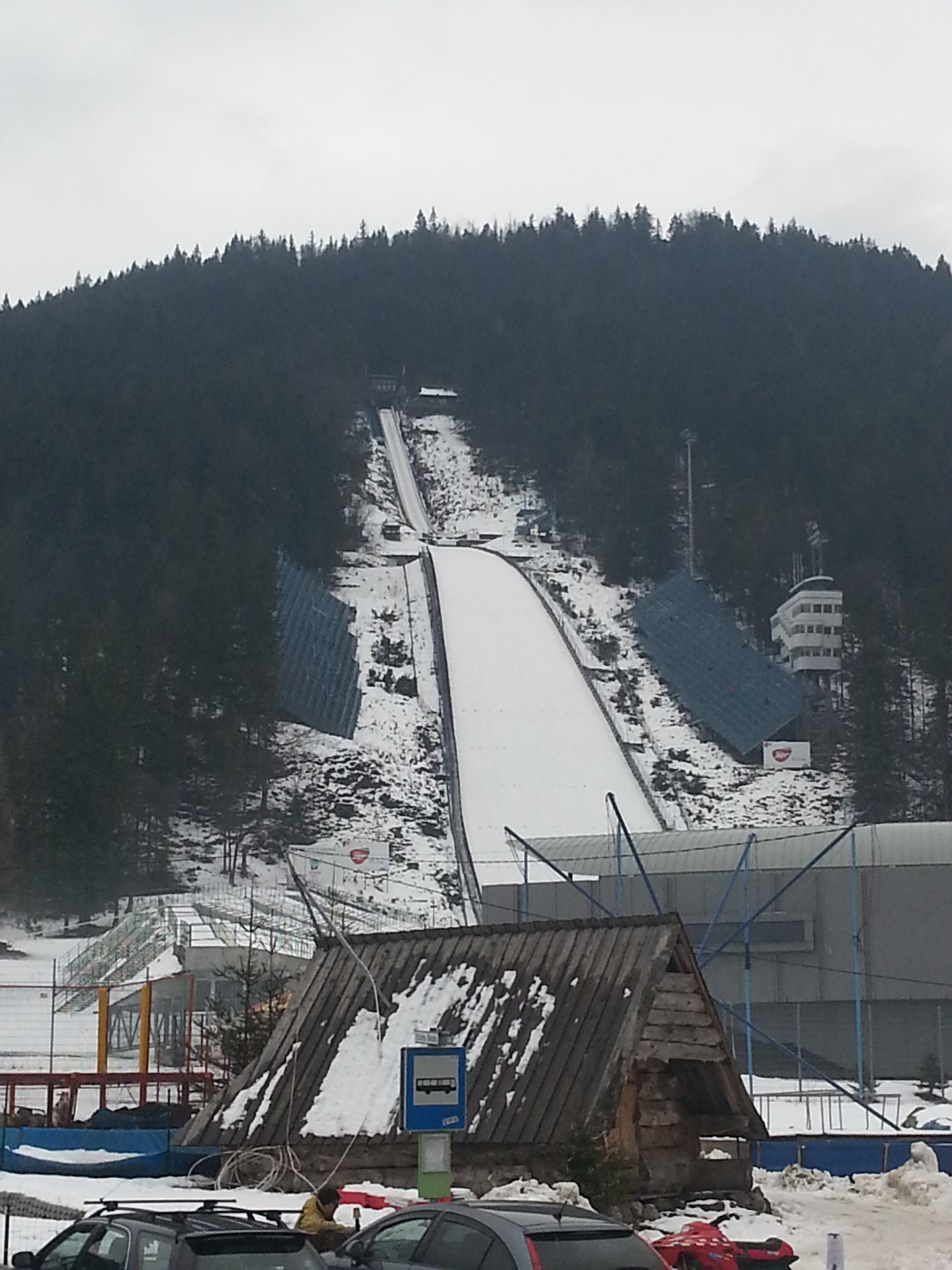
Wielka Krokiew in 2014

The hill was featured in competitions at the 1929, 1939, and 1962 FIS Nordic World Ski Championships, as well as the 2001 Winter Universiade.

In 1997, Pope John Paul II, while visiting his native country, celebrated a mass at the hill's stadium.

Since 2001, due to the success of Polish jumper Adam Małysz, Wielka Krokiew has seen some of the largest audiences in World Cup ski jumping history.

During the 2020 Ski Jumping World Cup – Teams, Japanese ski jumper Yukiya Satō (佐藤 幸椰) broke Dawid Kubacki's previous hill record at 143.5m with a massive 147m jump. It was also 4m meters better than the next best jump, at 143m which belonged to Ryōyū Kobayashi (小林 陵侑) from Japan.
