= ORLEN Arena Oberstdorf =

Ski jumping hill in Oberstdorf, Germany

Schattenbergschanze
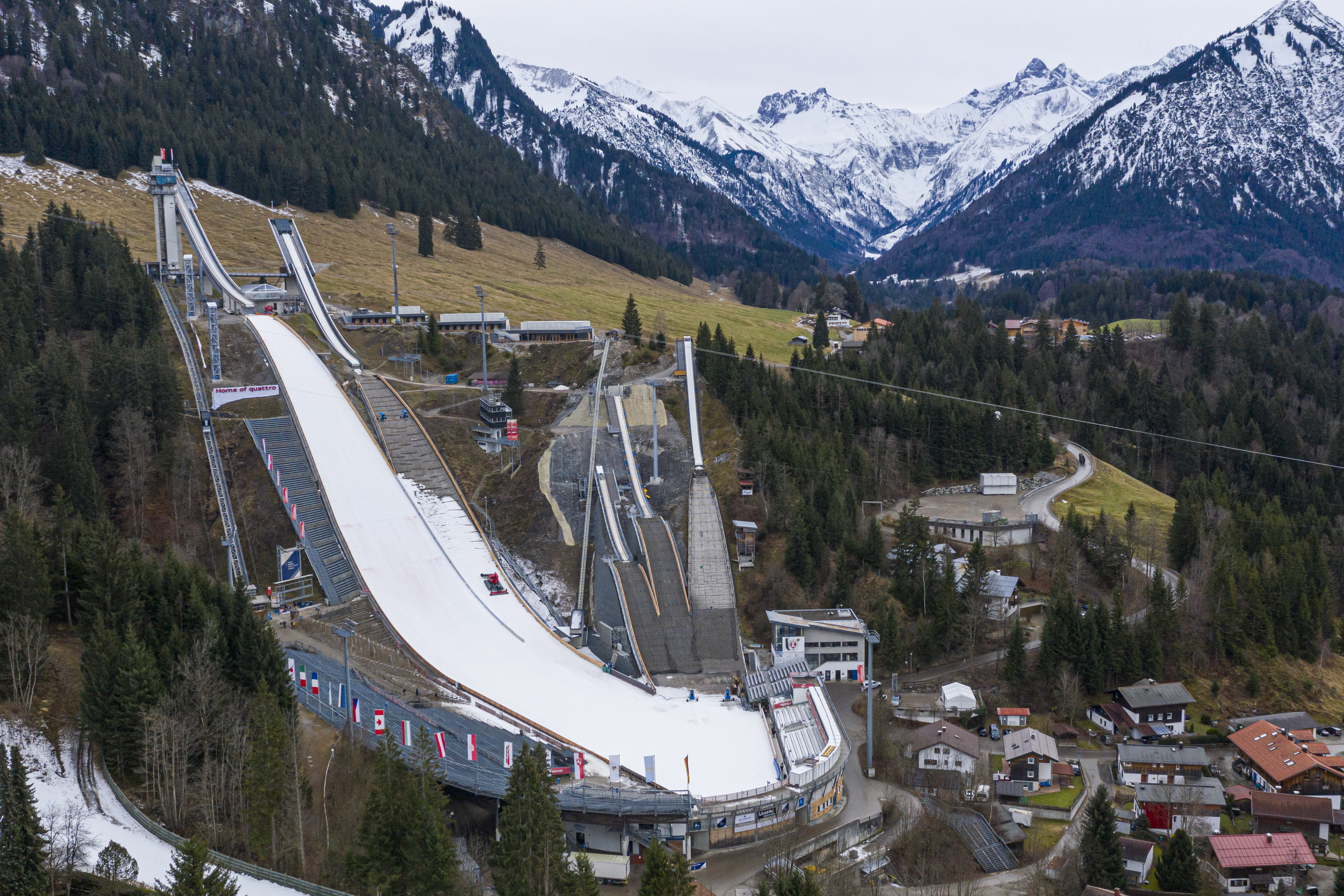
- Location: Oberstdorf, Bavaria; Germany
- Coordinates: 47°24′20″N 10°17′34″E
- Opened: 1925
- Renovated: 2003

Size
- K–point: K-120, K-95, K-56, K-30, K-19
- Hill size: HS137, HS106, HS60, HS30, HS20
- Hill record: 143.5 m (470.8 ft) (Norway) Sigurd Pettersen (29 December 2003)

Top events
- World Championships: 1987, 2005, 2021

The Schattenberg Ski Jump, known for sponsorship purposes as ORLEN Arena Oberstdorf (from 2017 to 2023 Audi Arena Oberstdorf, from 2004 to 2017 Erdinger Arena, and in German, until 2004, as Skisprungstadion am Schattenberg) is a complex of five ski jumping hills, located in the German town of Oberstdorf, Bavaria, on the northwestern slope of the Schattenberg mountain (1845 m). The complex's large hill is a K-120, alongside a normal hill K-95, with a K-56, K-30 and K-19 also onsite.

== Hill parameters ==
- Construction point: 120 m
- Hill size (HS): 137 m
- Official hill record: 143.5 m – (Norway) Sigurd Pettersen (29 December 2003)
- Hill record: 144.5 m – (Austria) Franz-Josef Rehrl (3 February 2023)
- Inrun length: 99.0 m
- Inrun angle: 35.5°
- Take-off length: 6.5 m
- Take-off angle: 11°
- Take-off height: 3.38 m
- Landing angle: 35.5°
- Average speed: 93.2 km/h
