= 2010–11 FIS Ski Flying World Cup =

FIS Ski Flying World Cup 2010/11
Winners
- Overall: (Austria) Gregor Schlierenzauer
- Nations Cup (unofficial): Austria

Competitions
- Venues: 4
- Individual: 7
- Team: 2

The 2010/11 FIS Ski Flying World Cup was the 14th official World Cup season in ski flying awarded with small crystal globe as the subdiscipline of FIS Ski Jumping World Cup.

== Map of World Cup hosts ==
(Czech Republic) Harrachov	(Germany) Oberstdorf	(Norway) Vikersund	(Slovenia) Planica
Čerťák	Heini-Klopfer	Vikersundbakken	Letalnica bratov Gorišek
Europe

== Calendar ==
=== Men's Individual ===
All	No.	Date	Place (Hill)	Size	Winner	Second	Third	Ski flying leader	R.
744	1	8 January 2011	(Czech Republic) Harrachov (Čerťák HS205)	F _{079}	(Austria) Martin Koch	(Austria) Thomas Morgenstern	(Poland) Adam Małysz	(Austria) Martin Koch	
745	2	9 January 2011	(Czech Republic) Harrachov (Čerťák HS205)	F _{080}	(Austria) Thomas Morgenstern	(Switzerland) Simon Ammann	(Czech Republic) Roman Koudelka	(Austria) T. Morgenstern	
753	3	5 February 2011	(Germany) Oberstdorf (Heini-Klopfer HS213)	F _{081}	(Austria) Martin Koch	(Norway) Tom Hilde	(Austria) Gregor Schlierenzauer	(Austria) Martin Koch	
754	4	12 February 2011	(Norway) Vikersund (Vikersundbakken HS225)	F _{082}	(Austria) Gregor Schlierenzauer (Norway) Johan Remen Evensen		(Switzerland) Simon Ammann	(Austria) Martin Koch	
755	5	13 February 2011	(Norway) Vikersund (Vikersundbakken HS225)	F _{083}	(Austria) Gregor Schlierenzauer	(Norway) Johan Remen Evensen	(Poland) Adam Małysz	(Austria) G. Schlierenzauer	
757	6	18 March 2011	(Slovenia) Planica (Letalnica b. Gorišek HS215)	F _{084}	(Austria) Gregor Schlierenzauer	(Austria) Thomas Morgenstern	(Austria) Martin Koch	(Austria) G. Schlierenzauer	
758	7	(Note: One round competition due to bad weather.)20 March 2011	(Slovenia) Planica (Letalnica b. Gorišek HS215)	F _{085}	(Poland) Kamil Stoch	(Slovenia) Robert Kranjec	(Poland) Adam Małysz	(Austria) G. Schlierenzauer	
14th FIS Ski Flying Men's Overall (8 January – 20 March 2011)					(Austria) Gregor Schlierenzauer	(Austria) Martin Koch	(Austria) Thomas Morgenstern	Ski Flying Overall	

=== Men's team ===
All	No.	Date	Place (Hill)	Size	Winner	Second	Third	R.
52	1	6 February 2011	(Germany) Oberstdorf (Heini-Klopfer-Skiflugschanze HS213)	F _{010}	Austria Thomas Morgenstern; Andreas Kofler; Gregor Schlierenzauer; Martin Koch	Norway Johan Remen Evensen; Anders Jacobsen; Bjørn Einar Romøren; Tom Hilde	Germany Michael Neumayer; Richard Freitag; Michael Uhrmann; Severin Freund	
54	2	19 March 2011	(Slovenia) Planica (Letalnica bratov Gorišek HS215)	F _{011}	Austria Gregor Schlierenzauer; Martin Koch; Andreas Kofler; Thomas Morgenstern	Norway Anders Bardal; Johan Remen Evensen; Bjørn Einar Romøren; Tom Hilde	Slovenia Peter Prevc; Jernej Damjan; Jurij Tepeš; Robert Kranjec	

FIS Team Tour 2011 (part of)

== Standings ==
=== Ski Flying ===
Rank	after 7 events	08/01/2011 Harrachov	09/01/2011 Harrachov	05/02/2011 Oberstdorf	12/02/2011 Vikersund	13/02/2011 Vikersund	18/03/2011 Planica	20/03/2011 Planica	Total
	(Austria) Gregor Schlierenzauer	45	20	60	100	100	100	50	475
2	(Austria) Martin Koch	100	29	100	36	36	60	26	387
3	(Austria) Thomas Morgenstern	80	100	15	22	45	80	36	378
4	(Poland) Adam Małysz	60	50	40	45	60	32	60	347
5	(Switzerland) Simon Ammann	40	80	26	60	50	40	15	311
6	(Norway) Johan Remen Evensen	20	15	18	100	80	29	29	291
7	(Norway) Tom Hilde	36	36	80	50	32	18	11	263
8	(Slovenia) Robert Kranjec	50	40	16	29	12	15	80	242
9	(Poland) Kamil Stoch	15	18	24	24	24	36	100	241
10	(Finland) Matti Hautamäki	8	2	29	26	29	50	2	146
11	(Czech Republic) Roman Koudelka	26	60	20	8	0	7	12	133
12	(Austria) Wolfgang Loitzl	22	45	8	—	—	13	32	120
13	(Japan) Daiki Itō	—	—	45	32	0	20	16	113
14	(Norway) Bjørn Einar Romøren	32	32	—	—	—	26	22	112
15	(Germany) Severin Freund	—	—	50	—	—	14	40	104
16	(Norway) Anders Jacobsen	—	—	22	40	22	16	3	103
17	(Norway) Anders Bardal	7	0	0	—	—	45	45	97
18	(Norway) Ole Marius Ingvaldsen	14	22	—	16	26	0	9	87
19	(Germany) Michael Neumayer	18	24	9	18	0	4	6	79
20	(Slovenia) Jurij Tepeš	16	14	0	0	7	22	10	69
21	(Austria) Andreas Kofler	—	—	36	—	—	24	8	68
22	(Finland) Janne Happonen	—	—	11	13	40	—	—	64
23	(Czech Republic) Jan Matura	24	11	0	0	0	8	20	63
	(France) Emmanuel Chedal	—	—	10	20	9	—	24	63
25	(Finland) Olli Muotka	13	16	0	12	18	2	—	61
26	(Austria) Stefan Thurnbichler	32	7	—	9	—	11	—	59
27	(Czech Republic) Borek Sedlák	12	26	—	2	0	—	—	40
	(Italy) Andrea Morassi	4	10	0	10	16	0	—	40
29	(Czech Republic) Jakub Janda	9	0	0	11	14	3	—	37
30	(Germany) Michael Uhrmann	—	—	32	—	—	—	—	32
31	(Norway) Rune Velta	—	—	—	15	15	—	—	30
	(Japan) Noriaki Kasai	—	—	13	6	11	—	—	30
33	(Japan) Shōhei Tochimoto	—	—	2	14	13	—	—	29
34	(Russia) Denis Kornilov	2	5	—	0	20	—	1	28
	(Poland) Stefan Hula	10	13	—	—	—	1	4	28
36	(Slovenia) Peter Prevc	—	—	—	—	—	10	14	24
37	(Austria) Manuel Fettner	—	—	3	—	—	0	18	21
38	(Russia) Pavel Karelin	—	—	6	—	—	0	13	19
	(Slovenia) Jernej Damjan	—	—	0	0	0	12	7	19
	(Poland) Piotr Żyła	—	—	4	0	10	5	—	19
41	(Czech Republic) Lukáš Hlava	0	4	5	4	5	–	–	18
42	(Norway) Andreas Stjernen	—	—	—	7	8	—	—	15
43	(Finland) Kalle Keituri	—	—	14	—	—	0	—	14
	(Japan) Fumihisa Yumoto	—	—	13	0	1	—	—	13
45	(Germany) Martin Schmitt	1	12	—	—	—	—	—	13
	(Germany) Felix Schoft	11	0	—	—	2	—	—	13
	(Germany) Maximilian Mechler	0	9	—	0	4	0	—	13
	(Slovenia) Tomaž Naglič	5	8	—	0	0	—	—	13
49	(Italy) Sebastian Colloredo	0	0	0	—	—	9	—	9
	(Japan) Taku Takeuchi	—	—	0	3	6	—	—	9
	(Norway) Vegard Haukø Sklett	0	6	—	0	3	—	—	9
52	(Germany) Richard Freitag	—	—	7	—	—	—	—	7
53	(Slovenia) Dejan Judež	—	—	—	—	—	6	—	6
	(Japan) Kazuya Yoshioka	6	0	—	—	—	—	—	6
55	(Italy) Davide Bresadola	—	—	—	5	0	—	—	5
	(Finland) Anssi Koivuranta	—	—	—	—	—	0	5	5
57	(Austria) Mario Innauer	0	3	—	—	—	—	—	3
	(Russia) Ilya Rosliakov	3	0	—	—	—	—	—	3
59	(Germany) Andreas Wank	—	—	—	1	0	—	—	1
	(Germany) Pascal Bodmer	—	—	1	—	—	—	—	1
	(Sweden) Fredrik Balkåsen	0	1	—	—	—	—	—	1

=== Nations Cup (unofficial) ===
Rank	after 9 events	Points
1	Austria	2411
2	Norway	1707
3	Poland	885
4	Slovenia	773
5	Finland	640
6	Germany	763
7	Czech Republic	491
8	Japan	400
9	Switzerland	311
10	France	113
11	Italy	54
12	Russia	50
13	Sweden	1
