= 2010–11 Four Hills Tournament =

Ski jumping competition

Four Hills Tournament at the 2010–11 FIS Ski Jumping World Cup
- Venue: Schattenbergschanze, Große Olympiaschanze, Bergiselschanze, Paul-Ausserleitner-Schanze
- Location: Austria, Germany
- Dates: 29 December 2010 – 6 January 2011

Medalists
gold medal	(Austria) Thomas Morgenstern
silver medal	(Switzerland) Simon Ammann
bronze medal	(Norway) Tom Hilde

The 2010–11 Four Hills Tournament took place at the four traditional venues of Oberstdorf, Garmisch-Partenkirchen, Innsbruck, and Bischofshofen, located in Germany and Austria, between 29 December 2010 and 6 January 2011.

== Results ==
=== Oberstdorf ===
HS 137 Schattenbergschanze, Germany
29 December 2010

Rank	Name	Nationality	Jump 1 (m)	Jump 2 (m)	Points
1	Thomas Morgenstern	Austria	131.5	138.0	289.6
2	Matti Hautamäki	Finland	125.0	137.5	273.1
3	Manuel Fettner	Austria	130.0	131.5	264.0
4	Simon Ammann	Switzerland	123.0	134.5	259.6
5	Andreas Kofler	Austria	128.5	126.0	259.0
6	Severin Freund	Germany	127.0	130.5	258.7
7	Martin Koch	Austria	124.0	132.5	254.1
8	Michael Neumayer	Germany	127.0	128.5	254.0
9	Wolfgang Loitzl	Austria	127.5	124.5	248.8
10	Tom Hilde	Norway	120.5	128.0	246.6

=== Garmisch-Partenkirchen ===
HS 137 Große Olympiaschanze, Germany
1 January 2012

Rank	Name	Nationality	Jump 1 (m)	Jump 2 (m)	Points
1	Simon Ammann	Switzerland	131.0	Cancelled (wind)	142.1
2	Pavel Karelin	Russia	132.5	Cancelled (wind)	138.3
3	Adam Małysz	Poland	132.0	Cancelled (wind)	138.0
4	Anders Jacobsen	Norway	127.5	Cancelled (wind)	134.7
5	Janne Ahonen	Finland	134.0	Cancelled (wind)	133.2
6	Anssi Koivuranta	Finland	134.0	Cancelled (wind)	133.0
7	Martin Schmitt	Germany	134.5	Cancelled (wind)	131.9
8	Kamil Stoch	Poland	131.5	Cancelled (wind)	127.3
9	Bjørn Einar Romøren	Norway	129.5	Cancelled (wind)	127.0
10	Martin Koch	Austria	123.0	Cancelled (wind)	126.1

=== Innsbruck ===
HS 130 Bergiselschanze, Austria
3 January 2012

Rank	Name	Nationality	Jump 1 (m)	Jump 2 (m)	Points
1	Thomas Morgenstern	Austria	129.5	126.5	266.5
2	Adam Małysz	Poland	128.0	123.0	257.5
3	Tom Hilde	Norway	127.5	122.0	255.2
4	Simon Ammann	Switzerland	128.0	122.0	252.7
5	Matti Hautamäki	Finland	125.0	123.5	249.7
6	Manuel Fettner	Austria	126.0	120.0	248.0
7	Andreas Kofler	Austria	125.0	119.5	243.6
8	Michael Uhrmann	Germany	121.5	126.5	242.4
9	Wolfgang Loitzl	Austria	123.0	121.5	241.8
10	Pascal Bodmer	Germany	122.5	120.0	241.0

=== Bischofshofen ===
HS 140 Paul-Ausserleitner-Schanze, Austria
6 January 2012

Rank	Name	Nationality	Jump 1 (m)	Jump 2 (m)	Points
1	Tom Hilde	Norway	138.0	132.0	278.7
2	Thomas Morgenstern	Austria	136.0	135.0	277.1
3	Andreas Kofler	Austria	131.5	139.5	275.3
4	Simon Ammann	Switzerland	133.0	140.0	274.0
5	Martin Koch	Austria	131.5	140.5	264.5
6	Manuel Fettner	Austria	127.5	135.0	259.3
7	Johan Remen Evensen	Norway	132.5	132.0	256.6
8	Michael Neumayer	Germany	128.5	127.0	243.8
9	Anders Jacobsen	Norway	126.5	127.0	238.4
10	Pascal Bodmer	Germany	124.5	127.5	236.4
10	Adam Małysz	Poland	124.5	126.5	236.4

== Overall standings ==
The final standings after all four events:

Rank	Name	Nationality	Oberstdorf	Garmisch- Partenkirchen	Innsbruck	Bischofshofen	Total Points
1st place, gold medalist(s)	Thomas Morgenstern	Austria	289.6 (1)	125.6 (14)	266.5 (1)	277.1 (2)	958.8
2nd place, silver medalist(s)	Simon Ammann	Switzerland	259.6 (4)	142.1 (1)	252.7 (4)	274.0 (4)	928.4
3rd place, bronze medalist(s)	Tom Hilde	Norway	246.6 (10)	114.5 (36)	255.2 (3)	278.7 (1)	895.0
4	Manuel Fettner	Austria	264.0 (3)	111.1 (29)	248.0 (6)	259.3 (6)	882.4
5	Martin Koch	Austria	254.1 (7)	126.1 (10)	235.9 (13)	264.5 (5)	880.6
6	Adam Małysz	Poland	243.3 (11)	138.0 (3)	257.5 (2)	236.4 (10)	875.2
7	Matti Hautamäki	Finland	273.1 (2)	115.6 (34)	249.7 (5)	223.4 (22)	861.8
8	Andreas Kofler	Austria	259.0 (5)	62.6 (50)	243.6 (7)	275.3 (3)	840.5
9	Wolfgang Loitzl	Austria	248.8 (9)	120.2 (24)	241.8 (9)	223.7 (19)	834.5
10	Anders Jacobsen	Norway	223.3 (23)	134.7 (4)	234.3 (15)	238.4 (9)	830.7
