= FIS Team Tour 2011 =

The FIS Team Tour 2011 was a team competition that took place in Willingen, Klingenthal and Oberstdorf located in Germany, between 29 January and 6 February 2011.

== Results ==
| Date | Place | Hill | Size | Winner | Second | Third | Ref. |
|---|---|---|---|---|---|---|---|
| 29 Jan 2011 | (Germany) Willingen | Mühlenkopfschanze HS 145 | LH | Austria; Thomas Morgenstern; Martin Koch; Andreas Kofler; Gregor Schlierenzauer | Germany; Severin Freund; Michael Neumayer; Martin Schmitt; Michael Uhrmann | Poland; Adam Małysz; Kamil Stoch; Stefan Hula; Piotr Żyła | |
| 30 Jan 2011 | (Germany) Willingen | Mühlenkopfschanze HS 145 | LH | (Germany) Severin Freund | (Austria) Martin Koch | (Switzerland) Simon Ammann | |
| 2 Feb 2011 | (Germany) Klingenthal | Vogtland Arena HS 140 | LH | (Poland) Kamil Stoch | (Austria) Thomas Morgenstern | (Switzerland) Simon Ammann | |
| 5 Feb 2011 | (Germany) Oberstdorf | Heini-Klopfer-Skiflug. HS 213 (night) | FH | (Austria) Martin Koch | (Norway) Tom Hilde | (Austria) Gregor Schlierenzauer | |
| 6 Feb 2011 | (Germany) Oberstdorf | Heini-Klopfer-Skiflug. HS 213 (night) | FH | Austria; Thomas Morgenstern; Andreas Kofler; Gregor Schlierenzauer; Martin Koch | Norway; Johan Remen Evensen; Anders Jacobsen; Bjørn Einar Romøren; Tom Hilde | Germany; Michael Neumayer; Richard Freitag; Michael Uhrmann; Severin Freund | |

== Overall ==
| Pos | Ski Jumper | Points |
|---|---|---|
| 1 | Austria | 4564.2 |
| 2 | Norway | 4312.8 |
| 3 | Germany | 4302.6 |
| 4 | Poland | 4219.9 |
| 5 | Finland | 4135.8 |
| 6 | Japan | 3934.2 |
| 7 | Czech Republic | 3823.8 |
| 8 | Slovenia | 3751.8 |
| 9 | Russia | 1731.7 |
| 10 | Italy | 1265.5 |
