= Midtstubakken =

Ski jumping hill in Oslo, Norway

Coordinates: 59°57′52″N 10°40′27″E

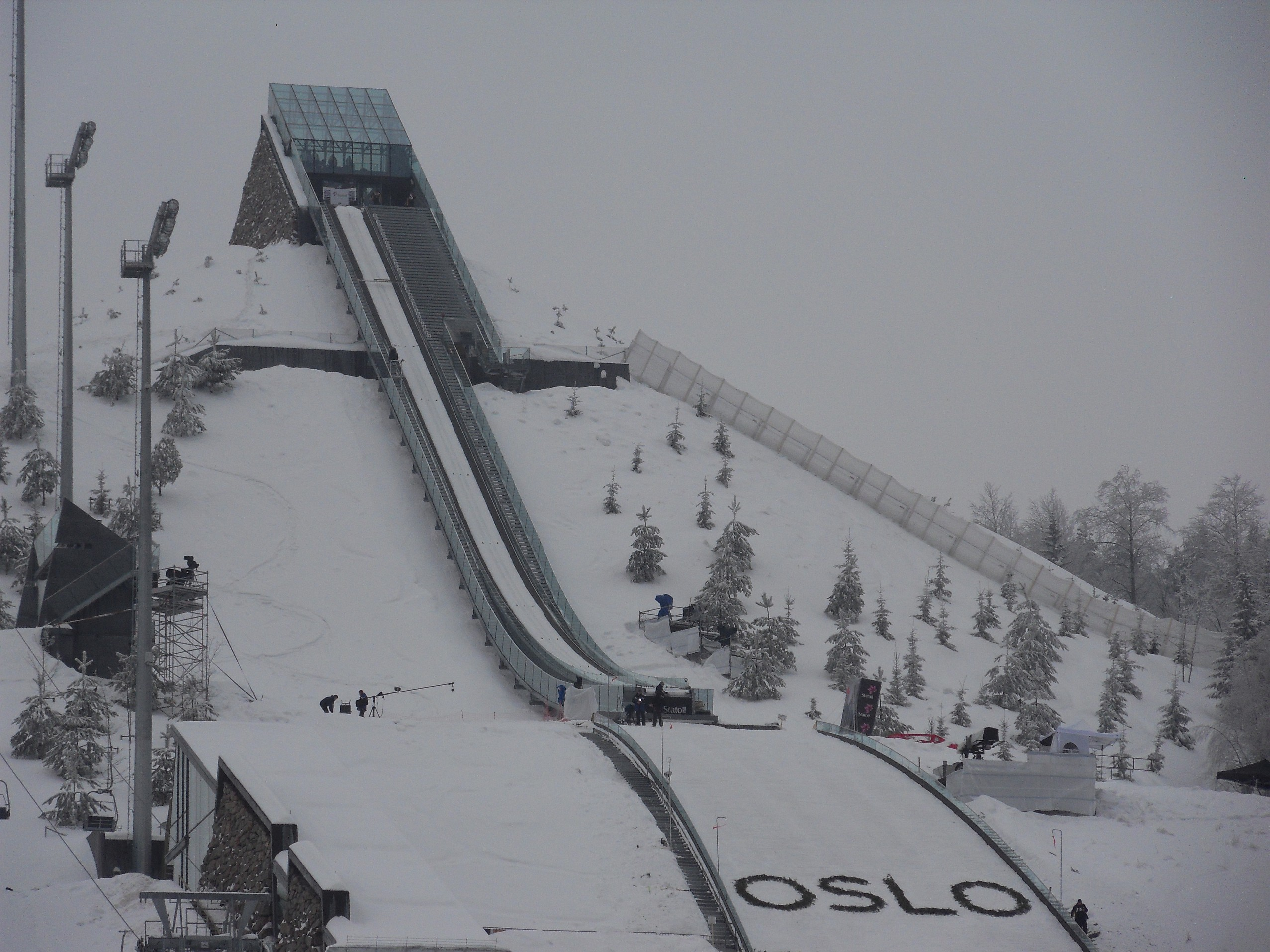
- Location: Holmenkollen, Oslo; Norway
- Operator: Oslo Municipality
- Opened: 2010

Size
- K–point: K-95
- Hill size: HS 106
- Hill record: 110,5 m (363 ft); Maxime Laheurte
- Spectator capacity: 15,000

Top events
- World Championships: 1966, 1982, 2011

Midtstubakken is a ski jumping hill which is part of the Holmenkollen National Arena in Oslo, Norway. It has a hill size of 106 metres, and a K-spot of 95 metres. The current hill dates from 2010, although the first hill at the area was built in 1927. The venue has a capacity for 15,000 spectators and was designed by Grindaker Landskapsarkitekter and Økaw Arkitekter. It is served by Midtstuen Station of the Oslo Metro.

== History ==
The first hill at Midtstubakken was built in 1927, and was renovated several times. The normal hill jumping and Nordic combined for the FIS Nordic World Ski Championships 1966 and FIS Nordic World Ski Championships 1982 were held in Midtstubakken, as will they be for the FIS Nordic World Ski Championships 2011. The superstructure was demolished in 1992, although an all-new hill opened in 2010 for the 2011 World Championships. On 6 September 2010, Maren Lundby made the first jump in the hill, and landed on 87 meters.

== Events ==
=== Ladies ===
Date	Competition	Winner	Second	Third
25 February 2011	NWSC–I	(Austria) Daniela Iraschko	(Italy) Elena Runggaldier	(France) Coline Mattel
9 March 2012	WC	(United States) Sarah Hendrickson	(Japan) Sara Takanashi	(Norway) Anette Sagen

=== Men ===
Date	Competition	Winner	Second	Third
19 February 1966	NWSC	(Norway) Bjørn Wirkola	(East Germany) Dieter Neuendorf	(Finland) Paavo Lukkariniemi
21 February 1982	NWSC / WC	(Austria) Armin Kogler	(Finland) Jari Puikkonen	(Norway) Ole Bremseth
26 February 2011	NWSC–I	(Austria) Thomas Morgenstern	(Austria) Andreas Kofler	(Poland) Adam Małysz
27 February 2011	NWSC–T	Austria Gregor Schlierenzauer; Martin Koch; Andreas Kofler; Thomas Morgenstern	Norway Anders Jacobsen; Bjørn Einar Romøren; Anders Bardal; Tom Hilde	Germany Martin Schmitt; Michael Neumayer; Michael Uhrmann; Severin Freund

== Photo gallery ==
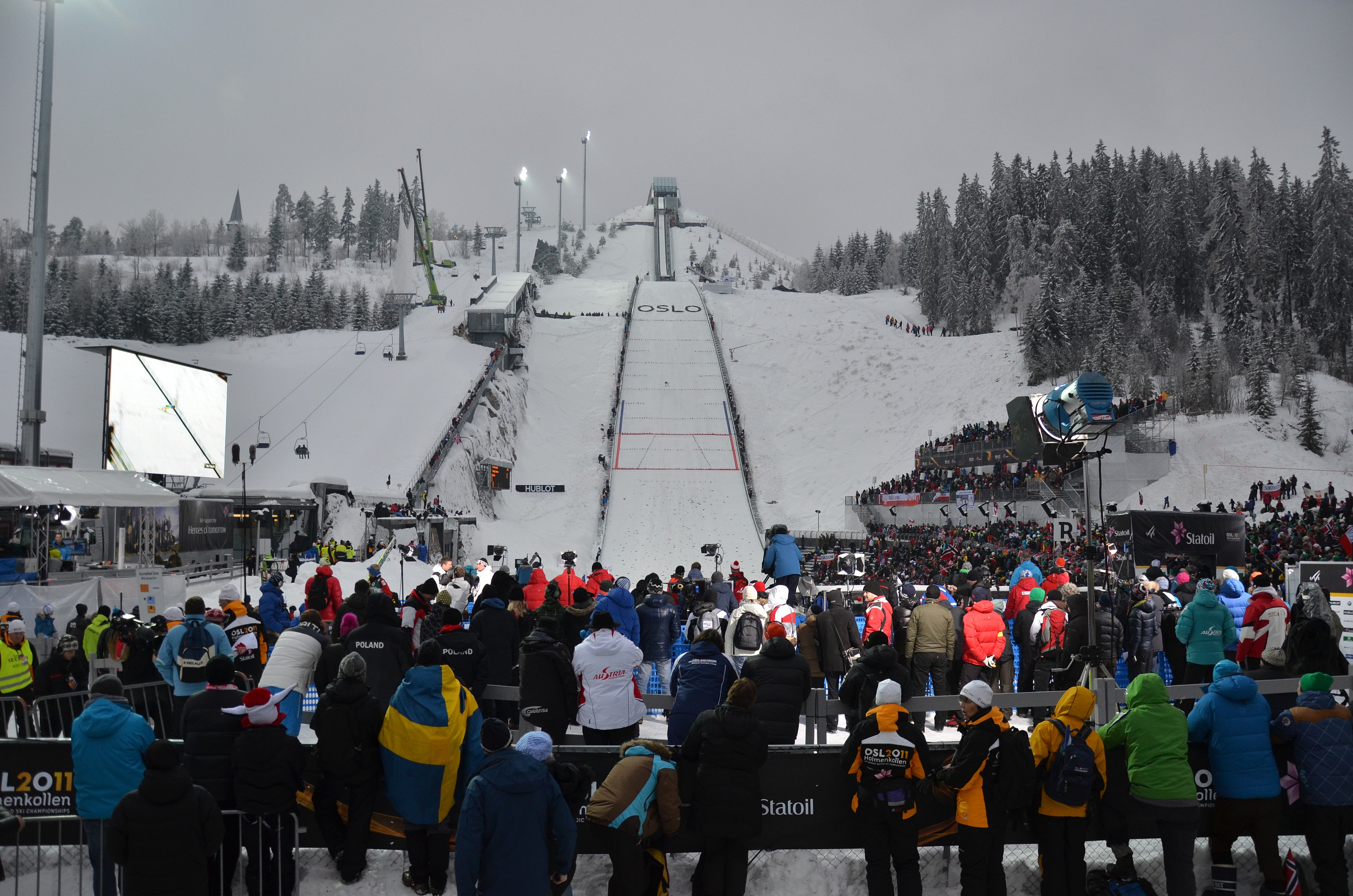
The stadium

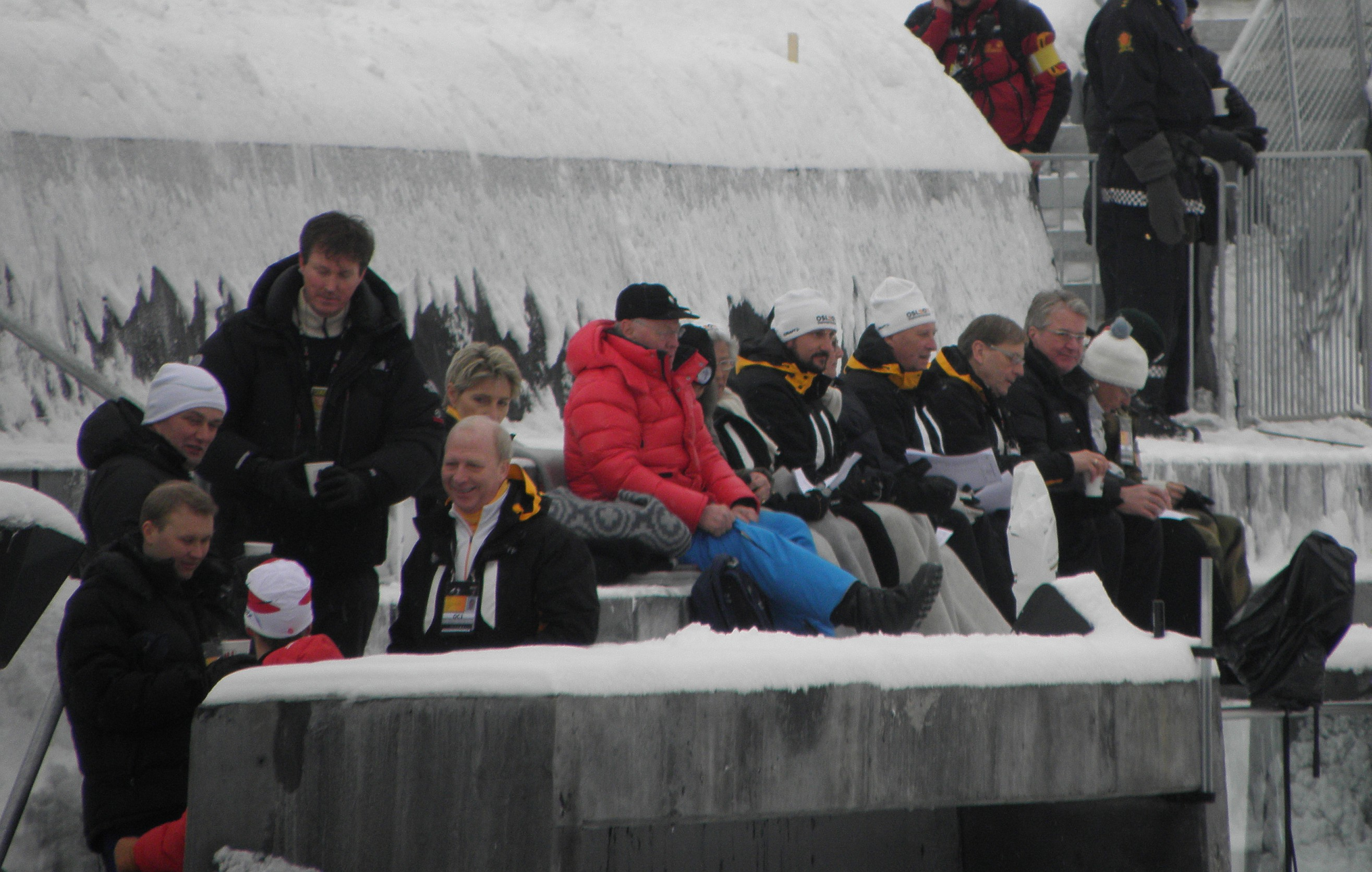
The royal box

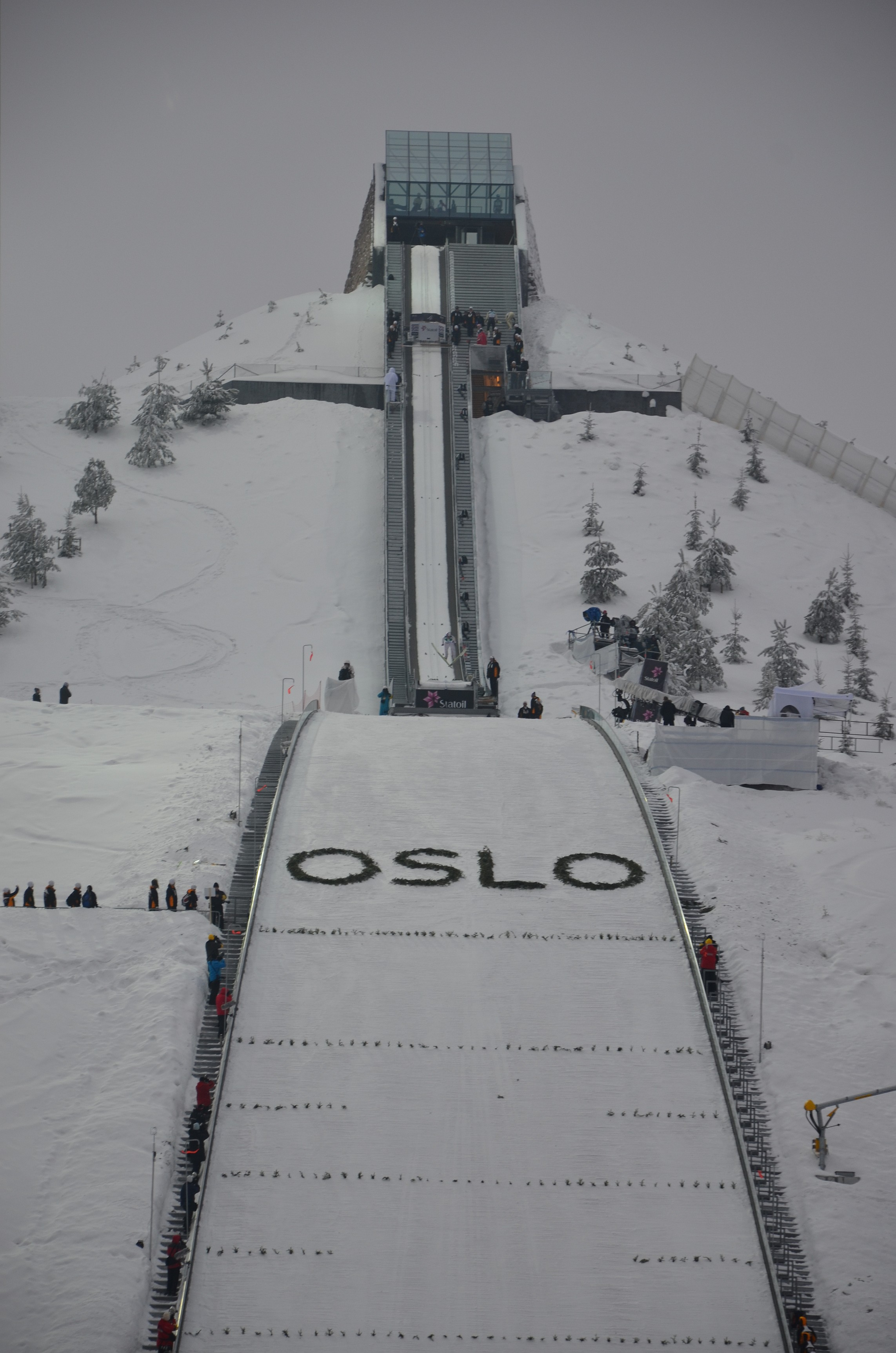
Adam Małysz jumps

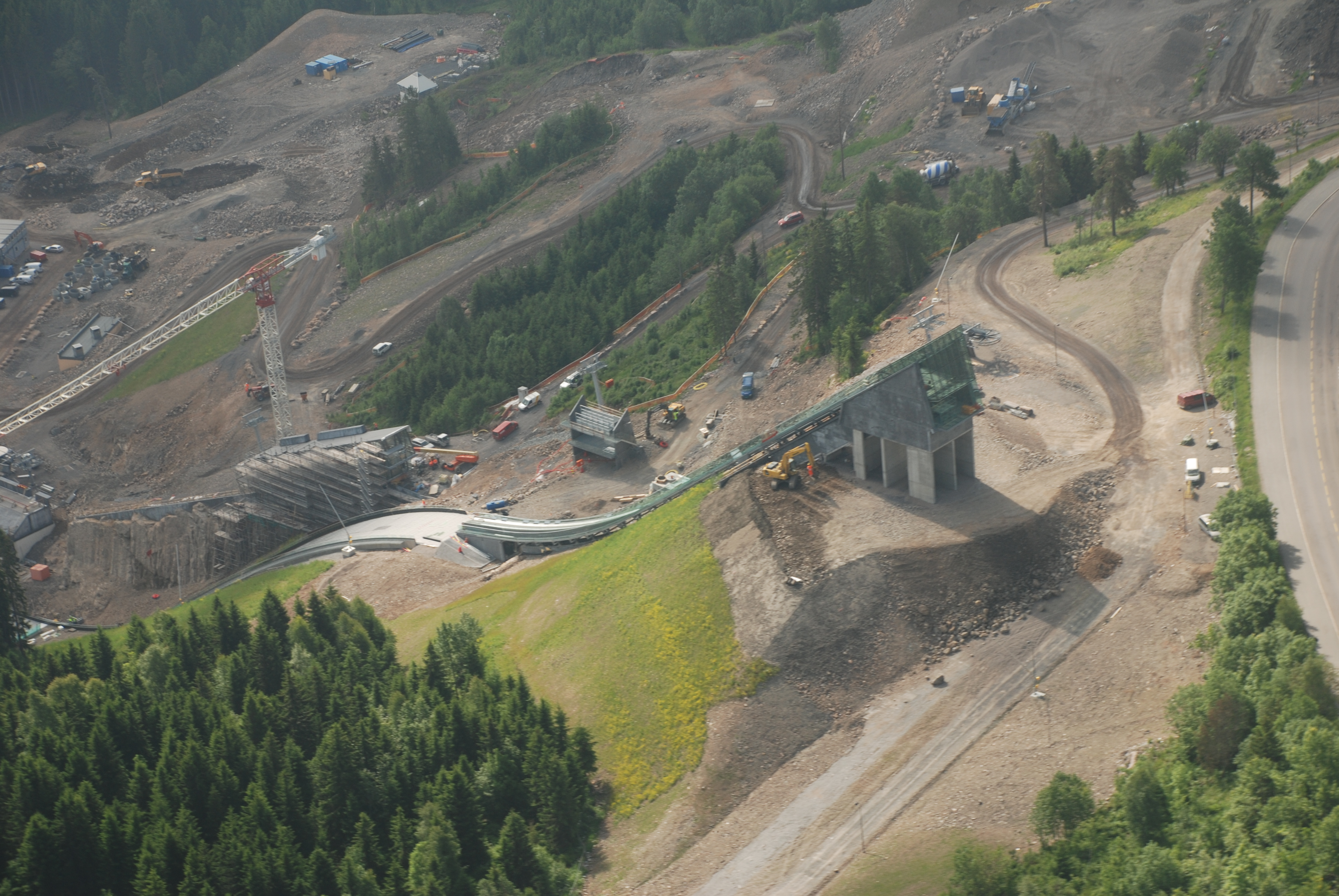
Under construction
