= 2010–11 FIS Ski Jumping World Cup =

Ski jumping championship season

Winners
- Overall: (Austria) Thomas Morgenstern
- Ski flying: (Austria) Gregor Schlierenzauer
- Four Hills Tournament: (Austria) Thomas Morgenstern
- FIS Team Tour: Austria
- Nations Cup: Austria

Competitions
- Venues: 17
- Individual: 26
- Team: 5
- Rescheduled: 2

The 2010–11 FIS Ski Jumping World Cup was the 32nd World Cup season in ski jumping and the 14th official World Cup season in ski flying with fourteenth small crystal globe awarded.

Season began in Kuusamo, Finland on 28 November 2010 and finished at Planica, Slovenia on 20 March 2011. The individual World Cup was overall winner was Thomas Morgenstern (second time in his career) and also won Four Hills Tournament (the only one in his career). Nations Cup was taken by Team of Austria and FIS Team Tour was also won by Team of Austria.

26 men's individual events on 17 different venues in 9 countries were organised on two different continents (Europe and Asia); two individual cancelled events in Harrachov both rescheduled (due to bad weather) to Engelberg and Zakopane. There were also five Men's team events.

This was the last men only World Cup and also Adam Małysz's last season before retirement.

Peaks of the season FIS Nordic World Ski Championships (at completely renewed futuristic Holmenkollbakken), the Four Hills Tournament and FIS Team Tour.

== World records ==
List of world record distances achieved within this World Cup season.

Date	Athlete	Hill	Round	Place	Metres	Feet
11 February 2011	(Norway) Johan Remen Evensen	Vikersundbakken HS225	Training – R1	Vikersund, Norway	243	797
11 February 2011	(Norway) Johan Remen Evensen	Vikersundbakken HS225	Qualifications	Vikersund, Norway	246.5	809

== Map of world cup hosts ==
Europe
Germany	Austria	Asia

== Calendar ==
=== Men's Individual ===
L – large hill / F – flying hill
All	No.	Date	Place (Hill)	Size	Winner	Second	Third	Overall leader	R.
733	1	28 November 2010	(Finland) Kuusamo (Rukatunturi HS142)	L _{512}	(Austria) Andreas Kofler	(Austria) Thomas Morgenstern	(Switzerland) Simon Ammann	(Austria) Andreas Kofler	
734	2	1 December 2010	(Finland) Kuopio (Puijo HS127)	L _{513}	(Finland) Ville Larinto	(Finland) Matti Hautamäki	(Switzerland) Simon Ammann	(Austria) Andreas Kofler	
735	3	4 December 2010	(Norway) Lillehammer (Lysgårdsbakken HS138)	L _{514}	(Austria) Thomas Morgenstern	(Norway) Johan Remen Evensen	(Norway) Tom Hilde	(Austria) Thomas Morgenstern	
736	4	5 December 2010	(Norway) Lillehammer (Lysgårdsbakken HS138)	L _{515}	(Austria) Thomas Morgenstern	(Finland) Ville Larinto	(Switzerland) Simon Ammann	(Austria) Thomas Morgenstern	
		11 December 2010	(Czech Republic) Harrachov (Čerťák HS142)	L _{cnx}	cancelled due to strong winds and heavy snow; rescheduled at Sunday on 12 December and cancelled again (finally rescheduled to Engelberg on 17 December 2010)			—	
		12 December 2010	(Czech Republic) Harrachov (Čerťák HS142)	L _{cnx}	cancelled due to strong and rescheduled to Zakopane on 23 January			—	
737	5	(Note: Cancelled event from Harrachov (11 December 2010) was rescheduled to Engelberg (17 December 2010). With one round competition only.)17 December 2010	(Switzerland) Engelberg (Gross-Titlis HS137)	L _{516}	(Austria) Thomas Morgenstern	(Austria) Andreas Kofler	(Austria) Wolfgang Loitzl	(Austria) Thomas Morgenstern	
738	6	18 December 2010	(Switzerland) Engelberg (Gross-Titlis HS137)	L _{517}	(Austria) Thomas Morgenstern	(Poland) Adam Małysz	(Finland) Matti Hautamäki	(Austria) Thomas Morgenstern	
739	7	19 December 2010	(Switzerland) Engelberg (Gross-Titlis HS137)	L _{518}	(Austria) Andreas Kofler	(Austria) Thomas Morgenstern	(Poland) Adam Małysz	(Austria) Thomas Morgenstern	
740	8	29 December 2010	(Germany) Oberstdorf (Schattenberg HS137)	L _{519}	(Austria) Thomas Morgenstern	(Finland) Matti Hautamäki	(Austria) Manuel Fettner	(Austria) Thomas Morgenstern	
741	9	1 January 2011	(Germany) Garmisch-Pa (Gr. Olympiaschanze HS140)	L _{520}	(Switzerland) Simon Ammann	(Russia) Pavel Karelin	(Poland) Adam Małysz	(Austria) Thomas Morgenstern	
742	10	3 January 2011	(Austria) Innsbruck (Bergiselschanze HS130)	L _{521}	(Austria) Thomas Morgenstern	(Poland) Adam Małysz	(Norway) Tom Hilde	(Austria) Thomas Morgenstern	
743	11	6 January 2011	(Austria) Bischofshofen (Paul-Ausserleitner HS140)	L _{522}	(Norway) Tom Hilde	(Austria) Thomas Morgenstern	(Austria) Andreas Kofler	(Austria) Thomas Morgenstern	
59th Four Hills Tournament Overall (29 December 2010 – 6 January 2011)					(Austria) Thomas Morgenstern	(Switzerland) Simon Ammann	(Norway) Tom Hilde	4H Tournament	
744	12	8 January 2011	(Czech Republic) Harrachov (Čerťák HS205)	F _{079}	(Austria) Martin Koch	(Austria) Thomas Morgenstern	(Poland) Adam Małysz	(Austria) Thomas Morgenstern	
745	13	9 January 2011	(Czech Republic) Harrachov (Čerťák HS205)	F _{080}	(Austria) Thomas Morgenstern	(Switzerland) Simon Ammann	(Czech Republic) Roman Koudelka	(Austria) Thomas Morgenstern	
746	14	15 January 2011	(Japan) Sapporo (Ōkurayama HS134)	L _{523}	(Germany) Severin Freund	(Austria) Thomas Morgenstern	(Poland) Adam Małysz	(Austria) Thomas Morgenstern	
747	15	16 January 2011	(Japan) Sapporo (Ōkurayama HS134)	L _{524}	(Austria) Andreas Kofler	(Germany) Severin Freund	(Austria) Thomas Morgenstern	(Austria) Thomas Morgenstern	
748	16	21 January 2011	(Poland) Zakopane (Wielka Krokiew HS134)	L _{525}	(Poland) Adam Małysz	(Austria) Andreas Kofler	(Germany) Severin Freund	(Austria) Thomas Morgenstern	
749	17	22 January 2011	(Poland) Zakopane (Wielka Krokiew HS134)	L _{526}	(Switzerland) Simon Ammann	(Austria) Thomas Morgenstern	(Norway) Tom Hilde	(Austria) Thomas Morgenstern	
750	18	(Note: Cancelled event from Harrachov (12 December 2010) was rescheduled to Zakopane (23 January 2011).)23 January 2011	(Poland) Zakopane (Wielka Krokiew HS134)	L _{527}	(Poland) Kamil Stoch	(Norway) Tom Hilde	(Germany) Michael Uhrmann	(Austria) Thomas Morgenstern	
751	19	30 January 2011	(Germany) Willingen (Mühlenkopf HS145)	L _{528}	(Germany) Severin Freund	(Austria) Martin Koch	(Switzerland) Simon Ammann	(Austria) Thomas Morgenstern	
752	20	2 February 2011	(Germany) Klingenthal (Vogtland Arena HS140)	L _{529}	(Poland) Kamil Stoch	(Austria) Thomas Morgenstern	(Switzerland) Simon Ammann	(Austria) Thomas Morgenstern	
753	21	5 February 2011	(Germany) Oberstdorf (Heini-Klopfer HS213)	F _{081}	(Austria) Martin Koch	(Norway) Tom Hilde	(Austria) Gregor Schlierenzauer	(Austria) Thomas Morgenstern	
3rd FIS Team Tour Overall; TWO TEAM EVENTS INCLUDED (30 January – 6 February 2011)					Austria	Norway	Germany	FIS Team Tour	
754	22	12 February 2011	(Norway) Vikersund (Vikersundbakken HS225)	F _{082}	(Austria) Gregor Schlierenzauer (Norway) Johan Remen Evensen		(Switzerland) Simon Ammann	(Austria) Thomas Morgenstern	
755	23	13 February 2011	(Norway) Vikersund (Vikersundbakken HS225)	F _{083}	(Austria) Gregor Schlierenzauer	(Norway) Johan Remen Evensen	(Poland) Adam Małysz	(Austria) Thomas Morgenstern	
FIS Nordic World Ski Championships 2011 (26 February – 3 March • (Norway) Oslo)
756	24	13 March 2011	(Finland) Lahti (Salpausselkä HS130)	L _{530}	(Switzerland) Simon Ammann	(Austria) Andreas Kofler	(Germany) Severin Freund	(Austria) Thomas Morgenstern	
757	25	18 March 2011	(Slovenia) Planica (Letalnica b. Gorišek HS215)	F _{084}	(Austria) Gregor Schlierenzauer	(Austria) Thomas Morgenstern	(Austria) Martin Koch	(Austria) Thomas Morgenstern	
758	26	(Note: There was only one round in the competition due to bad weather in Planica (20 March 2011).)20 March 2011	(Slovenia) Planica (Letalnica b. Gorišek HS215)	F _{085}	(Poland) Kamil Stoch	(Slovenia) Robert Kranjec	(Poland) Adam Małysz	(Austria) Thomas Morgenstern	
32nd FIS World Cup Overall (28 November 2010 – 20 March 2011)					(Austria) Thomas Morgenstern	(Switzerland) Simon Ammann	(Poland) Adam Małysz	World Cup Overall	

=== Men's Team ===
All	No.	Date	Place (Hill)	Size	Winner	Second	Third	R.
50	1	27 November 2010	(Finland) Kuusamo (Rukatunturi HS142)	L _{040}	Austria Thomas Morgenstern; Wolfgang Loitzl; Andreas Kofler; Gregor Schlierenzauer	Norway Bjørn Einar Romøren; Anders Bardal; Anders Jacobsen; Tom Hilde	Japan Shōhei Tochimoto; Noriaki Kasai; Taku Takeuchi; Daiki Ito	
51	2	29 January 2011	(Germany) Willingen (Mühlenkopfschanze HS145)	L _{041}	Austria Thomas Morgenstern; Martin Koch; Andreas Kofler; Gregor Schlierenzauer	Germany Severin Freund; Michael Neumayer; Martin Schmitt; Michael Uhrmann	Poland Adam Małysz; Kamil Stoch; Stefan Hula; Piotr Żyła	
52	3	6 February 2011	(Germany) Oberstdorf (Heini-Klopfer HS213)	F _{010}	Austria Thomas Morgenstern; Andreas Kofler; Gregor Schlierenzauer; Martin Koch	Norway Johan Remen Evensen; Anders Jacobsen; Bjørn Einar Romøren; Tom Hilde	Germany Michael Neumayer; Richard Freitag; Michael Uhrmann; Severin Freund	
3rd FIS Team Tour Overall; THREE INDIVIDUAL EVENTS INCLUDED (30 January – 6 February 2011)					Austria	Norway	Germany	
53	4	12 March 2011	(Finland) Lahti (Salpausselkä HS130)	L _{042}	Austria Gregor Schlierenzauer; Martin Koch; Andreas Kofler; Thomas Morgenstern	Norway Anders Bardal; Johan Remen Evensen; Anders Jacobsen; Tom Hilde	Poland Tomasz Byrt; Piotr Żyła; Kamil Stoch; Adam Małysz	
54	5	19 March 2011	(Slovenia) Planica (Letalnica Bratov Gorišek HS215)	F _{011}	Austria Gregor Schlierenzauer; Martin Koch; Andreas Kofler; Thomas Morgenstern	Norway Anders Bardal; Johan Remen Evensen; Bjørn Einar Romøren; Tom Hilde	Slovenia Peter Prevc; Jernej Damjan; Jurij Tepeš; Robert Kranjec	

== Standings ==
=== Overall ===
Rank	after 26 events	Points
1	(Austria) Thomas Morgenstern	1757
2	(Switzerland) Simon Ammann	1364
3	(Poland) Adam Małysz	1153
4	(Austria) Andreas Kofler	1128
5	(Norway) Tom Hilde	903
6	(Austria) Martin Koch	840
7	(Germany) Severin Freund	769
8	(Finland) Matti Hautamäki	764
9	(Austria) Gregor Schlierenzauer	761
10	(Poland) Kamil Stoch	739

=== Ski Flying ===
Rank	after 7 events	Points
1	(Austria) Gregor Schlierenzauer	475
2	(Austria) Martin Koch	387
3	(Austria) Thomas Morgenstern	378
4	(Poland) Adam Małysz	347
5	(Switzerland) Simon Ammann	311
6	(Norway) Johan Remen Evensen	291
7	(Norway) Tom Hilde	263
8	(Slovenia) Robert Kranjec	242
9	(Poland) Kamil Stoch	241
10	(Finland) Matti Hautamäki	146

=== Nations Cup ===
Rank	after 31 events	Points
1	Austria	7508
2	Norway	4683
3	Poland	3239
4	Germany	3155
5	Finland	2443
6	Japan	1697
7	Slovenia	1668
8	Switzerland	1364
9	Czech Republic	1091
10	Russia	446

=== Four Hills Tournament ===
Rank	after 4 events	Points
1	(Austria) Thomas Morgenstern	958.8
2	(Switzerland) Simon Ammann	928.4
3	(Norway) Tom Hilde	895.0
4	(Austria) Manuel Fettner	882.4
5	(Austria) Martin Koch	880.9
6	(Poland) Adam Małysz	875.2
7	(Finland) Matti Hautamäki	861.8
8	(Austria) Andreas Kofler	840.5
9	(Austria) Wolfgang Loitzl	834.5
10	(Norway) Anders Jacobsen	830.7

=== Prize money ===
Rank	after 31 events	CHF
1	(Austria) Thomas Morgenstern	213,200
2	(Austria) Andreas Kofler	150,300
3	(Switzerland) Simon Ammann	136,400
4	(Poland) Adam Małysz	124,200
5	(Austria) Martin Koch	114,000
6	(Austria) Gregor Schlierenzauer	112,500
7	(Norway) Tom Hilde	112,150
8	(Germany) Severin Freund	86,700
9	(Finland) Matti Hautamäki	82,750
10	(Poland) Kamil Stoch	79,950

=== FIS Team Tour ===
Rank	after 5 events	Points
1	Austria	4564.2
2	Norway	4312.8
3	Germany	4302.6
4	Poland	4219.9
5	Finland	4135.8
6	Japan	3934.2
7	Czech Republic	3823.8
8	Slovenia	3751.8
9	Russia	1731.7
10	Italy	1265.5

== See also ==
- 2010 Grand Prix (top level summer series)
- 2010–11 FIS Continental Cup (2nd level competition)
