= FIS Nordic World Ski Championships 2011 – Team large hill =

Men's team large hill at the FIS Nordic World Ski Championships 2011
- Venue: Holmenkollbakken
- Date: 5 March 2011
- Competitors: 40 from 10 nations
- Teams: 10

The men's team large hill ski jumping event at the FIS Nordic World Ski Championships 2011 was held 5 March 2011 at 15:30 CET. Austria's team of Wolfgang Loitzl, Martin Koch, Thomas Morgenstern, and Gregor Schlierenzauer are the defending world champions and are the Olympic champions with Loitzl, Andreas Kofler, Morgenstern, and Schlierenzauer.

== Results ==
Rank	Bib	Country	Distance (m)	Points
1st place, gold medalist(s)	10	Austria; Gregor Schlierenzauer; Martin Koch; Andreas Kofler; Thomas Morgenstern	125.5; 118.5; 141.0; 140.5	500.0; 120.0; 106.8; 132.2; 141.0
2nd place, silver medalist(s)	9	Norway; Anders Jacobsen; Johan Remen Evensen; Anders Bardal; Tom Hilde	120.5; 119.0; 127.5; 127.5	456.4; 107.1; 104.0; 119.9; 125.4
3rd place, bronze medalist(s)	4	Slovenia; Peter Prevc; Jurij Tepeš; Jernej Damjan; Robert Kranjec	109.0; 120.0; 127.5; 136.0	452.6; 87.9; 106.9; 117.2; 140.6
4	8	Germany; Martin Schmitt; Richard Freitag; Severin Freund; Michael Uhrmann	124.5; 132.0; 128.0; 110.0	451.9; 108.2; 128.0; 124.8; 90.9
5	7	Poland; Kamil Stoch; Piotr Żyła; Stefan Hula; Adam Małysz	113.5; 127.0; 113.5; 135.5	435.6; 100.6; 118.0; 93.8; 123.2
6	5	Japan; Taku Takeuchi; Fumihisa Yumoto; Noriaki Kasai; Daiki Ito	115.5; 111.0; 125.5; 123.0	410.7; 102.8; 83.7; 113.3; 110.9
7	6	Finland; Matti Hautamäki; Olli Muotka; Anssi Koivuranta; Janne Ahonen	125.0; 101.0; 124.5; 117.5	408.3; 113.0; 74.0; 119.2; 102.1
8	3	Czech Republic; Jakub Janda; Lukáš Hlava; Jan Matura; Roman Koudelka	117.0; 119.0; 114.5; 106.0	387.7; 106.6; 104.4; 98.0; 78.7
9	2	Russia; Pavel Karelin; Denis Kornilov; Ilya Rosliakov; Dimitry Vassiliev	119.5; 122.5; DSQ; 100.5	285.5; 109.7; 109.0; 0.0; 66.8
10	1	Kazakhstan; Alexey Korolev; Evgeni Levkin; Nikolay Karpenko; Radik Zhaparov	86.5; 104.5; 106.5; 100.0	265.2; 46.9; 73.4; 78.4; 66.5
