= FIS Nordic World Ski Championships 2011 – Men's team normal hill =

Men's team normal hill at the FIS Nordic World Ski Championships 2011
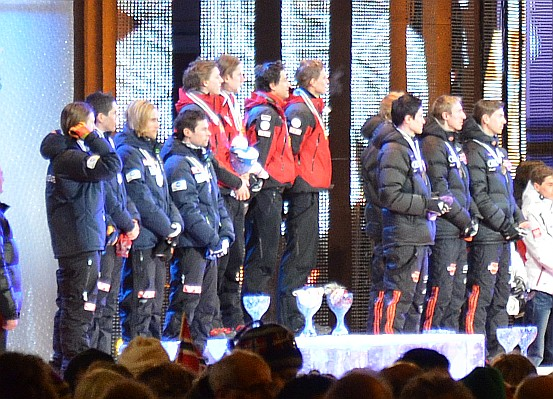
- The podium
- Venue: Midtstubakken
- Date: 27 February 2011
- Competitors: 48 from 12 nations
- Teams: 12
- Winning score: 1025.5

Medalists
gold medal	Gregor Schlierenzauer; Martin Koch; Andreas Kofler; Thomas Morgenstern	Austria
silver medal	Anders Jacobsen; Bjørn Einar Romøren; Anders Bardal; Tom Hilde	Norway
bronze medal	Martin Schmitt; Michael Neumayer; Michael Uhrmann; Severin Freund	Germany

The Men's team normal hill ski jumping event at the FIS Nordic World Ski Championships 2011 was held 27 February 2011 at 15:00 CET. This event was last held at the 2005 championships in Oberstdorf and was won by the Austrian team of Loitzl, Andreas Widhölzl, Thomas Morgenstern, and Martin Höllwarth.

== Results ==
Rank	Bib	Country	Round 1 Distance (m)	Round 1 Points	Round 1 Rank	Final Round Distance (m)	Final Round Points	Final Round Rank	Total Points
1st place, gold medalist(s)	12	Austria; Gregor Schlierenzauer; Martin Koch; Andreas Kofler; Thomas Morgenstern	105.0; 105.5; 105.0; 105.0	525.4; 128.4; 134.8; 130.7; 131.5	1	103.0; 102.0; 103.5; 108.0	500.1; 121.5; 124.0; 124.0; 130.6	1	1025.5
2nd place, silver medalist(s)	11	Norway; Anders Jacobsen; Bjørn Einar Romøren; Anders Bardal; Tom Hilde	103.5; 101.5; 105.5; 102.5	514.7; 130.0; 125.2; 133.4; 126.1	2	102.5; 100.5; 101.0; 102.5	485.8; 122.5; 117.3; 122.5; 123.5	2	1000.5
3rd place, bronze medalist(s)	10	Germany; Martin Schmitt; Michael Neumayer; Michael Uhrmann; Severin Freund	104.5; 101.0; 102.0; 105.0	502.7; 126.5; 121.4; 123.3; 131.5	3	104.0; 99.5; 102.5; 105.5	465.5; 122.8; 112.9; 120.4; 109.4	5	968.2
4	9	Poland; Kamil Stoch; Piotr Żyła; Stefan Hula; Adam Małysz	101.0; 98.0; 97.5; 104.5	476.4; 124.3; 115.2; 110.2; 126.7	4	102.5; 101.0; 93.0; 106.5	476.6; 123.0; 120.4; 102.7; 130.5	3	953.0
5	7	Japan; Fumihisa Yumoto; Taku Takeuchi; Noriaki Kasai; Daiki Ito	95.0; 100.5; 99.5; 100.5	467.5; 109.6; 120.1; 115.0; 122.8	6	95.5; 100.5; 96.5; 105.5	463.6; 108.6; 116.6; 110.5; 127.9	6	931.1
6	5	Slovenia; Mitja Mežnar; Jernej Damjan; Robert Kranjec; Peter Prevc	95.0; 94.5; 101.0; 99.0	455.1; 109.4; 108.1; 119.4; 118.2	7	100.0; 99.0; 100.0; 99.5	469.1; 116.9; 115.4; 120.2; 116.6	4	924.2
7	4	Czech Republic; Borek Sedlák; Roman Koudelka; Jan Matura; Jakub Janda	92.5; 99.5; 101.0; 101.0	468.3; 107.2; 118.4; 120.6; 122.1	5	95.0; 102.0; 97.0; 96.5	449.6; 106.4; 120.1; 112.0; 111.1	8	917.9
8	8	Finland; Anssi Koivuranta; Olli Muotka; Janne Ahonen; Matti Hautamäki	90.0; 95.0; 100.0; 102.5	446.8; 100.1; 106.4; 116.3; 124.0	8	97.0; 95.5; 94.5; 108.0	453.7; 111.9; 103.2; 104.8; 133.8	7	900.5
9	3	Russia; Pavel Karelin; Denis Kornilov; Ilya Rosliakov; Dimitry Vassiliev	98.0; 98.5; 96.5; 92.0	444.8; 118.2; 117.0; 108.8; 100.8	9				444.8
10	6	Switzerland; Pascal Egloff; Andreas Küttel; Marco Grigoli; Simon Ammann	87.0; 93.5; 92.5; 101.0	418.2; 87.6; 104.5; 101.5; 124.6	10				418.2
11	2	Italy; Davide Bresadola; Diego Dellasega; Andrea Morassi; Sebastian Colloredo	94.0; 89.5; 94.5; 95.5	417.8; 106.6; 95.1; 105.9; 110.2	11				417.8
12	1	Kazakhstan; Radik Zhaparov; Alexey Korolev; Nikolay Karpenko; Evgeni Levkin	93.5; 82.0; 93.5; 85.0	366.2; 104.7; 77.6; 101.4; 82.5	12				366.2
