= Ski jumping at the 2010 Winter Olympics – Large hill team =

Men's large hill team at the XXI Olympic Winter Games
- Venue: Whistler Olympic Park
- Dates: 22 February 2010
- Competitors: 48 (12 teams) from 12 nations
- Winning score: 1,107.9

Medalists
1st place, gold medalist(s)		Wolfgang Loitzl; Andreas Kofler; Thomas Morgenstern; Gregor Schlierenzauer	Austria
2nd place, silver medalist(s)		Michael Neumayer; Andreas Wank; Martin Schmitt; Michael Uhrmann	Germany
3rd place, bronze medalist(s)		Anders Bardal; Tom Hilde; Johan Remen Evensen; Anders Jacobsen	Norway

The men's large hill team ski jumping competition for the 2010 Winter Olympics in Vancouver, Canada was held at Whistler Olympic Park in Whistler, British Columbia on 22 February. The Austrian team of Andreas Widhölzl, Martin Koch, Andreas Kofler, and Thomas Morgenstern were the defending Olympic champions in this event. Widhölzl retired after the 2007-08 season. Austria was also the defending world champions in this event with the team of Wolfgang Loitzl, Koch, Morgenstern, and Gregor Schlierenzauer. The last World Cup event in this format prior to the 2010 Games took place at Willingen, Germany on 7 February 2010 and was won by the German team of Michael Neumayer, Pascal Bodmer, Martin Schmitt, and Michael Uhrmann.

== Results ==
Austria defended their Olympic title with Schlierenzauer and Loitzl replacing Widhölzl and Koch, respectively. Germany won the silver with Wank replacing Bodmer. Schlierenzauer's 146.5 meter jump was the longest in Olympic history, breaking the record which Switzerland's Simon Ammann had set in the large hill event two days earlier. The Swiss did not participate in that event as they had only sent two ski jumpers to the Olympics.

			Round 1			Final round			Total
Rank	Bib	Country	Distance (m)	Points	Rank	Distance (m)	Points	Rank	Points
1st place, gold medalist(s)	12	Austria; Wolfgang Loitzl; Andreas Kofler; Thomas Morgenstern; Gregor Schlierenzauer	138.0; 132.0; 135.5; 140.5	547.3; 140.4; 126.1; 135.9; 144.9	1	138.5; 142.0; 135.0; 146.5	560.6; 141.8; 138.6; 135.0; 145.2	1	1,107.9
2nd place, silver medalist(s)	11	Germany; Michael Neumayer; Andreas Wank; Martin Schmitt; Michael Uhrmann	137.0; 128.5; 128.0; 135.0	509.3; 135.6; 120.3; 119.9; 133.5	2	136.5; 139.0; 122.0; 140.0	526.5; 134.7; 141.7; 106.6; 143.5	2	1,035.8
3rd place, bronze medalist(s)	10	Norway; Anders Bardal; Tom Hilde; Johan Remen Evensen; Anders Jacobsen	128.0; 127.5; 131.5; 138.0	504.0; 118.4; 118.5; 126.7; 140.4	3	127.0; 139.0; 129.5; 140.5	526.3; 117.1; 141.7; 122.1; 145.4	3	1,030.3
4	9	Finland; Matti Hautamäki; Janne Happonen; Kalle Keituri; Harri Olli	133.5; 128.5; 123.0; 134.0	490.2; 129.8; 120.3; 108.4; 131.7	4	130.0; 139.0; 132.0; 134.5	524.4; 123.5; 142.2; 126.6; 132.1	4	1,014.6
5	6	Japan; Daiki Ito; Taku Takeuchi; Shōhei Tochimoto; Noriaki Kasai	129.5; 125.5; 128.0; 133.5	484.7; 122.1; 113.4; 118.4; 130.8	5	133.5; 129.5; 132.0; 140.0	523.0; 130.8; 122.1; 126.6; 143.5	5	1,007.7
6	8	Poland; Stefan Hula; Łukasz Rutkowski; Kamil Stoch; Adam Małysz	129.0; 123.0; 126.5; 136.5	484.0; 122.2; 108.4; 116.2; 137.2	6	127.5; 127.5; 134.5; 139.5	512.7; 118.5; 118.5; 132.6; 143.1	6	996.7
7	5	Czech Republic; Antonín Hájek; Roman Koudelka; Lukáš Hlava; Jakub Janda	129.0; 131.0; 125.0; 128.0	477.4; 121.2; 124.3; 112.5; 119.4	7	135.0; 135.5; 126.0; 129.0	504.4; 134.0; 134.4; 114.3; 121.7	7	981.8
8	7	Slovenia; Primoz Pikl; Mitja Mežnar; Peter Prevc; Robert Kranjec	124.0; 126.5; 132.0; 129.0	472.2; 109.2; 114.7; 127.1; 121.2	8	119.5; 131.0; 127.5; 139.0	486.6; 102.1; 124.3; 118.0; 142.2	8	958.8
9	3	France; Vincent Descombes Sevoie; David Lazzaroni; Alexandre Mabboux; Emmanuel Chedal	125.0; 125.0; 108.5; 127.5	419.8; 111.0; 112.0; 78.8; 118.0	9	did not advance			419.8
10	4	Russia; Pavel Karelin; Denis Kornilov; Ilya Rosliakov; Dimitry Ipatov	114.5; 129.5; 119.5; 118.5	414.1; 90.6; 122.1; 101.1; 100.3	10	did not advance			414.1
11	2	United States; Anders Johnson; Peter Frenette; Taylor Fletcher; Nicholas Alexander	115.5; 124.5; 88.5; 119.0	340.0; 92.4; 111.1; 36.3; 100.2	11	did not advance			340.0
12	1	Canada; Mackenzie Boyd-Clowes; Trevor Morrice; Eric Mitchell; Stefan Read	105.0; 101.0; 102.0; 114.0	294.6; 72.0; 64.8; 66.6; 91.2	12	did not advance			294.6
