= FIS Nordic World Ski Championships 2011 =

2011 edition of the FIS Nordic World Ski Championships

- Official logo for the FIS Nordic World Ski Championships 2011.
- Host city: Oslo, Norway
- Nations: 49
- Events: 21
- Opening: 23 February 2011
- Closing: 6 March 2011
- Main venue: Holmenkollen National Arena
- Venues: Holmenkollbakken; Midtstubakken
- Website: Oslo2011.no

The FIS Nordic World Ski Championships 2011 took place from 23 February to 6 March 2011 in Oslo, Norway, at the Holmenkollen National Arena. It was the fifth time these championships had been hosted in Holmenkollen, having been done previously in 1930, the 1952 Winter Olympics, 1966, and 1982. On 25 May 2006, the 45th FIS Congress in Vilamoura, Portugal, selected the Holmenkollen area over both Val di Fiemme, Italy, and Zakopane, Poland, with a vote of 12 to 4 to 0. These games coincided with the Holmenkollen Ski Festival as they have previously in 1930, 1952, 1966, and 1982.

Cross-country skiing was dominated by Norway; Marit Bjørgen won four gold and one silver, while Petter Northug won three gold and two silver. Canada, with Devon Kershaw and Alex Harvey took its first-ever victory with gold in the men's team sprint. Austria dominated the ski jumping, winning all five events: Thomas Morgenstern took three golds and one silver, Gregor Schlierenzauer won three golds, and Daniela Iraschko won the women's event. In the Nordic combined, Germany took four of the six individual medals, but lost both relays to Austria.

== Events ==
=== Cross-country skiing ===
==== Men ====
Event	Gold		Silver		Bronze	
15 kilometre classic	Matti Heikkinen; Finland	38:14.7	Eldar Rønning; Norway	+ 13.3	Martin Johnsrud Sundby; Norway	+ 31.9
30 kilometre skiathlon	Petter Northug; Norway	1:14:10.4	Maxim Vylegzhanin; Russia	+ 0.7	Ilia Chernousov; Russia	+ 1.2
50 kilometre freestyle mass start	Petter Northug; Norway	2:08:09.0	Maxim Vylegzhanin; Russia	+ 1.7	Tord Asle Gjerdalen; Norway	+ 6.3
4 × 10 kilometre relay	Norway; Martin Johnsrud Sundby; Eldar Rønning; Tord Asle Gjerdalen; Petter Northug	1:40:10.2	Sweden; Daniel Rickardsson; Johan Olsson; Anders Södergren; Marcus Hellner	+ 1.3	Germany; Jens Filbrich; Axel Teichmann; Franz Göring; Tobias Angerer	+ 5.7
Sprint freestyle	Marcus Hellner; Sweden	2:57.4	Petter Northug; Norway	+ 0.6	Emil Jönsson; Sweden	+ 1.1
Team sprint	Canada; Devon Kershaw; Alex Harvey	19:10.0	Norway; Petter Northug; Ola Vigen Hattestad	+ 0.2	Russia; Alexander Panzhinskiy; Nikita Kriukov	+ 0.5

==== Women ====
Event	Gold		Silver		Bronze	
10 kilometre classic	Marit Bjørgen; Norway	27:39.3	Justyna Kowalczyk; Poland	+ 4.1	Aino-Kaisa Saarinen; Finland	+ 9.7
15 kilometre skiathlon	Marit Bjørgen; Norway	38:08.6	Justyna Kowalczyk; Poland	+ 7.5	Therese Johaug; Norway	+ 8.8
30 kilometre freestyle mass start	Therese Johaug; Norway	1:23:45.1	Marit Bjørgen; Norway	+ 44.0	Justyna Kowalczyk; Poland	+ 1:34.0
4 × 5 kilometre relay	Norway; Vibeke Skofterud; Therese Johaug; Kristin Størmer Steira; Marit Bjørgen	53:30.0	Sweden; Ida Ingemarsdotter; Anna Haag; Britta Johansson Norgren; Charlotte Kalla	+36.1	Finland; Pirjo Muranen; Aino-Kaisa Saarinen; Riitta-Liisa Roponen; Krista Lähteenmäki	+59.8
Sprint freestyle	Marit Bjørgen; Norway	3:03.9	Arianna Follis; Italy	+ 0.2	Petra Majdič; Slovenia	+ 0.5
Team sprint	Sweden; Ida Ingemarsdotter; Charlotte Kalla	19:25.0	Finland; Aino-Kaisa Saarinen; Krista Lähteenmäki	+ 3.3	Norway; Maiken Caspersen Falla; Astrid Uhrenholdt Jacobsen	+ 4.1

=== Nordic combined ===
Event	Gold		Silver		Bronze	
Individual large hill/10 km	Jason Lamy Chappuis; France	25:31.6	Johannes Rydzek; Germany	+6.7	Eric Frenzel; Germany	+7.0
Individual normal hill/10 km	Eric Frenzel; Germany	25:19.2	Tino Edelmann; Germany	+11.9	Felix Gottwald; Austria	+18.4
Team normal hill/4 × 5 km	Austria; David Kreiner; Bernhard Gruber; Felix Gottwald; Mario Stecher	48:07.8	Germany; Johannes Rydzek; Björn Kircheisen; Tino Edelmann; Eric Frenzel	+0.4	Norway; Jan Schmid; Magnus Moan; Mikko Kokslien; Håvard Klemetsen	+40.6
Team large hill/4 × 5 km	Austria; Bernhard Gruber; David Kreiner; Felix Gottwald; Mario Stecher	47:12.3	Germany; Johannes Rydzek; Björn Kircheisen; Eric Frenzel; Tino Edelmann	+0.1	Norway; Mikko Kokslien; Håvard Klemetsen; Jan Schmid; Magnus Moan	+40.6

=== Ski jumping ===
==== Men ====
Event	Gold		Silver		Bronze	
Men's individual normal hill (HS106)	Thomas Morgenstern; Austria	269.2	Andreas Kofler; Austria	260.1	Adam Małysz; Poland	252.2
Men's individual large hill (HS134)	Gregor Schlierenzauer; Austria	277.5	Thomas Morgenstern; Austria	277.2	Simon Ammann; Switzerland	274.3
Men's team normal hill (HS106)	Austria; Gregor Schlierenzauer; Martin Koch; Andreas Kofler; Thomas Morgenstern	1025.5	Norway; Anders Jacobsen; Bjørn Einar Romøren; Anders Bardal; Tom Hilde	1000.5	Germany; Martin Schmitt; Michael Neumayer; Michael Uhrmann; Severin Freund	968.2
Men's team large hill (HS134)	Austria; Gregor Schlierenzauer; Martin Koch; Andreas Kofler; Thomas Morgenstern	500.0	Norway; Anders Jacobsen; Johan Remen Evensen; Anders Bardal; Tom Hilde	456.4	Slovenia; Peter Prevc; Jurij Tepeš; Jernej Damjan; Robert Kranjec	452.6

==== Women ====
Event	Gold		Silver		Bronze	
Women's individual normal hill (HS106)	Daniela Iraschko; Austria	231.7	Elena Runggaldier; Italy	218.9	Coline Mattel; France	211.5

== Organization ==
In 2002, the Association for the Promotion of Skiing and Oslo Municipality started the process of applying for the FIS Nordic World Ski Championships 2009. The city council decided to grant NOK 52.8 million to upgrade Holmenkollen, including Holmenkollbakken, for the 2009 World Championships. Oslo lost the vote in the International Ski Federation (FIS) against Liberec, Czech Republic, on 4 June 2004. The Norwegian Ski Federation subsequently stated that they would apply for the 2011 World Championships. The Association for the Promotion of Skiing stated that they wanted a new hill in Rødkleiva instead of expanding the existing ski flying hill in Vikersund, Vikersundbakken. Holmenkollbakken would then be used for the last time as a large hill during the 2011 World Championships, and would then be converted to a normal hill. In May 2005, the general assembly of the Norwegian Ski Federation voted to build a new ski flying and normal hill in Rødkleiva ahead of the 2011 World Championships. Following Vikersundbakken being awarded the FIS Ski-Flying World Championships 2012 in 2008, the general assembly of the Norwegian Ski Federation that year decided to terminate the plans for a ski flying hill in Rødkleiva.

On 22 September 2005, FIS stated that an all-new Holmenkollbakken would have to be built if Oslo was to host the world championships and World Cup tournaments. FIS stated that similar reconstructions had been done with Schattenbergschanze in Oberstdorf, Germany, and Bergiselschanze in Innsbrück, Austria. In December 2005, the Norwegian Directorate for Cultural Heritage gave permission for the tower to be demolished, on the condition it was replaced by a new in-run with a similar architectural quality and retain its function as a landmark. They stated that it was the activity itself that is worthy of preservation, not the structure itself. The city council made the final decision to apply for the world championships and build a new hill on 1 March 2006. A new hill was at the time estimated to cost NOK 310 million, and the state was willing to finance NOK 70 million of those. Oslo was awarded the 2011 World Championships in May 2006.

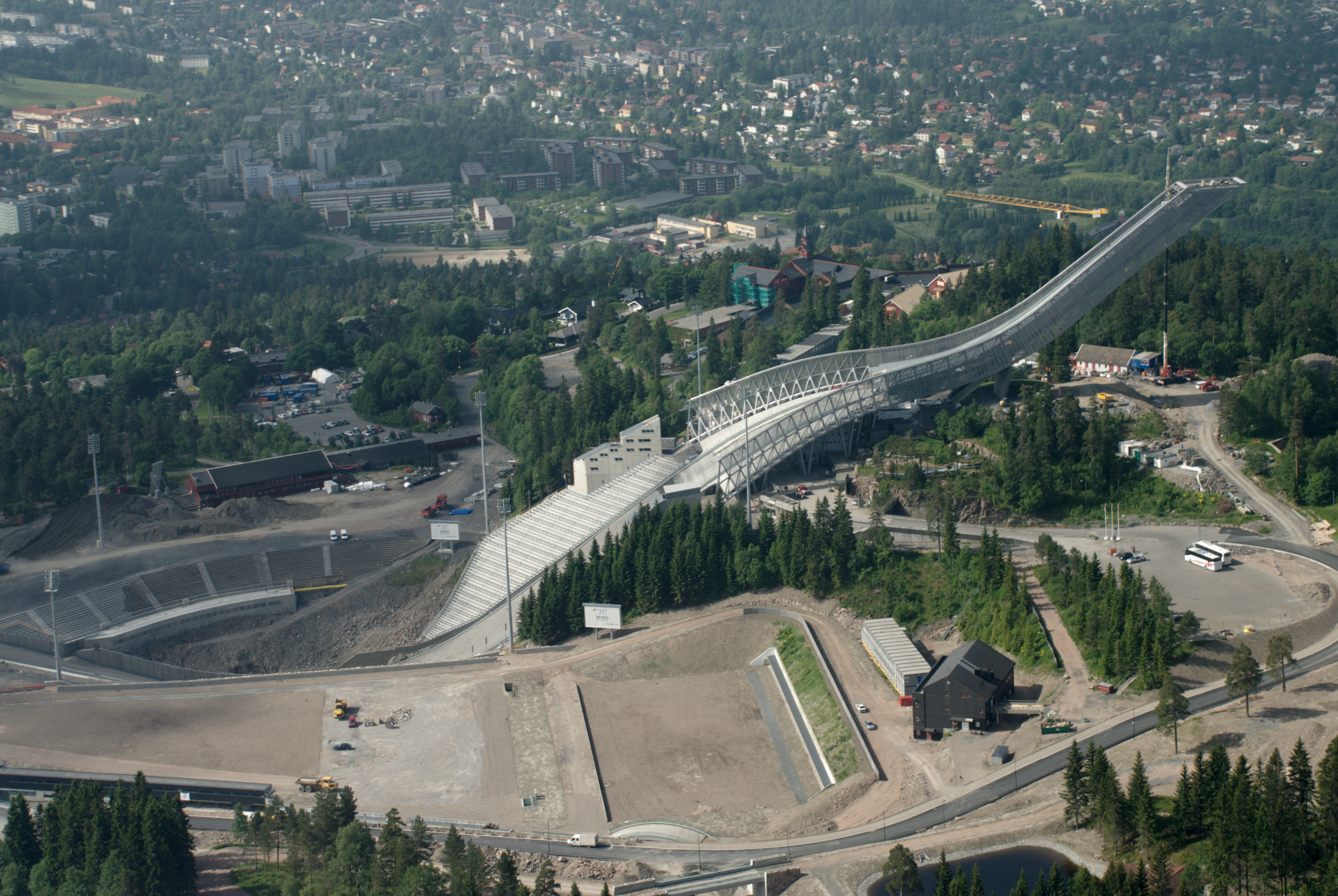
The new hill during construction; the ski stadium is in the foreground

The municipality issued an architectural design competition to rebuild the hill; Julien De Smedt's proposal was selected among 104 entrants. At the time, it was estimated that the new national arena would cost NOK 653 million. Demolition of Holmenkollbakken started on 16 October 2008. The World Cup tournament in 2009 was held at Vikersundbakken instead of Holmenkollen because of the reconstruction. When the decision to reconstruct the national arena was made by the city council in 2007, it was estimated to cost NOK 653 million. By 2008, the cost had accelerated to NOK 1.2 billion, and by the following year it had reached NOK 1.8 billion. City Commissioner For Business and Culture, Anette Wiig Bryn of the Progress Party, had to leave her position because of the cost overruns. A consultant report ordered by the municipality concluded that the pressure to find cost savings to stay within the budget, which was underestimated to start with, resulted in slower progress, which again resulted in higher costs. The costs of the new large hill were NOK 715 million, while total costs for the upgrade of the national arena and infrastructure ended at NOK 2,426 million. This included the construction of a new ski stadium next to Holmenkollbakken, and Midtstubakken, and upgrades to the Holmenkollen Line.

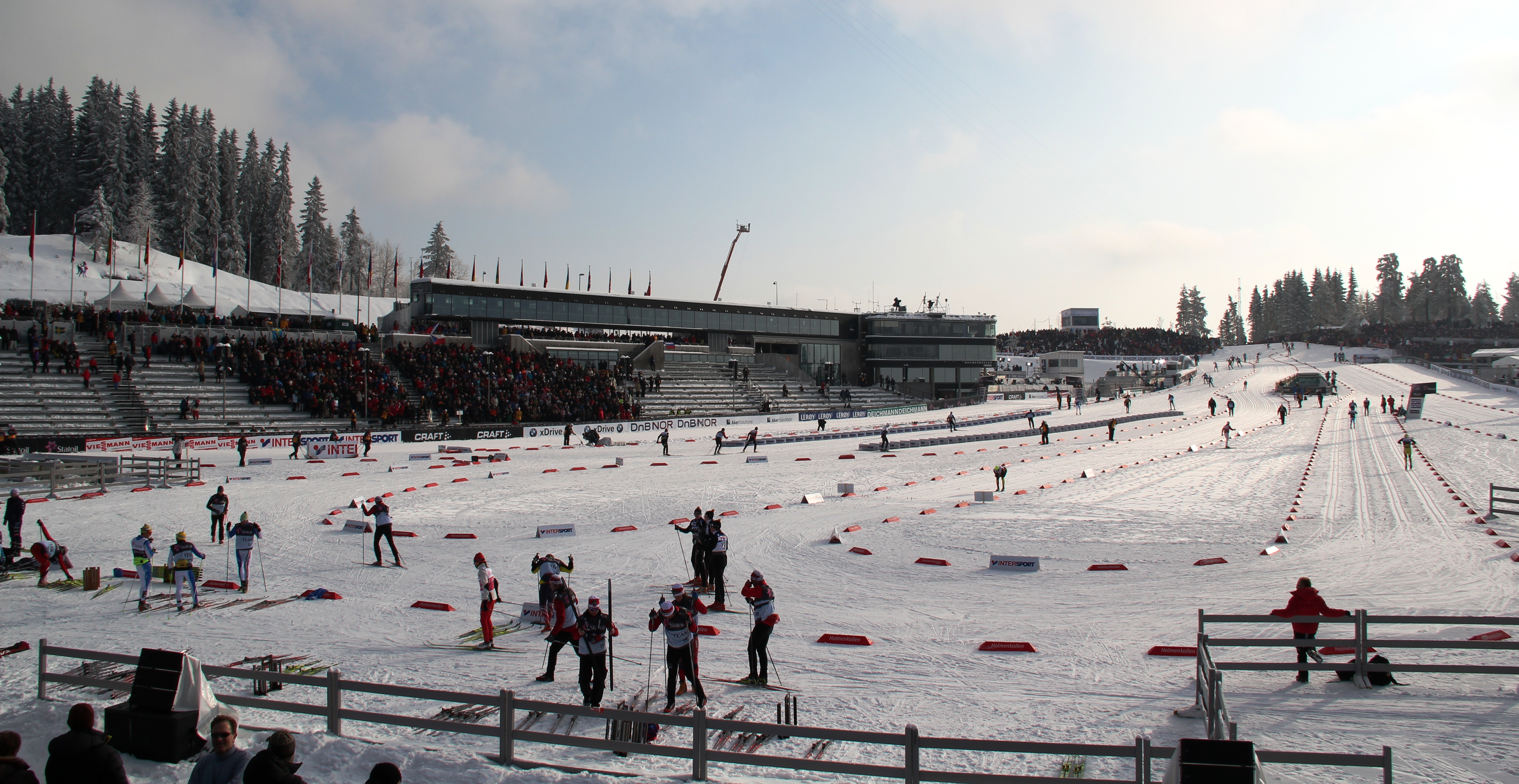
The ski stadium

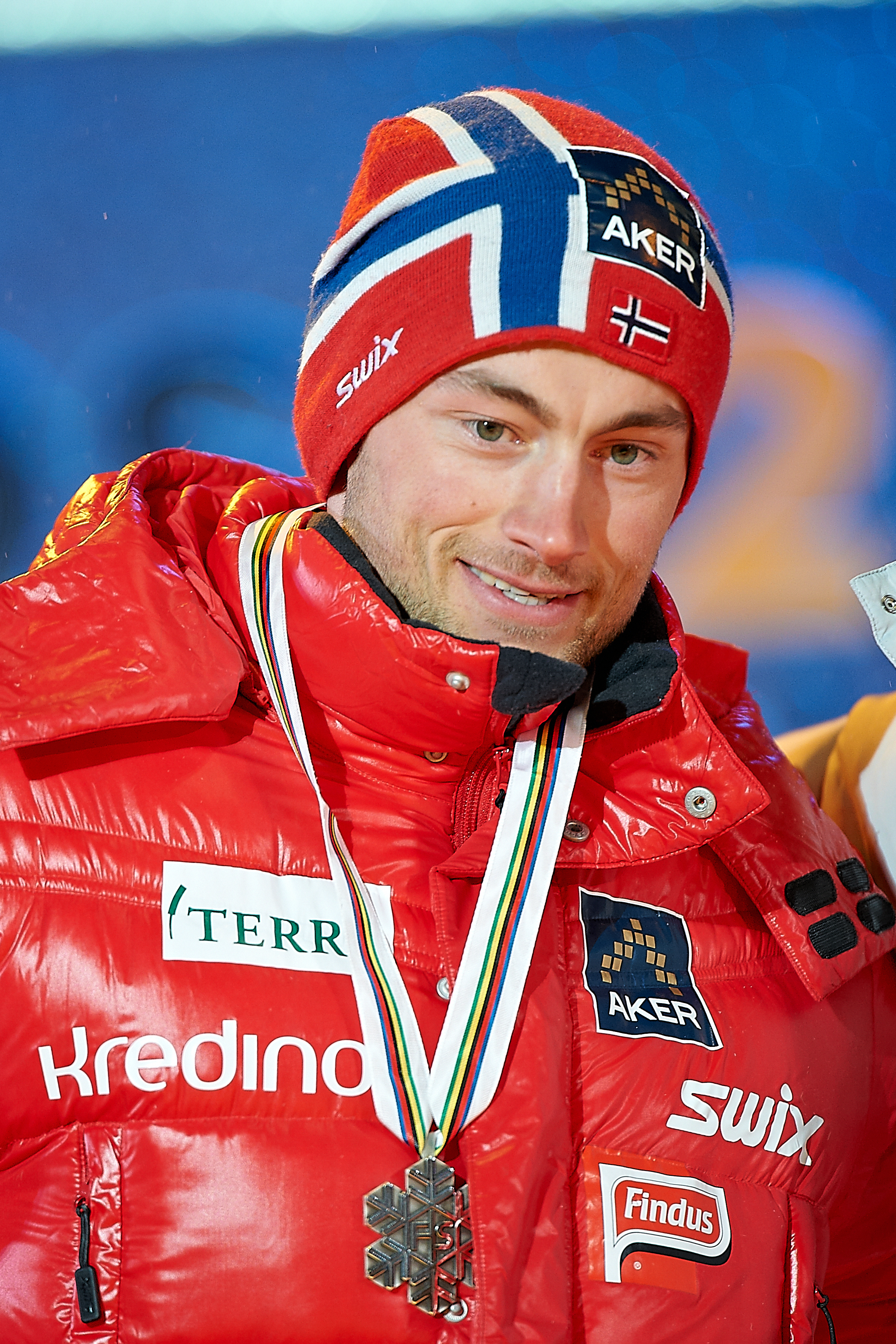
Petter Northug receiving his silver medal after the men's sprint

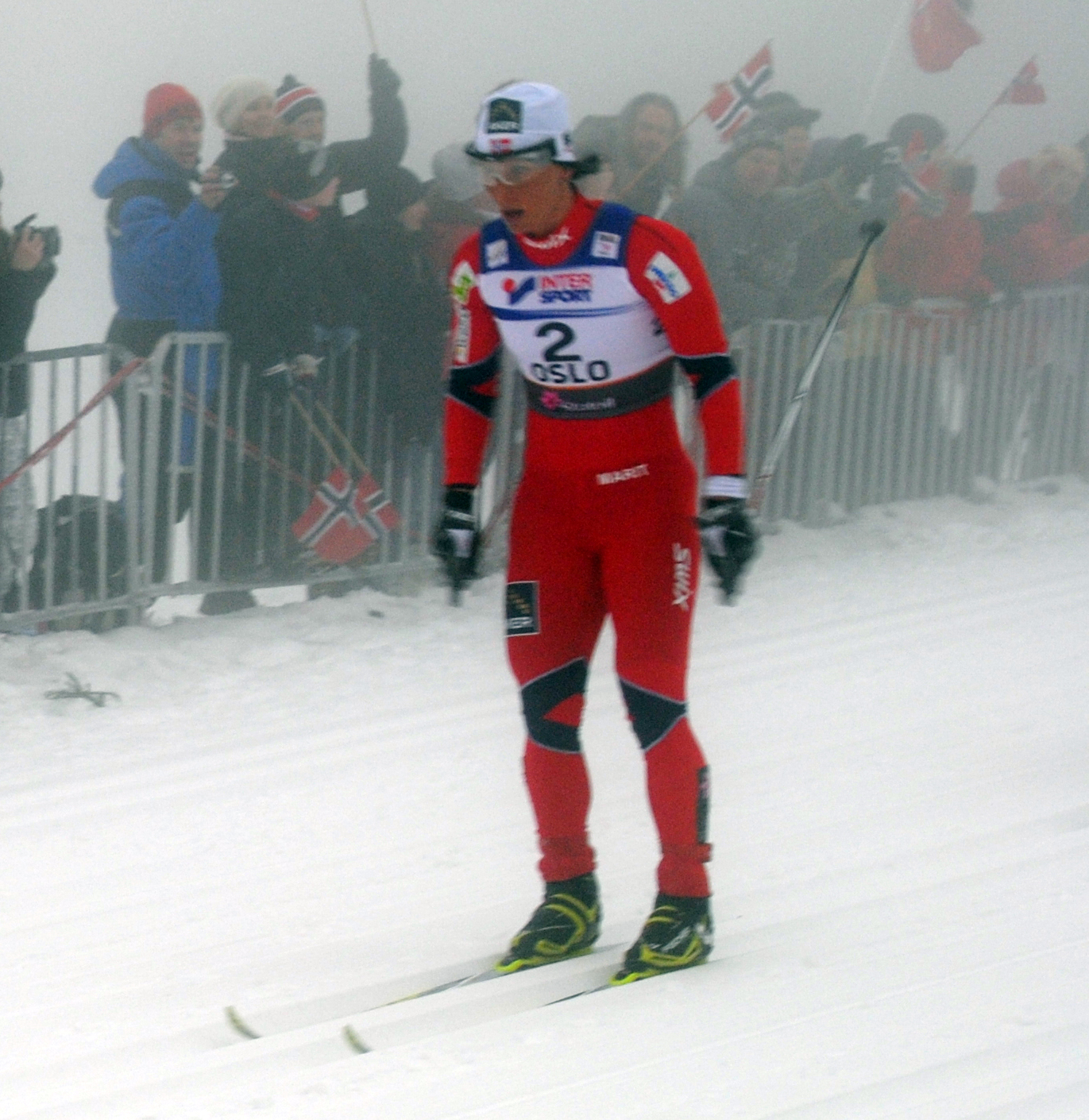
Marit Bjørgen at Frognerseteren during the women's 15 km pursuit, which she ultimately won

== Venue ==
Holmenkollbakken is a large ski jumping hill with a hill size of 134 and a construction point (K-spot) of 120. It has a spectator capacity for 30,000. The current structure dates from 2010 and consists of a 64 meters (210 ft) tall superstructure. The top of the structure is 420 meters (1,380 ft) above mean sea level. It is the first hill in the world with a permanent wind screen, which is able to restrain 45 to 50 percent of the wind. Midtstubakken is a normal hill with a hill size of 106 and a K-point of 95. It has a capacity for 16,000 spectators and was completed in 2010.

Medal ceremonies were held at Universitetsplassen, a square in the city center.

Transport is based on that no spectators will use private cars to the venue. Instead, all spectators must use the Holmenkollen Line of the Oslo Metro. Holmenkollen Station is located within walking distance of the large hill and cross-country stadium, while Midtstuen Station is closest to Midtstubakken. Holmenkollen Station is the only one on the line with platforms long enough for six cars, which allows a capacity of 9,000 per hour. "Chaotic" and "spectators stood in line for many hours to get into the arena" and "sheep are treated better", were some of the claims by Verdens Gang, in regards to the treatment of spectators on 26 February. A number of people were not admitted into the arena (in time to see Marit Bjørgen win) on 26 February. The director of the event, promised that the organizers would refund some tickets, after reviewing individual claims.

== Organizing committee (VM 2006–2011 AS) ==
=== 2006 ===
In the 6 September 2006 edition of the FIS Newsflash, the first orientation meeting of the local organization took place in Oslo on 4 September 2006. Included in the meeting were representatives from the Norwegian Ski Association, the FIS, Skiforeningen (The Holmenkollen organizing committee), NRK (Norwegian TV), and the European Broadcasting Union. Discussions involved were liaisons among the various groups, marketing of the event, arena and ski jump reconstruction, and testing of the new constructed sports arena that is scheduled for completion in 2010. Åsne Havnelid was appointed as chief executive officer of the event during the week of 2 July 2007, starting on 1 September 2007. The first official coordination group of Havnelid, Adelheid Sæther as Chief Operations Officer, and Stein Opsal as chief financial officer officially met on 13 November 2007. One of the key items discussed was the updated plans for the Holemkollen ski jump and the FIS requirements for the future of the ski jump. Construction of the ski jump has not started with the Oslo City Government and the City Council having review the project in more detail, especially the costs involved. In an August 2008 interview, Hanevild stated that the attendance goal for the championships was 400,000. During the week of 15 September 2008, it was reported that team is developing working practices and responsibilities of the different committee roles.

=== 2007 ===
Ski-vm 2007

=== 2008 ===
Ski-vm 2008

=== 2009 ===
The organizing committee for the 2009 championships in Liberec met in Oslo with the organizing committee of the 2011 championships on 20 April 2009 to discuss lessons learned. In the presentation was a comprehensive and frank analysis of the critical areas of Liberec's organization. Key success factors were detailed and lessons learned were elaborated, including several recommendations to both the 2011 championships and the organizing committee for the 2013 championships in Val di Fiemme, Italy. Besides the 2009, 2011 and 2013 organizing committees in attendance, other attendees included the Norwegian Ski Federation, the European Broadcasting Union television, FIS, and the APF marketing partners. At a coordination group meeting in Oslo on 3–4 September 2009, construction progress was shown on the ski jumps at Holmenkollen and Midstuen along with the renovations for the cross-country stadium and tracks. Given current construction, the organizing committee states that World Cup events will go as planned for March 2010 to serve as test events for the 2011 championships. As of September 2009, the organizing committee employed 20 people while host broadcaster NRK are taking advantage of the 3-D modeling for perfect camera angles for the event that will take place in February–March 2011. On 23 December 2009, the organizing committee announced that Statoil, an energy company based in Stavanger, will be joining Aker Solutions, Intersport, and Swedish-based Craft as a sponsor to the championships.

=== 2010 ===
Test events at the Holmenkollen took place the weekend of 12–14 March 2010 in all three disciplines. Prior to the competition, the organizing committee entered a deal where a Nissan dealership in Oslo supplied 33 vehicles during the test events. Switzerland's Simon Ammann, who won gold medals in both individual ski jumping events at the 2010 Winter Olympics in Vancouver the previous month, won the ski jumping test event on 14 March. Nordic combined has two test events that took place with the Norwegian team of Petter Tande, Mikko Kokslien, Jan Schmid and Magnus Moan winning the team event on the 13th while France's Jason Lamy Chappuis, gold medalist in the 10 km individual normal hill event at the 2010 Winter Olympics, won the 10 km individual large hill test event on the 14th. For the cross-country events held that weekend, Norway's Marit Bjørgen, who won five medals at the 2010 Winter Olympics, won both the sprint and the 30 km events. In the men's cross-country events, the sprint was won by Norwegian Anders Gløersen while the 50 km was won by Gløersen's fellow countryman Petter Northug.

On 15–16 April 2010, the 2011 Coordination Group met in Oslo after the broadcasters' meetings. Among items discussed were the organizational review from the World Cup held at the Holmenkollen the previous month along with that of success of the ski jump following its renovation. The city of Oslo itself was praised for its management of the World Cup event the previous month. Introduced to the organizing committee was John Aalberg as sports director after previously serving as Nordic director for the Winter Olympics at Whistler Olympic Park. Marketing plans are underway for the event in Norway in 2011. Final schedule was determined at the FIS Council meeting in June 2010.

=== 2011 ===
It was announced on 4 January 2011 that Maria Mittet would perform the official theme song "Glorious" for the FIS Nordic World Ski Championships 2011. A number of cultural events and outdoor concerts took place in Oslo from 23 February with the Opening Ceremony, and then a WC-show every day from 26 February to 5 March. The music group Polka Bjørn & Kleine Heine, scheduled to perform at every show, released an unofficial theme song called "I like to ski", featuring Norwegian trumpet virtuoso Ole Edvard Antonsen.

- Netherlands
- New Zealand
- Norway
- Portugal

== Medal table ==
=== Top nations ===
* Host nation (Norway)

Medal winners by nation
Rank	Nation	Gold	Silver	Bronze	Total
1	Norway (NOR)*	8	6	6	20
2	Austria (AUT)	7	2	1	10
3	Sweden (SWE)	2	2	1	5
4	Germany (GER)	1	4	3	8
5	Finland (FIN)	1	1	2	4
6	France (FRA)	1	0	1	2
7	Canada (CAN)^{[1]}	1	0	0	1
8	Poland (POL)	0	2	2	4
8	Russia (RUS)	0	2	2	4
10	Italy (ITA)	0	2	0	2
11	Slovenia (SLO)	0	0	2	2
12	Switzerland (SWI)	0	0	1	1
Totals (12 entries)		21	21	21	63

^[1] Canada won its first ever gold medal at a Nordic World Ski Championships.

=== Top athletes ===
All athletes with two or more medals.

Rank	Athlete	Gold	Silver	Bronze	Total
1	Marit Bjørgen (NOR)	4	1	0	5
2	Petter Northug (NOR)	3	2	0	5
3	Thomas Morgenstern (AUT)	3	1	0	4
4	Gregor Schlierenzauer (AUT)	3	0	0	3
5	Andreas Kofler (AUT)	2	1	0	3
6	Felix Gottwald (AUT)	2	0	1	3
6	Therese Johaug (NOR)	2	0	1	3
8	Eric Frenzel (GER)	1	2	1	4
9	Charlotte Kalla (SWE)	1	1	0	2
9	Ida Ingemarsdotter (SWE)	1	1	0	2
9	Marcus Hellner (SWE)	1	1	0	2
12	Johannes Rydzek (GER)	0	3	0	3
12	Tino Edelmann (GER)	0	3	0	3
14	Justyna Kowalczyk (POL)	0	2	1	3
15	Aino-Kaisa Saarinen (FIN)	0	1	2	3
16	Krista Lähteenmäki (FIN)	0	1	1	2
Totals (16 entries)		23	20	7	50

== See also ==
- 2011 IPC Biathlon and Cross-Country Skiing World Championships
