= FIS Ski Flying World Championships 2008 =

2008 edition of the FIS Ski-Flying World Championships

- Official logo for the FIS Ski Flying World Championships 2008.
- Host city: Oberstdorf, Germany
- Nations: 18
- Athletes: 62
- Events: 2
- Opening: 21 February
- Closing: 24 February
- Main venue: Heini-Klopfer-Skiflugschanze

The FIS Ski Flying World Ski Championships 2008 took place on 21–24 February 2008 in Oberstdorf, Germany for the record tying fifth time, matching that of Planica, Slovenia. Oberstdorf hosted the championships previously in 1973, 1981, 1988, and 1998. For the first time, both events were held in the evening. Finland's Janne Ahonen won his record seventh medal though none of them have been gold with five silvers and two bronzes.

== Individual ==
22–23 February 2008.

Medal	Athlete	Points
Gold	Gregor Schlierenzauer (AUT)	835.4
Silver	Martin Koch (AUT)	824.7
Bronze	Janne Ahonen (FIN)	811.9

Koch had the longest jump of the competition with a 221.0 m second round jump. Norway's Bjørn Einar Romøren led after the first two rounds, but had a poor third round jump to fall to third, allowing Koch to take the lead. Schlierenzauer, who had the second-best jump in each of the previous three rounds, had the longest jump in the final round to win the championships for the first time. Two-time defending champion Roar Ljøkelsøy of Norway finished 32nd after being eliminated in the first round.

== Team ==
24 February 2008.

Medal	Team	Points
Gold	Austria; Gregor Schlierenzauer; Andreas Kofler; Thomas Morgenstern; Martin Koch	1553.3
Silver	Finland; Janne Ahonen; Matti Hautamäki; Harri Olli; Janne Happonen	1477.0
Bronze	Norway; Anders Jacobsen; Tom Hilde; Anders Bardal; Bjørn Einar Romøren	1453.2

Schlierenzauer had the longest jump of the competition with his 217.0 m second round jump. Finland earned their third straight silver medal in this event.

== Medal table ==
Rank	Nation	Gold	Silver	Bronze	Total
1	Austria (AUT)	2	1	0	3
2	Finland (FIN)	0	1	1	2
3	Norway (NOR)	0	0	1	1
Totals (3 entries)		2	2	2	6
