= Fredrik Balkåsen =

Swedish ski jumper

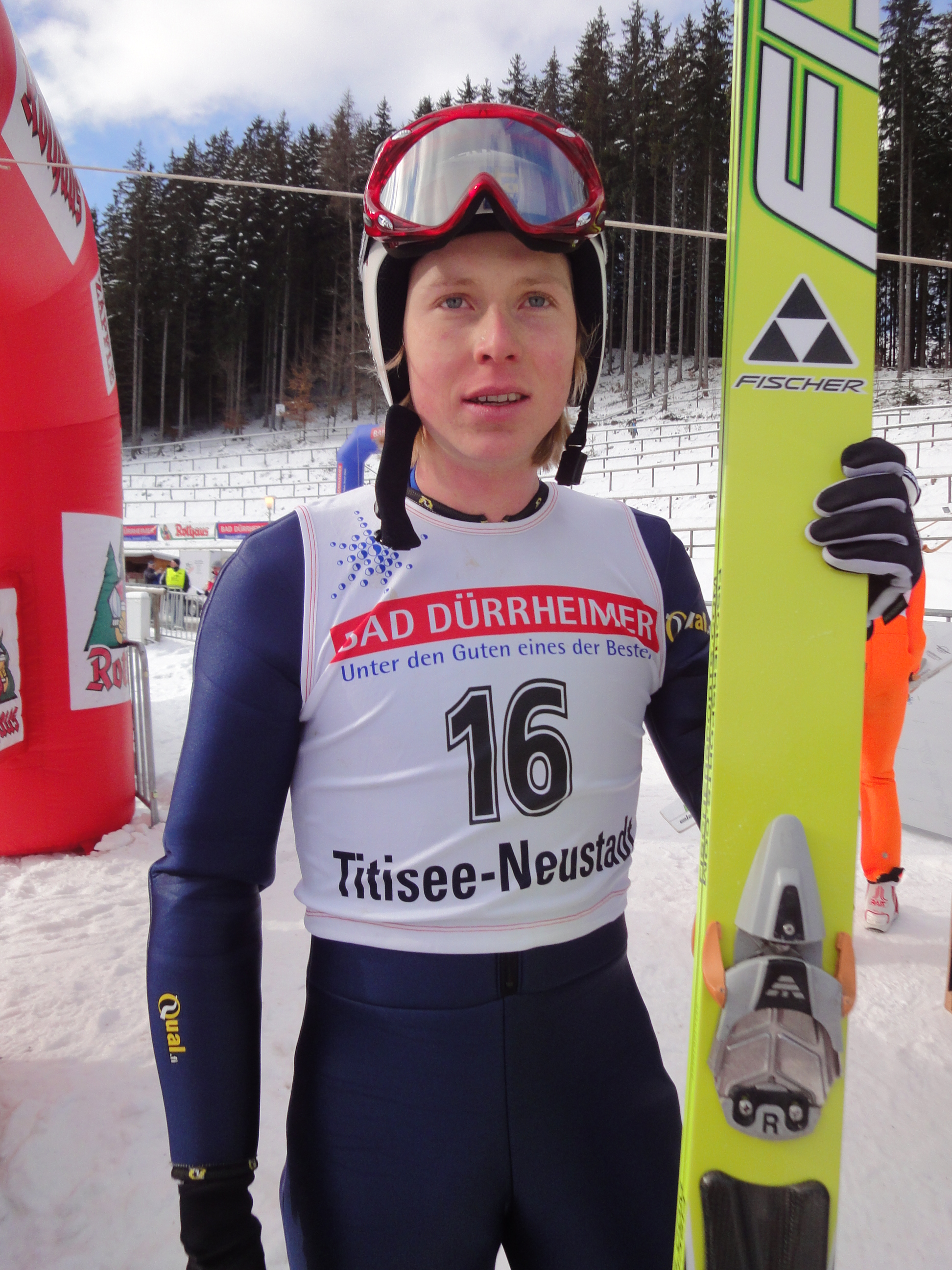

Personal information
- Born: 13 May 1989 (age 37)

Sport
- Sport: Skiing
- Club: Holmens IF

World Cup career
- Seasons: 2011-present
- Indiv. wins: 0
- Updated on 18 January 2010

Fredrik Balkåsen (born 13 May 1989) is a Swedish ski jumper.

He made his Continental Cup debut in March 2006 in Vikersund, and his best result is a ninth place from Iron Mountain in January 2010. He participated in the FIS Junior World Ski Championships in 2005, 2006, 2007 and 2009. He made his World Cup debut in January 2011 in Harrachov, finishing 37th, and collected his first World Cup points on the next day with a 30th place.
