= Johan Remen Evensen =

Norwegian ski jumper

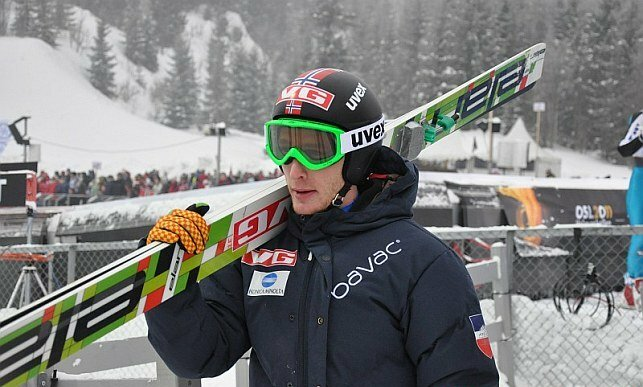
- Evensen in 2011

Personal information
- Nationality: Norway
- Born: 16 September 1985 (age 40) Øksnes Municipality, Norway
- Height: 1.79 m (5 ft 10 1/2 in)

Sport
- Sport: Skiing

World Cup career
- Seasons: 2009–2012
- Indiv. starts: 72
- Indiv. podiums: 6
- Indiv. wins: 1
- Team starts: 12
- Team wins: 1

Achievements and titles
- Personal bests: 246.5 m (809 ft); Vikersund, 11 February 2011
Medal record
Men's ski jumping
Olympic Games
Bronze medal – third place	2010 Vancouver	Team LH
FIS Nordic World Ski Championships
Silver medal – second place	2009 Liberec	Team LH
Silver medal – second place	2011 Oslo	Team LH
Men's ski flying
FIS Ski Flying World Championships
Silver medal – second place	2010 Planica	Team
- Updated on 10 February 2016

Johan Remen Evensen (born 16 September 1985) is a Norwegian former ski jumper. He is a two-time world record holder in ski flying, achieving his peak distance of 246.5 metres (809 ft) in 2011.

A late bloomer, Evensen made his World Cup debut during the 2008/09 season at age 23, and earned a place in the Norwegian World Cup team following consecutive top 12 finishes at Granåsen. On 14 December 2008, Evensen finished on the podium for the first time in his career, when he finished third in the World Cup event at Pragelato. On 11 February 2011, Evensen made the world's longest ski jump with 246.5 meters in the ski flying qualification round in Vikersund, Norway. The following day he won his first world cup competition in the main event. he announced his retirement from the sport just prior to the 2012 Ski Flying World Championships.

== Early life and career ==
Evensen was born in Alsvåg, but his family moved from Sørvågen to Molde, his mother's hometown, when Johan was seven years old. He has four brothers. He took up ski jumping in the sports club Molde og Omegn IF at the age of seven, his father Arnor Evensen being a supportive figure. Johan Remen Evensen attended secondary school at Heimdal, being affiliated with the regional ski jumping team Trønderhopp. He later moved to Oslo, leaving Trønderhopp to join Eastern Norway's Kollenhopp.

At the Norwegian Championships held in Holmenkollen in January 2006, Remen Evensen finished seventeenth in the large hill.

In January 2007 he was used as a test jumper in the ski flying hill Vikersundbakken. He described this as "fantastically fun", and added that the success of Anders Jacobsen inspired him. By February 2007, he had displayed consistently good results in the Norwegian Tournament. He then performed well in the 2007 national championships. For this, he was sent to Japan to compete in the FIS Cup, the third highest level of international ski jumping. Competing three times, twice in Zao and once in Sapporo, Evensen recorded two victories and one second place. He followed up with a second place in his first Continental Cup event, in Zakopane two weeks later. He was drafted to the Norwegian squad for the World Cup event in Planica, but here he fell through in the qualification round. At this time his short-term goal (his long-term goal being to become "the world's best ski jumper") was to make the Norwegian national ski jumping team. In May the same year his inclusion in the national B team was announced. He landed a number of sponsor deals in order to concentrate fully on his training.

In the 2007/08 season, Evensen continued his Continental Cup career in January, with three competitions in Sapporo. His best result was a fourth place. At his next international competition, the Continental Cup in Trondheim in March, he finished ninth and tenth in the two races. This season he achieved a personal best jump of 212 metres as a test jumper in Planica. He was also a test jumper at the FIS Ski Flying World Championships 2008.

Just four days ahead of the FIS Ski Flying World Championships 2012 at Vikersund in Norway Johan Remen Evensen announced that he would retire from ski jumping effective immediately. Since he had not been selected to represent Norway in the forthcoming world championship some people speculated a connection between this and his decision to quit. At a press conference he explained however that the reason for his quitting was a persistent problem keeping his weight down. He explained that he had been gaining weight without being able to account for it, and he concluded, "I have a body that doesn't function, and that means it's time to quit."

== World Cup ==
Ahead of the 2008 season, his place on the national B team was reaffirmed. He achieved mediocre results during the autumn 2008 Continental Cup run, but his performances in the Norwegian Tournament secured him a place on the team for the 2008–09 World Cup opener in Trondheim. In Trondheim Evensen achieved a tenth place in the first race, and followed up with a twelfth place the next day. He was noted as a surprise achiever by the national media. Evensen himself described the competition as a "dream" and "completely insane".

A week later in Pragelato, Evensen achieved a seventh place. Being the highest-placed Norwegian in the race, he described the experience as "unreal". The next day, he was third after the first round, but as the second round was cancelled due to weather conditions, Evensen took his first World Cup podium. The podium was followed by several low rankings, however, on February 14, he again showed his potential by placing third behind Harri Olli and Anders Jacobsen in the Heini-Klopfer-Skiflugschanze in Oberstdorf, where he not only improved his own personal record to 223.5 m, but also jumped 0.5m longer than the previous hill record set by Roar Ljøkelsøy in 2004. His record was not acknowledged because Harri Olli had already landed on 225.5 m in the first round. At the FIS Nordic World Ski Championships 2009 in Liberec, Evensen won a silver in the team large hill event.

=== Standings ===
Season	Overall	4H	SF	NT
2008/09	20	24	11	23
2009/10	18	16	7	43
2010/11	11	19	6	N/A
2011/12	40	48	22	N/A

=== Wins ===
No.	Season	Date	Location	Hill	Size
1	2010/11	12 February 2011	(Norway) Vikersund	Vikersundbakken HS225 (night)	FH

== Ski jumping world records ==
Date	Hill	Location	Metres	Feet
11 February 2011	Vikersundbakken HS225	Vikersund, Norway	243	797
11 February 2011	Vikersundbakken HS225	Vikersund, Norway	246.5	809

== Personal life ==
Evensen married at the age of 22. He is an outspoken Christian, sponsored by the newspaper Vårt Land among others. He is also a member of the Christian sports organization Kristen Idrettskontakt (KRIK).

Records
Preceded by Bjørn Einar Romøren; 239 m (784 ft)	World's longest ski jump 246.5 m (809 ft); 11 February 2011 – 14 February 2015	Succeeded by Peter Prevc; 250 m (820 ft)
