= Thomas Morgenstern =

Austrian ski jumper (born 1986)

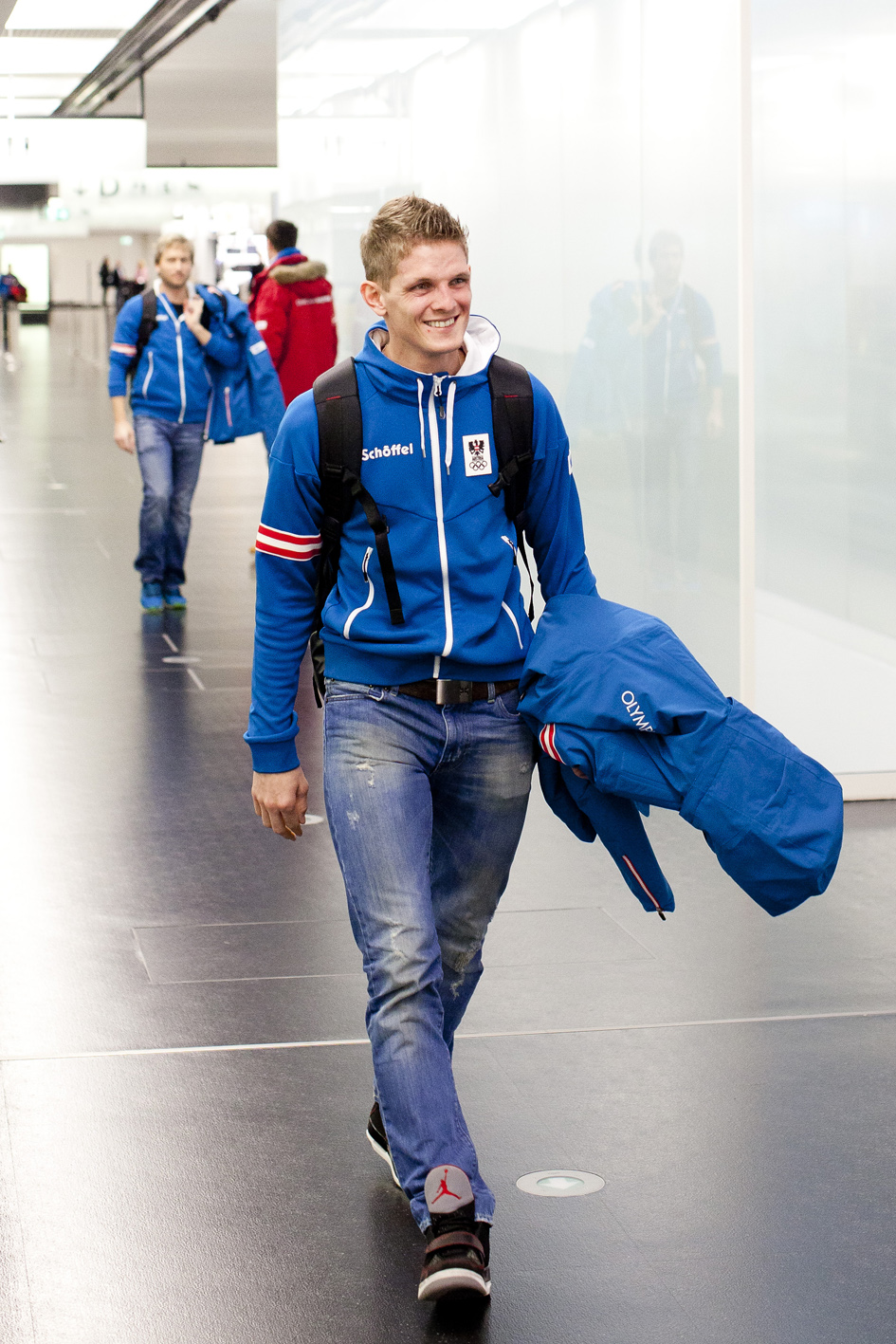
- Morgenstern in 2014

Personal information
- Nationality: Austria
- Born: 30 October 1986 (age 39) Spittal an der Drau, Austria
- Height: 1.84 m (6 ft 0 in)

Sport
- Sport: Skiing

World Cup career
- Seasons: 2003–2014
- Indiv. starts: 245
- Indiv. podiums: 76
- Indiv. wins: 23
- Team starts: 31
- Team podiums: 31
- Team wins: 16
- Overall titles: 2 (2008, 2011)
- Four Hills titles: 1 (2011)
- Nordic titles: 1 (2006)

Achievements and titles
- Personal bests: 232 m (761 ft); Planica, 19 March 2011
Medal record
Men's ski jumping
Event	1st	2nd	3rd
Olympic Games	3	1	0
World Championships	8	2	1
Ski Flying World Championships	3	0	2
Total	14	3	3
Olympic Games
Gold medal – first place	2006 Turin	Individual LH
Gold medal – first place	2006 Turin	Team LH
Gold medal – first place	2010 Vancouver	Team LH
Silver medal – second place	2014 Sochi	Team LH
World Championships
Gold medal – first place	2005 Oberstdorf	Team NH
Gold medal – first place	2005 Oberstdorf	Team LH
Gold medal – first place	2007 Sapporo	Team LH
Gold medal – first place	2009 Liberec	Team LH
Gold medal – first place	2011 Oslo	Individual NH
Gold medal – first place	2011 Oslo	Team NH
Gold medal – first place	2011 Oslo	Team LH
Gold medal – first place	2013 Val di Fiemme	Team LH
Silver medal – second place	2011 Oslo	Individual LH
Silver medal – second place	2013 Val di Fiemme	Mixed team NH
Bronze medal – third place	2007 Sapporo	Individual NH
Men's ski flying
World Championships
Gold medal – first place	2008 Oberstdorf	Team
Gold medal – first place	2010 Planica	Team
Gold medal – first place	2012 Vikersund	Team
Bronze medal – third place	2004 Planica	Team
Bronze medal – third place	2006 Bad Mitterndorf	Individual
- Updated on 10 February 2016

Thomas Morgenstern (born 30 October 1986) is an Austrian former ski jumper who competed from 2002 to 2014. He is one of the most successful ski jumpers of all time, having won the World Cup overall title twice with 23 individual wins, the Four Hills Tournament and the Nordic Tournament once each, eight World Championship gold medals (one individual, seven team), and three Winter Olympic gold medals (one individual, two team).

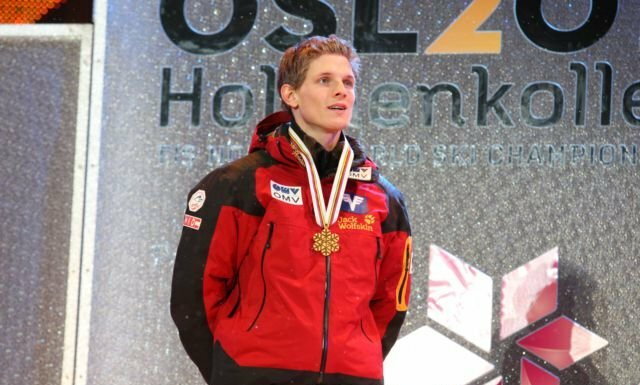
After winning gold medal individually in Oslo 2011.

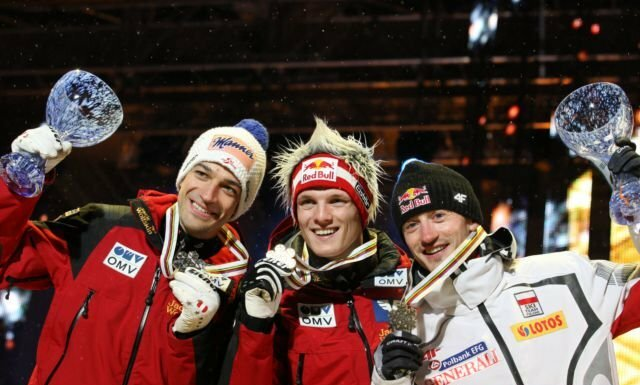
Andreas Kofler, Thomas Morgenstern, Adam Małysz in Oslo 2011 – medal ceremony (men individual, normal hill)

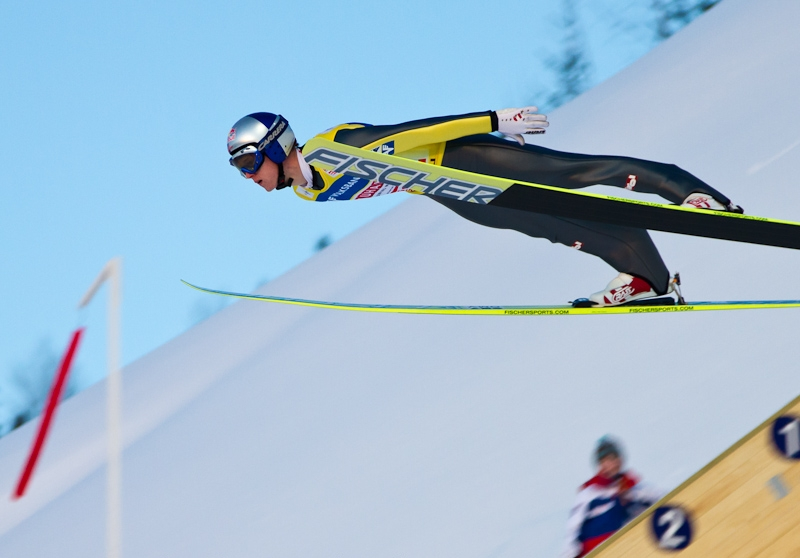
Ski flying world cup in Vikersund 2011

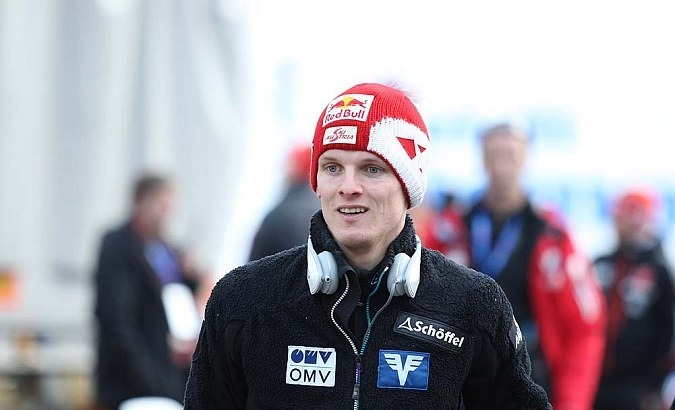
During the team competition on 2 March 2013.

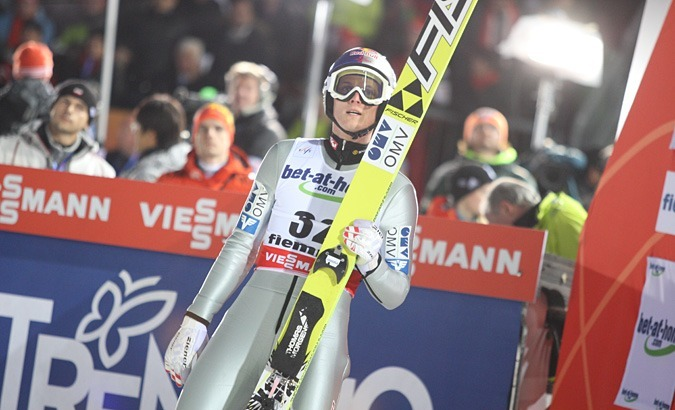
Individual competition on World Championship 2013 in Val di Fiemme on large hill.

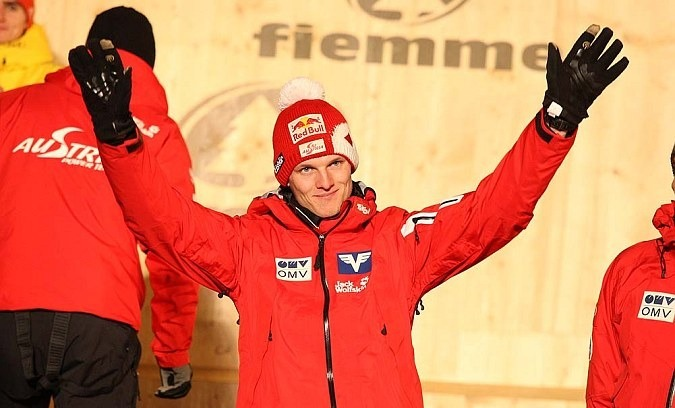
Medal ceremony at World Championship 2013 in Val di Fiemme (team competition).

== Career ==
Morgenstern began his ski jumping career in the Continental Cup, winning three events out of four attempts. He made his senior level World Cup debut at the 2002–03 Four Hills Tournament, where he finished 9th in Oberstdorf, 25th in Garmisch-Partenkirchen, 9th in Innsbruck and 6th in Bischofshofen; this placed him 10th overall in the final tournament standings. Five days after the end of the tournament, he won his first World Cup event in Liberec. In the following summer, he won the Ski jumping Grand Prix for the first time.

At the start of the 2003–04 season, Morgenstern suffered a violent accident in Kuusamo, in which he was hit by a gust of wind just after takeoff, forcing him to flip over in mid-air and land hard on his back. He only sustained minor injuries, and managed to recover quickly to continue his success. He was second overall to Sigurd Pettersen during most of that season's Four Hills tournament, finally ending up in fourth place. He won his first team medal with a 3rd place at the Ski-Flying World Championships.

In the next season, Morgenstern won gold medals in both team events (normal hill and large hill) at the Nordic World Ski Championships.

During the 2006 Winter Olympics, he won the gold medals in the individual and team large hill competitions. Further, he won the bronze medal in the single event at the Ski-Flying World Championships in Bad Mitterndorf. By ending up as 5th, Morgenstern achieved his best ranking in the world cup so far.

In the 2006–07 season, he won the large hill team event at the Nordic World Ski Championships. Further, by reaching the 3rd place in the normal hill event he won his first individual medal at world championships. As in 2003, Morgenstern won the Ski jumping Grand Prix.

At the beginning of the 2007–08 season, he won the first six competitions, which is an all-time record. With these six wins he also tied the record for most wins in a row, previously set by Janne Ahonen, Matti Hautamäki and Gregor Schlierenzauer. In early 2008, Morgenstern won a gold medal at the Ski-Flying World Championships in Oberstdorf. Morgenstern won the world cup for the first time, 233 points ahead of Gregor Schlierenzauer.

During the 2008–09 season, Morgenstern could not win any competition, but won a team gold medal at the Nordic World Ski Championships in Liberec.

The 2009–10 world cup again was very modest with only two victories. However, Morgenstern won gold medals in the team events at the Ski-Flying World Championships and the 2010 Winter Olympics.

The season 2010–11 again started very successful by winning four of the first six competitions. Morgenstern further won the Four Hills Tournament for the first time in this season. In January 2011, he won his first ski flying event in Harrachov, and fixed his second victory of the ski jumping world cup with a 5th place at the ski flying competition in Vikersund on 13 February. At the 2011 FIS Nordic World Ski Championships in Oslo he won gold on the normal hill. It was his first gold medal in an individual event at world championships. In the following he further won gold medals in the team events (normal hill and large hill), both times together with Andreas Kofler, Martin Koch and Gregor Schlierenzauer, as well as the silver medal in the individual large-hill event.

On 10 January 2014, Morgenstern suffered serious head injuries during training for the ski flying event in Bad Mitterndorf. He recovered in time to take part in the 2014 Winter Olympics in Sochi, where he placed 14th in the normal hill and 40th in the large hill men's individual ski jumping events.

On 26 September 2014, Morgenstern announced his retirement from competitive ski jumping. His last jump in competitive ski jumping was when he won the silver medal with the Austrian team at the 2014 Winter Olympics in Sochi.

== World Cup ==
=== Standings ===
Season	Overall	4H	SF	NT
2002/03	20	10	N/A	9
2003/04	6	4	N/A	9
2004/05	7	3rd place, bronze medalist(s)	N/A	8
2005/06	5	20	N/A	1st place, gold medalist(s)
2006/07	6	4	N/A	17
2007/08	1st place, gold medalist(s)	2nd place, silver medalist(s)	N/A	6
2008/09	7	8	18	8
2009/10	3rd place, bronze medalist(s)	6	18	3rd place, bronze medalist(s)
2010/11	1st place, gold medalist(s)	1st place, gold medalist(s)	3rd place, bronze medalist(s)	N/A
2011/12	7	2nd place, silver medalist(s)	7	N/A
2012/13	25	16	—	N/A
2013/14	15	2nd place, silver medalist(s)	—	N/A

=== Wins ===
No.	Season	Date	Location	Hill	Size
1	2002/03	11 January 2003	(Czech Republic) Liberec	Ještěd A K120 (night)	LH
2	2005/06	10 March 2006	(Norway) Lillehammer	Lysgårdsbakken HS134 (night)	LH
3	2007/08	1 December 2007	(Finland) Kuusamo	Rukatunturi HS142 (night)	LH
4	2007/08	8 December 2007	(Norway) Trondheim	Granåsen HS131 (night)	LH
5	2007/08	9 December 2007	(Norway) Trondheim	Granåsen HS131	LH
6	2007/08	13 December 2007	(Austria) Villach	Villacher Alpenarena HS98	NH
7	2007/08	14 December 2007	(Austria) Villach	Villacher Alpenarena HS98 (night)	NH
8	2007/08	22 December 2007	(Switzerland) Engelberg	Gross-Titlis-Schanze HS137	LH
9	2007/08	30 December 2007	(Germany) Oberstdorf	Schattenbergschanze HS137 (night)	LH
10	2007/08	2 February 2008	(Japan) Sapporo	Ōkurayama HS134 (night)	LH
11	2007/08	3 February 2008	(Japan) Sapporo	Ōkurayama HS134	LH
12	2007/08	8 February 2008	(Czech Republic) Liberec	Ještěd A HS134 (night)	LH
13	2009/10	6 January 2010	(Austria) Bischofshofen	Paul-Ausserleitner-Schanze HS140 (night)	LH
14	2009/10	16 January 2010	(Japan) Sapporo	Ōkurayama HS134 (night)	LH
15	2010/11	4 December 2010	(Norway) Lillehammer	Lysgårdsbakken HS138 (night)	LH
16	2010/11	5 December 2010	(Norway) Lillehammer	Lysgårdsbakken HS138	LH
17	2010/11	17 December 2010	(Switzerland) Engelberg	Gross-Titlis-Schanze HS137	LH
18	2010/11	18 December 2010	(Switzerland) Engelberg	Gross-Titlis-Schanze HS137	LH
19	2010/11	30 December 2010	(Germany) Oberstdorf	Schattenbergschanze HS137 (night)	LH
20	2010/11	4 January 2011	(Austria) Innsbruck	Bergiselschanze HS130	LH
21	2010/11	9 January 2011	(Czech Republic) Harrachov	Čerťák HS205	FH
22	2011/12	6 January 2012	(Austria) Bischofshofen	Paul-Ausserleitner-Schanze HS140 (night)	LH
23	2013/14	14 December 2013	(Germany) Titisee-Neustadt	Hochfirstschanze HS142	LH

== Honours ==
- Gold Merit Badge of Austria: 2004
- Grand Decoration of Austria: 2006
- Austrian Sportspersonality of the year: 2008, 2011
- Part of the Austrian Sportsteam of the year, together with the Austrian ski jumping team: 2005, 2008, 2009, 2011
- Carinthian Sportspersonality of the year: 4 times, including 2008, 2010

== Personal life ==
In 2013 he left his girlfriend of 10 years and went on vacation to Hawaii with his new girlfriend, a physiotherapist. He has a daughter named Lily (born 26 December 2012) with his ex-fiancée and twins named Sara and Tina (born 2021) with his current partner Sabrina.
