= Tom Hilde =

Norwegian ski jumper

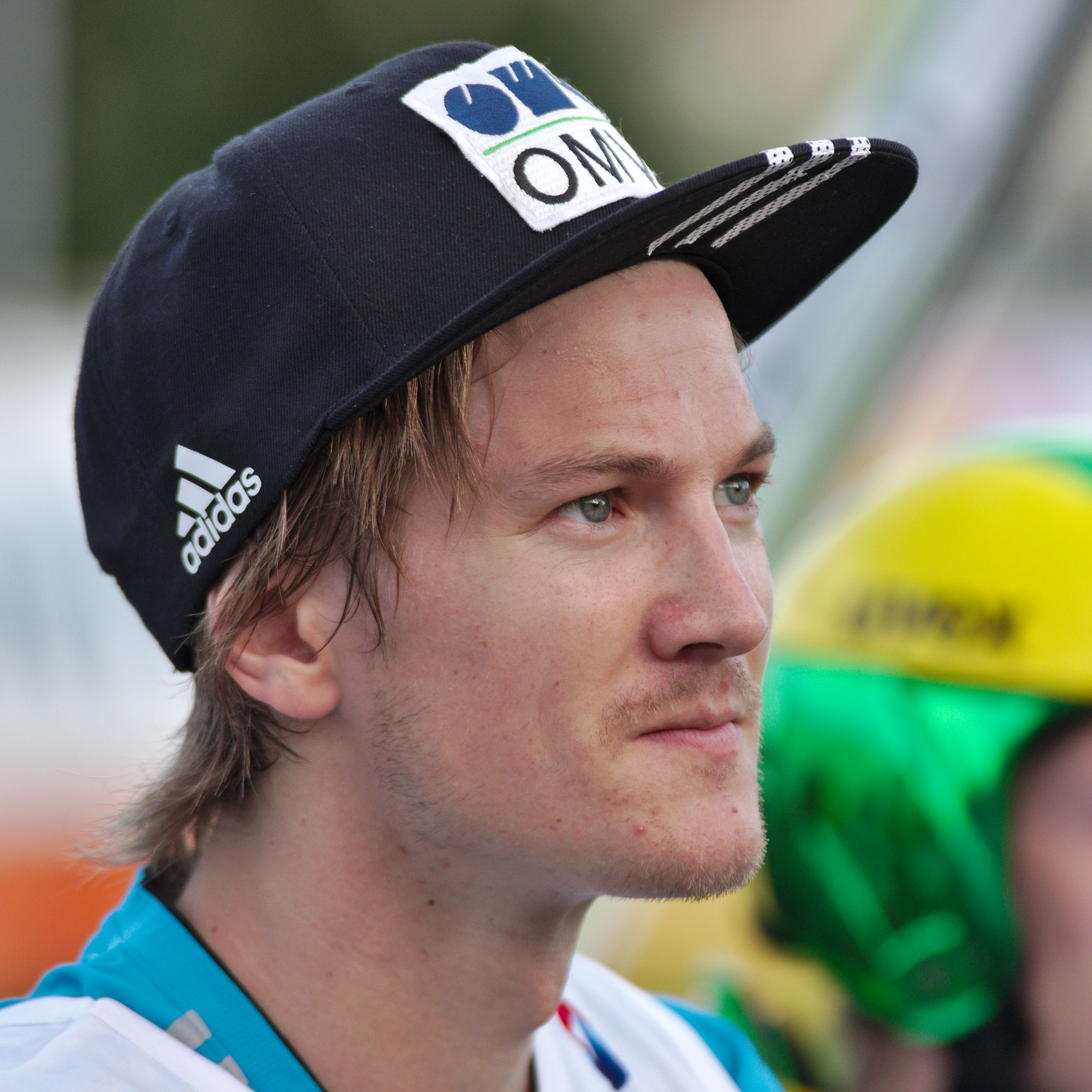

Personal information
- Full name: Tom André Hilde
- Nationality: Norway
- Born: 22 September 1987 (age 38) Asker, Norway
- Height: 1.79 m (5 ft 10 1/2 in)

Sport
- Sport: Skiing
- Club: Asker Skiklubb

World Cup career
- Seasons: 2006–2018
- Indiv. starts: 205
- Indiv. podiums: 15
- Indiv. wins: 3
- Team starts: 30
- Team podiums: 22
- Team wins: 8

Achievements and titles
- Personal bests: 223.5 m (733 ft); Vikersund, 11 February 2011
Medal record
Men's ski jumping
Olympic Games
| Bronze medal – third place | 2010 Vancouver | Team LH |
FIS Nordic World Ski Championships
| Silver medal – second place | 2007 Sapporo | Team LH |
| Silver medal – second place | 2009 Liberec | Team LH |
| Silver medal – second place | 2011 Oslo | Team NH |
| Silver medal – second place | 2011 Oslo | Team LH |
FIS Ski Flying World Championships
| Bronze medal – third place | 2008 Oberstdorf | Team |
- Updated on 25 March 2018

Tom André Hilde (Norwegian pronunciation: [ˈtɔm ˈhɪ̀ldə]; born 22 September 1987) is a Norwegian former ski jumper.

== Career ==
Having first competed with the Norwegian World Cup team in 2006, he won two silver medals in the team large hill event at the FIS Nordic World Ski Championships (2007, 2009).

Hilde also won a bronze medal in the team event at the FIS Ski Flying World Championships 2008 in Oberstdorf. Hilde currently holds five World Cup victories in all events since 2007. His best overall world cup result is a fourth place in the 2007/2008 season. Hilde currently lives in Lillehammer, Norway.

== World Cup ==
=== Standings ===
| Season | Overall | 4H | SF | RA | W5 | P7 | NT |
|---|---|---|---|---|---|---|---|
| 2005/06 | 62 | — | N/A | N/A | N/A | N/A | 48 |
| 2006/07 | 20 | 25 | N/A | N/A | N/A | N/A | 10 |
| 2007/08 | 4 | 14 | N/A | N/A | N/A | N/A | 2nd place, silver medalist(s) |
| 2008/09 | 24 | 32 | 15 | N/A | N/A | N/A | 31 |
| 2009/10 | 26 | 43 | 20 | N/A | N/A | N/A | 20 |
| 2010/11 | 5 | 3rd place, bronze medalist(s) | 7 | N/A | N/A | N/A | N/A |
| 2011/12 | 29 | 50 | 30 | N/A | N/A | N/A | N/A |
| 2012/13 | 11 | 3rd place, bronze medalist(s) | 23 | N/A | N/A | N/A | N/A |
| 2013/14 | 48 | 41 | — | N/A | N/A | N/A | N/A |
| 2014/15 | 39 | — | 37 | N/A | N/A | N/A | N/A |
| 2015/16 | 37 | 40 | — | N/A | N/A | N/A | N/A |
| 2016/17 | 56 | 49 | — | 69 | N/A | N/A | N/A |
| 2017/18 | — | — | — | 53 | 41 | — | N/A |

=== Wins ===
| No. | Season | Date | Location | Hill | Size |
|---|---|---|---|---|---|
| 1 | 2007/08 | 12 January 2008 | (Italy) Val di Fiemme | Trampolino dal Ben HS134 (night) | LH |
| 2 | 2007/08 | 13 January 2008 | (Italy) Val di Fiemme | Trampolino dal Ben HS134 | LH |
| 3 | 2010/11 | 6 January 2011 | (Austria) Bischofshofen | Paul-Ausserleitner-Schanze HS140 (night) | LH |
