= Michael Neumayer =

German ski jumper (born 1979)

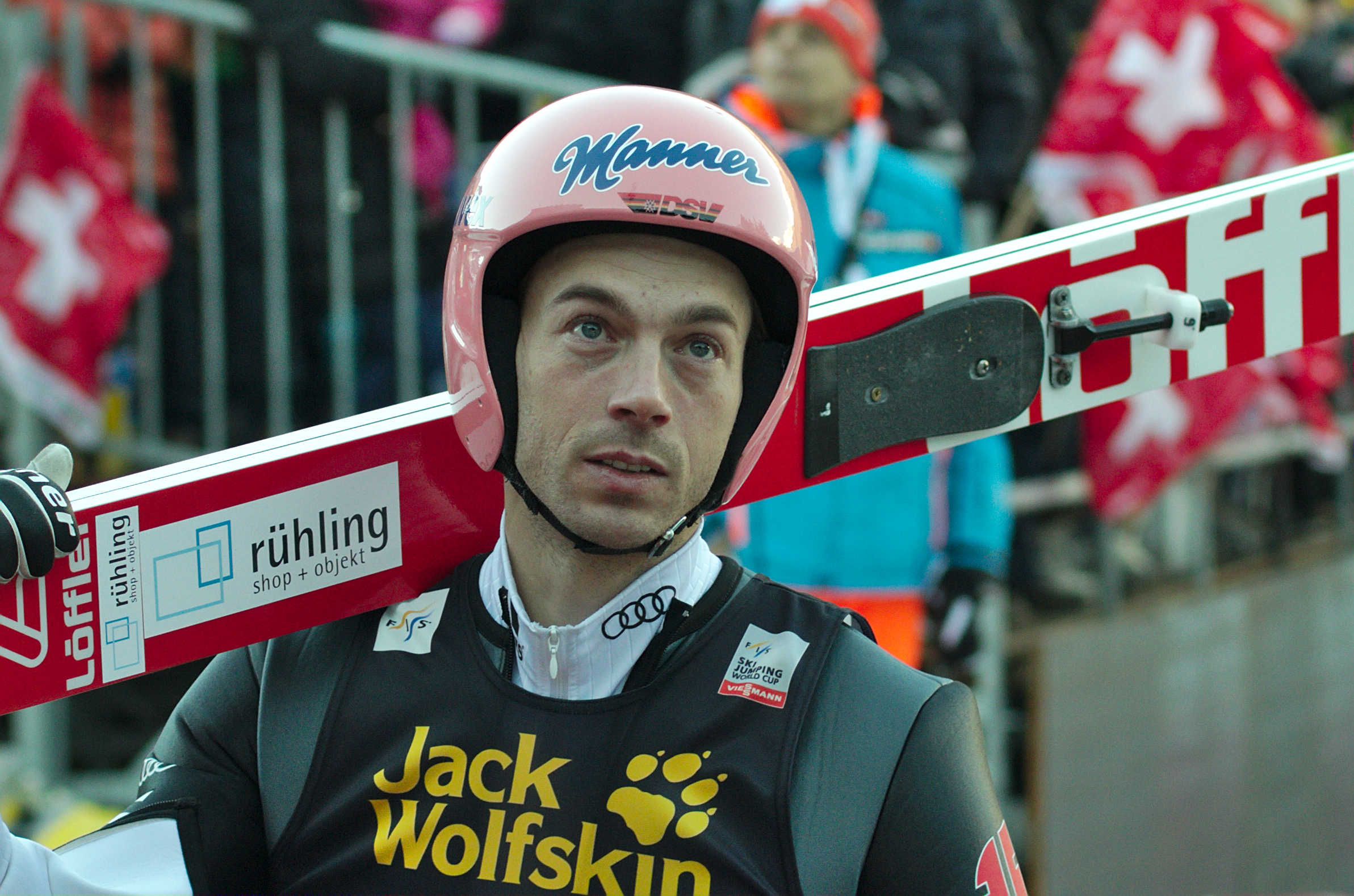
- Neumayer in Engelberg, 2014

Personal information
- Nationality: Germany
- Born: 15 January 1979 (age 47) Bad Reichenhall, West Germany
- Height: 1.80 m (5 ft 11 in)

Sport
- Sport: Skiing

World Cup career
- Seasons: 2001–2015
- Indiv. podiums: 3
- Team podiums: 10
- Team wins: 4

Achievements and titles
- Personal bests: 231 m (758 ft); Vikersund, 27 January 2013
Medal record
Men's ski jumping
Olympic Games
Silver medal – second place	2010 Vancouver	Team large hill
World Championships
Silver medal – second place	2005 Oberstdorf	Team normal hill
Silver medal – second place	2013 Val di Fiemme	Team large hill
Bronze medal – third place	2011 Oslo	Team normal hill
Men's ski flying
World Championships
Bronze medal – third place	2006 Bad Mitterndorf	Team
- Updated on 21 March 2016

Michael Neumayer (born 15 January 1979) is a German former ski jumper who competed from 2000 to 2015. He won a silver medal in the team normal hill at the 2005 FIS Nordic World Ski Championships in Oberstdorf and finished 32nd in the individual normal hill at those same championships.

Neumayer also won a bronze in the team event at the FIS Ski-Flying World Championships 2006. His best individual finish at the Winter Olympics was 8th in the individual normal hill at Turin in 2006.

Neumayer has five individual career victories from 2002 to 2008 (albeit none of them in an individual World Cup competition). He is an employee at a tax consultancy firm away from his ski jumping duties.

== World Cup victories ==
Team

Nr.	Date	Location	Hill
1.	7 February 2010	(Germany) Willingen	Large hill
2.	30 November 2012	(Finland) Kuusamo	Large hill
3.	9 March 2013	(Finland) Lahti	Large hill
