= Michael Uhrmann =

German ski jumper (born 1978)

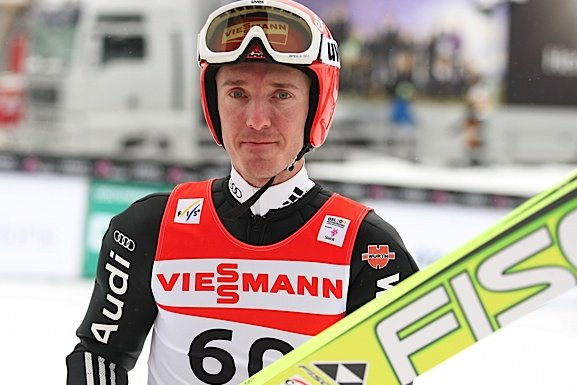
- Uhrmann in Oslo, 2011

Personal information
- Nationality: Germany
- Born: 16 September 1978 (age 47) Wegscheid, West Germany
- Height: 1.81 m (5 ft 11 1/2 in)

Sport
- Sport: Skiing

World Cup career
- Seasons: 1995–2011
- Indiv. starts: 273
- Indiv. podiums: 14
- Indiv. wins: 2
- Team starts: 31
- Team podiums: 17
- Team wins: 3

Achievements and titles
- Personal bests: 226 m (741 ft); Planica, 20 March 2005
Medal record
Men's ski jumping
Olympic Games
Gold medal – first place	2002 Salt Lake City	Team LH
Silver medal – second place	2010 Vancouver	Team LH
FIS Nordic World Ski Championships
Gold medal – first place	2001 Lahti	Team LH
Silver medal – second place	2005 Oberstdorf	Team NH
Bronze medal – third place	2001 Lahti	Team NH
Bronze medal – third place	2011 Oslo	Team NH
- Updated on 10 February 2016

Michael "Michi" Uhrmann (born 16 September 1978) is a German former ski jumper who competed from 1994 to 2011.

== Career ==
He competed in two Winter Olympics, winning a gold medal in the team large hill event at Salt Lake City in 2002, and a silver medal in the team large hill at Vancouver in 2010.

Uhrmann also won four medals at the FIS Nordic World Ski Championships, with a gold in 2001 (team large hill), a silver in 2005 (team normal hill), and a bronze in 2001 and 2011 (team normal hill). He also won a bronze in the team event at the FIS Ski-Flying World Championships 2006. He currently holds the hill record at Klingenthal, with a jump of 146.5 m set on 2 February 2011.

== World Cup ==
=== Standings ===
Season	Overall	4H	SF	NT	JP
1994/95	—	68	—	N/A	N/A
1995/96	50	31	—	N/A	45
1996/97	—	64	—	—	—
1997/98	—	58	—	—	—
1998/99	—	—	—	—	—
1999/00	18	24	—	22	18
2000/01	22	27	30	17	N/A
2001/02	28	22	N/A	18	N/A
2002/03	15	18	N/A	8	N/A
2003/04	14	7	N/A	23	N/A
2004/05	9	8	N/A	3rd place, bronze medalist(s)	N/A
2005/06	8	11	N/A	10	N/A
2006/07	10	9	N/A	—	N/A
2007/08	27	46	N/A	15	N/A
2008/09	18	12	28	25	N/A
2009/10	12	28	11	24	N/A
2010/11	21	11	30	N/A	N/A

=== Wins ===
No.	Season	Date	Location	Hill	Size
1	2003/04	17 January 2004	(Poland) Zakopane	Wielka Krokiew K120 (night)	LH
2	2006/07	28 January 2007	(Germany) Oberstdorf	Schattenbergschanze HS137	LH
