= Martin Koch (ski jumper) =

Austrian ski jumper (born 1982)

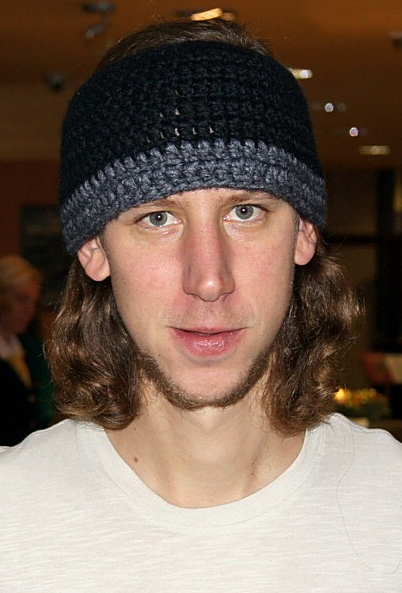
- Koch in 2011

Personal information
- Nationality: Austria
- Born: 22 January 1982 (age 44) Villach, Austria
- Height: 186 cm (6 ft 1 in)

Sport
- Sport: Skiing

World Cup career
- Seasons: 1999–2014
- Indiv. starts: 271
- Indiv. podiums: 23
- Indiv. wins: 5
- Team starts: 28
- Team podiums: 25
- Team wins: 11

Achievements and titles
- Personal bests: 241.5 m (792 ft); Vikersund, 11 February 2011
Medal record
Men's ski jumping
Olympic Games
Gold medal – first place	2006 Turin	Team LH
FIS Nordic World Ski Championships
Gold medal – first place	2009 Liberec	Team LH
Gold medal – first place	2011 Oslo	Team NH
Gold medal – first place	2011 Oslo	Team LH
Men's ski flying
FIS Ski Flying World Championships
Gold medal – first place	2008 Oberstdorf	Team
Gold medal – first place	2010 Planica	Team
Gold medal – first place	2012 Vikersund	Team
Silver medal – second place	2008 Oberstdorf	Individual
Bronze medal – third place	2012 Vikersund	Individual
- Updated on 17 January 2016

Martin Koch (born 22 January 1982) is an Austrian former ski jumper.

== Career ==
Koch started his World Cup career in 1999 and finished in the top 3 in all ski jumping events eighteen times. This included two victories with the first being on 8 January 2011 in Harrachov. He also won a silver medal at the 2008 Ski Flying World Championships and six gold medals in team events at the 2006 Winter Olympics and World Championships. He made his last World Cup jump on 22 March 2014 on the large hill in Planica.

Regarded as a ski flying specialist, Koch held the Austrian national distance record with a jump of 241.5 metres in Vikersund in 2011, until this was beaten by countryman Gregor Schlierenzauer in the same event.

Koch is the nephew of Armin Kogler.

== World Cup ==
=== Standings ===
Season	Overall	4H	SF	NT	JP
1998/99	99	58	—	—	96
1999/00	49	28	—	—	49
2000/01	36	32	28	29	N/A
2001/02	8	20	N/A	22	N/A
2002/03	34	36	N/A	—	N/A
2003/04	—	—	N/A	43	N/A
2004/05	48	59	N/A	48	N/A
2005/06	15	17	N/A	9	N/A
2006/07	12	11	N/A	16	N/A
2007/08	14	20	N/A	10	N/A
2008/09	9	11	4	9	N/A
2009/10	8	8	4	14	N/A
2010/11	6	5	2nd place, silver medalist(s)	N/A	N/A
2011/12	12	17	2nd place, silver medalist(s)	N/A	N/A
2012/13	29	32	15	N/A	N/A
2013/14	72	—	22	N/A	N/A

=== Wins ===
No.	Season	Date	Location	Hill	Size
1	2010/11	8 January 2011	(Czech Republic) Harrachov	Čerťák HS205 (night)	FH
2	2010/11	5 February 2011	(Germany) Oberstdorf	Heini-Klopfer-Skiflugschanze HS213 (night)	FH
3	2011/12	18 February 2012	(Germany) Oberstdorf	Heini-Klopfer-Skiflugschanze HS213 (night)	FH
4	2011/12	11 March 2012	(Norway) Oslo	Holmenkollbakken HS134	LH
5	2011/12	18 March 2012	(Slovenia) Planica	Letalnica bratov Gorišek HS215	FH
