= 2003–04 Four Hills Tournament =

Ski jumping competition

Four Hills Tournament at the 2003-04 FIS Ski Jumping World Cup
- Venues: Schattenbergschanze, Große Olympiaschanze, Bergiselschanze, Paul-Ausserleitner-Schanze
- Location: Germany, Austria
- Dates: 28 December 2003 – 6 January 2004
- Competitors: 84 from 21 nations

Medalists
gold medal	(Norway) Sigurd Pettersen
silver medal	(Austria) Martin Höllwarth
bronze medal	(Slovenia) Peter Žonta

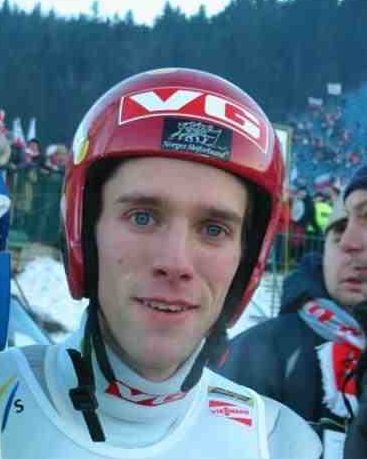
Tournament winner Sigurd Pettersen won six World Cup events during his career - all of them within one month, and three of them during the Four Hills.

The 52nd edition of the annual Four Hills Tournament was held in the traditional venues: Oberstorf and Garmisch-Partenkirchen in Germany, and Innsbruck and Bischofshofen in Austria.

== Format ==
At each of the four events, a qualification round was held. The 50 best jumpers qualified for the competition. The fifteen athletes leading the World Cup at the time qualified automatically. In case of an omitted qualification or a result that would normally result in elimination, they would instead qualify as 50th.

Unlike the procedure at normal World Cup events, the 50 qualified athletes were paired up for the first round of the final event, with the winner proceeding to the second round. The rounds start with the duel between #26 and #25 from the qualification round, followed by #27 vs #24, up to #50 vs #1. The five best duel losers, so-called 'Lucky Losers' also proceed.

For the tournament ranking, the total points earned from each jump are added together. The World Cup points collected during the four events are disregarded in this ranking.

== Pre-Tournament World Cup Standings ==
At the time of the tournament, eight out of twenty-eight events were supposed to be completed, but three were cancelled.

The standings were as follows:

Rank	Name	Points
1.	(Norway) Roar Ljøkelsøy	288
2.	(Finland) Janne Ahonen	268
3.	(Poland) Adam Małysz	240
4.	(Norway) Sigurd Pettersen	206
5.	(Finland) Tami Kiuru	176
5.	(Finland) Veli-Matti Lindström	176
7.	(Germany) Sven Hannawald	172
8.	(Finland) Matti Hautamäki	158
9.	(Norway) Bjørn Einar Romøren	145
10.	(Austria) Andreas Widhölzl	133

== Participating nations and athletes ==
The number of jumpers a nation was allowed to nominate was dependent on previous results. In Innsbruck and Bischofshofen, the amount of Austrian athletes was doubled.

The defending champion was Janne Ahonen. Six other competitors had also previously won the Four Hills tournament: Andreas Goldberger in 1992-93 and 1994–95, Primož Peterka in 1996-97, Kazuyoshi Funaki in 1997-98, Andreas Widhölzl in 1999-00, Adam Małysz in 2000-01 and Sven Hannawald in 2001-02.

The following athletes were nominated:

Nation	Starting Spots	Number of Athletes	Athletes
Germany	8	8	Sven Hannawald, Michael Uhrmann, Maximilian Mechler, Georg Spaeth, Martin Schmitt, Stephan Hocke, Alexander Herr, Jörg Ritzerfeld
Austria	8 + 8	16	Martin Höllwarth, Andreas Widhölzl, Thomas Morgenstern, Andreas Goldberger, Andreas Kofler, Florian Liegl, Reinhard Schwarzenberger, Martin Koch; National Group: Wolfgang Loitzl, Stefan Kaiser, Roland Müller, Mathias Hafele, Stefan Thurnbichler, Manuel Fettner, Christian Nagiller, Balthasar Schneider
Belarus	2	2	Maksim Anisimov, Dimitri Afanasenko (Oberstorf only)
China	2	2	Li Yang (Garmisch-Partenkirchen onward), Tian Zhandong (Garmisch-Partenkirchen onward)
Czech Republic	3	3	Jakub Janda (until Innsbruck), Jan Matura (until Innsbruck), Michal Doležal (until Garmisch-Partenkirchen)
Estonia	2	2	Jens Salumäe, Jaan Jüris
Finland	8	8	Janne Ahonen, Tami Kiuru, Veli-Matti Lindström, Matti Hautamäki, Akseli Kokkonen, Jussi Hautamäki, Arttu Lappi (until Garmisch-Partenkirchen), Janne Happonen (until Garmisch-Partenkirchen)
France	2	2	Emmanuel Chedal, Nicolas Dessum
Italy	3	3	Alessio Bolognani (Garmisch-Partenkirchen only), Giancarlo Adami (Garmisch-Partenkirchen only), Stefano Chiapolino (Garmisch-Partenkirchen only)
Japan	5	5	Noriaki Kasai, Hiroki Yamada, Hideharu Miyahira, Kazuyoshi Funaki, Akira Higashi
Kazakhstan	2	2	Radik Zhaparov, Asan Tahtahunov
Netherlands	1	1	Christoph Kreuzer (until Garmisch-Partenkirchen)
Norway	8	8	Roar Ljøkelsøy, Sigurd Pettersen, Bjørn Einar Romøren, Tommy Ingebrigtsen, Anders Bardal, Henning Stensrud, Morten Solem, Lars Bystøl
Poland	3	4	Adam Małysz, Wojciech Tajner, Tomisław Tajner (until Garmisch-Partenkirchen), Marcin Bachleda (Innsbruck onward)
Russia	2	4	Denis Kornilov (Oberstorf and Bischofshofen), Dmitry Ipatov (Oberstorf and Bischofshofen), Alexei Silaev (Garmisch-Partenkirchen and Innsbruck), Dmitri Vassiliev (Garmisch-Partenkirchen and Innsbruck)
Slovakia	1	1	Martin Mesík
Slovenia	5	5	Peter Žonta, Rok Benkovič, Robert Kranjec, Damjan Fras, Primož Peterka
South Korea	1	1	Kang Chil-ku
Sweden	2	3	Johan Erikson, Andreas Arén (until Innsbruck), Isak Grimholm (Bischofshofen only)
Switzerland	2	2	Andreas Küttel, Simon Ammann
United States	2	2	Clint Jones, Brian Welch (Garmisch-Partenkirchen and Bischofshofen)

== Results ==
=== Oberstorf ===
(Germany) Schattenbergschanze, Oberstorf
28-29 December 2003

Jumping 133.0 meters, Sigurd Pettersen was already in the lead after the first round. During the rest of the tournament, only Martin Höllwarth equalled this distance. In the last jump, Pettersen then soared to 143.5 meters, setting a new hill record and securing his victory.

Qualification winner: (Norway) Sigurd Pettersen

Rank	Name	Points
1	(Norway) Sigurd Pettersen	295.2
2	(Austria) Thomas Morgenstern	272.7
3	(Austria) Martin Höllwarth	269.1
4	(Germany) Michael Uhrmann	267.9
5	(Japan) Noriaki Kasai	261.8
6	(Slovenia) Rok Benkovič	261.6
7	(Germany) Georg Spaeth	261.3
8	(Norway) Tommy Ingebrigtsen	260.2
9	(Poland) Adam Małysz	254.4
9	(Norway) Roar Ljøkelsøy	254.4

=== Garmisch-Partenkirchen ===
(Germany) Große Olympiaschanze, Garmisch-Partenkirchen
31 December 2003 - 1 January 2004

Qualification winner: (Finland) Janne Ahonen

Rank	Name	Points
1	(Norway) Sigurd Pettersen	253.8
2	(Austria) Martin Höllwarth	253.1
3	(Germany) Georg Spaeth	248.7
4	(Finland) Janne Ahonen	248.5
5	(Slovenia) Peter Žonta	241.2
6	(Japan) Noriaki Kasai	239.8
7	(Germany) Michael Uhrmann	238.6
8	(Austria) Thomas Morgenstern	233.7
9	(Germany) Sven Hannawald	231.9
10	(Finland) Veli-Matti Lindström	230.8

=== Innsbruck ===
(Austria) Bergiselschanze, Innsbruck
03-4 January 2004

Aged 24, Slovenian jumper Peter Žonta celebrated the first and only World Cup victory of his career in Innsbruck. Runners-up Lindström, for whom two second places were career bests, was denied this honour.

Qualification winner: (Finland) Janne Ahonen

Rank	Name	Points
1	(Slovenia) Peter Žonta	265.2
2	(Finland) Veli-Matti Lindström	253.9
3	(Finland) Janne Ahonen	253.8
4	(Norway) Sigurd Pettersen	251.8
5	(Austria) Martin Höllwarth	251.7
6	(Japan) Noriaki Kasai	249.5
7	(Austria) Thomas Morgenstern	247.6
8	(Norway) Lars Bystøl	245.7
9	(Germany) Sven Hannawald	244.4
10	(Germany) Georg Spaeth	242.6

=== Bischofshofen ===
(Austria) Paul-Ausserleitner-Schanze, Bischofshofen
05-6 January 2004

Qualification winner: (Switzerland) Andreas Küttel

Rank	Name	Points
1	(Norway) Sigurd Pettersen	265.8
2	(Slovenia) Peter Žonta	263.4
3	(Finland) Janne Ahonen	261.3
4	(Austria) Thomas Morgenstern	258.9
5	(Austria) Martin Höllwarth	257.6
6	(Germany) Georg Spaeth	257.2
7	(Finland) Veli-Matti Lindström	256.1
8	(Finland) Matti Hautamäki	251.7
9	(Germany) Michael Uhrmann	250.2
10	(Norway) Roar Ljøkelsøy	247.1

== Final ranking ==
Rank	Name	Oberstorf	Garmisch-Partenkirchen	Innsbruck	Bischofshofen	Points
1	(Norway) Sigurd Pettersen	1st	1st	4th	1st	1066.6
2	(Austria) Martin Höllwarth	3rd	2nd	5th	5th	1031.5
3	(Slovenia) Peter Žonta	11th	5th	1st	2nd	1023.6
4	(Austria) Thomas Morgenstern	2nd	8th	7th	4th	1012.9
5	(Finland) Janne Ahonen	13th	4th	3rd	3rd	1012.6
6	(Germany) Georg Spaeth	7th	3rd	10th	6th	1009.8
7	(Germany) Michael Uhrmann	4th	7th	11th	9th	998.7
8	(Japan) Noriaki Kasai	5th	6th	6th	11th	996.5
9	(Norway) Roar Ljøkelsøy	9th	14th	19th	10th	956.5
10	(Norway) Lars Bystøl	21st	11th	8th	13th	952.6
