= Kulm (ski flying venue) =

Ski flying hill in Tauplitz, Austria

Coordinates: 47°32′31.67″N 13°59′59.51″E

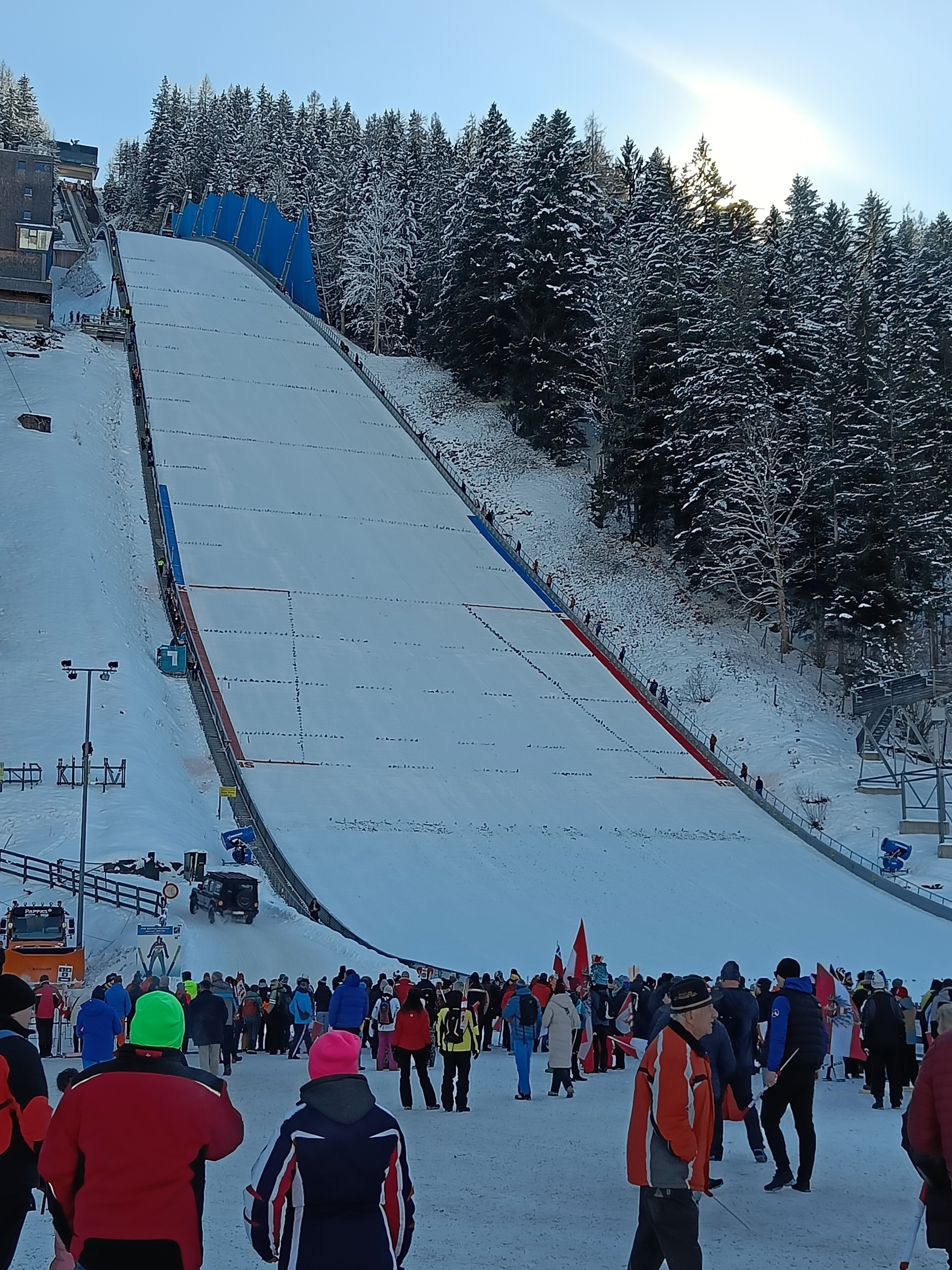
- Kulm in January 2023
- Constructor: Ing. Hans Peyerl
- Location: Tauplitz
- Opened: Hill test: 18 February 1950; Unofficially: 8 March 1950; FIS Official opening: 27 February 1953
- Renovated: 1953, 1975, 1986, 1996, 2015

Size
- K–point: 200 m
- Hill size: 235 m
- Longest jump (unofficial / fall): 247.5 m (812 ft) (Slovenia) Žiga Jelar (27 January 2023)
- Hill record: 245,5 m (801 ft) (Slovenia) Domen Prevc (1 March 2026)

Top events
- Ski Flying World Championships: 1975, 1986, 1996, 2006, 2016

Kulm is a ski flying hill located in Tauplitz/Bad Mitterndorf, Styria, Austria opened in 1950.

In 2003, The women's world record at 200 metres was set by Daniela Iraschko-Stolz, who at the time was the only woman in history to have jumped over two hundred meters.

Furthermore, the men's world record has been set three times at Kulm (1962, 1965 and 1986).

This hill is one of only five of its type in the world, allowing for jumps of more than 240 metres. The current hill record of 245.5 m (802 ft) was set by Domen Prevc on 1st March 2026.

They hosted the five FIS Ski Flying World Championships here in 1975, 1986, 1996, 2006, and 2016.

In 2015, the hill was last renovated to a current K200 and HS235, with much longer jumps possible.

== History ==
=== 1948/49: Hill construction ===
Construction began in 1948 under leadership Viktor Stüger, president of Salzkammergut Ski Association, completed in 1949 as the largest natural ski jumping hill in the world, designed by Ing. Hans Peyerl.

=== 1950: First unofficial event held ===
On 8–12 March 1950, opening International Ski Flying Week competition was held on new built ski flying hill. Hubert Neuper Sr. was honoured to be the first to try new hill. The last two days counted for "Longest Ski Jump" competition won by Rudi Dietrich (103 metres) ahead of Hans Eder (102 m) and third placed shared by Werfener Huber and Fritz Ruepp (both 94 metres). However, International Ski Federation (FIS) did not approve the hill and not even this unofficial competition, as it turned out to be, that hill was very poorly and insufficiently built, by far from the International standards valid back then.

=== 1951: Second unofficial event held ===
On 16–18 March 1951, second International Ski Flying Week, an unofficial competition was held in front of total 15,000 people. Summary of total length of four jumps counted into final score. Already on first day, Bradl set new hill record at 115 meters. He was also the winner of the 4 jumps competition with 530 meters in total, in front of the 2nd ranked West German Sepp Hohenleitner (504 meters) and the 3rd ranked Rudi Dietrich (501 meters). Hill was rebuilt with many improvements, but to receive approval from the FIS to organize the official International Ski Flying Week, further requirements had to be met. Hill was again re-designed by Ing. Hans Peyerl in cooperation with the ski jumping FIS consultant Ing. Straumann.

In 1952, Salzkammergut Ski Association, governed body responsible for the hill was dissolved, because Ausseerland came back to Styria. In this way, it was possible to make this hill a top priority for the Styrian state government, which assigned the responsibility to the Styrian Ski Association.

=== 1953: Hill officially opened with FIS approval ===
On 27 February–1 March 1953, three-day competition, 1st official "FIS International Ski Flying Week", finally recognized by FIS due to many upgrades. About 50,000 people visited the event. Josef Bradl won the competition with 449.8 points ahead of Andreas Däscher and Roy Sherwood.

On 10–11 March 1956, two-day competition, 2nd official "International Ski Flying Week" was held. Total four jumps counted into official result, two best jumps from each day. Peter Lesser won the event with total 428.5 points ahead of Veikko Heinonen (FIN) and Olaf B. Bjørnstad (NOR).

On 20–22 March 1959, three-day competition, 3rd official "International Ski Flying Week" was held, on the last day alone crowd of 30,000 people. Six jumps in total, two best from each day counted into official result. Torbjørn Yggeseth (NOR), founder of FIS World Cup won the event.

=== 1962: Lesser set first world record ===
On 1–4 March 1962, three-day competition, 4th official "International Ski Flying Week" was held. Already on the first day, at the official training, East German Peter Lesser tied the world record with Jože Šlibar (Oberstdorf 1961), first on this hill, at 141 m (463 ft). His teammate Helmut Recknagel won ahead of two West Germans Wolfgang Happle and Max Bolkart, watched by more than 40,000 people on Sunday, the last day alone.

=== 1965: Lesser set second world record ===
On 19–21 March 1965, three-day competition, "K.O.P. International Ski Flying Week" was held. First day (Friday) counted as official training, but also as a reserved date, if one of two competition days (Saturday or Sunday) was cancelled, would be calculated into official result. Already on first day, Bjørn Wirkola fell at world record distance at 144 meters (472 ft). On Saturday, Peter Lesser also fell at world record distance at 147 metres (482 ft). On Sunday, in front of 30,000 people, Peter Lesser set official world record for the second time here after three years at 145.5 metres (477 ft).

=== 1971: Competition blown away ===
On 19–21 March 1971, three-day competition, "K.O.P. International Ski Flying Week", which would also be counting for "Europa Cup", was due to strong wind all three days, first and only time in history completely cancelled. Only four trial jumpers managed to perform the last day. Saturday and Sunday results were planned to count into official results, and if one of them was cancelled, Friday results would be counting as a reserve.

=== 1986: Horrible crashes and WR tied ===
On 8–9 March 1986, Kulm hosted "9th FIS Ski Flying World Championships" at enlarged and rebuilt with new K185 point, renovation plan inspired by Planica. More than 50,000 people in total visited in all three days. It started great already on official training (Friday), with new hill record at 188 meters (617 ft) set by Austrian Franz Neuländtner. On the last day (Sunday), Masahiro Akimoto, Ulf Findeisen and Rolf Åge Berg crashed very hard, from high in the air direct to the ground. Four best jumps in total (2 of 3 best jumps each day) counted into final results. For the great final Andreas Felder who became world champion, set the world record at 191 m (627 feet) and equaled it with Matti Nykänen (1985).

=== 1996: World Championships counted also for World Cup ===
On 10–11 February 1996, two-day competition "14th FIS Ski Flying World Championships", with each day also counting for FIS World Cup, was held. Total of 130,000 people gathered in all four days. It all started with free training on Thursday, when Jens Weißflog (201 m) became the first who managed to surpass two-hundred-meter mark on this hill and 8th jump over this barrier in history. Andreas Goldberger became world champion in front of home crowd with total four jumps, two from each day counting (183, 183, 194 and 198 m), with final score of total 738.1 points.

== Events ==
FIS Ski Flying World Championships (in 1996 also the World Cup event.)

Date	Year	Hillsize	Winner	Second	Third
↓ International Ski Flying Week ↓ (FIS did not officially recognize those two competitions)
11–12 March	1950	K95	(Austria) Rudi Dietrich	(Austria) Hans Eder	(Austria) Werfener Huber (Austria) Fritz Ruepp
16–18 March	1951	K95	(Austria) Sepp Bradl	(West Germany) Sepp Hohenleitner	(Austria) Rudi Dietrich
↓ FIS International Ski Flying Week ↓
27 February — 1 March	1953	K120	(Austria) Sepp Bradl	(Switzerland) Andreas Däscher	(United States) Roy Sherwood
10–11 March	1956	K120	(West Germany) Werner Lesser	(Finland) Veikko Heinonen	(Norway) Olaf B. Bjørnstad
20–22 March	1959	K120	(Norway) Torbjørn Yggeseth	(East Germany) Helmut Recknagel	(Austria) Walter Habersatter
2–4 March	1962	K120	(East Germany) Helmut Recknagel	(West Germany) Wolfgang Happle	(West Germany) Max Bolkart
↓ K.O.P. International Ski Flying Week ↓
19–21 March	1965	K120	(West Germany) Henrik Ohlmeyer	(East Germany) Bernd Karwofsky	(East Germany) Peter Lesser
3 March	1968	K120	(Czechoslovakia) Zbyněk Hubač	(Austria) Reinhold Bachler	(Czechoslovakia) Jiří Raška
↓ K.O.P. International Ski Flying Week = FIS Europa Cup ↓
19–21 March	1971	K120	strong wind all three days; only four jumps held in total		
↓ 3rd FIS Ski Flying World Championships ↓
14–16 March	1975	K165	(Czechoslovakia) Karel Kodejška	(East Germany) Rainer Schmidt	(Austria) Karl Schnabl
↓ K.O.P. International Ski Flying Week ↓
3–5 March	1978	K165	(West Germany) Peter Leitner	(East Germany) Falko Weißpflog	(Austria) Alois Lipburger
↓ FIS World Cup ↓
12 March	1982	K165	(Finland) Matti Nykänen	(Austria) Hubert Neuper	(Austria) Andreas Felder
13 March	1982	K165	(Austria) Hubert Neuper	(Finland) Matti Nykänen	(Norway) Ole Bremseth
14 March	1982	K165	(Austria) Hubert Neuper	(Norway) Ole Bremseth	(Austria) Armin Kogler
↓ 9th FIS Ski Flying World Championships ↓
8–9 March	1986	K185	(Austria) Andreas Felder	(Austria) Franz Neuländtner	(Finland) Matti Nykänen
↓ FIS World Cup ↓
23 February	1991	K185	(Switzerland) Stephan Zünd	(Finland) Ari-Pekka Nikkola	(Sweden) Per-Inge Tällberg
24 February	1991	K185	(Austria) Stefan Horngacher	(Germany) Ralph Gebstedt	(Austria) Heinz Kuttin
30 January	1993	K185	(Czech Republic) Jaroslav Sakala	(Austria) Werner Haim	(Austria) Andreas Goldberger
31 January	1993	K185	(Czech Republic) Jaroslav Sakala	(France) Didier Mollard	(Austria) Andreas Goldberger
↓ 14th FIS Ski Flying World Championships = FIS World Cup ↓
10 February	1996	K185	(Finland) Janne Ahonen	(Austria) Andreas Goldberger	(Finland) Ari-Pekka Nikkola
11 February	1996	K185	(Austria) Andreas Goldberger	(Germany) Christof Duffner	(Finland) Janne Ahonen
Championships (10–11 February)			(Austria) Andreas Goldberger	(Finland) Janne Ahonen	(Slovenia) Urban Franc
↓ FIS World Cup ↓
8 February	1997	K185	(Japan) Takanobu Okabe	(Austria) Andreas Goldberger	(Slovenia) Primož Peterka
9 February	1997	K185	(Slovenia) Primož Peterka	(Austria) Andreas Goldberger	(Japan) Takanobu Okabe
19 February	2000	K185	(Germany) Sven Hannawald	(Austria) Andreas Widhölzl	(Norway) Tommy Ingebrigtsen
20 February	2000	K185	cancelled due to strong wind		
1 February	2003	K185	(Austria) Florian Liegl	(Germany) Sven Hannawald	(Poland) Adam Małysz
2 February	2003	K185	(Germany) Sven Hannawald	(Austria) Florian Liegl	(Finland) Matti Hautamäki
15 January	2005	HS200	(Austria) Andreas Widhölzl	(Norway) Roar Ljøkelsøy	(Poland) Adam Małysz
16 January	2005	HS200	(Poland) Adam Małysz	(Austria) Andreas Widhölzl	(Finland) Risto Jussilainen
↓ 19th FIS Ski Flying World Championships ↓
13–14 January	2006	HS200	(Norway) Roar Ljøkelsøy	(Austria) Andreas Widhölzl	(Austria) Thomas Morgenstern
15 January	2006	HS200	Norway Bjørn Einar Romøren; Lars Bystøl; Tommy Ingebrigtsen; Roar Ljøkelsøy	Finland Janne Happonen; Tami Kiuru; Matti Hautamäki; Janne Ahonen	Germany Michael Neumayer; Georg Späth; Alexander Herr; Michael Uhrmann
↓ FIS World Cup ↓
10 January	2009	HS200	(Austria) Gregor Schlierenzauer	(Switzerland) Simon Ammann	(Austria) Martin Koch
11 January	2009	HS200	(Austria) Gregor Schlierenzauer	(Finland) Harri Olli	(Switzerland) Simon Ammann
9 January	2010	HS200	(Slovenia) Robert Kranjec	(Switzerland) Simon Ammann	(Austria) Martin Koch
10 January	2010	HS200	(Austria) Gregor Schlierenzauer	(Slovenia) Robert Kranjec	(Finland) Harri Olli
14 January	2012	HS200	strong wind; postponed to the next day morning as event No.1		
15 January	2012	HS200	(Slovenia) Robert Kranjec	(Austria) Thomas Morgenstern	(Norway) Anders Bardal
15 January	2012	HS200	(Norway) Anders Bardal	(Japan) Daiki Ito	(Poland) Kamil Stoch
11 January	2014	HS200	(Japan) Noriaki Kasai	(Slovenia) Peter Prevc	(Austria) Gregor Schlierenzauer
12 January	2014	HS200	(Slovenia) Peter Prevc	(Austria) Gregor Schlierenzauer	(Japan) Noriaki Kasai
10 January	2015	HS225	(Germany) Severin Freund	(Austria) Stefan Kraft	(Slovenia) Jurij Tepeš
11 January	2015	HS225	cancelled due to strong wind		
↓ 24th FIS Ski Flying World Championships ↓
15–16 January	2016	HS225	(Slovenia) Peter Prevc	(Norway) Kenneth Gangnes	(Austria) Stefan Kraft
17 January	2016	HS225	Norway Anders Fannemel; Johann André Forfang; Daniel-André Tande; Kenneth Gangnes	Germany Andreas Wellinger; Stephan Leyhe; Richard Freitag; Severin Freund	Austria Stefan Kraft; Manuel Poppinger; Manuel Fettner; Michael Hayböck
↓ FIS World Cup ↓
13 January	2018	HS235	(Norway) Andreas Stjernen	(Norway) Daniel-André Tande	(Switzerland) Simon Ammann
14 January	2018	HS235	cancelled due to strong wind		
15 February	2020	HS235	(Poland) Piotr Żyła	(Slovenia) Timi Zajc	(Austria) Stefan Kraft
16 February	2020	HS235	(Austria) Stefan Kraft	(Japan) Ryōyū Kobayashi	(Slovenia) Timi Zajc
28 January	2023	HS235	(Norway) Halvor Egner Granerud	(Austria) Stefan Kraft	(Slovenia) Domen Prevc
29 January	2023	HS235	(Norway) Halvor Egner Granerud	(Slovenia) Timi Zajc	(Austria) Stefan Kraft

== Hill record ==
=== Men ===
Possible HRs, start order in 2R unclear (7.3.1986) – Bauer (176m), Klauser (175m), Suorsa (172m), Nykänen (170m), Findeisen (169m).

Date		Length
18 February 1950	(Austria) Hubert Neuper Sr.	75.0 m (246 ft)
18 February 1950	(Austria) Hubert Neuper Sr.	93.0 m (305 ft)
18 February 1950	(Austria) Hubert Neuper Sr.	96.0 m (315 ft)
8 March 1950	(Austria) Alois Leodolter	100.0 m (328 ft)
9 March 1950	(Austria) Rudi Dietrich	101.0 m (331 ft)
11 March 1950	(Austria) Hans Eder	102.0 m (335 ft)
11 March 1950	(Austria) Hans Eder	106.5 m (349 ft)
12 March 1950	(West Germany) Rudi Gering	104.0 m (341 ft)
12 March 1950	(Austria) Hans Eder	102.5 m (336 ft)
12 March 1950	(Austria) Rudi Dietrich	103.0 m (338 ft)
16 March 1951	(Austria) Sepp Bradl	115.0 m (377 ft)
27 February 1953	(West Germany) Toni Brutscher	116.0 m (381 ft)
27 February 1953	(United States) Roy Sherwood	120.0 m (394 ft)
28 February 1953	(Austria) Sepp Bradl	120.0 m (394 ft)
9 March 1956	(East Germany) Werner Lesser	125.0 m (410 ft)
20 March 1959	(Norway) Torbjørn Yggeseth	127.0 m (467 ft)
1 March 1962	(East Germany) Peter Lesser	141.0 m (463 ft)
19 March 1965	(Norway) Bjørn Wirkola	144.0 m (472 ft)
20 March 1965	(East Germany) Peter Lesser	147.0 m (482 ft)
21 March 1965	(East Germany) Peter Lesser	145.5 m (477 ft)
15 March 1975	(Austria) Karl Schnabl	151.0 m (495 ft)

Date		Length
2 March 1978	(East Germany) Matthias Buse	151.0 m (495 ft)
5 March 1978	(Austria) Edi Federer	164.0 m (538 ft)
12 March 1982	(Austria) Hubert Neuper	166.0 m (545 ft)
12 March 1982	(Finland) Matti Nykänen	166.0 m (545 ft)
14 March 1982	(Austria) Hubert Neuper	167.0 m (548 ft)
14 March 1982	(Finland) Matti Nykänen	169.0 m (555 ft)
7 March 1986	(Austria) Franz Neuländtner	188.0 m (617 ft)
9 March 1986	(Austria) Andreas Felder	191.0 m (627 ft)
8 February 1996	(Germany) Jens Weißflog	201.0 m (659 ft)
8 February 1997	(Japan) Takanobu Okabe	205.0 m (673 ft)
20 February 2000	(Austria) Andreas Goldberger	209.5 m (687 ft)
31 January 2003	(Austria) Christian Nagiller	220.0 m (722 ft)
31 January 2003	(Germany) Sven Hannawald	214.0 m (702 ft)
10 January 2009	(Austria) Gregor Schlierenzauer	215.5 m (707 ft)
9 January 2015	(Slovenia) Jurij Tepeš	220.0 m (722 ft)
9 January 2015	(Slovenia) Robert Kranjec	221.0 m (725 ft)
9 January 2015	(Germany) Severin Freund	237.5 m (779 ft)
15 January 2016	(Japan) Noriaki Kasai	240.5 m (789 ft)
15 January 2016	(Slovenia) Peter Prevc	243.0 m (797 ft)
16 January 2016	(Slovenia) Peter Prevc	244.0 m (801 ft)
27 January 2023	(Slovenia) Žiga Jelar	247.5 m (812 ft)
1 March 2026	(Slovenia) Domen Prevc	245.5 m (805 ft)

Fall or touch at world record distance. Invalid.
Fall or touch at hill record distance. Invalid.

=== Ladies ===
Date		Length
4 February 1997	(Austria) Eva Ganster	141.0 m (472 ft)
5 February 1997	(Austria) Eva Ganster	161.0 m (528 ft)
6 February 1997	(Austria) Eva Ganster	163.0 m (535 ft)
7 February 1997	(Austria) Eva Ganster	164.5 m (540 ft)
9 February 1997	(Austria) Eva Ganster	165.0 m (541 ft)
9 February 1997	(Austria) Eva Ganster	167.0 m (548 ft)
29 January 2003	(Austria) Daniela Iraschko-Stolz	188.0 m (618 ft)
29 January 2003	(Austria) Daniela Iraschko-Stolz	200.0 m (656 ft)

== Technical data ==
- Hillsize – HS235
- Inrun angle – 35.3°
- Inrun length – 117.4 m
- Calculation point – K200
- Take-off table (height) – 4.75 m
- Landing zone angle – 30.5° to 37.5°
- Vertical (from top to bottom) – 197 m
- Vertical (take-off table to bottom) – 135 m
