= 2003 FIS Ski Jumping Grand Prix =

International ski jumping competition

Ski Jumping Grand Prix 2003
Winners
- Overall: (Austria) Thomas Morgenstern
- Nations Cup: Austria

Competitions
- Venues: 4
- Individual: 4
- Team: 1

The 2003 FIS Ski Jumping Grand Prix was the 10th Summer Grand Prix season in ski jumping on plastic. Season began on 9 August 2003 in Hinterzarten, Germany and ended on 31 August 2003 in Innsbruck, Austria.

== Calendar ==
=== Men ===
No.	Season	Date	Place	Hill	Size	Winner	Second	Third	Yellow bib	Det.
50	1	10 Aug 2003	(Germany) Hinterzarten	Rothaus-Schanze K-95	NH	(Austria) Thomas Morgenstern	(Finland) Tami Kiuru	(Norway) Roar Ljøkelsøy	(Austria) Thomas Morgenstern	
51	2	14 Aug 2003	(France) Courchevel	Tremplin du Praz K-120	LH	(Norway) Sigurd Pettersen	(Austria) Thomas Morgenstern	(Japan) Noriaki Kasai	(Austria) Thomas Morgenstern	
52	3	29 Aug 2003	(Italy) Predazzo	Trampolino dal Ben K-120 (night)	LH	(Finland) Akseli Kokkonen	(Austria) Martin Höllwarth	(Finland) Veli-Matti Lindström	(Austria) Thomas Morgenstern	
53	4	31 Aug 2003	(Austria) Innsbruck	Bergisel K-120	LH	(Germany) Maximilian Mechler	(Slovenia) Rok Benkovič	(Finland) Veli-Matti Lindström	(Austria) Thomas Morgenstern	

=== Men's team ===
No.	Season	Date	Place	Hill	Size	Winner	Second	Third	Yellow bib	Det.
5	1	1 Aug 2003	(Germany) Hinterzarten	Rothaus-Schanze K-95	NH	Austria Andreas Widhölzl; Reinhard Schwarzenberger; Martin Höllwarth; Thomas Morgenstern	Finland Tami Kiuru; Akseli Kokkonen; Matti Hautamäki; Janne Ahonen	Slovenia Damjan Fras; Rok Benkovič; Robert Kranjec; Primož Peterka	Austria	

== Standings ==
=== Overall ===
Rank	Ski jumper	Points
1	(Austria) Thomas Morgenstern	223
2	(Finland) Akseli Kokkonen	190
3	(Austria) Martin Höllwarth	176
4	(Slovenia) Rok Benkovič	175
5	(Norway) Roar Ljøkelsøy	150

- After 4 events.

=== Nations Cup ===
Rank	Country	Points
1	Austria	1136
2	Finland	889
3	Slovenia	677
4	Germany	645
5	Norway	541

- After 5 events.

== See also ==
- 2003–04 World Cup
