= FIS Ski Flying World Championships =

Recurring international ski flying competition

- Status: active
- Genre: sports event
- Date: December–March
- Frequency: biennial
- Location: various
- Inaugurated: 1972
- Organiser: FIS
- FIS Ski Flying World Championships 2026

The FIS Ski Flying World Championships is a ski flying event organised by the International Ski Federation (FIS) since 1972 and held every two years.

== Overview ==
The event takes place on hills much larger than ski jumping hills, with the K-point set between 185 metres (607 ft) and 200 m (660 ft). Unlike ordinary ski jumping, the Ski Flying World Champion is determined after four jumps which take place over two days. 40 jumpers qualify for the competition and jump the first round, 10 are eliminated, and the 30 remaining jumpers compete in the last three rounds. The person with most points combined after four jumps is declared the World Champion. In 2004, the FIS introduced a team event between national teams of four jumpers, with two jumps each.

The competitions are not included in the general classification of the Ski Jumping World Cup and Ski Flying World Cup. The exception to this rule were the seasons 1991/1992, 1993/1994, 1995/1996 and 1997/1998, in which the points scored during the Ski Flying World Championships in Harrachov (in 1992), in Planica (in 1994), in Tauplitz/Bad Mitterndorf (in 1996) and in Oberstdorf (in 1998).

== Championships ==
=== Hosts ===
(Slovenia) Planica	(Germany) Oberstdorf	(Austria) Tauplitz	(Norway) Vikersund	(Czech Republic) Harrachov
Letalnica bratov Gorišek	Heini-Klopfer-Skiflugschanze	Kulm	Vikersundbakken	Čerťák
Europe

=== Individual ===
#	Year	Place	Hill	Rounds	Gold	Silver	Bronze
1	1972	(Socialist Federal Republic of Yugoslavia) Planica	K165	2	(Switzerland) Walter Steiner	(East Germany) Heinz Wossipiwo	(Czechoslovakia) Jiří Raška
2	1973	(West Germany) Oberstdorf	K175	2	(East Germany) Hans-Georg Aschenbach	(Switzerland) Walter Steiner	(Czechoslovakia) Karel Kodejška
3	1975	(Austria) Tauplitz/Bad Mitterndorf	K165	3	(Czechoslovakia) Karel Kodejška	(East Germany) Rainer Schmidt	(Austria) Karl Schnabl
4	1977	(Norway) Vikersund	K150	4	(Switzerland) Walter Steiner	(Austria) Anton Innauer	(East Germany) Henry Glaß
5	1979	(Socialist Federal Republic of Yugoslavia) Planica	K165	4	(Austria) Armin Kogler	(East Germany) Axel Zitzmann	(Poland) Piotr Fijas
6	1981	(West Germany) Oberstdorf	K175	4	(Finland) Jari Puikkonen	(Austria) Armin Kogler	(Norway) Tom Levorstad
7	1983	(Czechoslovakia) Harrachov	K185	4	(East Germany) Klaus Ostwald	(Czechoslovakia) Pavel Ploc	(Finland) Matti Nykänen
8	1985	(Socialist Federal Republic of Yugoslavia) Planica	K185	3	(Finland) Matti Nykänen	(East Germany) Jens Weißflog	(Czechoslovakia) Pavel Ploc
9	1986	(Austria) Tauplitz/Bad Mitterndorf	K185	4	(Austria) Andreas Felder	(Austria) Franz Neuländtner	(Finland) Matti Nykänen
10	1988	(West Germany) Oberstdorf	K182	2	(Norway) Ole Gunnar Fidjestøl	(Socialist Federal Republic of Yugoslavia) Primož Ulaga	(Finland) Matti Nykänen
11	1990	(Norway) Vikersund	K175	2	(West Germany) Dieter Thoma	(Finland) Matti Nykänen	(East Germany) Jens Weißflog
12	1992	(Czechoslovakia) Harrachov	K185	3	(Japan) Noriaki Kasai	(Austria) Andreas Goldberger	(Italy) Roberto Cecon
13	1994	(Slovenia) Planica	K185	2	(Czech Republic) Jaroslav Sakala	(Norway) Espen Bredesen	(Italy) Roberto Cecon
14	1996	(Austria) Tauplitz/Bad Mitterndorf	K185	4	(Austria) Andreas Goldberger	(Finland) Janne Ahonen	(Slovenia) Urban Franc
15	1998	(Germany) Oberstdorf	K185	4	(Japan) Kazuyoshi Funaki	(Germany) Sven Hannawald	(Germany) Dieter Thoma
16	2000	(Norway) Vikersund	K185	2	(Germany) Sven Hannawald	(Austria) Andreas Widhölzl	(Finland) Janne Ahonen
17	2002	(Czech Republic) Harrachov	K185	2	(Germany) Sven Hannawald	(Germany) Martin Schmitt	(Finland) Matti Hautamäki
18	2004	(Slovenia) Planica	K185	4	(Norway) Roar Ljøkelsøy	(Finland) Janne Ahonen	(Finland) Tami Kiuru
19	2006	(Austria) Tauplitz/Bad Mitterndorf	HS200	4	(Norway) Roar Ljøkelsøy	(Austria) Andreas Widhölzl	(Austria) Thomas Morgenstern
20	2008	(Germany) Oberstdorf	HS213	4	(Austria) Gregor Schlierenzauer	(Austria) Martin Koch	(Finland) Janne Ahonen
21	2010	(Slovenia) Planica	HS215	4	(Switzerland) Simon Ammann	(Austria) Gregor Schlierenzauer	(Norway) Anders Jacobsen
22	2012	(Norway) Vikersund	HS225	2	(Slovenia) Robert Kranjec	(Norway) Rune Velta	(Austria) Martin Koch
23	2014	(Czech Republic) Harrachov	HS205	2	(Germany) Severin Freund	(Norway) Anders Bardal	(Slovenia) Peter Prevc
24	2016	(Austria) Tauplitz/Bad Mitterndorf	HS225	3	(Slovenia) Peter Prevc	(Norway) Kenneth Gangnes	(Austria) Stefan Kraft
25	2018	(Germany) Oberstdorf	HS235	3	(Norway) Daniel-André Tande	(Poland) Kamil Stoch	(Germany) Richard Freitag
26	2020	(Slovenia) Planica	HS240	4	(Germany) Karl Geiger	(Norway) Halvor Egner Granerud	(Germany) Markus Eisenbichler
27	2022	(Norway) Vikersund	HS240	4	(Norway) Marius Lindvik	(Slovenia) Timi Zajc	(Austria) Stefan Kraft
28	2024	(Austria) Tauplitz/Bad Mitterndorf	HS235	3	(Austria) Stefan Kraft	(Germany) Andreas Wellinger	(Slovenia) Timi Zajc
29	2026	(Germany) Oberstdorf	HS235	4	(Slovenia) Domen Prevc	(Norway) Marius Lindvik	(Japan) Ren Nikaido
30	2028	(Slovenia) Planica	HS240				

=== Team ===
#	Year	Place	Hill	Gold	Silver	Bronze
1	2004	(Slovenia) Planica	K185	Norway Roar Ljøkelsøy; Sigurd Pettersen; Bjørn Einar Romøren; Tommy Ingebrigtsen	Finland Janne Ahonen; Tami Kiuru; Matti Hautamäki; Veli-Matti Lindström	Austria Thomas Morgenstern; Andreas Widhölzl; Andreas Goldberger; Wolfgang Loitzl
2	2006	(Austria) Tauplitz/Bad Mitterndorf	HS200	Norway Roar Ljøkelsøy; Lars Bystøl; Bjørn Einar Romøren; Tommy Ingebrigtsen	Finland Janne Ahonen; Tami Kiuru; Matti Hautamäki; Janne Happonen	Germany Michael Neumayer; Georg Späth; Alexander Herr; Michael Uhrmann
3	2008	(Germany) Oberstdorf	HS213	Austria Gregor Schlierenzauer; Andreas Kofler; Thomas Morgenstern; Martin Koch	Finland Janne Ahonen; Matti Hautamäki; Harri Olli; Janne Happonen	Norway Anders Jacobsen; Tom Hilde; Anders Bardal; Bjørn Einar Romøren
4	2010	(Slovenia) Planica	HS215	Austria Gregor Schlierenzauer; Martin Koch; Thomas Morgenstern; Wolfgang Loitzl	Norway Anders Jacobsen; Johan Remen Evensen; Anders Bardal; Bjørn Einar Romøren	Finland Olli Muotka; Matti Hautamäki; Harri Olli; Janne Happonen
5	2012	(Norway) Vikersund	HS225	Austria Martin Koch; Gregor Schlierenzauer; Andreas Kofler; Thomas Morgenstern	Germany Severin Freund; Maximilian Mechler; Richard Freitag; Andreas Wank	Slovenia Robert Kranjec; Jure Šinkovec; Jurij Tepeš; Jernej Damjan
	2014	(Czech Republic) Harrachov	HS205	cancelled due to strong wind		
6	2016	(Austria) Tauplitz/Bad Mitterndorf	HS225	Norway Anders Fannemel; Johann André Forfang; Daniel-André Tande; Kenneth Gangnes	Germany Andreas Wellinger; Stephan Leyhe; Richard Freitag; Severin Freund	Austria Stefan Kraft; Manuel Poppinger; Manuel Fettner; Michael Hayböck
7	2018	(Germany) Oberstdorf	HS235	Norway Johann André Forfang; Daniel-André Tande; Robert Johansson; Andreas Stjernen	Slovenia Peter Prevc; Domen Prevc; Anže Semenič; Jernej Damjan	Poland Kamil Stoch; Piotr Żyła; Dawid Kubacki; Stefan Hula
8	2020	(Slovenia) Planica	HS240	Norway Daniel-André Tande; Johann André Forfang; Robert Johansson; Halvor Egner Granerud	Germany Constantin Schmid; Pius Paschke; Markus Eisenbichler; Karl Geiger	Poland Piotr Żyła; Andrzej Stękała; Kamil Stoch; Dawid Kubacki
9	2022	(Norway) Vikersund	HS240	Slovenia Domen Prevc; Peter Prevc; Timi Zajc; Anže Lanišek	Germany Severin Freund; Andreas Wellinger; Markus Eisenbichler; Karl Geiger	Norway Johann André Forfang; Daniel-André Tande; Halvor Egner Granerud; Marius Lindvik
10	2024	(Austria) Tauplitz/Bad Mitterndorf	HS235	Slovenia Lovro Kos; Domen Prevc; Peter Prevc; Timi Zajc	Austria Michael Hayböck; Manuel Fettner; Jan Hörl; Stefan Kraft	Germany Pius Paschke; Karl Geiger; Stephan Leyhe; Andreas Wellinger
11	2026	(Germany) Oberstdorf	HS235	Japan Ryōyū Kobayashi; Tomofumi Naito; Naoki Nakamura; Ren Nikaido	Austria Stephan Embacher; Stefan Kraft; Manuel Fettner; Jan Hörl	Norway Johann André Forfang; Kristoffer Eriksen Sundal; Benjamin Oestvold; Marius Lindvik
12	2028	(Slovenia) Planica	HS240			

== Medal table ==
After the FIS Ski Flying World Championships 2026.

=== By individual (individual competitions only) ===
(only the top ones)

Rank	Individual	Gold	Silver	Bronze	Total
1	(Switzerland) Walter Steiner	2	1	0	3
1	(West Germany) Sven Hannawald	2	1	0	3
3	(Norway) Roar Ljøkelsøy	2	0	0	2
4.	(Finland) Matti Nykänen	1	1	3	5
5	(Austria) Armin Kogler	1	1	0	2
5	(Austria) Andreas Goldberger	1	1	0	2
5	(Austria) Gregor Schlierenzauer	1	1	0	2
5	(Norway) Marius Lindvik	1	1	0	2
9	(Austria) Stefan Kraft	1	0	2	3
10	(Czechoslovakia) Karel Kodejška	1	0	1	2
10	(West Germany) Dieter Thoma	1	0	1	2
10	(Slovenia) Peter Prevc	1	0	1	2

=== By country ===
Rank	Nation	Gold	Silver	Bronze	Total
1	Norway	10	7	5	22
2	Austria	8	10	7	25
3	Slovenia	5	2	4	11
4	Germany	4	7	5	16
5	Switzerland	3	1	0	4
6	Japan	3	0	1	4
7	Finland	2	6	8	16
8	East Germany	2	4	2	8
9	Czechoslovakia	1	1	3	5
10	Czech Republic	1	0	0	1
10	West Germany	1	0	0	1
12	Poland	0	1	3	4
13	Yugoslavia	0	1	0	1
14	Italy	0	0	2	2
Totals (14 entries)		40	40	40	120

== See also ==
- Ski flying
- Ski jumping
- World's longest ski jumps
- FIS Nordic World Ski Championships
