= FIS Ski Flying World Championships 2006 =

2006 edition of the FIS Ski-Flying World Championships

- Official logo for the FIS Ski Flying World Championships 2006.
- Host city: Bad Mitterndorf, Austria
- Nations: 17
- Athletes: 52
- Events: 2
- Opening: 12 January
- Closing: 15 January
- Main venue: Kulm
- Website: Skifliegen.at

The FIS Ski Flying World Ski Championships 2006 took place on 12–15 January 2006 in Bad Mitterndorf, Austria (The International Ski Federation has location listed as Kulm, the ski jumping venue located in Bad Mitterndorf.) for the fourth time. Bad Mitterndorf hosted the championships previously in 1975, 1986, and 1996. Norway repeated as team champion while Roar Ljøkelsøy repeated as individual champion. A record four nations won medals.

== Individual ==
13-14 January 2006.

Medal	Athlete	Points
Gold	Roar Ljøkelsøy (NOR)	788.0
Silver	Andreas Widhölzl (AUT)	762.4
Bronze	Thomas Morgenstern (AUT)	752.2

Morgenstern had the longest jump of the competition with a 210.5 m final round jump. Widhölzl led after the first round, but Ljøkelsøy took the lead after the second round and ensured his victory.

== Team ==
15 January 2006.

Medal	Team	Points
Gold	Norway; Roar Ljøkelsøy; Lars Bystøl; Bjørn Einar Romøren; Tommy Ingebrigtsen	1497.9
Silver	Finland; Janne Ahonen; Tami Kiuru; Matti Hautamäki; Janne Happonen	1477.2
Bronze	Germany; Michael Neumayer; Georg Späth; Alexander Herr; Michael Uhrmann	1374.0

Slovenia's Robert Kranjec had the longest jumps in both rounds of competition at 207.0 m. Slovenia would unfortunately finish fifth because none of his other teammate could go further than 180.5 m.

== Medal table ==
Rank	Nation	Gold	Silver	Bronze	Total
1	Norway (NOR)	2	0	0	2
2	Austria (AUT)	0	1	1	2
3	Finland (FIN)	0	1	0	1
4	Germany (GER)	0	0	1	1
Totals (4 entries)		2	2	2	6
