= FIS Ski Flying World Championships 1996 =

1996 edition of the FIS Ski-Flying World Championships

- Official logo for the FIS Ski Flying World Championships 1996.
- Host city: Bad Mitterndorf, Austria
- Nations: 15
- Athletes: 50
- Events: 1
- Opening: 9 February
- Closing: 11 February
- Main venue: Kulm

The FIS Ski Flying World Ski Championships 1996 took place on 11 February 1996 in Bad Mitterndorf, Austria for the third time. Bad Mitterndorf hosted the championships previously in 1975 and 1986. At these championships, the number of jumps expanded from two to four.

== Individual ==
11 February 1996

Medal	Athlete	Points
Gold	Andreas Goldberger (AUT)	738.1
Silver	Janne Ahonen (FIN)	734.2
Bronze	Urban Franc (SLO)	701.7

== Medal table ==
Rank	Nation	Gold	Silver	Bronze	Total
1	Austria (AUT)	1	0	0	1
2	Finland (FIN)	0	1	0	1
3	Slovenia (SLO)	0	0	1	1
Totals (3 entries)		1	1	1	3
