= Peter Lesser =

German ski jumper

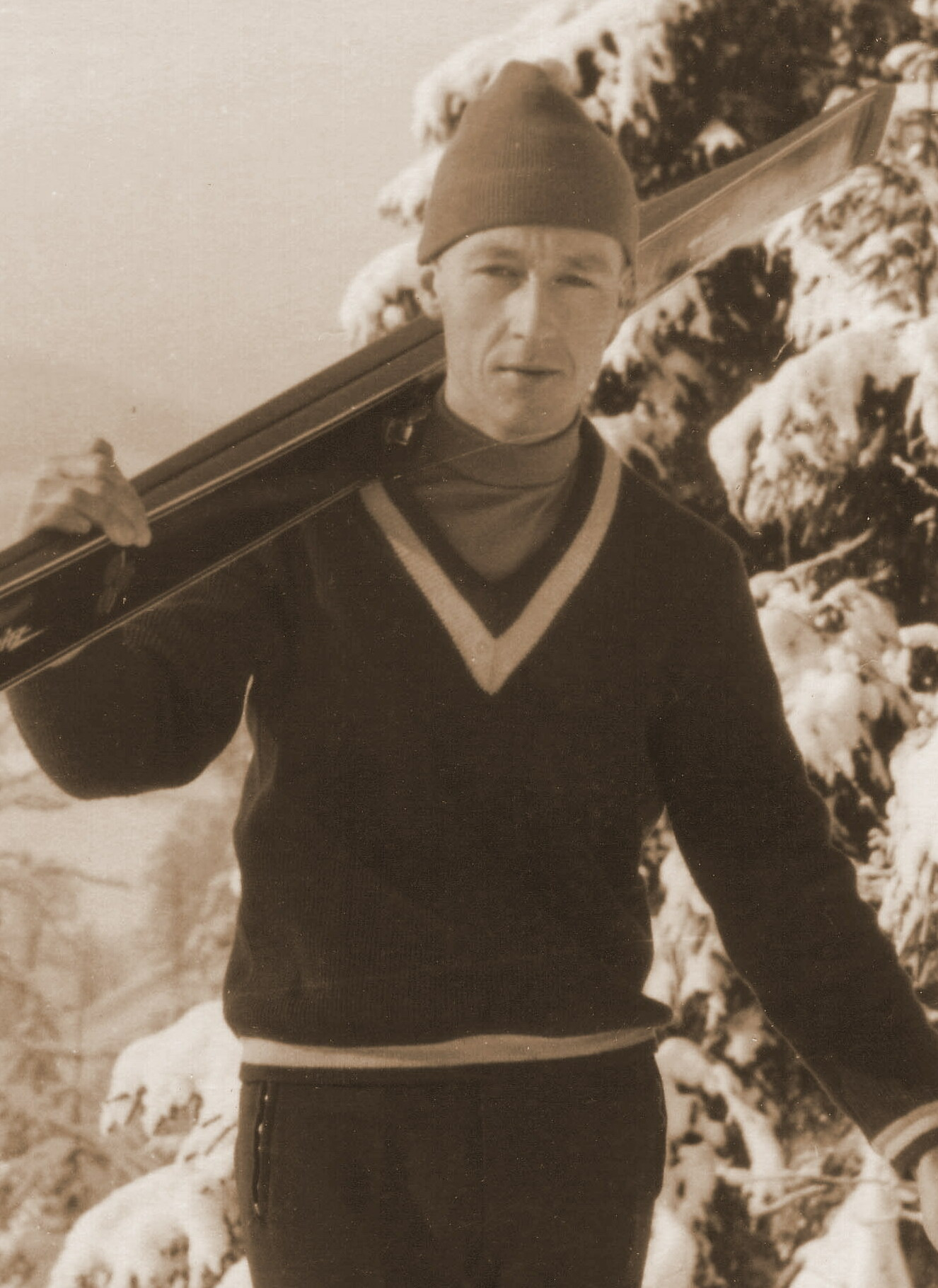
- Lesser in Oberhof, 1963

Personal information
- Nationality: East Germany
- Born: 15 August 1941 (age 84) Eisenberg, Nazi Germany

Sport
- Sport: Skiing
- Club: SC Motor Zella-Mehlis

Achievements and titles
- Personal bests: 145 m (476 ft); Tauplitz, Austria (21 March 1965)

Peter Lesser (born 15 August 1941) is an East German former ski jumper.

== Career ==
In 1962 at the Nordic World Ski Championships in Zakopane, he reached fifth place on the large hill.

He improved world record two times; 141 metres (463 ft) in 1962 and 145.5 metres (477 ft) in 1965, both on Kulm ski flying hill in Tauplitz/Bad Mitterndorf, Austria.

== Ski jumping world records ==
| Date | Hill | Location | Metres | Feet |
|---|---|---|---|---|
| 1 March 1962 | Kulm | Tauplitz/Bad Mitterndorf, Austria | 141 | 463 |
| 21 March 1965 | Kulm | Tauplitz/Bad Mitterndorf, Austria | 145.5 | 477 |
| 20 March 1965 | Kulm | Tauplitz/Bad Mitterndorf, Austria | 147 | 482 |

Not recognized! Crash at world record distance.
