= Florian Liegl =

Austrian ski jumper

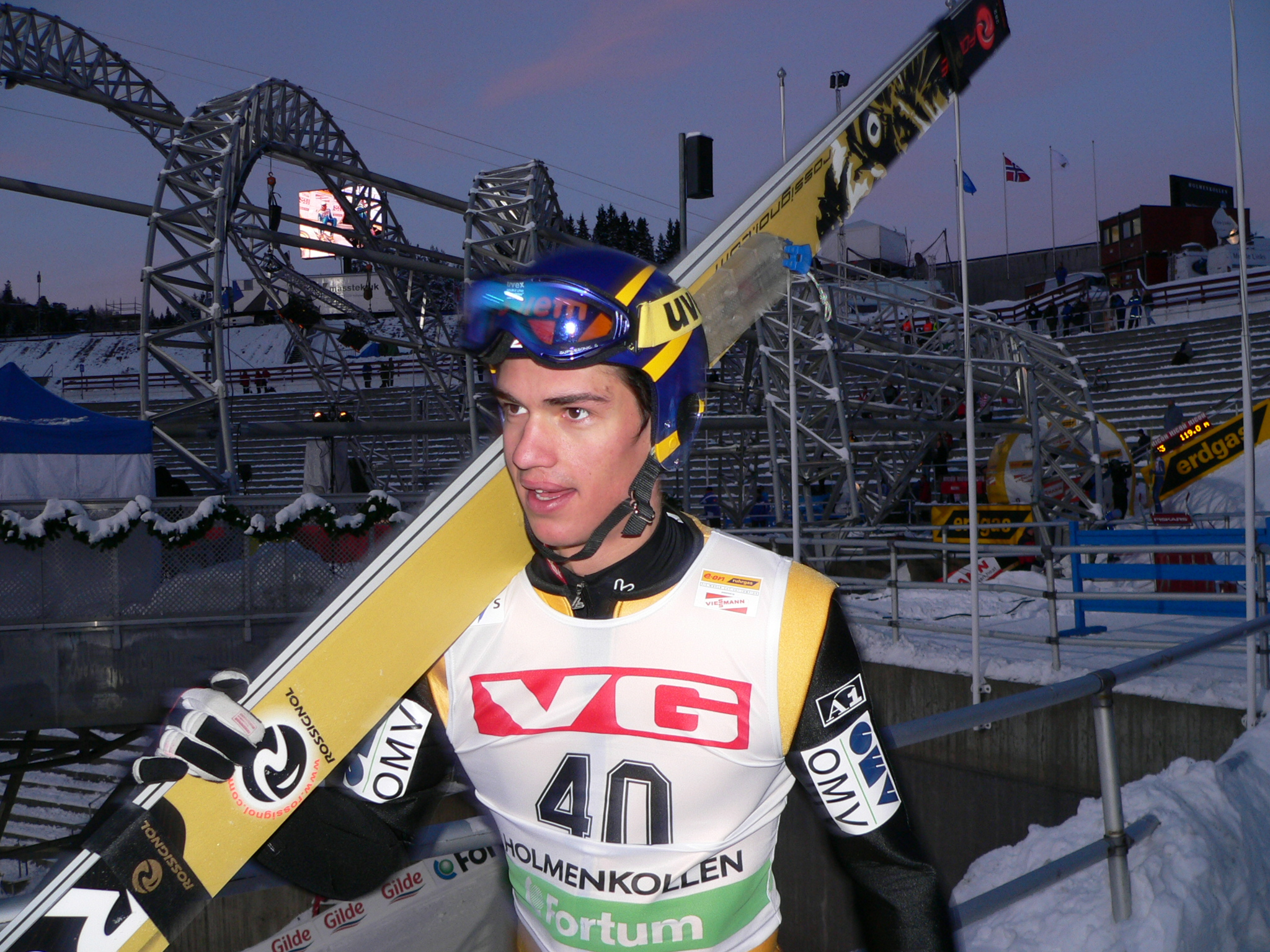
- Liegl in Oslo, 2005

Personal information
- Nationality: Austria
- Born: 1 February 1983 (age 43) Innsbruck, Austria
- Height: 1.94 m (6 ft 4 in)

Sport
- Sport: Skiing

World Cup career
- Seasons: 2000; 2003–2005; 2007
- Indiv. starts: 63
- Indiv. podiums: 8
- Indiv. wins: 1
- Team starts: 3
- Team podiums: 3
- Team wins: 1

Achievements and titles
- Personal bests: 214.5 m (704 ft); Planica, 23 March 2003
- Updated on 10 February 2016

Florian Liegl (born 1 February 1983) is an Austrian former ski jumper who competed from 1999 to 2007. His career highlight was winning a World Cup competition on 1 February 2003 in Kulm. Liegl has since worked as an assistant coach for the Austrian national ski jumping team.

== World Cup career ==
=== Standings ===
Season	Overall	4H	SF	NT	JP
1999/00	—	60	—	—	—
2002/03	5	8	N/A	7	N/A
2003/04	40	26	N/A	—	N/A
2004/05	31	31	N/A	25	N/A
2005/06	88	44	N/A	—	N/A

=== Wins ===
No.	Season	Date	Location	Hill	Size
1	2002/03	1 February 2003	(Austria) Tauplitz/Bad Mitterndorf	Kulm K185	FH
