= 2002–03 FIS Ski Jumping World Cup =

Ski jumping championship season

Winners
- World Cup: (Poland) Adam Małysz
- Four Hills Tournament: (Finland) Janne Ahonen
- Nordic Tournament: (Poland) Adam Małysz
- Nations Cup: Austria
- Most World Cup wins: (Germany) Sven Hannawald (6)

Competitions
- Venues: 17
- Individual: 27
- Team: 2
- Cancelled: 1

The 2002–03 FIS Ski Jumping World Cup was the 24th World Cup season of ski jumping. It began on 29 November 2002 at Rukatunturi in Kuusamo, Finland, and finished on 23 March 2003 at Letalnica bratov Gorišek in Planica, Slovenia. The defending World Cup champion from the previous two seasons was Adam Małysz, who continued his success by winning the overall title for a third time, as well as his second Nordic Tournament. Sven Hannawald placed second as he had done in the previous season, with Andreas Widhölzl in third. Janne Ahonen won the Four Hills Tournament for a second time. The Nations Cup was won by Austria.

On the ski flying hill in Planica, Matti Hautamäki set three consecutive world records – 227.5, 228.5 and 231 metres – in a span of four days, becoming the first ski jumper to officially break the 230 m barrier. Prior to Hautamäki's 231 m jump, Veli-Matti Lindström became the first to unofficially surpass 230 m with a jump of 232.5 m during the 21 March trial round, but his jump was rendered an invalid world record because he touched the snow with his hand.

== Calendar ==
=== Individual competitions ===
No.	Date	Location	Hill	Size	Winner	Second	Third	Yellow bib	Ref.
1	29 Nov 2002	(Finland) Kuusamo	Rukatunturi K120 (night)	LH	(Slovenia) Primož Peterka	(Poland) Adam Małysz	(Finland) Janne Ahonen	(Slovenia) Primož Peterka	
2	30 Nov 2002	(Finland) Kuusamo	Rukatunturi K120 (night)	LH	(Austria) Andreas Widhölzl	(Finland) Janne Ahonen	(Slovenia) Primož Peterka	(Slovenia) Primož Peterka	
3	7 Dec 2002	(Norway) Trondheim	Granåsen K120 (night)	LH	(Austria) Martin Höllwarth	(Norway) Sigurd Pettersen	(Germany) Michael Uhrmann	(Austria) Andreas Widhölzl	
4	8 Dec 2002	(Norway) Trondheim	Granåsen K120 (night)	LH	(Norway) Sigurd Pettersen	(Germany) Michael Uhrmann	(Austria) Martin Höllwarth	(Norway) Sigurd Pettersen	
5	14 Dec 2002	(Germany) Titisee-Neustadt	Hochfirstschanze K120	LH	(Austria) Martin Höllwarth	(Norway) Sigurd Pettersen	(Poland) Adam Małysz	(Norway) Sigurd Pettersen	
6	15 Dec 2002	(Germany) Titisee-Neustadt	Hochfirstschanze K120	LH	(Austria) Martin Höllwarth	(Austria) Andreas Goldberger	(Austria) Andreas Kofler	(Austria) Martin Höllwarth	
7	21 Dec 2002	(Switzerland) Engelberg	Gross-Titlis-Schanze K120	LH	(Finland) Janne Ahonen	(Austria) Mathias Hafele	(Germany) Sven Hannawald	(Austria) Martin Höllwarth	
8	22 Dec 2002	(Switzerland) Engelberg	Gross-Titlis-Schanze K120	LH	(Germany) Sven Hannawald	(Austria) Andreas Widhölzl	(Austria) Andreas Goldberger	(Austria) Martin Höllwarth	
9	29 Dec 2002	(Germany) Oberstdorf	Schattenbergschanze K115	LH	(Germany) Sven Hannawald	(Austria) Martin Höllwarth	(Finland) Janne Ahonen	(Austria) Martin Höllwarth	
10	1 Jan 2003	(Germany) Garmisch-Partenkirchen	Große Olympiaschanze K115	LH	(Slovenia) Primož Peterka	(Austria) Andreas Goldberger	(Poland) Adam Małysz	(Austria) Martin Höllwarth	
11	4 Jan 2003	(Austria) Innsbruck	Bergiselschanze K120	LH	(Finland) Janne Ahonen	(Austria) Florian Liegl	(Austria) Martin Höllwarth	(Austria) Martin Höllwarth	
12	6 Jan 2003	(Austria) Bischofshofen	Paul-Ausserleitner-Schanze K125	LH	(Norway) Bjørn Einar Romøren	(Germany) Sven Hannawald	(Austria) Andreas Kofler	(Austria) Martin Höllwarth	
Four Hills Tournament (29 Dec 2002 – 6 Jan 2003)					(Finland) Janne Ahonen	(Germany) Sven Hannawald	(Poland) Adam Małysz	(Austria) Martin Höllwarth	
13	11 Jan 2003	(Czech Republic) Liberec	Ještěd K120	LH	(Austria) Thomas Morgenstern	(Austria) Andreas Widhölzl	(Czech Republic) Jakub Janda	(Finland) Janne Ahonen	
14	~~12 Jan 2003~~	(Czech Republic) Liberec	Ještěd K120	LH	Cancelled			(Finland) Janne Ahonen	
15	18 Jan 2003	(Poland) Zakopane	Wielka Krokiew K120 (night)	LH	(Germany) Sven Hannawald	(Austria) Florian Liegl	(Poland) Adam Małysz	(Finland) Janne Ahonen	
16	19 Jan 2003	(Poland) Zakopane	Wielka Krokiew K120 (night)	LH	(Germany) Sven Hannawald	(Austria) Florian Liegl	(Poland) Adam Małysz	(Finland) Janne Ahonen	
17	23 Jan 2003	(Japan) Hakuba	Hakuba Ski Jumping Stadium K120 (night)	LH	(Austria) Christian Nagiller	(Finland) Matti Hautamäki	(Japan) Hideharu Miyahira	(Finland) Janne Ahonen	
18	25 Jan 2003	(Japan) Sapporo	Okurayama Ski Jump Stadium K120 (night)	LH	(Norway) Roar Ljøkelsøy	(Austria) Christian Nagiller	(Norway) Bjørn Einar Romøren	(Finland) Janne Ahonen	
19	26 Jan 2003	(Japan) Sapporo	Okurayama Ski Jump Stadium K120	LH	(Norway) Sigurd Pettersen	(Austria) Andreas Widhölzl	(Austria) Florian Liegl	(Finland) Janne Ahonen	
20	1 Feb 2003	(Austria) Bad Mitterndorf	Kulm K185	FH	(Austria) Florian Liegl	(Germany) Sven Hannawald	(Poland) Adam Małysz	(Finland) Janne Ahonen	
21	2 Feb 2003	(Austria) Bad Mitterndorf	Kulm K185	FH	(Germany) Sven Hannawald	(Austria) Florian Liegl	(Finland) Matti Hautamäki	(Finland) Janne Ahonen	
22	8 Feb 2003	(Germany) Willingen	Mühlenkopfschanze K130	LH	(Germany) Sven Hannawald	(Austria) Andreas Widhölzl	(Austria) Florian Liegl	(Finland) Janne Ahonen	
23	9 Feb 2003 ^{†}	(Germany) Willingen	Mühlenkopfschanze K130	LH	(Japan) Noriaki Kasai	(Japan) Hideharu Miyahira	(Slovenia) Robert Kranjec	(Germany) Sven Hannawald	
2003 World Championships (18 February – 1 March 2003)								(Germany) Sven Hannawald	
24	9 Mar 2003 ^{†}	(Norway) Oslo	Holmenkollbakken K115	LH	(Poland) Adam Małysz	(Austria) Florian Liegl	(Norway) Roar Ljøkelsøy	(Germany) Sven Hannawald	
25	14 Mar 2003	(Finland) Lahti	Salpausselkä K116 (night)	LH	(Poland) Adam Małysz	(Finland) Matti Hautamäki	(Germany) Sven Hannawald	(Poland) Adam Małysz	
26	15 Mar 2003	(Finland) Lahti	Salpausselkä K116 (night)	LH	(Poland) Adam Małysz	(Finland) Matti Hautamäki	(Finland) Tami Kiuru	(Poland) Adam Małysz	
Nordic Tournament (9–15 Mar 2003)					(Poland) Adam Małysz	(Finland) Matti Hautamäki	(Finland) Tami Kiuru	(Poland) Adam Małysz	
27	22 Mar 2003	(Slovenia) Planica	Letalnica bratov Gorišek K185	FH	(Finland) Matti Hautamäki	(Poland) Adam Małysz	(Austria) Martin Höllwarth	(Poland) Adam Małysz	
28	23 Mar 2003	(Slovenia) Planica	Letalnica bratov Gorišek K185	FH	(Finland) Matti Hautamäki	(Germany) Sven Hannawald	(Japan) Hideharu Miyahira	(Poland) Adam Małysz	

^† The second competition in Willingen was only a single-round competition.
^† Oslo was only a single-round competition.

=== Team competitions ===
No.	Date	Location	Hill	Size	Winner	Second	Third	Ref.
1	8 Mar 2003	(Norway) Oslo	Holmenkollbakken K115	LH	Austria; Thomas Morgenstern; Christian Nagiller; Florian Liegl; Andreas Widhölzl	Finland; Veli-Matti Lindström; Tami Kiuru; Arttu Lappi; Matti Hautamäki	Germany; Georg Späth; Michael Uhrmann; Martin Schmitt; Sven Hannawald	
2	21 Mar 2003	(Slovenia) Planica	Letalnica bratov Gorišek K185	FH	Finland; Veli-Matti Lindström; Tami Kiuru; Arttu Lappi; Matti Hautamäki	Norway; Henning Stensrud; Bjørn Einar Romøren; Roar Ljøkelsøy; Tommy Ingebrigtsen	Austria; Thomas Morgenstern; Stefan Thurnbichler; Florian Liegl; Andreas Widhölzl	

== Final standings ==
=== Overall ===
Rank	Name	Total points
1	(Poland) Adam Małysz	1357
2	(Germany) Sven Hannawald	1235
3	(Austria) Andreas Widhölzl	1028
4	(Finland) Janne Ahonen	1016
5	(Austria) Florian Liegl	986
6	(Austria) Martin Höllwarth	925
7	(Slovenia) Primož Peterka	805
8	(Finland) Matti Hautamäki	797
9	(Norway) Roar Ljøkelsøy	757
10	(Norway) Sigurd Pettersen	747

=== Four Hills Tournament ===
Rank	Name	Total points
1	(Finland) Janne Ahonen	999.9
2	(Germany) Sven Hannawald	976.3
3	(Poland) Adam Małysz	959.7
4	(Austria) Andreas Kofler	957.6
5	(Slovenia) Primož Peterka	954.7
6	(Norway) Roar Ljøkelsøy	949.3
7	(Austria) Martin Höllwarth	945.6
8	(Austria) Florian Liegl	934.2
9	(Austria) Andreas Goldberger	923.0
10	(Austria) Thomas Morgenstern	912.8

=== Nordic Tournament ===
Rank	Name	Total points
1	(Poland) Adam Małysz	300
2	(Finland) Matti Hautamäki	210
3	(Finland) Tami Kiuru	139
4	(Austria) Florian Liegl	127
5	(Austria) Martin Höllwarth	116
6	(Germany) Sven Hannawald	104
7	(Japan) Noriaki Kasai	100
8	(Norway) Roar Ljøkelsøy	92
9	(Norway) Tommy Ingebrigtsen	86
10	(Germany) Michael Uhrmann	81

=== Prize money ===
Rank	Name	Total earned (CHF)
1	(Germany) Sven Hannawald	214696
2	(Poland) Adam Małysz	152500
3	(Austria) Florian Liegl	115008
4	(Finland) Janne Ahonen	113835
5	(Finland) Matti Hautamäki	112274
6	(Austria) Andreas Widhölzl	111849
7	(Austria) Martin Höllwarth	109333
8	(Norway) Sigurd Pettersen	77000
9	(Slovenia) Primož Peterka	75771
10	(Austria) Christian Nagiller	57468

=== Nations Cup ===
Rank	Country	Total points
1	Austria	1270
2	Norway	690
3	Finland	638
4	Slovenia	551
5	Germany	433
6	Poland	362
7	Japan	259
8	Italy	47
9	Switzerland	29
10	United States	24

== World records ==
Date	Location	Hill	Ski jumper	Round	Metres	Yards	Feet	Ref.
20 Mar 2003	(Slovenia) Planica	Letalnica bratov Gorišek HS 215	(Poland) Adam Małysz	Training	225.0	246	738	
20 Mar 2003	(Slovenia) Planica	Letalnica bratov Gorišek HS 215	(Finland) Matti Hautamäki	Qualification	227.5	249	746	
21 Mar 2003	(Slovenia) Planica	Letalnica bratov Gorišek HS 215	(Finland) Veli-Matti Lindström	Trial (team)	232.5	254	763	
22 Mar 2003	(Slovenia) Planica	Letalnica bratov Gorišek HS 215	(Finland) Matti Hautamäki	Trial	228.5	250	750	
23 Mar 2003	(Slovenia) Planica	Letalnica bratov Gorišek HS 215	(Finland) Matti Hautamäki	Final	231.0	253	758	

Invalid world record due to Lindström falling upon landing.

== Medal table ==
Rank	Nation	Gold	Silver	Bronze	Total
1	Austria	8	15	11	34
2	Germany	6	4	3	13
3	Finland	5	5	4	14
4	Norway	4	3	1	8
5	Poland	3	1	5	9
6	Slovenia	2	0	2	4
7	Japan	1	1	2	4
8	Czech Republic	0	0	1	1
Totals (8 entries)		29	29	29	87
