= FIS Ski Flying World Championships 2004 =

2004 edition of the FIS Ski-Flying World Championships

- Official logo for the FIS Ski Flying World Championships 2004.
- Host city: Planica, Slovenia
- Nations: 17
- Athletes: 55
- Events: 2
- Opening: 19 February
- Closing: 22 February
- Main venue: Letalnica
- Website: Planica.info

The FIS Ski Flying World Ski Championships 2004 took place on 19–22 February 2004 in Planica, Slovenia for the record fifth time. Planica hosted the championships previously in 1972, 1979, 1985, and 1994. The team event, consisting of two jumps, debuted at these championships.

== Individual ==
20–21 February 2004.

Medal	Athlete	Points
Gold	Roar Ljøkelsøy (NOR)	832.1
Silver	Janne Ahonen (FIN)	814.1
Bronze	Tami Kiuru (FIN)	813.0

Ahonen and Germany's Georg Späth had the longest jumps of the competition with their 225.0 m second round-jumps. Norway's Tommy Ingebrigtsen led after the first round, Späth after the second round, and Kiuru after the third round.

== Team ==
22 February 2004.

Medal	Team	Points
Gold	Norway; Roar Ljøkelsøy; Sigurd Pettersen; Bjørn Einar Romøren; Tommy Ingebrigtsen	1711.8
Silver	Finland; Janne Ahonen; Tami Kiuru; Matti Hautamäki; Veli-Matti Lindström	1704.1
Bronze	Austria; Thomas Morgenstern; Andreas Widhölzl; Andreas Goldberger; Wolfgang Loitzl	1620.8

Romøren had the longest jump of the event with his second round jump of 227.0 m.

== Medal table ==
Rank	Nation	Gold	Silver	Bronze	Total
1	Norway (NOR)	2	0	0	2
2	Finland (FIN)	0	2	1	3
3	Austria (AUT)	0	0	1	1
Totals (3 entries)		2	2	2	6
