= Christian Nagiller =

Austrian ski jumper

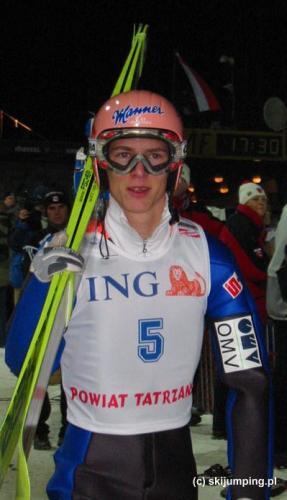
- Nagiller in Zakopane, 2003

Personal information
- Nationality: Austria
- Born: 24 June 1984 (age 42) Hall in Tirol, Austria
- Height: 1.70 m (5 ft 7 in)

Sport
- Sport: Skiing

World Cup career
- Seasons: 2000; 2003–2004
- Indiv. starts: 29
- Indiv. podiums: 2
- Indiv. wins: 1
- Team starts: 1
- Team podiums: 1
- Team wins: 1

Achievements and titles
- Personal bests: 203 m (666 ft); Planica, 20-23 March 2003
- Updated on 10 February 2016

Christian Nagiller (born 24 June 1984) is an Austrian former ski jumper.

== Career ==
Nagiller debuted in the FIS Ski Jumping World Cup in January 2000. During the 2002–03 season he became an established member of the Austrian team. In that season came his biggest achievements – a win at Hakuba and second place at Sapporo. He also attempted 220m at Kulm but fell (his personal best is 203m). After several relatively unsuccessful seasons, he retired from active ski jumping in 2006 and became a ski jumping coach.

== World Cup ==
=== Standings ===
Season	Overall	4H	SF	NT
1999/00	—	46	—	—
2002/03	18	59	N/A	29
2003/04	49	59	N/A	—

=== Wins ===
No.	Season	Date	Location	Hill	Size
1	2002/03	23 January 2003	(Japan) Hakuba	Olympic Hills K120 (night)	LH
