= Małysz =

Małysz (feminine forms: Małysz/Małyszowa/Małyszówna) is a Polish surname. Notable people with the surname include:

- Adam Małysz (born 1977), Polish ski jumper and rally driver
- Adolf Małysz (1895–1962), Polish Pentecostal priest and religious activist
- Józef Małysz (1896–?), Polish politician, member of parliament (1945–1947)
- Katarzyna Duczkowska-Małysz (born 1947), Polish economist and university lecturer, professor of economics, deputy minister of agriculture
