= FIS Ski Flying World Championships 1986 =

1986 edition of the FIS Ski-Flying World Championships

The 1986 FIS Ski Flying World Ski Championships took place on 8–9 March 1986 at Kulm in Bad Mitterndorf, Austria. The venue had previously hosted the 1975 Ski Flying World Championships.

It was the first time a nation won more than one medal at the same championships, with host nation Austria earning gold and silver in the event. For the second and final time, the championships were held in consecutive years (1972 and 1973 being the others). These championships have been held in even-numbered years since this one.

The event is notorious for three massive accidents which occurred due to dangerous wind conditions.

== Individual ==
| Medal | Athlete | Points |
|---|---|---|
| Gold | Andreas Felder (AUT) | 745.0 |
| Silver | Franz Neuländtner (AUT) | 730.5 |
| Bronze | Matti Nykänen (FIN) | 698.5 |

== Medal table ==
| Rank | Nation | Gold | Silver | Bronze | Total |
|---|---|---|---|---|---|
| 1 | Austria (AUT) | 1 | 1 | 0 | 2 |
| 2 | Finland (FIN) | 0 | 0 | 1 | 1 |
| Totals (2 entries) | | 1 | 1 | 1 | 3 |
