= FIS Ski Flying World Championships 1973 =

1973 edition of the FIS Ski-Flying World Championships

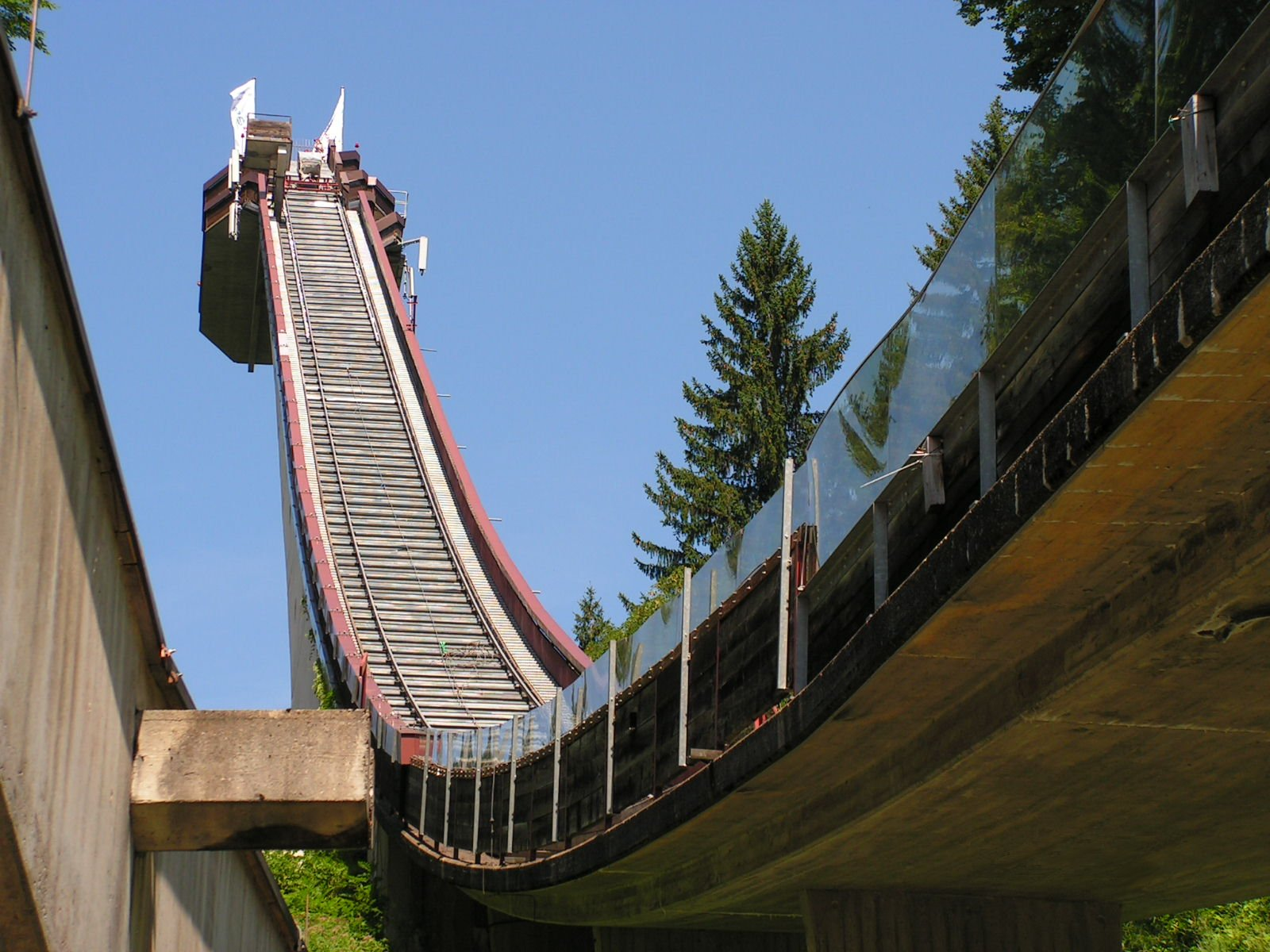
Heini-Klopfer-Skiflugschanze

The FIS Ski Flying World Ski Championships 1973 took place in Oberstdorf, West Germany between 8-10 March 1973. From 1973 to 1985, these championships would be held in odd-numbered years.

== Individual ==
Medal	Athlete	Points
Gold	Hans-Georg Aschenbach (GDR)	
Silver	Walter Steiner (SUI)	
Bronze	Karel Kodejška (TCH)	

== Medal table ==
Rank	Nation	Gold	Silver	Bronze	Total
1	East Germany (GDR)	1	0	0	1
2	Switzerland (SUI)	0	1	0	1
3	Czechoslovakia (TCH)	0	0	1	1
Totals (3 entries)		1	1	1	3
