= Hans Eder (skier) =

Nordic combined skier

Personal information
- Nationality: Austria (until 1952); Canada (since 1952)
- Born: 26 March 1927 Bad Gastein, First Austrian Republic
- Died: 28 April 2008 (aged 81) Qualicum Beach, Canada

Sport
- Sport: Skiing

Hans Eder (26 March 1927, in Bad Gastein – 28 April 2008 in Qualicum Beach, Canada) was an Austrian Nordic skier who competed during the 1950s.

== Career ==
At the 1952 Winter Olympics in Oslo, he finished ninth in the Nordic combined event, 30th in the ski jumping individual large hill, and 31st in the 18 km cross-country skiing event.
