= Roar Ljøkelsøy =

Norwegian former ski jumper (born 1976)

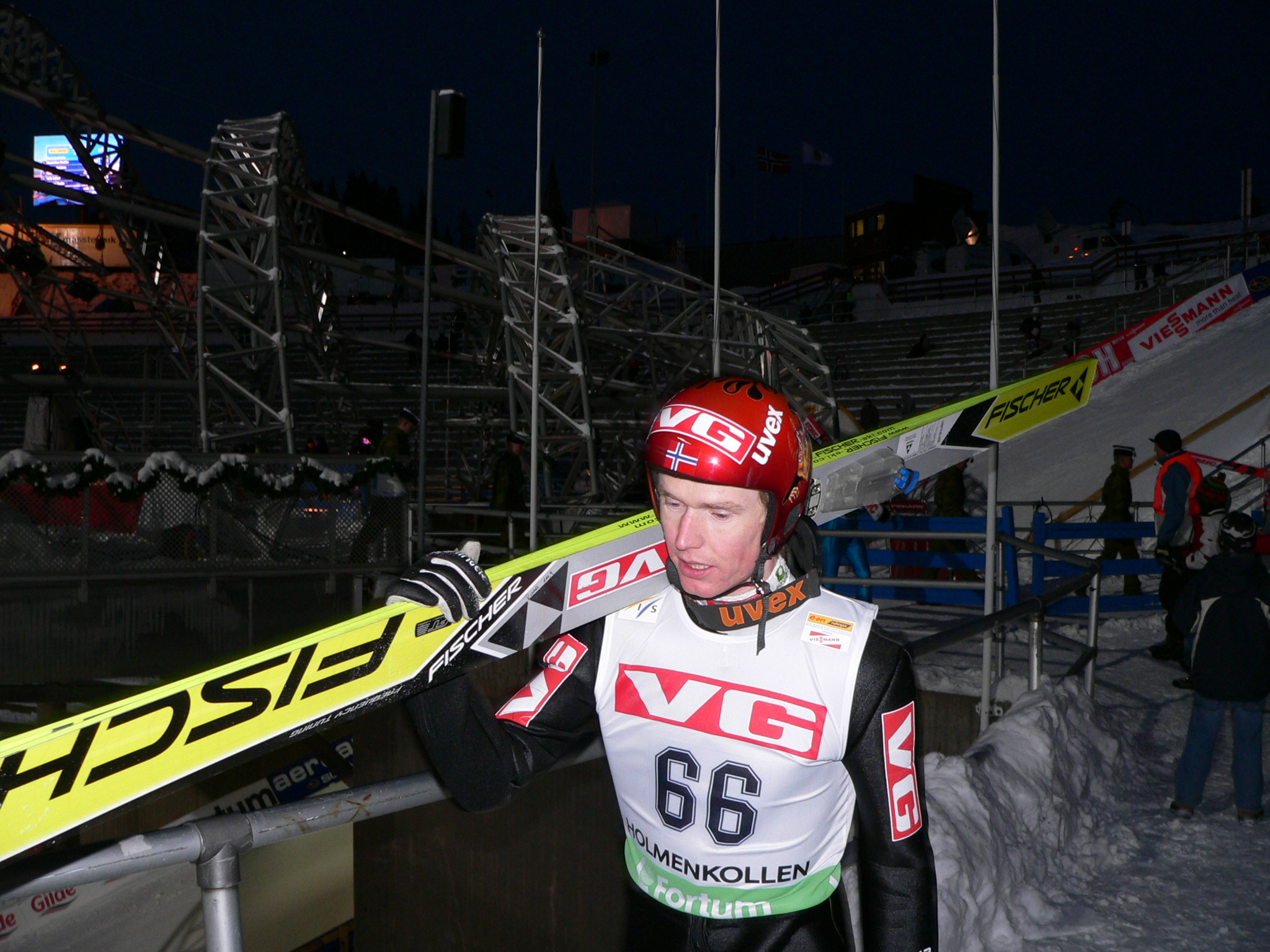
- Ljøkelsøy in Oslo, 2005

Personal information
- Nationality: Norway
- Born: 31 May 1976 (age 50) Orkdal Municipality, Norway
- Height: 1.75 m (5 ft 9 in)

Sport
- Sport: Skiing

World Cup career
- Seasons: 1993–2010
- Indiv. starts: 350
- Indiv. podiums: 32
- Indiv. wins: 11
- Team starts: 30
- Team podiums: 16
- Team wins: 6

Achievements and titles
- Personal bests: 230.5 m (756 ft); Planica, 20 March 2005
Medal record
Men's ski jumping
Event	1st	2nd	3rd
Olympic Games	0	0	2
World Championships	0	2	2
Ski Flying World Championships	4	0	0
Total	4	2	4
Olympic Games
Bronze medal – third place	2006 Turin	Individual NH
Bronze medal – third place	2006 Turin	Team LH
FIS Nordic World Ski Championships
Silver medal – second place	2005 Oberstdorf	Individual LH
Silver medal – second place	2007 Sapporo	Team LH
Bronze medal – third place	2005 Oberstdorf	Team LH
Bronze medal – third place	2007 Sapporo	Individual LH
Men's ski flying
FIS Ski Flying World Championships
Gold medal – first place	2004 Planica	Individual
Gold medal – first place	2004 Planica	Team
Gold medal – first place	2006 Bad Mitterndorf	Individual
Gold medal – first place	2006 Bad Mitterndorf	Team
- Updated on 10 February 2016

Roar Ljøkelsøy (born 31 May 1976) is a Norwegian former ski jumper who competed from 1993 to 2010, and twice finished runner up in the World Cup.

== Career ==
He won his first individual World Cup event on 25 January 2003 and was a very consistent competitor in the 2003/04 and 2004/05 seasons, finishing runner-up in both. In 2003–04 he won seven out of the last eleven competitions, finishing ten points short of eventual winner Janne Ahonen.

In addition to winning eleven individual and three team World Cup events, Ljøkelsøy won the ski jumping event at the Holmenkollen Ski Festival in 2004. He then won the individual and team gold medal at the 2004 Ski Flying World Championships in Planica.

At the 2005 Ski Jumping World Championships, Ljøkelsøy won a silver medal on the individual large hill and a bronze on the team large hill. In 2006, he retained his Ski Flying World Championship in Kulm, winning with over twenty points to the next competitor, despite feeling ill. The next day, he led the Norwegian team to victory in the team event, together with Ingebrigtsen, Romøren and Lars Bystøl.

At the 2007 Ski Jumping World Championships in Sapporo, Ljøkelsøy won silver on the team large hill and bronze on the individual large hill.

Ljøkelsøy retired from the sport after competing in the 2010 Ski Flying World Championships in Planica, with his last official jump being 193.5 metres.

== World Cup ==
=== Standings ===
Season	Overall	4H	SF	NT	JP
1992/93	53	—	—	N/A	N/A
1993/94	17	10	—	N/A	N/A
1994/95	33	65	26	N/A	N/A
1995/96	15	27	5	N/A	15
1996/97	13	13	9	24	14
1997/98	32	38	23	39	32
1998/99	29	67	44	24	27
1999/00	29	19	23	28	27
2000/01	28	20	24	68	N/A
2001/02	35	44	N/A	43	N/A
2002/03	9	6	N/A	16	N/A
2003/04	2nd place, silver medalist(s)	9	N/A	1st place, gold medalist(s)	N/A
2004/05	2nd place, silver medalist(s)	6	N/A	2nd place, silver medalist(s)	N/A
2005/06	4	3rd place, bronze medalist(s)	N/A	16	N/A
2006/07	14	17	N/A	12	N/A
2007/08	37	31	N/A	63	N/A
2008/09	25	56	19	28	N/A
2009/10	30	23	—	21	N/A

=== Wins ===
No.	Season	Date	Location	Hill	Size
1	2002/03	25 January 2003	(Japan) Sapporo	Ōkurayama K120 (night)	LH
2	2003/04	6 December 2003	(Norway) Trondheim	Granåsen K120 (night)	LH
3	2003/04	20 December 2003	(Switzerland) Engelberg	Gross-Titlis-Schanze K120	LH
4	2003/04	24 January 2004	(Japan) Sapporo	Ōkurayama K120 (night)	LH
5	2003/04	25 January 2004	(Japan) Sapporo	Ōkurayama K120	LH
6	2003/04	7 February 2004	(Germany) Oberstdorf	Heini-Klopfer-Skiflugschanze K185	FH
7	2003/04	12 March 2004	(Norway) Lillehammer	Lysgårdsbakken K120 (night)	LH
8	2003/04	14 March 2004	(Norway) Oslo	Holmenkollbakken K115	LH
9	2004/05	29 January 2005	(Poland) Zakopane	Wielka Krokiew HS134 (night)	LH
10	2004/05	6 February 2005	(Japan) Sapporo	Ōkurayama HS134	LH
11	2005/06	22 January 2006	(Japan) Sapporo	Ōkurayama HS134	LH
