= 2003–04 FIS Ski Jumping World Cup =

Ski jumping championship season

2003–04 Ski Jumping World Cup
Winners
- World Cup: (Finland) Janne Ahonen
- Four Hills Tournament: (Norway) Sigurd Pettersen
- Nordic Tournament: (Norway) Roar Ljøkelsøy
- Nations Cup: Norway
- Most World Cup wins: (Norway) Roar Ljøkelsøy (7)

Competitions
- Venues: 16
- Individual: 23
- Team: 2
- Cancelled: 5

The 2003–04 FIS Ski Jumping World Cup was the 25th World Cup season in ski jumping. It began on 28 November 2003 at Ruka in Kuusamo, Finland, and finished on 14 March 2004 at Holmenkollbakken in Oslo, Norway. The defending champion from the previous three seasons was Adam Małysz. The overall World Cup was won by Janne Ahonen, who gained his first title. Roar Ljøkelsøy placed second, with Bjørn Einar Romøren in third. The Nations Cup was won by Norway.

== Calendar ==
=== Individual events ===
Round	Venue	Discipline	Date	Winner	Second	Third	Yellow Jersey	Reference
1	(Finland) Kuusamo	K120	28 November 2003	(Finland) Matti Hautamäki	(Poland) Adam Małysz	(Finland) Veli-Matti Lindström	(Poland) Adam Małysz	
2	(Finland) Kuusamo	K120	30 November 2003	(Norway) Sigurd Pettersen	(Poland) Adam Małysz	(Finland) Veli-Matti Lindström	(Finland) Matti Hautamäki	
3	(Norway) Trondheim	K120	6 December 2003	(Norway) Roar Ljøkelsøy	(Finland) Janne Ahonen	(Germany) Maximilian Mechler	(Poland) Adam Małysz	
-	(Norway) Trondheim	K120	~~7 December 2003~~	Cancelled				
-	(Germany) Titisee-Neustadt	K120	~~13 December 2003~~	Cancelled				
4	(Germany) Titisee-Neustadt	K120	14 December 2003	(Finland) Tami Kiuru	(Austria) Andreas Widhölzl	(Finland) Janne Ahonen	(Poland) Adam Małysz	
5	(Switzerland) Engelberg	K120	20 December 2003	(Norway) Roar Ljøkelsøy	(Finland) Janne Ahonen	(Austria) Martin Höllwarth	(Poland) Adam Małysz	
-	(Switzerland) Engelberg	K120	~~21 December 2003~~	Cancelled				
Four Hills Tournament (29 December 2003 to 6 January 2004)
6	(Germany) Oberstdorf	K115	29 December 2003	(Norway) Sigurd Pettersen	(Austria) Thomas Morgenstern	(Austria) Martin Höllwarth	(Norway) Roar Ljøkelsøy	
7	(Germany) Garmisch-Partenkirchen	K115	1 January 2004	(Norway) Sigurd Pettersen	(Austria) Martin Höllwarth	(Germany) Georg Späth	(Norway) Roar Ljøkelsøy	
8	(Austria) Innsbruck	K120	4 January 2004	(Slovenia) Peter Žonta	(Finland) Veli-Matti Lindström	(Finland) Janne Ahonen	(Norway) Sigurd Pettersen	
9	(Austria) Bischofshofen	K125	6 January 2004	(Norway) Sigurd Pettersen	(Slovenia) Peter Žonta	(Finland) Janne Ahonen	(Norway) Sigurd Pettersen	
	Four Hills Tournament - Final Standings			(Norway) Sigurd Pettersen	(Austria) Martin Höllwarth	(Slovenia) Peter Žonta		
End of Four Hills Tournament
10	(Czech Republic) Liberec	K120	10 January 2004	(Finland) Janne Ahonen	(Austria) Thomas Morgenstern	(Austria) Martin Höllwarth	(Norway) Sigurd Pettersen	
11	(Czech Republic) Liberec	K120	11 January 2004	(Finland) Janne Ahonen	(Norway) Bjørn Einar Romøren	(Switzerland) Andreas Küttel	(Finland) Janne Ahonen	
12	(Poland) Zakopane	K120	17 January 2004	(Germany) Michael Uhrmann	(Poland) Adam Małysz	(Norway) Bjørn Einar Romøren	(Finland) Janne Ahonen	
13	(Poland) Zakopane	K120	18 January 2004	(Austria) Martin Höllwarth	(Poland) Adam Małysz	(Norway) Roar Ljøkelsøy	(Finland) Janne Ahonen	
-	(Japan) Hakuba	K120	~~22 January 2004~~	Cancelled, rescheduled to 23 January 2004				
14	(Japan) Hakuba	K120	23 January 2004	(Finland) Matti Hautamäki	(Finland) Janne Ahonen	(Norway) Bjørn Einar Romøren	(Finland) Janne Ahonen	
15	(Japan) Sapporo	K120	24 January 2004	(Norway) Roar Ljøkelsøy	(Finland) Janne Ahonen	(Austria) Martin Höllwarth	(Finland) Janne Ahonen	
16	(Japan) Sapporo	K120	25 January 2004	(Norway) Roar Ljøkelsøy	(Japan) Noriaki Kasai	(Finland) Janne Ahonen	(Finland) Janne Ahonen	
17	(Germany) Oberstdorf	K185	7 February 2004	(Norway) Roar Ljøkelsøy	(Finland) Janne Ahonen	(Japan) Noriaki Kasai	(Finland) Janne Ahonen	
-	(Germany) Oberstdorf	K185	~~8 February 2004~~	Cancelled				
18	(Germany) Willingen	K130	14 February 2004	(Finland) Janne Ahonen	(Germany) Georg Späth	(Norway) Roar Ljøkelsøy	(Finland) Janne Ahonen	
FIS Ski-Flying World Championships 2004 (20 February to 22 February 2004)
19	(United States) Park City	K120	28 February 2004	(Japan) Noriaki Kasai	(Switzerland) Simon Ammann	(Norway) Tommy Ingebrigtsen	(Finland) Janne Ahonen	
-	(United States) Park City	K120	~~29 February 2004~~	Cancelled				
Nordic Tournament (29 December 2003 to 6 January 2004)
20	(Finland) Lahti	K116	7 March 2004	(Norway) Bjørn Einar Romøren	(Norway) Roar Ljøkelsøy	(Finland) Janne Ahonen	(Finland) Janne Ahonen	
21	(Finland) Kuopio	K120	10 March 2004	(Norway) Bjørn Einar Romøren	(Norway) Roar Ljøkelsøy	(Germany) Alexander Herr	(Finland) Janne Ahonen	
22	(Norway) Lillehammer	K120	12 March 2004	(Norway) Roar Ljøkelsøy	(Norway) Bjørn Einar Romøren	(Switzerland) Simon Ammann	(Finland) Janne Ahonen	
23	(Norway) Oslo	K115	14 March 2004	(Norway) Roar Ljøkelsøy	(Switzerland) Simon Ammann	(Norway) Bjørn Einar Romøren	(Finland) Janne Ahonen	
	Nordic Tournament - Final Standings			(Norway) Roar Ljøkelsøy	(Norway) Bjørn Einar Romøren	(Switzerland) Simon Ammann		
End of Nordic Tournament

=== Team events ===
Round	Venue	Discipline	Date	Winner	Second	Third	Reference
1	(Germany) Willingen	K130 Team	15 February 2004	Norway; Tommy Ingebrigtsen; Sigurd Pettersen; Bjørn Einar Romøren; Roar Ljøkelsøy	Finland; Tami Kiuru; Matti Hautamäki; Jussi Hautamäki; Janne Ahonen	Germany; Michael Uhrmann; Martin Schmitt; Alexander Herr; Georg Späth	
2	(Finland) Lahti	K116 Team	6 March 2004	Norway; Bjørn Einar Romøren; Sigurd Pettersen; Tommy Ingebrigtsen; Roar Ljøkelsøy	Finland; Tami Kiuru; Akseli Kokkonen; Matti Hautamäki; Janne Ahonen	Japan; Akira Higashi; Daiki Ito; Hideharu Miyahira; Noriaki Kasai	

== World Cup Standings ==
=== Overall ===
Pos	Athlete	Points
1.	(Finland) Janne Ahonen	1316
2.	(Norway) Roar Ljøkelsøy	1306
3.	(Norway) Bjørn Einar Romøren	825
4.	(Norway) Sigurd Pettersen	787
5.	(Austria) Martin Höllwarth	731
6.	(Austria) Thomas Morgenstern	696
7.	(Finland) Matti Hautamäki	673
8.	(Japan) Noriaki Kasai	631
9.	(Germany) Georg Späth	557
10.	(Slovenia) Peter Žonta	545

Pos	Athlete	Points
11.	(Norway) Tommy Ingebrigtsen	526
12.	(Poland) Adam Małysz	525
13.	(Switzerland) Simon Ammann	511
14.	(Germany) Michael Uhrmann	501
15.	(Finland) Veli-Matti Lindström	476
16.	(Finland) Tami Kiuru	411
17.	(Slovenia) Rok Benkovič	343
18.	(Austria) Andreas Goldberger	299
19.	(Finland) Akseli Kokkonen	280
20.	(Germany) Martin Schmitt	276

Pos	Athlete	Points
21.	(Norway) Lars Bystøl	263
21.	(Austria) Andreas Kofler	263
23.	(Switzerland) Andreas Küttel	258
24.	(Germany) Sven Hannawald	253
25.	(Japan) Akira Higashi	250
26.	(Germany) Alexander Herr	241
27.	(Germany) Maximilian Mechler	209
28.	(Austria) Wolfgang Loitzl	206
29.	(Austria) Andreas Widhölzl	192
30.	(Norway) Morten Solem	172

=== Nations Cup ===
Pos	Nation	Points
1.	Norway	5007
2.	Finland	4042
3	Austria	2983
4.	Germany	2777
5.	Japan	1842
6.	Slovenia	1393
7.	Switzerland	769
8.	Poland	702
9.	France	249
10.	Sweden	136

== Medal table ==
Rank	Nation	Gold	Silver	Bronze	Total
1	Norway	15	4	6	25
2	Finland	6	8	7	21
3	Austria	1	4	4	9
4	Germany	1	1	4	6
5	Japan	1	1	2	4
6	Slovenia	1	1	0	2
7	Poland	0	4	0	4
8	Switzerland	0	2	2	4
Totals (8 entries)		25	25	25	75
