= Bjørn Einar Romøren =

Norwegian former ski jumper (born 1981)

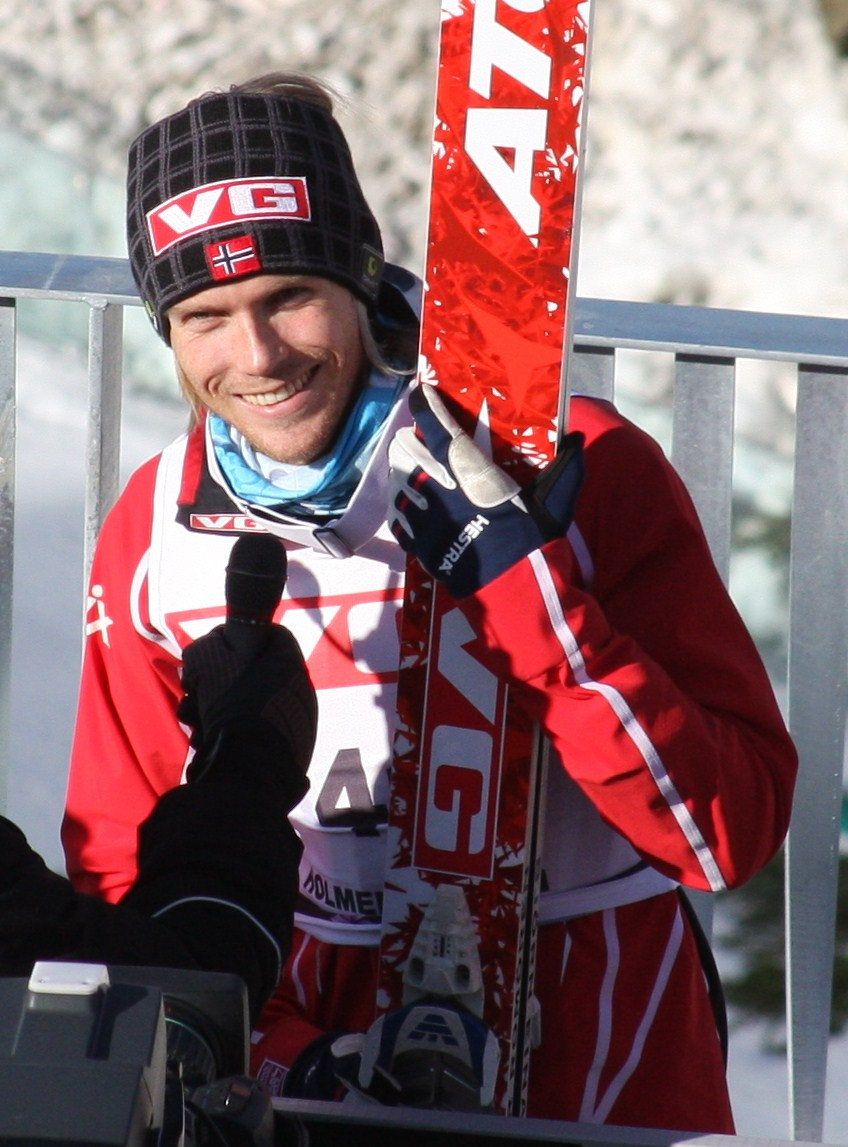
- Romøren in Oslo, 2010

Personal information
- Nationality: Norway
- Born: 1 April 1981 (age 45) Oslo, Norway
- Height: 1.82 m (5 ft 11 1/2 in)

Sport
- Sport: Skiing

World Cup career
- Seasons: 2001–2012; 2014
- Indiv. starts: 221
- Indiv. podiums: 22
- Indiv. wins: 8
- Team starts: 43
- Team podiums: 17
- Team wins: 7

Achievements and titles
- Personal bests: 239 m (784 ft); Planica, 20 March 2005
Medal record
Men's ski jumping
Olympic Games
Bronze medal – third place	2006 Turin	Team LH
FIS Nordic World Ski Championships
Silver medal – second place	2011 Oslo	Team NH
Bronze medal – third place	2003 Val di Fiemme	Team NH
Bronze medal – third place	2005 Oberstdorf	Team LH
Men's ski flying
FIS Ski Flying World Championships
Gold medal – first place	2004 Planica	Team
Gold medal – first place	2006 Bad Mitterndorf	Team
Silver medal – second place	2010 Planica	Team
Bronze medal – third place	2008 Oberstdorf	Team
- Updated on 10 February 2016

Bjørn Einar Romøren (born 1 April 1981) is a Norwegian former ski jumper who competed at World Cup level from 2001 to 2014. His career highlights include eight individual World Cup wins, two ski flying world records, and a team bronze medal at the 2006 Winter Olympics. Bjørn Einar is the younger brother of Jan-Erik Romøren, best known by the stage name Nag, frontman of black metal band Tsjuder.

== Career ==
Romøren achieved his first World Cup victory in Bischofshofen during the 2002–03 Four Hills Tournament. He later won several more World Cup competitions as well as two World Championship bronze medals in the team large hill event in Val di Fiemme (2003) and Oberstdorf (2005). At the 2006 Winter Olympics in Pragelato, Romøren won a bronze medal in the team large hill event. He also has four medals in the team event at the Ski Flying World Championships with two golds (Planica in 2004; Kulm in 2006), one silver (Planica in 2010), and a bronze (Oberstdorf 2008).

On 20 March 2005, in Planica, Romøren set the world record for the sport's longest jump with a distance of 234.5 Meters which he later improved to 239 m on the same day. This record stood until 11 February 2011 (during which countryman Johan Remen Evensen jumped 243 m in Vikersund), but his 239 m jump remained the hill record at Planica until 20 March 2015, exactly a decade to the day.

== World Cup ==
=== Standings ===
Season	Overall	4H	SF	NT
2000/01	—	—	—	38
2001/02	—	—	N/A	61
2002/03	14	19	N/A	27
2003/04	3rd place, bronze medalist(s)	13	N/A	2nd place, silver medalist(s)
2004/05	14	44	N/A	9
2005/06	6	7	N/A	7
2006/07	29	31	N/A	—
2007/08	11	19	N/A	11
2008/09	34	67	26	—
2009/10	9	17	20	35
2010/11	17	14	14	N/A
2011/12	32	40	15	N/A
2013/14	74	—	—	N/A

=== Wins ===
No.	Season	Date	Location	Hill	Size
1	2002/03	6 January 2003	(Austria) Bischofshofen	Paul-Ausserleitner-Schanze K120	LH
2	2003/04	7 March 2004	(Finland) Lahti	Salpausselkä K116	LH
3	2003/04	10 March 2004	(Finland) Kuopio	Puijo K120 (night)	LH
4	2004/05	20 March 2005	(Slovenia) Planica	Letalnica bratov Gorišek HS215	FH
5	2005/06	21 January 2006	(Japan) Sapporo	Ōkurayama HS134 (night)	LH
6	2005/06	18 March 2006	(Slovenia) Planica	Letalnica bratov Gorišek HS215	FH
7	2007/08	17 February 2008	(Germany) Willingen	Mühlenkopfschanze HS145	LH
8	2009/10	28 November 2009	(Finland) Kuusamo	Rukatunturi HS142 (night)	LH

== Ski jumping world records ==
Date	Hill	Location	Metres	Feet
20 March 2005	Letalnica bratov Gorišek HS215	Planica, Slovenia	234.5	769
20 March 2005	Letalnica bratov Gorišek HS215	Planica, Slovenia	239	784

Records
Preceded by Tommy Ingebrigtsen; 231 m (758 ft)	World's longest ski jump 234.5 m (769 ft); 20 March 2005 – 20 March 2005	Succeeded by Matti Hautamäki; 235.5 m (773 ft)
Preceded by Matti Hautamäki; 235.5 m (773 ft)	World's longest ski jump 239 m (784 ft); 20 March 2005 – 11 February 2011	Succeeded by Johan Remen Evensen; 243 m (797 ft)
