= Urban Franc =

Slovenian ski jumper

Medal record

Men's Ski flying

World Championships
Bronze medal – third place	1996 Bad Mitterndorf	Individual

Urban Franc (born 5 June 1975 in Kranj) is a Slovenian former ski jumper who competed from 1992 to 1999. He won a bronze medal in the individual event at the FIS Ski-Flying World Championships 1996 in Bad Mitterndorf.

Franc finished 42nd in the individual normal hill event at the 1998 Winter Olympics in Nagano. His best finish at the FIS Nordic World Ski Championships was 27th in the individual large hill event at Thunder Bay, Ontario in 1995. His best World Cup finish was second in the individual large hill event in Sweden in 1992.
