= Veikko Heinonen =

Finnish ski jumper

Medal record

Men's ski jumping

Representing Finland

World Championships
Silver medal – second place	1954 Falun	Individual large hill

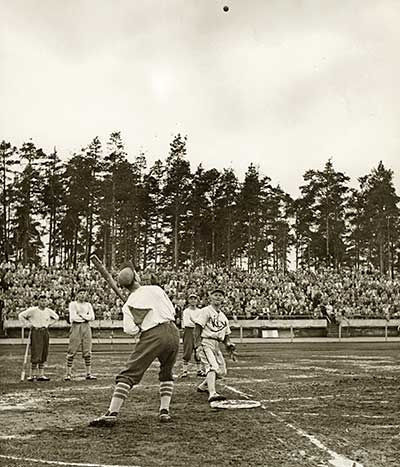
Playing baseball in 1958

Veikko Heinonen (4 October 1934 – 4 November 2015) was a Finnish former ski jumper who competed in the 1950s, winning a silver medal at the 1954 FIS Nordic World Ski Championships on the large hill in Falun.

He was also a baseball player.

He was born in Lahti in 1934, and died in 2015.
