= Karel Kodejška =

Czech former ski jumper (born 1947)

Medal record

Men's ski flying

World Championships
Gold medal – first place	1975 Bad Mitterndorf	Individual
Bronze medal – third place	1973 Oberstdorf	Individual

Karel Kodejška (born 20 March 1947, in Lomnice nad Popelkou) is a Czech former ski jumper who competed from 1969 to 1976. He won two medals at the FIS Ski Flying World Championships with a gold in 1975 and a bronze in 1973.

Kodejška also competed in two Winter Olympics, earning his best finish of tied for seventh in the individual normal hill event at Sapporo in 1972. He also finished sixth in the individual normal hill event at the FIS Nordic World Ski Championships 1974 in Falun.

In 1975 he won the Sportsperson of the Year award in Czechoslovakia.
