= Andreas Arén =

Swedish ski jumper

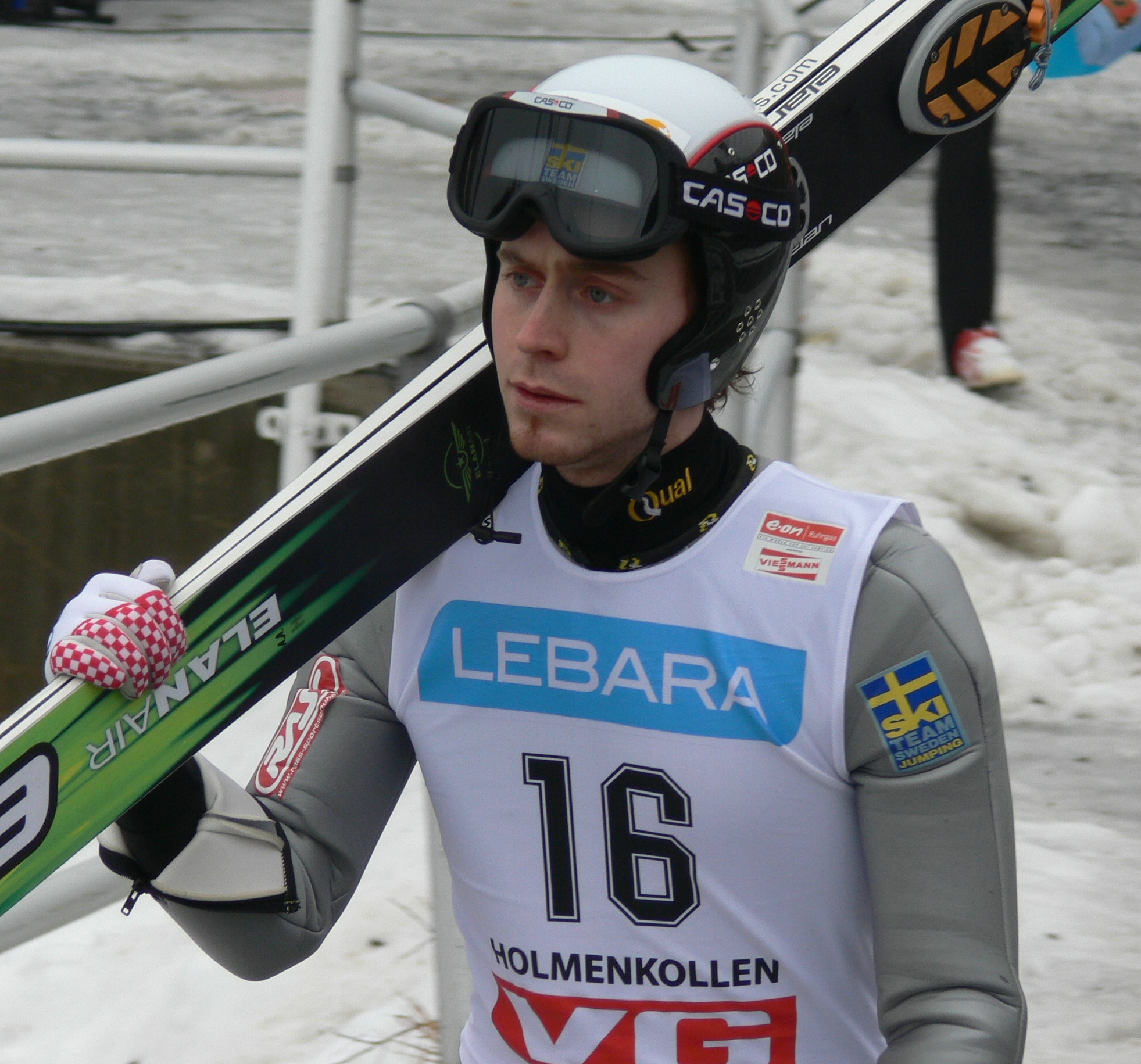
Andreas Arén at World Cup (2008)

Andreas Arén (born 28 November 1985) is a Swedish ski jumper who has competed since 2003.

== Career ==
Born in Falun, Aren made his debut during the Ski Jumping World Cup meeting in Lahti. He finished in the 67th position and he didn't gain a single point. In the next season he didn't participate in the World Cup. In the next year he participated in Continental Cup. In February he reached a second position in the Swedish Championship.

During the Summer Grand Prix season his best performance was a 47th position in Kranj, on August 24, 2006. He also started in Oberhof, on October 3 but he was disqualified. In the 2006/07 Ski Jumping World Cup he reached the 17th position in Kuusamo on November 24, – which was his personal best – so he gained 14 points in the World Cup Overall classification.
