= Roy Sherwood =

American ski jumper

Roy Sherwood (11 June 1932 in Salisbury, Connecticut – 19 October 2017) was an American former ski jumper who competed in the 1956 Winter Olympics. After his career, he worked as a referee for ski jumping competitions. In 2008 he was inducted into the American Ski Jumping Hall of Fame.
