= Lars Bystøl =

Norwegian ski jumper

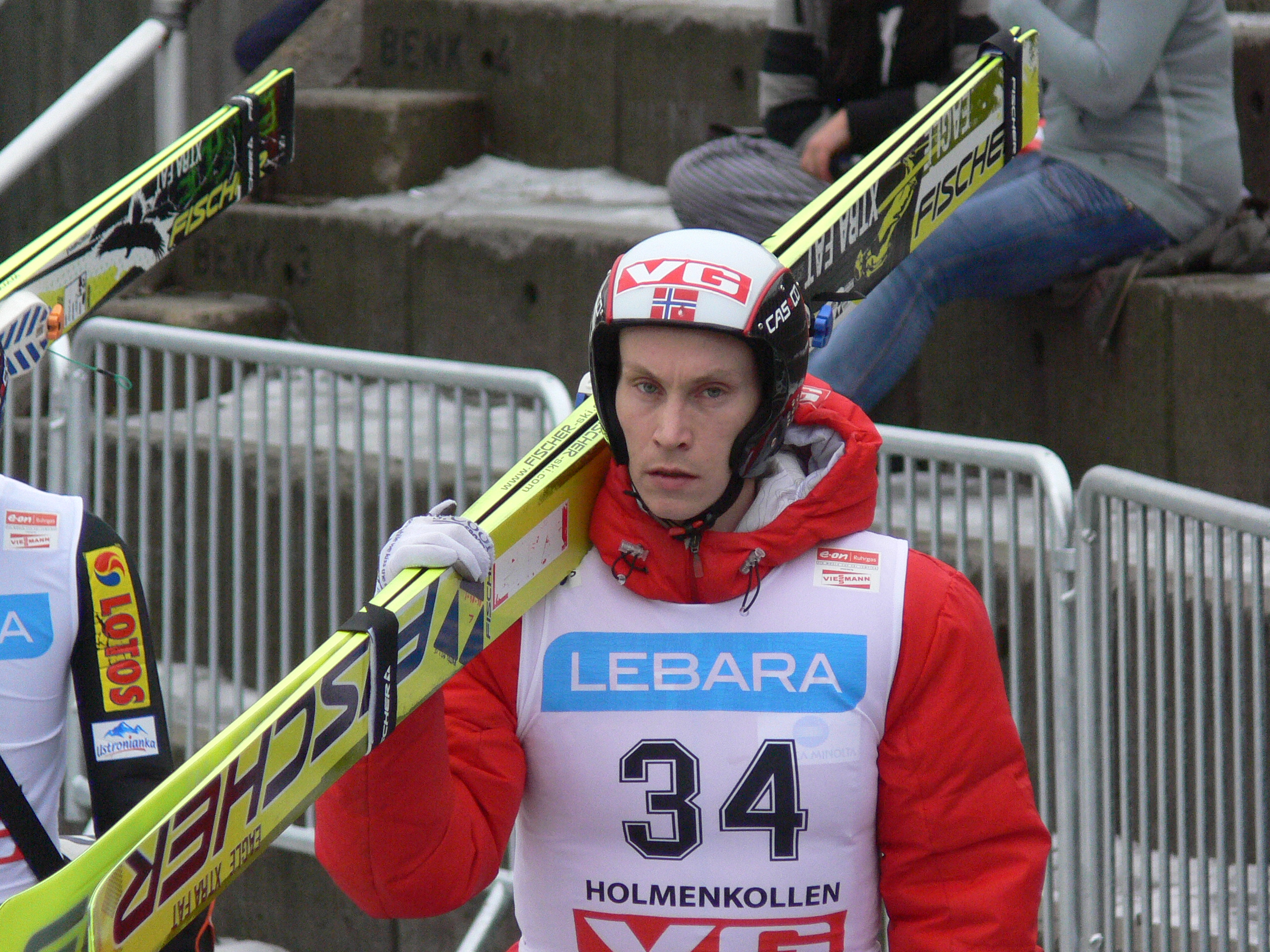
- Bystøl in Oslo, 2008

Personal information
- Full name: Lars Kristian Bystøl
- Nationality: Norway
- Born: 4 December 1978 (age 47) Voss Municipality, Norway
- Height: 1.79 m (5 ft 10 in)

Sport
- Sport: Skiing

World Cup career
- Seasons: 2002–2008
- Indiv. starts: 102
- Indiv. podiums: 4
- Indiv. wins: 1
- Team starts: 4
- Team podiums: 2

Achievements and titles
- Personal bests: 216.5 m (710 ft); Planica, 20 March 2005
Medal record
Men's ski jumping
Olympic Games
Gold medal – first place	2006 Turin	Individual NH
Bronze medal – third place	2006 Turin	Individual LH
Bronze medal – third place	2006 Turin	Team LH
World Championships
Bronze medal – third place	2003 Val di Fiemme	Team LH
Bronze medal – third place	2005 Oberstdorf	Team LH
Men's ski flying
World Championships
Gold medal – first place	2006 Bad Mitterndorf	Team
- Updated on 10 February 2016

Lars Kristian Bystøl (born 4 December 1978) is a Norwegian former ski jumper who competed from 2002 to 2008. His career highlights include an individual gold medal at the 2006 Winter Olympics, one individual World Cup victory, a gold medal in the Ski Flying World Championships, and two World Championship bronze medals in team competitions.

== Career ==
Bystøl won his first and only World Cup event on 4 January 2006, by winning the third event of the 2005–06 Four Hills Tournament in Innsbruck. Eleven days later, Bystøl won a gold medal in the team event at the 2006 Ski Flying World Championships in Bad Mitterndorf.

He continued the World Cup season by placing between 10th and 20th in the next three individual events, before going to the 2006 Winter Olympics. He retained his top 15 position in the World Cup standings, which enabled him to qualify for the normal hill of the Olympics despite being disqualified in the qualifying run. Once there, he finished sixth in the first jump, but held on with a 103.5 metre second jump to win Olympic gold.

Bystøl finished 13th overall in the 2005/06 World Cup standings.

== World Cup ==
=== Standings ===
Season	Overall	4H	NT
2001/02	65	—	46
2002/03	26	22	54
2003/04	21	10	22
2004/05	10	18	4
2005/06	13	16	13
2006/07	76	58	63
2007/08	37	—	18

=== Wins ===
No.	Season	Date	Location	Hill	Size
1	2005/06	4 January 2006	(Austria) Innsbruck	Bergiselschanze HS130	LH

== Substance abuse ==
In 2000, he was sent home from a Continental Cup competition in Innsbruck after a party on New Year's Eve. Later that year he was caught DUI with a 2.38‰ blood alcohol content. He was sentenced to 24 days in prison. In 2003, after some heavy drinking, he fell into the ocean during a fight. Bystøl's alcoholism became so bad that it caused him to be kicked off the national ski jumping team in 2004, though he later managed to reclaim his spot on the team.

In early 2009, he admitted to having tested positive for tetrahydrocannabinol, a derivative of cannabis. The sample was delivered in November 2008 in a Norwegian Cup race in Vikersund.
