= Akseli Kokkonen =

Finnish-Norwegian ski jumper (born 1984)

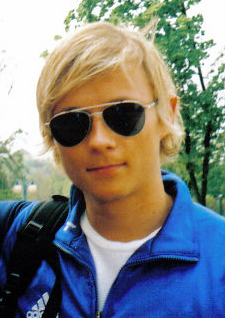
- Kokkonen in 2007

Personal information
- Full name: Akseli Ensio Kokkonen
- Nationality: (Finland) Finnish (Norway) Norwegian
- Born: 27 February 1984 (age 42) Oslo, Norway
- Height: 1.72 m (5 ft 8 in)

Sport
- Sport: Skiing

World Cup career
- Seasons: 2001–2005, 2010

Achievements and titles
- Personal bests: 213.5 m (700 ft); Planica, March 2004
- Updated on 26 March 2015

Akseli Ensio "Axu" Kokkonen (born 27 February 1984) is a Norwegian former ski jumper who competed from 2001 to 2010. He originally had Finnish nationality, but from the 2009/10 World Cup season onwards he represented Norway.
