= Tami Kiuru =

Finnish ski jumper

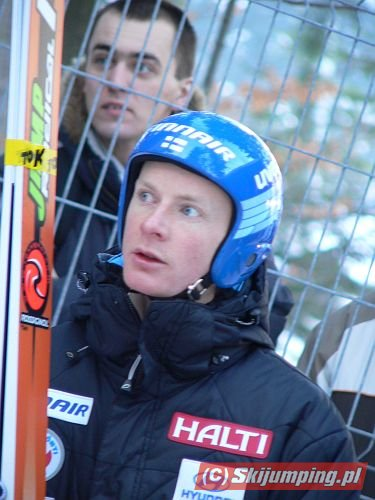
- Kiuru in Zakopane, 2006

Personal information
- Full name: Tami Petri Antero Kiuru
- Nationality: Finland
- Born: 13 September 1976 (age 49) Vantaa, Finland
- Height: 183 cm (6 ft 0 in)

Sport
- Sport: Skiing

World Cup career
- Seasons: 1993; 1999–2009
- Indiv. starts: 152
- Indiv. podiums: 3
- Indiv. wins: 1
- Team starts: 11
- Team podiums: 9
- Team wins: 3

Achievements and titles
- Personal bests: 221.5 m (727 ft); Planica, 22 February 2004
Medal record
Men's ski jumping
Olympic Games
Silver medal – second place	2006 Turin	Team LH
FIS Nordic World Ski Championships
Gold medal – first place	2003 Val di Fiemme	Team LH
Silver medal – second place	2005 Oberstdorf	Team LH
Men's ski flying
World Championships
Silver medal – second place	2004 Planica	Team
Silver medal – second place	2006 Bad Mitterndorf	Team
Bronze medal – third place	2004 Planica	Individual
- Updated on 10 February 2016

Tami Petri Antero Kiuru (born 13 September 1976) is a Finnish former ski jumper.

== Career ==
Kiuru won a gold medal in the team large hill event at the 2003 FIS Nordic World Ski Championships. At the 2004 Ski Flying World Championships, he won bronze in the individual competition and silver in the team competition, as well as silver in the team competition at the 2006 event.

Kiuru had problems getting used to the new 'weight index' rule that was introduced for the 2003/04 season. At first, he gained weight to get permission to use longer skis, but later decided to slim back down in order to use shorter skis.

He also won a silver medal in the team large hill event at the FIS Nordic World Ski Championships 2005.

Kiuru proved that he is still in good condition by winning the Finnish Championship gold medal in the Individual Large Hill competition. He also won a silver medal in the team large hill event at the 2006 Winter Olympics in Turin.

== World Cup ==
=== Standings ===
Season	Overall	4H	SF	NT	JP
1992/93	—	—	—	N/A	N/A
1998/99	47	—	—	35	46
1999/00	37	—	25	19	36
2000/01	38	—	13	37	N/A
2001/02	37	28	N/A	—	N/A
2002/03	21	26	N/A	3rd place, bronze medalist(s)	N/A
2003/04	16	22	N/A	6	N/A
2004/05	33	27	N/A	33	N/A
2005/06	20	30	N/A	12	N/A
2006/07	40	—	N/A	11	N/A
2007/08	—	—	N/A	52	N/A
2008/09	64	—	—	—	N/A

=== Wins ===
No.	Season	Date	Location	Hill	Size
1	2003/04	14 December 2003	(Germany) Titisee-Neustadt	Hochfirstschanze K120	LH
