= FIS Ski Flying World Championships 1975 =

1975 edition of the FIS Ski-Flying World Championships

The FIS Ski Flying World Championships 1975 took place in Bad Mitterndorf, Austria between 14–16 March 1975.

== Individual ==
Medal	Athlete	Points
Gold	Karel Kodejška (TCH)	512.5
Silver	Rainer Schmidt (GDR)	505.0
Bronze	Karl Schnabl (AUT)	503.5

== Medal table ==
Rank	Nation	Gold	Silver	Bronze	Total
1	Czechoslovakia (TCH)	1	0	0	1
2	East Germany (GDR)	0	1	0	1
3	Austria (AUT)	0	0	1	1
Totals (3 entries)		1	1	1	3
