= Alexander Herr =

German ski jumper

Medal record

Representing Germany

Men's ski jumping

World Championships
Gold medal – first place	2001 Lahti	Team large hill
Bronze medal – third place	2001 Lahti	Team normal hill

Men's ski flying

World Championships
Bronze medal – third place	2006 Bad Mitterndorf	Team

Alexander Herr (born 4 October 1978 in Furtwangen im Schwarzwald, Baden-Württemberg) is a German former ski jumper who competed 1993 to 2006, then came out of retirement in 2009 to compete in the 2010 Winter Olympics. He won a bronze medal in the normal at the Junior World Ski Championships in Harrachov in 1993 and won two medals at the 2001 FIS Nordic World Ski Championships in Lahti with a gold in the team large hill and a bronze in the team normal hill events. He also finished third in the team event at the FIS Ski-Flying World Championships 2006 (15 January).

Herr's best individual finish was 2nd in the large hill in Kuusamo (Finland) on 27 November 2004. On 8 January 2005 he was victorious in the team large hill World Cup jumping at Willingen. In 1997-98, Herr won the Ski jumping Continental Cup.

At the 2006 Winter Olympics, Herr finished 21st on 12 February in the normal hill, but he quit the German team after not being chosen for the large hill event to be held in the evening of 18 February. In 2006/07, Herr planned to compete for the Swedish ski jumping team, but he did not receive the naturalization he had planned for in Scandinavia. So he wrote a letter to the trainer of the Polish ski jumping team expressing his desire to compete for them (it had been possible to gain Polish citizenship because having a Polish mother), but at last, he didn't compete for Poland, and in 2007 he did announce to retire for ever. But on 3 June 2009 it was told that he wished to start again for the German team from 2009-10, his goal was to compete in the Winter Olympics at Vancouver. But he wasn't able to qualify for the Ski jumping Continental Cup.
