= Matti Hautamäki =

Finnish ski jumper

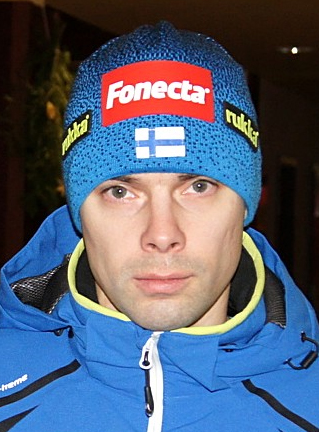
- Hautamäki in 2011

Personal information
- Full name: Matti Antero Hautamäki
- Nationality: Finland
- Born: 14 July 1981 (age 45) Oulu, Finland
- Height: 1.77 m (5 ft 10 in)

Sport
- Sport: Skiing

World Cup career
- Seasons: 1998–2012
- Indiv. starts: 289
- Indiv. podiums: 38
- Indiv. wins: 16
- Team starts: 37
- Team podiums: 24
- Team wins: 7
- Nordic titles: 2 (2002, 2005)

Achievements and titles
- Personal bests: 235.5 m (773 ft); Planica, 20 March 2005
Medal record
Men's ski jumping
Olympic Games
Silver medal – second place	2002 Salt Lake City	Team LH
Silver medal – second place	2006 Turin	Individual NH
Silver medal – second place	2006 Turin	Team LH
Bronze medal – third place	2002 Salt Lake City	Individual LH
Ski Jumping World Championships
Gold medal – first place	2003 Val di Fiemme	Team LH
Silver medal – second place	2001 Lahti	Team NH
Silver medal – second place	2003 Val di Fiemme	Individual LH
Silver medal – second place	2005 Oberstdorf	Team LH
Men's ski flying
Ski Flying World Championships
Silver medal – second place	2004 Planica	Team
Silver medal – second place	2006 Tauplitz	Team
Silver medal – second place	2008 Oberstdorf	Team
Bronze medal – third place	2002 Harrachov	Individual
Bronze medal – third place	2010 Planica	Team
- Updated on 10 February 2016

Matti Antero Hautamäki (Finnish pronunciation: [ˈmɑtːi ˈɑntero ˈhɑu̯tɑmæki]; born 14 July 1981) is a Finnish former ski jumper who competed from 1997 to 2012. He is one of Finland's most successful ski jumpers, having won sixteen individual World Cup competitions; multiple medals at the Winter Olympics, Ski Jumping World Championships and Ski Flying World Championships; the Nordic Tournament twice; and four ski flying world records.

== Career ==
=== Ski jumping ===
Hautamäki started ski jumping at the age of seven near his hometown of Oulu. When his older brother Jussi and friend Lauri Hakola moved to Kuopio, Matti joined them. At first, he found it difficult to be independent at the age of sixteen, but he received much help and support from his brother, with whom he was living at the time. The help of his new coach Pekka Niemelä, whom he met at the sports school in Kuopio, also helped him advance quickly. In the same year, Matti had his first real successes and won medals at the 1997 and 1999 FIS Junior World Ski Jumping Championships.

At the Four Hills Tournament in 2001/02, Hautamäki finished second, his highest ever place in that tournament. In 2002 and 2005, he won the Nordic Tournament, with a clean sweep of all four events in the latter. It was during the 2004–05 season that he won six individual events in a row, including the pre-Winter Olympics rehearsal in Pragelato, and the first ski flying event in Planica; this matched the record for the most consecutive victories set by countryman Janne Ahonen in the same season. Hautamäki also won the ski jumping event at the 2005 Holmenkollen Ski Festival in Oslo.

=== Ski flying ===
Hautamäki was regarded as a specialist at ski flying, with the majority of his personal best distances being achieved in Planica. An early sign of things to come was showcased on 23 March 2002 when he jumped 224.5 metres, nearly equalling the then-world record of 225 m set two years prior by Andreas Goldberger. At the 20–23 March 2003 event, Hautamäki set three consecutive world records of 227.5 m (746 ft), 228.5 m (750 ft), and 231 m (758 ft); the latter making him the first to ever officially land a jump over 230 m. His record stood until 20 March 2005, a day on which it was equalled once by Tommy Ingebrigtsen and later broken a further three times in spectacular fashion: Bjørn Einar Romøren first jumped 234.5 m (769 ft) during the morning training round, followed by Hautamäki momentarily reclaiming the record with 235.5 m (773 ft) in the afternoon event. This was then shattered again by Romøren only minutes later, who jumped 239 m (784 ft). Some minutes after that, Janne Ahonen jumped 240 m (790 ft), but this was rendered invalid due to his falling hard upon landing.

== World Cup ==
=== Standings ===
Season	Overall	4H	SF	NT	JP
1997/98	39	44	—	33	37
1998/99	101	—	—	—	99
1999/00	17	15	27	16	16
2000/01	6	6	4	11	N/A
2001/02	3rd place, bronze medalist(s)	2nd place, silver medalist(s)	N/A	1st place, gold medalist(s)	N/A
2002/03	8	17	N/A	2nd place, silver medalist(s)	N/A
2003/04	7	23	N/A	11	N/A
2004/05	3rd place, bronze medalist(s)	10	N/A	1st place, gold medalist(s)	N/A
2005/06	11	5	N/A	11	N/A
2006/07	9	20	N/A	7	N/A
2007/08	19	13	N/A	14	N/A
2008/09	12	9	9	10	N/A
2009/10	27	37	15	22	N/A
2010/11	8	7	10	N/A	N/A
2011/12	49	35	—	N/A	N/A

=== Wins ===
No.	Season	Date	Location	Hill	Size
1	2000/01	2 December 2000	(Finland) Kuopio	Puijo K120 (night)	LH
2	2001/02	19 January 2002	(Poland) Zakopane	Wielka Krokiew K116	LH
3	2001/02	13 March 2002	(Sweden) Falun	Lugnet K115 (night)	LH
4	2001/02	15 March 2002	(Norway) Trondheim	Granåsen K120 (night)	LH
5	2002/03	22 March 2003	(Slovenia) Planica	Velikanka bratov Gorišek K185	FH
6	2002/03	23 March 2003	(Slovenia) Planica	Velikanka bratov Gorišek K185	FH
7	2003/04	28 November 2003	(Finland) Kuusamo	Rukatunturi K120 (night)	LH
8	2003/04	23 January 2004	(Japan) Hakuba	Hakuba K120 (night)	LH
9	2004/05	11 February 2005	(Italy) Pragelato	Stadio del Trampolino HS140	LH
10	2004/05	6 March 2005	(Finland) Lahti	Salpausselkä HS130	LH
11	2004/05	9 March 2005	(Finland) Kuopio	Puijo HS127 (night)	LH
12	2004/05	11 March 2005	(Norway) Lillehammer	Lysgårdsbakken HS138 (night)	LH
13	2004/05	13 March 2005	(Norway) Oslo	Holmenkollbakken HS128	LH
14	2004/05	19 March 2005	(Slovenia) Planica	Letalnica bratov Gorišek HS215	FH
15	2005/06	28 January 2006	(Poland) Zakopane	Wielka Krokiew HS134 (night)	LH
16	2005/06	29 January 2006	(Poland) Zakopane	Wielka Krokiew HS134	LH

== Ski jumping world records ==
Date	Hill	Location	Metres	Feet
20 March 2003	Velikanka bratov Gorišek K185	Planica, Slovenia	227.5	746
22 March 2003	Velikanka bratov Gorišek K185	Planica, Slovenia	228.5	750
23 March 2003	Velikanka bratov Gorišek K185	Planica, Slovenia	231	758
20 March 2005	Letalnica bratov Gorišek HS215	Planica, Slovenia	235.5	773

Records
Preceded by Adam Małysz	World's longest ski jump 231 m (758 ft); 20 March 2003 – 20 March 2005	Succeeded by Tommy Ingebrigtsen
Preceded by Bjørn Einar Romøren	World's longest ski jump 235.5 m (773 ft); 20 March 2005	Succeeded by Bjørn Einar Romøren
