= Georg Späth =

German ski jumper

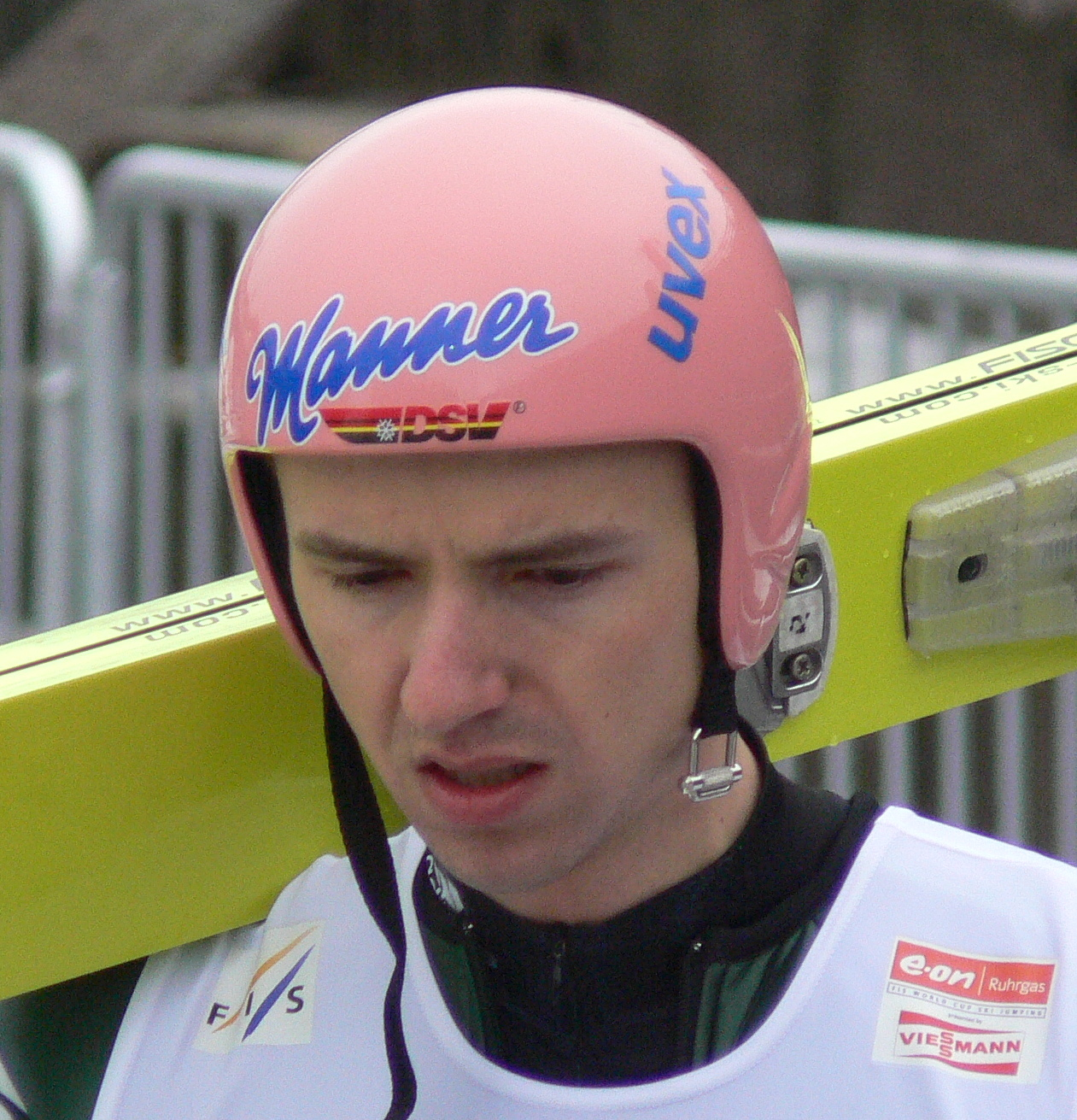
- Späth in Oslo, 2008

Personal information
- Full name: Georg Späth
- Nationality: Germany
- Born: 24 February 1981 (age 45) Oberstdorf, West Germany

Sport
- Sport: Skiing
- Club: SC Oberstdorf

World Cup career
- Seasons: 1998; 2001–2010
- Indiv. podiums: 4
- Team podiums: 3
- Team wins: 1

Achievements and titles
- Personal bests: 225 m (738 ft); Planica, 20 Feb 2004
Medal record
Men's ski jumping
World Championships
| Silver medal – second place | 2005 Oberstdorf | Team normal hill |
Men's ski flying
World Championships
| Bronze medal – third place | 2006 Bad Mitterndorf | Team |
- Updated on 15 May 2015

Georg Späth (born 24 February 1981) is a German former ski jumper who competed from 1998 to 2013. He won a silver medal on the normal hill team event at the 2005 FIS Nordic World Ski Championships in Oberstdorf and finished fifth on the individual normal hill at those same championships.

Späth won a bronze medal in the team event at the 2006 FIS Ski Flying World Championships. His best individual finish at the Winter Olympics was 12th on the individual normal hill in Pragelato in 2006.
