= Bad Mitterndorf =

- Municipality
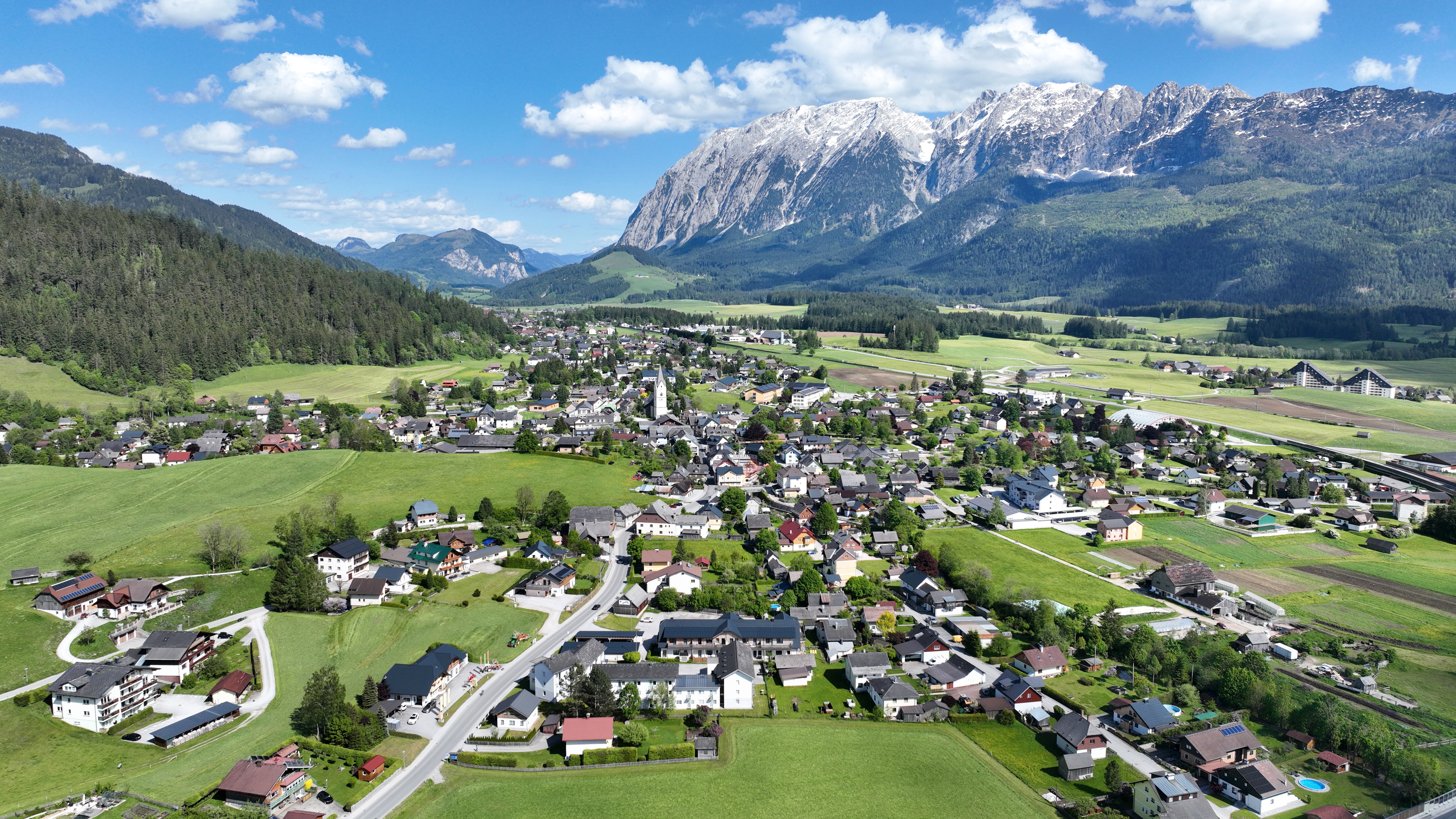
- Bad Mitterndorf in 2025 with Grimming in the background

- Coat of arms

- Location within Austria
- Coordinates: 47°33′18″N 13°55′45″E
- Country: Austria
- State: Styria
- District: Liezen

Government
  - Mayor: Klaus Neuper (SPÖ)

Area
  - Total: 196.17 km^{2} (75.74 sq mi)
- Elevation: 809 m (2,654 ft)

Population (2018-01-01)
  - Total: 4,962
  - Density: 25.29/km^{2} (65.51/sq mi)
- Time zone: UTC+1 (CET)
  - Summer (DST): UTC+2 (CEST)
- Postal code: 8983
- Area code: 03623
- Vehicle registration: LI
- Website: gemeinde.bad-mitterndorf.at

Bad Mitterndorf (German: [baːt ˈmiteʁnˌdɔʁf]) is a town in Salzkammergut in the Austrian state of Styria.

Situated between Salzburg and Graz, it is a popular winter sports resort and also as a location for walking and cycling in the summer. Bad Mitterndorf is the site of two health spas with thermal baths, an outdoor swimming pool and other health amenities, cafés and leisure areas. The town hosts a children's club during the holidays. Bad Mitterndorf is also the location of one of the world's five ski flying hills, Kulm. The town is well placed for excursions to Hallstatt, Altaussee and its May narcissus festival, Bad Ischl and the Kaiservilla, and to Salzburg, 95 km away.

== Population ==
Historical population
Year	Pop.	±%
1971	2,705	—
1981	2,848	+5.3%
1991	3,035	+6.6%
2001	3,218	+6.0%

== Personalities ==
Famous residents include the ski jumpers Hubert Neuper (1980 Olympic silver medallist and 1982 World Championship runner-up) and Wolfgang Loitzl (2009 World Champion and the 2008-9 Four Hills champion). Bad Mitterndorf is also the home town of Thomas Neuwirth a.k.a. Conchita Wurst, winner of the Eurovision Song Contest 2014.
