= Ski jumping at the 1998 Winter Olympics – Large hill team =

Men's large hill team at the XVIII Olympic Winter Games
- Venue: Hakuba Ski Jumping Stadium
- Dates: February 17, 1998
- Competitors: 52 from 13 nations
- Winning score: 933.0

Medalists
1st place, gold medalist(s)		Japan; Takanobu Okabe, Hiroya Saito, Masahiko Harada, Kazuyoshi Funaki
2nd place, silver medalist(s)		Germany; Sven Hannawald, Martin Schmitt, Hansjörg Jäkle, Dieter Thoma
3rd place, bronze medalist(s)		Austria; Reinhard Schwarzenberger, Martin Höllwarth, Stefan Horngacher, Andreas Widhölzl

The men's large hill team ski jumping competition for the 1998 Winter Olympics was held in Hakuba Ski Jumping Stadium. It occurred on 17 February.

The medals for the competition were presented by Juan Antonio Samaranch, President of the International Olympic Committee, and Shunichiro Okano, IOC Member; Japan, and the medalists' bouquets were presented by Marc Hodler, President of the International Ski Federation; Switzerland, and Yoshiro Ito, Vice-President of International Ski Federation, Japan.

== Results ==
Rank	Team	Jump 1	Jump 2	Total
1st place, gold medalist(s)	Japan; Takanobu Okabe; Hiroya Saito; Masahiko Harada; Kazuyoshi Funaki	397.1; 115.7; 131.5; 35.6; 114.3	535.9; 143.6; 124.7; 141.6; 126.0	933.0; 259.3; 256.2; 177.2; 240.3
2nd place, silver medalist(s)	Germany; Sven Hannawald; Martin Schmitt; Hansjörg Jäkle; Dieter Thoma	401.1; 125.4; 73.9; 71.3; 130.5	496.3; 132.9; 126.2; 122.3; 114.9	897.4; 258.3; 200.1; 193.6; 245.4
3rd place, bronze medalist(s)	Austria; Reinhard Schwarzenberger; Martin Höllwarth; Stefan Horngacher; Andreas Widhölzl	410.7; 83.2; 120.0; 83.6; 123.9	470.8; 113.3; 121.9; 92.9; 142.7	881.5; 196.5; 241.9; 176.5; 266.6
4	Norway; Henning Stensrud; Lasse Ottesen; Roar Ljøkelsøy; Kristian Brenden	399.4; 92.7; 107.4; 63.4; 135.9	471.2; 133.5; 101.4; 117.5; 118.8	870.6; 226.2; 208.8; 180.9; 254.7
5	Finland; Ari-Pekka Nikkola; Mika Laitinen; Janne Ahonen; Jani Soininen	370.6; 85.8; 101.6; 80.3; 102.9	463.3; 117.1; 82.5; 132.9; 130.8	833.9; 202.9; 184.1; 213.2; 233.7
6	Switzerland; Sylvain Freiholz; Marco Steinauer; Simon Ammann; Bruno Reuteler	345.6; 103.9; 93.5; 40.7; 107.5	389.4; 107.2; 81.9; 77.0; 123.3	735.0; 211.1; 175.4; 117.7; 230.8
7	Czech Republic; Jakub Sucháček; František Jež; Michal Doležal; Jaroslav Sakala	300.2; 31.6; 109.4; 77.0; 82.2	410.1; 117.9; 89.7; 128.2; 74.3	710.3; 149.5; 199.1; 205.2; 156.5
8	Poland; Adam Małysz; Łukasz Kruczek; Wojciech Skupień; Robert Mateja	326.7; 95.2; 87.4; 44.5; 99.6	371.2; 108.5; 78.4; 90.6; 93.7	697.9; 203.7; 165.8; 135.1; 193.3
9	Russia; Nikolay Petrushin; Artur Khamidulin; Aleksandr Volkov; Valery Kobelev	264.9; 56.0; 63.8; 74.4; 70.7	374.8; 97.0; 88.3; 77.5; 112.0	639.7; 153.0; 152.1; 151.9; 182.7
10	Slovenia; Miha Rihtar; Peter Žonta; Blaž Vrhovnik; Primož Peterka	247.1; 65.7; 2.4; 58.0; 121.0	363.2; 115.0; 101.7; 65.2; 81.3	610.3; 180.7; 104.1; 123.2; 202.3
11	Kazakhstan; Pavel Gayduk; Aleksandr Kolmakov; Dmitry Chvykov; Stanislav Filimonov	231.2; 52.1; 81.0; 65.5; 32.6	370.8; 73.9; 95.1; 78.0; 123.8	602.0; 126.0; 176.1; 143.5; 156.4
12	United States; Mike Keuler; Alan Alborn; Randy Weber; Casey Colby	211.5; 65.6; 50.7; 41.6; 53.6	279.2; 72.5; 69.3; 68.0; 69.4	490.7; 138.1; 120.0; 109.6; 123.0
13	South Korea; Kim Heung-Soo; Kim Hyeon-Gi; Choi Yong-Jik; Choi Heung-Chul	145.0; 55.1; 27.5; 39.3; 23.1	228.8; 48.0; 49.2; 47.5; 84.1	373.8; 103.1; 76.7; 86.8; 107.2
