= 1998–99 FIS Ski Jumping World Cup – Zakopane =

Part of the 1998/1999 World Cup season

The FIS Ski Jumping World Cup in Zakopane event took place from 15 to 17 January 1999 as part of the 1998/1999 World Cup season. Competitions were held on the Wielka Krokiew ski jump, featuring two individual events on the large hill. This marked the fifth time that athletes competed for points in the overall World Cup classification in Zakopane.

In the first competition on the Wielka Krokiew, Stefan Horngacher claimed victory, while Janne Ahonen emerged as the best competitor in the second event.

Janne Ahonen finished in second place in the first competition, and Kazuyoshi Funaki took second in the second competition. Tommy Ingebrigtsen secured third place in the first event, while Stefan Horngacher finished third in the second.

This was the third time in history that two individual competitions on the large hill were held in Zakopane as part of the World Cup, following similar events in 1996 and 1998. In 1980, one competition was organized on the normal hill and one on the large hill, while in 1990, only one event was held on the large hill.

A total of 68 competitors from 14 national teams participated in the event. The oldest participant was Japan's Masahiko Harada, aged 30 years and 251 days, while the youngest was Polish athlete Bartłomiej Nikiel, who was 15 years and 191 days old. (Note: The age of the competitor on the day of the competition, i.e., 15 January 1999.)

== Before the competitions ==
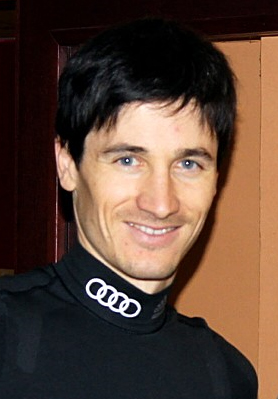
Martin Schmitt, the runner-up in the overall World Cup standings before the competitions in Zakopane

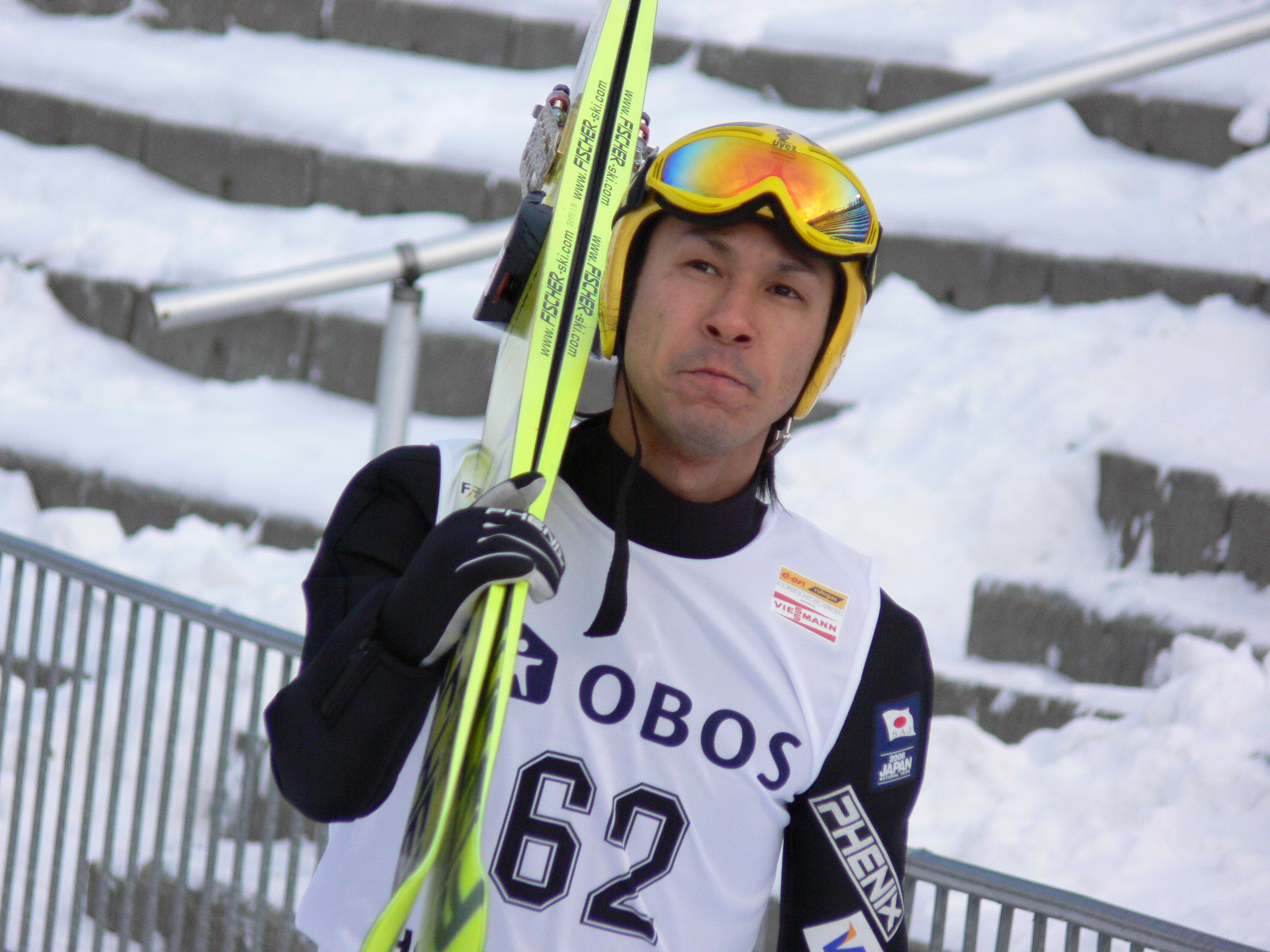
Noriaki Kasai, the fourth-ranked competitor in the overall World Cup standings before the competitions in Zakopane

Before the World Cup ski jumping competitions in Zakopane, 14 individual events had already taken place in the series. The leader of the overall World Cup standings was Janne Ahonen. The Finnish representative had amassed 1.043 points, leading second-place Martin Schmitt by 165 points. In third place was Kazuyoshi Funaki with 761 points. In the Nations Cup standings, the Japanese team led ahead of Germany and Austria.

In the events held before the Zakopane competitions, the following athletes won: six times – Martin Schmitt, four times – Janne Ahonen, twice – Andreas Widhölzl, and once each – Kazuyoshi Funaki and Noriaki Kasai.

From 30 December 1998 to 6 January 1999, the 47th Four Hills Tournament was held. The champion was Janne Ahonen, who achieved overall victory without winning any of the four tournament competitions. The events in Oberstdorf and Garmisch-Partenkirchen were won by Martin Schmitt. However, the German representative finished in lower positions in the subsequent events (13th in Innsbruck and 14th in Bischofshofen) and ultimately ranked 4th in the final classification of the 47th Four Hills Tournament. The second and third places in the tournament went to the Japanese competitors Noriaki Kasai and Hideharu Miyahira.

In the last competitions before the World Cup in Zakopane, held in Engelberg (January 9–10), Janne Ahonen and Kazuyoshi Funaki emerged victorious. In the first competition, the Finnish representative outperformed the Japanese competitor and Martin Schmitt and Noriaki Kasai, who were tied for third place. In the second event, the Olympic champion on the large hill from Nagano won ahead of Andreas Widhölzl and Kasai.

The only Polish representative classified in the World Cup was Wojciech Skupień. The jumper from Zakopane had earned 10 points in the overall standings by the time the competitions in Zakopane began, placing him in 49th position. In the Nations Cup, the Polish team ranked thirteenth. The poor performance of the athletes led to the resignation of Pavel Mikeska from his position as coach of the Polish ski jumping team. Piotr Fijas, Mikeska's assistant, was appointed as the acting coach.

World Cup standings before the competitions in Zakopane
Place	Athlete	Country	Points	Gap to leader
1.	Janne Ahonen	Finland	1043	–
2.	Martin Schmitt	Germany	878	165
3.	Kazuyoshi Funaki	Japan	761	282
4.	Noriaki Kasai	Japan	702	341
5.	Andreas Widhölzl	Austria	544	499
6.	Sven Hannawald	Germany	381	662
7.	Morten Ågheim	Norway	374	669
8.	Stefan Horngacher	Austria	360	683
9.	Masahiko Harada	Japan	315	728
10.	Hideharu Miyahira	Japan	305	738
11.	Andreas Goldberger	Austria	298	745
12.	Kazuya Yoshioka	Japan	295	748
13.	Wolfgang Loitzl	Austria	294	749
14.	Nicolas Dessum	France	265	778
15.	Dieter Thoma	Germany	240	803
16.	Martin Höllwarth	Austria	218	825
17.	Kristian Brenden	Norway	214	829
18.	Lasse Ottesen	Norway	207	836
19.	Hiroya Saitō	Japan	203	840
20.	Tommy Ingebrigtsen	Norway	191	852
21.	Ronny Hornschuh	Germany	181	862
22.	Reinhard Schwarzenberger	Austria	170	873
23.	Jakub Sucháček	Czech Republic	152	891
24.	Mika Laitinen	Finland	122	921
25.	Hansjörg Jäkle	Germany	113	930
26.	Primož Peterka	Slovenia	111	932
27.	Christian Meyer	Norway	95	948
27.	Christof Duffner	Germany	95	948
29.	Olav Magne Dønnem	Norway	79	964
30.	Alexander Herr	Germany	78	965
31.	Takanobu Okabe	Japan	72	971
32.	Bruno Reuteler	Switzerland	68	975
33.	Jani Soininen	Finland	65	978
34.	Roar Ljøkelsøy	Norway	54	989
35.	Gerd Siegmund	Germany	53	990
36.	Roberto Cecon	Italy	52	991
36.	Sylvain Freiholz	Switzerland	52	991
38.	Michal Doležal	Czech Republic	46	997
38.	Peter Žonta	Slovenia	46	997
40.	Jakub Janda	Czech Republic	39	1004
40.	Marco Steinauer	Switzerland	39	1004
42.	Henning Stensrud	Norway	26	1017
43.	Valery Kobelev	Russia	25	1018
44.	Arthur Khamidulin	Russia	23	1020
45.	Damjan Fras	Slovenia	18	1025
46.	Lucas Chevalier-Girod	France	17	1026
47.	Kristoffer Jåfs	Sweden	13	1030
47.	Jakub Hlava	Czech Republic	13	1030
49.	Wojciech Skupień	Poland	10	1033
50.	Kjell Erik Sagbakken	Norway	9	1034
50.	Blaž Vrhovnik	Slovenia	9	1034
52.	Tom Aage Aarnes	Norway	8	1035
52.	Risto Jussilainen	Finland	8	1035
52.	Jaroslav Sakala	Czech Republic	8	1035
55.	Alan Alborn	United States	7	1036
56.	Jon Petter Sandaker	Norway	6	1037
57.	Bine Norčič	Slovenia	5	1038
58.	Rico Parpan	Switzerland	4	1039
58.	Janne Väätäinen	Finland	4	1039
58.	Falko Krismayr	Austria	4	1039
61.	Milan Živič	Slovenia	3	1040
61.	Jussi Hautamäki	Finland	3	1040
63.	Roland Audenrieth	Germany	2	1041
64.	Stanislav Filimonov	Kazakhstan	1	1042
64.	Lauri Hakola	Finland	1	1042
64.	Robert Křenek	Czech Republic	1	1042
64.	Choi Yong-jik	South Korea	1	1042
64.	Matti Hautamäki	Finland	1	1042
64.	Andreas Küttel	Switzerland	1	1042

=== Organization of the competitions ===
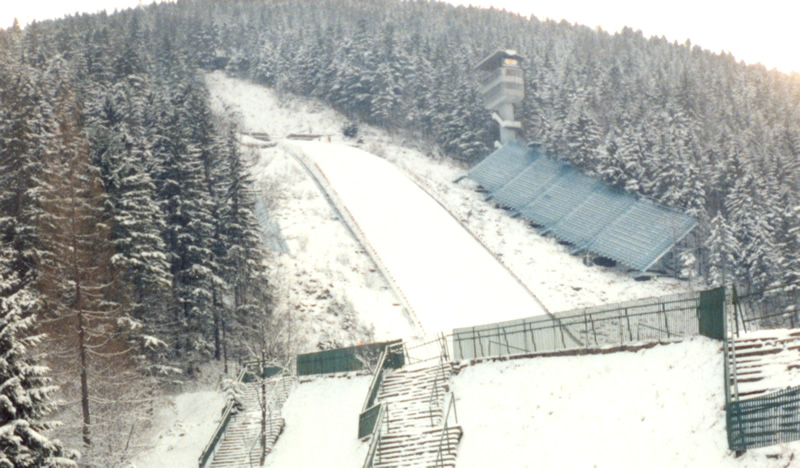
Wielka Krokiew in Zakopane

The organization of the Ski Jumping World Cup in Zakopane was managed by the Polish and Tatra Ski Association. The international broadcasting and television transmission of the events were handled by Telewizja Poland. The total cost of organizing the competitions was 500.000 PLN.

A significant challenge for the organizers of the World Cup competitions in Zakopane was the thaw that occurred a week before the events. This thaw caused the snow on the already prepared Wielka Krokiew ski jump to melt. To restore the ski jump for competition use, the organizers brought in snow from higher mountain areas. In the final days before the competitions in Zakopane, a drop in temperature allowed the organizers to use snow cannons to prepare the venue.

Before the start of the World Cup competitions in Zakopane, the president of the Polish Ski Association, Paweł Włodarczyk, promised a bonus of 10.000 PLN for any Polish representative who finished in the top ten of one of the two competitions on the Wielka Krokiew.

=== Competition program ===
The first official training session was scheduled for 15 January 1999, and the last competition was the second cup event held two days later. A total of two individual competitions, as well as two qualifying rounds, two official training sessions, and a trial series were planned.

The table below presents a detailed schedule of the jump series planned for the Zakopane 1999 World Cup.

Date	Time (Note: Times are given in local time.)	Event
15 January 1999	11:00 AM	Official training on the K-116 jump (2 series)
15 January 1999	1:00 PM	Qualifying round before the individual competitions on the K-116 jump
16 January 1999	12:00 PM	Trial series before the individual competitions on the K-116 jump
16 January 1999	1:00 PM	Start of the first competition series of the individual competitions on the K-116 jump, followed by the second competition series
17 January 1999	11:00 AM	Qualifying round before the individual competitions on the K-116 jump
17 January 1999	1:00 PM	Start of the first competition series of the individual competitions on the K-116 jump, followed by the second competition series

== Ski jump ==
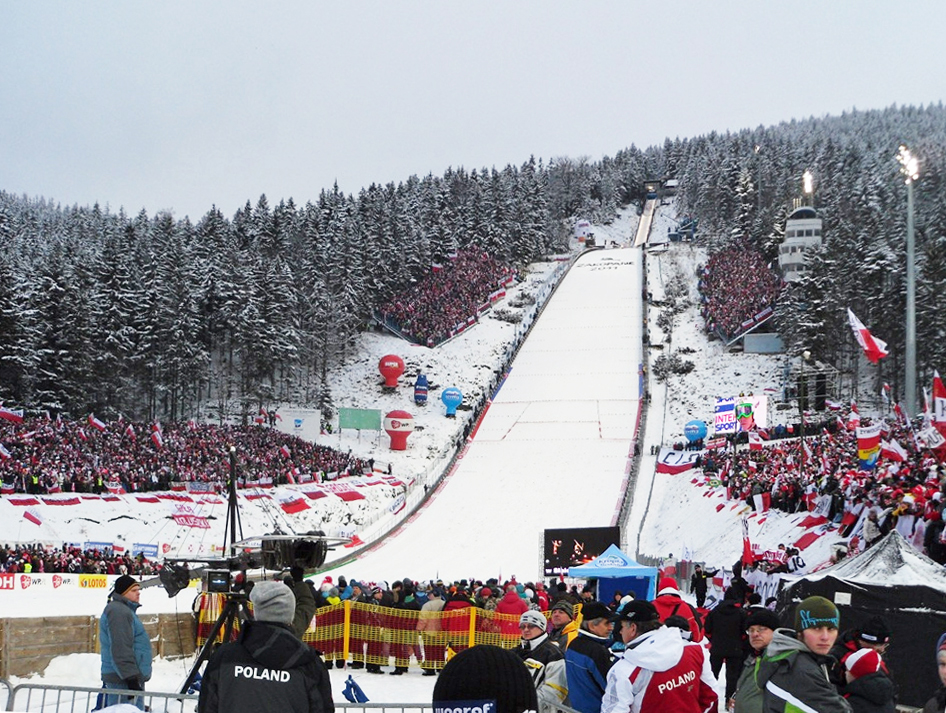
Wielka Krokiew

The 1999 Zakopane World Cup ski jumping competitions were held at Wielka Krokiew, a ski jump named after skier Stanisław Marusarz, located on the northern slope of Krokiew mountain in the Western Tatras. Two individual competitions were held on this hill. Previously, the World Cup had been held at Wielka Krokiew four times, in 1980, 1990, 1996, and 1998.

Name of ski jump	Location	K-Point	Jury point	Record (Note: The table shows the hill records valid before the start of the World Cup competitions.)		
Wielka Krokiew	Zakopane, Poland	K-116	128 m	130.0 m (Note: The unofficial hill record was 130.5 m, held by Aleksander Bojda. He achieved this result at the National Youth Olympics in 1996.)	Primož Peterka	27 January 1996

== Jury ==
The competition director, representing the International Ski and Snowboard Federation, was Walter Hofer, assisted by Miran Tepeš. The competition manager representing the organizers of the Zakopane World Cup was Lech Nadarkiewicz from Poland. The technical delegate for all events was Paul Ganzenhuber from Austria, with Bertil Palsrud from Norway as his assistant.

The table below shows the judging positions for each judge in the various rounds.

Judge	Country	Judging tower position			
Judge	Country	Qualifications for first individual competition (15/16 January 1999)	First individual competition (16 January 1999)	Qualifications for second individual competition (17 January 1999)	Second individual competition (17 January 1999)
Janež Frelih	Slovenia	A	A	B	B
Andreas Langer	Germany	B	B	A	A
Nils Livland	Norway	D	D	C	C
Jerzy Pilch	Poland	E	E	D	D
Stanislav Slavik	Czech Republic	C	C	E	E

== Competition overview ==
=== Training rounds and qualifications for the first individual event (15 January 1999) ===
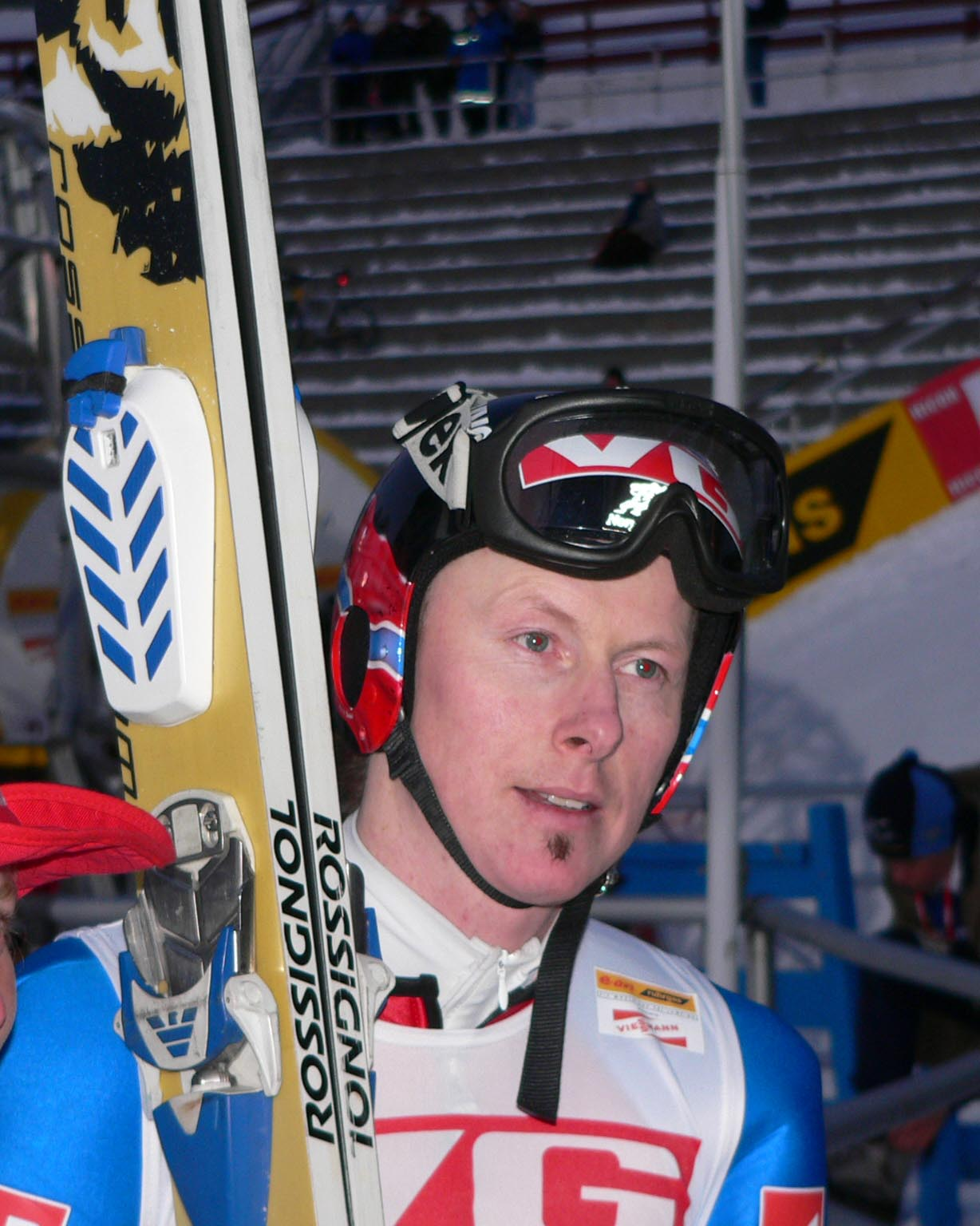
Tommy Ingebrigtsen, 3rd place finisher in the first competition in Zakopane

The first training round before the World Cup events in Zakopane was interrupted by the competition jury due to excessively strong winds. The remaining rounds were not held. The qualification round planned for Friday was rescheduled to take place on competition day.

=== Training round and qualifications for the first individual event (16 January 1999) ===
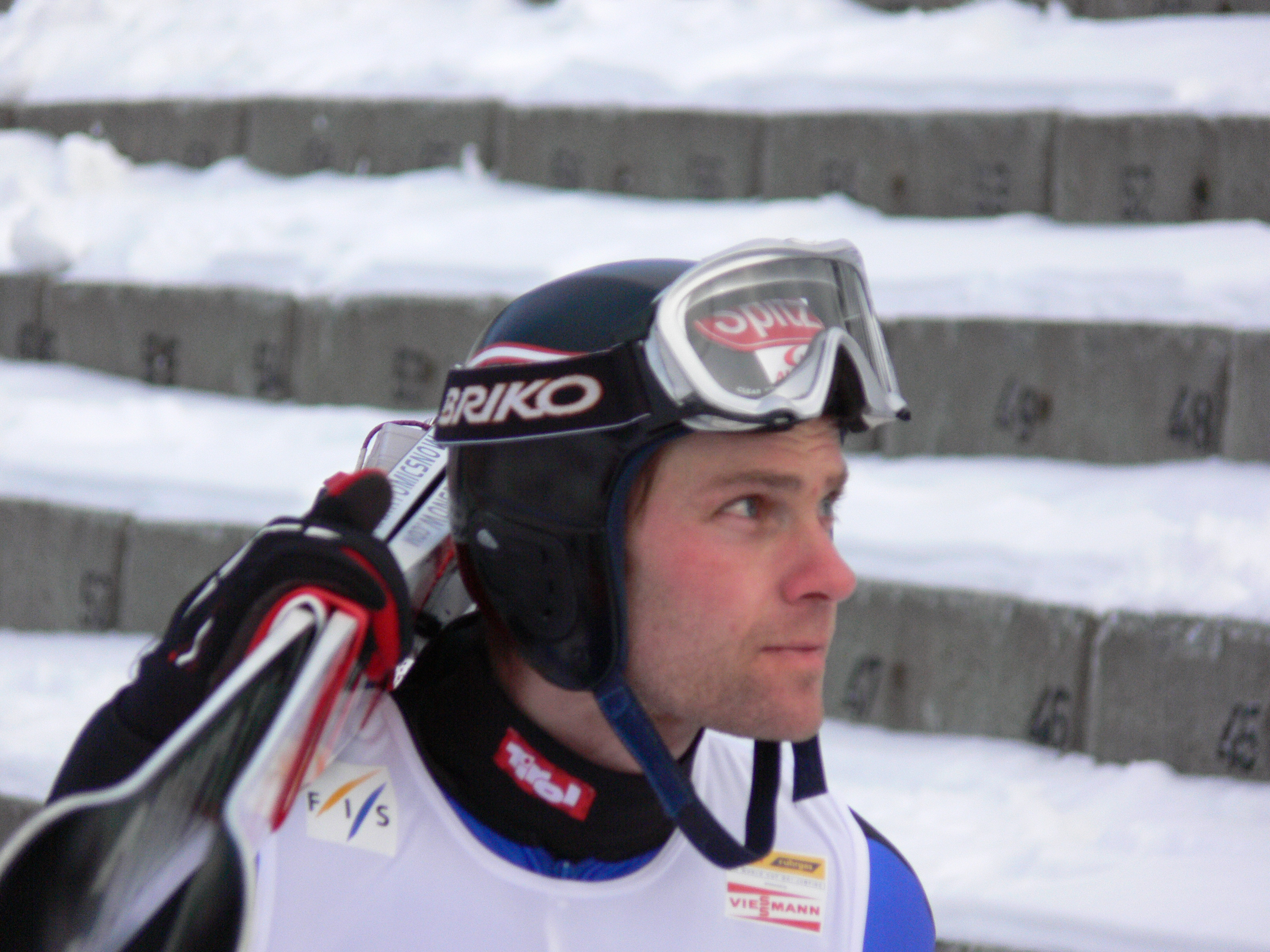
Andreas Widhölzl, 4th place finisher in both competitions in Zakopane

According to FIS regulations, at least one training round must be held before qualifications or the competition itself. Since no scheduled rounds were completed the day before, the organizers decided to conduct training before qualifications. The longest jump in the training round was made by Robert Mateja, who landed at 110 meters.

The qualifications concluded with Janne Ahonen in first place. The World Cup leader jumped 119.5 meters. Kazuyoshi Funaki landed three and a half meters closer and, despite high scores from the judges, finished 0.8 points behind Ahonen. Dieter Thoma from Germany placed third with a 118-meter jump. The best jumper among those competing for a spot in the first competition round was Hiroya Saitō. The Japanese athlete placed 7th with a jump of 111 meters.

Andreas Goldberger (69 m) and Sven Hannawald (61.5 m) made very short jumps in the qualification round, placing 64th and 67th, respectively. They qualified for the competition only by virtue of their standings within the top fifteen in the overall World Cup rankings.

A total of 68 athletes from 14 countries participated in the qualifications.

=== First individual competition (16 January 1999) ===
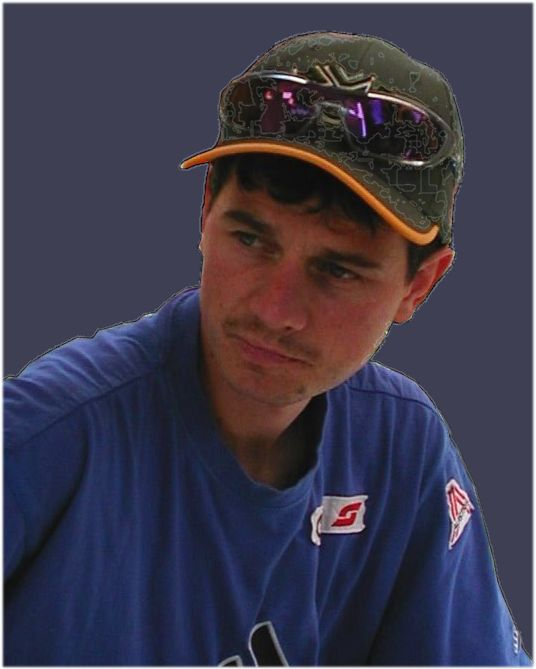
Stefan Horngacher, winner of the first competition in Zakopane

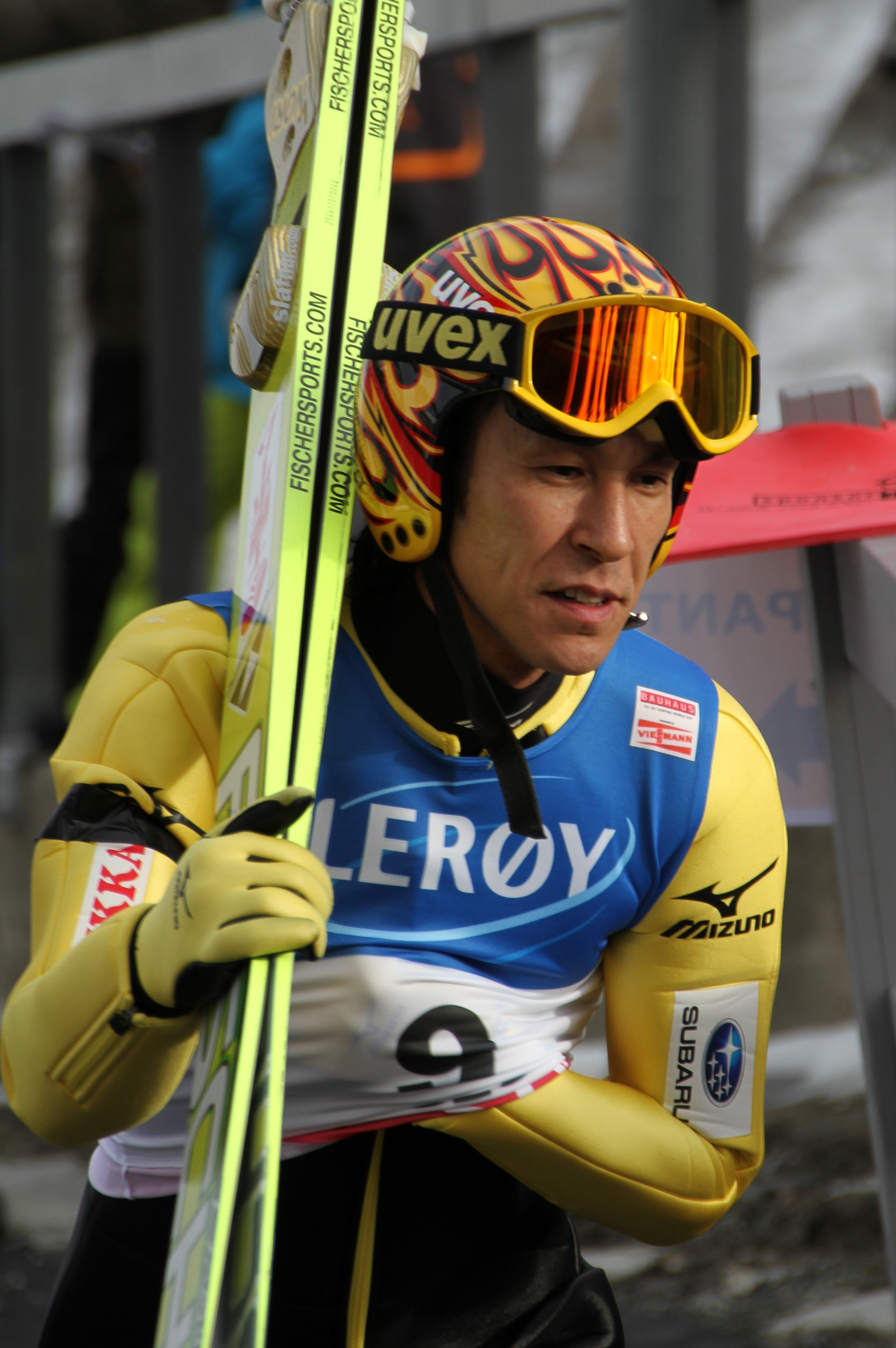
Noriaki Kasai, 5th place finisher in the first competition in Zakopane

The first individual competition of the World Cup ski jumping event in Zakopane 1999 began with a jump from Polish representative Andrzej Młynarczyk, who achieved a distance of 94.5 meters. This placed him in first position until the jump of the seventh competitor, Robert Mateja, who landed 13.5 meters farther and became the new leader of the competition. Adam Małysz, starting with number ten, jumped 103 meters and positioned himself just behind Mateja. Following Małysz, other competitors, including Takanobu Okabe and Primož Peterka, landed at 96.5 and 97 meters, respectively. During the first round, there was a tailwind that hindered achieving good distances.

Mateja remained in first place until the jump of the 32nd competitor, Tommy Ingebrigtsen, who achieved 115 meters and became the new leader of the competition. The Norwayn gained a 12.6-point advantage over the previous leader. Kristian Brenden managed a jump of 96 meters, which was too short for the previous year's World Cup winner in Zakopane to advance to the second round. Emmanuel Chedal, starting with number 38, landed at 111.5 meters and was just behind Ingebrigtsen. Andreas Goldberger opened the last ten jumps of the first round with a landing at 103 meters. Hideharu Miyahira and Masahiko Harada, who followed him, achieved distances of 110 and 107.5 meters, respectively, placing them among the leaders of the event. Stefan Horngacher surpassed Ingebrigtsen with a jump of 118.5 meters, becoming the new leader. Ingebrigtsen was not overtaken by Morten Ågheim (106.5 meters), Sven Hannawald (106.5 meters), Andreas Widhölzl (115 meters), Noriaki Kasai (107 meters), Kazuyoshi Funaki (109.5 meters), and Janne Ahonen, who led the World Cup standings with a jump of 108.5 meters.

After the first round, Stefan Horngacher held first place, followed by Andreas Widhölzl, Tommy Ingebrigtsen, Nicolas Dessum, and Hideharu Miyahira. The highest-ranked Polish athlete was Robert Mateja in ninth place.

Lasse Ottesen made the first jump of the second round, achieving a distance of 107 meters. The lead changed hands after the jump of the twenty-sixth competitor from the first round, Henning Stensrud, who also landed at 107 meters. The Norwayn held the lead until Peter Žonta, who placed 23rd after a jump of 100.5 meters in the first round, improved his distance by 7.5 meters in the final round and took the lead by 5.7 points over Stensrud. Alexander Herr achieved 106.5 meters, placing him in second place.

Another lead change occurred after the jump of Martin Höllwarth. The Austrian landed at 107 meters, surpassing Žonta by 1.7 points. Kazuyoshi Funaki, following Höllwarth, landed at 115.5 meters and became the new leader thanks to high judges' scores, gaining an 18.6-point advantage over Höllwarth. Funaki was then overtaken by Christian Meyer, who jumped 118.5 meters and took the lead. Andreas Goldberger, with a jump of 115 meters, placed third behind Meyer and Funaki. Noriaki Kasai, eleventh after the first round, achieved 117.5 meters in the final and became the new leader. Masahiko Harada, starting the last ten jumps, achieved a result 10.5 meters shorter and was placed fifth. Robert Mateja followed with the shortest jump of the entire series (88.5 meters), dropping to twentieth place.

Janne Ahonen, eighth after the first round, landed at 121 meters, taking the lead in the competition. Sven Hannawald followed with a jump of 109.5 meters, finishing fourth. Dieter Thoma managed only 109 meters, dropping to seventh place with a 21.1-point deficit to Ahonen. Hideharu Miyahira, fifth after the first jump, achieved 103 meters this time, closing the top ten of the competition. Nicolas Dessum landed 100.5 meters, also losing his place in the top ten. Tommy Ingebrigtsen, third after the first round, achieved 113.5 meters, finishing in second place, just 1.8 points behind the leader Ahonen. Andreas Widhölzl, second after the first jump, landed at 110 meters, finishing third.

Stefan Horngacher, the winner of the first round, jumped 119.5 meters, which was enough for him to secure his second career victory in World Cup ski jumping. His previous win was on 24 February 1991 at the Kulm giant hill in Tauplitz/Bad Mitterndorf. The remaining podium places went to Janne Ahonen and Tommy Ingebrigtsen. The best Polish representative was Adam Małysz, who finished in twenty-seventh place.

A total of 50 competitors from 11 countries participated in the event.

=== Qualifications for the second individual competition (17 January 1999) ===
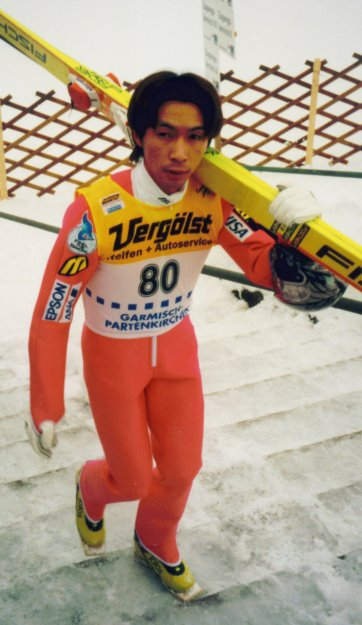
Hideharu Miyahira, 5th place finisher in the second competition in Zakopane

The qualifying round for the second individual competition in Zakopane concluded with Kazuyoshi Funaki's victory. The eighth-place finisher from the first competition achieved a distance of 118.5 meters this time. Robert Mateja secured second place, landing at 118 meters, making him the best among the Polish competitors vying for a spot in the main event. Stefan Horngacher finished third; the winner of the Saturday competition jumped half a meter farther than Mateja but lost to the Polish athlete by 3.8 points due to lower style scores from the judges.

Andreas Widhölzl had a very short jump in the qualifying round, landing at 72 meters, which placed him in 66th position. He secured his place in the competition solely due to his ranking in the top fifteen of the overall World Cup standings.

A total of 68 competitors from 14 countries participated in the qualifications.

=== Second individual competition (17 January 1999) ===
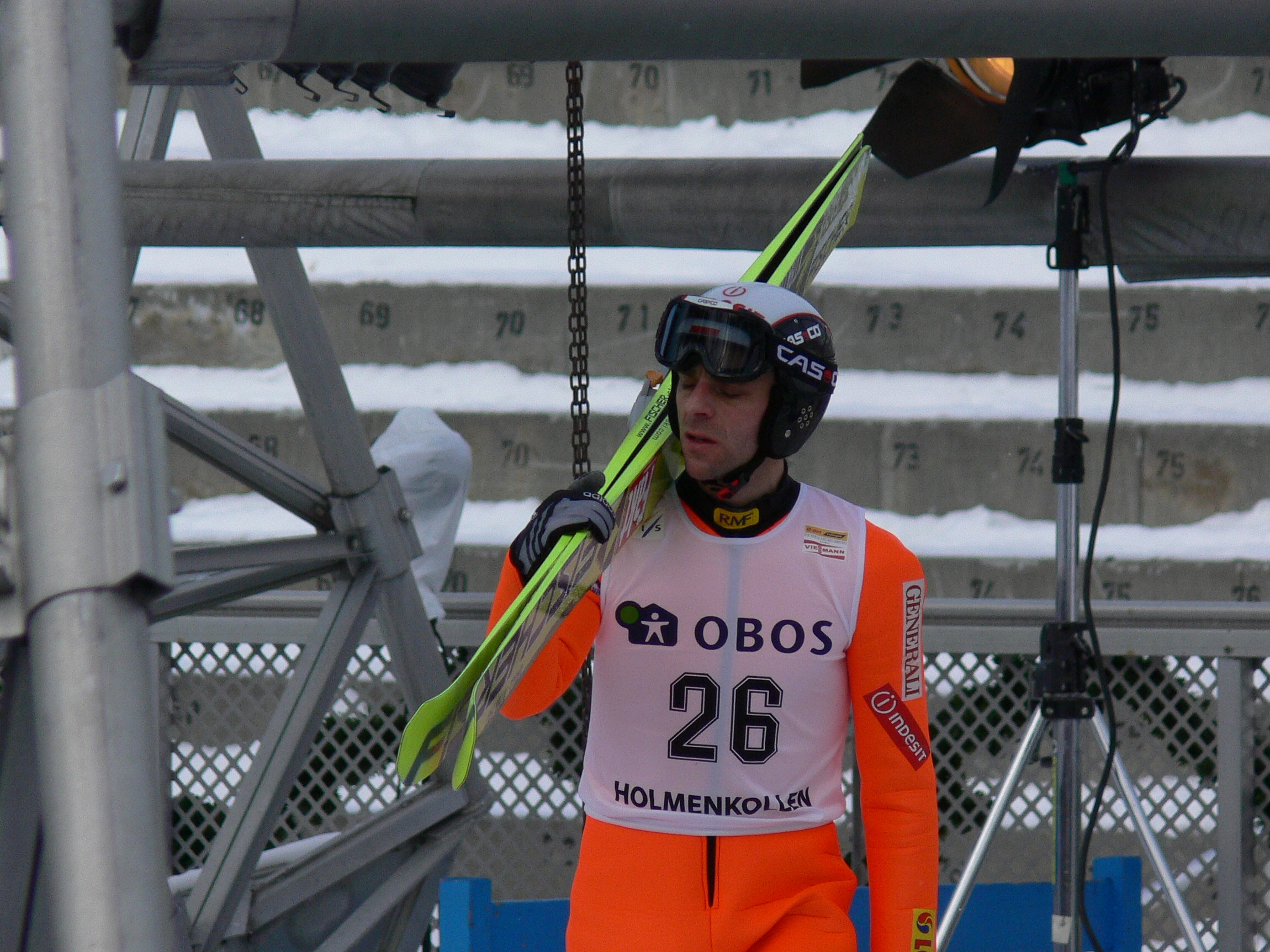
Robert Mateja, leader after the first series of the second competition in Zakopane

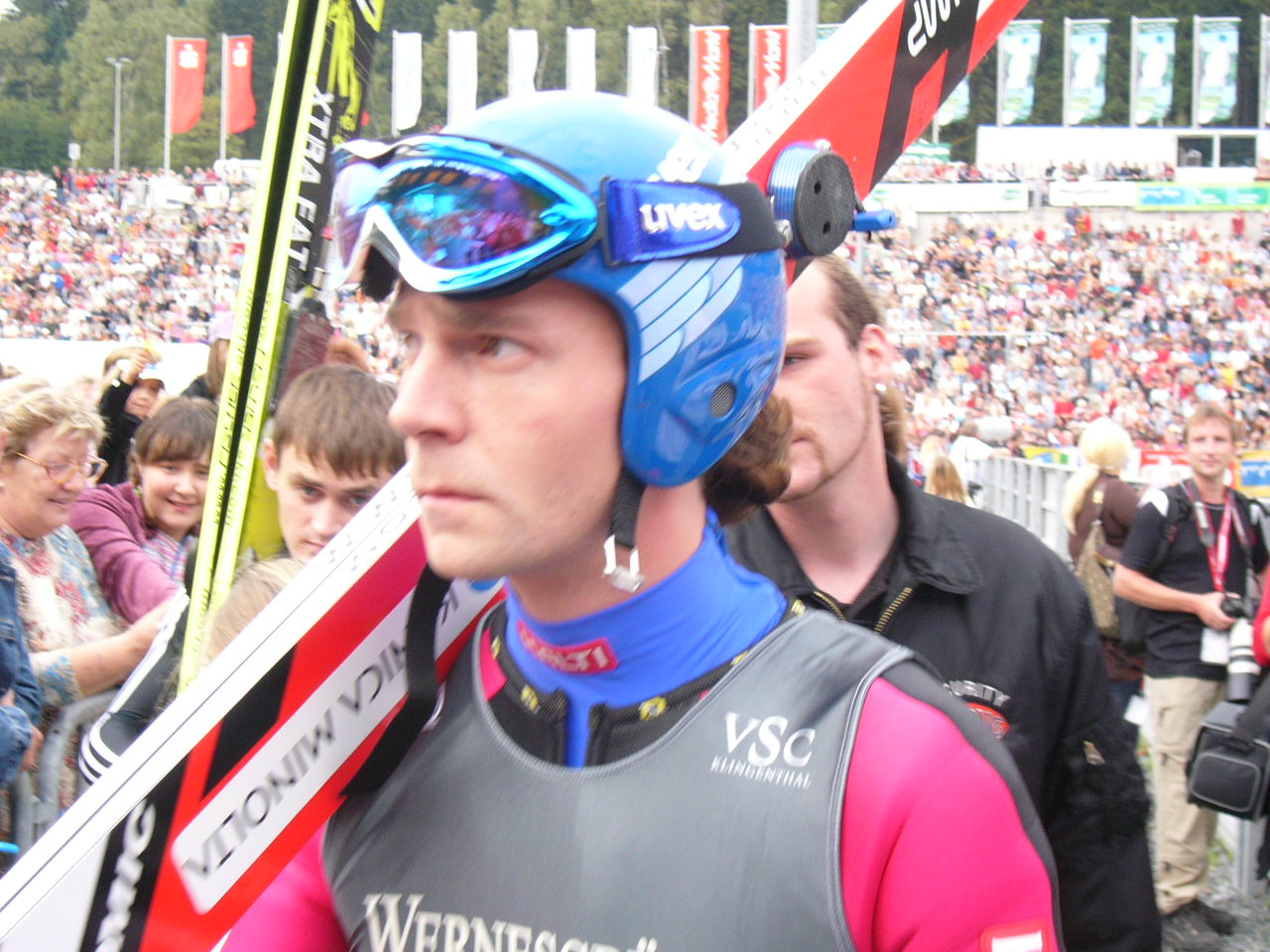
Janne Ahonen, winner of the second competition in Zakopane

The second individual competition at the Wielka Krokiew was held under sunny weather conditions. The event began with Krystian Długopolski, who jumped 90.5 meters. Following him, Andrzej Młynarczyk landed 2 meters further. The third competitor, Martin Mesík, surpassed the Polish representatives with a jump of 94 meters. Rolando Kaligaro improved upon Mesík's result by 2.5 meters and became the leader of the competition. Slovenia's lead was then taken over by Łukasz Kruczek, who jumped 105.5 meters. Marius Småriset, in sixth place, managed to jump 1 meter farther than Kruczek, thus surpassing the Polish representative. Starting eighth, Robert Mateja became the new leader of the competition with a jump of 126 meters. The favorable headwind assisted the Polish athlete, but then the wind changed direction, making it difficult for the remaining competitors to achieve long jumps.

The twenty-first competitor on the ramp was Peter Žonta. The Slovenian landed at 113.5 meters, placing him second with a 21.5-point deficit to Mateja. Norwayn skier Christian Meyer, who jumped in the 28th position, achieved a distance of 112 meters, securing third place. Starting in the 30th position, Ronny Hornschuh jumped 114.5 meters and was only behind Mateja. Reinhard Schwarzenberger from Austria also could not surpass Mateja, landing at 116 meters, which put him 17 points behind the leader. His compatriot Martin Höllwarth landed three meters shorter, placing him fourth. Dieter Thoma, who jumped in the 37th position, achieved a distance of 117 meters, trailing Mateja by 15.5 points. Hideharu Miyahira followed, with a jump of 116.5 meters, while Andreas Goldberger landed 9.5 meters shorter. Masahiko Harada jumped 111 meters, and Morten Ågheim could not maintain his jump of 113 meters, which cost him a chance to qualify for the final series.

None of the following competitors managed to surpass Robert Mateja: Sven Hannawald (118 m), Stefan Horngacher (121 m), Andreas Widhölzl (110.5 m), and Noriaki Kasai (110 m). As the second-to-last competitor, Kazuyoshi Funaki soared to 119 meters and received the highest score of 20 points from all judges for his jump. He was ranked second, 5.1 points behind Mateja. The World Cup leader Janne Ahonen achieved a jump of 119 meters, placing third, 6.6 points off the lead. Thus, after the first half of the competition, Robert Mateja led, followed by Kazuyoshi Funaki and Janne Ahonen.

The second series began with Lasse Ottesen, who held 30th place after the first series. The Norwayn achieved a distance of 108 meters, allowing him to lead the competition until the 24th jump of Henning Stensrud. Stensrud managed to jump half a meter further, putting him ahead by 4.8 points. The lead changed again with Nicolas Dessum's jump of 118 meters, which put the Frenchman ahead until Tommy Ingebrigtsen jumped 117.5 meters, surpassing Dessum by 4 points. Ingebrigtsen lost the lead after Andreas Widhölzl jumped 124 meters. Masahiko Harada, who was fifteenth after the first series, jumped 111 meters and placed fifth. Wolfgang Loitzl followed him, achieving a distance of 112.5 meters, which put him 12.3 points behind Widhölzl. Peter Žonta, who finished twelfth after the first series, jumped 112 meters, just behind Loitzl.

The last ten competitors in the second series began with Martin Höllwarth, who scored 109.5 meters and placed eighth. Ronny Hornschuh jumped 108 meters, falling behind Widhölzl by 21.1 points. Reinhard Schwarzenberger, the eighth jumper from the first series, managed only 99 meters, losing his place in the top ten. Dieter Thoma also spoiled his final attempt, achieving 108.5 meters and falling to twelfth place. Hideharu Miyahira advanced to second place with a well-rated jump of 110 meters in the second series. Sven Hannawald, landing 1.5 meters shorter, finished fifth, behind Widhölzl, Miyahira, Ingebrigtsen, and Loitzl. Fourth after the first series, Stefan Horngacher jumped 116.5 meters in the final round, taking the lead over Widhölzl by 1.9 points.

Next on the ramp was Janne Ahonen. The World Cup leader achieved the longest jump of the competition at 128.5 meters, becoming the new leader. Ahonen benefited from favorable conditions as the wind shifted to blow in his favor just before his jump. Kazuyoshi Funaki, the second-place jumper after the first series, landed 7.5 meters shorter than Ahonen, finishing second with a deficit of 4.6 points. When the final competitor, Robert Mateja, took his turn, the wind again shifted to an unfavorable direction for the jumpers. The Polish representative spoiled his final attempt, with a jump of 99 meters, which was the lowest-scored jump in the second series. This result placed Mateja in 16th place in the competition.

As a result, Janne Ahonen claimed victory. This win marked his tenth career triumph and fifth of the season in the World Cup. Kazuyoshi Funaki and Stefan Horngacher followed closely behind him in the rankings.

A total of 50 competitors from 11 countries participated in the competition.

== Falls ==
During the second individual competition at the Wielka Krokiew, there was one fall. Morten Ågheim could not maintain his jump of 113 meters.

== Controversies ==
During the second individual competition, there was a theft at the Hotel Zakopane, where all the national ski jumping teams were staying. Thieves broke into the hotel room of Wolfgang Loitzl and Reinhard Schwarzenberger, stealing documents, mobile phones, and cash amounting to approximately 1.000 USD.

== FIS World Cup standings after the competitions in Zakopane ==
Following the competitions in Zakopane, there were several changes in the standings of the top competitors in the World Cup. Stefan Horngacher moved up to sixth place, surpassing Sven Hannawald and Morten Ågheim. Hideharu Miyahira advanced from tenth to ninth position, overtaking Masahiko Harada. Kazuya Yoshioka and Wolfgang Loitzl both climbed from twelfth and thirteenth places to eleventh, sharing the same point total and pushing Andreas Goldberger down to thirteenth. The only change in the top fifteen of the overall World Cup standings was Tommy Ingebrigtsen replacing Dieter Thoma in fifteenth place before the competitions in Zakopane.

In the Nations Cup standings, Japan remained in first place. Austria moved up to second, at the expense of Germany, which fell to third place.

World Cup standings after the competitions in Zakopane
Place	Athlete	Country	Points	Gap to leader
1.	Janne Ahonen	Finland	1223	–
2.	Martin Schmitt	Germany	878	345
3.	Kazuyoshi Funaki	Japanese	873	350
4.	Noriaki Kasai	Japanese	771	452
5.	Andreas Widhölzl	Austria	644	579
6.	Stefan Horngacher	Austria	520	703
7.	Sven Hannawald	Germany	449	774
8.	Morten Ågheim	Norway	384	839
9.	Hideharu Miyahira	Japanese	370	853
10.	Masahiko Harada	Japanese	361	862
11.	Kazuya Yoshioka	Japanese	335	888
11.	Wolfgang Loitzl	Austria	335	888
13.	Andreas Goldberger	Austria	330	893
14.	Nicolas Dessum	France	309	914
15.	Tommy Ingebrigtsen	Norway	291	932
16.	Dieter Thoma	Germany	279	944
17.	Martin Höllwarth	Austria	254	969
18.	Kristian Brenden	Norway	224	999
19.	Lasse Ottesen	Norway	223	1000
20.	Hiroya Saitō	Japanese	214	1009
21.	Ronny Hornschuh	Germany	197	1026
22.	Reinhard Schwarzenberger	Austria	191	1032
23.	Jakub Sucháček	Czech Republic	152	1071
24.	Christian Meyer	Norway	149	1074
25.	Mika Laitinen	Finland	129	1094
26.	Hansjörg Jäkle	Germany	119	1104
27.	Primož Peterka	Slovenia	112	1111
28.	Alexander Herr	Germany	96	1127
29.	Christof Duffner	Germany	95	1128
30.	Peter Žonta	Slovenia	90	1133
31.	Olav Magne Dønnem	Norway	79	1144
32.	Jani Soininen	Finland	77	1146
33.	Takanobu Okabe	Japanese	73	1150
34.	Bruno Reuteler	Switzerland	68	1155
35.	Gerd Siegmund	Germany	55	1168
36.	Roar Ljøkelsøy	Norway	54	1169
37.	Roberto Cecon	Italy	52	1171
37.	Sylvain Freiholz	Switzerland	52	1171
39.	Henning Stensrud	Norway	50	1173
40.	Michal Doležal	Czech Republic	46	1177
41.	Jakub Janda	Czech Republic	39	1184
41.	Marco Steinauer	Switzerland	39	1184
43.	Valery Kobelev	Russia	25	1198
44.	Arthur Khamidulin	Russia	23	1200
45.	Damjan Fras	Slovenia	18	1205
45.	Robert Mateja	Poland	18	1205
47.	Lucas Chevalier-Girod	France	17	1206
48.	Kristoffer Jåfs	Sweden	13	1210
48.	Jakub Hlava	Czech Republic	12	1210
50.	Adam Małysz	Poland	12	1211
51.	Wojciech Skupień	Poland	10	1213
52.	Kjell Erik Sagbakken	Norway	9	1214
52.	Blaž Vrhovnik	Slovenia	9	1214
54.	Jaroslav Sakala	Czech Republic	8	1215
54.	Risto Jussilainen	Finland	8	1215
54.	Primož Urh-Zupan	Slovenia	8	1215
54.	Tom Aage Aarnes	Norway	8	1215
58.	Alan Alborn	United States	7	1216
59.	Jon Petter Sandaker	Norway	6	1217
59.	Łukasz Kruczek	Poland	6	1217
61.	Bine Norčič	Slovenia	5	1218
61.	Marius Småriset	Norway	5	1218
63.	Falko Krismayr	Austria	4	1219
63.	Janne Väätäinen	Finland	4	1219
63.	Rico Parpan	Slovenia	4	1219
66.	Milan Živič	Slovenia	3	1220
66.	Jussi Hautamäki	Finland	3	1220
68.	Roland Audenrieth	Germany	2	1221
68.	Martin Koch	Austria	2	1221
70.	Robert Křenek	Czech Republic	1	1222
70.	Choi Yong-jik	South Korea	1	1222
70.	Matti Hautamäki	Finland	1	1222
70.	Stanislav Filimonov	Kazakhstan	1	1222
70.	Andreas Küttel	Switzerland	1	1222
70.	Lauri Hakola	Finland	1	1222

== Medalists ==
=== First individual competition (16 January 1999) ===
Medal	Name	Jump 1	Jump 2	Style scores A • B • C • D • E	Total score	Difference
	(Austria) Stefan Horngacher	118.5 m 116.0 points	119.5 m 117.3 points	7.0 • 17.0 • 17.5 • 17.0 • 17.5 17.0 • 17.0 • 17.0 • 16.5 • 17.0	233.3 points	-
	(Finland) Janne Ahonen	108.5 m 103.5 points	121.0 m 124.0 points	19.0 • 19.0 • 19.0 • 19.0 • 19.5; 18.0 • 19.0 • 18.5 • 18.5 • 18.0	227.5 points	5.8 points
	(Norway) Tommy Ingebrigtsen	115.0 m 113.7 points	113.5 m 112.0 points	18.0 • 19.0 • 18.5 • 18.5 • 18.5; 19.0 • 19.0 • 19.0 • 18.5 • 18.5	225.7 points	7.6 points

=== Second individual competition (17 January 1999) ===
Medal	Name	Jump 1	Jump 2	Style scores A • B • C • D • E	Total score	Difference
	(Finland) Janne Ahonen	119.0 m 123.9 points	128.5 m 134.5 points	20.0 • 19.5 • 19.0 • 19.5 • 19.5; 17.5 • 17.0 • 16.5 • 17.5 • 17.5	258.4 points	-
	(Japan) Kazuyoshi Funaki	119.0 m 125.4 points	121.5 m 128.4 points	20.0 • 20.0 • 20.0 • 20.0 • 20.0; 19.5 • 19.0 • 19.5 • 19.5 • 19.5	253.8 points	4.6 points
	(Austria) Stefan Horngacher	121.0 m 120.0 points	116.5 m 112.9 points	17.0 • 17.5 • 17.0 • 17.0 • 17.0; 18.0 • 17.0 • 16.5 • 17.5 • 17.5	232.9 points	25.5 points

== Results ==
=== Qualifications for the first individual competition (16 January 1999) ===
Place	Jumper	Country	Jump	Points	Qualification
1.	Janne Ahonen	Finland	119.5	119.3	pq
2.	Kazuyoshi Funaki	Japan	116.0	118.5	pq
3.	Dieter Thoma	Germany	118.0	115.1	pq
4.	Nicolas Dessum	France	115.5	113.1	pq
5.	Masahiko Harada	Japan	114.0	112.9	pq
6.	Kazuya Yoshioka	Japan	111.5	107.9	pq
7.	Hiroya Saitō	Japan	111.0	106.5	Q
8.	Andreas Widhölzl	Austria	114.0	106.4	pq
9.	Jakub Sucháček	Czech Republic	112.0	104.8	Q
10.	Stefan Horngacher	Austria	112.5	103.2	pq
11.	Primož Peterka	Slovenia	109.5	101.8	Q
12.	Hansjörg Jäkle	Germany	108.5	101.5	Q
13.	Wolfgang Loitzl	Austria	108.0	100.6	pq
13.	Jani Soininen	Finland	108.0	100.6	Q
15.	Adam Małysz	Poland	108.0	100.1	Q
16.	Robert Mateja	Poland	108.5	99.5	Q
17.	Takanobu Okabe	Japan	107.0	98.8	Q
18.	Martin Koch	Austria	108.0	98.6	Q
19.	Tommy Ingebrigtsen	Norway	107.0	97.8	Q
20.	Primož Urh-Zupan	Slovenia	106.0	94.5	Q
21.	Peter Žonta	Slovenia	107.0	94.3	Q
22.	Hideharu Miyahira	Japan	105.0	91.2	pq
23.	Morten Ågheim	Norway	103.0	91.1	pq
24.	Kristian Brenden	Norway	105.5	90.6	Q
25.	Michal Doležal	Czech Republic	103.5	90.0	Q
26.	Alexander Herr	Germany	103.0	89.6	Q
26.	Lasse Ottesen	Norway	103.0	89.6	Q
26.	Martin Höllwarth	Austria	103.0	89.6	Q
29.	Gerd Siegmund	Germany	100.5	85.1	Q
30.	Wojciech Skupień	Poland	100.5	84.6	Q
31.	Rolando Kaligaro	Slovenia	99.5	84.3	Q
32.	Christof Duffner	Germany	100.5	84.1	Q
33.	Mika Laitinen	Finland	101.5	83.9	Q
34.	Henning Stensrud	Norway	100.5	83.1	Q
35.	Reinhard Schwarzenberger	Austria	99.5	82.3	Q
36.	Lucas Chevalier-Girod	France	100.0	82.2	Q
37.	Christian Meyer	Norway	98.0	80.6	Q
38.	Ivan Kozlov	Ukraine	98.0	79.6	Q
39.	Jakub Janda	Czech Republic	97.0	79.3	Q
40.	Łukasz Kruczek	Poland	97.5	79.2	Q
41.	Ronny Hornschuh	Germany	96.0	75.0	Q
42.	Janne Väätäinen	Finland	94.0	72.9	Q
43.	Noriaki Kasai	Japan	96.0	72.0	pq
44.	Martin Mesík	Slovakia	94.0	71.9	Q
45.	Andrzej Młynarczyk	Poland	93.5	71.5	Q
46.	Michal Pšenko	Slovakia	91.5	68.4	Q
47.	Marián Bielčík	Slovakia	91.5	66.9	Q
48.	Marek Gwóźdź	Poland	93.5	66.0	Q
49.	Kristoffer Jåfs	Sweden	92.0	64.3	nq
50.	Dušan Oršula	Slovakia	90.5	63.6	nq
51.	Yuri Mykytynec	Ukraine	89.5	61.8	nq
52.	Risto Jussilainen	Finland	87.0	57.8	nq
53.	Damjan Fras	Slovenia	86.5	52.9	nq
54.	Bartłomiej Nikiel	Poland	83.0	51.1	nq
55.	Mirosław Białobrzeski	Poland	82.5	45.2	nq
56.	Krystian Długopolski	Poland	83.0	44.6	nq
57.	Rafał Kuchta	Poland	82.0	43.8	nq
58.	Jakub Krysta	Poland	81.0	42.5	nq
59.	Wojciech Babiarz	Poland	80.5	40.6	nq
60.	Kayrat Biekenov	Kazakhstan	80.0	39.2	nq
61.	Jurij Rulew	Kazakhstan	75.5	37.1	nq
62.	Alaksandr Dziadziula	Belarus	77.0	34.8	nq
63.	Piotr Warwaruk	Ukraine	73.5	28.5	nq
64.	Andreas Goldberger	Austria	69.0	16.4	pq
65.	Wojciech Tajner	Poland	64.5	6.3	nq
66.	Marius Småriset	Norway	64.5	4.8	nq
67.	Sven Hannawald	Germany	61.5	2.9	pq
68.	Krzysztof Mroczkowski	Poland	59.0	0.0	nq

Legend:

pq – qualified automatically due to position in the top 15 of the World Cup standings
Q – qualified for the main competition
nq – did not qualify

=== First individual competition (16 January 1999) ===
Place	Jumper	Country	Jump 1	Jump 2	Points
1.	Stefan Horngacher	Austria	118.5	119.5	233.3
2.	Janne Ahonen	Finland	108.5	121.0	227.5
3.	Tommy Ingebrigtsen	Norway	115.0	113.5	225.7
4.	Andreas Widhölzl	Austria	115.0	110.0	219.4
5.	Noriaki Kasai	Japan	107.0	117.5	216.5
6.	Christian Meyer	Norway	103.0	118.5	213.6
7.	Sven Hannawald	Germany	109.5	109.5	208.1
8.	Kazuyoshi Funaki	Japan	101.5	115.5	208.0
9.	Andreas Goldberger	Austria	103.0	115.5	207.2
10.	Dieter Thoma	Germany	111.0	109.0	206.4
11.	Masahiko Harada	Japan	107.5	107.0	200.0
12.	Kazuya Yoshioka	Japan	106.0	108.0	198.6
13.	Hideharu Miyahira	Japan	110.0	103.0	196.3
14.	Nicolas Dessum	France	111.5	100.5	193.0
15.	Martin Höllwarth	Austria	103.0	107.0	189.4
16.	Peter Žonta	Slovenia	100.5	108.0	187.7
17.	Alexander Herr	Germany	101.0	106.5	183.9
18.	Henning Stensrud	Norway	100.0	107.0	182.0
19.	Reinhard Schwarzenberger	Austria	100.0	105.0	179.4
20.	Hiroya Saitō	Japan	100.0	103.0	178.8
21.	Morten Ågheim	Norway	106.5	100.5	178.0
22.	Lasse Ottesen	Norway	97.5	107.0	177.0
23.	Primož Urh-Zupan	Slovenia	100.5	99.5	167.4
24.	Mika Laitinen	Finland	98.0	100.0	166.8
25.	Hansjörg Jäkle	Germany	98.5	100.0	164.7
26.	Wolfgang Loitzl	Austria	103.5	94.0	160.9
27.	Adam Małysz	Poland	103.0	91.5	160.0
28.	Robert Mateja	Poland	108.0	85.5	156.2
29.	Martin Koch	Austria	101.5	91.0	155.4
30.	Primož Peterka	Slovenia	97.0	92.0	143.6
31.	Takanobu Okabe	Japan	96.5	-	78.9
32.	Andrzej Młynarczyk	Poland	94.5	-	75.3
33.	Rolando Kaligaro	Slovenia	95.0	-	75.2
34.	Jakub Sucháček	Czech Republic	95.5	-	75.1
35.	Gerd Siegmund	Germany	94.5	-	74.8
36.	Wojciech Skupień	Poland	95.0	-	74.7
37.	Łukasz Kruczek	Poland	94.5	-	73.8
38.	Kristian Brenden	Norway	96.0	-	73.0
39.	Christof Duffner	Germany	94.5	-	72.3
40.	Janne Väätäinen	Finland	90.0	-	64.7
40.	Lucas Chevalier-Girod	France	90.0	-	64.7
42.	Ivan Kozlov	Ukraine	89.5	-	63.8
43.	Ronny Hornschuh	Germany	89.5	-	63.3
44.	Michal Pšenko	Slovakia	89.0	-	62.9
45.	Jani Soininen	Finland	89.0	-	61.9
46.	Martin Mesík	Slovakia	89.0	-	61.4
47.	Michal Doležal	Czech Republic	88.5	-	61.0
48.	Marek Gwóźdź	Poland	88.0	-	60.6
49.	Marián Bielčík	Slovakia	87.5	-	59.7
49.	Jakub Janda	Czech Republic	87.5	-	59.7

=== Qualifications for the second individual competition (17 January 1999) ===
Place	Jumper	Country	Jump	Points	Qualification
1.	Kazuyoshi Funaki	Japan	118.5	124.5	pq
2.	Robert Mateja	Poland	118.0	118.6	Q
3.	Stefan Horngacher	Austria	118.5	115.0	pq
4.	Sven Hannawald	Germany	117.5	114.7	pq
5.	Nicolas Dessum	France	115.0	111.7	pq
6.	Kazuya Yoshioka	Japan	115.0	109.2	pq
7.	Jakub Sucháček	Czech Republic	113.0	107.6	Q
8.	Damjan Fras	Slovenia	114.0	105.4	Q
9.	Janne Ahonen	Finland	112.0	105.3	pq
10.	Peter Žonta	Slovenia	112.0	102.8	Q
11.	Łukasz Kruczek	Poland	107.0	98.8	Q
12.	Jani Soininen	Finland	106.5	97.4	Q
12.	Tommy Ingebrigtsen	Norway	109.0	97.4	Q
14.	Masahiko Harada	Japan	106.5	93.9	pq
15.	Dieter Thoma	Germany	107.0	93.8	pq
16.	Reinhard Schwarzenberger	Austria	106.5	93.4	Q
17.	Martin Höllwarth	Austria	104.5	93.3	Q
18.	Andreas Goldberger	Austria	105.0	92.7	pq
19.	Adam Małysz	Poland	103.5	92.5	Q
20.	Lucas Chevalier-Girod	France	104.5	91.8	Q
21.	Wolfgang Loitzl	Austria	103.0	91.6	pq
22.	Noriaki Kasai	Japan	106.0	91.5	pq
23.	Kristian Brenden	Norway	105.5	90.6	Q
24.	Primož Urh-Zupan	Slovenia	103.5	90.5	Q
25.	Takanobu Okabe	Japan	102.0	88.8	Q
26.	Lasse Ottesen	Norway	102.0	84.8	Q
27.	Henning Stensrud	Norway	100.5	84.6	Q
28.	Kristoffer Jåfs	Sweden	102.0	83.8	Q
29.	Hansjörg Jäkle	Germany	100.0	83.7	Q
30.	Hiroya Saitō	Japan	99.0	83.4	Q
31.	Alexander Herr	Germany	99.0	81.9	Q
32.	Wojciech Skupień	Poland	101.5	81.4	Q
33.	Christof Duffner	Germany	98.5	80.5	Q
34.	Hideharu Miyahira	Japan	99.0	80.4	pq
35.	Morten Ågheim	Norway	99.0	78.9	pq
36.	Andrzej Młynarczyk	Poland	98.5	78.0	Q
36.	Mika Laitinen	Finland	98.5	78.0	Q
38.	Gerd Siegmund	Germany	95.5	76.1	Q
39.	Michal Doležal	Czech Republic	95.0	75.2	Q
40.	Martin Koch	Austria	96.5	74.9	Q
41.	Krystian Długopolski	Poland	94.5	73.8	Q
42.	Christian Meyer	Norway	95.5	72.6	Q
43.	Rolando Kaligaro	Slovenia	92.5	71.7	Q
44.	Marius Småriset	Norway	94.0	71.4	Q
45.	Jakub Janda	Czech Republic	92.0	70.8	Q
46.	Ronny Hornschuh	Germany	92.5	69.2	Q
47.	Martin Mesík	Slovakia	93.0	67.6	Q
48.	Risto Jussilainen	Finland	91.0	67.5	Q
49.	Janne Väätäinen	Finland	91.5	65.4	Q
50.	Primož Peterka	Slovenia	90.5	65.1	nq
51.	Michal Pšenko	Slovakia	89.0	63.9	nq
52.	Ivan Kozlov	Ukraine	89.5	63.3	nq
53.	Dušan Oršula	Slovakia	90.0	60.7	nq
54.	Marián Bielčík	Slovakia	86.0	55.5	nq
55.	Yuri Mykytynec	Ukraine	84.0	52.4	nq
56.	Wojciech Tajner	Poland	85.0	52.2	nq
57.	Mirosław Białobrzeski	Poland	82.0	48.3	nq
58.	Jakub Krysta	Poland	81.5	43.4	nq
59.	Alaksandr Dziadziula	Belarus	81.0	43.0	nq
60.	Marek Gwóźdź	Poland	79.5	38.8	nq
61.	Wojciech Babiarz	Poland	78.5	37.5	nq
62.	Rafał Kuchta	Poland	77.5	36.7	nq
63.	Bartłomiej Nikiel	Poland	75.0	33.7	nq
64.	Piotr Warwaruk	Ukraine	74.5	29.3	nq
65.	Kayrat Biekenov	Kazakhstan	73.5	27.0	nq
66.	Andreas Widhölzl	Austria	72.0	23.3	pq
67.	Jurij Rulew	Kazakhstan	83.0	20.1	nq
68.	Krzysztof Mroczkowski	Poland	69.0	18.9	nq

Legend:

pq – qualified automatically due to position in the top 15 of the World Cup standings
Q – qualified for the main competition
nq – did not qualify

=== Second individual competition (17 January 1999) ===
Place	Jumper	Country	Jump 1	Jump 2	Points
1.	Janne Ahonen	Finland	119.0	128.5	258.4
2.	Kazuyoshi Funaki	Japan	119.0	121.5	253.8
3.	Stefan Horngacher	Austria	121.0	116.5	232.9
4.	Andreas Widhölzl	Austria	110.5	124.0	231.0
5.	Hideharu Miyahira	Japan	116.5	110.0	222.6
6.	Tommy Ingebrigtsen	Norway	110.5	117.5	220.8
7.	Wolfgang Loitzl	Austria	111.0	112.5	218.7
8.	Sven Hannawald	Germany	118.0	108.5	218.1
9.	Peter Žonta	Slovenia	113.5	112.0	217.3
10.	Nicolas Dessum	France	107.5	118.0	216.8
11.	Noriaki Kasai	Japan	110.0	113.5	216.2
12.	Masahiko Harada	Japan	112.0	111.0	214.3
13.	Martin Höllwarth	Austria	113.0	109.5	213.9
14.	Kazuya Yoshioka	Japan	112.5	109.5	211.5
15.	Ronny Hornschuh	Germany	114.5	108.0	209.9
16.	Robert Mateja	Poland	126.0	99.0	209.4
17.	Christian Meyer	Norway	112.0	106.0	205.8
18.	Dieter Thoma	Germany	118.5	104.5	203.3
19.	Jani Soininen	Finland	108.0	108.5	201.1
20.	Henning Stensrud	Norway	109.0	108.5	197.9
21.	Kristian Brenden	Norway	114.0	104.5	197.2
22.	Reinhard Schwarzenberger	Austria	116.0	99.0	196.9
23.	Adam Małysz	Poland	108.0	104.5	195.9
24.	Lasse Ottesen	Norway	106.0	108.0	193.1
25.	Łukasz Kruczek	Poland	105.5	106.0	191.6
26.	Marius Småriset	Norway	106.5	106.0	190.4
27.	Alexander Herr	Germany	110.0	99.5	188.5
28.	Andreas Goldberger	Austria	107.0	103.0	188.4
29.	Gerd Siegmund	Germany	106.5	101.5	183.8
30.	Takanobu Okabe	Japan	106.5	97.0	178.2
31.	Mika Laitinen	Finland	105.0	–	94.2
32.	Hiroya Saitō	Japan	104.0	–	93.9
33.	Jakub Janda	Czech Republic	104.0	–	92.4
34.	Michal Doležal	Czech Republic	104.5	–	92.3
35.	Kristoffer Jåfs	Sweden	105.0	–	89.7
36.	Hansjörg Jäkle	Germany	102.0	–	87.8
37.	Primož Urh-Zupan	Slovenia	102.5	–	87.7
38.	Christof Duffner	Germany	102.5	–	86.2
39.	Janne Väätäinen	Finland	100.5	–	86.1
40.	Jakub Sucháček	Czech Republic	101.5	–	85.4
41.	Wojciech Skupień	Poland	101.0	–	83.5
42.	Rolando Kaligaro	Slovenia	96.5	–	78.9
43.	Morten Ågheim	Norway	113.0	–	78.6
44.	Martin Mesík	Slovakia	94.0	–	73.4
45.	Lucas Chevalier-Girod	France	95.5	–	71.6
46.	Andrzej Młynarczyk	Poland	92.5	–	71.2
47.	Damjan Fras	Slovenia	94.5	–	70.3
48.	Krystian Długopolski	Poland	90.5	–	66.1
49.	Martin Koch	Austria	90.5	–	65.6
50.	Risto Jussilainen	Finland	89.0	–	57.9

== National team lineups ==
Below is a summary of the lineups of all national teams that participated in the World Cup ski jumping competitions in Zakopane in 1999. Of the top fifteen in the overall World Cup standings, only Martin Schmitt, who was in second place before the competition in Poland, was absent at the startman representative was initially registered for the competition but ultimately did not arrive in Zakopane due to a cold.

Since the host of the event, it was entitled to field an additional ten competitors in the qualifiers from the so-called national quota, applicable for two competitions organized on home soil. Thus, 14 Polish representatives participated in the qualifications for each of the two competitions on the Wielka Krokiew hill.

Athlete	Date of birth	WC position	1998 Zakopane results		1999 Zakopane results
Athlete	Date of birth	WC position	I competition (17 January 1998)	II competition (18 January 1998)	I competition (16 January 1999)	II competition (17 January 1999)
Austria (7)
Andreas Goldberger	29 November 1972	11	37	12	9	28
Stefan Horngacher	20 September 1969	8	44	9	1	3
Martin Höllwarth	13 April 1974	16	7	16	15	13
Martin Koch	22 January 1982	–	–		29	49
Wolfgang Loitzl	13 January 1980	13	35	24	26	7
Reinhard Schwarzenberger	7 January 1977	22	9	25	19	22
Andreas Widhölzl	14 October 1976	5	4	28	4	4
Belarus (1)
Alaksandr Dziadziula	4 November 1982	–	–		q	q
Czech Republic (3)
Michal Doležal	11 March 1978	38	42	36	47	34
Jakub Janda	27 April 1978	40	–		49	33
Jakub Sucháček	27 November 1978	23	–		34	40
Finland (5)
Janne Ahonen	11 May 1977	1	2	6	2	1
Risto Jussilainen	10 June 1975	52	–		q	50
Mika Laitinen	5 March 1973	24	–		24	31
Jani Soininen	12 November 1972	33	40	6	45	19
Janne Väätäinen	6 March 1975	58	–		40	39
France (2)
Lucas Chevalier-Girod	26 January 1976	46	36	41	40	45
Nicolas Dessum	20 February 1977	14	–		14	10
Japan (7)
Kazuyoshi Funaki	27 April 1975	3	39	2	8	2
Masahiko Harada	9 May 1968	9	5	37	11	12
Noriaki Kasai	6 June 1972	4	–		5	11
Hideharu Miyahira	21 December 1973	10	–		13	5
Takanobu Okabe	26 October 1970	31	–		31	30
Hiroya Saitō	1 September 1970	19	21	4	20	32
Kazuya Yoshioka	9 September 1978	12	30	19	12	14
Kazakhstan (2)
Kayrat Biekenov	25 May 1972	–	–		q	q
Jurij Rulew	8 December 1978	–	–		q	q
Germany (7)
Christof Duffner	16 December 1971	27	15	21	39	38
Sven Hannawald	9 November 1974	6	3	3	7	8
Alexander Herr	4 October 1978	30	–		17	27
Ronny Hornschuh	2 February 1975	21	11	50	43	15
Hansjörg Jäkle	19 October 1971	25	18	8	25	36
Gerd Siegmund	7 February 1973	35	12	17	35	29
Dieter Thoma	19 October 1969	15	43	5	10	18
Norway (7)
Morten Ågheim	20 July 1980	7	–		21	43
Kristian Brenden	12 June 1976	17	1	10	38	21
Tommy Ingebrigtsen	8 August 1977	20	–		3	6
Christian Meyer	22 October 1977	27	–		6	17
Lasse Ottesen	8 April 1974	18	22	20	22	24
Marius Småriset	3 May 1977	–	–		q	26
Henning Stensrud	20 August 1977	42	13	33	18	20
Poland (14)
Wojciech Babiarz	4 July 1981	–	–		q	q
Mirosław Białobrzeski	1980	–	–		q	q
Krystian Długopolski	3 August 1980	–	q	q	q	48
Marek Gwóźdź	24 May 1977	–	q	–	48	q
Łukasz Kruczek	1 November 1975	–	q	45	37	25
Jakub Krysta	1983	–	–		q	q
Rafał Kuchta	19 October 1980	–	–		q	q
Adam Małysz	3 December 1977	–	23	29	27	23
Robert Mateja	5 October 1974	–	6	23	28	16
Andrzej Młynarczyk	1973	–	q	49	32	46
Krzysztof Mroczkowski	1978	–	–		q	q
Bartłomiej Nikiel	8 July 1983	–	–		q	q
Wojciech Skupień	9 March 1976	49	28	26	36	41
Wojciech Tajner	24 June 1980	–	–		q	q
Slovakia (4)
Marián Bielčík	27 August 1973	–	q	q	49	q
Martin Mesík	17 October 1979	–	48	q	46	44
Dušan Oršula	23 August 1979	–	q	q	q	q
Michal Pšenko	8 July 1982	–	–		44	q
Slovenia (5)
Damjan Fras	21 February 1973	45	–		q	47
Rolando Kaligaro	22 March 1976	–	–		33	42
Primož Peterka	28 February 1979	26	17	1	30	q
Primož Urh-Zupan	22 January 1983	–	–		23	37
Peter Žonta	9 January 1979	38	50	34	16	9
Sweden (1)
Kristoffer Jåfs	30 July 1980	47	–		q	35
Ukraine (3)
Ivan Kozlov	6 May 1978	–	q	q	42	q
Yuri Mykytynec	12 November 1974	–	q	q	q	q
Piotr Warwaruk	1981	–	–		q	q

Legend:

q – athlete did not qualify for the competition;
- – athlete was not registered for the qualification.
