= Ski jumping at the 1998 Winter Olympics – Large hill individual =

Men's large hill individual at the XVIII Olympic Winter Games
- Venue: Hakuba Ski Jumping Stadium
- Dates: February 15, 1998
- Competitors: 62 from 19 nations
- winning score: 272.3

Medalists
1st place, gold medalist(s)		Kazuyoshi Funaki; Japan
2nd place, silver medalist(s)		Jani Soininen; Finland
3rd place, bronze medalist(s)		Masahiko Harada; Japan

The men's large hill individual ski jumping competition for the 1998 Winter Olympics was held in Hakuba Ski Jumping Stadium. It occurred on 15 February.

== Results ==
The top 30 ranked athletes after the first jump advanced to the second jump.

				Round 1			Round 2			Total
Rank	Bib	Athlete	Country	Distance (m)	Points	Rank	Distance (m)	Points	Rank	Points
1st place, gold medalist(s)	62	Kazuyoshi Funaki	Japan	126.0	129.8	4	132.5	142.5	1	272.3
2nd place, silver medalist(s)	59	Jani Soininen	Finland	129.5	130.6	3	126.5	130.2	7	260.8
3rd place, bronze medalist(s)	60	Masahiko Harada	Japan	120.0	117.0	6	136.0	141.3	2	258.3
4	58	Andreas Widhölzl	Austria	131.0	138.8	1	120.5	119.4	14	258.2
5	57	Primož Peterka	Slovenia	119.0	115.2	8	130.5	135.9	3	251.1
6	39	Takanobu Okabe	Japan	130.0	134.0	2	119.5	116.1	17	250.1
7	46	Reinhard Schwarzenberger	Austria	115.5	108.4	16	131.0	135.8	4	244.2
8	37	Michal Doležal	Czech Republic	116.0	107.8	18	130.5	135.4	5	243.2
9	41	Roar Ljøkelsøy	Norway	119.5	116.6	7	124.0	125.7	10	242.3
10	44	Lasse Ottesen	Norway	121.0	118.8	5	122.0	120.1	12	238.9
11	29	Wojciech Skupień	Poland	117.0	111.1	12	125.5	126.4	9	237.5
12	61	Dieter Thoma	Germany	114.0	105.2	22	128.0	130.4	6	235.6
13	51	Kristian Brenden	Norway	113.0	104.4	24	127.0	130.1	8	234.5
14	42	Martin Schmitt	Germany	118.5	112.3	11	123.0	121.4	11	233.7
15	31	Jakub Sucháček	Czech Republic	117.5	111.0	13	121.0	118.3	15	229.3
16	38	Nicolas Dessum	France	118.5	113.3	10	119.0	115.2	18	228.5
17	26	Blaž Vrhovnik	Slovenia	116.0	107.3	20	122.5	119.5	13	226.8
18	45	Mika Laitinen	Finland	119.5	114.6	9	115.0	107.9	22	222.5
19	36	Bruno Reuteler	Switzerland	115.5	105.9	21	120.5	116.4	16	222.3
20	40	Robert Mateja	Poland	116.5	107.7	19	118.0	111.9	19	219.6
21	27	Jérôme Gay	France	115.5	107.9	17	118.0	111.4	20	219.3
22	34	Roberto Cecon	Italy	116.0	109.8	14	116.0	107.8	23	217.6
23	16	Artur Khamidulin	Russia	117.0	109.6	15	117.0	107.6	24	217.2
24	35	František Jež	Czech Republic	113.5	104.3	25	113.0	104.4	25	208.7
25	14	Stanislav Filimonov	Kazakhstan	111.0	98.3	27	116.0	108.3	21	206.6
26	24	Martin Mesík	Slovakia	112.0	101.6	26	110.5	96.4	26	198.0
27	8	Aleksandr Volkov	Russia	111.0	98.3	27	101.5	81.2	27	179.5
28	30	Peter Žonta	Slovenia	114.5	105.1	23	98.5	73.3	29	178.4
29	18	Volodymyr Hlyvka	Ukraine	109.0	94.7	30	98.5	73.8	28	168.5
30	22	Casey Colby	United States	109.0	96.2	29	97.0	69.6	30	165.8
31	47	Ari-Pekka Nikkola	Finland	108.5	94.3	31				
32	7	Aleksandr Sinyavsky	Belarus	109.0	94.2	32				
33	19	Marco Steinauer	Switzerland	108.0	93.9	33				
34	25	Miha Rihtar	Slovenia	108.0	93.4	34				
35	33	Valery Kobelev	Russia	108.0	92.9	35				
36	13	Ivan Kozlov	Ukraine	108.0	91.9	36				
37	55	Janne Ahonen	Finland	106.0	91.3	37				
38	50	Henning Stensrud	Norway	106.5	89.7	38				
39	28	Simon Ammann	Switzerland	106.0	89.3	39				
40	23	Choi Heung-Chul	South Korea	107.0	89.1	40				
41	43	Sylvain Freiholz	Switzerland	106.0	88.8	41				
42	2	Pavel Gayduk	Kazakhstan	104.5	87.1	42				
43	49	Martin Höllwarth	Austria	104.5	86.6	43				
44	10	Alan Alborn	United States	102.5	82.5	44				
45	11	Łukasz Kruczek	Poland	102.0	81.6	45				
46	6	Aleksandr Kolmakov	Kazakhstan	101.5	80.7	46				
47	54	Hiroya Saito	Japan	100.5	79.5	47				
48	56	Sven Hannawald	Germany	98.5	78.0	48				
49	9	Dmitry Chvykov	Kazakhstan	98.0	76.2	49				
50	21	Randy Weber	United States	97.0	75.3	50				
51	17	Kim Hyun-Ki	South Korea	98.0	72.9	51				
52	32	Adam Małysz	Poland	97.0	71.1	52				
53	3	Choi Yong-Jik	South Korea	94.5	66.6	53				
54	4	Nikolay Petrushin	Russia	94.5	66.1	54				
55	20	Aleksey Shibko	Belarus	94.5	65.1	55				
56	48	Jaroslav Sakala	Czech Republic	91.5	61.2	56				
57	52	Hansjörg Jäkle	Germany	92.0	61.1	57				
58	1	Brendan Doran	United States	91.5	58.7	58				
59	15	Kakha Tsakadze	Georgia	89.5	52.6	59				
60	53	Stefan Horngacher	Austria	84.0	41.2	60				
61	5	Liubym Kohan	Ukraine	79.0	35.2	61				
62	12	Kim Heung-Soo	South Korea	70.5	9.9	62				
