= Ski jumping at the 1998 Winter Olympics – Normal hill individual =

Men's normal hill individual at the XVIII Olympic Winter Games
- Pictogram for ski jumping
- Venue: Hakuba Ski Jumping Stadium
- Dates: February 11, 1998
- Competitors: 62 from 19 nations
- winning score: 234.5

Medalists
1st place, gold medalist(s)		Jani Soininen; Finland
2nd place, silver medalist(s)		Kazuyoshi Funaki; Japan
3rd place, bronze medalist(s)		Andreas Widhölzl; Austria

The men's normal hill individual ski jumping competition for the 1998 Winter Olympics was held in Hakuba Ski Jumping Stadium. It occurred on 11 February.

== Results ==
The top 30 ranked athletes after the first jump advanced to the second jump.

				Round 1			Round 2			Total
Rank	Bib	Athlete	Country	Distance (m)	Points	Rank	Distance (m)	Points	Rank	Points
1st place, gold medalist(s)	59	Jani Soininen	Finland	90.0	118.5	2	89.0	116.0	4	234.5
2nd place, silver medalist(s)	62	Kazuyoshi Funaki	Japan	87.5	114.0	4	90.5	119.5	2	233.5
3rd place, bronze medalist(s)	58	Andreas Widhölzl	Austria	88.0	114.5	3	90.5	118.0	3	232.5
4	55	Janne Ahonen	Finland	86.5	110.0	8	91.5	121.5	1	231.5
5	60	Masahiko Harada	Japan	91.5	121.0	1	84.5	107.5	8	228.5
6	57	Primož Peterka	Slovenia	87.0	109.0	9	89.0	114.0	5	223.0
7	50	Noriaki Kasai	Japan	87.5	113.5	5	84.5	108.0	7	221.5
8	51	Kristian Brenden	Norway	87.5	112.0	6	84.0	103.5	12	215.5
9	54	Hiroya Saito	Japan	86.5	110.5	7	83.0	103.0	14	213.5
10	53	Stefan Horngacher	Austria	85.0	107.0	11	84.5	105.5	9	212.5
11	45	Reinhard Schwarzenberger	Austria	86.0	109.0	9	83.0	102.0	16	211.0
11	38	Michal Doležal	Czech Republic	81.5	98.5	20	87.5	112.5	6	211.0
13	61	Dieter Thoma	Germany	84.5	106.0	12	83.0	102.5	15	208.5
14	56	Sven Hannawald	Germany	83.5	103.0	13	84.0	104.5	10	207.5
15	46	Ari-Pekka Nikkola	Finland	83.0	101.5	15	83.5	104.0	11	205.5
16	39	Nicolas Dessum	France	83.0	101.5	15	82.5	100.5	18	202.0
17	52	Hansjörg Jäkle	Germany	82.0	99.5	19	82.5	101.0	17	200.5
18	36	Bruno Reuteler	Switzerland	81.0	96.5	23	84.0	103.5	12	200.0
19	42	Martin Schmitt	Germany	82.0	100.0	18	82.0	99.5	19	199.5
20	44	Mika Laitinen	Finland	82.5	100.5	17	81.5	98.5	22	199.0
21	40	Robert Mateja	Poland	81.5	98.0	21	82.0	99.5	19	197.5
22	48	Andreas Goldberger	Austria	81.0	97.5	22	81.5	99.0	21	196.5
23	49	Henning Stensrud	Norway	81.0	96.0	24	81.0	97.0	23	193.0
24	35	František Jež	Czech Republic	83.5	103.0	13	77.5	89.5	29	192.5
25	12	Artur Khamidulin	Russia	78.5	90.5	26	80.5	96.0	24	186.5
26	47	Jaroslav Sakala	Czech Republic	77.5	89.0	28	80.5	96.0	24	185.0
27	15	Aleksandr Volkov	Russia	78.0	90.5	26	79.5	93.5	28	184.0
28	31	Jakub Sucháček	Czech Republic	77.5	87.5	29	81.0	96.0	24	183.5
29	43	Sylvain Freiholz	Switzerland	76.0	86.0	30	80.5	96.0	24	182.0
30	8	Dmitry Chvykov	Kazakhstan	79.0	93.5	25	75.0	83.5	30	177.0
31	9	Ivan Kozlov	Ukraine	76.0	85.5	31				85.5
32	4	Stanislav Filimonov	Kazakhstan	75.5	85.0	32				85.0
32	28	Wojciech Skupień	Poland	76.0	85.0	32				85.0
32	34	Roberto Cecon	Italy	75.5	85.0	32				85.0
35	27	Simon Ammann	Switzerland	75.0	83.5	35				83.5
36	37	Espen Bredesen	Norway	74.5	82.5	36				82.5
37	26	Jérôme Gay	France	74.0	82.0	37				82.0
38	25	Blaž Vrhovnik	Slovenia	74.5	81.0	38				81.0
39	30	Peter Žonta	Slovenia	74.0	80.5	39				80.5
40	19	Aleksey Shibko	Belarus	74.0	80.0	40				80.0
40	41	Roar Ljøkelsøy	Norway	74.0	80.0	40				80.0
42	2	Nikolay Petrushin	Russia	73.5	79.5	42				79.5
42	3	Alan Alborn	United States	74.0	79.5	42				79.5
42	22	Casey Colby	United States	73.0	79.5	42				79.5
42	29	Urban Franc	Slovenia	74.0	79.5	42				79.5
46	23	Choi Heung-Chul	South Korea	73.0	77.5	46				77.5
47	11	Volodymyr Hlyvka	Ukraine	73.0	77.0	47				77.0
48	5	Pavel Gayduk	Kazakhstan	72.0	76.5	48				76.5
49	21	Randy Weber	United States	71.0	74.5	49				74.5
50	16	Aleksandr Sinyavsky	Belarus	70.0	71.5	50				71.5
51	32	Adam Małysz	Poland	69.5	70.5	51				70.5
52	17	Brendan Doran	United States	68.5	69.5	52				69.5
53	7	Choi Yong-Jik	South Korea	69.0	69.0	53				69.0
54	33	Valery Kobelev	Russia	68.0	68.0	54				68.0
55	14	Kakha Tsakadze	Georgia	69.0	66.5	55				66.5
56	1	Liubym Kohan	Ukraine	67.5	63.5	56				63.5
56	18	Marco Steinauer	Switzerland	66.0	63.5	56				63.5
58	13	Aleksandr Kolmakov	Kazakhstan	67.5	63.0	58				63.0
59	6	Kim Hyeon-Gi	South Korea	65.5	61.5	59				61.5
60	24	Martin Mesík	Slovakia	65.0	61.0	60				61.0
61	10	Kim Heung-soo	South Korea	64.5	59.5	61				59.5
62	20	Krystian Długopolski	Poland	61.0	45.0	62				45.0
