= Ski jumping at the 2002 Winter Olympics – Normal hill individual =

Men's normal hill individual at the XIX Olympic Winter Games
- Pictogram for ski jumping
- Venue: Park City
- Dates: February 10, 2002
- Competitors: 60 from 21 nations
- winning score: 269.0

Medalists
1st place, gold medalist(s)		Simon Ammann; Switzerland
2nd place, silver medalist(s)		Sven Hannawald; Germany
3rd place, bronze medalist(s)		Adam Małysz; Poland

The men's normal hill individual ski jumping competition for the 2002 Winter Olympics was held in Park City, Utah. Both qualifying and the final rounds took place on 10 February 2002 after heavy wind caused a cancellation of the qualifying round on 9 February 2002.

== Results ==
=== Qualifying ===
Twelve skiers were pre-qualified, on the basis of their World Cup performance, meaning that they directly advanced to the final round. These skiers still jumped in the qualifying round, but they were not included with non-pre-qualified skiers in the standings. The fifty-four skiers who were not pre-qualified competed for thirty-eight spots in the final round.

Rank	Name	Country	Score	Notes
1	Janne Ahonen	Finland	125.0	
2	Robert Kranjec	Slovenia	122.0	
2	Primož Peterka	Slovenia	122.0	
4	Toni Nieminen	Finland	119.0	
5	Valery Kobelev	Russia	118.0	
5	Michael Uhrmann	Germany	118.0	
7	Christof Duffner	Germany	117.5	
7	Nicolas Dessum	France	117.5	
9	Anders Bardal	Norway	116.0	
10	Robert Mateja	Poland	115.5	
11	Alan Alborn	United States	114.5	
11	Masahiko Harada	Japan	114.5	
13	Veli-Matti Lindström	Finland	114.0	
13	Andreas Küttel	Switzerland	114.0	
15	Sylvain Freiholz	Switzerland	112.0	
16	Stanislav Filimonov	Kazakhstan	111.5	
17	Choi Yong-Jik	South Korea	111.0	
18	Tommy Ingebrigtsen	Norway	110.5	
19	Jan Mazoch	Czech Republic	110.0	
20	Lars Bystøl	Norway	109.5	
21	Roar Ljøkelsøy	Norway	109.0	
22	Tomasz Pochwała	Poland	108.5	
23	Damjan Fras	Slovenia	108.0	
24	Maxim Polunin	Kazakhstan	106.5	
24	Kim Hyun-Ki	South Korea	106.5	
26	Choi Heung-Chul	South Korea	105.5	
27	Dmitry Chvykov	Kyrgyzstan	104.0	
28	Hiroki Yamada	Japan	103.0	
29	Noriaki Kasai	Japan	101.5	
29	Kang Chil-Gu	South Korea	101.5	
31	Wojciech Skupień	Poland	97.0	
32	Jan Matura	Czech Republic	95.5	
33	Andrey Lyskovets	Belarus	95.0	
33	Jakub Janda	Czech Republic	92.5	
35	Pavel Gayduk	Kazakhstan	92.0	
36	Michal Doležal	Czech Republic	91.5	
36	Brendan Doran	United States	91.5	
38	Aleksandr Korobov	Kazakhstan	90.5	
39	Clint Jones	United States	89.5	
39	Brian Welch	United States	89.5	
41	Ildar Fatkullin	Russia	89.0	
42	Aleksandr Belov	Russia	88.5	
43	Glynn Pedersen	Great Britain	88.0	
44	Jaan Jüris	Estonia	79.0	
45	Georgi Zharkov	Bulgaria	76.5	
46	Kakha Tsakadze	Georgia	75.0	
47	Volodymyr Hlyvka	Ukraine	72.0	
48	Aleksey Silayev	Russia	56.0	
*	Sven Hannawald	Germany	133.0	
*	Simon Ammann	Switzerland	132.0	
*	Adam Małysz	Poland	128.0	
*	Kazuyoshi Funaki	Japan	124.5	
*	Matti Hautamäki	Finland	118.5	
*	Andreas Widhölzl	Austria	118.0	
*	Martin Schmitt	Germany	117.5	
*	Peter Žonta	Slovenia	116.5	
*	Martin Koch	Austria	114.5	
*	Martin Höllwarth	Austria	112.5	
*	Roberto Cecon	Italy	103.5	
*	Stefan Horngacher	Austria	102.0	

1: These skiers were pre-qualified; they did perform jumps in the qualification round, but were not ranked with the non-pre-qualified jumpers.

=== Final ===
The final consisted of two jumps, with the top thirty after the first jump qualifying for the second jump. The combined total of the two jumps was used to determine the final ranking.

Rank	Bib	Name	Country	Jump 1	Rank	Jump 2	Rank	Total
1st place, gold medalist(s)	53	Simon Ammann	Switzerland	133.5	1	135.5	2	269.0
2nd place, silver medalist(s)	59	Sven Hannawald	Germany	131.0	2	136.5	1	267.5
3rd place, bronze medalist(s)	60	Adam Małysz	Poland	129.5	3	133.5	3	263.0
4	42	Janne Ahonen	Finland	128.0	4	133.5	3	261.5
5	47	Veli-Matti Lindström	Finland	126.5	5	126.5	7	253.0
6	57	Matti Hautamäki	Finland	121.5	7	131.0	5	252.5
7	55	Martin Schmitt	Germany	125.5	6	124.5	9	250.0
8	35	Michael Uhrmann	Germany	118.0	12	127.0	6	245.0
9	51	Kazuyoshi Funaki	Japan	119.5	10	123.5	10	243.0
10	36	Primož Peterka	Slovenia	121.5	7	119.0	13	240.5
11	46	Alan Alborn	United States	118.0	12	122.0	12	240.0
11	52	Stefan Horngacher	Austria	117.5	14	122.5	11	240.0
13	50	Peter Žonta	Slovenia	114.0	24	125.5	8	239.5
14	54	Martin Koch	Austria	120.5	9	116.5	19	237.0
15	43	Robert Kranjec	Slovenia	117.5	14	118.5	14	236.0
16	41	Toni Nieminen	Finland	117.0	18	118.5	14	235.5
17	40	Christof Duffner	Germany	117.5	14	117.5	16	235.0
18	32	Roar Ljøkelsøy	Norway	119.0	11	114.5	24	233.5
19	49	Roberto Cecon	Italy	117.0	18	116.0	20	233.0
20	34	Masahiko Harada	Japan	117.5	14	114.5	24	232.0
20		Tommy Ingebrigtsen	Norway	116.5	20	115.5	21	232.0
22		Nicolas Dessum	France	114.0	24	117.5	16	231.5
22		Andreas Küttel	Switzerland	114.0	24	117.5	16	231.5
24	58	Andreas Widhölzl	Austria	115.0	22	115.5	21	230.5
25		Sylvain Freiholz	Switzerland	113.0	27	115.0	23	228.0
25	56	Martin Höllwarth	Austria	115.0	22	113.0	28	228.0
27		Anders Bardal	Norway	116.5	20	110.5	29	227.0
28		Damjan Fras	Slovenia	110.5	30	114.5	24	225.0
29	48	Valery Kobelev	Russia	111.0	29	113.5	27	224.5
30		Choi Heung-Chul	South Korea	110.5	30	105.5	30	216.0
31		Lars Bystøl	Norway	110.5	30	104.5	31	215.0
32		Stanislav Filimonov	Kazakhstan	111.5	28	98.0	32	209.5
33	44	Hiroki Yamada	Japan	109.5	33	—	—	
34		Choi Yong-Jik	South Korea	109.0	34	—	—	
35		Jan Mazoch	Czech Republic	108.5	35	—	—	
36		Kim Hyun-Ki	South Korea	106.0	36	—	—	
37		Robert Mateja	Poland	104.5	37	—	—	
38		Maxim Polunin	Kazakhstan	103.5	38	—	—	
39		Jakub Janda	Czech Republic	103.0	39	—	—	
40		Tomasz Pochwała	Poland	102.0	40	—	—	
41		Dmitry Chvykov	Kyrgyzstan	101.5	41	—	—	
42		Andrey Lyskovets	Belarus	98.0	42	—	—	
42		Wojciech Skupień	Poland	98.0	42	—	—	
44		Brendan Doran	United States	96.5	44	—	—	
44		Pavel Gayduk	Kazakhstan	96.5	44	—	—	
46		Kang Chil-Gu	South Korea	96.0	46	—	—	
47		Jan Matura	Czech Republic	91.5	47	—	—	
48		Aleksandr Korobov	Kazakhstan	85.5	48	—	—	
49	45	Noriaki Kasai	Japan	83.0	49	—	—	
50		Michal Doležal	Czech Republic	82.5	50	—	—	
