= Hakola =

Hakola is a surname. Notable people with the surname include:

- Juha Hakola (born 1987), Finnish footballer
- Kimmo Hakola (born 1958), Finnish composer
- Lauri Hakola (born 1979), Finnish ski jumper
- Ristomatti Hakola (born 1991), Finnish cross-country skier
- Theo Hakola (born 1954), American musician and writer
