= Keuler =

Keuler is a surname. Notable people with the surname include:

- Carsten Keuler (born 1971), German footballer
- Mike Keuler (born 1978), American ski jumper
