= Petrushin =

Petrushin (masculine), Petrushina (feminine) is a Russian-language surname. Notable people with the surname include:

- Aleksei Petrushin (born 1952), Russian footballer
- Sergey Petrushin, Russian entrepreneur
- Nikolay Petrushin (born 1979), Russian ski jumper
- Kristina Petrushina (born 1997), Russian - Swedish comedian and presenter .
- Tatiana Petrushina (born 1990), Russian basketball player
