= Lepistö =

Lepistö is a Finnish surname. Notable people with the surname include:

- Laura Lepistö (born 1988), Finnish figure skater
- Sami Lepistö (born 1984), Finnish ice hockey player
- Hannu Lepistö (born 1946), Finnish ski jumping coach
