= Aleksandr Korobov =

Kazakhstani ski jumper

Personal information
- Nationality: Kazakhstani
- Born: 1 April 1978 (age 47) Almaty, Kazakhstan

Sport
- Sport: Ski jumping

Aleksandr Korobov (Александр Николаевич Коробов, born 1 April 1978) is a Kazakhstani ski jumper. He competed in the normal hill and large hill events at the 2002 Winter Olympics.
