= Liubym Kohan =

Ukrainian ski jumper

Personal information
- Nationality: Ukrainian
- Born: 2 July 1975 (age 49); Chernivtsi, Ukrainian SSR, Soviet Union

Sport
- Sport: Ski jumping

Liubym Kohan (born 2 July 1975) is a Ukrainian ski jumper. He competed in the normal hill and large hill events at the 1998 Winter Olympics.
