= Aleksey Shibko =

Belarusian ski jumper

Personal information
- Nationality: Belarusian
- Born: 27 September 1977 (age 47)

Sport
- Sport: Ski jumping

Aleksey Shibko (born 27 September 1977) is a Belarusian ski jumper. He competed in the normal hill and large hill events at the 1998 Winter Olympics.
