= Hornschuh =

Hornschuh is a surname. Notable people with the surname include:

- Marc Hornschuh (born 1991), German footballer
- Ronny Hornschuh (born 1975), German ski jumper
