= Morten Ågheim =

Norwegian ski jumper

Morten Ågheim (20 July 1980 – 8 June 2017) was a Norwegian ski jumper.

He made his FIS Alpine Ski World Cup debut in November 1997 in Lillehammer, where he also collected his first World Cup points with a 22nd-place finish. In the ski flying event at Planica in March 1998 he finished 22nd again, then 16th the next day. In the 1998–99 season he broke the top 10 for the first time, managing nine top-10 positions throughout the season, including twice at the 1998-99 Four Hills Tournament. His best individual result was a 4th-place finish in Harrachov on 20 December 1998. However, in the following years he only broke the top 20 on one occasion, in December 1999 in Predazzo. His last World Cup outing came in March 2001 during the Holmenkollen ski festival.

He represented the sports club Åga IL.
