= Janne Väätäinen =

Finnish former ski jumper (born 1975)

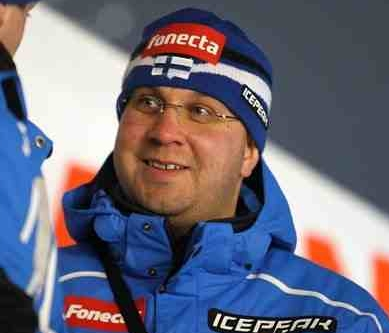
- FIS Ski Jumping World Cup Zakopane 2010

Personal information
- Full name: Janne Henrik Väätäinen
- Born: 6 March 1975 (age 51) Kuopio, Finland

Sport
- Sport: Ski jumping
Medal record
Nordic Junior Championships
| Gold medal – first place | 1992 Vuokatti | Normal Hill Team, Men |
| Silver medal – second place | 1991 Reit im Winkl | Normal Hill Team, Men |

Janne Henrik Väätäinen (born 6 March 1975, in Kuopio) is a Finnish former ski jumper who competed from 1992 to 2001. At the 1994 Winter Olympics in Lillehammer, he finished fifth in the team large hill and 30th in the individual normal hill events.

Väätäinen's best finish at the Ski-flying World Championships was 14th at Planica in 1994. His best World Cup career finish was third in an individual normal hill event in Finland in 1996.
