= Christian Meyer (ski jumper) =

Norwegian ski jumper

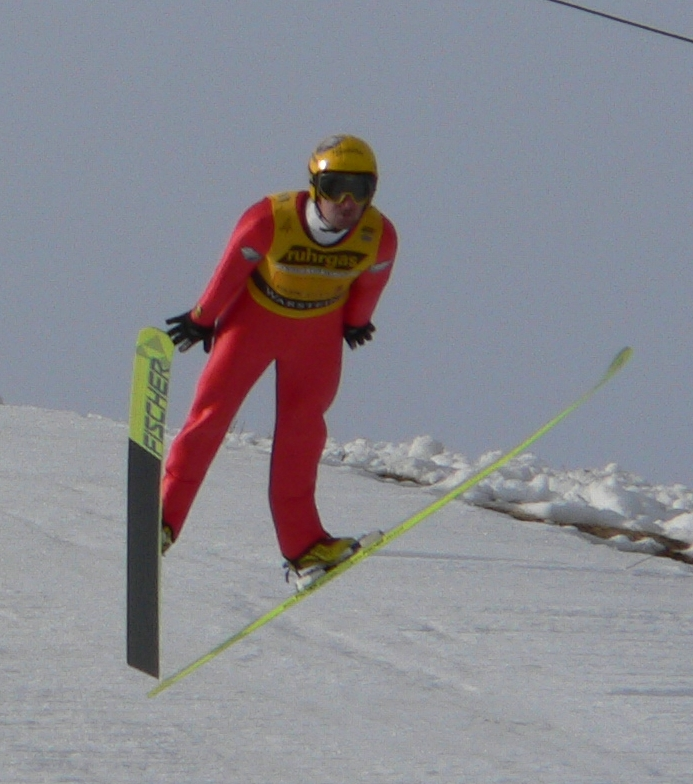

Personal information
- Born: 22 October 1977 (age 48) Orkdal Municipality

Sport
- Sport: Skiing
- Club: Selbu IL; Trønderhopp

World Cup career
- Seasons: 1997-1999
- Indiv. podiums: 0
- Indiv. wins: 0

Achievements and titles
- Personal bests: 166,5 m (Kulm, 9th Februar 1997)
- Updated on 13 May 2025

Christian Meyer (born 22 October 1977 in Orkdal Municipality) is a retired Norwegian ski jumper and actual trainer.

== Career ==
=== Ski jumper ===
Meyer started from 1994 until 2004 in the FIS Ski Jumping Continental Cup, where he won in Vikersund on 14 March 1997. On 8 February 1998 he debuted in the World Cup. Meyer finished once among the top 10, with a sixth place in Zakopane on 16 January 1999.

In 2003 Meyer became the Norwegian national champion. In singles competition he won the silver medal in 1999 (ex aequo with Roar Ljøkelsøy).

=== Coach ===
Since 2006 Meyer hab been a skijumping coach. After being responsible as a co-trainer for the youth national team he replaced Frode Håre as the coach of the female Norwegian team in summer 2011. In March 2024 the male norwegian jumpers asked him to substitute Alexander Stöckl as their head coach, but Meyer refused.

== Private life ==
Meyer has also worked as a guitar player. Since 1995 he has lived in a relationship with Elisabeth Hilmo. Both married in 2011 and have two sons. The family is located in the Malvik Municipality
