= Ivan Kozlov (ski jumper) =

Ukrainian ski jumper

Personal information
- Nationality: Ukrainian
- Born: 6 May 1978 (age 46); Kyiv, Ukrainian SSR, Soviet Union

Sport
- Sport: Ski jumping

Ivan Kozlov (born 6 May 1978) is a Ukrainian ski jumper. He competed in the normal hill and large hill events at the 1998 Winter Olympics.
