= Kim Heung-soo (ski jumper) =

South Korean ski jumper

Personal information
- Nationality: South Korean
- Born: 4 October 1980 (age 44)

Sport
- Sport: Ski jumping

Kim Heung-soo (born 4 October 1980) is a South Korean ski jumper. He competed in the normal hill and large hill events at the 1998 Winter Olympics.
