= Miha Rihtar =

Slovenian ski jumper

Personal information
- Nationality: Slovenian
- Born: 4 March 1981 (age 44); Ljubljana, Yugoslavia

Sport
- Sport: Ski jumping

Miha Rihtar (born 4 March 1981) is a retired Slovenian ski jumper. He competed in the large hill event at the 1998 Winter Olympics.
