= Aleksandr Volkov (ski jumper) =

Russian ski jumper

Personal information
- Nationality: Russian
- Born: 28 March 1978 (age 46); Kirov, Russia

Sport
- Sport: Ski jumping

Aleksandr Volkov (born 28 March 1978) is a Russian ski jumper. He competed in the normal hill and large hill events at the 1998 Winter Olympics.
