= Hannu Lepistö =

Finnish ski jumping coach

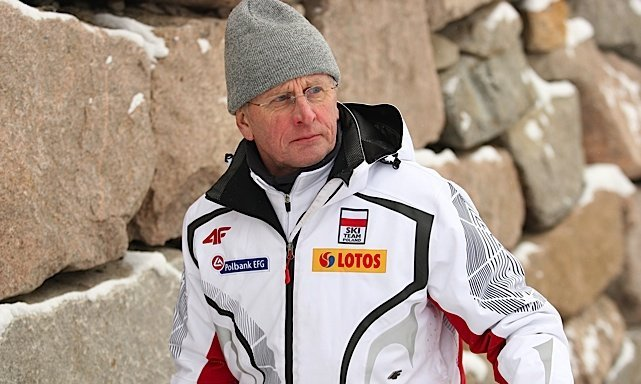
Hannu Lepistö in 2011 in Oslo

Hannu Lepistö (sometimes spelled Hannu Lepistoe; born 17 May 1946) is a Finnish former ski jumping coach.

In 2010 he was awarded the Knight's Cross of the Polish Order of Polonia Restituta.

He retired on in March 2011.

== Private life ==
Lepistö's residence is in Lahti, Finland.

== Teams and ski jumpers trained by Lepistö ==
- 1980–1985 Finland A-team
- 1985–1992 Italy A-team
- 1994–1998 Finland A-team
- 2002–2004 Austria national team
- 2004–2006 Italy A-team
- 2006–2008 Poland A-team
- 2009–2011 Adam Małysz
