= Lauri Hakola =

Finnish ski jumper

Lauri Hakola (born 13 December 1979 in Oulu) is a Finnish former ski jumper. He currently resides in Kuopio, where he is a student, and plays tennis in his spare time.

Hakola competed at the World Cup level seven times, mostly at events held in Finland. His best finish was tenth in the opening event of the 2006–07 season, in which the top athletes were hampered by poor weather conditions. He also won a silver medal in the team competition of the World Junior Championships.
