= Łukasz Kruczek =

Polish ski jumper

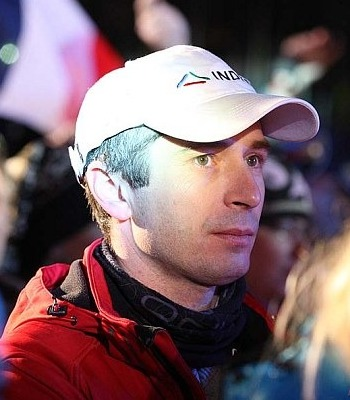

Personal information
- Full name: Łukasz Paweł Kruczek
- Born: 1 November 1975 (age 50) Buczkowice, Poland

Sport
- Sport: Skiing
- Club: AZS-AWF Katowice

World Cup career
- Seasons: 1994–2003

Achievements and titles
- Personal bests: 186 m (610 ft); Planica, 2001
Medal record
Men's ski jumping
Representing Poland
Universiade
Gold medal – first place	1997 Muju	Individual NH
Gold medal – first place	1999 Poprad	Individual NH
Gold medal – first place	2001 Zakopane	Individual NH
Gold medal – first place	2001 Zakopane	Individual NH
Bronze medal – third place	2003 Tarvisio	Team
- Updated on 20 February 2014

Łukasz Paweł Kruczek (born 1 November 1975) is a Polish former ski jumper. He represented Poland at the 1998 Winter Olympics in Nagano, and is a four-time gold medalist at Universiade. From 2008 till 2016 he has been the coach of the Polish national ski jumping team. Since 2016 he is the coach of the Italian national ski jumping team

== Personal life ==
Łukasz Kruczek was born in Buczkowice, Poland. He graduated from the Academy of Physical Education in Kraków. He has a wife Agata. They have three children - a daughter Anna and two sons - Michał and Kacper. He is fluent in three languages: English, German and Russian.

== Ski jumping career ==
Kruczek started ski jumping when was 6 years old. His first club was LKS Klimczok Bystra. Until 1994 he practiced Nordic combined. He was Polish Junior Champion in Nordic combined three times. He resigned from the Nordic combined, because it was not a popular sport in Poland. He debuted in ski jumping World Cup in 1996 in Zakopane. Kruczek's best finish at the FIS Nordic World Ski Championships was 32nd in the individual large hill event at Ramsau in 1999. He finished 46th at the 1996 Ski-flying World Championships in Bad Mitterndorf. He was at the Olympic Games 2002 in Salt Lake City, but did not start in any competition. He won four gold medals at the Universiade individually (1997, 1999, 2001) and one bronze with the team (2003). Kruczek's best World Cup career finish was 14th at a large hill event in Finland in 1999. He ended his career as a ski jumper after season 2002/2003.

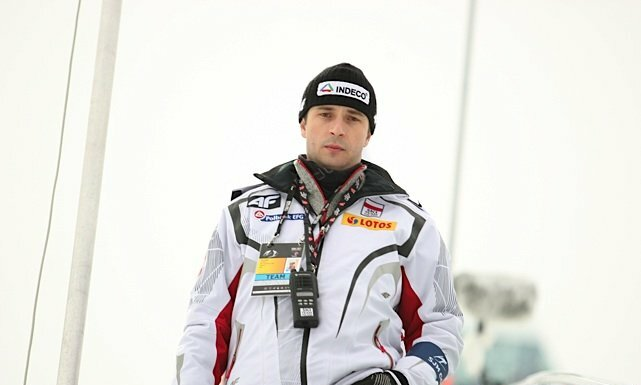
Kruczek in Oslo, 2011

== Coaching career ==
His career as a coach began when he was Heinz Kuttin's assistant (for two seasons). Then Kruczek worked with Hannu Lepistö. On March 28, 2008 he began working as coach of Polish national ski jumping team A. He was awarded the Silver Cross of Merit in 2010. His first successes as coach were Kamil Stoch's podium places in the World Cup in 2011. Polish team had a bad start to the season 2012/2013. Łukasz Kruczek was criticized and considered his expulsion from work. At that time, Kamil Stoch publicly supported the coach. At the World Championships 2013 in Val di Fiemme his ward Kamil Stoch became World Champion individually on the large hill, and the Polish team - Maciej Kot, Kamil Stoch, Piotr Żyła and Dawid Kubacki won bronze medal. Since then his jumpers occupy high positions in the World Cup and Summer Grand Prix. During his work as a trainer has 5 different Polish jumpers (Adam Małysz, Kamil Stoch, Jan Ziobro, Krzysztof Biegun and Piotr Żyła) was winning the World Cup competitions. In the season 2013/2014 Stoch is the leader of the World Cup. In 2014 Kamil Stoch was a double gold medalist at the Olympic Games 2014 in Sochi, Polish team was 4th. Kruczek led the Polish team for the best results at the Olympic Games in history.
