= Nikolay Petrushin =

Russian ski jumper

Personal information
- Nationality: Russian
- Born: 4 June 1979 (age 45); Leninogorsk, Russia

Sport
- Sport: Ski jumping

Nikolay Petrushin (born 4 June 1979) is a Russian ski jumper. He competed in the normal hill and large hill events at the 1998 Winter Olympics.
