= Mike Keuler =

American ski jumper

Michael Vincent Keuler (born July 25, 1978) is an American former ski jumper who competed in the 1998 Winter Olympics. He was born in Minneapolis, Minnesota.
