= Blaž Vrhovnik =

Slovenian ski jumper

Personal information
- Nationality: Slovenian
- Born: 8 May 1981 (age 43); Ljubljana, Yugoslavia

Sport
- Sport: Ski jumping

Blaž Vrhovnik (born 8 May 1981) is a Slovenian ski jumper. He competed in the normal hill and large hill events at the 1998 Winter Olympics.
