= Brendan Doran =

American former ski jumper

- Born: March 17, 1979 (age 47)
- Occupation: Ski jumper
- Known for: 1998 and 2002 Winter Olympics

Brendan Doran (born March 17, 1979) is an American former ski jumper who competed in the 1998 Winter Olympics and in the 2002 Winter Olympics. He was born in Long Beach, California.

He measures at 185 cm and is 73 kg.
