= Aleksandr Kolmakov =

Kazakh ski jumper (born 1966)

Personal information
- Nationality: Kazakhstani
- Born: 12 December 1966 (age 58)

Sport
- Sport: Ski jumping

Aleksandr Kolmakov (born 12 December 1966) is a Kazakhstani ski jumper. He competed at the 1994 Winter Olympics and the 1998 Winter Olympics.
