= Volodymyr Hlyvka =

Ukrainian ski jumper

Personal information
- Nationality: Ukrainian
- Born: 24 August 1973 (age 51); Lviv, Ukrainian SSR, Soviet Union

Sport
- Sport: Ski jumping

Volodymyr Hlyvka (born 24 August 1973) is a Ukrainian ski jumper. He competed at the 1998 Winter Olympics and the 2002 Winter Olympics.
