= Casey Colby =

American ski jumper (born 1974)

Casey Colby (born November 3, 1974, in Lake Placid, New York) is an American former ski jumper who competed in the 1998 Winter Olympics. After competing in the 1998 Nagano, Japan Winter Olympics, Casey went on to coach the U.S.A. women's ski jump team. He also jumped in the Opening Ceremonies for the 2002 Salt Lake City Winter Olympics. After finishing coaching around 2014, Casey began a career as a professional helicopter pilot.
