= Martin Mesík =

Slovak former ski jumper (born 1979)

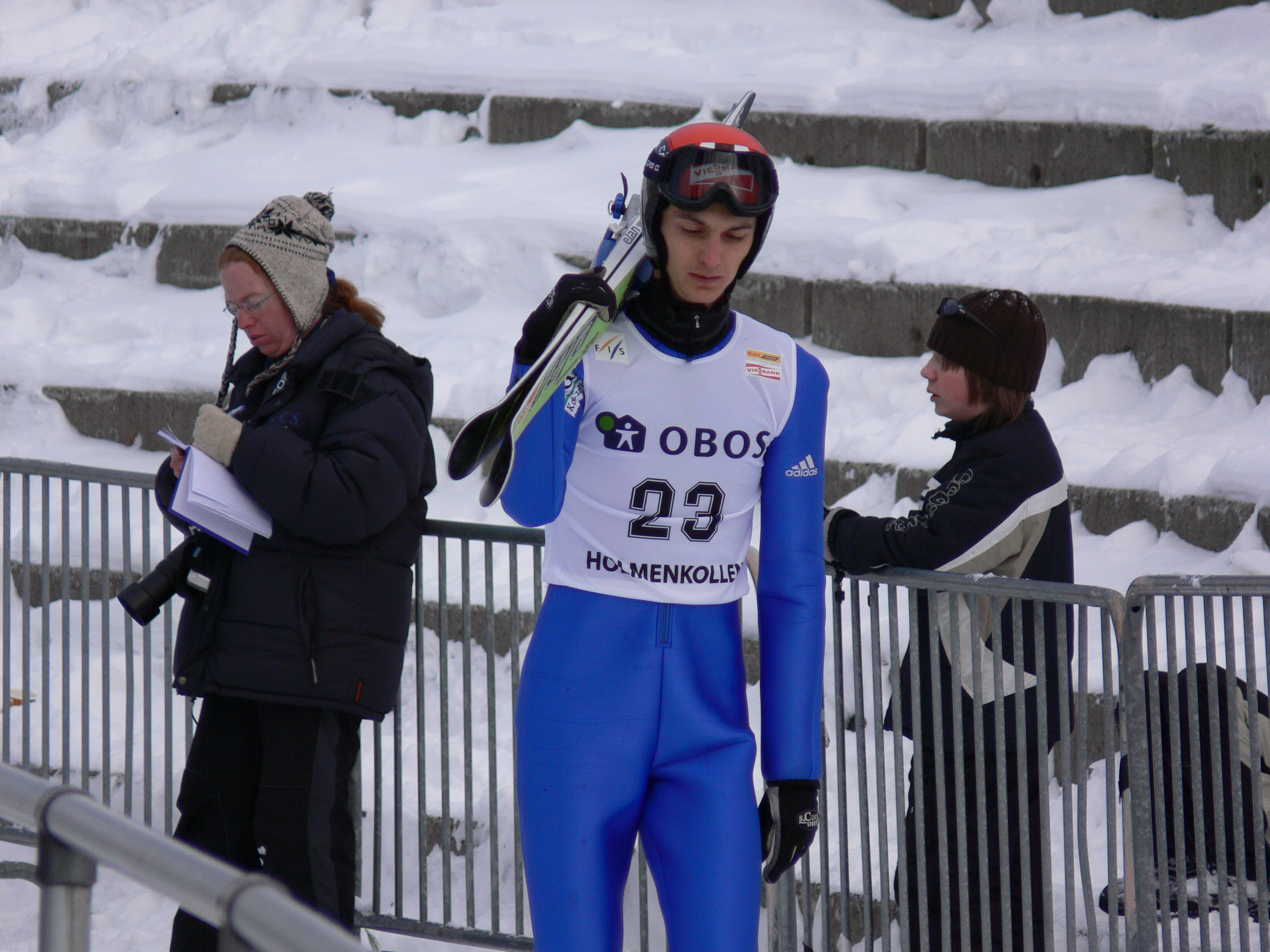

Personal information
- Born: 17 October 1979 (age 47) Banská Bystrica, Czechoslovakia

Sport
- Sport: Skiing
- Club: Vimar Banská Bystrica

World Cup career
- Seasons: 1996–2008
- Indiv. wins: 0

Achievements and titles
- Personal bests: 195.5 m (641 ft); Kulm, 2005

Martin Mesík (born 17 October 1979) is a Slovak former ski jumper who holds the Slovak national record with 195.5 m which he set at Kulm in February 2005. Mesík first competed at World Cup level in the 1995–96 season, and was for a long time the only Slovak ski jumper; he also had to train by himself. In 2007 he was joined by countryman Tomáš Zmoray. Mesík retired from ski jumping a year later and currently lives in Selce. During his active career he was 183 cm tall, and his weight was 64 kg.

He has competed twice in the Winter Olympics, nine times at the World Championships, and 90 times in the World Cup. His best World Cup placement was 16th place at Willingen in 2003. In the World Ski Championships in Trondheim 1997 he ended up on 20th place in the Large Hill competition.
