= Henning Stensrud =

Norwegian former ski jumper (born 1977)

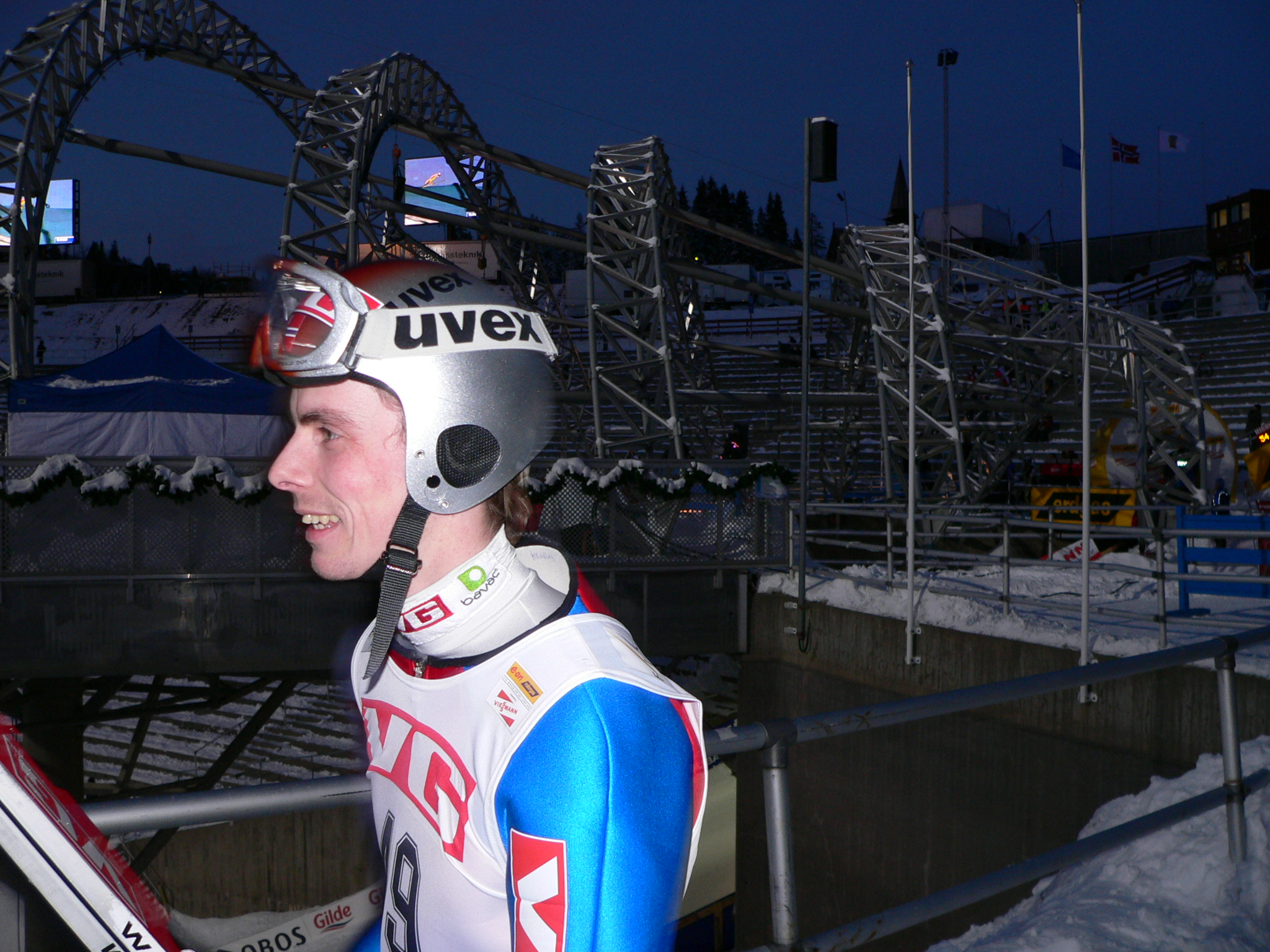

Personal information
- Full name: Henning Stensrud
- Born: 20 August 1977 (age 49) Lørenskog, Norway

Sport
- Sport: Skiing
- Club: Hurdal IL / Trønderhopp

World Cup career
- Seasons: 1996–2008
- Indiv. podiums: 0
- Indiv. wins: 0

Achievements and titles
- Personal bests: 226.5 m (743 ft); Planica, 20 Mar 2005

Henning Stensrud (born 20 August 1977) is a Norwegian former ski jumper who debuted with the Norwegian World Cup team in 1996. Fourth places in Engelberg (1997) and Oberstdorf (1998) were his career best individual results.

At the 1998 Winter Olympics in Nagano, Stensrud finished in the team large hill event, 23rd in the individual normal hill, and 38th in the individual large hill events. His best finish at the FIS Nordic World Ski Championships was eighth in the individual large hill event at Lahti in 2001. His lone World Cup victory was in a team large hill event in Lahti in 2005.

Stensrud retired after the 2007–08 World Cup season and currently resides in Trondheim.
