= Dmitriy Chvykov =

Kyrgyzstani ski jumper

Dmitriy Aleksandrovich Chvykov (Russian: Дмитрий Александрович Чвыков; born 14 October 1974 in Alma-Ata, Kazakh SSR) is a retired Kazakhstani-Kyrgyzstani ski jumper. He holds the Kyrgyz national record of 123 metres. He competed for the Bishkek Ski Club, and was the only Kyrgyz ski jumper on his level.

Chvykov competed in the Winter Olympics 1998 in Nagano and the Winter Olympics 2002 in Salt Lake City. In Nagano he was 30th on the normal hill and 49th on the large hill. In Salt Lake City he was 41st on the normal hill and 39th on the large hill. He also competed in the World Championships 2001 in Lahti, and was 31st on the normal hill. His best World Cup result is 31st place, at Engelberg in 2001. Chvykov retired after the 2002 Olympics.
