= Jakub Sucháček =

Czech former ski jumper (born 1978)

Jakub Sucháček (born 17 November 1978) is a Czech former ski jumper who competed from 1994 to 2001. At the 1998 Winter Olympics in Nagano, he finished seventh in the team large hill and 15th in the individual large hill events.

Sucháček's best finish at the FIS Nordic World Ski Championships was 11th in the large hill event at Ramsau in 1999. He finished ninth at the 1996 Ski-flying World Championships in Bad Mitterndorf.

Sucháček's best World Cup finish was second in a large hill event in Finland in 1995.
