= Hansjörg Jäkle =

German ski jumper (born 1971)

Personal information
- Nationality: Germany
- Born: 19 October 1971 (age 54) Schonach im Schwarzwald, West Germany

Sport
- Sport: Skiing

World Cup career
- Seasons: 1993–2002
- Indiv. podiums: 1
- Team podiums: 4
- Team wins: 2
Medal record
Men's ski jumping
Representing Germany
Olympic Games
Gold medal – first place	1994 Lillehammer	Team large hill
Silver medal – second place	1998 Nagano	Team large hill
World Championships
Silver medal – second place	1995 Thunder Bay	Team large hill
- Updated on 15 May 2015

Hansjörg Jäkle (born 19 October 1971) is a German former ski jumper who competed from 1993 to 2002. His career best achievement was winning a gold medal in the team large hill event at the 1994 Winter Olympics in Lillehammer. He also won a silver medal in the team large hill at the 1995 FIS Nordic World Ski Championships in Thunder Bay. His best individual finish at World Cup level was second in Bischofshofen on 6 January 1998.
