= Nicolas Dessum =

French former ski jumper

Personal information
- Nationality: France
- Born: 20 February 1977 (age 49) Lyon, France
- Height: 1.85 m (6 ft 1 in)

Sport
- Sport: Skiing

World Cup career
- Seasons: 1994–2005
- Indiv. starts: 203
- Indiv. podiums: 2
- Indiv. wins: 1
- Team starts: 9

Achievements and titles
- Personal bests: 207.5 m (681 ft); Planica, 20–23 March 2003
- Updated on 10 February 2016

Nicolas Dessum (born 20 February 1977) is a French former ski jumper.

== Career ==
His best finishes at the Winter Olympics occurred at Lillehammer in 1994 with a sixth in the team large hill and a 14th in the individual normal hill events. Dessum's best individual at the FIS Nordic World Ski Championships was fifth in the large hill at Trondheim in 1997. His best finish at the Ski-flying World Championships was 13th at Vikersund in 2000.

Dessum's only World Cup win was in a large hill event in Japan in 1995. Dessum retired from the World Cup in 2007 during the summer GP.

== World Cup ==
=== Standings ===
Season	Overall	4H	SF	NT	JP
1993/94	23	17	—	N/A	N/A
1994/95	12	5	—	N/A	N/A
1995/96	46	48	28	N/A	50
1996/97	18	15	26	26	17
1997/98	37	53	43	19	35
1998/99	14	19	11	13	15
1999/00	19	30	10	10	20
2000/01	46	35	33	26	N/A
2001/02	42	18	N/A	51	N/A
2002/03	64	57	N/A	33	N/A
2003/04	48	50	N/A	—	N/A
2004/05	58	36	N/A	—	N/A

=== Wins ===
No.	Season	Date	Location	Hill	Size
1	1994/95	22 January 1995	(Japan) Sapporo	Ōkurayama K115	LH
