= Marco Steinauer =

Swiss ski jumper

Marco Steinauer (born 13 April 1976) is a Swiss former ski jumper who competed from 1992 to 2006. At the 1998 Winter Olympics in Nagano, he finished sixth in the team large hill and 33rd in the individual large hill events.

At the FIS Nordic World Ski Championships, Steinauer earned his best overall finish of seventh in the team large hill event at Oberstdorf in 2005 and his best individual finish of 14th in the individual normal hill event at Thunder Bay in 1995. He finished 30th at the 2000 Ski-flying World Championships in Vikersund.

Steinauer's best World Cup finish was fourth twice, both in large hill events (1995, 1996).
