= Arthur Khamidulin =

Russian ski jumper (born 1977)

Arthur Khamidulin Артур Хамидулин
- Country: Russia
- Born: 30 April 1977 (age 48); Russia
- Height: 1.72 m (5 ft 8 in)

World Cup career
- Seasons: 1997–2000
- Updated on 25 December 2015.

Arthur Khamidulin (sometimes spelled Artur Khamidullin or Artour Khamidouline; Russian: Артур Хамидулин; born 30 April 1977) is a Russian former ski jumper.

== Career ==
Khamidulin appeared in a top-level ski jumping competition for the first time in 1997, when he competed in the World Championships in Trondheim. He took 41st place in the normal hill (K-90) competition and 52nd place in large hill (K-120). A month after, Khamidulin debuted in the FIS Ski Jumping World Cup in a ski flying competition in Planica. After that, Khamidulin competed in nine more World Cup competitions and his best result was from Harrachov in December 1998, a 17th place. In the 1998 Winter Olympics in Nagano, Khamidulin received a 23rd and a 25th place respectively in normal hill and large hill. Khamidulin and Russia also competed in the team competition in Nagano and took 9th place. The same season he came at the 41st place in the Four Hills Tournament. Khamidulin also competed in the World Championships at Ramsau in 1999 without any eminent results. Khamidulin's weight was under 62 kg during his active ski jumping career.

=== The crash in Vikersund ===
In 2000, Khamidulin competed in the Ski-flying World Championships in Vikersund. Khamidulin jumped in the qualification round in hard wind, and after taking off, turned around to the side and crashed on his head and neck. He rolled down the long hill and lost his helmet on the way down. The competition was later stopped due to the hard winds. Khamidulin escaped with a concussion but he never jumped in a professional competition again.
