= Pavel Gaiduk =

Kazakhstani ski jumper (born 1976)

Personal information
- Nationality: Kazakhstani
- Born: 11 February 1976 (age 49); Alma-Ata, Kazakh SSR, Soviet Union

Sport
- Sport: Ski jumping

Pavel Gaiduk (born 11 February 1976) is a Kazakhstani ski jumper. He competed at the 1998 Winter Olympics and the 2002 Winter Olympics.
