= Stanislav Filimonov =

Kazakhstani ski jumper (born 1979)

Personal information
- Nationality: Kazakhstani
- Born: 7 June 1979 (age 45); Alma-Ata, Kazakh SSR, Soviet Union

Sport
- Sport: Ski jumping

Stanislav Filimonov (born 7 June 1979) is a Kazakhstani ski jumper. He competed at the 1998 Winter Olympics and the 2002 Winter Olympics.
