= Peter Žonta =

Slovenian ski jumper

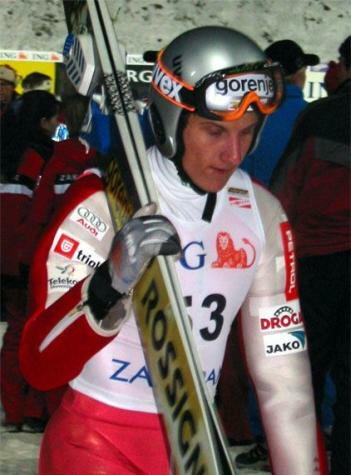
- Žonta in Zakopane, 2003

Personal information
- Born: 9 January 1979 (age 47) Ljubljana, Yugoslavia

Sport
- Sport: Ski jumping

World Cup career
- Seasons: 1996–2007
- Indiv. starts: 174
- Indiv. podiums: 2
- Indiv. wins: 1
- Team starts: 14
- Team podiums: 1
Medal record
Men's ski jumping
Representing Slovenia
Olympic Games
Bronze medal – third place	2002 Salt Lake City	Team large hill

Peter Žonta (born 9 January 1979) is a Slovenian former ski jumper who competed from 1995 to 2007. He won a bronze medal at the 2002 Winter Olympics in Salt Lake City in the team large hill event, and also won an individual large hill World Cup event in Innsbruck in 2004.
