= Valery Kobelev =

Russian ski jumper (born 1973)

Personal information
- Full name: Valery Vladimirovich Kobelev
- Born: March 4, 1973 (age 53) Kaluga, Russian SFSR, Soviet Union
- Height: 5 ft 11 in (1.80 m)

Sport
- Sport: Skiing
- Club: Russian Army Sports Club

World Cup career
- Seasons: 1995-2006
- Indiv. podiums: 0
- Indiv. wins: 0

Achievements and titles
- Personal bests: 5th place, 2002 in Sapporo.
- Updated on 18 December 2008

Valery Vladimirovich Kobelev (Russian: Валерий Владимирович Кобелев; born 4 March 1973) is a Russian ski jumper.

== Nordic combined ==
Valery Kobelev began his professional career in Nordic combined and participated in the men's team and individual events at the 1994 Winter Olympics in Lillehammer. Kobelev was placed 48th in the individual 15 km competition, and reached 12th place together with his Russian team in the team competition. He later changed his focus solely to ski jumping, and went on to participate in the 1998 Winter Olympics as a ski-jumper.

== Ski jumping career ==
Kobelev began his professional ski jumping career in 1994, and made his World Cup debut in Kuopio one year later. Since then he has started in the World Cup 46 times and in the Olympics four times. His best World Cup performance was 2002 in Sapporo where he received 5th place. Kobelev's best overall World cup season was the 2001-2002 season, when he received a 21st place. His last World Cup competition was in Willingen 2006, though he is still active and jumping in small competitions back in Russia. He is planning to end his active ski jumping career after the World Championships in Liberec, 2009.

=== 1999 crash ===
Kobelev is known, in part, for a serious crash while jumping at Planica in 1999. He lost his balance after leaving the take-off ramp, crashed head-first into the hill at 104.7 km/h and rolled at high speed down the rest of the hill unconscious. He came to a stop at the bottom of the hill and ambulance personnel rushed him 27 kilometres to a hospital in the small town of Jesenice, where he was put into an induced coma for several months. He made his return to the World Cup one year later. The crash was named the worst ski jumping crash ever by sports commentator Arne Scheie.

=== Olympic results ===
At the 1998 Winter Olympics in Nagano, Kobelev placed 54th in the normal hill competition and 35th in the large hill competition. Kobelev's Russian team reached the 9th place in the team competition. At the 2002 Winter Olympics in Salt Lake City, he placed 27th in the normal hill, and 17th in large hill.

=== World Championships results ===
Koblev competed in his first World Championship in Ramsau 1999 where he placed 26th in the large hill event (K-120) and 36th in the normal hill event (K-90). Kobelev's second World Championship was in Val di Fiemme in 2003, where he placed 33rd in the normal hill event and 39th in the large hill event.

=== Best results ===
- 9th place, Lillehammer, 1997, World Cup.
- 6th place, Villach, 2001, World Cup.
- 9th place, Predazzo, 2001, World Cup.
- 8th place, Garmisch Partenkirchen, 2002, World Cup.
- 7th place, Innsbruck, 2002, World Cup.
- 5th place, Sapporo, 2002, World Cup.

== Other ==
Kobelev's sponsor was the Russian army. He is married and speaks Russian and English. His bindings are from the label Silvretta and his boots from Adidas. During his most active period, his weight was 69 kg (152 pounds).
