= Sylvain Freiholz =

Swiss ski jumper (born 1974)

Medal record

Men's ski jumping

Representing Switzerland

World Championships
Bronze medal – third place	1997 Trondheim	Individual large hill

Sylvain Freiholz (born 23 November 1974 in Le Brassus) is a Swiss former ski jumper who competed from 1991 to 2003. He won a bronze medal in the individual large hill event at the 1997 FIS Nordic World Ski Championships in Trondheim.

Freiholz's best overall finish at the Winter Olympics was 7th in the team large hill event at Salt Lake City in 2002 and had his best individual finish of 14th in the individual large hill at Albertville in 1992. His best finish at the Ski-flying World Championships was 15th in 1994.

Freiholz's best career finish was second twice in 1992 and 1993.
