= Wojciech Skupień =

Polish ski jumper

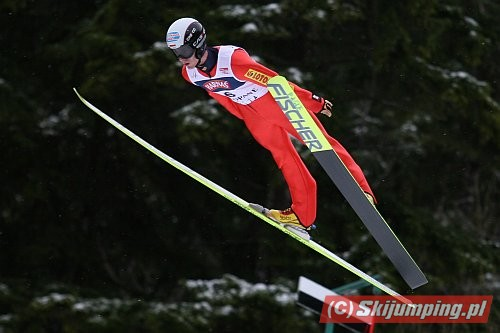

Personal information
- Born: 9 March 1976 (age 50) Zakopane, Poland

Sport
- Sport: Skiing
- Club: TS Wisła Zakopane

World Cup career
- Seasons: 1993–2008

Achievements and titles
- Personal bests: 190.5 m (625 ft); Planica, 2004
- Updated on 22 February 2014

Wojciech Skupień (born 9 March 1976) is a Polish former ski jumper who competed from 1993 to 2008. At the 1998 Winter Olympics in Nagano, he finished eighth in the team large hill and 11th in the individual large hill events.

Skupień's best finish at the FIS Nordic World Ski Championships was 15th in the normal hill event at Lahti in 2001. He finished 25th at the 2000 Ski-flying World Championships in Vikersund.

Skupień's best World Cup finish was sixth in a large hill event in the United States in 2000.
