= Robert Mateja =

Polish ski jumper

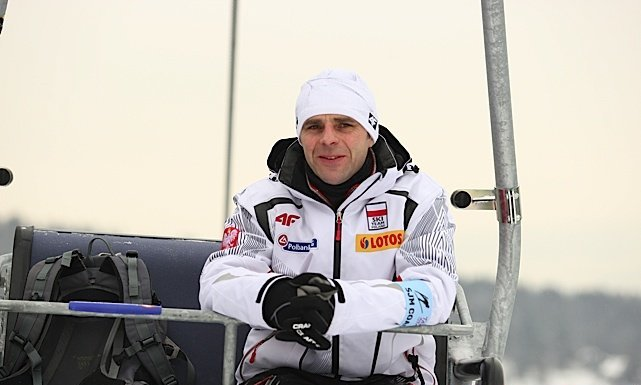

Personal information
- Full name: Robert Mateja
- Nationality: Poland
- Born: 5 October 1974 (age 52) Zakopane, Poland

Sport
- Sport: Skiing

World Cup career
- Seasons: 1992; 1995–2007
- Indiv. starts: 151
- Team podiums: 1

Achievements and titles
- Personal bests: 205.5 m (674 ft); Planica, Mar 2007
- Updated on 13 December 2016

Robert Mateja (born 5 October 1974) is a Polish former ski jumper who competed from 1992 to 2008. His best individual World Cup finishes were fifth in Harrachov (large hill) on 14 December 1996, and fifth again in Sapporo on 28 January 2001. His best team finish was third in Villach on 9 December 2001.

In the FIS Nordic World Ski Championships, Mateja's best finishes were fifth in the large hill individual event in Trondheim (1997) and fifth again in the large hill team event in Sapporo (2007). His best finishes at the Winter Olympics were fifth in the large hill team event (2006) and 20th in the large hill individual event (1998). In the Ski Flying World Championships he finished eighth in the 2004 team event and 19th in the 2006 individual event. At Continental Cup level he scored three individual victories in 2003, 2004 and 2007.

He has been a Polish champion five times - last time, after Winter Olympics 2006 when he unexpectedly beat Adam Małysz. Mateja retired from competitive sport in 2008 to work as an assistant coach of Polish national ski jumping team.
