= Michal Doležal (ski jumper) =

Czech athlete and ski jumper (born 1978)

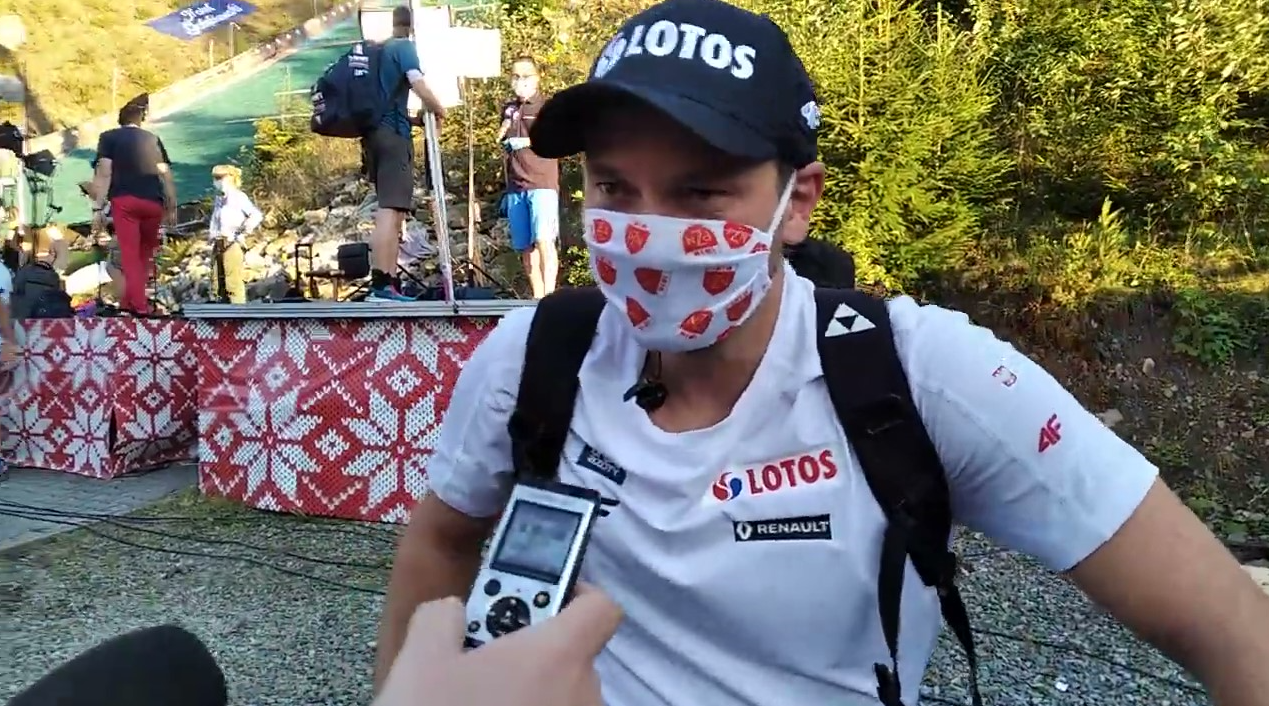
Michal Doležal in 2020

Michal Doležal (born 11 March 1978 in Jablonec nad Nisou) is a Czech former ski jumper who competed from 1996 to 2007. At the 1998 Winter Olympics in Nagano, he finished seventh in the team large hill and eighth in the individual large hill competitions. He is ex-Manager of the Polish Ski-Flying team, currently works in German team with Horngacher.

Doležal's best finish at the Ski Jumping World Championships was 31st twice (normal hill in 1999 and large hill in 2011). He also finished 32nd at the 2000 Ski Flying World Championships in Vikersund.

Doležal's best individual World Cup finish was seventh in a large hill competition in Poland in 1999. His career best finish was third in an FIS Cup normal hill competition in the Czech Republic in 2006.
