= 2001–02 FIS Ski Jumping Continental Cup =

Ski-jumping competition series

FIS Continental Cup 2001/02
Winners
- Overall: (Germany) Michael Neumayer

Competitions
- Venues: 25
- Individual: 45
- Team: 2
- Cancelled: 9 Individual + 1 Team

The 2001/02 FIS Ski Jumping Continental Cup was the 11th in a row (9th official) Continental Cup winter season in ski jumping for men. Europa Cup was a predecessor of Continental Cup.

Other competitive circuits this season included the World Cup and Grand Prix.

== Men's Individual ==
Individual events in the CC history

Total	F	L	N	Winners
438	2	162	274	189

after normal hill event in Vikersund (16 March 2002)

=== Calendar ===
All	No.	Date	Place (Hill)	Size	Winner	Second	Third
394	1	6 July 2001	(Slovenia) Velenje (Grajski grič K85)	N _{249}	(Slovenia) Jure Radelj	(Slovenia) Igor Medved	(Slovenia) Robert Kranjec
395	2	7 July 2001	(Slovenia) Velenje (Grajski grič K85)	N _{250}	(Slovenia) Robert Kranjec	(Slovenia) Jure Radelj	(Slovenia) Primož Urh-Zupan
396	3	14 July 2001	(Austria) Villach (Villacher Alpenarena K90)	N _{251}	(Slovenia) Robert Kranjec	(Germany) Roland Audenrieth	(Austria) Stefan Kaiser
397	4	15 July 2001	(Austria) Villach (Villacher Alpenarena K90)	N _{252}	(Slovenia) Robert Kranjec	(Czech Republic) Jakub Hlava	(Austria) Stefan Kaiser
398	5	4 August 2001	(Germany) Oberstdorf (Schattenbergschanze K90)	N _{253}	(Germany) Georg Späth	(South Korea) Choi Heung-chul	(Poland) Wojciech Skupień
399	6	18 August 2001	(Norway) Rælingen (Marikollen K88)	N _{254}	(Germany) Stephan Hocke	(Finland) Janne Happonen	(Germany) Michael Neumayer
400	7	19 August 2001	(Norway) Rælingen (Marikollen K88)	N _{255}	(Germany) Kai Bracht	(Finland) Janne Happonen	(Norway) Frode Håre
401	8	25 August 2001	(Canada) Calgary (Alberta Ski Jump K89)	N _{256}	(United States) Alan Alborn	(Slovenia) Primož Peterka	(Finland) Janne Ylijärvi
402	9	26 August 2001	(Canada) Calgary (Alberta Ski Jump K89)	N _{257}	(United States) Alan Alborn	(Austria) Martin Koch	(Finland) Janne Ylijärvi
403	10	1 September 2001	(United States) Park City (Utah Olympic Park K120)	L _{144}	(United States) Alan Alborn	(Austria) Martin Koch	(Slovenia) Robert Kranjec
404	11	1 September 2001	(United States) Park City (Utah Olympic Park K120)	L _{145}	(Finland) Kimmo Yliriesto	(Slovenia) Robert Kranjec	(Finland) Janne Ylijärvi
405	12	29 September 2001	(Germany) Oberhof (Hans-Renner-Schanze K120)	L _{146}	(Russia) Ildar Fatchullin	(United States) Alan Alborn	(Germany) Stephan Hocke
		30 September 2001	(Germany) Oberhof (Hans-Renner-Schanze K120)	L _{cnx}	cancelled		
406	13	17 November 2001	(Finland) Kuusamo (Rukatunturi K120)	L _{147}	(Finland) Janne Ylijärvi	(United States) Alan Alborn	(Finland) Lassi Huuskonen
407	14	18 November 2001	(Finland) Kuusamo (Rukatunturi K120)	L _{148}	(Finland) Janne Ylijärvi	(Norway) Kristian Brenden	(Finland) Akseli Kokkonen
		1 December 2001	(Sweden) Falun (Lugnet K115) (Note: Not clear if it was planned to jump on normal (K90) or large hill (K115) in Falun.)	L _{cnx}	cancelled		
		2 December 2001	(Sweden) Falun (Lugnet K115)	L _{cnx}	cancelled		
408	15	15 December 2001	(Finland) Lahti (Salpausselkä K116)	L _{149}	(Finland) Janne Ylijärvi	(Finland) Kimmo Yliriesto	(Finland) Janne Happonen
409	16	16 December 2001	(Finland) Lahti (Salpausselkä K116)	L _{150}	(Finland) Janne Ylijärvi	(Finland) Pekka Salminen	(Finland) Kimmo Yliriesto
410	17	26 December 2001	(Switzerland) St. Moritz (Olympiaschanze K95) (Note: Not clear if Olympiaschanze hill in St. Moritz had K-point at K90 or K95 at that time.)	N _{258}	(Japan) Teppei Takano	(Japan) Hiroki Yamada	(Slovenia) Blaž Vrhovnik
411	18	28 December 2001	(Switzerland) Engelberg (Gross-Titlis-Schanze K120)	L _{151}	(Norway) Morten Solem	(Austria) Stefan Thurnbichler	(Japan) Teppei Takano
412	19	2 January 2002	(Austria) Innsbruck (Bergiselschanze K120)	L _{152}	(United States) Clint Jones	(Germany) Dirk Else	(Germany) Michael Neumayer
413	20	11 January 2002	(Japan) Sapporo (Miyanomori K90) (Ōkurayama K120)	N _{259}	(Japan) Akira Higashi	(Japan) Yūta Watase	(Japan) Daiki Itō
414	21	12 January 2002	(Japan) Sapporo (Miyanomori K90) (Ōkurayama K120)	L _{153}	(Finland) Janne Happonen	(Japan) Akira Higashi	(Japan) Masahiko Harada
415	22	12 January 2002	(Austria) Bischofshofen (Paul-Ausserleitner-Schanze K120)	L _{154}	(Germany) Michael Neumayer	(Germany) Kai Bracht	(Finland) Kalle Keituri
416	23	13 January 2002	(Japan) Sapporo (Ōkurayama K120)	L _{155}	(Finland) Janne Happonen	(Japan) Takanobu Okabe	(Japan) Masahiko Harada
417	24	13 January 2002	(Austria) Bischofshofen (Paul-Ausserleitner-Schanze K120)	L _{156}	(Finland) Pekka Salminen	(Germany) Michael Neumayer	(Austria) Wolfgang Loitzl
418	25	19 January 2002	(France) Courchevel (Tremplin du Praz K120)	L _{157}	(Germany) Jörg Ritzerfeld	(Germany) Michael Neumayer	(Norway) Daniel Forfang
419	26	19 January 2002	(United States) Ishpeming (Suicide Hill K90) (Note: Not clear if Suicide Hill in Ishpeming had K-point at K85 or K90 at that time.)	N _{260}	(Austria) Mathias Hafele	(Austria) Gerhard Hofer	(Austria) Bastian Kaltenböck
420	27	20 January 2002	(France) Courchevel (Tremplin du Praz K120)	L _{158}	(France) Nicolas Dessum	(Germany) Michael Neumayer	(Germany) Jörg Ritzerfeld
421	28	20 January 2002	(United States) Ishpeming (Suicide Hill K90)	N _{261}	(Slovenia) Bine Norčič	(Norway) Tore Sneli	(Austria) Gerhard Hofer
422	29	26 January 2002	(Germany) Lauscha (Marktiegelschanze K92)	N _{262}	(Germany) Hansjörg Jäkle	(Germany) Michael Möllinger	(Germany) Frank Ludwig
423	30	26 January 2002	(United States) Westby (Snowflake K106) (Note: Not clear if Snowflake hill in Westby had K-point at K106 or K113 at that time.)	L _{159}	(United States) Thomas Schwall	(Slovenia) Uroš Peterka	(Austria) Bastian Kaltenböck
		27 January 2002	(Germany) Lauscha (Marktiegelschanze K92)	N _{cnx}	cancelled		
424	31	27 January 2002	(United States) Westby (Snowflake K106)	L _{160}	(Germany) Hans Petrat	(United States) Thomas Schwall	(Slovenia) Bine Norčič
425	32	2 February 2002	(Germany) Braunlage (Wurmbergschanze K90)	N _{263}	(Germany) Jörg Ritzerfeld	(Austria) Manuel Fettner	(Germany) Michael Neumayer
426	33	3 February 2002	(Germany) Braunlage (Wurmbergschanze K90)	N _{264}	(Germany) Jörg Ritzerfeld	(Finland) Lauri Hakola	(Czech Republic) Jakub Jiroutek
427	34	9 February 2002	(Italy) Gallio (Trampolino di Pakstall K92) (Note: Not clear if Trampolino di Pakstall hill in Gallio had K-point at K90 or K92 at that time.)	N _{265}	(Germany) Jörg Ritzerfeld	(Norway) Morten Solem	(Germany) Frank Löffler
428	35	10 February 2002	(Italy) Gallio (Trampolino di Pakstall K92)	N _{266}	(Austria) Manuel Fettner	(Germany) Michael Möllinger	(Slovenia) Uroš Peterka
2002 Winter Olympics (10 – 13 February • (United States) Salt Lake City)
429	36	16 February 2002	(Slovenia) Planica (Srednja Bloudkova K90)	N _{267}	(Slovenia) Bine Norčič	(Germany) Jörg Ritzerfeld	(Austria) Manuel Fettner
		23 February 2002	(Germany) Brotterode (Inselbergschanze K98)	N _{cnx}	cancelled		
		24 February 2002	(Germany) Brotterode (Inselbergschanze K98)	N _{cnx}	cancelled		
430	37	23 February 2002	(United States) Iron Mountain (Pine Mountain Ski Jump K120)	L _{161}			
431	38	24 February 2002	(United States) Iron Mountain (Pine Mountain Ski Jump K120)	L _{162}	(Finland) Arttu Lappi	(Austria) Stefan Thurnbichler	(Germany) Ferdinand Bader
432	39	2 March 2002	(Germany) Schönwald (Adlerschanzen Schönwald K85) (Note: Not clear if Adlerschanzen Schönwald hill in Schönwald had K-point at K82, K84 or K85 at that time.)	N _{268}	(Germany) Hansjörg Jäkle	(Austria) Manuel Fettner	(Germany) Frank Löffler
433	40	3 March 2002	(Germany) Schönwald (Adlerschanzen Schönwald K85)	N _{269}	(South Korea) Choi Heung-chul	(Germany) Hansjörg Jäkle	(Austria) Manuel Fettner
30th Schwarzwald Tournament Overall (2 – 3 March 2002)					(Germany) Hansjörg Jäkle	(Austria) Manuel Fettner	(South Korea) Choi Heung-chul
FIS Ski Flying World Championships 2002 (9 March • (Czech Republic) Harrachov)
		10 March 2002	(Poland) Zakopane (Wielka Krokiew K120)	L _{cnx}	cancelled		
434	41	13 March 2002	(Japan) Zaō (Yamagata K90)	N _{270}	(Austria) Balthasar Schneider	(Japan) Daijirō Higuchi	(Japan) Homare Kishimoto
435	42	14 March 2002	(Japan) Zaō (Yamagata K90)	N _{271}	(Slovenia) Jernej Damjan	(Japan) Homare Kishimoto	(Austria) Balthasar Schneider
436	43	14 March 2002	(Norway) Vikersund (Vikersundbakken K90)	N _{272}	(Germany) Maximilian Mechler	(Finland) Toni Nieminen	(Germany) Stefan Pieper
437	44	15 March 2002	(Norway) Vikersund (Vikersundbakken K90)	N _{273}	(Germany) Frank Ludwig	(Germany) Dirk Else	(Germany) Michael Neumayer
438	45	16 March 2002	(Norway) Vikersund (Vikersundbakken K90)	N _{274}	(Germany) Michael Neumayer	(Germany) Maximilian Mechler	(Finland) Toni Nieminen
		23 March 2002	(Germany) Ruhpolding (Große Zirmbergschanze K120)	L _{cnx}	cancelled		
		24 March 2002	(Germany) Ruhpolding (Große Zirmbergschanze K120)	L _{cnx}	cancelled		
11th FIS Continental Cup Overall (6 July 2001 – 15 March 2002)					(Germany) Michael Neumayer	(Finland) Janne Ylijärvi	(Germany) Jörg Ritzerfeld

==== Overall ====
Rank	after 45 events	Points
1	(Germany) Michael Neumayer	1225
2	(Finland) Janne Ylijärvi	816
3	(Germany) Jörg Ritzerfeld	759
4	(Germany) Kai Bracht	660
5	(Finland) Kimmo Yliriesto	606
6	(Slovenia) Robert Kranjec	580
7	(Finland) Janne Happonen	572
8	(Austria) Manuel Fettner	533
9	(United States) Alan Alborn	532
10	(Germany) Roland Audenrieth	510

== Team events ==
Team events in the CC history

Total	L	N	Winners	Competition
5	2	3	3	Men's team

after men's NH team event in Planica (16 February 2002)

=== Calendar ===
All	No.	Date	Place (Hill)	Size	Winner	Second	Third
Men's team
4	1	5 August 2001	(Germany) Oberstdorf (Schattenbergschanze K90)	N _{002}	Germany Roland Audenrieth; Stephan Hocke; Jörg Ritzerfeld; Georg Späth	South Korea Choi Yong-jik; Kang Chil-ku; Kim Hyun-ki; Choi Heung-chul	Switzerland Andreas Küttel; Marco Steinauer; Sylvain Freiholz; Simon Ammann
5	1	16 February 2002	(Slovenia) Planica (Srednja Bloudkova K90)	N _{003}	Slovenia Rok Benkovič; Primož Urh-Zupan; Blaž Vrhovnik; Bine Norčič	Germany Michael Neumayer; Dirk Else; Frank Löffler; Jörg Ritzerfeld	Finland Janne Ylijärvi; Pekka Salminen; Kimmo Yliriesto; Tami Kiuru
		9 March 2002	(Poland) Zakopane (Wielka Krokiew K120)	L _{cnx}	cancelled		

== Europa Cup vs. Continental Cup ==
- Last two Europa Cup seasons (1991/92 and 1992/93) are recognized as first two Continental Cup seasons by International Ski Federation (FIS), although Continental Cup under this name officially started first season in 1993/94 season.

== See also ==
- 2001–02 FIS World Cup
- 2001 FIS Grand Prix
