= 2000–01 FIS Ski Flying World Cup =

Ski Flying World Cup 2000/01
Winners
- Overall: (Germany) Martin Schmitt
- Nations Cup (unofficial): Finland

Competitions
- Venues: 3
- Individual: 5
- Team: 1

The 2000/01 FIS Ski Flying World Cup was the 11th official World Cup season in ski flying awarded with small crystal globe as the subdiscipline of FIS Ski Jumping World Cup.

== Map of World Cup hosts ==
(Czech Republic) Harrachov	(Germany) Oberstdorf	(Slovenia) Planica
Čerťák	Heini-Klopfer-Skiflugschanze	Velikanka bratov Gorišek
Europe

== Calendar ==
=== Men's Individual ===
All	No.	Date	Place (Hill)	Size	Winner	Second	Third	Ski flying leader	R.
496	1	13 January 2001	(Czech Republic) Harrachov (Čerťák K185)	F _{047}	(Poland) Adam Małysz	(Germany) Martin Schmitt	(Finland) Risto Jussilainen	(Poland) Adam Małysz	
497	2	14 January 2001	(Czech Republic) Harrachov (Čerťák K185)	F _{048}	(Poland) Adam Małysz	(Finland) Janne Ahonen	(Germany) Martin Schmitt	(Poland) Adam Małysz	
504	3	3 March 2001	(Germany) Oberstdorf (Heini-Klopfer K185)	F _{049}	(Finland) Risto Jussilainen	(Finland) Veli-Matti Lindström	(Finland) Matti Hautamäki	(Poland) Adam Małysz	
505	4	4 March 2001	(Germany) Oberstdorf (Heini-Klopfer K185)	F _{050}	(Germany) Martin Schmitt	(Poland) Adam Małysz	(Finland) Risto Jussilainen	(Poland) Adam Małysz	
509	5	18 March 2001	(Slovenia) Planica (Velikanka b. Gorišek K185)	F _{051}	(Germany) Martin Schmitt	(Finland) Risto Jussilainen	(Norway) Tommy Ingebrigtsen	(Germany) Martin Schmitt	
11th FIS Ski Flying Men's Overall (13 January – 18 March 2001)					(Germany) Martin Schmitt	(Poland) Adam Małysz	(Finland) Risto Jussilainen	Ski Flying Overall	

=== Men's team ===
All	No.	Date	Place (Hill)	Size	Winner	Second	Third	R.
20	1	17 March 2001	(Slovenia) Planica (Velikanka bratov Gorišek K185)	F _{002}	Finland Jussi Hautamäki; Risto Jussilainen; Tami Kiuru; Veli-Matti Lindström	Austria Wolfgang Loitzl; Andreas Goldberger; Martin Koch; Stefan Horngacher	Japan Hideharu Miyahira; Kazuya Yoshioka; Masahiko Harada; Noriaki Kasai	

== Standings ==
=== Ski Flying ===
Rank	after 5 events	13/01/2001 Harrachov	14/01/2001 Harrachov	03/03/2001 Oberstdorf	04/03/2001 Oberstdorf	18/03/2001 Planica	Total
	(Germany) Martin Schmitt	80	60	45	100	100	385
2	(Poland) Adam Małysz	100	100	50	80	50	380
3	(Finland) Risto Jussilainen	60	45	100	60	80	345
4	(Finland) Matti Hautamäki	40	36	60	50	—	186
5	(Norway) Tommy Ingebrigtsen	32	50	15	12	60	169
6	(Finland) Janne Ahonen	45	80	26	—	—	151
7	(Austria) Andreas Goldberger	14	13	29	45	36	137
8	(Japan) Noriaki Kasai	36	24	13	40	13	126
9	(Germany) Sven Hannawald	50	40	20	6	—	116
10	(Finland) Veli-Matti Lindström	—	—	80	32	—	112
11	(Austria) Martin Höllwarth	26	32	36	9	—	103
12	(Austria) Stefan Horngacher	—	—	40	36	26	102
13	(Finland) Tami Kiuru	—	—	14	29	45	88
14	(Finland) Jani Soininen	22	20	24	10	—	76
15	(Germany) Frank Löffler	18	12	12	18	12	72
16	(Poland) Robert Mateja	29	29	—	—	11	69
17	(Norway) Olav Magne Dønnem	24	18	—	—	24	66
18	(Germany) Christof Duffner	—	—	18	15	29	62
19	(Austria) Wolfgang Loitzl	—	—	22	22	16	60
20	(Slovenia) Igor Medved	—	—	—	11	40	51
21	(Norway) Henning Stensrud	15	16	—	—	18	49
	(Japan) Hideharu Miyahira	—	—	1	26	22	49
23	(Italy) Roberto Cecon	16	22	4	—	6	48
24	(Norway) Roar Ljøkelsøy	20	26	—	—	—	46
25	(Finland) Jussi Hautamäki	—	—	16	14	15	45
26	(Japan) Kazuhiro Nakamura	12	7	3	16	5	43
27	(United States) Alan Alborn	—	—	10	24	8	42
28	(Austria) Andreas Widhölzl	—	—	32	—	—	32
	(Austria) Martin Koch	—	—	—	—	32	32
30	(Germany) Michael Uhrmann	7	14	—	8	1	30
31	(Slovenia) Jure Radelj	10	9	8	—	—	27
	(Germany) Georg Späth	—	—	7	20	—	27
33	(France) Nicolas Dessum	1	3	—	7	15	26
34	(Czech Republic) Jakub Janda	—	—	2	3	20	25
35	(Norway) Kristian Brenden	11	10	—	—	—	21
	(Japan) Kazuya Yoshioka	—	15	6	—	—	21
37	(Finland) Toni Nieminen	14	6	—	—	—	20
38	(Switzerland) Marco Steinauer	—	—	9	—	10	19
39	(Austria) Reinhard Schwarzenberger	—	—	5	13	—	18
40	(Japan) Kazuyoshi Funaki	6	11	—	—	—	17
41	(Poland) Wojciech Skupień	9	4	—	—	3	16
	(Finland) Ville Kantee	—	—	11	5	—	16
43	(Germany) Alexander Herr	—	2	—	4	9	15
44	(Czech Republic) Jakub Hlava	5	8	—	—	—	13
45	(Czech Republic) Jaroslav Sakala	8	1	—	—	—	9
	(Germany) Roland Audenrieth	4	5	—	—	—	9
47	(Germany) Hansjörg Jäkle	—	—	—	—	7	7
48	(Norway) Anders Bardal	—	—	—	2	4	6
49	(Poland) Łukasz Kruczek	3	—	—	—	—	3
50	(Norway) Håvard Lie	2	—	—	—	—	2
	(Japan) Masahiko Harada	—	—	—	—	2	2
52	(Japan) Yuta Watase	—	—	—	1	—	1

=== Nations Cup (unofficial) ===
Rank	after 6 events	Points
1	Finland	1439
2	Germany	873
3	Austria	834
4	Poland	668
5	Norway	609
6	Japan	559
7	Czech Republic	147
8	Slovenia	138
9	Italy	48
10	United States	42
11	France	26
12	Switzerland	19
