= 1998–99 FIS Ski Jumping Continental Cup =

Ski-jumping competition series

FIS Continental Cup 1998/99
Winners
- Overall: (Germany) Roland Audenrieth

Competitions
- Venues: 31
- Individual: 51

The 1998/99 FIS Ski Jumping Continental Cup was the 8th in a row (6th official) Continental Cup winter season in ski jumping for men. Europa Cup was a predecessor of Continental Cup.

Other competitive circuits this season included the World Cup and Grand Prix.

== Men's Individual ==
Individual events in the CC history

Total	F	L	N	Winners
302	2	108	192	144

after large hill event in Kuusamo (28 March 1999)

=== Calendar ===
All	No.	Date	Place (Hill)	Size	Winner	Second	Third	R.
252	1	27 June 1998	(Slovenia) Velenje (Grajski grič K75) (Note: Not clear if Grajski grič hill in Velenje had K-point at K75 or K85 at that time.)	N _{161}	(Slovenia) Primož Peterka			
253	2	28 June 1998	(Slovenia) Velenje (Grajski grič K75)	N _{162}	(Slovenia) Primož Peterka			
254	3	25 July 1998	(Germany) Berchtesgaden (Kälbersteinschanze K90)	N _{163}	(Germany) Sven Hannawald	(Germany) Alexander Herr	(Germany) Ronny Hornschuh	
255	4	26 July 1998	(Austria) Villach (Villacher Alpenarena K90)	N _{164}	(Switzerland) Marco Steinauer	(Germany) Alexander Herr	(Austria) Matthias Wallner	
256	5	1 August 1998	(Germany) Oberstdorf (Schattenbergschanze K90)	N _{165}	(Switzerland) Sylvain Freiholz	(Germany) Olaf Hegenbarth	(Austria) Roland Wakolm	
257	6	2 August 1998	(Germany) Oberstdorf (Schattenbergschanze K90)	N _{166}	(Germany) Martin Schmitt	(Germany) Sven Hannawald	(Czech Republic) František Jež	
258	7	15 August 1998	(Poland) Zakopane (Średnia Krokiew K85)	N _{167}	(Austria) Falko Krismayr	(Czech Republic) Jakub Janda (Slovenia) Jaka Grosar		
259	8	16 August 1998	(Poland) Zakopane (Średnia Krokiew K85)	N _{168}	(Poland) Robert Mateja	(Austria) Roland Schraml (Austria) Gerhard Gattinger		
260	9	20 August 1998	(Norway) Rælingen (Marikollen K88)	N _{169}	(Norway) Roar Ljøkelsøy	(Norway) Arne Sneli	(Norway) Kristian Brenden (Norway) Egil Grønn	
261	10	17 December 1998	(Finland) Kuopio (Puijo K120)	L _{090}	(Finland) Toni Nieminen	(Finland) Risto Jussilainen	(Finland) Veli-Matti Lindström	
262	11	19 December 1998	(Finland) Lahti (Salpausselkä K116)	L _{091}	(Norway) Wilhelm Brenna	(Finland) Janne Väätäinen	(Finland) Veli-Matti Lindström	
263	12	20 December 1998	(Finland) Lahti (Salpausselkä K116)	L _{092}	(Finland) Janne Väätäinen	(Finland) Veli-Matti Lindström	(Norway) Marius Småriset	
264	13	26 December 1998	(Switzerland) St. Moritz (Olympiaschanze K95)	N _{170}	(Switzerland) Sylvain Freiholz	(Norway) Marius Småriset	(Switzerland) Marco Steinauer	
265	14	3 January 1999	(Switzerland) Engelberg (Gross-Titlis-Schanze K120)	L _{093}	(Slovenia) Primož Urh-Zupan	(Norway) Bjørn Einar Romøren	(Slovenia) Jure Radelj	
266	15	9 January 1999	(Austria) Bad Goisern (Kalmberg-Schanze K90)	N _{171}	(Austria) Fabian Ebenhoch	(Austria) Martin Koch	(Slovenia) Rolando Kaligaro	
267	16	10 January 1999	(Austria) Bad Goisern (Kalmberg-Schanze K90)	N _{172}	(Slovenia) Primož Urh-Zupan	(Norway) Marius Småriset (Austria) Martin Koch		
268	17	15 January 1999	(Japan) Sapporo (Miyanomori K90) (Ōkurayama K120)	N _{173}	(Japan) Jin'ya Nishikata	(Japan) Kazuki Nishishita (Japan) Yukitaka Fukita		
269	18	16 January 1999	(Japan) Sapporo (Miyanomori K90) (Ōkurayama K120)	L _{094}	(Japan) Jin'ya Nishikata	(Japan) Kazuki Nishishita	(Norway) Kjell Erik Sagbakken	
270	19	16 January 1999	(Germany) Lauscha (Marktiegelschanze K92)	N _{174}	(Norway) Tom Aage Aarnes	(United States) Alan Alborn (Germany) Roland Audenrieth		
271	20	17 January 1999	(Japan) Sapporo (Ōkurayama K120)	L _{095}	(Japan) Yasuhiko Ōta	(Japan) Yutaka Katayama	(Norway) Kjell Erik Sagbakken	
272	21	17 January 1999	(Germany) Lauscha (Marktiegelschanze K92)	N _{175}	(Germany) Roland Audenrieth	(Slovenia) Bine Norčič	(Norway) Aril Carlson	
273	22	23 January 1999	(Italy) Gallio (Trampolino di Pakstall K95) (Note: Not clear if Trampolino di Pakstall hill in Gallio had K-point at K92 or K95 at that time.)	N _{176}	(Slovenia) Miha Rihtar	(Italy) Roberto Cecon	(United States) Alan Alborn	
274	23	24 January 1999	(Italy) Gallio (Trampolino di Pakstall K95)	N _{177}	(Finland) Ville Kantee	(Norway) Marius Småriset	(Germany) Georg Späth (Switzerland) Marco Steinauer	
275	24	29 January 1999	(Germany) Reit im Winkl (Franz-Haslberger-Schanze K90)	N _{178}	(Finland) Pekka Salminen	(Finland) Veli-Matti Lindström	(Austria) Wilfried Eberharter	
276	25	30 January 1999	(Austria) Saalfelden (Bibergschanze K85)	N _{179}	(Austria) Stefan Kaiser	(Austria) Florian Liegl	(Slovenia) Gašper Čavlovič	
277	26	31 January 1999	(Germany) Ruhpolding (Große Zirmbergschanze K108)	L _{096}	(Germany) Roland Audenrieth	(Finland) Veli-Matti Lindström	(Slovenia) Gašper Čavlovič	
German Austrian Three Hills Tournament Overall (29 – 31 January 1999)					(Germany) Roland Audenrieth	(United States) Brendan Doran	(Slovenia) Gašper Čavlovič	
278	27	6 February 1999	(Germany) Braunlage (Wurmbergschanze K80)	N _{180}	(Norway) Aril Carlson	(Austria) Roland Wakolm (Austria) Martin Zimmermann		
279	28	7 February 1999	(Germany) Braunlage (Wurmbergschanze K80)	N _{181}	(Austria) Falko Krismayr	(Norway) Marius Småriset	(Slovenia) Robert Kranjec	
280	29	20 February 1999	(Slovenia) Planica (Bloudkova velikanka K120)	L _{097}	(Norway) Wilhelm Brenna	(Norway) Tore Sneli	(Austria) Wilfried Eberharter	
281	30	20 February 1999	(United States) Westby (Snowflake K106)	L _{098}	(Austria) Bernhard Metzler	(Germany) Leif Frey	(Slovenia) Urban Franc	
282	31	21 February 1999	(Slovenia) Planica (Bloudkova velikanka K120)	L _{099}	(Norway) Wilhelm Brenna	(Norway) Tore Sneli	(Austria) Martin Koch	
283	32	21 February 1999	(United States) Westby (Snowflake K106)	L _{100}	(Japan) Yūsuke Kaneko	(Austria) Fabian Ebenhoch	(Slovenia) Urban Franc	
284	33	27 February 1999	(Germany) Titisee-Neustadt (Hochfirstschanze K113)	L _{101}	(Austria) Matthias Wallner	(Finland) Matti Hautamäki	(Norway) Olav Magne Dønnem	
285	34	27 February 1999	(United States) Iron Mountain (Pine Mountain Ski Jump K120)	L _{102}	(Japan) Yūsuke Kaneko	(Germany) Roland Audenrieth	(United States) Rhys Hecox	
286	35	28 February 1999	(Germany) Schönwald (Adlerschanzen Schönwald K85) (Note: Not clear if Adlerschanzen Schönwald hill in Schönwald had K-point at K83 or K85 at that time.)	N _{182}	(Germany) Gerd Siegmund	(South Korea) Choi Yong-jik	(Germany) Michael Uhrmann	
27th Schwarzwald Tournament Overall (27 and 28 February 1999)					(Finland) Matti Hautamäki	(Austria) Martin Koch	(Germany) Gerd Siegmund	
287	36	5 March 1999	(United States) Ishpeming (Suicide Hill K90)	N _{183}	(Japan) Yukitaka Fukita	(Germany) Roland Audenrieth	(Austria) Fabian Ebenhoch	
288	37	6 March 1999	(United States) Ishpeming (Suicide Hill K90)	N _{184}	(Germany) Roland Audenrieth	(Finland) Jani Salo	(Austria) Bernhard Metzler	
289	38	7 March 1999	(Japan) Sapporo (Ōkurayama K120)	L _{103}	(Japan) Katsutoshi Chiba	(Japan) Jin'ya Nishikata	(Japan) Kenji Suda	
290	39	7 March 1999	(United States) Ishpeming (Suicide Hill K90)	N _{185}	(Austria) Fabian Ebenhoch	(Germany) Roland Audenrieth	(Austria) Bernhard Metzler	
291	40	10 March 1999	(Japan) Zaō (Yamagata K90)	N _{186}	(Japan) Kazuki Nishishita	(Japan) Yūsuke Kaneko	(Japan) Jin'ya Nishikata	
292	41	10 March 1999	(France) Courchevel (Tremplin du Praz K120)	L _{104}	(Norway) Tore Sneli	(Poland) Wojciech Skupień	(Slovenia) Miha Rihtar	
293	42	11 March 1999	(Japan) Zaō (Yamagata K90)	N _{187}	(Japan) Kazuki Nishishita	(Japan) Katsutoshi Chiba	(Austria) Thomas Hörl	
294	43	11 March 1999	(France) Courchevel (Tremplin du Praz K120)	L _{105}	(Norway) Olav Magne Dønnem	(France) Rémi Santiago	(Italy) Ivan Lunardi	
295	44	12 March 1999	(Norway) Vikersund (Vikersundbakken K90)	N _{188}	(Norway) Wilhelm Brenna (Norway) Kjell Erik Sagbakken		(United States) Rhys Hecox	
296	45	13 March 1999	(Norway) Vikersund (Vikersundbakken K90)	N _{189}	(Norway) Wilhelm Brenna	(Norway) Espen Bredesen	(Norway) Sturle Holseter	
297	46	20 March 1999	(Sweden) Hede (Hedebacken K90)	N _{190}	(Finland) Toni Nieminen	(Germany) Dirk Else	(Finland) Akseli Lajunen	
298	47	21 March 1999	(Sweden) Hede (Hedebacken K90)	N _{191}	(Norway) Tom Aage Aarnes	(Finland) Akseli Lajunen	(Japan) Yoshiharu Ikeda	
299	48	24 March 1999	(Finland) Kuopio (Puijo K120)	L _{106}	(United States) Rhys Hecox	(Norway) Olav Magne Dønnem	(Finland) Jussi Hautamäki	
300	49	26 March 1999	(Finland) Rovaniemi (Ounasvaara K90)	N _{192}	(Finland) Jussi Hautamäki	(Finland) Pekka Salminen	(Japan) Yoshiharu Ikeda	
301	50	27 March 1999	(Finland) Kuusamo (Rukatunturi K120)	L _{107}	(Finland) Jussi Hautamäki	(Finland) Juha-Matti Ruuskanen	(Finland) Tami Kiuru	
302	51	28 March 1999	(Finland) Kuusamo (Rukatunturi K120)	L _{108}	(Finland) Tami Kiuru	(Germany) Roland Audenrieth	(Germany) Michael Uhrmann	
8th FIS Continental Cup Overall (27 June 1998 – 28 March 1999)					(Germany) Roland Audenrieth	(Norway) Marius Småriset	(Norway) Wilhelm Brenna	

== Standings ==
=== Overall ===
Rank	after 51 events	Points
1	(Germany) Roland Audenrieth	1208
2	(Norway) Marius Småriset	833
3	(Norway) Wilhelm Brenna	824
4	(Austria) Fabian Ebenhoch	736
5	(Austria) Martin Koch	728
6	(Germany) Michael Uhrmann	658
7	(Germany) Dirk Else	571
8	(Norway) Tom Aage Aarnes	525
9	(Austria) Falko Krismayr	516
10	(Slovenia) Robert Kranjec	514

== Europa Cup vs. Continental Cup ==
- Last two Europa Cup seasons (1991/92 and 1992/93) are recognized as first two Continental Cup seasons by International Ski Federation (FIS), although Continental Cup under this name officially started first season in 1993/94 season.

== See also ==
- 1998–99 FIS World Cup
- 1998 FIS Grand Prix
