= 1999–2000 FIS Ski Jumping World Cup – Zakopane =

Location in Europe

1999–2000 FIS Ski Jumping World Cup – Zakopane was a series of ski jumping competitions held as part of the 1999–2000 FIS Ski Jumping World Cup from 17 to 19 December 1999 at the Wielka Krokiew in Zakopane, Poland.

Two individual competitions were contested on the large hill, marking the sixth time Zakopane hosted World Cup ski jumping events. These were the sixth and seventh competitions of the 1999–2000 World Cup season.

Both events were won by German skier Martin Schmitt. Janne Ahonen of Finland finished second in both competitions. The third-place finishers were Lasse Ottesen of Norway in the first event and Andreas Widhölzl of Austria in the second.

This was the fourth time Zakopane hosted two individual large hill competitions in a single World Cup event, following 1996, 1998, and January 1999. In 1980, one competition was held on the normal hill and one on the large hill, while in 1990, a single large hill competition took place.

A total of 86 athletes from 17 nations participated, with the oldest competitor being Norway's Espen Bredesen (31 years, 318 days) and the youngest being Poland's Tomisław Tajner (16 years, 217 days).

== Pre-competition ==
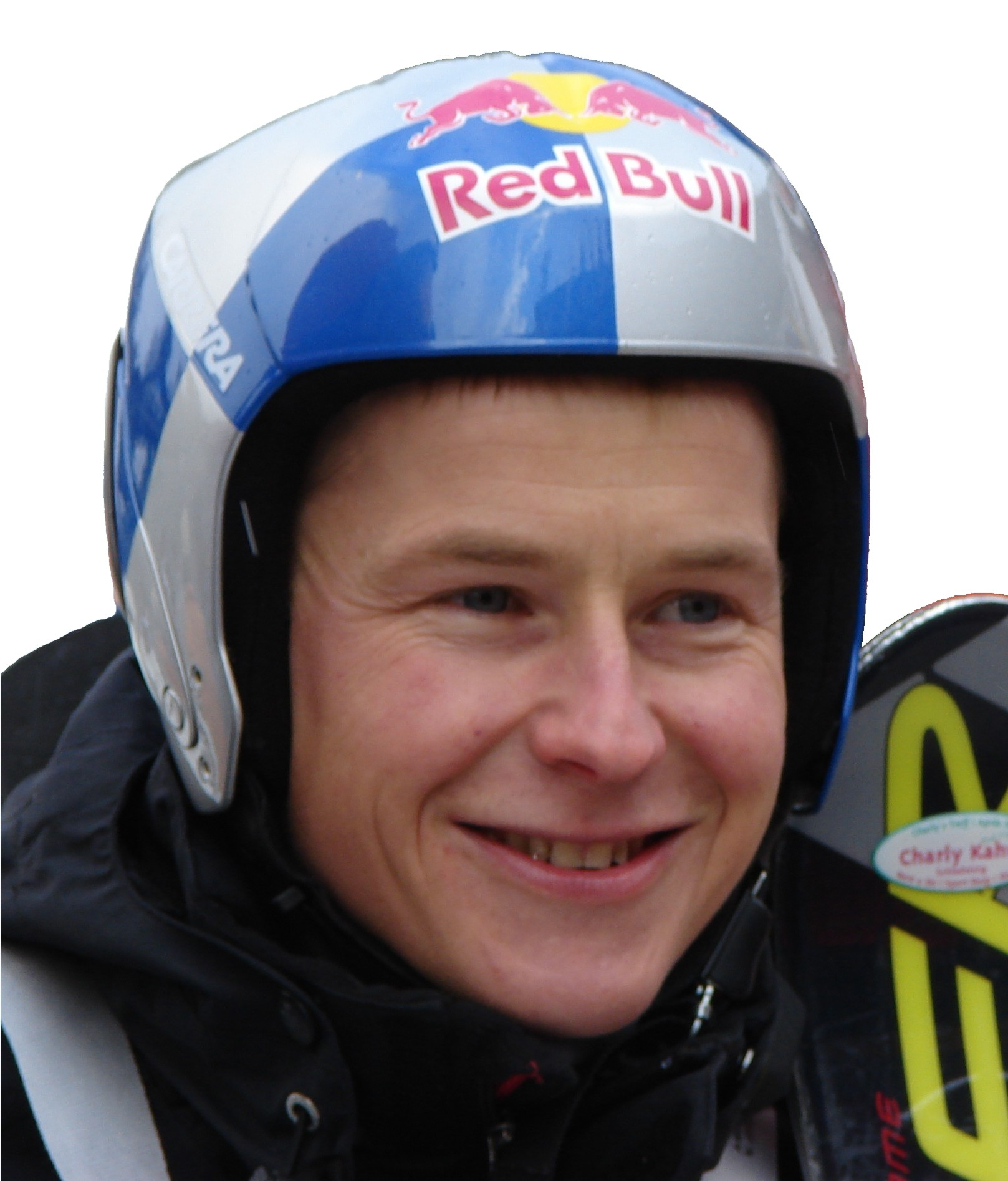
Andreas Goldberger, third in the World Cup standings before the Zakopane events

Prior to the Zakopane events, five individual competitions had been held in the 1999–2000 World Cup season. The overall World Cup leader was Martin Schmitt of Germany, with 360 points, 100 points ahead of Austria's Andreas Widhölzl. Andreas Goldberger, also from Austria, held third place with 213 points. In the Nations Cup, Finland led, followed by Austria and Germany.

Previous World Cup events in the season saw victories by Andreas Widhölzl (twice), Janne Ahonen, Martin Schmitt, and Ville Kantee (once each).

The most recent competition before Zakopane, held on 12 December in Villach, was won by Janne Ahonen, ahead of Martin Schmitt and Andreas Widhölzl. Five Finnish and three Japanese skiers placed in the top ten.

=== World Cup standings before Zakopane ===
World Cup standings before Zakopane events
Rank	Athlete	Country	Points	Deficit to leader
1	Martin Schmitt	Germany	360	–
2	Andreas Widhölzl	Austria	260	100
3	Andreas Goldberger	Austria	213	147
4	Risto Jussilainen	Finland	202	158
5	Ville Kantee	Finland	196	164
6	Matti Hautamäki	Finland	178	182
7	Jani Soininen	Finland	159	201
7	Hideharu Miyahira	Japan	159	201
9	Noriaki Kasai	Japan	139	221
10	Stefan Horngacher	Austria	130	230
11	Janne Ahonen	Finland	126	234
12	Masahiko Harada	Japan	107	253
13	Jussi Hautamäki	Finland	98	262
14	Peter Žonta	Slovenia	92	268
15	Mika Laitinen	Finland	83	277
16	Kazuyoshi Funaki	Japan	81	279
17	Nicolas Dessum	France	76	284
18	Roberto Cecon	Italy	72	288
19	Wolfgang Loitzl	Austria	71	289
20	Hansjörg Jäkle	Germany	60	300
21	Sven Hannawald	Germany	56	304
22	Marco Steinauer	Switzerland	47	313
23	Jérôme Gay	France	45	315
24	Michael Uhrmann	Germany	44	316
25	Robert Mateja	Poland	43	317
26	Roar Ljøkelsøy	Norway	42	318
27	Simon Ammann	Switzerland	41	319
28	Morten Ågheim	Norway	29	331
29	Ivan Lunardi	Italy	24	336
29	Pekka Salminen	Finland	24	336
29	Christof Duffner	Germany	24	336
32	Martin Höllwarth	Austria	22	338
32	Sylvain Freiholz	Switzerland	22	338
34	Alexander Herr	Germany	20	340
34	Bruno Reuteler	Switzerland	20	340
36	Hiroya Saitō	Japan	18	342
36	Łukasz Kruczek	Poland	18	342
38	Damjan Fras	Slovenia	17	343
38	Choi Heung-chul	South Korea	17	343
40	Yuta Watase	Japan	16	344
40	Adam Małysz	Poland	16	344
42	Alan Alborn	United States	14	346
43	Primož Peterka	Slovenia	13	347
43	Dmitriy Vassiliev	Russia	13	347
45	Michal Doležal	Czech Republic	12	348
46	Kazuya Yoshioka	Japan	11	349
46	Gerd Siegmund	Germany	11	349
46	Martin Koch	Austria	11	349
49	Bernhard Metzler	Austria	9	351
50	Bine Norčič	Slovenia	8	352
50	Tommy Ingebrigtsen	Norway	8	352
50	Primož Urh-Zupan	Slovenia	8	352
53	Henning Stensrud	Norway	7	353
54	Jakub Sucháček	Czech Republic	6	354
55	Lasse Ottesen	Norway	1	359
55	Jakub Janda	Czech Republic	1	359

=== Event organization ===
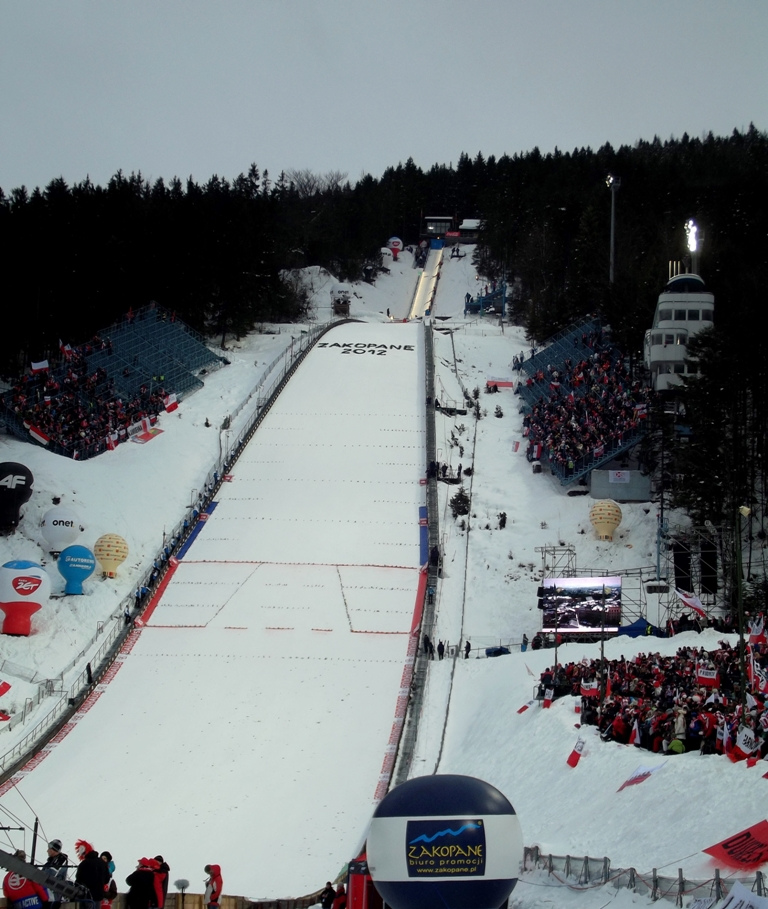
Wielka Krokiew in Zakopane

A week before the event, organizers faced challenges due to a thaw that caused snow to slide off the landing area of the Wielka Krokiew. They successfully restored the hill, and sub-zero temperatures prevented further snow displacement.

Before the competitions, the president of the Polish Ski Association, Paweł Włodarczyk, promised cash bonuses for any Polish skier finishing in the top ten of either event: 10,000 PLN for first place, 9,000 PLN for second, down to 1,000 PLN for tenth.

The Zakopane World Cup events were rescheduled from January to December in the 1999–2000 season due to the expiration of the FIS homologation for the Wielka Krokiew on 31 December 1999.

=== Event schedule ===
The first official training session was scheduled for 17 December 1999, with the second individual competition concluding on 19 December. The program included two individual competitions, two qualifying rounds, and three official training sessions.

== Venue ==
The competitions were held at the Wielka Krokiew, a ski jumping hill named after skier Stanisław Marusarz, located on the northern slope of Krokiew in the Western Tatras. Two individual competitions took place on the large hill. The Wielka Krokiew previously hosted World Cup events in 1980, 1990, 1996, 1998, and January 1999. A planned event in 1981 was canceled.

== Jury ==
The competitions were overseen by the International Ski Federation, with Walter Hofer as the event director and Miran Tepeš as his assistant. The local organizing committee was led by Polish official Lech Pochwała. The technical delegate for all events was Austria's Gert Aigmüller, assisted by American Bill Erickson.

Judge	Country	Judging tower position			
Judge	Country	Qualification for first individual competition (18 December 1999)	First individual competition (18 December 1999)	Qualification for second individual competition (19 December 1999)	Second individual competition (19 December 1999)
Ryszard Guńka	Poland	C	C	B	B
Erkki Mäntyniemi	Finland	B	B	E	E
Ryou Nishikawa	Japan	A	A	C	C
Josef Slavík	Czech Republic	E	E	D	D
Fredi Zarucchi	Switzerland	D	D	A	A

== Competition ==
=== Training sessions (17 December 1999) ===
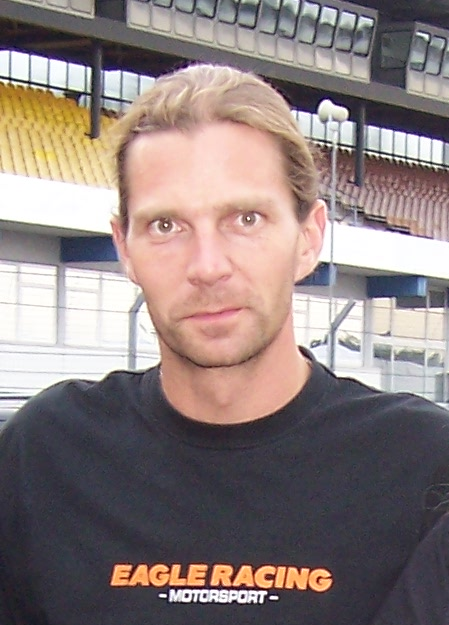
Janne Ahonen, two-time second-place finisher in Zakopane

The first of three training sessions began on Friday, 17 December, at 11:00 AM. Martin Schmitt won the session with a jump of 125 meters.

The second training session ended with the longest jump performed by Janne Ahonen. The Finnish representative landed at the 123-meter mark. One meter shorter was the jump made by the winner of the first training round, Martin Schmitt. Ahonen did not take part in the third training round. In that round, Schmitt reached a distance of 113 meters.

80 out of 84 registered athletes from 17 countries took part in the training sessions.

=== Qualifications for the first individual competition (18 December 1999) ===
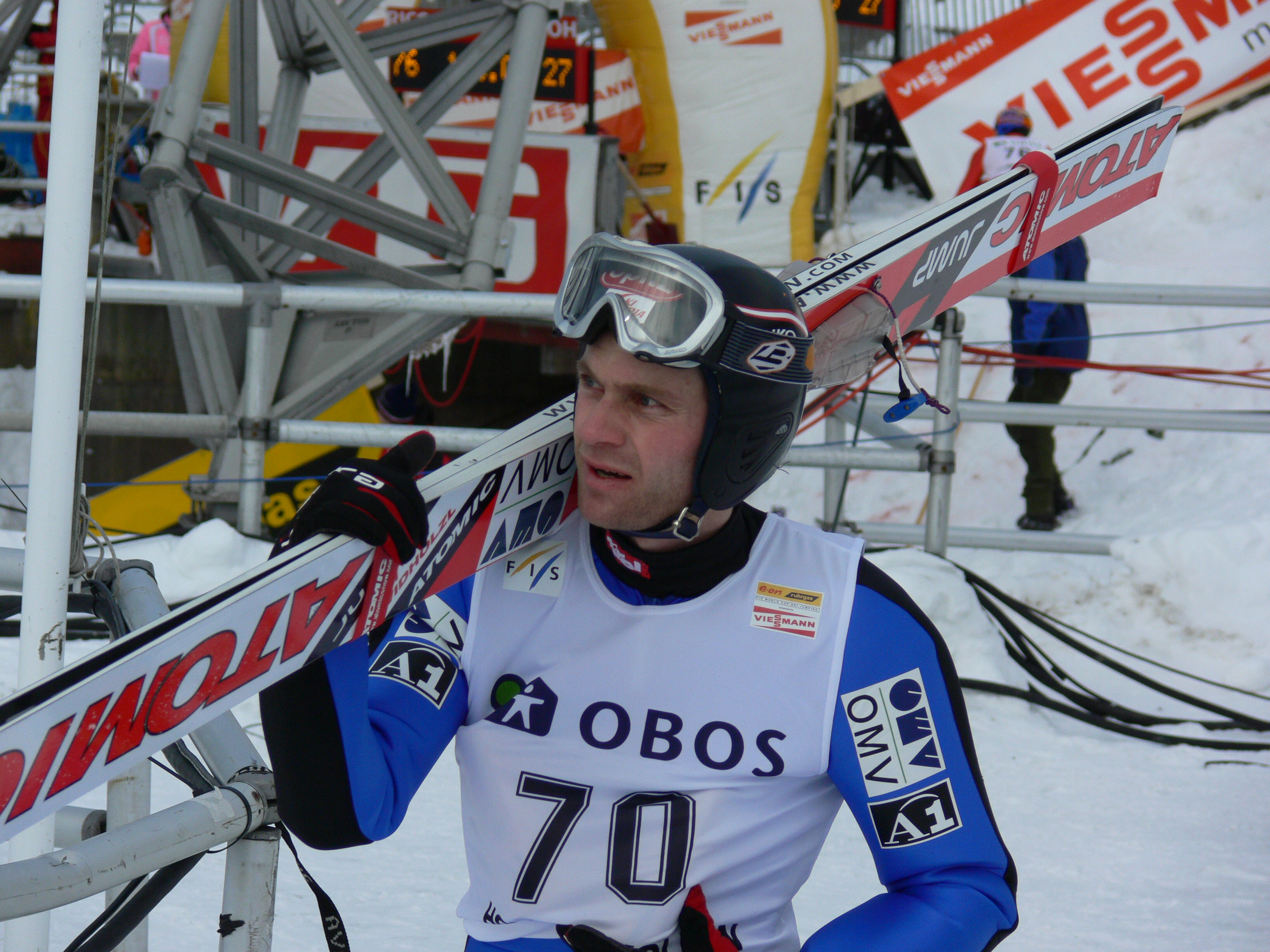
Andreas Widhölzl, third-place finisher in the second competition in Zakopane

The qualification round for the first individual competition began on 18 December at 11:00 AM. It ended with a victory for Andreas Widhölzl. The runner-up in the World Cup standings made a jump of 128 m. A metre shorter was Jaroslav Sakala, who took second place and was the best among those fighting for a spot in the first round of the competition. Third place went to German jumper Martin Schmitt, who achieved 126 m in his attempt. Competitors with guaranteed participation in the event started their jumps from the 11th and 9th starting gates, while those competing for a spot in the event started from the 13th gate.

A total of 81 out of 84 registered athletes from 17 countries took part in the qualification. Despite being on the start list, Primož Peterka, Pekka Salminen, and Matti Hautamäki did not participate. The latter, who was guaranteed a place in the competition due to his sixth position in the World Cup standings, withdrew from the event. As a result, the right to compete went to Ivan Lunardi, who in qualification had placed first among those not advancing to the competition.

=== First individual competition (18 December 1999) ===
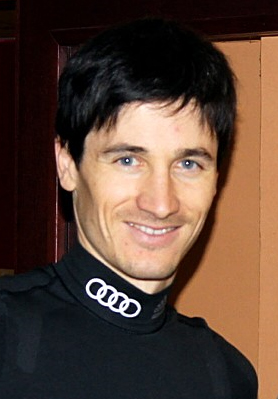
Martin Schmitt, double winner of competitions in Zakopane

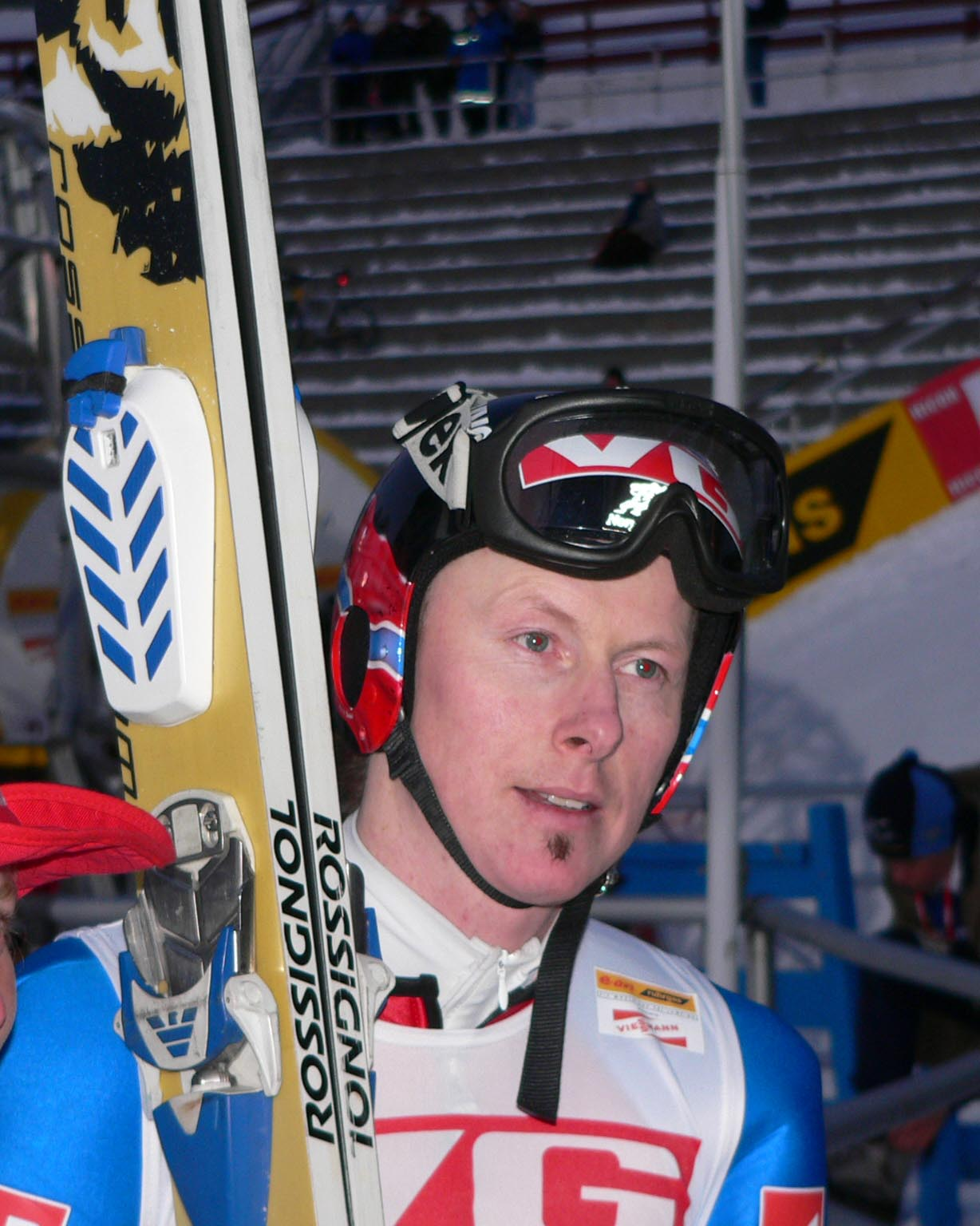
Tommy Ingebrigtsen, 10th place finisher in the first competition in Zakopane

The first individual competition began on 18 December at 1:00 PM. It featured 50 competitors from 13 countries. The event took place in strong winds that frequently changed direction. After jumps by Frank Löffler at 125 metres and Lasse Ottesen at 124.5 metres, the competition jury decided to interrupt the event and lower the start gate from position 10 to position 8.

The first jumper after the restart was Norwayn Henning Stensrud, who reached 108.5 metres. Next was Tommy Ingebrigtsen, who landed 14.5 metres farther than his compatriot and became the new leader. After him came Bine Norčič, whose 113.5 metre jump placed him second. As the competition went on, the tailwind intensified, making conditions increasingly difficult for jumpers. Among those unable to surpass Ingebrigtsen were Primož Urh-Zupan (111.5 m), Michal Doležal (112 m), and Adam Małysz (108 m). Many subsequent jumps were under 100 metres, though Hiroya Saitō (103 m) and Alexander Herr (101 m) managed to pass that mark.

Michael Uhrmann and Roberto Cecon failed to qualify for the second round with jumps of 95.5 and 96 metres respectively. Kazuyoshi Funaki recorded 103 m. With number 71, Mika Laitinen reached 98 m and missed the final. The winner of the January World Cup event in Zakopane, Janne Ahonen, jumped 121.5 m, placing second just 0.7 points behind Ingebrigtsen. Stefan Horngacher jumped 104 m, while Noriaki Kasai managed 96 m and failed to advance. Hideharu Miyahira reached 103 m, Jani Soininen jumped 113.5 m to take third, and Ville Kantee landed at 106.5 m. Risto Jussilainen flew 122.5 m to lead by 0.6 points over Ingebrigtsen, but Andreas Goldberger jumped half a metre farther to take over first. Andreas Widhölzl landed at 110.5 m. World Cup leader Martin Schmitt recorded the longest jump of the round at 123.5 m, giving him the lead by 0.9 points over Goldberger.

Among the 13 jumpers repeating their first-round attempts, Frank Löffler and Lasse Ottesen were best, each reaching 117.5 m and placing sixth and seventh. After the first round, the top three were Schmitt, Goldberger, and Jussilainen, followed by Ingebrigtsen and Ahonen.

The second round began with Jakub Janda, who jumped 87 m. Reinhard Schwarzenberger, next up, landed 12.5 m farther to take the lead. Hansjörg Jäkle, 28th after the first round (100 m), improved by 5.5 m to lead by 12.2 points. Peter Žonta, in 26th, then jumped 3 m farther and moved ahead by 8.1 points. Žonta stayed in front until Hideharu Miyahira, 22nd after round one, jumped 110.5 m. Kazuyoshi Funaki's 103.5 m was not enough to overtake his teammate. Stefan Horngacher, 18th at the halfway mark, tied Miyahira's 110.5 m and took the lead. Ville Kantee followed with 111.5 m to overtake him. Adam Małysz jumped 4.5 m less than Kantee and slotted into second. Andreas Widhölzl, 12th after round one, soared 124 m to take the lead by 33.2 points. Michal Doležal was 6.5 m shorter, and Bine Norčič's 99 m cost him a top spot. Jani Soininen's 109.5 m placed him third, but Lasse Ottesen's 121 m moved him into first by 5.2 points over Widhölzl. Frank Löffler's 98 m left him seventh. Janne Ahonen, fifth after round one, landed at 116 m to take the lead thanks to his earlier advantage and strong style marks. Tommy Ingebrigtsen jumped 20 m less and dropped out of podium contention. Risto Jussilainen's 112 m put him fourth, just ahead of Goldberger, who jumped 108.5 m. Martin Schmitt closed with 123.5 m to win by 16.1 points over Ahonen, with Ottesen in third. This was Schmitt's 12th career World Cup win and second of the season.

=== Qualifications for the second individual competition (19 December 1999) ===
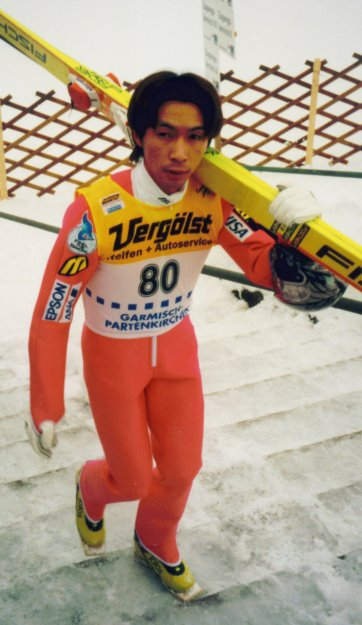
Hideharu Miyahira, fifth-place finisher in the second competition in Zakopane

The qualification round for the second individual competition in Zakopane began on 19 December at 11:00 AM. The winner was Martin Schmitt. The World Cup leader and winner of the first competition jumped 119.5 metres this time. Janne Ahonen from Finland took second place with a jump of 118.5 metres. The third-best qualifier, Kazuyoshi Funaki, reached a distance 5.5 metres shorter. The best jumper among those fighting for a place in the main competition was Mika Laitinen, who took fifth place with a jump of 111.5 metres. All jumpers in the qualification round started their attempts from gate 11.

80 of 82 registered athletes from 17 countries participated in the qualification. Primož Peterka and Andreas Widhölzl did not participate despite being listed. Widhölzl had guaranteed participation in the competition due to his second place in the World Cup standings.

=== Second individual competition (19 December 1999) ===
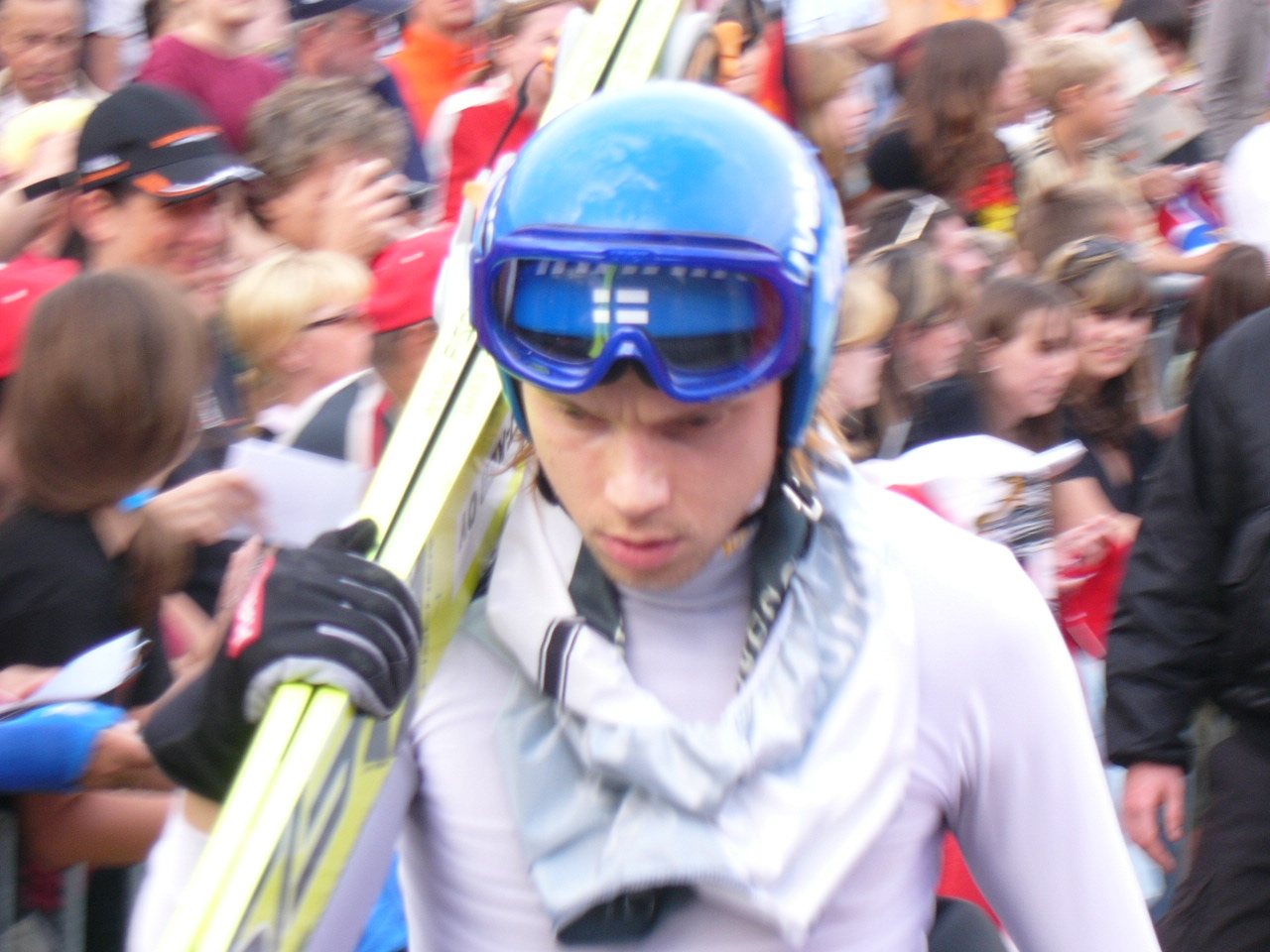
Jussi Hautamäki, 10th-place finisher in the second competition in Zakopane

On 19 December at 12:30 PM, the second individual competition on the Wielka Krokiew hill began. 50 athletes from 10 countries took part. The event started amid snowfall.

The first competitor was Andrzej Młynarczyk, who reached 89.5 metres. Espen Bredesen, starting after him, landed 9.5 metres farther and became the new leader. He was overtaken by the next jumper, Jakub Hlava, who achieved 104.5 metres. The Czech's result was bettered by Jon Petter Sandaker, who jumped half a metre farther to take the lead. The Norwayn stayed in first place until Jaroslav Sakala's jump of 108.5 metres. Reinhard Schwarzenberger, seventh on the start list, jumped 9 metres farther and moved into the lead. The Austrian was not surpassed by, among others, Damjan Fras (105 m), Frank Löffler (89.5 m), Hiroya Saitō (96 m), Tommy Ingebrigtsen (105 m), Lasse Ottesen (111 m), Wolfgang Loitzl (110.5 m) and Mika Laitinen (114 m).

The first to dethrone Schwarzenberger was the 38th competitor, Kazuyoshi Funaki, who reached 117.5 metres. The Japanese jumper was not beaten by his compatriot Noriaki Kasai (114 m). Stefan Horngacher landed six metres shorter and placed in the second ten. Hideharu Miyahira, starting after the Austrian, jumped 119 metres to take the lead by 0.7 points over Funaki. The next jumper, Jani Soininen, landed at 117.5 metres and took third place. Miyahira was then overtaken by Janne Ahonen, who jumped 124.5 metres and beat the Japanese by 11.4 points. Ahonen could not be surpassed by Ville Kantee (121 m), Risto Jussilainen (120 m), Andreas Goldberger (116 m) or Andreas Widhölzl (124 m). The last competitor of the first round, World Cup leader Martin Schmitt, also reached 124.5 metres but trailed Ahonen by 1 point due to lower style marks. At the halfway point, Janne Ahonen led ahead of Martin Schmitt and Andreas Widhölzl.

The second round began with Espen Bredesen, 30th after the first round. The Norwayn jumped 99 metres, which did not keep him in the lead for long, as Alexander Herr, starting immediately after, reached 108.5 metres. The German led until the 26th competitor of the second round, Peter Žonta, jumped 115 metres. The Slovenian stayed in front until Lasse Ottesen, 17th after the first round, also landed at 115 metres but beat Žonta by 14.7 points overall. Jussi Hautamäki, 15th after the first round, matched that distance and took the lead by 2.9 points over Ottesen. 10th after the first round, Andreas Goldberger jumped 115.5 metres and went into first place with a 12-point advantage over Hautamäki. His compatriot Reinhard Schwarzenberger landed at 103 metres and dropped to seventh. Jani Soininen reached 109.5 metres, losing to Goldberger by 8.1 points. Seventh after the first round, Kazuyoshi Funaki jumped 123 metres to take the lead by 19.7 points over Goldberger. Hideharu Miyahira landed 8 metres shorter and took second place. Fifth after the first round, Risto Jussilainen jumped 108.5 metres and finished fourth, behind Funaki, Miyahira and Goldberger. Ville Kantee landed at 112 metres and took third place. Next, Andreas Widhölzl jumped 6.5 metres farther than the Finn before him, taking the lead by 0.6 points over Funaki. Martin Schmitt, second after the first round, reached 126.5 metres and overtook the Austrian by 15.3 points. The last jumper, Janne Ahonen, landed at 121 metres, which was enough for second place, 7.4 points behind Schmitt.

The German became the first ski jumper in history to win two individual events during one World Cup weekend in Zakopane. Right behind Schmitt were Janne Ahonen and Andreas Widhölzl.

== World Cup standings after the competitions in Zakopane ==
Several changes occurred among the top competitors in the World Cup after the competitions in Zakopane. Janne Ahonen advanced from 11th to fourth place, overtaking Risto Jussilainen, Ville Kantee, Matti Hautamäki, Jani Soininen, Hideharu Miyahira, Noriaki Kasai, and Stefan Horngacher. Matti Hautamäki dropped from sixth to ninth place, with Miyahira and Soininen – tied for seventh – moving ahead of him. Horngacher retained 10th place at Kasai's expense. There was one personnel change in the top 15 of the overall World Cup standings: Kazuyoshi Funaki moved up to 12th place, while Masahiko Harada, who had been in that position before the competitions in Poland, fell to 15th, tied with Mika Laitinen.

In the Nations Cup standings, there were no changes at the top: Finland, Austria, and Germany remained in the first three positions.

World Cup standings after the competitions in Zakopane
Rank	Athlete	Country	Points	Deficit to leader
1.	Martin Schmitt	Germany	560	–
2.	Andreas Widhölzl	Austria	370	190
3.	Andreas Goldberger	Austria	289	271
4.	Janne Ahonen	Finland	286	274
5.	Risto Jussilainen	Finland	279	281
6.	Ville Kantee	Finland	265	295
7.	Hideharu Miyahira	Japan	220	340
7.	Jani Soininen	Finland	220	340
9.	Matti Hautamäki	Finland	178	382
10.	Stefan Horngacher	Austria	162	398
11.	Noriaki Kasai	Japan	157	403
12.	Kazuyoshi Funaki	Japan	143	417
13.	Jussi Hautamäki	Finland	138	422
14.	Peter Žonta	Slovenia	120	440
15.	Mika Laitinen	Finland	107	453
15.	Masahiko Harada	Japan	107	453
17.	Wolfgang Loitzl	Austria	101	459
18.	Lasse Ottesen	Norway	83	477
19.	Hansjörg Jäkle	Germany	79	481
20.	Nicolas Dessum	France	76	484
21.	Roberto Cecon	Italy	75	485
22.	Sven Hannawald	Germany	56	504
23.	Michal Doležal	Czech Republic	48	512
24.	Marco Steinauer	Switzerland	47	513
25.	Roar Ljøkelsøy	Norway	45	515
25.	Jérôme Gay	France	45	515
27.	Tommy Ingebrigtsen	Norway	44	516
27.	Michael Uhrmann	Germany	44	516
29.	Robert Mateja	Poland	43	517
30.	Simon Ammann	Switzerland	41	519
31.	Adam Małysz	Poland	36	524
32.	Alexander Herr	Germany	32	528
32.	Primož Urh-Zupan	Slovenia	32	528
34.	Morten Ågheim	Norway	29	531
35.	Sylvain Freiholz	Switzerland	27	533
36.	Ivan Lunardi	Italy	24	536
36.	Hiroya Saitō	Japan	24	536
36.	Pekka Salminen	Finland	24	536
36.	Christof Duffner	Germany	24	536
40.	Martin Koch	Austria	23	537
40.	Bine Norčič	Slovenia	23	537
42.	Martin Höllwarth	Austria	22	538
42.	Frank Löffler	Germany	22	538
42.	Damjan Fras	Slovenia	22	538
45.	Blaž Vrhovnik	Slovenia	21	539
46.	Bruno Reuteler	Switzerland	20	540
47.	Bernhard Metzler	Austria	18	542
47.	Reinhard Schwarzenberger	Austria	18	542
47.	Henning Stensrud	Norway	18	542
47.	Łukasz Kruczek	Poland	18	542
51.	Choi Heung-chul	South Korea	17	543
52.	Yuta Watase	Japan	16	544
53.	Gerd Siegmund	Germany	15	545
54.	Alan Alborn	United States	14	546
55.	Kazuya Yoshioka	Japan	13	547
55.	Primož Peterka	Slovenia	13	547
55.	Dmitriy Vassiliev	Russia	13	547
58.	Jaroslav Sakala	Czech Republic	9	551
59.	Jakub Hlava	Czech Republic	7	553
60.	Jakub Sucháček	Czech Republic	6	554
60.	Jon Petter Sandaker	Norway	6	554
62.	Jakub Janda	Czech Republic	2	558
63.	Espen Bredesen	Norway	1	559

== Team line-ups ==
Of the athletes ranked in the top 15 of the overall World Cup standings, the only one absent from the start list was Masahiko Harada, who before the competitions in Poland occupied 12th place. Initially entered for the event, sixth-ranked Matti Hautamäki ultimately did not compete in any of the Zakopane contests.

As the host of the event, Poland was entitled to enter an additional 10 athletes in the qualification round from the so-called "national quota", granted for two competitions held in the home country. Thus, for the qualifications for each of the two competitions on the Wielka Krokiew hill, there were 14 Polish representatives taking part.

Athlete	Birth date	World Cup rank	Qualifying round		Main competition		Source
Athlete	Birth date	World Cup rank	18 December	19 December	18 December	19 December	Source
Austria (8)
Andreas Goldberger	29 November 1972	3	9	28	6	7	
Martin Höllwarth	13 April 1974	32	15	13	q	33	
Stefan Horngacher	20 September 1969	10	1	3	14	17	
Martin Koch	22 January 1982	46	29	49	q	19	
Wolfgang Loitzl	13 January 1980	19	26	7	21	13	
Bernhard Metzler	13 June 1979	49	–		22	42	
Andreas Widhölzl	14 October 1976	2	4	4	4	3	
Reinhard Schwarzenberger	7 January 1977	–	19	22	29	15	
Czech Republic (4)
Michal Doležal	11 March 1978	45	47	34	7	34	
Jakub Janda	27 April 1978	55	49	33	30	31	
Jakub Hlava	29 December 1979	–	–		39	24	
Jaroslav Sakala	14 July 1969	–	–		34	40	
Belarus (3)
Dimitri Afanasenko	9 March 1981	–	–		q	q	
Alexandr Diadulia	4 November 1982	–	q	q	q	q	
Aleksey Shibko	27 September 1977	–	–		q	q	
Finland (8)
Janne Ahonen	11 May 1977	11	2	1	2	2	
Matti Hautamäki	14 July 1981	6	–		DNSq	–	
Jussi Hautamäki	20 April 1979	13	–		17	10	
Risto Jussilainen	10 June 1975	4	q	50	5	8	
Ville Kantee	8 December 1978	5	–		9	6	
Mika Laitinen	5 March 1973	24	–		24	31	
Pekka Salminen	3 June 1981	29	–		DNSq	–	
Jani Soininen	12 November 1972	15	45	19	35	11	
Netherlands (1)
Niels de Groot	1 May 1981	–	–		q	q	
Germany (6)
Frank Löffler	9 August 1980	–	–		12	39	
Alexander Herr	4 October 1978	34	17	27	27	23	
Hansjörg Jäkle	19 October 1971	20	25	36	23	20	
Martin Schmitt	29 January 1978	1	–		1	1	
Gerd Siegmund	7 February 1973	46	35	29	q	27	
Michael Uhrmann	16 September 1978	24	–		37	46	
Japan (5)
Kazuyoshi Funaki	27 April 1975	16	8	2	19	4	
Noriaki Kasai	6 June 1972	9	5	11	34	14	
Hideharu Miyahira	21 December 1973	7	13	5	15	5	
Hiroya Saitō	1 September 1970	36	20	32	25	32	
Kazuya Yoshioka	9 September 1978	46	12	14	31	29	
Kazakhstan (4)
Stanislav Filimonov	7 June 1979	–	–		45	q	
Pavel Gaiduk	11 February 1976	–	–		q	q	
Juri Rulev	8 December 1978	–	q	q	q	q	
Alexandr Vetrov	1978	–	–		q	q	
South Korea (1)
Choi Heung-chul	3 December 1981	38	–		50	q	
Norway (8)
Morten Ågheim	20 July 1980	28	21	43	32	40	
Espen Bredesen	2 February 1968	–	–		47	30	
Tommy Ingebrigtsen	8 August 1977	50	3	6	10	21	
Roar Ljøkelsøy	31 May 1976	26	–		28	36	
Lasse Ottesen	8 April 1974	55	22	24	3	12	
Olav Magne Dønnem	21 November 1980	–	–		42	q	
Jon Petter Sandaker	24 February 1974	–	–		32	25	
Henning Stensrud	20 August 1977	53	18	20	20	41	
Poland (15)
Łukasz Kruczek	1 November 1975	36	37	25	q	44	
Adam Małysz	3 December 1977	40	27	23	13	38	
Andrzej Młynarczyk	1973	–	32	46	q	37	
Tomasz Pochwała	7 May 1983	–	–		q	q	
Wojciech Skupień	9 March 1976	–	36	41	46	q	
Grzegorz Sobczyk	10 February 1981	–	–		q	–	
Grzegorz Śliwka	19 April 1982	–	–		q	q	
Tomisław Tajner	14 May 1983	–	–		q	q	
Wojciech Tajner	24 June 1980	–	q	q	–	q	
Marcin Bachleda	4 September 1982	–	–		q	q	
Krystian Długopolski	3 August 1980	–	q	q	q	q	
Paweł Kruczek	1 January 1983	–	–		q	q	
Mariusz Maciaś	1 January 1981	–	–		q	q	
Maciej Maciusiak	28 March 1982	–	–		q	q	
Robert Mateja	5 October 1974	25	28	16	40	49	
Russia (4)
Ildar Fatchullin	16 October 1982	–	–		q	q	
Anton Kalinitschenko	22 July 1982	–	–		38	q	
Valery Kobelev	4 March 1973	–	–		q	q	
Dmitriy Vassiliev	26 December 1979	43	–		q	q	
Slovakia (5)
Filip Kafka	26 April 1982	–	–		q	q	
Peter Koštial	29 August 1979	–	–		q	–	
Martin Mesík	17 October 1979	–	46	44	q	q	
Dušan Oršula	23 August 1979	–	q	q	–	q	
Ján Zelenčík	17 October 1979	–	–		q	q	
Slovenia (6)
Damjan Fras	21 February 1973	38	q	47	49	26	
Bine Norčič	16 March 1981	50	–		16	43	
Primož Peterka	28 February 1979	43	30	q	DNSq	DNSq	
Primož Urh-Zupan	22 January 1983	50	23	37	11	47	
Blaž Vrhovnik	8 May 1981	–	–		24	17	
Peter Žonta	9 January 1979	14	16	9	18	16	
Switzerland (3)
Simon Ammann	25 June 1981	27	–		44	48	
Sylvain Freiholz	23 November 1974	32	–		26	35	
Marco Steinauer	13 April 1976	22	–		48	50	
Ukraine (3)
Volodymyr Boshchuk	3 August 1982	–	–		q	q	
Ivan Kozlov	6 May 1978	–	42	q	q	q	
Alexandr Popuk	6 April 1976	–	–		q	q	
Italy (2)
Roberto Cecon	28 December 1971	18	–		36	28	
Ivan Lunardi	15 May 1973	29	–		43	45	

Legend
q – Athlete did not qualify for the main competition
– – Athlete was not entered in the qualifying round
DNSq – Athlete was entered but did not start in the qualifying round
