= Nordic Tournament 2001 =

The 2001 Nordic Tournament was the fourth edition and took place in Falun, Trondheim and Oslo between 7–11 March 2000.

== Results ==
Date	Place	Hill	Size	Winner	Second	Third	Ref.
7 Mar 2001	(Sweden) Falun	Lugnet K-115 (night)	LH	(Poland) Adam Małysz	(Germany) Martin Schmitt	(Austria) Wolfgang Loitzl	
9 Mar 2001	(Norway) Trondheim	Granåsen K-120 (night)	LH	(Poland) Adam Małysz	(Austria) Andreas Goldberger	(Slovenia) Igor Medved	
11 Mar 2001	(Norway) Oslo	Holmenkollbakken K-115	LH	(Poland) Adam Małysz	(Austria) Stefan Horngacher	(Germany) Martin Schmitt	

== Overall ==
Pos	Ski Jumper	Points
1	(Poland) Adam Małysz	648.5
2	(Austria) Andreas Goldberger	575.8
3	(Germany) Martin Schmitt	486.9
4	(Finland) Risto Jussilainen	483.6
5	(Finland) Veli-Matti Lindström	459.8
6	(Austria) Stefan Horngacher	452.5
7	(Slovenia) Igor Medved	435.7
8	(Japan) Kazuhiro Nakamura	435.1
9	(Austria) Wolfgang Loitzl	431.9
10	(Switzerland) Sylvain Freiholz	430.6
