= 2001–02 FIS Ski Jumping World Cup =

Ski jumping championship season

Winners
- World Cup: (Poland) Adam Małysz
- Four Hills Tournament: (Germany) Sven Hannawald
- Nordic Tournament: (Finland) Matti Hautamäki
- Nations Cup: Germany

Competitions
- Venues: 18
- Individual: 22
- Team: 5
- Cancelled: 1

The 2001–02 FIS Ski Jumping World Cup was the 23rd World Cup season in ski jumping and was held without any ski flying individual event this season (for the third time in history).

The season began on 23 November 2001 at Puijo in Kuopio, Finland, and finished on 24 March 2002 at Letalnica bratov Gorišek in Planica, Slovenia. Adam Małysz was the individual World Cup overall winner, for the second consecutive season. The Nations Cup was won by the Team of Germany.

22 men's individual events on 18 different venues in 10 countries were held on two different continents (Europe and Asia). The only ski flying event was cancelled due to bad weather (3rd season after 1987/88 and 1989/90 without individual ski flying). And 5 men's team events.

German ski jumper Sven Hannawald became the first in history to win the "grand slam" of all four competitions at Four Hills Tournament (at the 50th anniversary edition).

Peaks of the season were Winter Olympics, FIS Ski Flying World Championships (only two of four rounds held due to bad weather), Four Hills Tournament and Nordic Tournament.

== Calendar ==
=== Men's Individual ===
N – normal hill / L – large hill / F – flying hill
All	No.	Date	Place (Hill)	Size	Winner	Second	Third	Overall leader	R.
510	1	23 November 2001	(Finland) Kuopio (Puijo K120)	L _{320}	(Poland) Adam Małysz	(Germany) Martin Schmitt	(Japan) Kazuyoshi Funaki	(Poland) Adam Małysz	
511	2	24 November 2001	(Finland) Kuopio (Puijo K120)	L _{321}	(Finland) Risto Jussilainen	(Poland) Adam Małysz	(Austria) Martin Höllwarth	(Poland) Adam Małysz	
512	3	1 December 2001	(Germany) Titisee-Neustadt (Hochfirstschanze K120)	L _{322}	(Poland) Adam Małysz	(Germany) Martin Schmitt	(Germany) Stephan Hocke	(Poland) Adam Małysz	
513	4	2 December 2001	(Germany) Titisee-Neustadt (Hochfirstschanze K120)	L _{323}	(Germany) Sven Hannawald	(Poland) Adam Małysz	(Austria) Andreas Goldberger	(Poland) Adam Małysz	
514	5	8 December 2001	(Austria) Villach (Villacher Alpenarena K90)	N _{140}	(Poland) Adam Małysz	(Finland) Matti Hautamäki	(Japan) Kazuyoshi Funaki	(Poland) Adam Małysz	
515	6	15 December 2001	(Switzerland) Engelberg (Gross-Titlis-Schanze K120)	L _{324}	(Germany) Stephan Hocke	(Germany) Sven Hannawald	(Finland) Matti Hautamäki	(Poland) Adam Małysz	
516	7	16 December 2001	(Switzerland) Engelberg (Gross-Titlis-Schanze K120)	L _{325}	(Poland) Adam Małysz	(Switzerland) Simon Ammann	(Austria) Martin Koch	(Poland) Adam Małysz	
517	8	21 December 2001	(Italy) Predazzo (Trampolino dal Ben K120)	L _{326}	(Poland) Adam Małysz	(Austria) Andreas Widhölzl	(Switzerland) Simon Ammann	(Poland) Adam Małysz	
518	9	22 December 2001	(Italy) Predazzo (Trampolino dal Ben K120)	L _{327}	(Poland) Adam Małysz	(Switzerland) Simon Ammann	(Austria) Andreas Widhölzl	(Poland) Adam Małysz	
519	10	30 December 2001	(Germany) Oberstdorf (Schattenbergschanze K115)	L _{328}	(Germany) Sven Hannawald	(Austria) Martin Höllwarth	(Switzerland) Simon Ammann	(Poland) Adam Małysz	
520	11	1 January 2002	(Germany) Garmisch-Pa (Große Olympiaschanze K115)	L _{329}	(Germany) Sven Hannawald	(Austria) Andreas Widhölzl	(Poland) Adam Małysz	(Poland) Adam Małysz	
521	12	4 January 2002	(Austria) Innsbruck (Bergiselschanze K120)	L _{330}	(Germany) Sven Hannawald	(Poland) Adam Małysz	(Austria) Martin Höllwarth	(Poland) Adam Małysz	
522	13	6 January 2002	(Austria) Bischofshofen (Paul-Ausserleitner K125)	L _{331}	(Germany) Sven Hannawald	(Finland) Matti Hautamäki	(Austria) Martin Höllwarth	(Poland) Adam Małysz	
50th Four Hills Tournament Overall (30 December 2001 – 6 January 2002)					(Germany) Sven Hannawald	(Finland) Matti Hautamäki	(Austria) Martin Höllwarth	4H Tournament	
523	14	12 January 2002	(Germany) Willingen (Mühlenkopfschanze K130)	L _{332}	(Germany) Sven Hannawald	(Finland) Matti Hautamäki	(Finland) Veli-Matti Lindström	(Poland) Adam Małysz	
524	15	19 January 2002	(Poland) Zakopane (Wielka Krokiew K120)	L _{333}	(Finland) Matti Hautamäki	(Germany) Sven Hannawald	(Austria) Andreas Widhölzl	(Poland) Adam Małysz	
525	16	20 January 2002	(Poland) Zakopane (Wielka Krokiew K120)	L _{334}	(Poland) Adam Małysz	(Germany) Sven Hannawald	(Finland) Matti Hautamäki	(Poland) Adam Małysz	
526	17	24 January 2002	(Japan) Hakuba (Olympic Hills K120)	L _{335}	(Austria) Andreas Widhölzl	(Austria) Martin Koch	(Austria) Stefan Horngacher	(Poland) Adam Małysz	
527	18	26 January 2002	(Japan) Sapporo (Ōkurayama K120)	L _{336}	(Austria) Andreas Widhölzl	(Austria) Martin Koch	(Japan) Noriaki Kasai	(Poland) Adam Małysz	
2002 Winter Olympics (10 – 13 February • (United States) Salt Lake City)
528	19	1 March 2002	(Finland) Lahti (Salpausselkä K116)	L _{337}	(Germany) Martin Schmitt	(Poland) Adam Małysz	(Slovenia) Robert Kranjec	(Poland) Adam Małysz	
FIS Ski Flying World Championships 2002 (9 March • (Czech Republic) Harrachov)
529	20	13 March 2002	(Sweden) Falun (Lugnet K115)	L _{338}	(Finland) Matti Hautamäki	(Germany) Martin Schmitt	(Germany) Sven Hannawald	(Poland) Adam Małysz	
530	21	15 March 2002	(Norway) Trondheim (Granåsen K120)	L _{339}	(Finland) Matti Hautamäki	(Poland) Adam Małysz	(Germany) Sven Hannawald	(Poland) Adam Małysz	
531	22	17 March 2002	(Norway) Oslo (Holmenkollbakken K115)	L _{340}	(Switzerland) Simon Ammann	(Germany) Sven Hannawald	(Poland) Adam Małysz	(Poland) Adam Małysz	
6th Nordic Tournament Overall (1 – 17 March 2002)					(Finland) Matti Hautamäki	(Poland) Adam Małysz	(Germany) Martin Schmitt	Nordic Tournament	
		24 March 2002	(Slovenia) Planica (Letalnica bratov Gorišek K185)	F _{cnx}	cancelled due to bad weather			—	
23rd FIS World Cup Overall (23 November 2001 – 17 March 2002)					(Poland) Adam Małysz	(Germany) Sven Hannawald	(Finland) Matti Hautamäki	World Cup Overall	

=== Men's Team ===
All	No.	Date	Place (Hill)	Size	Winner	Second	Third	R.
21	1	9 December 2001	(Austria) Villach (Villacher Alpenarena K90)	21	Finland Veli-Matti Lindström; Toni Nieminen; Matti Hautamäki; Risto Jussilainen	Japan Kazuya Yoshioka; Hideharu Miyahira; Noriaki Kasai; Kazuyoshi Funaki	Poland Robert Mateja; Wojciech Skupień; Łukasz Kruczek; Adam Małysz	
22	2	13 January 2002	(Germany) Willingen (Mühlenkopfschanze K130)	L_{001}	Austria Martin Höllwarth; Andreas Goldberger; Stefan Horngacher; Andreas Widhölzl	Finland Veli-Matti Lindström; Tami Kiuru; Janne Ahonen; Matti Hautamäki	Germany Christof Duffner; Stephan Hocke; Sven Hannawald; Martin Schmitt	
23	3	27 January 2002	(Japan) Sapporo (Ōkurayama K120)	L_{020}	Austria Stefan Horngacher; Wolfgang Loitzl; Martin Koch; Andreas Widhölzl	Japan Hideharu Miyahira; Hiroki Yamada; Noriaki Kasai; Kazuyoshi Funaki	Finland Jussi Hautamäki; Pekka Salminen; Kimmo Yliriesto; Janne Ylijärvi	
24	4	2 March 2002	(Finland) Lahti (Salpausselkä K116)	L_{021}	Finland Matti Hautamäki; Veli-Matti Lindström; Risto Jussilainen; Janne Ahonen	Slovenia Primož Peterka; Igor Medved; Robert Kranjec; Peter Žonta	Germany Christof Duffner; Stephan Hocke; Michael Uhrmann; Martin Schmitt	
25	5	23 March 2002	(Slovenia) Planica (Letalnica bratov Gorišek K185)	F_{003}	Finland Matti Hautamäki; Veli-Matti Lindström; Risto Jussilainen; Janne Ahonen	Germany Christof Duffner; Martin Schmitt; Michael Uhrmann; Sven Hannawald	Austria Martin Koch; Andreas Widhölzl; Andreas Goldberger; Wolfgang Loitzl	

== Standings ==
=== Overall ===
Rank	after 22 events	Points
1	(Poland) Adam Małysz	1475
2	(Germany) Sven Hannawald	1259
3	(Finland) Matti Hautamäki	1048
4	(Austria) Andreas Widhölzl	874
5	(Germany) Martin Schmitt	795
6	(Austria) Martin Höllwarth	737
7	(Switzerland) Simon Ammann	628
8	(Austria) Martin Koch	561
9	(Germany) Stephan Hocke	508
10	(Finland) Risto Jussilainen	474

=== Four Hills Tournament ===
Rank	after 4 events	Points
1	(Germany) Sven Hannawald	1077.6
2	(Finland) Matti Hautamäki	1021.0
3	(Austria) Martin Höllwarth	1015.8
4	(Poland) Adam Małysz	992.8
5	(Austria) Andreas Widhölzl	980.4
6	(Switzerland) Simon Ammann	961.4
7	(Germany) Martin Schmitt	957.5
8	(Finland) Risto Jussilainen	923.6
9	(Austria) Andreas Goldberger	918.5
10	(Germany) Stephan Hocke	914.8

=== Nordic Tournament ===
Rank	after 4 events	Points
1	(Finland) Matti Hautamäki	277
2	(Poland) Adam Małysz	265
3	(Germany) Martin Schmitt	256
4	(Switzerland) Simon Ammann	226
5	(Finland) Janne Ahonen	205
6	(Germany) Sven Hannawald	200
7	(Slovenia) Robert Kranjec	169
8	(Germany) Christof Duffner (Finland) Risto Jussilainen	88
10	(Japan) Kazuyoshi Funaki	79

=== Prize money ===
Rank	after 27 events	CHF
1	(Poland) Adam Małysz	287,265
2	(Germany) Sven Hannawald	279,000
3	(Finland) Matti Hautamäki	166,250
4	(Austria) Andreas Widhölzl	109,500
5	(Germany) Martin Schmitt	96,000
6	(Switzerland) Simon Ammann	86,000
7	(Austria) Martin Höllwarth	63,375
8	(Germany) Stephan Hocke	49,125
9	(Austria) Martin Koch	44,250
10	(Austria) Andreas Goldberger	32,500

=== Nations Cup ===
Rank	after 27 events	Points
1	Germany	4812
2	Austria	4761
3	Finland	4691
4	Japan	2721
5	Slovenia	2188
6	Poland	2105
7	Norway	897
8	Switzerland	779
9	Russia	533
10	France	378

== See also ==
- 2001 Grand Prix (top level summer series)
- 2001–02 FIS Continental Cup (2nd level competition)
