= Audenrieth =

Audenrieth is a surname. Notable people with the surname include:

- Roland Audenrieth (born 1979), German ski-jumper
- Georg Audenrieth, (1917–1999) German World War II military Feldwebel
