= 2000–01 FIS Ski Jumping World Cup =

Ski jumping championship season

2000–01 World Cup
Winners
- Overall: (Poland) Adam Małysz
- Ski Flying: (Germany) Martin Schmitt
- Four Hills Tournament: (Poland) Adam Małysz
- Nordic Tournament: (Poland) Adam Małysz
- Nations Cup: Finland

Competitions
- Venues: 17
- Individual: 21
- Team: 4
- Cancelled: 5
- Rescheduled: 2

The 2000–01 FIS Ski Jumping World Cup was the 22nd World Cup season in ski jumping and the 11th official World Cup season in ski flying with the eleventh small crystal globe awarded.

The season began in Kuopio, Finland on 24 November 2000 and finished in Planica, Slovenia on 18 March 2001. The individual World Cup overall winner was Adam Małysz (first for Poland) and he also won Four Hills Tournament and Nordic Tournament, small crystal globe in ski flying went to Martin Schmitt. The Nations Cup was taken by Team of Finland.

21 men's individual events on 14 different venues in 9 countries were held on three different continents (Europe, Asia and North America). The season began with many weather problems as both events from Lillehammer were rescheduled to Kuopio (due to lack of snow); and five events held in total in Ramsau am Dachstein, Engelberg and Liberec were cancelled due to high temperatures and a lack of snow. Also four men's team events were held.

For the first and only time in history, the Nations Cup standings were based exclusively on points earned in team competitions. In the end, only four of the six scheduled team competitions were held.

Peaks of the season were FIS Nordic World Ski Championships, Four Hills Tournament and Nordic Tournament.

== Map of world cup hosts ==
Europe
Germany	Austria United States	Asia

== Calendar ==
=== Men's Individual ===
N – normal hill / L – large hill / F – flying hill
All	No.	Date	Place (Hill)	Size	Winner	Second	Third	Overall leader	R.
489	1	24 November 2000	(Finland) Kuopio (Puijo K120)	L _{304}	(Germany) Martin Schmitt	(Germany) Sven Hannawald	(Austria) Andreas Widhölzl	(Germany) Martin Schmitt	
490	2	(Note: Cancelled team event from Lillehammer (2 December) was rescheduled to Kuopio as individual event on the same day.)2 December 2000	(Finland) Kuopio (Puijo K120)	L _{305}	(Finland) Matti Hautamäki	(Japan) Noriaki Kasai	(Germany) Michael Uhrmann	(Finland) Matti Hautamäki	
		3 December 2000	(Norway) Lillehammer (Lysgårdsbakken K120)	L _{cnx}	lack of snow; rescheduled to Kuopio			—	
491	3	(Note: Cancelled event from Lillehammer (3 December) was rescheduled to Kuopio on the same day.)3 December 2000	(Finland) Kuopio (Puijo K120)	L _{306}	(Germany) Martin Schmitt	(Finland) Janne Ahonen	(Finland) Ville Kantee	(Germany) Martin Schmitt	
		8 December 2000	(Austria) Ramsau (W90-Mattensprungan. K90)	N _{cnx}	lack of snow and high temperatures			—	
		10 December 2000	(Czech Republic) Liberec (Ještěd A K120)	L _{cnx}	lack of snow and high temperatures			—	
		16 December 2000	(Switzerland) Engelberg (Gross-Titlis-Schanze K120)	L _{cnx}	lack of snow and high temperatures			—	
		17 December 2000	(Switzerland) Engelberg (Gross-Titlis-Schanze K120)	L _{cnx}	lack of snow and high temperatures			—	
492	4	29 December 2000	(Germany) Oberstdorf (Schattenbergschanze K115)	L _{307}	(Germany) Martin Schmitt	(Japan) Noriaki Kasai	(Japan) Masahiko Harada	(Germany) Martin Schmitt	
493	5	1 January 2001	(Germany) Garmisch-Pa (Große Olympiaschanze K115)	L _{308}	(Japan) Noriaki Kasai	(Russia) Dimitry Vassiliev	(Poland) Adam Małysz	(Germany) Martin Schmitt	
494	6	4 January 2001	(Austria) Innsbruck (Bergiselschanze K110)	L _{309}	(Poland) Adam Małysz	(Finland) Janne Ahonen	(Japan) Noriaki Kasai	(Germany) Martin Schmitt	
495	7	6 January 2001	(Austria) Bischofshofen (Paul-Ausserleitner K120)	L _{310}	(Poland) Adam Małysz	(Finland) Janne Ahonen	(Austria) Andreas Widhölzl	(Germany) Martin Schmitt	
49th Four Hills Tournament Overall (29 December 2000 – 6 January 2001)					(Poland) Adam Małysz	(Finland) Janne Ahonen	(Germany) Martin Schmitt	4H Tournament	
496	8	13 January 2001	(Czech Republic) Harrachov (Čerťák K185)	F _{047}	(Poland) Adam Małysz	(Germany) Martin Schmitt	(Finland) Risto Jussilainen	(Germany) Martin Schmitt	
497	9	13 January 2001	(Czech Republic) Harrachov (Čerťák K185)	F _{048}	(Poland) Adam Małysz	(Finland) Janne Ahonen	(Germany) Martin Schmitt	(Germany) Martin Schmitt	
498	10	20 January 2001	(United States) Park City (Utah Olympic Park K120)	L _{311}	(Poland) Adam Małysz	(Austria) Wolfgang Loitzl	(Japan) Kazuya Yoshioka	(Poland) Adam Małysz	
499	11	24 January 2001	(Japan) Hakuba (Olympic Hills K120)	L _{312}	(Germany) Martin Schmitt	(Finland) Risto Jussilainen	(Austria) Andreas Widhölzl	(Germany) Martin Schmitt	
500	12	27 January 2001	(Japan) Sapporo (Ōkurayama K120)	L _{313}	(Poland) Adam Małysz	(Austria) Wolfgang Loitzl	(Finland) Jussi Hautamäki	(Poland) Adam Małysz	
501	13	28 January 2001	(Japan) Sapporo (Ōkurayama K120)	L _{314}	(Poland) Adam Małysz	(Finland) Risto Jussilainen	(Finland) Jani Soininen	(Poland) Adam Małysz	
502	14	3 February 2001	(Germany) Willingen (Mühlenkopfschanze K120)	L _{315}	(Finland) Ville Kantee	(Poland) Adam Małysz	(Finland) Risto Jussilainen	(Poland) Adam Małysz	
503	15	4 February 2001	(Germany) Willingen (Mühlenkopfschanze K120)	L _{316}	(Poland) Adam Małysz	(Finland) Risto Jussilainen	(Finland) Matti Hautamäki	(Poland) Adam Małysz	
FIS Nordic World Ski Championships 2001 (19 – 23 February • (Finland) Lahti)
504	16	3 March 2001	(Germany) Oberstdorf (Heini-Klopfer K185)	F _{049}	(Finland) Risto Jussilainen	(Finland) Veli-Matti Lindström	(Finland) Matti Hautamäki	(Poland) Adam Małysz	
505	17	4 March 2001	(Germany) Oberstdorf (Heini-Klopfer K185)	F _{050}	(Germany) Martin Schmitt	(Poland) Adam Małysz	(Finland) Risto Jussilainen	(Poland) Adam Małysz	
506	18	7 March 2001	(Sweden) Falun (Lugnet K115)	L _{317}	(Poland) Adam Małysz	(Germany) Martin Schmitt	(Austria) Wolfgang Loitzl	(Poland) Adam Małysz	
507	19	9 March 2001	(Norway) Trondheim (Granåsen K120)	L _{318}	(Poland) Adam Małysz	(Austria) Andreas Goldberger	(Slovenia) Igor Medved	(Poland) Adam Małysz	
508	20	11 March 2001	(Norway) Oslo (Holmenkollbakken K115)	L _{319}	(Poland) Adam Małysz	(Austria) Stefan Horngacher	(Germany) Martin Schmitt	(Poland) Adam Małysz	
5th Nordic Tournament Overall (7–11 March 2001)					(Poland) Adam Małysz	(Austria) A. Goldberger	(Germany) Martin Schmitt	Nordic Tournament	
509	21	18 March 2001	(Slovenia) Planica (Velikanka b. Gorišek K185)	F _{051}	(Germany) Martin Schmitt	(Finland) Risto Jussilainen	(Norway) Tommy Ingebrigtsen	(Poland) Adam Małysz	
22nd FIS World Cup Overall (24 November 2000 – 18 March 2001)					(Poland) Adam Małysz	(Germany) Martin Schmitt	(Finland) Risto Jussilainen	World Cup Overall	

=== Men's Team ===
All	No.	Date	Place (Hill)	Size	Winner	Second	Third	R.
17	1	25 November 2000	(Finland) Kuopio (Puijo K120)	L _{016}	Norway Roar Ljøkelsøy; Olav Magne Dønnem; Lasse Ottesen; Tommy Ingebrigtsen	Austria Wolfgang Loitzl; Martin Koch; Stefan Horngacher; Andreas Widhölzl	Finland Matti Hautamäki; Ville Kantee; Jani Soininen; Janne Ahonen	
		2 December 2000	(Norway) Lillehammer (Lysgårdsbakken K120)	L _{cnx}	lack of snow; rescheduled to Kuopio as individual competition			
		9 December 2000	(Czech Republic) Liberec (Ještěd A K120)	L _{cnx}	lack of snow and high temperatures			
18	2	19 January 2001	(United States) Park City (Utah Olympic Park K120)	L _{017}	Japan Kazuyoshi Funaki; Kazuya Yoshioka; Masahiko Harada; Noriaki Kasai	Finland Jani Soininen; Jussi Hautamäki; Risto Jussilainen; Janne Ahonen	Austria Wolfgang Loitzl; Andreas Widhölzl; Martin Höllwarth; Stefan Horngacher	
19	3	2 February 2001	(Germany) Willingen (Mühlenkopfschanze K120)	L _{018}	Finland Ville Kantee; Jussi Hautamäki; Jani Soininen; Risto Jussilainen	Austria Martin Höllwarth; Stefan Horngacher; Wolfgang Loitzl; Andreas Widhölzl	Japan Kazuyoshi Funaki; Kazuya Yoshioka; Hideharu Miyahira; Noriaki Kasai	
20	4	17 March 2001	(Slovenia) Planica (Letalnica bratov Gorišek K185)	F _{002}	Finland Jussi Hautamäki; Risto Jussilainen; Tami Kiuru; Veli-Matti Lindström	Austria Wolfgang Loitzl; Andreas Goldberger; Martin Koch; Stefan Horngacher	Japan Hideharu Miyahira; Kazuya Yoshioka; Masahiko Harada; Noriaki Kasai	

== Standings ==
=== Overall ===
Rank	after 21 events	Points
1	(Poland) Adam Małysz	1531
2	(Germany) Martin Schmitt	1173
3	(Finland) Risto Jussilainen	938
4	(Japan) Noriaki Kasai	728
5	(Finland) Janne Ahonen	686
6	(Finland) Matti Hautamäki	648
7	(Austria) Wolfgang Loitzl	614
8	(Austria) Stefan Horngacher	566
9	(Germany) Sven Hannawald	462
10	(Finland) Jani Soininen	394

=== Ski Flying ===
Rank	after 5 events	Points
1	(Germany) Martin Schmitt	385
2	(Poland) Adam Małysz	380
3	(Finland) Risto Jussilainen	345
4	(Finland) Matti Hautamäki	186
5	(Norway) Tommy Ingebrigtsen	169
6	(Finland) Janne Ahonen	151
7	(Austria) Andreas Goldberger	137
8	(Japan) Noriaki Kasai	126
9	(Germany) Sven Hannawald	116
10	(Finland) Veli-Matti Lindström	112

=== Nations Cup ===
Rank	after 4 events	Points
1	Finland	680
2	Austria	600
3	Japan	530
4	Norway	460
5	Germany	370
6	Poland	260
7	Slovenia	100

=== Four Hills Tournament ===
Rank	after 4 events	Points
1	(Poland) Adam Małysz	1045.9
2	(Finland) Janne Ahonen	941.5
3	(Germany) Martin Schmitt	920.1
4	(Germany) Sven Hannawald	885.3
5	(Austria) Stefan Horngacher	884.5
6	(Finland) Matti Hautamäki	856.8
7	(Finland) Risto Jussilainen	826.5
8	(Austria) Martin Höllwarth	805.6
9	(Austria) Wolfgang Loitzl	791.7
10	(Norway) Tommy Ingebrigtsen	782,.9

=== Nordic Tournament ===
Rank	after 3 events	Points
1	(Poland) Adam Małysz	648.5
2	(Austria) Andreas Goldberger	575.8
3	(Germany) Martin Schmitt	486.9
4	(Finland) Risto Jussilainen	483.6
5	(Finland) Veli-Matti Lindström	459.8
6	(Austria) Stefan Horngacher	452.5
7	(Slovenia) Igor Medved	435.7
8	(Japan) Kazuhiro Nakamura	435.1
9	(Austria) Wolfgang Loitzl	431.9
10	(Switzerland) Sylvain Freiholz	430.6

== See also ==
- 2000 Grand Prix (top level summer series)
- 1999–2000 FIS Continental Cup (2nd level competition)
