= 2001 FIS Ski Jumping Grand Prix =

International ski jumping competition

Ski Jumping Grand Prix 2001
Winners
- Overall: (Poland) Adam Małysz
- Nations Cup: Austria

Competitions
- Venues: 5
- Individual: 7

The 2001 FIS Ski Jumping Grand Prix was the 8th Summer Grand Prix season in ski jumping on plastic. Season began on 11 August 2001 in Hinterzarten, Germany and ended on 9 September 2001 in Hakuba, Japan.

== Calendar ==
=== Men ===
| No. | Season | Date | Place | Hill | Size | Winner | Second | Third | Yellow bib | Det. |
|---|---|---|---|---|---|---|---|---|---|---|
| 37 | 1 | 11 August 2001 | (Germany) Hinterzarten | Rothaus-Schanze K-95 | NH | (Poland) Adam Małysz | (Germany) Martin Schmitt | (Austria) Stefan Horngacher | (Poland) Adam Małysz | |
| 38 | 2 | 12 August 2001 | (Germany) Hinterzarten | Rothaus-Schanze K-95 | NH | (Austria) Martin Höllwarth | (Austria) Andreas Goldberger | (Germany) Martin Schmitt | (Germany) Martin Schmitt | |
| 39 | 3 | 14 August 2001 | (France) Courchevel | Tremplin du Praz K-120 | LH | (Austria) Andreas Widhölzl | (Poland) Adam Małysz | (Finland) Janne Ahonen | (Poland) Adam Małysz | |
| 40 | 4 | 18 August 2001 | (Austria) Stams | Brunnentalschanze K-105 | LH | (Italy) Roberto Cecon | (Austria) Martin Höllwarth | (Slovenia) Igor Medved | (Poland) Adam Małysz | |
| 41 | 5 | 5 September 2001 | (Japan) Sapporo | Okurayama K-120 | LH | (Austria) Stefan Horngacher | (Austria) Andreas Goldberger | (United States) Alan Alborn | (Poland) Adam Małysz | |
| 42 | 6 | 8 September 2001 | (Japan) Hakuba | Olympic Ski Jumps K-120 | LH | (Austria) Stefan Horngacher | (Poland) Adam Małysz | (Austria) Andreas Goldberger | (Poland) Adam Małysz | |
| 43 | 7 | 9 September 2001 | (Japan) Hakuba | Olympic Ski Jumps K-120 | LH | (Japan) Masahiko Harada | (Austria) Martin Höllwarth | (Slovenia) Peter Žonta | (Poland) Adam Małysz | |

== Standings ==
=== Overall ===
| Rank | Ski jumper | Points |
|---|---|---|
| 1 | (Poland) Adam Małysz | 397 |
| 2 | (Austria) Andreas Goldberger | 364 |
| 3 | (Austria) Stefan Horngacher | 357 |
| 4 | (Austria) Martin Höllwarth | 333 |
| 5 | (Japan) Masahiko Harada | 237 |

- After 7 events.

=== Nations Cup ===
| Rank | Country | Points |
|---|---|---|
| 1 | Austria | 1278 |
| 2 | Japan | 711 |
| 3 | Slovenia | 683 |
| 4 | Germany | 632 |
| 5 | Poland | 586 |

- After 7 events.

== See also ==
- World Cup 2001/02
