= Kimmo Yliriesto =

Finnish ski jumper

Personal information
- Full name: Kimmo Yliriesto
- Nationality: Finland
- Born: 28 January 1983 (age 43) Rovaniemi, Finland

Sport
- Sport: Skiing

World Cup career
- Seasons: 2000–2002; 2004–2007; 2010
- Updated on 24 Apr 2015

Kimmo Yliriesto (born 28 January 1983) is a Finnish former ski jumper who competed from 2000 to 2012.

He won a bronze medal in the team competition at the 2000 Junior World Ski Championships, followed by a team gold medal in the following year's event. He made his World Cup debut on 3 December 2000, finishing 56th in Kuopio. He also did well at Continental Cup level, with many top-10 finishes and two wins. He achieved his first World Cup points with a tenth place in Hakuba on 24 January 2002. His best World Cup result was seventh in Sapporo on 5 February 2005.
