= 1998 FIS Ski Jumping Grand Prix =

Grand Prix 1998
Winners
- Overall: (Japan) Masahiko Harada

Competitions
- Venues: 5
- Individual: 6

The 1998 FIS Ski Jumping Grand Prix was the 5th Summer Grand Prix season in ski jumping on plastic. Season began on the 9 August 1998 in Stams, Austria and ended on 13 September 1998 in Hakuba, Japan.

Other competitive circuits this season included the World Cup and Continental Cup.

== Calendar ==
=== Men ===
Num	Season	Date	Place	Hill	Size	Winner	Second	Third	Yellow bib
18	1	9 August 1998	(Austria) Stams	Brunnentalschanze K105	NH	(Japan) Masahiko Harada	(Germany) Martin Schmitt	(Japan) Kazuyoshi Funaki	(Japan) Masahiko Harada
19	2	11 August 1998	(Italy) Predazzo	Trampolino dal Ben K120	LH	(Japan) Masahiko Harada	(Finland) Janne Ahonen	(France) Nicolas Dessum	(Japan) Masahiko Harada
20	3	14 August 1998	(France) Courchevel	Tremplin du Praz K120	LH	(France) Nicolas Dessum	(Finland) Janne Ahonen	(Germany) Martin Schmitt	(Japan) Masahiko Harada
21	4	16 August 1998	(Germany) Hinterzarten	Rothaus-Schanze K90	NH	(Japan) Masahiko Harada	(Finland) Janne Ahonen	(Germany) Hansjörg Jäkle (Germany) Alexander Herr	(Japan) Masahiko Harada
22	5	12 September 1998	(Japan) Hakuba	Olympic Ski Jumps K120	LH	(Japan) Kazuyoshi Funaki	(Japan) Masahiko Harada	(Germany) Martin Schmitt	(Japan) Masahiko Harada
23	6	13 Sep 1998	(Japan) Hakuba	Olympic Ski Jumps K120	LH	(Japan) Masahiko Harada	(Japan) Kazuyoshi Funaki	(Austria) R. Schwarzenberger (Germany) Martin Schmitt	(Japan) Masahiko Harada

== Standings ==
=== Overall ===
Rank	after 6 events	Points
1	(Japan) Masahiko Harada	520
2	(Japan) Kazuyoshi Funaki	350
3	(Germany) Martin Schmitt	342
4	(Finland) Janne Ahonen	290
5	(France) Nicolas Dessum	231

=== Nations Cup ===
Rank	after 6 events	Points
1	Japan	1368
2	Germany	979
3	Austria	601
4	Finland	497
5	Switzerland	300
