= Tom Aage Aarnes =

Norwegian ski jumper

Personal information
- Nationality: Norway
- Born: 25 January 1977 (age 49)

Sport
- Sport: Skiing

World Cup career
- Seasons: 1998–2000

Tom Aage Aarnes (born 25 January 1977) is a Norwegian former ski jumper.

In the World Cup he finished once among the top 30, with a 23rd place from Lillehammer in November 1998. He also competed in Zakopane in January 1998, Engelberg in January 1999 and Iron Mountain in February 2000. He represented the club Eidsvold IF and Kollenhopp.

On 23 September 2001 he tested positive for amphetamine and amphetamine metabolites. He was suspended from his sport from December 2001 to December 2003. He currently resides in Bø i Telemark, Norway.
