= Jure Radelj =

Slovenian former ski jumper (born 1977)

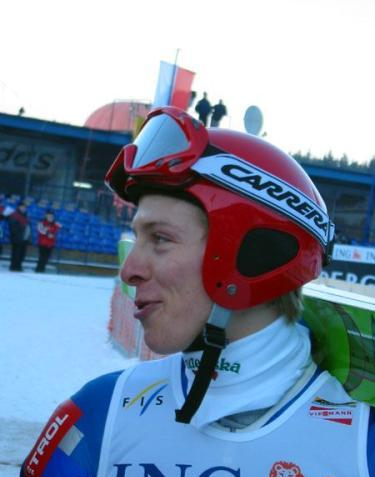
- Radelj in Zakopane, 2003

Personal information
- Full name: Jure Radelj
- Nationality: Slovenia
- Born: 26 November 1977 (age 48) Ljubljana, SR Slovenia, SFR Yugoslavia

Sport
- Sport: Skiing

World Cup career
- Seasons: 1993–2002; 2003; 2006
- Updated on 18 April 2015

Jure Radelj (born 26 November 1977) is a Slovenian former ski jumper who competed from 1993 to 2006. At World Cup level he scored three top-10 individual finishes, with the highest being sixth in Kuopio on 2 December 2000. He also scored six top-10 finishes in team competitions, with the highest being fourth in Park City on 19 January 2001.
