= Teppei Takano =

Japanese ski jumper (born 1983)

Personal information
- Born: 25 November 1983 (age 42)

Sport
- Sport: Skiing

World Cup career
- Seasons: 2001-2004
- Indiv. wins: 0

Teppei Takano (born 25 November 1983) is a Japanese ski jumper.

In the World Cup he finished once among the top 10, recording a ninth place from February 2003 in Willingen.

At the 2003 FIS Nordic World Ski Championships he finished 26th in the normal hill.
