= Ski jumping at the 2002 Winter Olympics =

Ski jumping at the XIX Olympic Winter Games
- Venue: Park City
- Dates: February 10–13, 2002
- Competitors: 73 from 22 nations

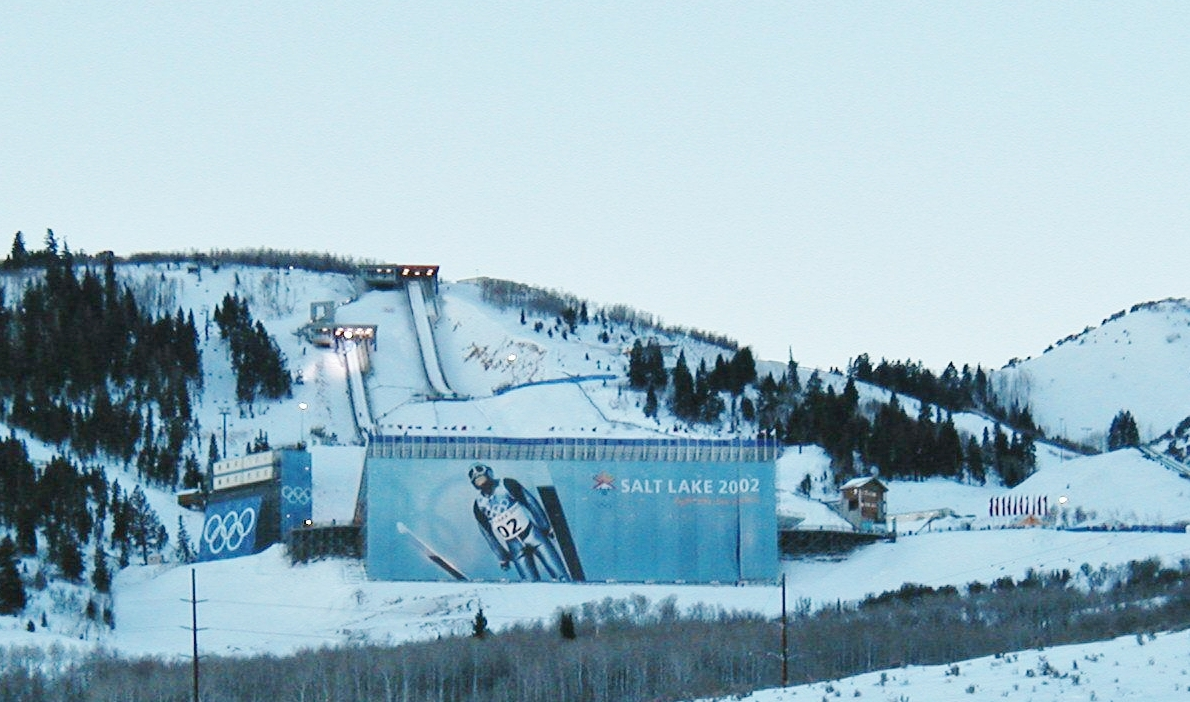
View of the ski jump from the spectator stands at the Utah Olympic Park in Park City.

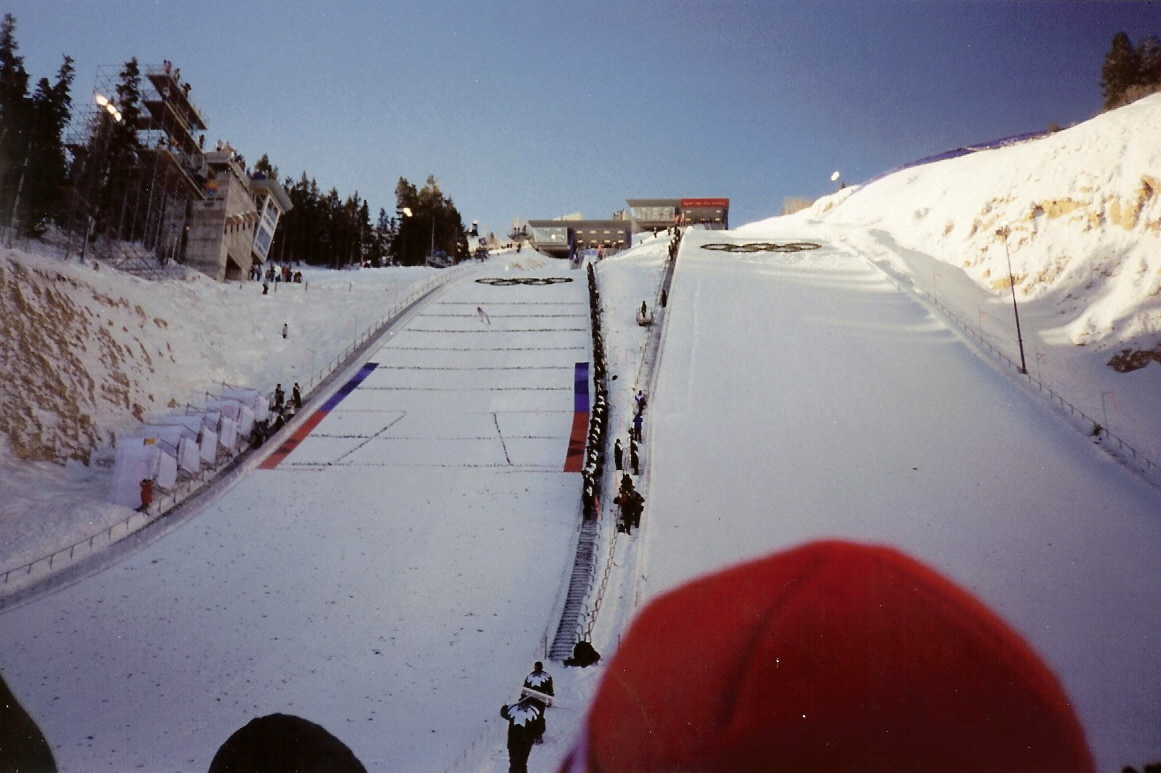
Ski jump at the Utah Olympic Park in Park City.

Ski jumping at the 2002 Winter Olympics, consisted of three events held from 10 February to 13 February, taking place at Park City.

== Medal summary ==
=== Medal table ===
Rank	Nation	Gold	Silver	Bronze	Total
1	Switzerland	2	0	0	2
2	Germany	1	1	0	2
3	Finland	0	1	1	2
3	Poland	0	1	1	2
5	Slovenia	0	0	1	1
Totals (5 entries)		3	3	3	9

Switzerland topped the medal table, with two gold medals from Simon Amman. The bronze medal won by Slovenia in the team event was the country's first in the sport.

=== Events ===
Event	Gold		Silver		Bronze	
Normal hill individual	Simon Ammann; Switzerland	269.0	Sven Hannawald; Germany	267.5	Adam Małysz; Poland	263.0
Large hill individual	Simon Ammann; Switzerland	281.4	Adam Małysz; Poland	269.7	Matti Hautamäki; Finland	256.0
Large hill team	Germany; Sven Hannawald; Stephan Hocke; Michael Uhrmann; Martin Schmitt	974.1	Finland; Matti Hautamäki; Veli-Matti Lindström; Risto Jussilainen; Janne Ahonen	974.0	Slovenia; Damjan Fras; Primož Peterka; Robert Kranjec; Peter Žonta	946.3

== Participating NOCs ==
Twenty-two nations participated in ski jumping at the Salt Lake Games. Estonia and Kyrgyzstan made their Olympic ski jumping debuts.

- Austria (5)
- Belarus (1)
- Bulgaria (1)
- Czech Republic (4)
- Estonia (3)
- Finland (5)
- France (4)
- Great Britain (1)
- Georgia (1)
- Germany (5)
- Italy (1)
- Japan (5)
- Kazakhstan (4)
- Kyrgyzstan (1)
- South Korea (4)
- Norway (4)
- Poland (5)
- Russia (5)
- Slovenia (4)
- Switzerland (4)
- Ukraine (1)
- United States (5)
