= Suicide Hill Ski Jump =

Ski jump in Negaunee, Michigan

Coordinates: 46°28′56″N 87°37′36″W

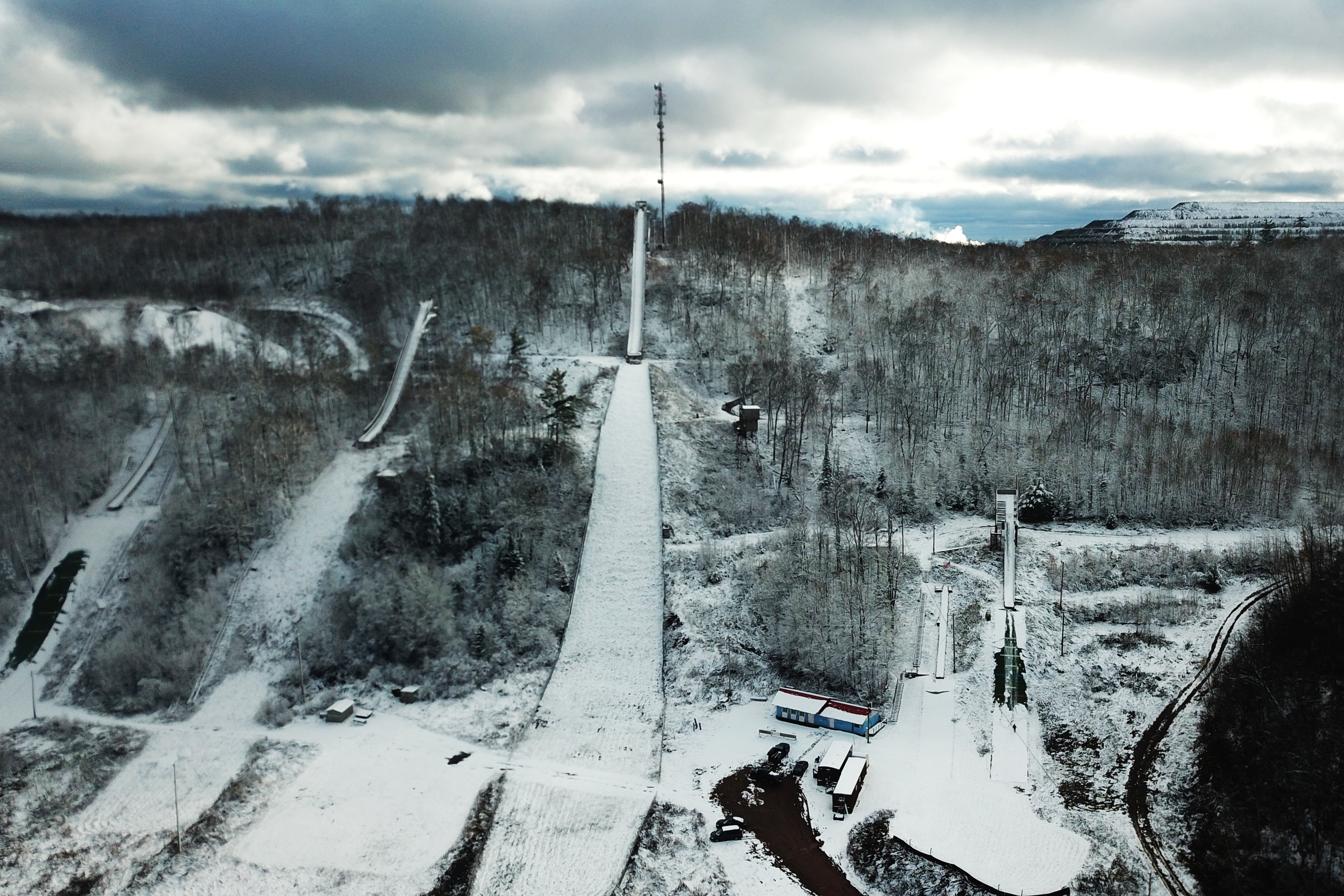
View of all jumps and training facilities

Suicide Hill Ski Jump is a 90-meter ski jump in Negaunee, Michigan. Opened in 1925, it is part of the Ishpeming Ski Club. It is one of three major ski jumps in the Upper Peninsula of Michigan, along with Copper Peak, a larger ski-flying hill, and Pine Mountain Ski Jump.

The jump is part of the U.P. Nordic Ski Complex (UPNSC), which also contains four other jumps in the so-called Suicide Bowl valley: a 13-meter, 25-meter, 40-meter, and a 60-meter jump. All five are used during winter, and the 13-, 25-, and 40-meter jumps are fitted with plastic for summer jumping.

The UPNSC also includes the Norman Juhola trail system, with more than 5 km of cross-country ski trails.

== Specifications ==
=== HS 96 ===
- Scaffold height: 140 ft
- Hill size: HS 96
- K-point: 90 meters
- Angle of take-off: 11.5 degrees
- Landing angle: 36.5 degrees
- Built: 1925

=== HS 66 ===
- Hill size: HS 66
- K-point: 60 meters
- Built: 1925

== History ==
Before the construction of the jump in 1925, numerous other hills and jumps were used for competitions. The first competition that took place in Ishpeming was on February 25, 1882. Since 1887, an annual competition has taken place in the area. On February 26, 1926, Suicide Hill was opened for competition. The name "Suicide Hill" was given by a local newspaper reporter named Ted Butler after jumper Walter "Huns" Anderson was injured in 1926. Due to this long history of ski jumping in the area, the National Ski Hall of Fame is located in Ishpeming.

== Records ==
- For the HS 96: 2003/03/02 102m Ferdinand Bader Germany
- For the HS 66: 2008/03/01 69.5m Adam Loomis United States

== List of events ==
- February 26, 1926
- February 8, 2012
- February 6, 2013
- February 5, 2014
- January 27, 2015
- January 18, 2022
- January 20, 2023
