= Primož Urh-Zupan =

Slovenian former ski jumper (born 1983)

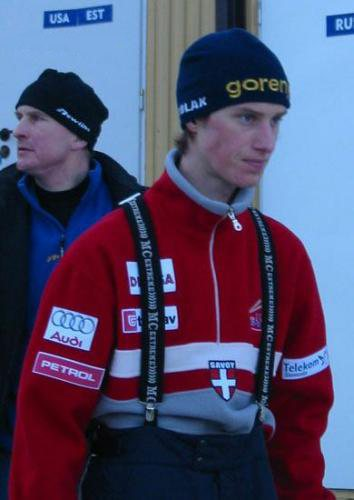
- Urh-Zupan (right) in 2003

Personal information
- Nationality: Slovenia
- Born: 22 January 1983 (age 43)

Sport
- Sport: Skiing

World Cup career
- Seasons: 1999–2003

Achievements and titles
- Personal bests: 152.5 m (500 ft); Oberstdorf, 4 Mar 2001
- Updated on 9 November 2015

Primož Urh-Zupan (born 22 January 1983) is a Slovenian former ski jumper who competed from 1999 to 2005. His best World Cup finish was seventh in a team competition in Kuopio on 25 November 2000.
