= Pekka Salminen (ski jumper) =

Finnish ski jumper

Personal information
- Full name: Pekka Salminen
- Nationality: Finland
- Born: 3 June 1981 (age 45) Joroinen, Finland

Sport
- Sport: Skiing

World Cup career
- Seasons: 1998–2005
- Team podiums: 1
- Updated on 19 May 2015

Pekka Salminen (born 3 June 1981) is a Finnish former ski jumper who competed from 1998 to 2007. His best individual World Cup finish was eighth on the normal hill in Lahti on 3 March 1999, and his best team finish was third in Sapporo on 27 January 2002.
