= Jakub Hlava =

Czech ski jumper and soldier

Jakub Hlava (born 29 December 1979 in Jilemnice) is a Czech former ski jumper and current soldier. His best World Cup result was 18th. He also achieved 15th in a FIS Summer Grand Prix competition in 2001.
