= Kazuhiro Nakamura (ski jumper) =

Japanese ski jumper (born 1980)

Personal information
- Full name: Kazuhiro Nakamura
- Born: 1 September 1980 (age 46)

Sport
- Sport: Skiing

World Cup career
- Seasons: 1997–2002
- Updated on 30 Mar 2015

Kazuhiro Nakamura (born 1 September 1980) is a Japanese former ski jumper.
