= Frank Löffler =

German former ski jumper (born 1980)

Personal information
- Full name: Frank Löffler
- Nationality: Germany
- Born: 9 August 1980 (age 45) Immenstadt, Germany

Sport
- Sport: Skiing

World Cup career
- Seasons: 1999–2001
- Team podiums: 1
- Updated on 13 May 2015

Frank Löffler (born 9 August 1980) is a German former ski jumper who competed from 1998 to 2002. At World Cup level he finished five times among the top 10, with his best individual result being seventh place in Iron Mountain on 26 February 2000, and third in the team event in Lahti on 4 March 2000. Löffler also participated in the 2001 FIS Nordic World Ski Championships, finishing 28th on the normal hill and 40th on the large hill.

He is the grandson of Sepp Weiler.
