= Igor Medved =

Slovenian former ski jumper (born 1981)

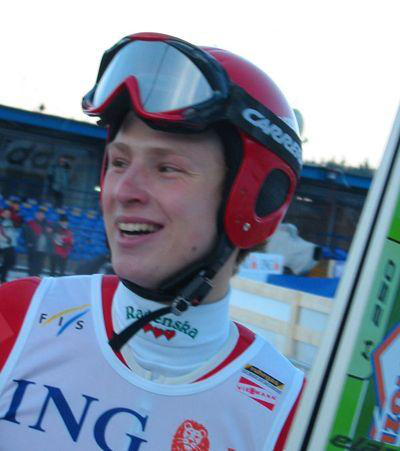
- Medved in Zakopane, 2003

Personal information
- Full name: Igor Medved
- Nationality: Slovenia
- Born: 9 March 1981 (age 45) Ljubljana, SR Slovenia, SFR Yugoslavia

Sport
- Sport: Skiing

World Cup career
- Seasons: 2001–2003
- Indiv. podiums: 1
- Team podiums: 1

Achievements and titles
- Personal bests: 206 m (676 ft); Planica, Mar 2001
- Updated on 18 April 2015

Igor Medved (born 9 March 1981) is a Slovenian former ski jumper who competed from 2001 to 2003. At World Cup level he scored three top-10 individual finishes, with the best being third in Trondheim on 9 March 2001. He also scored five top-10 finishes in team competitions, with the highest being second in Lahti on 2 March 2002.
