= Roland Audenrieth =

German ski jumper (born 1979)

Personal information
- Born: 2 July 1979 (age 47)

Sport
- Sport: Skiing
- Club: SC Partenkirchen

World Cup career
- Seasons: 1997–2001
- Indiv. podiums: 0
- Indiv. wins: 0

Roland Audenrieth (born 2 July 1979) is a German former ski jumper.

In the World Cup he finished once among the top 10, with a tenth place from Zakopane in January 1998. He won the overall Continental Cup in the 1998/99 season.
