= Risto Jussilainen =

Finnish ski jumper

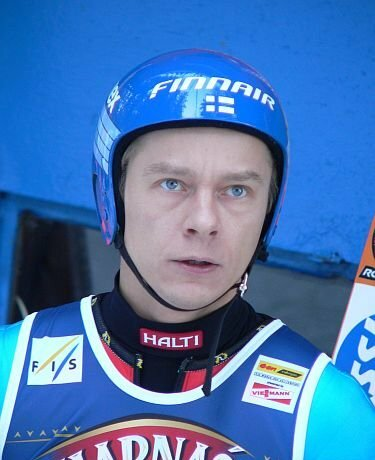
- Jussilainen in Zakopane, 2006

Personal information
- Full name: Risto Kalevi Jussilainen
- Nationality: Finland
- Born: 10 June 1975 (age 51) Jyväskylä, Finland
- Height: 1.80 m (5 ft 11 in)

Sport
- Sport: Skiing

World Cup career
- Seasons: 1993–1995; 1997; 1999–2003; 2005–2007
- Indiv. starts: 147
- Indiv. podiums: 16
- Indiv. wins: 2
- Team starts: 15
- Team podiums: 12
- Team wins: 7

Achievements and titles
- Personal bests: 224.5 m (737 ft); Planica, 20 March 2005
Medal record
Men's ski jumping
Olympic Games
Silver medal – second place	2002 Salt Lake City	Team LH
FIS Nordic World Ski Championships
Silver medal – second place	2001 Lahti	Team NH
Silver medal – second place	2001 Lahti	Team LH
Silver medal – second place	2005 Oberstdorf	Team LH
- Updated on 10 February 2016

Risto Kalevi Jussilainen (born 10 June 1975) is a Finnish former ski jumper.

== Career ==
Jussilainen's career best achievement was a silver medal in the team large hill competition at the 2002 Winter Olympics in Salt Lake City. At World Cup level he won two individual and seven team competitions (normal hill, large hill and ski flying) between 2000 and 2002. In the 2000/01 season he finished third in the overall standings. He also won silver medals in both team competitions (normal and large hills) at the 2001 World Championships.

During his career he won two World Cup competitions, an Olympic medal and three World Championship medals.

== World Cup ==
=== Standings ===
Season	Overall	4H	SF	NT	JP
1992/93	—	—	—	N/A	N/A
1993/94	84	38	—	N/A	N/A
1994/95	54	—	20	N/A	N/A
1996/97	63	—	45	—	60
1998/99	43	37	25	28	45
1999/00	8	14	28	11	8
2000/01	3rd place, bronze medalist(s)	7	3rd place, bronze medalist(s)	4	N/A
2001/02	10	8	N/A	8	N/A
2002/03	69	47	N/A	49	N/A
2004/05	12	25	N/A	23	N/A
2005/06	30	67	N/A	35	N/A
2006/07	—	—	N/A	—	N/A

=== Wins ===
No.	Season	Date	Location	Hill	Size
1	2000/01	3 March 2001	(Germany) Oberstdorf	Heini-Klopfer-Skiflugschanze K185	FH
2	2001/02	24 November 2001	(Finland) Kuopio	Puijo K120 (night)	LH
