= Jussi Hautamäki =

Finnish ski jumper

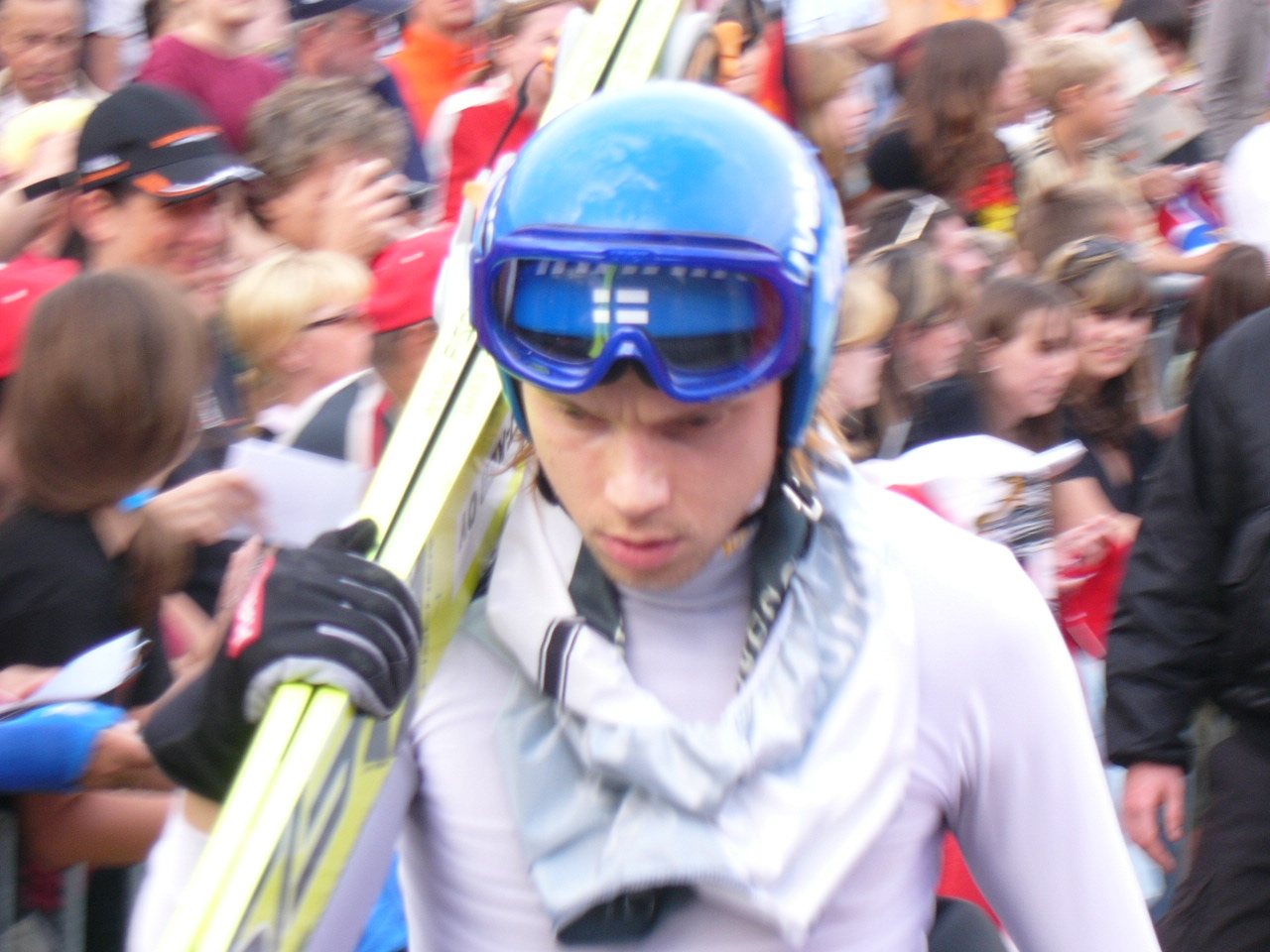
- Hautamäki in Klingenthal, 2007

Personal information
- Full name: Jussi Heikki Hautamäki
- Nationality: Finland
- Born: 20 April 1979 (age 47) Oulu, Finland

Sport
- Sport: Skiing

World Cup career
- Seasons: 1995–2009
- Indiv. podiums: 1
- Team podiums: 7
- Team wins: 3
- Updated on 18 May 2015

Jussi Hautamäki (born 20 April 1979) is a Finnish former ski jumper.

== Career ==
=== World Cup ===
Hautamäki's career began in the 1995 Alpine Skiing World Cup on 30 December 1995 in Oberstdorf, where he finished 39th. He earned his first World Cup podium place in the 2001 Alpine Skiing World Cup, after finishing third on 27 January 2001 in Sapporo.

=== Continental Cup ===
He achieved more success at Continental Cup level, managing two first-place finishes as well as four other podium finishes.

== Personal life ==
Hautamäki is married and has four children, a daughter and three sons. He is the older brother of former ski jumper Matti Hautamäki.
