= Alan Alborn =

American ski jumper

Alan Jacob Alborn
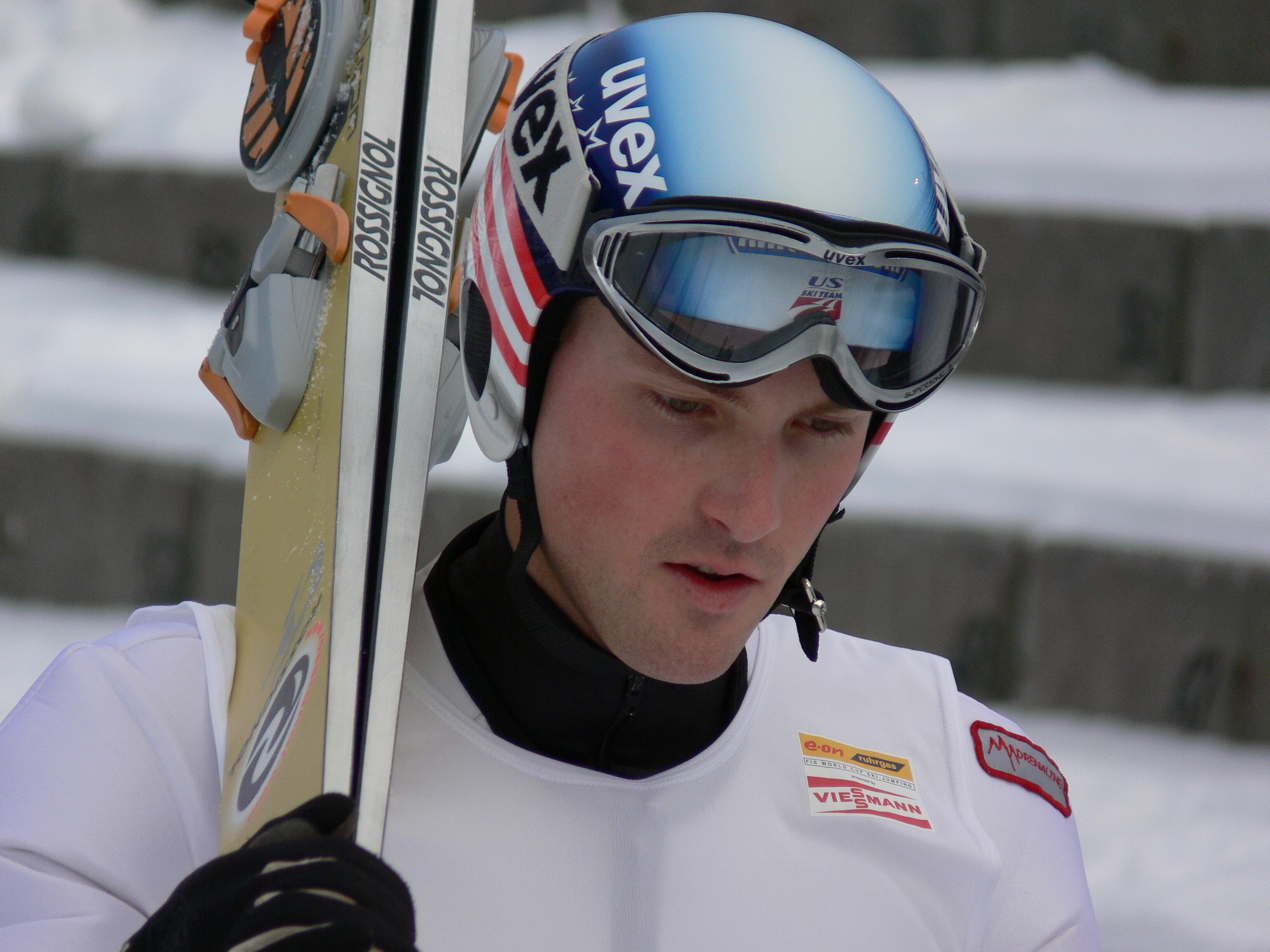
- Born: December 13, 1980 (age 45); United States
- Occupation: Ski jumper

Alan Jacob Alborn (born December 13, 1980) is an American former ski jumper. At the 2002 Winter Olympics in Salt Lake City, he finished 11th in the team large hill and 11th in the individual normal hill events.

Alborn's best finish at the FIS Nordic World Ski Championships was 23rd in the individual normal hill event at Lahti in 2001. He finished 32nd in the individual event at the 2002 Ski-flying World Championships in Harrachov.

Alborn's best individual World Cup finish was fourth in a large hill event in Switzerland in 2001. His best individual career finish was second twice in lesser events (2001, 2004).

He held the North American distance record with 221.5 meters (achieved in Planica in 2002) till it was broken by Kevin Bickner in 2017.
