= Veli-Matti Lindström =

Finnish ski jumper

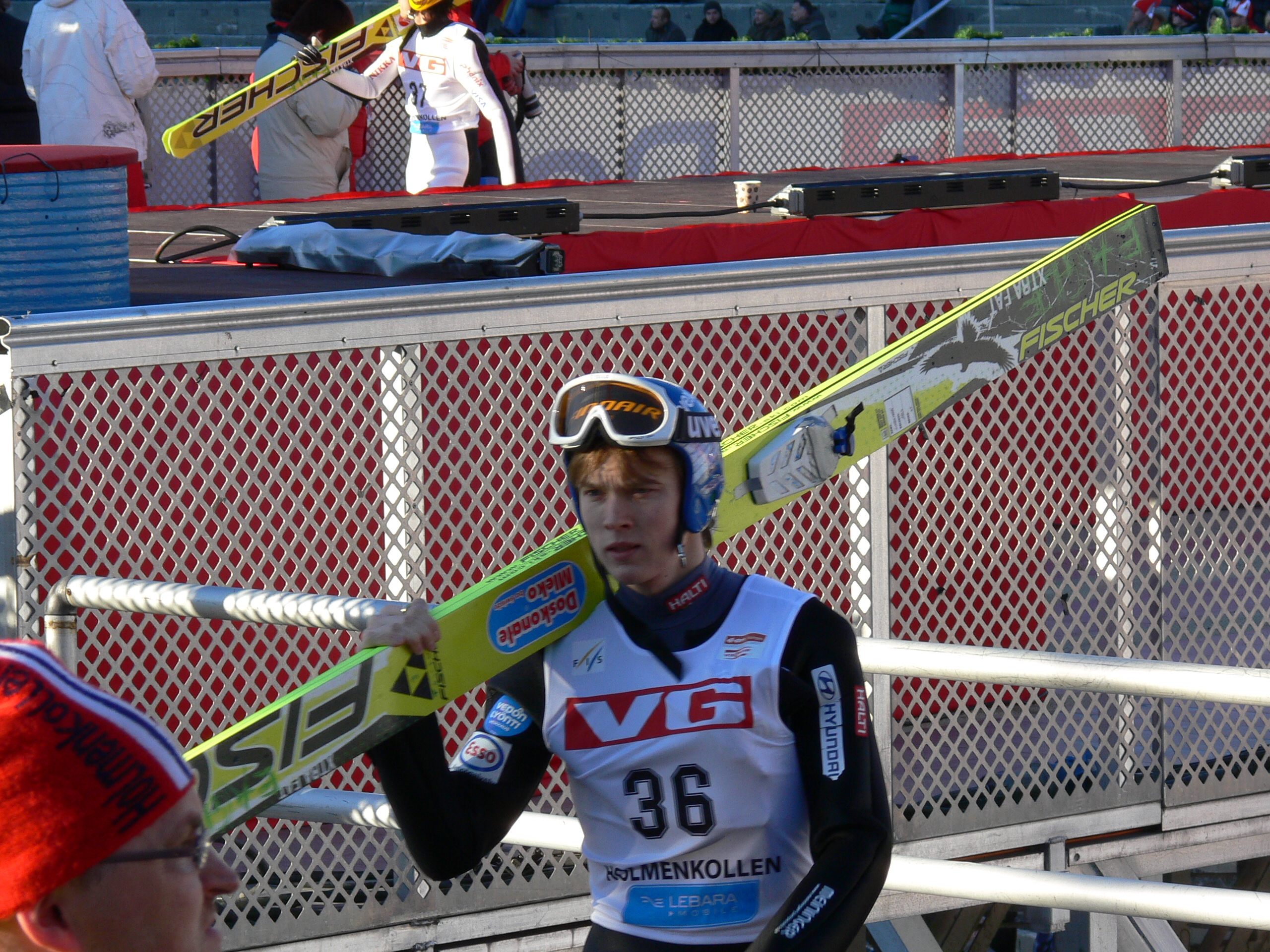
- Lindström in Oslo, 2006

Personal information
- Full name: Veli-Matti Lindström
- Nationality: Finland
- Born: 15 November 1983 (age 42) Nastola, Finland
- Height: 179 cm (5 ft 10 in)

Sport
- Sport: Skiing

World Cup career
- Seasons: 1999–2012
- Indiv. podiums: 5

Achievements and titles
- Personal bests: 225.5 m (740 ft); Planica, 21 Mar 2003
Medal record
Men's Ski jumping
Olympic Games
Silver medal – second place	2002 Salt Lake City	Team Large Hill
Men's ski flying
World Championships
Silver medal – second place	2004 Planica	Team
- Updated on 18 May 2015

Veli-Matti Lindström (born 15 November 1983) is a Finnish former ski jumper. His career best achievement was a silver medal at the 2002 Winter Olympics in Salt Lake City in the team large hill event. He also won a silver medal in the team event at the 2004 Ski Flying World Championships in Planica, as well as two championships at the Ski Flying World Cup in Planica in the team event in 2002 and 2003.

On 21 March 2003 in Planica, Lindström became the first ski jumper in history to surpass the 230 metre mark, with a jump of 232.5 m. However, his jump was rendered an invalid world record due to him touching the snow with his hand.

== Invalid ski jumping world record ==
Date	Hill	Location	Metres	Feet
21 March 2003	Velikanka bratov Gorišek K185	Planica, Slovenia	232.5	763

Not recognized! Ground touch at world record distance.
