= 2002–03 FIS Ski Jumping Continental Cup =

Ski-jumping competition series

FIS Continental Cup 2002/03
Winners
- Summer: (Germany) Stefan Pieper
- Winter: (Austria) Stefan Thurnbichler

Competitions
- Venues: 6 (Summer), 20 (Winter)
- Individual: 10 (Summer), 35 (Winter)
- Team: 1 (Summer)
- Cancelled: 1 (Summer), 8 (Winter)
- Rescheduled: 3 (Winter)

The 2002/03 FIS Ski Jumping Continental Cup was the 12th in a row (10th official) Continental Cup winter season in ski jumping for men. Europa Cup was a predecessor of Continental Cup.

For the first they introduced the separated cup and ranking in summer ski jumping season. So far (from 1996 till 2001) summer ski jumping season was incorporated and joined with winter season, with all summer and winter jumps together, all points counting as one complete season.

Other competitive circuits this season included the World Cup and Grand Prix.

== Men's Summer ==
Individual summer events in the CC history

Total	F	L	N	Winners
10	—	2	8	7

after large hill event in Park City (29 September 2002)

=== Calendar ===
All	No.	Date	Place (Hill)	Size	Winner	Second	Third	R.
1	1	5 July 2002	(Slovenia) Velenje (Grajski grič K85)	N _{001}	(Slovenia) Robert Kranjec	(Slovenia) Primož Peterka	(Slovenia) Damjan Fras	
2	2	6 July 2002	(Slovenia) Velenje (Grajski grič K85)	N _{002}	(Slovenia) Robert Kranjec	(Slovenia) Primož Peterka	(Slovenia) Damjan Fras	
3	3	3 August 2002	(Germany) Oberstdorf (Schattenbergschanze K90)	N _{003}	(Germany) Frank Löffler	(Germany) Stefan Pieper	(Austria) Stefan Thurnbichler	
4	4	24 August 2002	(Norway) Rælingen (Marikollen K88)	N _{004}	(Germany) Kai Bracht	(Austria) Andreas Kofler	(Finland) Arttu Lappi	
5	5	25 August 2002	(Norway) Rælingen (Marikollen K88)	N _{005}	(Austria) R. Schwarzenberger	(Germany) Stefan Pieper	(Finland) Jussi Hautamäki	
6	6	31 August 2002	(Sweden) Falun (Lugnet K90)	N _{006}	(Austria) Andreas Kofler	(Finland) Kalle Keituri	(Austria) R. Schwarzenberger	
		1 September 2002	(Sweden) Falun (Lugnet K90)	N _{cnx}	cancelled			
7	7	21 September 2002	(Canada) Calgary (Alberta Ski Jump K89)	N _{007}	(Germany) Kai Bracht	(Sweden) Isak Grimholm	(South Korea) Kang Chil-ku	
8	8	22 September 2002	(Canada) Calgary (Alberta Ski Jump K89)	N _{008}	(South Korea) Choi Heung-chul	(Slovenia) Rok Benkovič	(Canada) Gregory Baxter	
9	9	28 September 2002	(United States) Park City (Utah Olympic Park K120)	L _{001}	(United States) Clint Jones	(Switzerland) Simon Ammann	(Slovenia) Rok Benkovič	
10	10	29 September 2002	(United States) Park City (Utah Olympic Park K120)	L _{002}	(United States) Clint Jones	(United States) Johnny Spillane	(Switzerland) Simon Ammann	
1st FIS Summer Continental Cup Overall (5 July – 29 September 2002)					(Germany) Stefan Pieper	(Germany) Kai Bracht	(Slovenia) Rok Benkovič	

==== Overall ====
Rank	after 10 events	Points
1	(Germany) Stefan Pieper	421
2	(Germany) Kai Bracht	405
3	(Slovenia) Rok Benkovič	362
4	(Austria) Andreas Kofler	320
5	(Austria) Reinhard Schwarzenberger	262
6	(Slovenia) Blaž Vrhovnik	259
7	(Slovenia) Jure Radelj	231
8	(Sweden) Isak Grimholm	216
9	(United States) Clint Jones	200
	(Slovenia) Robert Kranjec	200

== Men's Winter ==
Individual men's events in the CC history

Total	F	L	N	Winners
473	2	178	293	196

after normal hill event in Stryn (16 March 2003)

=== Calendar ===
All	No.	Date	Place (Hill)	Size	Winner	Second	Third	R.
		7 December 2002	(Germany) Oberwiesenthal (Fichtelbergschanzen K90)	N _{cnx}	cancelled due to lack of snow			
		8 December 2002	(Germany) Oberwiesenthal (Fichtelbergschanzen K90)	N _{cnx}	cancelled due to lack of snow			
439	1	14 December 2002	(Finland) Lahti (Salpausselkä K116)	L _{163}	(Austria) Mathias Hafele	(Austria) Thomas Morgenstern	(Norway) Lars Bystøl (Norway) Anders Bardal	
440	2	15 December 2002	(Finland) Lahti (Salpausselkä K116)	L _{164}	(Austria) Thomas Morgenstern	(Austria) Mathias Hafele	(Austria) Christian Nagiller	
441	3	21 December 2002	(Czechoslovakia) Liberec (Ještěd A K120)	L _{165}	(Austria) Thomas Morgenstern	(Norway) Lars Bystøl	(Czech Republic) Jakub Janda	
442	4	22 December 2002	(Czechoslovakia) Liberec (Ještěd A K120)	L _{166}	(Austria) Thomas Morgenstern	(Czech Republic) Jakub Janda	(Norway) Anders Bardal	
443	5	26 December 2002	(Switzerland) St. Moritz (Olympiaschanze K95)	N _{275}	(Austria) Bastian Kaltenböck	(Austria) Stefan Thurnbichler	(Austria) Stefan Kaiser	
444	6	28 December 2002	(Switzerland) Engelberg (Gross-Titlis-Schanze K120)	L _{167}	(Austria) Stefan Thurnbichler	(Austria) Christian Nagiller	(France) Emmanuel Chedal	
445	7	1 January 2003	(Austria) Seefeld (Toni-Seelos-Olympiaschanze K90)	N _{276}	(Austria) Christian Nagiller	(Austria) R. Schwarzenberger	(Austria) Wolfgang Loitzl	
446	8	4 January 2003	(Austria) Bischofshofen (Paul-Ausserleitner-Schanze K120)	L _{168}	(Finland) Jussi Hautamäki	(Finland) Risto Jussilainen (Germany) Michael Neumayer		
		10 January 2003	(Italy) Tarvisio (Gross-Titlis-Schanze K90)	N _{cnx}	canceled			
447	9	10 January 2003	(Japan) Sapporo (Miyanomori K90) (Ōkurayama K120)	N _{277}	(Norway) Morten Solem	(Germany) Ferdinand Bader	(Japan) Shingo Ueno	
448	10	11 January 2003	(Japan) Sapporo (Miyanomori K90) (Ōkurayama K120)	L _{169}	(Japan) Hideharu Miyahira	(Finland) Pekka Salminen	(Japan) Akira Higashi	
449	11	11 January 2003	(Slovenia) Planica (Srednja Bloudkova K90)	N _{278}	(Austria) Christian Nagiller	(Germany) Kai Bracht	(Austria) Stefan Thurnbichler (Slovenia) Jure Bogataj	
450	12	12 January 2003	(Japan) Sapporo (Ōkurayama K120)	L _{170}	(Japan) Hideharu Miyahira	(Finland) Pekka Salminen	(Japan) Noriaki Kasai	
451	13	12 January 2003	(Slovenia) Planica (Srednja Bloudkova K90	N _{279}	(Austria) Christian Nagiller	(Austria) Stefan Thurnbichler (Finland) Janne Happonen		
		14 January 2003	(Austria) Ramsau (W90-Mattensprunganlage K90)	N _{cnx}	cancelled			
		15 January 2003	(Austria) Ramsau (W90-Mattensprunganlage K90)	N _{cnx}	cancelled			
		25 January 2003	(Germany) Schönwald (Adlerschanzen Schönwald K85)	N _{091}	cancelled and replaced in Titisee-Neustadt on the same day			
452	14	(Note: Cancelled event in Schönwald (25 January) was replaced in Titisee-Neustadt on the same date.)25 January 2003	(Germany) Titisee-Neustadt (Hochfirstschanze K120)	L _{171}	(Germany) Christof Duffner	(Norway) Daniel Forfang	(Germany) Kai Bracht	
453	15	26 January 2003	(Germany) Titisee-Neustadt (Hochfirstschanze K120)	L _{172}	(Poland) Robert Mateja	(Slovenia) Igor Medved	(Norway) Daniel Forfang	
31st Schwarzwald Tournament Overall (25 – 26 January 2003)					(Poland) Robert Mateja	(Norway) Daniel Forfang	(Slovenia) Igor Medved	
454	16	1 February 2003	(Germany) Braunlage (Wurmbergschanze K90)	N _{280}	(Germany) Michael Möllinger	(Norway) Morten Solem	(Austria) Balthasar Schneider	
455	17	2 February 2003	(Germany) Braunlage (Wurmbergschanze K90)	N _{281}	(Norway) Morten Solem	(Slovenia) Bine Zupan	(Austria) Stefan Thurnbichler	
456	18	5 February 2003	(Germany) Willingen (Mühlenkopfschanze K120)	L _{173}	(Germany) Michael Möllinger	(Austria) Stefan Thurnbichler	(Germany) Maximilian Mechler	
457	19	8 February 2003	(Poland) Zakopane (Wielka Krokiew K120)	L _{174}	(Norway) Daniel Forfang	(Slovenia) Jure Radelj	(Poland) Robert Mateja	
458	20	9 February 2003	(Poland) Zakopane (Wielka Krokiew K120)	L _{175}	(Norway) Daniel Forfang	(Austria) Stefan Thurnbichler	(Poland) Robert Mateja	
459	21	15 February 2003	(Austria) Eisenerz (Erzbergschanzen K90)	N _{282}	(Austria) R. Schwarzenberger	(Austria) Mathias Hafele	(Germany) Frank Ludwig	
		15 February 2003	(United States) Westby (Snowflake K106) (Note: Not clear if Snowflake hill in Westby had K-point at K106 or K113 at that time.)	L _{cnx}	cancelled			
460	22	16 February 2003	(Austria) Eisenerz (Erzbergschanzen K90)	N _{283}	(Austria) Stefan Thurnbichler	(Germany) Frank Ludwig	(Slovenia) Jure Radelj	
461	23	16 February 2003	(United States) Westby (Snowflake K106)	L _{176}	(Germany) Ferdinand Bader	(Austria) Bernhard Metzler	(Austria) Markus Eigentler	
462	24	21 February 2003	(Germany) Brotterode (Inselbergschanze K98)	N _{284}	(Finland) Janne Happonen	(Austria) Stefan Thurnbichler	(Germany) Michael Neumayer	
463	25	22 February 2003	(Germany) Brotterode (Inselbergschanze K98)	N _{285}	(Finland) Janne Happonen	(Germany) Jörg Ritzerfeld	(Norway) Daniel Forfang	
		22 February 2003	(United States) Iron Mountain (Pine Mountain Ski Jump K120)	L _{cnx}	cancelled and one of them replaced in Ishpeming on 28 February			
		23 February 2003	(United States) Iron Mountain (Pine Mountain Ski Jump K120)	L _{cnx}	cancelled and one of them replaced in Ishpeming on 28 February			
464	26	23 February 2003	(Germany) Lauscha (Marktiegelschanze K92)	N _{286}	(Austria) R. Schwarzenberger	(Germany) Michael Neumayer	(Norway) Daniel Forfang (Norway) Morten Solem (Finland) Janne Happonen	
465	27	(Note: One of the cancelled events in Iron Mountain (22 or 23 February) was replaced in Ishpeming on 28 February.)28 February 2003	(United States) Ishpeming (Suicide Hill K90)	N _{287}	(Germany) Kai Bracht	(Germany) Ferdinand Bader	(Finland) Lauri Hakola	
466	28	1 March 2003	(Germany) Ruhpolding (Große Zirmbergschanze K115)	L _{177}	(Austria) Stefan Thurnbichler	(Germany) Michael Neumayer	(Austria) Bastian Kaltenböck	
467	29	1 March 2003	(United States) Ishpeming (Suicide Hill K90)	N _{288}	(Germany) Roland Audenrieth	(Germany) Kai Bracht	(Germany) Ferdinand Bader	
468	30	(Note: Competition in Ishpeming (2 March) had only one round.)2 March 2003	(Germany) Ruhpolding (Große Zirmbergschanze K115)	L _{178}	(Austria) Stefan Thurnbichler	(Austria) R. Schwarzenberger	(Norway) Morten Solem	
469	31	2 March 2003	(United States) Ishpeming (Suicide Hill K90)	N _{289}	(Germany) Ferdinand Bader	(Finland) Juha-Matti Ruuskanen	(Finland) Lauri Hakola	
		8 March 2003	(Finland) Kuusamo (Rukatunturi K120)	L _{cnx}	cancelled			
		9 March 2003	(Finland) Kuusamo (Rukatunturi K120)	L _{cnx}	cancelled			
470	32	12 March 2003	(Japan) Zaō (Yamagata K90)	N _{290}	(Japan) Akira Higashi	(Norway) Thomas Lobben	(Japan) Takanobu Okabe	
471	33	13 March 2003	(Japan) Zaō (Yamagata K90)	N _{291}	(Japan) Yūsuke Kaneko	(United States) Jim Denney	(Japan) Hiroki Yamada	
472	34	15 March 2003	(Norway) Stryn (Bjørkelibakken K90)	N _{292}	(Norway) Morten Solem	(Germany) Michael Möllinger	(Austria) Markus Eigentler	
473	35	16 March 2003	(Norway) Stryn (Bjørkelibakken K90)	N _{293}	(Norway) Morten Solem	(Germany) Ferdinand Bader	(Germany) Michael Möllinger	
12th FIS Winter Continental Cup Overall (14 December 2002 – 16 March 2003)					(Austria) Stefan Thurnbichler	(Norway) Morten Solem	(Germany) Michael Möllinger	

==== Overall ====
Rank	after 35 events	Points
1	(Austria) Stefan Thurnbichler	1252
2	(Norway) Morten Solem	958
3	(Germany) Michael Möllinger	829
4	(Germany) Ferdinand Bader	813
5	(Norway) Daniel Forfang	804
6	(Austria) Bastian Kaltenböck	747
7	(Germany) Kai Bracht	621
8	(Austria) Bernhard Metzler	605
9	(Austria) Christian Nagiller	593
10	(Austria) Wolfgang Loitzl	523

== Team events ==
Team events in the CC history

Total	N	Winners	Competition
3	3	2	Men's summer team

after men's NH summer event in Oberstdorf (4 August 2002)

=== Calendar ===
All	No.	Date	Place (Hill)	Size	Winner	Second	Third	R.|
Men's summer team
1	1	4 August 2002	(Germany) Oberstdorf (Schattenbergschanze K90)	N _{001}	Germany Stefan Pieper; Frank Ludwig; Michael Möllinger; Frank Löffler	Austria Stefan Thurnbichler; Andreas Kofler; Christian Nagiller; Reinhard Schwarzenberger	Poland Łukasz Kruczek; Tomisław Tajner; Wojciech Skupień; Marcin Bachleda	

== Europa Cup vs. Continental Cup ==
- Last two Europa Cup seasons (1991/92 and 1992/93) are recognized as first two Continental Cup seasons by International Ski Federation (FIS), although Continental Cup under this name officially started first season in 1993/94 season.

== See also ==
- 2002–03 FIS World Cup
- 2002 FIS Grand Prix
