= 2002–03 Four Hills Tournament =

Ski jumping competition

Four Hills Tournament at the 2002-03 FIS Ski Jumping World Cup
- Venues: Schattenbergschanze, Große Olympiaschanze, Bergiselschanze, Paul-Ausserleitner-Schanze
- Location: Germany, Austria
- Dates: 28 December 2002 – 6 January 2003
- Competitors: 110 from 20 nations

Medalists
gold medal	(Finland) Janne Ahonen
silver medal	(Germany) Sven Hannawald
bronze medal	(Poland) Adam Małysz

The 51st edition of the annual Four Hills Tournament was held in the traditional venues: Oberstorf and Garmisch-Partenkirchen in Germany, and Innsbruck and Bischofshofen in Austria. The defending champion was Sven Hannawald. After being the first ski jumper to win on all four hills in the previous year, he also won the first event of 2003-04. This fifth consecutive victory at a Four Hills tournament equalized a record set by Helmut Recknagel in the late 1950s. Kamil Stoch achieved the same feat in 2018.

The tournament victor was Janne Ahonen, who had already won the tournament four years prior. Ahonen would continue to win it three more times, becoming the most successful athlete of the Four Hills tournament.

== Format ==
At each of the four events, a qualification round was held. The 50 best jumpers qualified for the competition. The fifteen athletes leading the World Cup at the time qualified automatically. In case of an omitted qualification or a result that would normally result in elimination, they would instead qualify as 50th.

Unlike the procedure at normal World Cup events, the 50 qualified athletes were paired up for the first round of the final event, with the winner proceeding to the second round. The rounds start with the duel between #26 and #25 from the qualification round, followed by #27 vs #24, up to #50 vs #1. The five best duel losers, so-called 'Lucky Losers' also proceed.

For the tournament ranking, the total points earned from each jump are added together. The World Cup points collected during the four events are disregarded in this ranking.

== Pre-Tournament World Cup Standings ==
At the time of the tournament, eight out of twenty-eight events were already held.

The standings were as follows:

Rank	Name	Points
1.	(Austria) Martin Höllwarth	469
2.	(Finland) Janne Ahonen	427
3.	(Austria) Andreas Widhölzl	405
4.	(Norway) Sigurd Pettersen	396
5.	(Poland) Adam Małysz	381
6.	(Germany) Michael Uhrmann	320
7.	(Austria) Andreas Goldberger	279
8.	(Slovenia) Primož Peterka	278
9.	(Germany) Sven Hannawald	224
10.	(Austria) Andreas Kofler	220
10.	(Slovenia) Peter Žonta	220

== Participating nations and athletes ==
The number of jumpers a nation was allowed to nominate was dependent on previous results. At each event, a 'national group' of ten jumpers from the host country was added.

The defending champion was Sven Hannawald. Six other competitors had also previously won the Four Hills tournament: Andreas Goldberger in 1992-93 and 1994–95, Primož Peterka in 1996-97, Kazuyoshi Funaki in 1997-98, Janne Ahonen in 1998-99, Andreas Widhölzl in 1999-00 and Adam Małysz in 2000-01.

The following athletes were nominated:

Nation	Starting Spots	Number of Athletes	Athletes
Germany	8+10	19	Michael Uhrmann, Sven Hannawald, Georg Spaeth, Martin Schmitt, Christof Duffner, Stefan Pieper, Maximilian Mechler, Michael Neumayer (not in Innsbruck), Stephan Hocke (until Innsbruck); National Group: Alexander Herr, Jörg Ritzerfeld, Kai Bracht, Michael Möllinger, Dirk Else, Ferdinand Bader, Frank Ludwig, Daniel Klausmann, Frank Reichel (Oberstdorf only), Roland Audenrieth (Garmisch-Partenkirchen only)
Austria	8 + 10	20	Martin Höllwarth, Andreas Widhölzl, Andreas Goldberger, Andreas Kofler, Florian Liegl, Mathias Hafele, Thomas Morgenstern, Martin Koch (until Innsbruck); National Group: Reinhard Schwarzenberger, Wolfgang Loitzl, Stefan Thurnbichler, Christian Nagiller, Bastian Kaltenböck, Balthasar Schneider, Bernhard Metzler, Stefan Kaiser, Manuel Fettner, Markus Eigentler (Innsbruck only), Stefan Becker (Bischofshofen only), Michael Nagiller (Bischofshofen only)
Bulgaria	1	1	Georgi Zharkov
Czech Republic	3	4	Jakub Janda, Jan Matura, Lukáš Hlava (until Garmisch-Partenkirchen), Jiří Parma (Innsbruck onward)
Estonia	3	3	Jens Salumäe, Jaan Jüris (not Innsbruck), Jouko Hein (Garmisch-Partenkirchen only)
Finland	8	8	Janne Ahonen, Arttu Lappi, Matti Hautamäki, Tami Kiuru, Akseli Kokkonen, Veli-Matti Lindström, Jussi Hautamäki, Risto Jussilainen
France	3	3	Nicolas Dessum (Innsbruck onward, Emmanuel Chedal (Innsbruck onward, Maxime Remy (Innsbruck only)
Italy	3	3	Roberto Cecon, Alessio Bolgnani, Giancarlo Adami
Japan	5	5	Noriaki Kasai, Kazuyoshi Funaki, Hideharu Miyahira, Hiroki Yamada, Kazuya Yoshioka
Kazakhstan	3	3	Pawel Gaiduk, Stanislav Filimonov, Maxim Polunin
Netherlands	2	2	Ingemar Mayr, Christoph Kreuzer (Innsbruck onward)
Norway	8	8	Sigurd Pettersen, Roar Ljøkelsøy, Bjørn Einar Romøren, Kim-Roar Hansen, Henning Stensrud, Lars Bystøl, Tommy Ingebrigtsen, Anders Bardal
Poland	4	5	Adam Małysz, Marcin Bachleda, Tomasz Pochwała, Tomisław Tajner (until Garmisch-Partenkirchen), Robert Mateja (Bischofshofen only)
Russia	4	5	Valery Kobelev, Ildar Fatchullin, Ilya Rosliakov, Alexei Silaev (until Innsbruck), Dmitri Vassiliev (Bischofshofen only)
Slovakia	2	2	Martin Mesík, Dušan Oršula
Slovenia	6	6	Primož Peterka, Peter Žonta, Damjan Fras, Robert Kranjec, Igor Medved, Rok Benkovič (Innsbruck onward)
South Korea	4	4	Kim Hyun-ki, Kang Chil-ku, Choi Yong-jik (until Innsbruck), Choi Heung-chul (until Innsbruck)
Sweden	2	2	Kristoffer Jåfs, Isak Grimholm
Switzerland	4	4	Simon Ammann, Andreas Küttel, Marco Steinauer (until Innsbruck), Sylvain Freiholz (Garmisch-Partenkirchen and Innsbruck)
United States	3	3	Alan Alborn, Clint Jones (until Garmisch-Partenkirchen), Tommy Schwall (until Garmisch-Partenkirchen)

== Results ==
=== Oberstorf ===
(Germany) Schattenbergschanze, Oberstorf
28-29 December 2002

Qualification winner: (Norway) Roar Ljøkelsøy

Rank	Name	Points
1	(Germany) Sven Hannawald	263.1
2	(Austria) Martin Höllwarth	257.7
3	(Finland) Janne Ahonen	257.5
4	(Germany) Martin Schmitt	252.5
5	(Austria) Andreas Kofler	245.1
6	(Norway) Roar Ljøkelsøy	243.6
7	(Slovenia) Primož Peterka	239.7
8	(Slovenia) Peter Žonta	239.0
9	(Austria) Thomas Morgenstern	237.4
10	(Austria) Florian Liegl	236.8

=== Garmisch-Partenkirchen ===
(Germany) Große Olympiaschanze, Garmisch-Partenkirchen
31 December 2002 - 1 January 2003

The second event saw three former tournament winners on the podium, two of which have not even placed in the Top Ten in Oberstorf. The first event's winner Sven Hannawald on the other hand, only placed 12th (235.1p).

Qualification winner: (Austria) Thomas Morgenstern

Rank	Name	Points
1	(Slovenia) Primož Peterka	264.6
2	(Austria) Andreas Goldberger	261.1
2	(Poland) Adam Małysz	261.1
4	(Norway) Roar Ljøkelsøy	256.1
5	(Finland) Janne Ahonen	255.6
6	(Switzerland) Simon Ammann	247.9
7	(Japan) Hideharu Miyahira	245.9
8	(Austria) Andreas Kofler	245.5
9	(Austria) Andreas Widhölzl	239.8
10	(Austria) Martin Höllwarth	236.9

=== Innsbruck ===
(Austria) Bergiselschanze, Innsbruck
03-4 January 2003

The jumbled results of the first two events saw Janne Ahonen in the lead after the tournament's first half. With a clear victory in Innsbruck, the Finn increased his lead in the overall ranking to 26.7 points.

Again, the winner of the previous event could not be found in the Top Ten. Peterka placed 15th (198.1p).

Qualification winner: (Austria) Stefan Thurnbichler

Rank	Name	Points
1	(Finland) Janne Ahonen	227.5
2	(Austria) Florian Liegl	218.7
3	(Austria) Martin Höllwarth	216.6
4	(Germany) Sven Hannawald	215.7
5	(Austria) Andreas Widhölzl	214.4
6	(Poland) Adam Małysz	211.9
7	(Norway) Roar Ljøkelsøy	210.6
8	(Austria) Andreas Goldberger	208.4
9	(Germany) Martin Schmitt	206.9
10	(Austria) Andreas Kofler	204.6

=== Bischofshofen ===
(Austria) Paul-Ausserleitner-Schanze, Bischofshofen
6 January 2003

Due to bad weather, the qualification was postponed to January 6, and instead of Sudden Death match-ups in the first round, the usual World Cup format was used.

The surprise winner was 21-year-old Bjørn Einar Romøren, whose best position during the tournament so far had been a 15th place in Garmisch-Partenkirchen. It was his first World Cup victory.

Janne Ahonen performed two solid jumps and his comfortable lead in the overall ranking was not in danger.

Qualification winner: (Austria) Thomas Morgenstern

Rank	Name	Points
1	(Norway) Bjørn Einar Romøren	263.1
2	(Germany) Sven Hannawald	262.4
2	(Austria) Andreas Kofler	262.4
4	(Finland) Janne Ahonen	259.3
5	(Norway) Sigurd Pettersen	257.0
6	(Austria) Thomas Morgenstern	255.5
7	(Poland) Adam Małysz	253.0
8	(Slovenia) Primož Peterka	252.3
9	(Austria) Florian Liegl	250.5
10	(Italy) Roberto Cecon	248.1

== Final ranking ==
Rank	Name	Oberstorf	Garmisch-Partenkirchen	Innsbruck	Bischofshofen	Points
1	(Finland) Janne Ahonen	3rd	5th	1st	4th	999.9
2	(Germany) Sven Hannawald	1st	12th	4th	2nd	976.3
3	(Poland) Adam Małysz	13th	2nd	6th	7th	959.7
4	(Austria) Andreas Kofler	5th	8th	10th	2nd	957.6
5	(Slovenia) Primož Peterka	7th	1st	15th	8th	954.7
6	(Norway) Roar Ljøkelsøy	6th	4th	7th	15th	949.3
7	(Austria) Martin Höllwarth	2nd	10th	3rd	16th	945.6
8	(Austria) Florian Liegl	10th	17th	2nd	9th	934.2
9	(Austria) Andreas Goldberger	14th	2nd	8th	22nd	923.0
10	(Austria) Thomas Morgenstern	9th	25th	12th	6th	912.8

The winner of Bischofshofen, Bjørn Einar Romøren, had failed to proceed to the second round of Oberstorf and only placed 19th overall (801.4p).
