= Dušan Oršula =

Slovak ski jumper

Personal information
- Nationality: Slovakia
- Born: 23 August 1979 (age 47)

Sport
- Sport: Skiing
- Club: LKS Dukla Banská Bystrica

World Cup career
- Seasons: 1993–2003
- Indiv. wins: 7 February 1999 in Harrachov – 37th place (solo debut)
- Team wins: 30 January 1999 in Willingen – 11th place (team debut)

Achievements and titles
- Personal bests: 126 m (413 ft); Harrachov, 2002

Dušan Oršula (born 23 August 1979) is a Slovak retired ski jumper who represented his country internationally from 1993 to 2003. He participated in the 2002 Ski Flying World Championships and the 2003 FIS Nordic World Ski Championships. He is a seven-time medalist in the Slovak National Ski Jumping Championships between 1999 and 2003 and represented the LKS Dukla Banská Bystrica club.

During his career, he mainly competed in Continental Cup events, where he scored points in the overall standings for four seasons (1998–2002). His best result in this competition came on 20 February 1999 in Westby, where he placed 7th.

In January 1996, he participated in the qualifying round of a World Cup event for the first time in Zakopane, though he did not qualify. His World Cup debut in the main competition took place on 30 January 1999 in Willingen, where he finished 11th in the team event. In individual competition, he first appeared in the main event on 7 February 1999 in Harrachov, where he finished 37th, which remained his best result in the World Cup. He competed in the main competition twice more: on 12 January 2002 in Willingen, where he placed 43rd, and on 8 February 2003, also in Willingen, where he finished one place lower.

In March 2002, he competed at the Ski Flying World Championships in Harrachov, where his participation ended after the first round of competition. He finished 47th with a jump of 104 meters.

In February 2003, he took part in the qualifications for both individual events at the Nordic World Ski Championships in Fiemme Valley. However, in both qualifying rounds, he finished in a distant 54th place and did not advance to the main competition.

== Career overview ==
=== 1993–94 season ===
In 1993, Dušan Oršula participated in the unofficial summer championship for children under 15 in Garmisch-Partenkirchen. He finished 14th in the individual competition and 5th in the team event. In January 1994, he made his debut in the Continental Cup on the ski jump in Gallio, where he finished 39th out of 41 competitors, beating Federico Rigoni and Martin Mesík. At the end of January, he competed in the FIS Nordic Junior World Ski Championships in Breitenwang, where he placed 70th in the individual event and 14th in the team competition. Throughout the rest of the 1993–94 season, Oršula competed in six more Continental Cup events but did not score any points in the overall standings. His best result was 41st place on March 12 at Štrbské Pleso.

=== 1994–95 and 1995–96 seasons ===
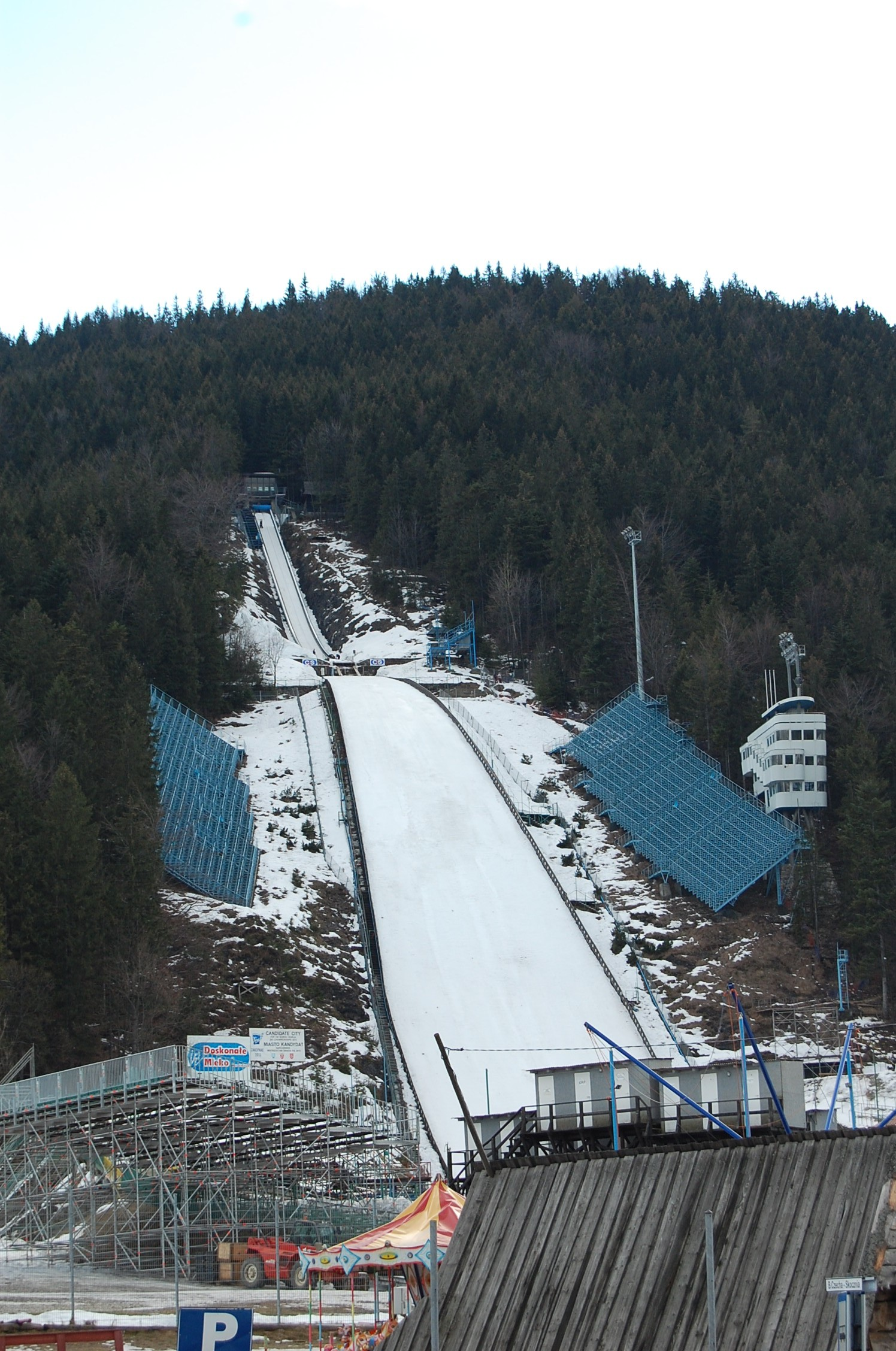
Wielka Krokiew in Zakopane – the ski jump where Oršula participated in World Cup qualifications for the first time in his career in 1996

In the summer of 1994, Oršula only participated in the Grand Prix in Frenštát pod Radhoštěm, where he was eliminated in the qualifying round. Before the start of the 1995–96 winter season, he took part in international competitions in Velenje, Rožnov pod Radhoštěm, Oberhof, and Frenštát pod Radhoštěm. He finished 11th in Frenštát in a group of 35 competitors born between 1978 and 1979, and 15th in Rožnov, where he outperformed 60 jumpers. In December, he competed in three Continental Cup events in Lauscha, Brotterode, and St. Moritz but finished in the lower positions, placing in the 70s, 80s, and 90s. In January 1996, at Wielka Krokiew in Zakopane, Oršula attempted to qualify for the World Cup for the first time but did not advance to the main competition, finishing in the qualifying rounds. At the end of January and early February, he participated in the FIS Nordic Junior World Ski Championships for the second time. In the team event at Trampolino di Pakstall in Asiago, alongside Martin Mesík, Peter Koštial, and Peter Diča, the Slovak team placed 8th. In the individual event, Oršula finished 52nd out of 74 jumpers.

=== 1996–97 season ===
During the 1996–97 season, Oršula participated in six Continental Cup qualifiers but failed to advance to any main competitions. These were his only appearances in events organized by the International Ski Federation that season. In August, he also competed in international events in Lomnice nad Popelkou, and in September and October, he took part in competitions in Rožnov and Frenštát. He twice finished in the top ten in these events: he was 6th in Rožnov at the Jana Žárská Cup and 8th in Frenštát in the Čokoládová Cena series.

=== 1997–98 season ===
In the summer of 1997, he participated in seven Continental Cup competitions – three times (in Velenje and twice in Zakopane), he ended his participation in the qualifiers, and four times he competed in the main events. In Frenštát pod Radhoštěm, he scored his first career points for the general classification, finishing 19th in the first competition and 12th in the second. He shared the mentioned 12th place with Martin Mesík and Gerd Siegmund. In the next competition of the cycle, in Oberhof, Oršula again placed in the top 30, finishing 22nd. In the winter, he participated four times in the qualifying rounds for World Cup events – in Villach, Harrachov, and twice in Zakopane, but he did not advance to any of the competitions. From January to March 1998, he took part in 10 Continental Cup competitions. He managed to score points for the general classification once – on February 14 in Saalfelden am Steinernen Meer, where the Slovak finished 26th. Throughout the season, he collected 48 Continental Cup points, placing him 159th in the overall classification.

=== 1998–99 season ===
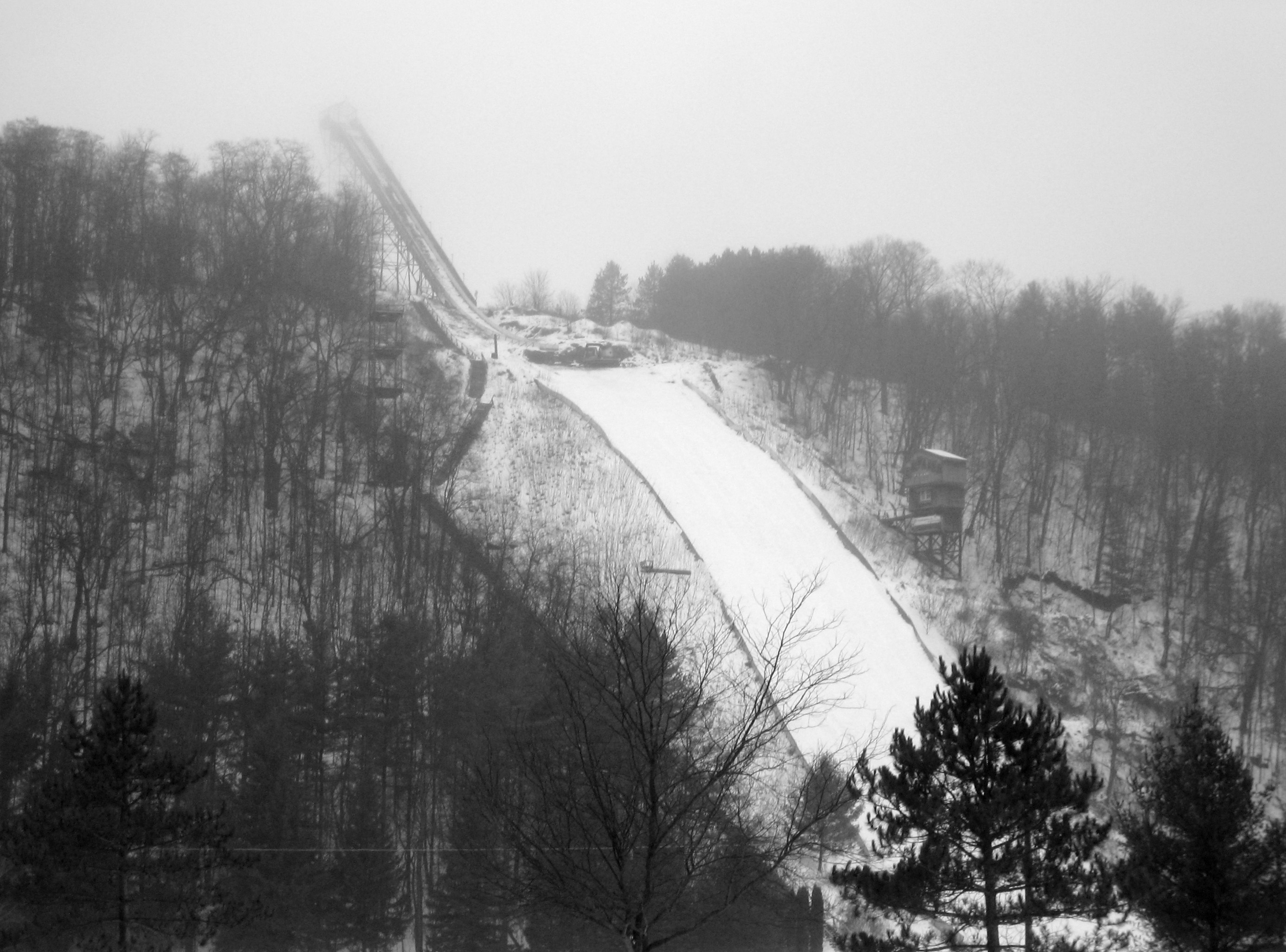
Snowflake – the ski jump in Westby where Oršula placed 7th in a Continental Cup event

In July and August 1998, he took part in four Continental Cup competitions – in Berchtesgaden and Villach, he did not qualify for the competitions, and in Zakopane, he finished 41st and 35th. In addition, during the summer, he also competed in three lower-tier events – in Lomnice nad Popelkou, Oberhof, and Frenštát pod Radhoštěm. In Lomnice, he finished 27th. These competitions included participants from the Czech Republic, Slovakia, Slovenia, and Switzerland, including the then 17-year-old Simon Ammann. In Oberhof, Oršula placed 32nd in the 13th edition of the Internationales Mattensprunglauf, and in Frenštát, he finished 24th in the local Grand Prix. During the winter season, in December, he participated in the qualifying rounds for six individual World Cup competitions but did not manage to advance to any of them. The same situation occurred in four competitions in January 1999, in Zakopane and Willingen. Meanwhile, he competed in Continental Cup events in Bad Goisern and Gallio. In Austria, he finished 55th in the first competition and did not qualify for the second one. In Italy, he scored four points for the classification, finishing 27th in the first competition and 48th in the second.

On 30 January 1999, in Willingen, he participated in the main event of the World Cup for the first time in his career. This event was a team competition in which the Slovak team finished last, in 11th place, with a lineup consisting of Michal Pšenko, Dušan Oršula, Filip Kafka, and Martin Mesík. The Slovak jumpers lost nearly 70 points to the French team, which placed 10th. Oršula's first appearance in an individual World Cup event occurred on February 7 in Harrachov. No qualification series was held, and all registered athletes were allowed to compete. The Slovak finished 37th out of 61 jumpers. He missed out on his first World Cup points by 8.9 points, as Christof Duffner held 30th place after the first round.

13 days after his performance in Harrachov, he achieved the best result of his career in a Continental Cup competition. He finished 7th in the competition at the Snowflake Ski Jump in Westby, though he lost significantly (by a margin of 12.4–31.1 points) to the competitors ahead of him. The next day in Westby, the Slovak placed 17th. He also participated in four more Continental Cup competitions in the United States – one in Iron Mountain and three in Ishpeming. In the first of these, he finished 20th, earning another 11 points for the general classification. In Ishpeming, he scored only one point, placing 30th in the third competition. In the remaining starts, he finished 34th and 52nd. The 66 points he collected during the season placed him 138th in the overall classification of the cycle. At the end of the winter season, he participated in the qualifying rounds for three Ski Flying World Cup competitions in Planica, but he did not manage to advance. These were the only ski flying World Cup starts of his career.

Apart from international competitions, in February and March, he participated in the Slovak Ski Jumping Championships in Štrbské Pleso and Králiky. He won three medals – silver and bronze individually, and gold in the team competition. He won the team championship title with the Dukla Banská Bystrica I team, which included Rastislav Leško and Martin Mesík.

=== 1999–2000 season ===
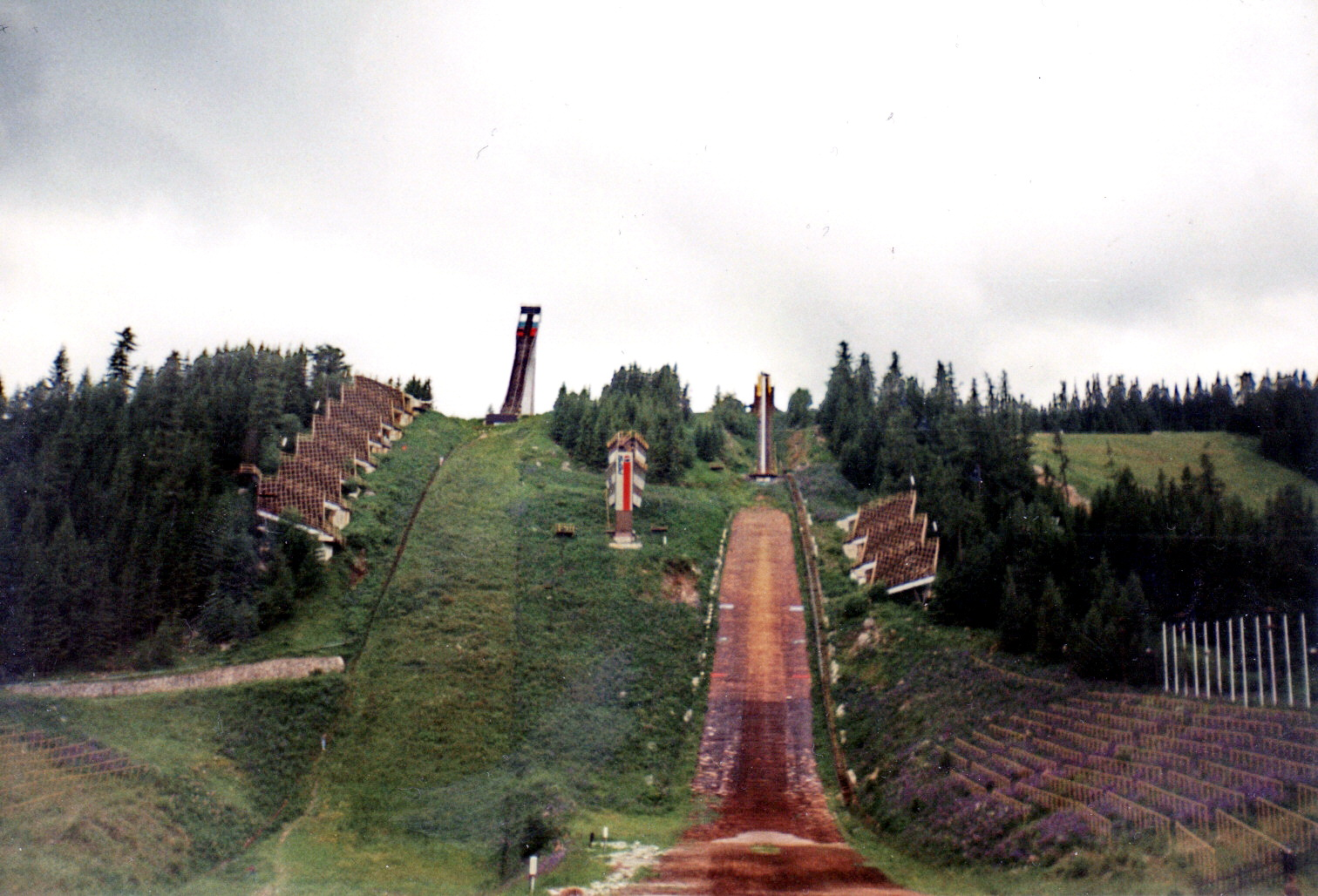
The MS 1970 ski jumps in Štrbské Pleso – on the right is the normal hill, MS 1970 B, where Oršula twice became a team champion and three times an individual runner-up in Slovakia from 1999 to 2003

In August 1999, Dušan Oršula competed in two Continental Cup events in Zakopane. In the first competition, he placed 49th, and in the second, he finished 19th, earning 12 points for the overall classification. In September, he participated in the Grand Prix in Frenštát pod Radhoštěm but placed a distant 34th. In October, also in Frenštát, he finished 13th in the Hotel Vlčina Cup.

In December 1999, Oršula attempted to qualify for the World Cup in Zakopane but failed to advance. This was his only attempt to qualify for a World Cup event that season. He participated in ten Continental Cup events, competing twice in Braunlage, Westby, Ishpeming, Eisenerz, and Harrachov. He earned points in four competitions, all in the United States. In February, he finished 19th and 11th in Westby and 21st and 15th in Ishpeming. Each of these competitions had from 51 to 52 participants. In addition, Oršula came close to earning points in Eisenerz and twice in Harrachov, placing 34th and 37th. In total, he scored 74 points and ranked 128th in the overall Continental Cup standings, his best result in his career.

In January 2000, Oršula became the team champion of Slovakia during the competition in Štrbské Pleso, competing alongside Matej Uram, Ján Zelenčík, and Martin Mesík. In March of that year, at the international Slovak Championships in Králiky, Oršula was the third-best Slovak and won a bronze medal.

=== 2000–01 season ===
In July 2000, Dušan Oršula finished 18th, tied with Frank Reichel, in the Continental Cup event in Villach. In August, also in Villach, he attempted to qualify for the Summer Grand Prix for the first time in his career but did not advance to the main event. Two weeks later, alongside Martin Mesík, Matej Uram, and Peter Koštial, he competed in the team competition of the Continental Cup in Winterberg. The Slovak team placed 8th out of 11 teams, defeating Kazakhstan, Switzerland, and Russia. In the individual competition, Oršula finished 36th, tied with Tomisław Tajner. During the summer season, Oršula also participated in competitions in Harrachov and Frenštát. In Harrachov, he placed 13th, again tying with Tomisław Tajner. In Frenštát, he finished 26th. Both competitions were international events with participants from the Czech Republic, Poland, and Slovakia.

In the winter of the 2000–01 season, Oršula competed in the Continental Cup, participating in 12 events. In his first competition in St. Moritz, he did not qualify for the main event. He scored points three times throughout the season, finishing in the top 30. The first instance was in late January 2001 in Lauscha, where he placed 25th, tied with Aleksandr Korobov. He earned additional points on February 18 in Iron Mountain, finishing 24th out of 48 participants. The third competition where Oršula earned points, and also his best result in the winter Continental Cup that season, was in Harrachov on March 11, where he placed 16th. He shared the same score as Jan Matura and Gerhard Hofer. These performances, including the summer season, earned Oršula 41 points and a 152nd place in the overall standings of the cycle.

=== 2001–02 season ===
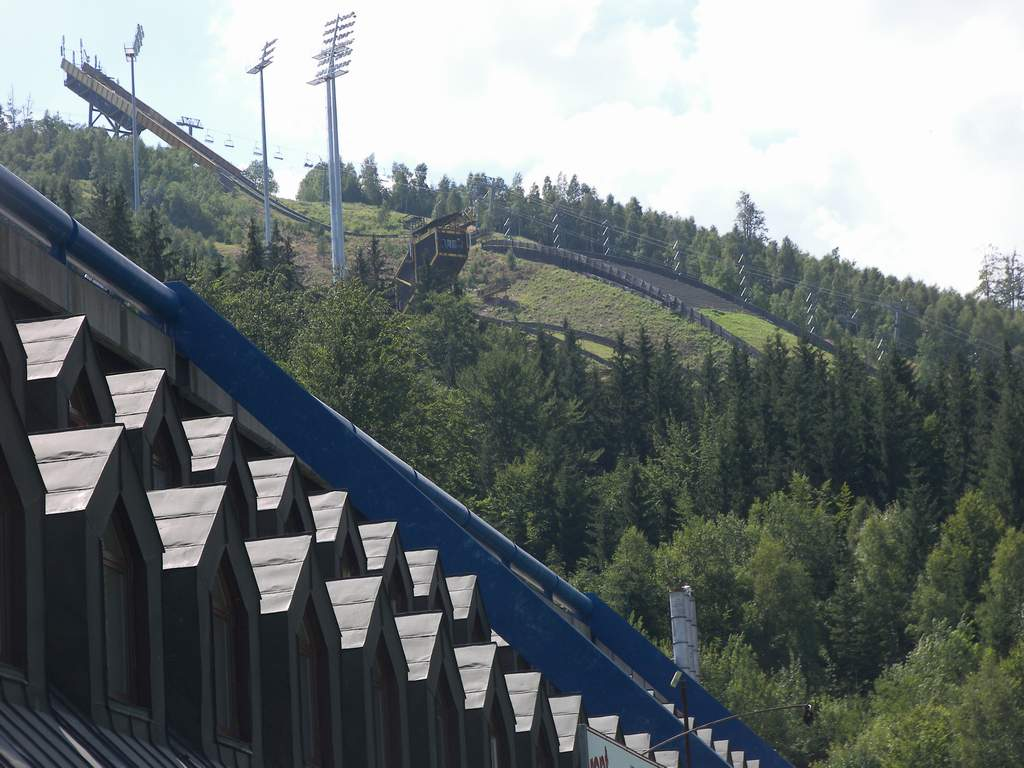
Čerťák ski jump in Harrachov where Oršula placed 47th at the 2002 Ski Flying World Championships

In the summer of 2001, Oršula began by competing in the Continental Cup. He participated in two individual events of this circuit – in Velenje and Oberstdorf. In Slovenia, he placed 55th, ahead of three classified competitors – Yuri Rulev, Stefano Chiapolino, and Ciprian Ioniță. In Germany, the Slovak athlete ranked 71st among 112 ski jumpers. In Oberstdorf, together with Matej Uram, Martin Mesík, and Ján Zelenčík, he placed 11th in the team competition of the Continental Cup, beating teams from Sweden and France. After these performances, Oršula participated in the Summer Grand Prix. For the first time in his career, he advanced to the main competition of this series, which took place on August 11 in Hinterzarten. He placed 49th in the event, defeating Lasse Ottesen. He attempted to qualify for the second competition in Hinterzarten, as well as in Courchevel and Stams, but failed to advance to the main events. On the last day of August, he placed 14th in the 31st edition of the Hotel Vlčina Cup in Frenštát. In September, he finished 18th at the Polish Summer Championships on the Średnia Krokiew in Zakopane, trailing the winner Adam Małysz by 77.5 points. After this competition, he was scheduled to participate in the Continental Cup in Oberhof but was unable to due to an ankle injury sustained during a soccer match.

Oršula's winter season began with two Continental Cup events in Rukatunturi, where he placed 44th and 47th. In December, he participated in the World Cup qualifications in Villach, where he ranked 59th among the qualifiers, ahead of only Boy van Baarle and Georgi Zharkov. At the end of December, he competed in two Continental Cup events in Switzerland – failing to qualify in St. Moritz and finishing 42nd in Engelberg.

At the turn of 2001 and 2002, Oršula tried to qualify for all four competitions of the 50th Four Hills Tournament but did not make it to the main events. In Oberstdorf, he placed 78th in the qualifications, tied with Robert Mateja. In Garmisch-Partenkirchen, he finished 83rd, 85th in Innsbruck, and 68th in Bischofshofen. Meanwhile, a day before the qualifications in Innsbruck, he competed in a Continental Cup event there, finishing in 51st place. In the first World Cup competition after the Four Hills Tournament, on January 12 in Willingen, Oršula placed 43rd. He was 28.3 points short of making the top 30 and scoring his first World Cup points. He also participated in the World Cup qualifications in Zakopane but did not advance to the main events, placing 60th in the first qualification (Note: He placed 48th among the competitors who had to qualify.) and 56th in the second. (Note: He placed 43rd among the competitors who had to qualify.)

In February, Oršula competed in two Continental Cup events in Gallio. In the first competition, he finished 20th, earning his only points of the season for the overall classification. In the second competition, he placed 57th. Also in February, he became the runner-up at the Slovak National Championships on the MS 1970 B hill in Štrbské Pleso, losing by 9.5 points to Martin Mesík.

In March, Oršula participated in the Ski Flying World Championships in Harrachov. In the individual competition, he jumped 104 meters and finished 47th after the first round, ahead of Jakub Janda and Roar Ljøkelsøy. During his jumps in Harrachov, he achieved a distance of 126 meters.

=== 2002–03 season ===
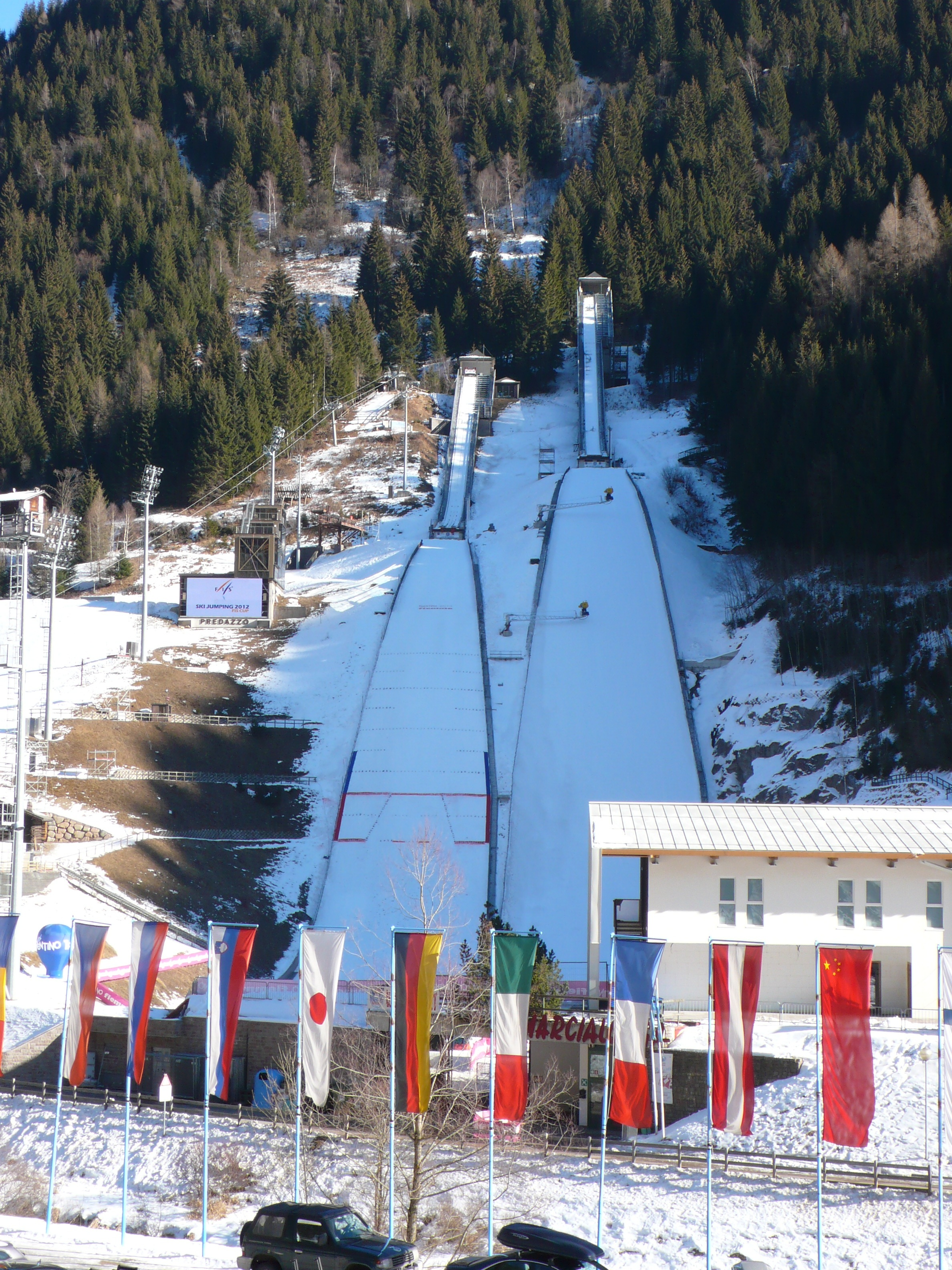
Trampolino dal Ben complex in Predazzo, where Oršula participated in the qualifications for the World Championships

In 2002, Oršula began his summer season with three appearances in the Summer Continental Cup. However, he did not score any points in the overall classification. He came closest to advancing to the final round in the first competition in Velenje, where he placed 32nd, just half a point behind Jiří Parma and Jens Salumäe, who were tied for 30th place. In the second competition in Velenje, Oršula finished 42nd, tied with Maxim Polunin. In the third event of the cycle, in Oberstdorf, he placed 74th out of 111 competitors. He also participated in the qualifications for three Summer Grand Prix competitions – twice in Hinterzarten and once in Courchevel – but did not advance to the main events. In October, he competed in the international Slovak Summer Championships in Banská Bystrica, finishing 7th overall and 6th among Slovak ski jumpers.

During the 2002–03 winter season, Oršula repeatedly failed to advance past the qualification rounds in the World Cup, with 10 unsuccessful attempts. This included two events in December in Trondheim, all four events of the 51st Four Hills Tournament at the turn of 2002 and 2003, one event in Liberec in January, two events in Zakopane, and one in Willingen. In the first of the February World Cup competitions in Willingen, Oršula did manage to qualify, finishing 50th out of 57 competitors. In the main event, he jumped 99.5 meters and placed 44th, ahead of only four competitors (Note: Maximilian Mechler did not start, and Maxime Remy was disqualified.) – Ingemar Mayr, Marc Vogel, Florentin Durand, and Christoph Kreuzer. He was 36.9 points short of reaching 30th place, which was held by Martin Schmitt.

In addition to his World Cup appearances, Oršula participated in eleven Continental Cup events during the winter season, but he did not earn any points in the overall classification. His closest result was 37th in Liberec on 22 December 2002.

In mid-February, Oršula won his third runner-up title at the Slovak National Championships. On the normal hill in Štrbské Pleso, he finished second, losing to Martin Mesík by 7.5 points. At the end of February, Oršula competed for the first and only time in the World Championships in Nordic Skiing. He participated in the qualification rounds for both individual events at the championships – on the large and normal hills in the "Giuseppe Dal Ben" Ski Jumping Arena in Predazzo – but placed 54th both times, failing to advance to the main competitions.

== World Championships ==
=== Individual events ===
2003 (Italy) Fiemme Valley/Predazzo	–	did not qualify (K-120), did not qualify (K-95)

=== Detailed results of Oršula at the World Championships ===
Position	Date	Location	Ski jump	K-point	Event	Jump 1	Jump 2	Score	Difference	Winner
NQ	22 February 2003	(Italy) Predazzo	"Giuseppe Dal Ben" Ski Jumping Arena	K-120	Individual	86.5 m		41.7	Did not qualify	
NQ	28 February 2003	(Italy) Predazzo	"Giuseppe Dal Ben" Ski Jumping Arena	K-95	Individual	77.5 m		72.5	Did not qualify	

== Ski Flying World Championships ==
Position	Date	Location	Ski jump	K-point	Event	Jump 1	Jump 2	Jump 3	Jump 4	Score	Difference	Winner
47	9 March 2002	(Czech Republic) Harrachov	Čerťák	K-185	Individual	104.0 m	nq	nq	nq	62.8	333.5	Sven Hannawald

== World Junior Championships ==
Position	Date	Location	Ski jump	K-point	Event	Jump 1	Jump 2	Score	Difference	Winner
14	27 January 1994	(Austria) Breitenwang	Raimund-Ertl-Schanze	K-85	Team (Note: Team composition: Ján Vojtko, Dušan Oršula, Vladimir Čunderlík and Jozef Kepšta)	52.0 m	60.0 m	481.0 (99.5)	359.0	Finland
70	30 January 1994	(Austria) Breitenwang	Raimund-Ertl-Schanze	K-85	Individual	52.0 m	49.0 m	68.5	147.0	Janne Ahonen
8	31 January 1996	(Italy) Asiago	Trampolino di Pakstall	K-92	Team (Note: Team composition: Martin Mesík, Peter Koštial, Peter Diča and Dušan Oršula)	83.0 m	76.5 m	714.5 (161.5)	147.0	Germany
52	4 February 1996	(Italy) Asiago	Trampolino di Pakstall	K-92	Individual	84.5 m	74.0 m	160.5	106.5	Michael Uhrmann

== Ski Jumping World Cup ==
=== Positions in individual World Cup events ===
1995–96 season
Lillehammer K90	Lillehammer K120	Villach K90	Planica K120	Predazzo K90	Chamonix K95	Chamonix K95	Oberhof K120	Oberstdorf K115	Garmisch-Partenkirchen K107	Innsbruck K110	Bischofshofen K120	Engelberg K120	Engelberg K120	Sapporo K90	Sapporo K115	Zakopane K116	Zakopane K116	MŚL – Bad Mitterndorf K185	MŚL – Bad Mitterndorf K185	Iron Mountain K120	Iron Mountain K120	Kuopio K92	Lahti K90	Lahti K114	Harrachov K180	Falun K90	Oslo K110	points	
-	-	-	-	-	-	-	-	-	-	-	-	-	-	-	-	q	q	-	-	-	-	-	-	-	-	-	-	0	
1997–98 season
Lillehammer K120	Lillehammer K120	Predazzo K120	Villach K90	Harrachov K90	Engelberg K120	Engelberg K120	Oberstdorf K115	Garmisch-Partenkirchen K115	Innsbruck K110	Bischofshofen K120	Ramsau K90	Zakopane K116	Zakopane K116	MŚL – Oberstdorf K185	MŚL – Oberstdorf K185	Sapporo K120	Vikersund K175	Vikersund K175	Kuopio K120	Lahti K116	Lahti K116	Falun K115	Trondheim K120	Oslo K112	Planica K120	Planica K120	points		
-	-	-	q	q	-	-	-	-	-	-	-	q	q	-	-	-	-	-	-	-	-	-	-	-	-	-	0		
1998–99 season
Lillehammer K120	Lillehammer K120	Chamonix K95	Chamonix K95	Predazzo K120	Oberhof K120	Harrachov K120	Harrachov K120	Oberstdorf K115	Garmisch-Partenkirchen K115	Innsbruck K110	Bischofshofen K120	Engelberg K120	Engelberg K120	Zakopane K116	Zakopane K116	Sapporo K120	Sapporo K120	Willingen K120	Willingen K120	Harrachov K120	Kuopio K120	Lahti K90	Trondheim K120	Falun K115	Oslo K115	Planica K185	Planica K185	Planica K185	points
-	-	q	q	q	q	q	q	-	-	-	-	-	-	q	q	-	-	q	q	37	-	-	-	-	-	q	q	q	0
1999–2000 season
Kuopio K120	Kuopio K120	Predazzo K120	Predazzo K120	Villach K90	Zakopane K116	Zakopane K116	Oberstdorf K115	Garmisch-Partenkirchen K115	Innsbruck K110	Bischofshofen K120	Engelberg K120	Engelberg K120	Sapporo K120	Sapporo K120	Hakuba K120	Willingen K120	Willingen K120	Bad Mitterndorf K185	Iron Mountain K120	Iron Mountain K120	Lahti K116	Lahti K116	Trondheim K120	Oslo K115	Planica K185	points			
-	-	-	-	-	-	q	-	-	-	-	-	-	-	-	-	-	-	-	-	-	-	-	-	-	-	0			
2001–02 season
Kuopio K120	Kuopio K120	Titisee-Neustadt K120	Titisee-Neustadt K120	Villach K90	Engelberg K120	Engelberg K120	Predazzo K120	Predazzo K120	Oberstdorf K115	Garmisch-Partenkirchen K115	Innsbruck K120	Bischofshofen K120	Willingen K120	Zakopane K120	Zakopane K120	Hakuba K120	Sapporo K120	Lahti K116	Falun K115	Trondheim K120	Oslo K115	points							
-	-	-	-	q	-	-	-	-	q	q	q	q	43	q	q	-	-	-	-	-	-	0							
2002–03 season
Ruka K120	Ruka K120	Trondheim K120	Trondheim K120	Titisee-Neustadt K120	Titisee-Neustadt K120	Engelberg K120	Engelberg K120	Oberstdorf K115	Garmisch-Partenkirchen K115	Innsbruck K120	Bischofshofen K120	Liberec K120	Zakopane K120	Zakopane K120	Hakuba K120	Sapporo K120	Sapporo K120	Bad Mitterndorf K185	Bad Mitterndorf K185	Willingen K120	Willingen K120	Oslo K115	Lahti K116	Lahti K116	Planica K185	Planica K185	points		
-	-	q	q	-	-	-	-	q	q	q	q	q	q	q	-	-	-	-	-	44	q	-	-	-	-	-	0		
Legend
1 2 3 4–10 11–30 below 30 dq – disqualified q – did not qualify q – did not qualify - – did not start

== Ski Jumping Continental Cup ==
=== Overall standings by season ===
Season	Place
1997–98	159
1998–99	138
1999–2000	128
2000–01	152
2001–02	229

=== Results in individual Continental Cup events ===
1993–94 season
Lillehammer	Lillehammer	Oberwiesenthal	Lauscha	Woergl	Sankt Moritz	Sankt Aegyd	Gallio	Sapporo	Sapporo	Willingen	Willingen	Ironwood	Ironwood	Ruhpolding	Saalfelden	Planica	Iron Mountain	Iron Mountain	Ishpeming	Schönwald	Titisee-Neustadt	Calgary	Calgary	Zaō	Zakopane	Zakopane	Štrbské Pleso	Štrbské Pleso	Sprova	Sprova	Ruka	Rovaniemi	points																		
-	-	-	-	-	-	-	39	-	-	-	-	-	-	-	-	-	-	-	-	59	42	-	-	-	48	63	41	58	-	-	-	-	0																		
1995–96 season
Lauscha	Brotterode	Lahti	Lahti	Kuopio	Sankt Moritz	Lake Placid	Lake Placid	Bad Goisern	Reit im Winkl	Sapporo	Sapporo	Sapporo	Saalfelden	Berchtesgaden	Willingen	Liberec	Liberec	Seefeld	Westby	Westby	Gallio	Gallio	Örnsköldsvik	Örnsköldsvik	Schönwald	Titisee-Neustadt	Bollnäs	Sapporo	Beuil	Beuil	Falun	Zaō	Zaō	Planica	Planica	Voss	Voss	Rovaniemi	Ruka	points											
78	86	-	-	-	61	-	-	-	-	-	-	-	-	-	-	-	-	-	-	-	-	-	-	-	-	-	-	-	-	-	-	-	-	-	-	-	-	-	-	0											
1996–97 season
Courchevel	Zakopane	Frenštát pod Radhoštěm	Hakuba	Hakuba	Muju	Muju	Chaux-Neuve	Chaux-Neuve	Brotterode	Lauscha	Sankt Moritz	Lake Placid	Lake Placid	Ramsau	Villach	Planica	Sapporo	Sapporo	Sapporo	Oberhof	Oberhof	Štrbské Pleso	Zakopane	Reit im Winkl	Westby	Westby	Saalfelden	Ruhpolding	Iron Mountain	Iron Mountain	Ishpeming	Ishpeming	Sapporo	Braunlage	Braunlage	Zaō	Zaō	Vikersund	Vikersund	Courchevel	Courchevel	Harrachov	Harrachov	Ruka	Rovaniemi	points					
-	-	q	-	-	-	-	-	-	q	q	-	-	-	-	-	-	-	-	-	-	-	q	-	-	-	-	q	q	-	-	-	-	-	-	-	-	-	-	-	-	-	-	-	-	-	0					
1997–98 season
Velenje	Rælingen	Zakopane	Zakopane	Frenštát pod Radhoštěm	Frenštát pod Radhoštěm	Oberhof	Oberhof	Hakuba	Hakuba	Chamonix	Chamonix	Lahti	Lahti	Lahti	Oberwiesenthal	Oberwiesenthal	Sankt Moritz	Sapporo	Sapporo	Sapporo	Garmisch-Partenkirchen	Garmisch-Partenkirchen	Liberec	Liberec	Villach	Westby	Westby	Planica	Planica	Reit im Winkl	Iron Mountain	Iron Mountain	Saalfelden	Ruhpolding	Oslo	Willingen	Willingen	Ishpeming	Ishpeming	Schönwald	Schönwald	Sapporo	Zaō	Zaō	Courchevel	Courchevel	Rovaniemi	Ruka	Ruka	points	
q	-	q	q	19	12	22	53	-	-	-	-	-	-	-	-	-	-	-	-	-	-	-	49	35	39	-	-	-	-	42	-	-	26	35	-	43	40	-	-	59	33	-	-	-	-	-	-	-	-	48	
1998–99 season
Velenje	Velenje	Berchtesgaden	Villach	Oberstdorf	Oberstdorf	Zakopane	Zakopane	Rælingen	Kuopio	Lahti	Lahti	Sankt Moritz	Engelberg	Bad Goisern	Bad Goisern	Sapporo	Sapporo	Sapporo	Lauscha	Lauscha	Gallio	Gallio	Reit im Winkl	Saalfelden	Ruhpolding	Braunlage	Braunlage	Westby	Westby	Planica	Planica	Titisee-Neustadt	Iron Mountain	Schönwald	Ishpeming	Ishpeming	Ishpeming	Sapporo	Zaō	Zaō	Courchevel	Courchevel	Vikersund	Vikersund	Hede	Hede	Kuopio	Rovaniemi	Ruka	Ruka	points
-	-	q	q	-	-	41	35	-	-	-	-	-	-	55	q	-	-	-	-	-	27	48	-	-	-	-	-	7	17	-	-	-	20	-	34	52	30	-	-	-	-	-	-	-	-	-	-	-	-	-	66
1999–2000 season
Velenje	Velenje	Villach	Villach	Oberstdorf	Zakopane	Zakopane	Rælingen	Hakuba	Hakuba	Trondheim	Trondheim	Kuopio	Lahti	Lahti	Innsbruck	Engelberg	Gallio	Gallio	Sapporo	Sapporo	Sapporo	Brotterode	Lauscha	Braunlage	Braunlage	Hakuba	Hakuba	Courchevel	Courchevel	Berchtesgaden	Saalfelden	Mislinja	Westby	Westby	Planica	Planica	Ishpeming	Ishpeming	Schönwald	Titisee-Neustadt	Eisenerz	Eisenerz	Zaō	Zaō	Våler	Våler	Harrachov	Harrachov	Rovaniemi	Ruka	points
-	-	-	-	-	49	19	-	-	-	-	-	-	-	-	-	-	-	-	-	-	-	-	-	45	q	-	-	-	-	-	-	-	19	11	-	-	21	15	-	-	46	37	-	-	-	-	37	34	-	-	74
2000–01 season
Velenje	Velenje	Villach	Oberstdorf	Rælingen	Rælingen	Winterberg	Sankt Moritz	Innsbruck	Bischofshofen	Sapporo	Sapporo	Sapporo	Brotterode	Brotterode	Lauscha	Lauscha	Ramsau	Schönwald	Westby	Westby	Titisee-Neustadt	Planica	Iron Mountain	Iron Mountain	Ishpeming	Chamonix	Chamonix	Zakopane	Zakopane	Vikersund	Vikersund	Harrachov	Harrachov	Våler	Zaō	Zaō	Örnsköldsvik	Örnsköldsvik	Hede	points											
-	-	18	-	-	-	36	q	-	-	-	-	-	-	-	25	36	-	-	36	34	-	-	35	24	31	-	-	36	40	-	-	32	16	-	-	-	-	-	-	41											
2001–02 season
Velenje	Velenje	Villach	Villach	Oberstdorf	Rælingen	Rælingen	Calgary	Calgary	Park City	Park City	Oberhof	Ruka	Ruka	Lahti	Lahti	Sankt Moritz	Engelberg	Innsbruck	Sapporo	Sapporo	Sapporo	Bischofshofen	Bischofshofen	Ishpeming	Ishpeming	Courchevel	Courchevel	Lauscha	Westby	Westby	Braunlage	Braunlage	Gallio	Gallio	Planica	Iron Mountain	Iron Mountain	Schönwald	Schönwald	Zaō	Zaō	Vikersund	Vikersund	Vikersund	points						
55	-	-	-	71	-	-	-	-	-	-	-	44	47	-	-	q	42	51	-	-	-	-	-	-	-	-	-	-	-	-	-	-	20	57	-	-	-	-	-	-	-	-	-	-	11						
2002–03 season
Lahti	Lahti	Liberec	Liberec	Sankt Moritz	Engelberg	Seefeld	Bischofshofen	Sapporo	Sapporo	Sapporo	Planica	Planica	Titisee-Neustadt	Titisee-Neustadt	Braunlage	Braunlage	Willingen	Zakopane	Zakopane	Eisenerz	Eisenerz	Westby	Brotterode	Brotterode	Lauscha	Ishpeming	Ishpeming	Ishpeming	Ruhpolding	Ruhpolding	Zaō	Zaō	Stryn	Stryn	points																
45	41	54	37	-	-	55	52	-	-	-	-	-	58	49	54	41	58	-	-	-	-	-	-	-	-	-	-	-	-	-	-	-	-	-	0																
Legend
1 2 3 4–10 11–30 below 30 dq – disqualified q – did not qualify - – did not start

== Summer Grand Prix ==
=== Places in individual competitions of the Summer Grand Prix ===
2000
Hinterzarten K95	Kuopio K120	Villach K90	Courchevel K120	Hakuba K120	Hakuba K120	Sapporo K120	Sapporo K120	points
-	-	q	-	-	-	-	-	0
2001
Hinterzarten K95	Hinterzarten K95	Courchevel K120	Stams K105	Sapporo K120	Hakuba K120	Hakuba K120	points	
49	q	q	q	-	-	-	0	
2002
Hinterzarten K95	Hinterzarten K95	Courchevel K120	Lahti K116	Lahti K116	Innsbruck K120	points		
q	q	q	-	-	-	0		
Legend
1 2 3 4–10 11–30 below 30 q – did not qualify: – did not start

== Summer Continental Cup ==
=== Places in individual competitions of the Summer Continental Cup ===
2002
Velenje	Velenje	Oberstdorf	Rælingen	Rælingen	Falun	Calgary	Calgary	Park City	Park City	points
32	42	74	-	-	-	-	-	-	-	0
Legend
1 2 3 4–10 11–30 below 30 dq – disqualified - − did not start

== Slovak championships ==
Position	Date	Location	Ski jump	K-point	Event	Jump 1	Jump 2	Points	Difference	Winner
2nd	13 February 1999	(Slovakia) Štrbské Pleso	MS 1970 B	K-90	Individual	85.0 m	85.5 m	209.5	2.0 points behind	Martin Mesík
1st	14 February 1999	(Slovakia) Štrbské Pleso	MS 1970 B	K-90	Team (Note: The team lineup for Dukla Banská Bystrica I: Rastislav Leško, Dušan Oršula, and Martin Mesík.)	N/A	N/A	629.5	–	–
3rd	27 March 1999	(Slovakia) Králiky	Skokanské mostíky Dukla	K-120	Individual	117.5 m	116.0 m	220.2	6.2 points behind	Matej Uram
1st	16 January 2000	(Slovakia) Štrbské Pleso	MS 1970 B	K-90	Team (Note: The team lineup for LKS Dukla Banská Bystrica A: Matej Uram, Dušan Oršula, Ján Zelenčík, and Martin Mesík.)	N/A	N/A	854.0	–	–
3rd	25 March 2000	(Slovakia) Králiky	Skokanské mostíky Dukla	K-120	Individual	N/A	N/A	231.1	40.0 points behind (Note: The difference to Matej Uram – the best Slovak in the international Slovak championships. The competition was won by Manuel Fettner, with Oršula trailing by 95.3 points.)	Matej Uram
2nd	16 February 2002	(Slovakia) Štrbské Pleso	MS 1970 B	K-90	Individual	85.5 m	87.0 m	208.5	9.5 points behind	Martin Mesík
2nd	15 February 2003	(Slovakia) Štrbské Pleso	MS 1970 B	K-90	Individual	N/A	N/A	226.0	7.5 points behind	Martin Mesík
