= 2000–01 FIS Ski Jumping Continental Cup =

Ski-jumping competition series

FIS Continental Cup 2000/01
Winners
- Overall: (Finland) Akseli Lajunen

Competitions
- Venues: 26
- Individual: 40
- Team: 3
- Cancelled: 11 Individual + 1 Team

The 2000/01 FIS Ski Jumping Continental Cup was the 10th in a row (8th official) Continental Cup winter season in ski jumping for men. Europa Cup was a predecessor of Continental Cup.

For the first time in history of Continental Cup competition, team events were introduced.

Other competitive circuits this season included the World Cup and Grand Prix.

== Men's Individual ==
Individual events in the CC history

Total	F	L	N	Winners
393	2	143	248	170

after large hill event in Hede (18 March 2001)

=== Calendar ===
All	No.	Date	Place (Hill)	Size	Winner	Second	Third
354	1	7 July 2000	(Slovenia) Velenje (Grajski grič K85)	N _{222}	(Japan) Hiroki Yamada	(Germany) Kai Bracht	(Finland) Toni Nieminen
355	2	8 July 2000	(Slovenia) Velenje (Grajski grič K85)	N _{223}	(Japan) Hiroki Yamada	(Norway) David Andersen	(Finland) Akseli Lajunen (Germany) Kai Bracht
356	3	15 July 2000	(Austria) Villach (Villacher Alpenarena K90)	N _{224}	(Austria) Stefan Thurnbichler	(Austria) Thomas Hörl	(Austria) Manuel Fettner
357	4	29 July 2000	(Germany) Oberstdorf (Schattenbergschanze K90)	N _{225}	(Poland) Adam Małysz	(Czech Republic) Jakub Janda	(Switzerland) Marco Steinauer
358	5	19 August 2000	(Norway) Rælingen (Marikollen K88)	N _{226}	(Norway) Morten Solem (Finland) Toni Nieminen		(Norway) Lasse Ottesen
359	6	20 August 2000	(Norway) Rælingen (Marikollen K88)	N _{227}	(Slovenia) Jure Radelj	(Germany) Roland Audenrieth	(Norway) Lasse Ottesen
360	7	27 August 2000	(Germany) Winterberg (Sankt-Georg-Sprungschanze K80)	N _{228}	(Norway) Bjørn Einar Romøren	(Austria) Manuel Fettner	(Austria) Stefan Thurnbichler
		9 December 2000	(Finland) Kuopio (Puijo K120)	L _{cnx}	cancelled due to lack of snow		
		10 December 2000	(Finland) Kuopio (Puijo K120)	L _{cnx}	cancelled due to lack of snow		
		16 December 2000	(Finland) Lahti (Salpausselkä K116)	L _{cnx}	cancelled due to lack of snow		
		16 December 2000	(Czechoslovakia) Liberec (Ještěd A K120)	L _{cnx}	cancelled due to lack of snow		
		17 December 2000	(Finland) Lahti (Salpausselkä K116)	L _{cnx}	cancelled due to lack of snow		
		17 December 2000	(Czechoslovakia) Liberec (Ještěd A K120)	L _{cnx}	cancelled due to lack of snow		
361	8	26 December 2000	(Switzerland) St. Moritz (Olympiaschanze K95)	N _{229}			
		28 December 2000	(Switzerland) Engelberg (Gross-Titlis-Schanze K120)	L _{cnx}	cancelled due to lack of snow		
362	9	2 January 2001	(Austria) Innsbruck (Bergiselschanze K110)	L _{131}	(Austria) Manuel Fettner	(Austria) Stefan Kaiser	(Finland) Akseli Lajunen
363	10	4 January 2001	(Austria) Bischofshofen (Paul-Ausserleitner-Schanze K120)	L _{132}	(Finland) Veli-Matti Lindström	(Finland) Akseli Lajunen	(Germany) Kai Bracht
364	11	12 January 2001	(Japan) Sapporo (Miyanomori K90)	N _{230}	(Japan) Yukitaka Fukita	(Japan) Masahiko Harada	(Japan) Naoki Yasuzaki (Austria) Martin Koch
		12 January 2001	(Italy) Gallio (Trampolino di Pakstall K90)	N _{cnx}	lack of snow		
365	12	13 January 2001	(Japan) Sapporo (Ōkurayama K120)	L _{133}	(Japan) Yukitaka Fukita	(Japan) Hideharu Miyahira	(Austria) Martin Koch
		13 January 2001	(Italy) Gallio (Trampolino di Pakstall K90)	N _{cnx}	lack of snow		
366	13	14 January 2001	(Japan) Sapporo (Ōkurayama K120)	L _{134}	(Japan) Masahiko Harada	(Japan) Sōta Okamura	(Japan) Hideharu Miyahira
367	14	20 January 2001	(Germany) Brotterode (Inselbergschanze K98)	N _{231}	(Finland) Tami Kiuru	(Norway) Anders Bardal	(Germany) Christoph Grillhösl
368	15	21 January 2001	(Germany) Brotterode (Inselbergschanze K98)	N _{232}	(Finland) Tami Kiuru	(Norway) Bjørn Einar Romøren	(Finland) Akseli Lajunen
369	16	27 January 2001	(Germany) Lauscha (Marktiegelschanze K92)	N _{233}	(Finland) Akseli Lajunen	(Finland) Tami Kiuru	(Germany) Dennis Störl
370	17	28 January 2001	(Germany) Lauscha (Marktiegelschanze K92)	N _{234}	(Slovenia) Igor Medved	(Czech Republic) Michal Doležal	(Finland) Tami Kiuru
371	18	4 February 2001	(Austria) Ramsau (W90-Mattensprunganlage K90)	N _{235}	(Austria) Markus Eigentler	(Germany) Frank Reichel	(Slovenia) Jure Bogataj (Germany) Georg Späth (Austria) Stefan Thurnbichler
372	19	9 February 2001	(Germany) Schönwald (Adlerschanzen Schönwald K85)	N _{236}	(Finland) Tami Kiuru	(Germany) Georg Späth	(Germany) Maximilian Mechler (Germany) Roland Audenrieth
373	20	10 February 2001	(United States) Westby (Snowflake K106) (Note: Not clear if Snowflake hill in Westby had K-point at K106 or K113 at that time.)	L _{135}	(Finland) Lassi Huuskonen	(Germany) Christoph Grillhösl	(Japan) Sōta Okamura
374	21	11 February 2001	(Germany) Titisee-Neustadt (Hochfirstschanze K120)	L _{136}	(Austria) Manuel Fettner	(Austria) Reinhard Schwarzenberger	(Germany) Georg Späth
29th Schwarzwald Tournament Overall (9 and 11 February 2001)					(Germany) Georg Späth	(Finland) Tami Kiuru	(Finland) Pasi Ahonen
375	22	11 February 2001	(United States) Westby (Snowflake K106)	L _{137}	(Slovenia) Robert Kranjec	(Finland) Janne Ylijärvi	(Finland) Lassi Huuskonen
376	23	17 February 2001	(Slovenia) Planica (Bloudkova velikanka K120)	L _{138}	(Germany) Georg Späth	(Austria) Markus Eigentler	(Germany) Christof Duffner
377	24	17 February 2001	(United States) Iron Mountain (Pine Mountain Ski Jump K120)	L _{139}	(Japan) Sōta Okamura	(Slovenia) Robert Kranjec	(Japan) Kazuki Nishishita
378	25	18 February 2001	(United States) Iron Mountain (Pine Mountain Ski Jump K120)	L _{140}	(Slovenia) Robert Kranjec	(Germany) Kai Bracht	(Finland) Lassi Huuskonen
379	26	24 February 2001	(France) Chamonix (Le Mont K95)	N _{237}	(Austria) Martin Koch	(Austria) R. Schwarzenberger	(Austria) Stefan Kaiser
380	27	24 February 2001	(United States) Ishpeming (Suicide Hill K90)	N _{238}	(Finland) Lassi Huuskonen	(Slovenia) Robert Kranjec	(Finland) Janne Ylijärvi
381	28	25 February 2001	(France) Chamonix (Le Mont K95)	N _{239}	(Austria) Stefan Kaiser	(Norway) Morten Ågheim	(Austria) R. Schwarzenberger
		25 February 2001	(United States) Ishpeming (Suicide Hill K90)	N _{cnx}	cancelled due to strong wind		
382	29	3 March 2001	(Poland) Zakopane (Wielka Krokiew K120)	L _{141}	(Austria) Stefan Kaiser	(Norway) Morten Ågheim	(Norway) Jostein Smeby
383	30	4 March 2001	(Poland) Zakopane (Wielka Krokiew K120)	L _{142}	(Austria) Stefan Kaiser	(Germany) Michael Neumayer	(Norway) Morten Ågheim
384	31	9 March 2001	(Norway) Vikersund (Vikersundbakken K90)	N _{240}	(Finland) Toni Nieminen	(Netherlands) Ingemar Mayr	(Austria) Bernhard Metzler (Norway) Frode Håre
385	32	10 March 2001	(Norway) Vikersund (Vikersundbakken K90)	N _{241}	(Austria) Bernhard Metzler (Japan) Yukitaka Fukita		(Austria) Markus Eigentler
386	33	10 March 2001	(Czech Republic) Harrachov (Čerťák K120/90)	L _{143}	(Czech Republic) Jaroslav Sakala	(Poland) Łukasz Kruczek	(Czech Republic) Jan Matura
387	34	11 March 2001	(Czech Republic) Harrachov (Čerťák K120/90)	N _{242}	(Czech Republic) Jaroslav Sakala	(Czech Republic) Michal Doležal	(Slovakia) Matej Uram (Poland) Łukasz Kruczek
388	35	13 March 2001	(Norway) Våler (Gjerdrumsbakken K90)	N _{243}	(Norway) Morten Solem	(Norway) Daniel Forfang	(Norway) Kjell Erik Sagbakken (Norway) Morten Ågheim
389	36	14 March 2001	(Japan) Zaō (Yamagata K90)	N _{244}	(Japan) Jin'ya Nishikata	(Finland) Kimmo Yliriesto	(Japan) Katsutoshi Chiba
390	37	15 March 2001	(Japan) Zaō (Yamagata K90)	N _{245}	(Japan) Katsutoshi Chiba	(Finland) Kimmo Yliriesto	(Austria) Florian Liegl
391	38	16 March 2001	(Sweden) Örnsköldsvik (Paradiskullen K90)	N _{246}	(Austria) Bernhard Metzler	(Finland) Akseli Lajunen	(Sweden) Emil Westberg
392	39	17 March 2001	(Sweden) Örnsköldsvik (Paradiskullen K90)	N _{247}	(Finland) Akseli Lajunen	(Norway) Morten Solem	(Germany) Kai Bracht
393	40	18 March 2001	(Sweden) Hede (Hedebacken K90)	N _{248}	(Norway) Morten Solem	(Japan) Masayuki Satō	(Norway) Morten Ågheim
		25 March 2001	(Germany) Ruhpolding (Große Zirmbergschanze K120)	L _{cnx}	cancelled due to lack of snow		
10th FIS Continental Cup Overall (7 July 2000 – 18 March 2001)					(Finland) Akseli Lajunen	(Germany) Christoph Grillhösl	(Finland) Lassi Huuskonen

==== Overall ====
Rank	after 40 events	Points
1	(Finland) Akseli Lajunen	929
2	(Germany) Christoph Grillhösl	758
3	(Finland) Lassi Huuskonen	664
4	(Germany) Kai Bracht	662
5	(Austria) Bernhard Metzler	590
6	(Germany) Georg Späth	583
7	(Slovenia) Robert Kranjec	569
8	(Finland) Tami Kiuru	557
9	(Austria) Manuel Fettner	525
10	(Japan) Sōta Okamura	518

== Team events ==
Team events in the CC history

Total	L	N	Winners	Competition
3	2	1	1	Men's team

after men's LH team event in Planica (18 February 2001)

=== Calendar ===
All	No.	Date	Place (Hill)	Size	Winner	Second	Third
Men's team
1	1	26 August 2000	(Germany) Winterberg (Sankt-Georg-Sprungschanze K80)	N _{001}	Austria Thomas Hörl; Manuel Fettner; Stefan Thurnbichler; Stefan Kaiser	Czech Republic Jakub Janda; Jakub Hlava; Jakub Sucháček; Jaroslav Sakala	Finland Teemu Pääkkönen; Jussi Hautamäki; Akseli Lajunen; Toni Nieminen
2	2	10 February 2001	(Germany) Titisee-Neustadt (Hochfirstschanze K120)	L _{001}	Austria Reinhard Schwarzenberger; Manuel Fettner; Martin Koch; Stefan Kaiser	Germany Frank Reichel; Christof Duffner; Hansjörg Jäkle; Georg Späth	Slovenia Rok Benkovič; Simon Podrebršek; Primož Pikl; Grega Podržaj
3	3	18 February 2001	(Slovenia) Planica (Bloudkova velikanka K120)	L _{002}	Austria Markus Eigentler; Manuel Fettner; Florian Liegl; Martin Koch	Germany Roland Audenrieth; Christof Duffner; Hansjörg Jäkle; Georg Späth	Slovenia Miha Rihtar; Simon Podrebršek; Gašper Čavlovič; Primož Peterka
		24 March 2001	(Germany) Ruhpolding (Große Zirmbergschanze K120)	L _{cnx}	cancelled due to lack of snow		

== Europa Cup vs. Continental Cup ==
- Last two Europa Cup seasons (1991/92 and 1992/93) are recognized as first two Continental Cup seasons by International Ski Federation (FIS), although Continental Cup under this name officially started first season in 1993/94 season.

== See also ==
- 2000–01 FIS World Cup
- 2000 FIS Grand Prix
