= Králíky (disambiguation) =

Králíky is a town in the Pardubice Region, Czech Republic.

Králíky or Králiky may also refer to places:

- Králíky (Hradec Králové District), a municipality and village in the Hradec Králové Region, Czech Republic
- Králiky, a municipality and village in the Banská Bystrica Region, Slovakia

== See also ==
- Králík
