= Wurmberg Ski Jumps =

Sports venue in the Harz, Lower Saxony, Germany

Coordinates: 51°45′22.39″N 10°37′09.97″E

Wurmberg Ski Jump Wurmbergschanze
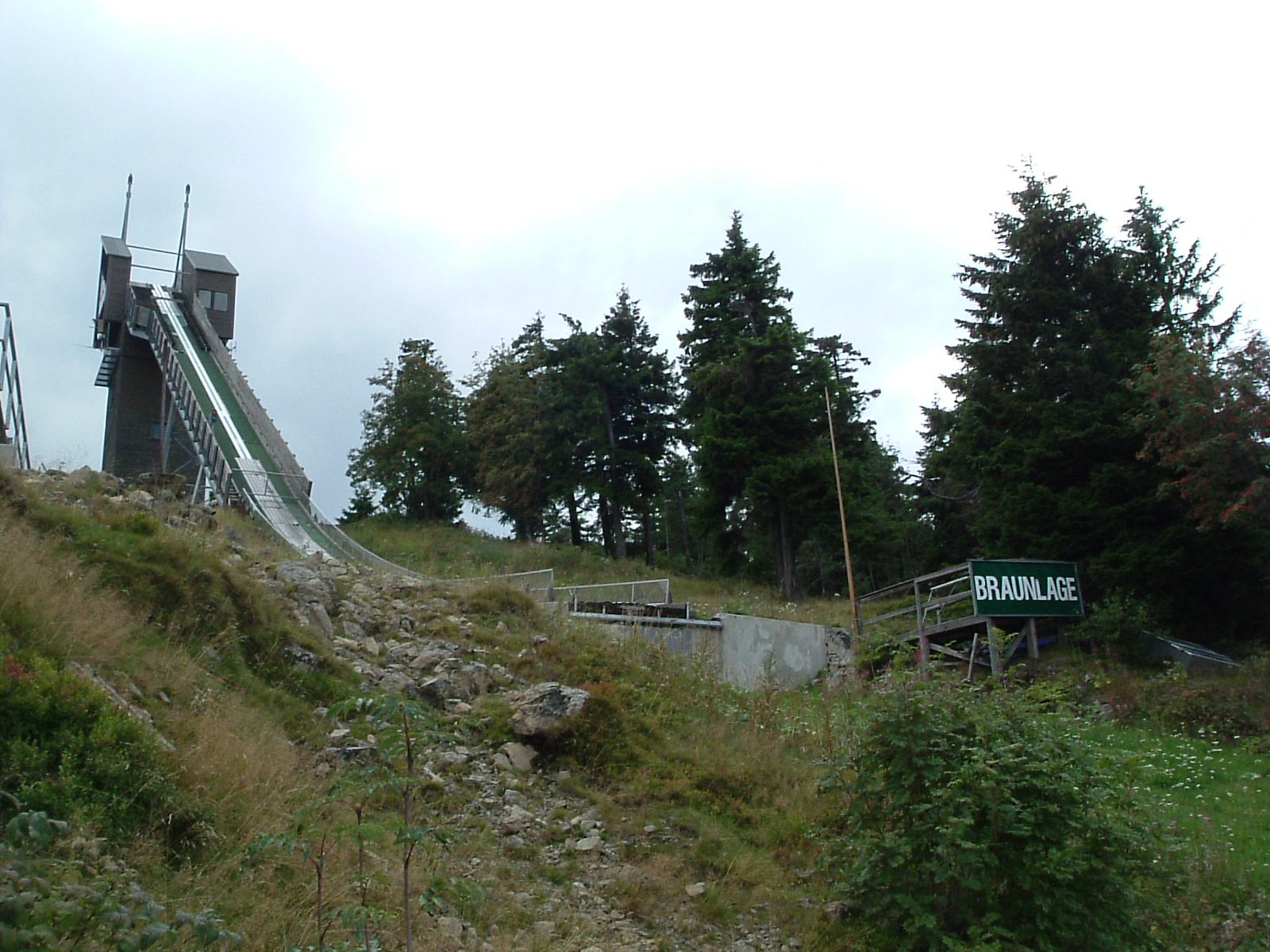
- Location: Braunlage; Germany
- Operator: WSV Braunlage
- Opened: 1922
- Renovated: 1951, 1984, 1991, 2002
- Closed: Aug 2014

Size
- K–point: 90 m
- Hill size: HS 100
- Hill record: 101.0 m Morten Solem (NOR) (2003)
- Spectator capacity: 5000

The Wurmberg ski jumps were a group of ski jumps in the Harz, near the town of Braunlage in Lower Saxony, central Germany.

== Wurmberg Ski Jump ==
The Wurmberg Ski Jump (German: Wurmbergschanze) was the largest jump in the Harz and is located at the summit of the Wurmberg.

It was built in 1922 as a 40 metre jump. During the Cold War there were ski jumping competitions here even though the Inner German Border with the former East Germany lay only a few metres beyond the landing area. In 1951 the 40 metre jump was converted. It was upgraded in 1984 into an 80 metre jump. In 1991 it was extended into an 83 metre jump. During the last rebuilding of the jump in 2001/2002 it was completely replaced and upgraded into a 90 metre jump. The new metal inrun (heatable), with glass and ceramic lamination, offered all jumpers the same conditions down the run. Starting in 1996, when there was enough snow, the FIS held its annual international ski jumping competition, the Continental Cup, here. In August 2014 it was dismantled due to advanced rust in the steel framework which had made it unsafe to use. It was not replaced; instead an observation tower has been built on the site.

=== Ski jump records ===
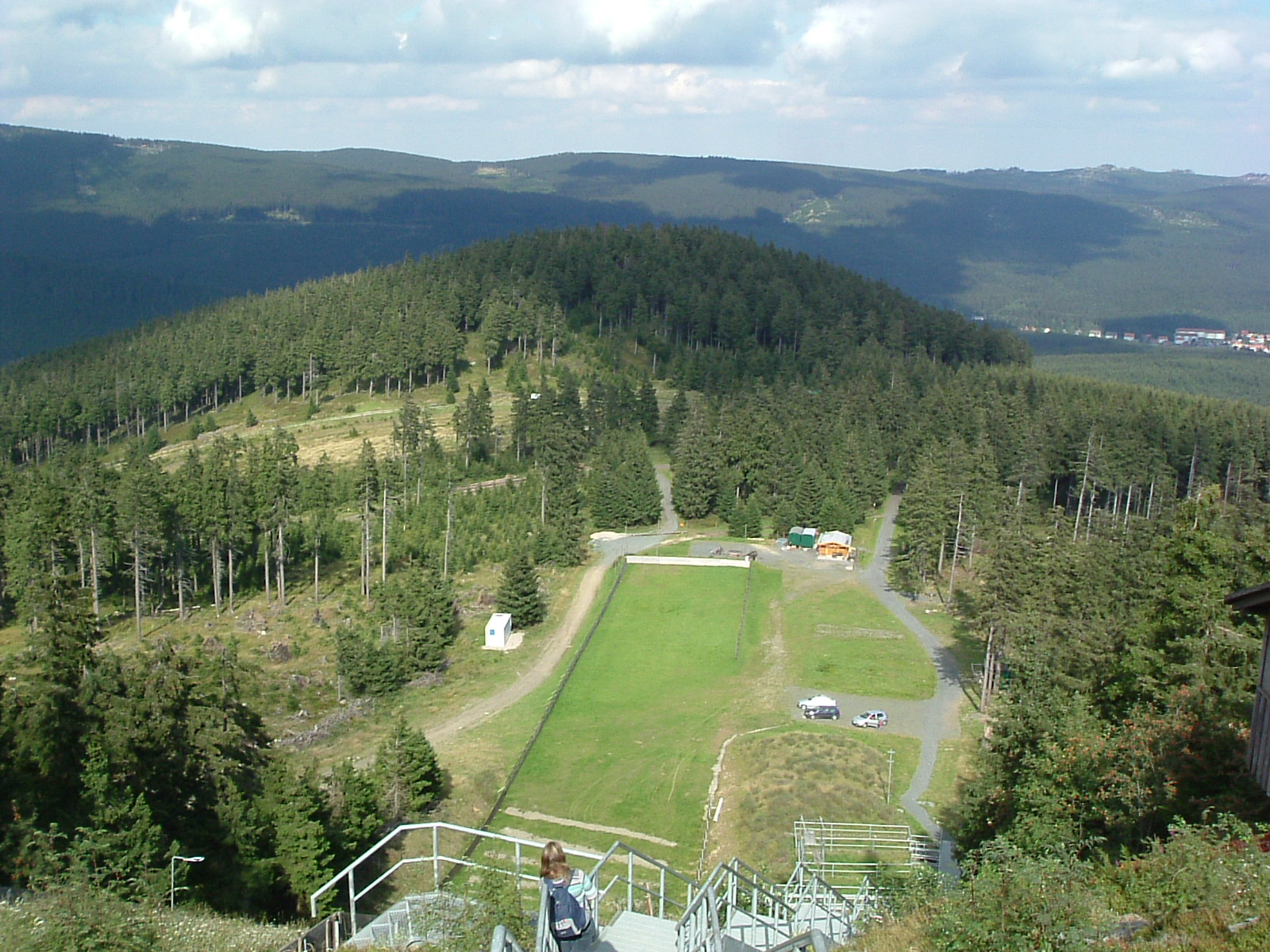
Outrun of the Wurmberg Ski Jump

Year	Name	Distance
1923	Sepp Adolph (GER) (Riesengebirge)	43,0 m
1928	Mölbach-Nielsen (NOR); Franz Leodolter (AUT)	52,0 m 53,5 m
1952	Helmut Oberländer (FRG); Josef Kleisl (FRG); Toni Brutscher (FRG)	63,5 m 67,0 m 67,0 m
1960	Max Bolkart (FRG)	74,5 m
1962	Helmut Wegscheider (FRG)	74,5 m
1978	Peter Leitner (FRG)	81,0 m
1995	Kai Bracht (GER)	88,0 m
1997	Jaroslav Kahánek (CZE)	90,5 m
2000	Janne Ylijärvi (FIN)	91,5 m
2002	Jörg Ritzerfeld (GER); Michael Neumayer (GER)	92,0 m 98,0 m
2003	Bine Zupan (SLO); Michael Möllinger (GER); Morten Solem (NOR)	98,0 m 99,5 m 101,0 m

== Brockenweg Ski Jumps ==
At the foot of the Wurmberg are the Brockenweg Ski Jumps which host regional and international competitions.

== See also ==
- List of ski jumping hills
