= Trondhjems SK =

Trondhjems SK may refer to:

- Trondhjems SK (skating)
- Trondhjems SK (skiing)
