= Králík =

Králík (feminine: Králíková) is a Czech surname. Králik (feminine: Králiková) is a Slovak surname. They both mean 'rabbit'. Notable people with the surname include:

- Csaba Králik (born 1992), Slovak football player
- František Králík (1942–1974), Czech handball player
- Jan Králík (born 1987), Czech footballer
- Jean-Louis Kralik (1813–1892), French botanist
- Jiří Králík (born 1952), Czech ice hockey player
- Juraj Králik (1926–2012), Slovak diplomat and writer
- Ľudmila Králiková (born 1953), Czech basketball player
- Martin Králik (born 1995), Slovak footballer
- Mathilde Kralik (1857–1944), Austrian composer

== See also ==
- Králíky
- Králiky
