= Kim-Roar Hansen =

Norwegian ski jumper

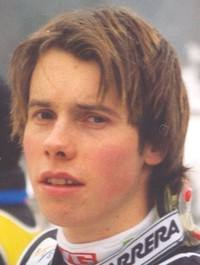
- Hansen in 2003

Personal information
- Born: 24 March 1984 (age 42) Drammen, Norway

Sport
- Sport: Skiing
- Club: Lier IL

World Cup career
- Seasons: 2002–2004
- Indiv. podiums: 0
- Indiv. wins: 0
- Updated on 22 March 2015

Kim-Roar Hansen (born 24 March 1984) is a Norwegian former ski jumper. At World Cup level he finished five times in the top 15, with a twelfth place at Trondheim on 8 December 2002 as his best result.

He made his Four Hills Tournament debut in December 2002, but did not progress past the head-to-head qualification against Kazuyoshi Funaki. He was a candidate to be selected for the 2003 World Championships, but fell through at the 2003 national championships with 8th and 10th places, and was ultimately not selected.

In 2004, he took his first national championship medal, a bronze medal in the team competition. However, as he had gone out to town during a World Cup weekend in Kuopio, he was barred from competing in the Vikersundbakken COC race. He was accepted as a trial jumper, and with a measured length of 212 metres he surpassed the hill record of Andreas Goldberger, but only racers could set hill records. Following the Vikersund incident, lack of motivation and desired results, Hansen decided to retire from ski jumping in the summer of 2004.
