= Brockenweg Ski Jumps =

Ski Jump in Braunlage, Germany

Brockenweg Ski Jump Brockenwegschanze
- Location: Braunlage; Germany
- Operator: WSV Braunlage
- Opened: 1922
- Renovated: 1951, 1984, 1991, 2002

Size
- K–point: K 70
- Hill record: 75.0 m Germany (1993)
- Other jumps: K 7, K 14 K 40, K 58

At the foot of the Wurmberg is the Brockenweg Ski Jump (51°44′24.81″N 10°36′47.55″E). This has two training jumps (K 7 and K 15), two artificial jumps (K 40 and K 58) and the derelict winter jump (K 70). The Braunlage Winter Sports Club (WSV Braunlage) hosts regional and international ski jumping here. All the jumps apart from K 70 are laid with mats.

== Ski jump records ==
Jump	Year	Name	Distance
K 70	1993	Jörg Büttner (GER)	75 m
K 58	2004; 2005; 2007	Marcel Krüger (GER); Roman Koudelka (CZE); Adrian Brück (GER)	61 m 63,5 m 65,5 m
K 40	1999; 2003; 2005; 2008	Frank Eppers (GER); Sascha Kniss (GER); Lukas Beyer (GER); Carlo Kühnel (GER)	44,5 m 45 m

== Wurmberg Ski Jump ==
Near the summit of the Wurmberg is the Wurmberg Ski Jump which is a K90 and hosts the Continental Cup organised by FIS.
