= Králíky (Hradec Králové District) =

- Municipality
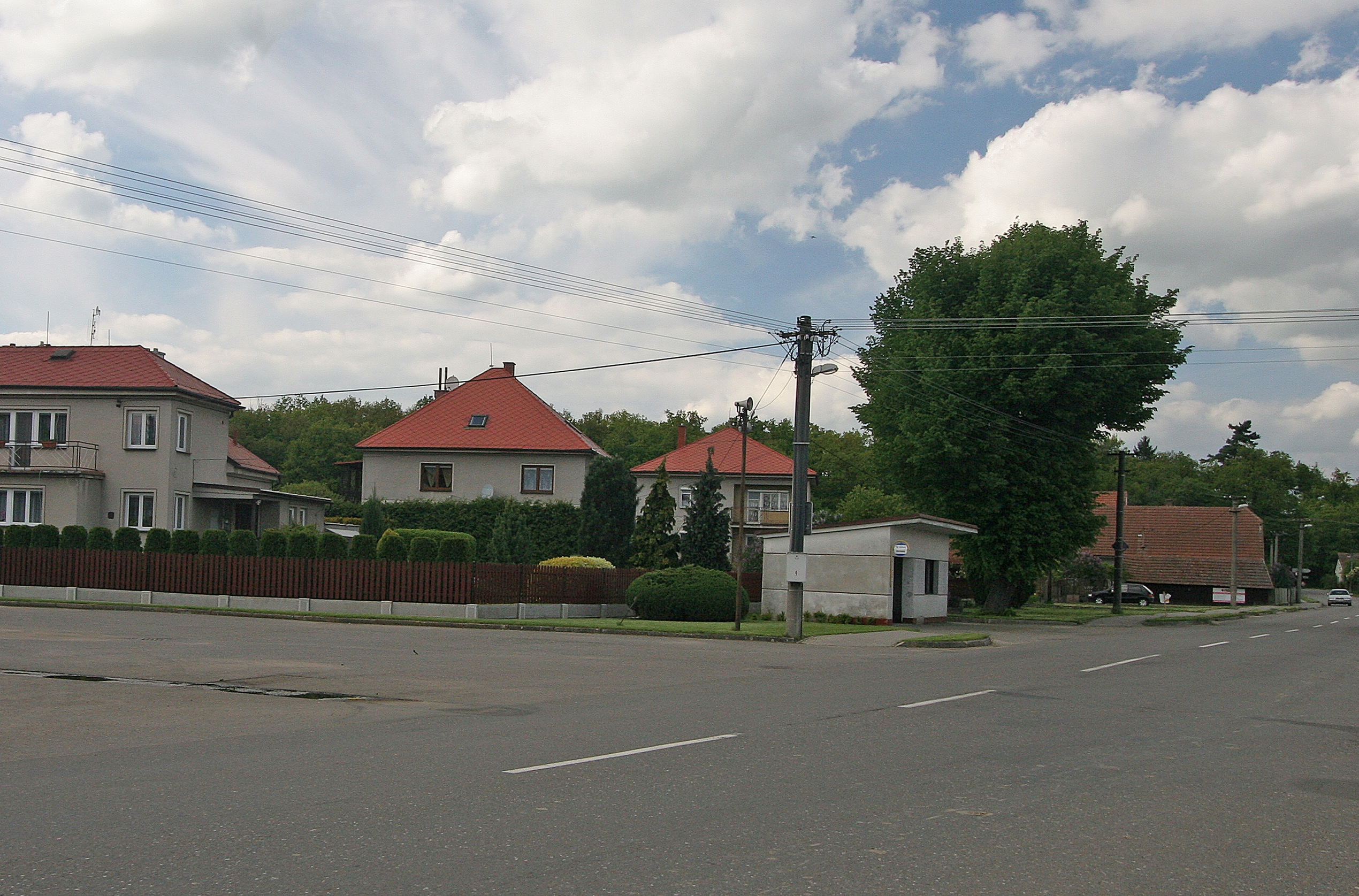
- Crossroads in the centre of Králíky

- Location in the Czech Republic
- Coordinates: 50°15′34″N 15°32′12″E
- Country: Czech Republic
- Region: Hradec Králové
- District: Hradec Králové
- First mentioned: 1635

Area
  - Total: 9.70 km^{2} (3.75 sq mi)
- Elevation: 235 m (771 ft)

Population (2026-01-01)
  - Total: 409
  - Density: 42.2/km^{2} (109/sq mi)
- Time zone: UTC+1 (CET)
  - Summer (DST): UTC+2 (CEST)
- Postal codes: 503 15, 504 01
- Website: ou.kraliky.info

Králíky is a municipality and village in Hradec Králové District in the Hradec Králové Region of the Czech Republic. It has about 400 inhabitants.

== Administrative division ==
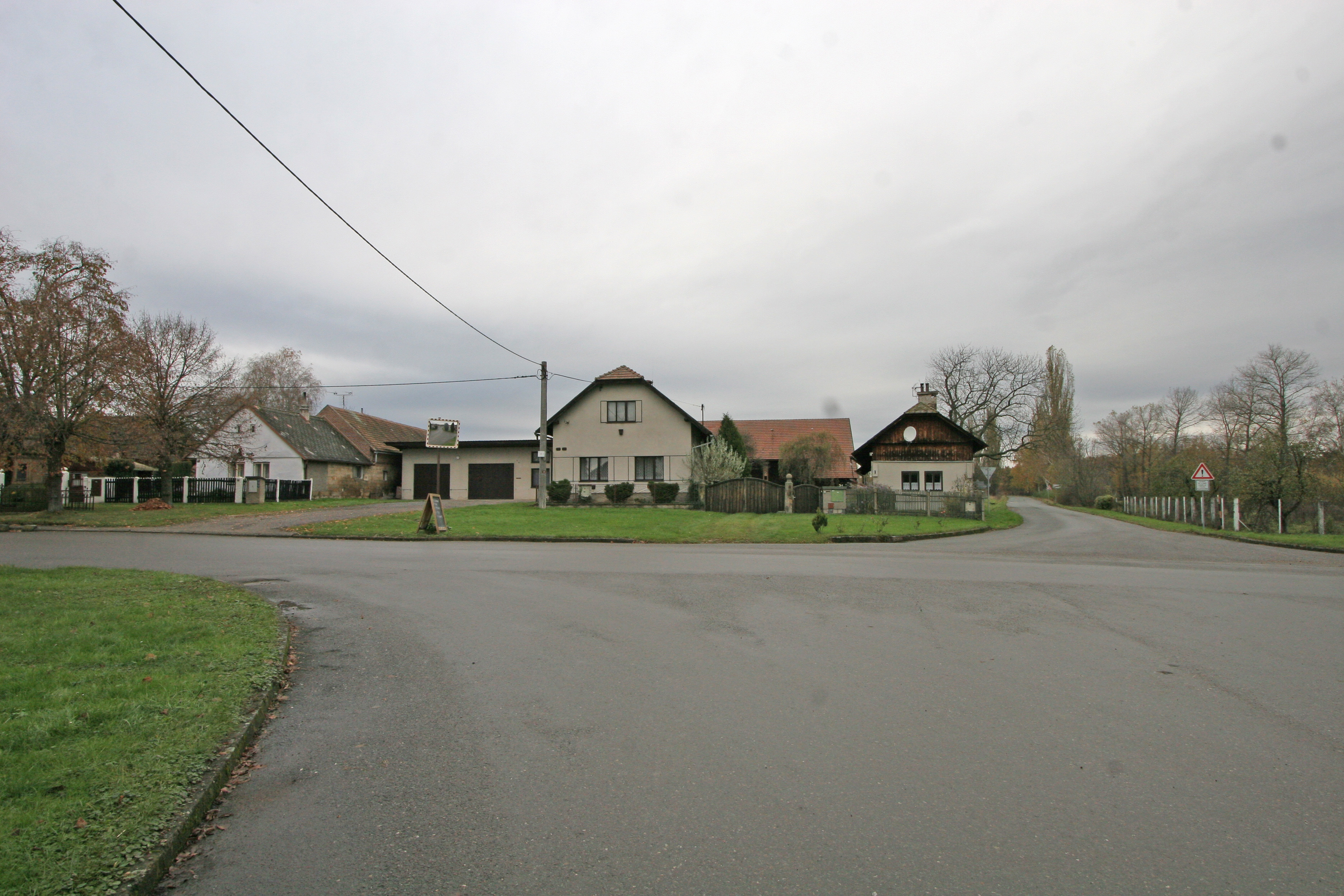
Centre of Podoliby

Králíky consists of four municipal parts (in brackets population according to the 2021 census):

- Králíky (189)
- Chmelovice (41)
- Podoliby (88)
- Řehoty (54)

== Etymology ==
The name Králíky is derived from the surname Králík, meaning "the village of Králíks (Králík family)".

== Geography ==
Králíky is located about 20 kilometres (12 mi) west of Hradec Králové. It lies in a flat agricultural landscape in the East Elbe Table. The stream Králický potok flows through the municipality.

== History ==
The first written mention of Králíky is from 1635, when it was called Kralice. The village was established in the 16th century, but was devastated. In 1654, it was consisted of 13 cottages. It was restored in 1686, when it was acquired by Břevnov Monastery and resettled by Germans.

Řehoty could have been established in the 11th or 12th century. The first written mention of Řehoty is from 1549, when it was sold by the Pernštejn family to the town of Nový Bydžov. In 1623, the village was desolate and the land was annexed to Prasek. In 1786, three families came and founded a new settlement.

The first written mention of Podoliby is from 1363. There were only two homesteads and nine cottages until 1654. It belonged to Havel Zvířetický of Vartenberk who sold the town of Nový Bydžov, including the attached villages, to Vilém II of Pernštejn. Later it was in possession of Kryštof Erazim Sommerfeld, who sold Podoliby in 1623 to Albrecht von Wallenstein. The village was destroyed during the Thirty Years' War, but it did not cease to exist. It expanded again in the 18th century and a school was built there in 1882.

Chmelovice was founded in 1786. Four years later, there were already 11 houses. In 1835 there lived 93 inhabitants.

Chmelovice and Podoliby were separate municipalities until 1961, when they were joined to Králíky. Řehoty was a part of Prasek until 1980, and since 1 March 1980 it has been a part of Králíky.

== Demographics ==
Historical population

Year	Pop.	±%
1869	675	—
1880	683	+1.2%
1890	699	+2.3%
1900	783	+12.0%
1910	779	−0.5%

Year	Pop.	±%
1921	728	−6.5%
1930	700	−3.8%
1950	484	−30.9%
1961	448	−7.4%
1970	385	−14.1%

Year	Pop.	±%
1980	410	+6.5%
1991	401	−2.2%
2001	396	−1.2%
2011	376	−5.1%
2021	372	−1.1%

Source: Censuses

== Transport ==
There are no railways or major roads passing through the municipality.

== Sights ==
The only protected cultural monument in the municipality is the former manor house in Chmelovice. Its present appearance is the result of the Empire reconstruction in the 19th century.
