= 2000 FIS Ski Jumping Grand Prix =

International ski jumping competition

Grand Prix 2000
Winners
- Overall: (Finland) Janne Ahonen
- Nations Cup: Finland

Competitions
- Venues: 6
- Individual: 8
- Team: 1
- Cancelled: 1

The 2000 FIS Ski Jumping Grand Prix was the 7th Summer Grand Prix season in ski jumping on plastic. Season began on 5 August 2000 in Hinterzarten, Germany and ended on 3 September 2000 in Sapporo.

Other competitive circuits this season included the World Cup and Continental Cup.

== Calendar ==
=== Men ===
Num	Season	Date	Place	Hill	Size	Winner	Second	Third	Yellow bib
29	1	6 August 2000	(Germany) Hinterzarten	Rothaus-Schanze K95	NH	(Austria) Andreas Widhölzl	(Austria) Martin Höllwarth	(Japan) Noriaki Kasai	(Austria) Andreas Widhölzl
30	2	9 August 2000	(Finland) Kuopio	Puijo K120	LH	(Finland) Janne Ahonen	(Japan) Noriaki Kasai	(Finland) Matti Hautamäki	(Finland) Janne Ahonen
31	3	12 August 2000	(Austria) Villach	Villacher Alpenarena K90	NH	(Finland) Janne Ahonen	(Finland) Matti Hautamäki	(Japan) Hideharu Miyahira	(Finland) Janne Ahonen
32	4	14 August 2000	(France) Courchevel	Tremplin du Praz K120	LH	(Finland) Janne Ahonen (Japan) Hideharu Miyahira		(Germany) Martin Schmitt	(Finland) Janne Ahonen
33	5	26 August 2000	(Japan) Hakuba	Olympic Ski Jumps K120	LH	(Finland) Matti Hautamäki	(Finland) Janne Ahonen	(Japan) Noriaki Kasai	(Finland) Janne Ahonen
34	6	27 August 2000	(Japan) Hakuba	Olympic Ski Jumps K120	LH	(Finland) Janne Ahonen	(Finland) Risto Jussilainen	(Finland) Matti Hautamäki	(Finland) Janne Ahonen
		30 August 2000	(South Korea) Muju	Muju Resort K120	LH	cancelled			
35	7	2 September 2000	(Japan) Sapporo	Okurayama K120	LH	(Japan) Hideharu Miyahira	(Finland) Janne Ahonen	(Japan) Kazuyoshi Funaki	(Finland) Janne Ahonen
36	8	3 September 2000	(Japan) Sapporo	Okurayama K120	LH	(Finland) Janne Ahonen	(Norway) Henning Stensrud	(Norway) Lasse Ottesen	(Finland) Janne Ahonen

=== Men's team ===
Num	Season	Date	Place	Hill	Size	Winner	Second	Third	Yellow bib
4	1	5 August 2000	(Germany) Hinterzarten	Rothaus-Schanze K95	NH	Finland Risto Jussilainen; Jani Soininen; Ville Kantee; Janne Ahonen	Japan Kazuya Yoshioka; Kazuyoshi Funaki; Hideharu Miyahira; Noriaki Kasai	Germany Sven Hannawald; Michael Uhrmann; Frank Löffler; Martin Schmitt	Finland

== Standings ==
=== Overall ===
Rank	after 8 events	Points
1	(Finland) Janne Ahonen	705
2	(Finland) Matti Hautamäki	480
3	(Japan) Hideharu Miyahira	438
4	(Japan) Noriaki Kasai	285
5	(Finland) Risto Jussilainen	264

=== Nations Cup ===
Rank	after 9 events	Points
1	Finland	1824
2	Japan	1208
3	Norway	983
4	Austria	921
5	Germany	871
