= Trondhjems SK (skiing) =

Ski club in Trondheim, Norway

Trondhjems Skiklub is a Norwegian sports club from Trondheim, founded in 1884. It has sections for cross-country skiing, ski jumping, and snowboarding.

World Cup ski jumper Morten Solem was a member of the club.
