= Sota Okamura =

Japanese ski jumper (born 1977)

Personal information
- Born: 4 February 1977 (age 49) Sapporo, Japan ()

Sport
- Sport: Skiing
- Club: Snow Brand Ski Team

World Cup career
- Seasons: 1996, 2001–2003
- Indiv. podiums: 0
- Indiv. wins: 0

Sota Okamura (born 4 February 1977) is a Japanese ski jumper.

In the World Cup his highest place was number 19 from January 2001 in Sapporo.
