= Christoph Grillhösl =

German ski jumper (born 1978)

Personal information
- Born: 16 November 1978 (age 47)

Sport
- Sport: Skiing
- Club: WSV DJK Rastbuechl

World Cup career
- Seasons: 2001
- Indiv. wins: 0
- Updated on 23 December 2007

Christoph Grillhösl (born 16 November 1978) is a retired German ski jumper.

He finished second overall in the 2000-2001 Continental Cup. In the World Cup he participated in one race, finishing 27th in Willingen in February 2001.
