= 2002 FIS Ski Jumping Grand Prix =

International ski jumping competition

Ski Jumping Grand Prix 2002
Winners
- Overall: (Austria) Andreas Widhölzl
- Nations Cup: Austria

Competitions
- Venues: 4
- Individual: 6

The 2002 FIS Ski Jumping Grand Prix was the 9th Summer Grand Prix season in ski jumping on plastic. Season began on 10 August 2002 in Hinterzarten, Germany and ended on 14 September 2002 in Innsbruck, Austria.

== Calendar ==
=== Men ===
No.	Season	Date	Place	Hill	Size	Winner	Second	Third	Yellow bib	Det.
44	1	10 Aug 2002	(Germany) Hinterzarten	Rothaus-Schanze K-95	NH	(Austria) Andreas Widhölzl	(Finland) Janne Ahonen	(Finland) Matti Hautamäki	(Austria) Andreas Widhölzl	
45	2	11 Aug 2002	(Germany) Hinterzarten	Rothaus-Schanze K-95	NH	(Austria) Andreas Widhölzl	(United States) Clint Jones	(Austria) Martin Höllwarth	(Austria) Andreas Widhölzl	
46	3	14 Aug 2002	(France) Courchevel	Tremplin du Praz K-120	LH	(Austria) Andreas Widhölzl	(United States) Clint Jones	(Slovenia) Robert Kranjec	(Austria) Andreas Widhölzl	
47	4	6 Sep 2002	(Finland) Lahti	Salpausselkä K-116 (night)	LH	(Austria) Andreas Widhölzl	(Finland) Janne Ahonen	(Austria) Martin Koch	(Austria) Andreas Widhölzl	
48	5	7 Sep 2002	(Finland) Lahti	Salpausselkä K-116	LH	(Austria) Andreas Widhölzl	(Finland) Janne Ahonen	(Austria) Martin Höllwarth	(Austria) Andreas Widhölzl	
49	6	14 Sep 2002	(Austria) Innsbruck	Bergisel K-120	LH	(Austria) Martin Höllwarth	(United States) Clint Jones	(Austria) Andreas Widhölzl	(Austria) Andreas Widhölzl	

== Standings ==
=== Overall ===
Rank	Ski jumper	Points
1	(Austria) Andreas Widhölzl	560
2	(United States) Clint Jones	354
3	(Finland) Janne Ahonen	338
4	(Austria) Martin Höllwarth	306
5	(Austria) Martin Koch	244

- After 6 events.

=== Nations Cup ===
Rank	Country	Points
1	Austria	1442
2	Finland	703
3	United States	426
4	Norway	382
5	Slovenia	354

- After 6 events.

== See also ==
- 2002–03 World Cup
