= Csaba Králik =

Slovak footballer

Personal information
- Date of birth: 24 June 1992 (age 34)
- Place of birth: Czechoslovakia
- Position: Midfielder

Team information
- Current team: FC ŠTK 1914 Šamorín
- Number: 14

Youth career
- TJ Družstevník Pribeta
- Dunajská Streda

Senior career*
Years	Team	Apps	(Gls)
2011–2012	Dunajská Streda	3	(0)
2012–	Szigetszentmiklósi TK		
–2014	Diosdi TC		
2014–2015	Komárno		
2015–	Veľký Meder		
2015	→ Gabčíkovo (loan)		
2016–	→ Šamorín (loan)	3	(0)
- * Club domestic league appearances and goals as of 24 August 2016

Csaba Králik (born 24 June 1992) is a Slovak football midfielder of Hungarian ethnicity who currently plays for FC ŠTK 1914 Šamorín.
