= Shingo Ueno =

Japanese ski jumper

Personal information
- Born: 12 November 1973 (age 52)

Sport
- Sport: Skiing
- Club: NTT Higashinihon Hokkaido

World Cup career
- Seasons: 2002-2003, 2006
- Indiv. podiums: 0
- Indiv. wins: 0

Shingo Ueno (born 12 November 1973) is a Japanese ski jumper.

In the World Cup he finished once among the top 15, recording a thirteenth place from January 2006 in Sapporo. He made his World Cup debut in January 2002, competing in two races that season, and three races in 2003. In 2003 and 2003 he also finished three times among the top 6 in the Continental Cup.
