= Christoph Kreuzer =

Dutch ski jumper (born 1982)

Christoph Kreuzer (born 9 September 1982) is a Dutch former ski jumper. He holds the Dutch national record with 162 metres.

Kreuzer trained in Villach. He later started for the Villach and Netherlands Ski Federation. On January 2, 2002, he started for the first time in his adopted home of Austria jumping in the Ski Jumping Continental Cup 2001/02 in Innsbruck . After three luckless competitions in Austria on January 19, 2002, he succeeded for the first time in the COC points. So he finished the jumping in the French Courchevel in 22nd place. Then, he was in the squad for the World Cup Jumping on January 26, 2002 in Sapporo, Japan. He was able to win the first points here in his first competition of this series and finished the jumping on the 29th place. In the team competition, he was only eleventh with the Dutch team. After one year he did not compete in the World Cup anymore and continued in the Continental Cup. At the Ski Flying World Championships 2002 in Harrachov he was 44th.. At the Nordic World Ski Championships 2003 in the Val di Fiemmehe was on the normal hill 50th. After further jumping in the Continental Cup, he finished his active ski jumping career after jumping on January 18, 2004 in Bischofshofen.

With his personal best of 162 meters, set up in Planica 2002, he holds the Dutch record in ski flying .

He was 50th in the normal hill competition in World Championships 2003 in Val di Fiemme, Italy. His best individual World Cup placement is 29th place from Sapporo 2002. Kreuzer retired in 2005.
