= Isak Grimholm =

Swedish ski jumper

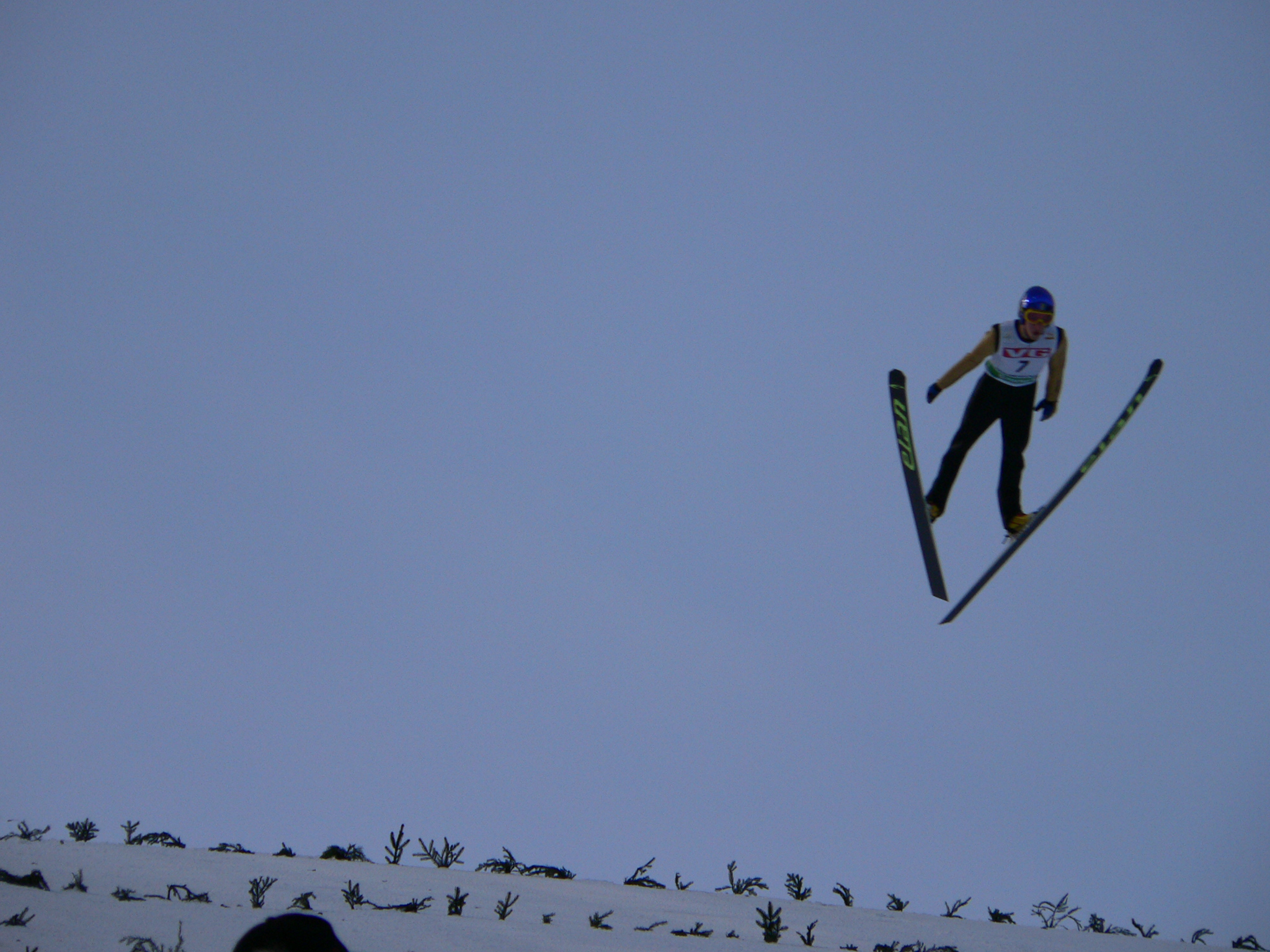
- Grimholm in Oslo, 2005

Personal information
- Nationality: Sweden
- Born: 25 March 1985 (age 41) Örnsköldsvik, Sweden

Sport
- Sport: Skiing

World Cup career
- Seasons: 2003–2010

Achievements and titles
- Personal bests: 207.5 m (681 ft); Planica
- Updated on 27 March 2016

Isak Grimholm (born 25 March 1985) is a Swedish former ski jumper.

He made his Continental Cup debut in August 2002 in Marikollen, and his best result is a victory from Iron Mountain in February 2007. He participated in the FIS Junior World Ski Championships in 2002 and 2003. He made his World Cup debut in December 2002 in Trondheim, finishing 46th, and collected his first World Cup points with a 27th place in February 2007 in Planica. He has not collected World Cup points since. From Planica he holds the Swedish record in ski flying with 207.5 meters (681 ft).
