= Stefan Pieper =

German ski jumper

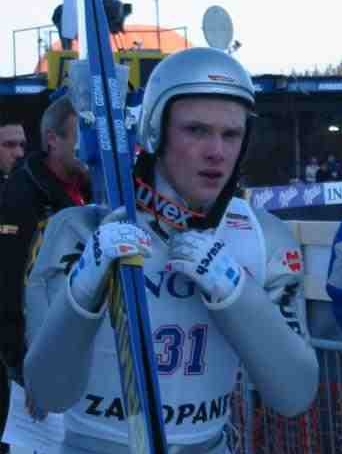

Personal information
- Born: 1 April 1982 (age 44) Winterberg, North Rhine-Westphalia, West Germany

Sport
- Sport: Skiing
- Club: SC Winterberg

World Cup career
- Seasons: 2000-2004
- Indiv. podiums: 0
- Indiv. wins: 0
- Updated on 23 December 2007

Stefan Pieper (born 1 April 1982) is a retired German ski jumper.

In the World Cup he finished once among the top 15, his best result being a seventh place from Sapporo in January 2003.
