= Morten Solem =

Norwegian ski jumper (born 1980)

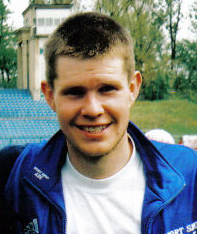

Personal information
- Born: August 5, 1980 (age 45) Trondheim, Norway

Sport
- Sport: Skiing
- Club: Trondhjems SK

World Cup career
- Seasons: 2000–2007

Morten Solem (born 5 August 1980) is a Norwegian former ski jumper who competed from 1999 to 2007. His best results at World Cup level were four top 10 finishes. He also finished second overall in the 2002–03 and 2005–06 Continental Cup seasons.

== Career ==
Hailing from Nardo in Trondheim, he represented the club Trondhjems SK and was coached by Geir Ole Berdal and Bjørn Myrbakken.

In the FIS Ski Jumping World Cup, Solem collected his first points as he finished 16th in November 2000 in Kuopio. He managed to repeat this placement in Oberstdorf in the 2000–01 Four Hills Tournament, before improving to 12th near the end of the season, in the World Cup race on home snow in Granåsen.

He also became Norwegian champion in February 2001, and was selected for the 2001 FIS Nordic World Ski Championships. However, he performed so badly during training that he chose to leave the World Championships.

Solem made his Continental Cup debut in the 2001–02 season, winning a race already in December 2001 in Engelberg. Before the season was over, he had followed with a second place in Gallio and a fourth place in Vikersund. In the 2002–03 Continental Cup season, Solem won two races in Sapporo and Braunlage, and finished second overall.

Solem competed sparingly in the 2001–02 World Cup before returning to the Four Hills Tournament in 2003–04. In January 2004 he recorded a run starting with a 16th place in Liberec, followed by a seventh place on 11 January 2004—his best individual result—and then a 14th, 13th and 11th place in the next races on the circuit.

Between February 2003 and January 2005, also Solem finished top 4 in eleven of the fifteen Continental Cup races he participated in. In the 2004–05 World Cup, he notably finished eighth twice, both in February 2005 in Sapporo.

Another second place overall came in the 2005–06 Continental Cup season, and Solem's last Continental Cup victory came in December 2006 in Engelberg.

His last top 10 placement in the World Cup was an eighth place in January 2007 in Zakopane. In March 2007 he recorded his two final podiums in the Continental Cup. His last World Cup race came the next week in Kuopio (the same city where he made his World Cup debut), followed by his last Continental Cup race in Zakopane.
