= Králiky =

Králiky Királyka
- Municipality
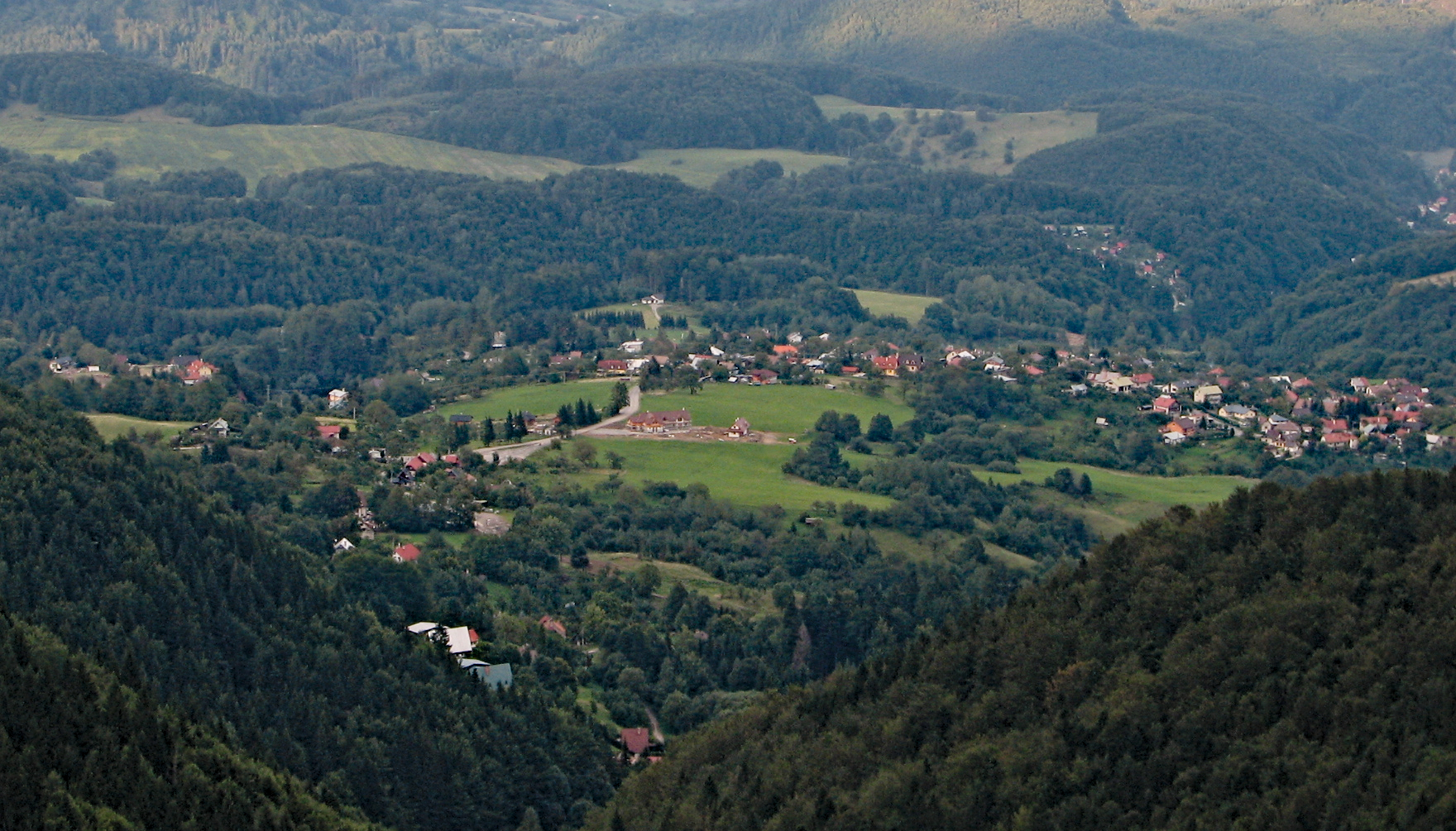

- Flag

- Location of Králiky in the Banská Bystrica Region Location of Králiky in Slovakia
- Coordinates: 48.73°N 19.03°E
- Country: Slovakia
- Region: Banská Bystrica Region
- District: Banská Bystrica District
- First mentioned: 1696

Area
  - Total: 1.64 km^{2} (0.63 sq mi)
- Elevation: 668 m (2,192 ft)

Population (2025)
  - Total: 713
- Time zone: UTC+1 (CET)
  - Summer (DST): UTC+2 (CEST)
- Postal code: 976 34
- Area code: +421 48
- Vehicle registration plate (until 2022): BB
- Website: www.obeckraliky.sk

Králiky (Hungarian: Királyka) is a village and municipality in Banská Bystrica District in the Banská Bystrica Region of central Slovakia.

== History ==
In historical records the village was first mentioned in 1696.

== Geography ==
The municipality lies at an altitude of 668 metres (2,192 ft) and covers an area of 1.64 km^{2} (0.63 sq mi) (2025).

== Population ==
Population statistic (10 years)
| Year | 1995 | 2005 | 2015 | 2025 |
|---|---|---|---|---|
| Count | 457 | 574 | 636 | 713 |
| Difference | | +25.60% | +10.80% | +12.10% |

Population statistic
| Year | 2024 | 2025 |
|---|---|---|
| Count | 712 | 713 |
| Difference | | +0.14% |

It has a population of 713 people (31 December 2025).

=== Ethnicity ===
Census 2021 (1+ %)
| Ethnicity | Number | Fraction |
|---|---|---|
| Slovak | 674 | 97.25% |
| Ukrainian | 9 | 1.29% |
| Total | 693 | |

In year 2021 was 693 people by ethnicity 674 as Slovak, 9 as Ukrainian, 6 as Other, 5 as Not found out, 2 as Czech, 2 as Moravian, 1 as Irish, 1 as Vietnamese, 1 as Rusyn, 1 as Russian, 1 as German, 1 as Hungarian and 1 as Albanian.

Note on population: The difference values of population numbers in the table "Population statistic" and in the sections "Ethnicity" & "Religion" is caused by the use of various statistical methods.

=== Religion ===
Census 2021 (1+ %)
| Religion | Number | Fraction |
|---|---|---|
| Roman Catholic Church | 320 | 46.18% |
| None | 239 | 34.49% |
| Evangelical Church | 98 | 14.14% |
| Greek Catholic Church | 9 | 1.3% |
| Not found out | 8 | 1.15% |
| Eastern Orthodox Church | 7 | 1.01% |
| Total | 693 | |

In year 2021 was 693 people by religion 320 from Roman Catholic Church, 239 from None, 98 from Evangelical Church, 9 from Greek Catholic Church, 8 from Not found out, 7 from Eastern Orthodox Church, 2 from Jehovah's Witnesses, 2 from Islam, 2 from Buddhism, 2 from Baptists Church, 2 from Ad hoc movements, 1 from Calvinist Church and 1 from Other.
