= Michael Möllinger =

German-Swiss ski jumper

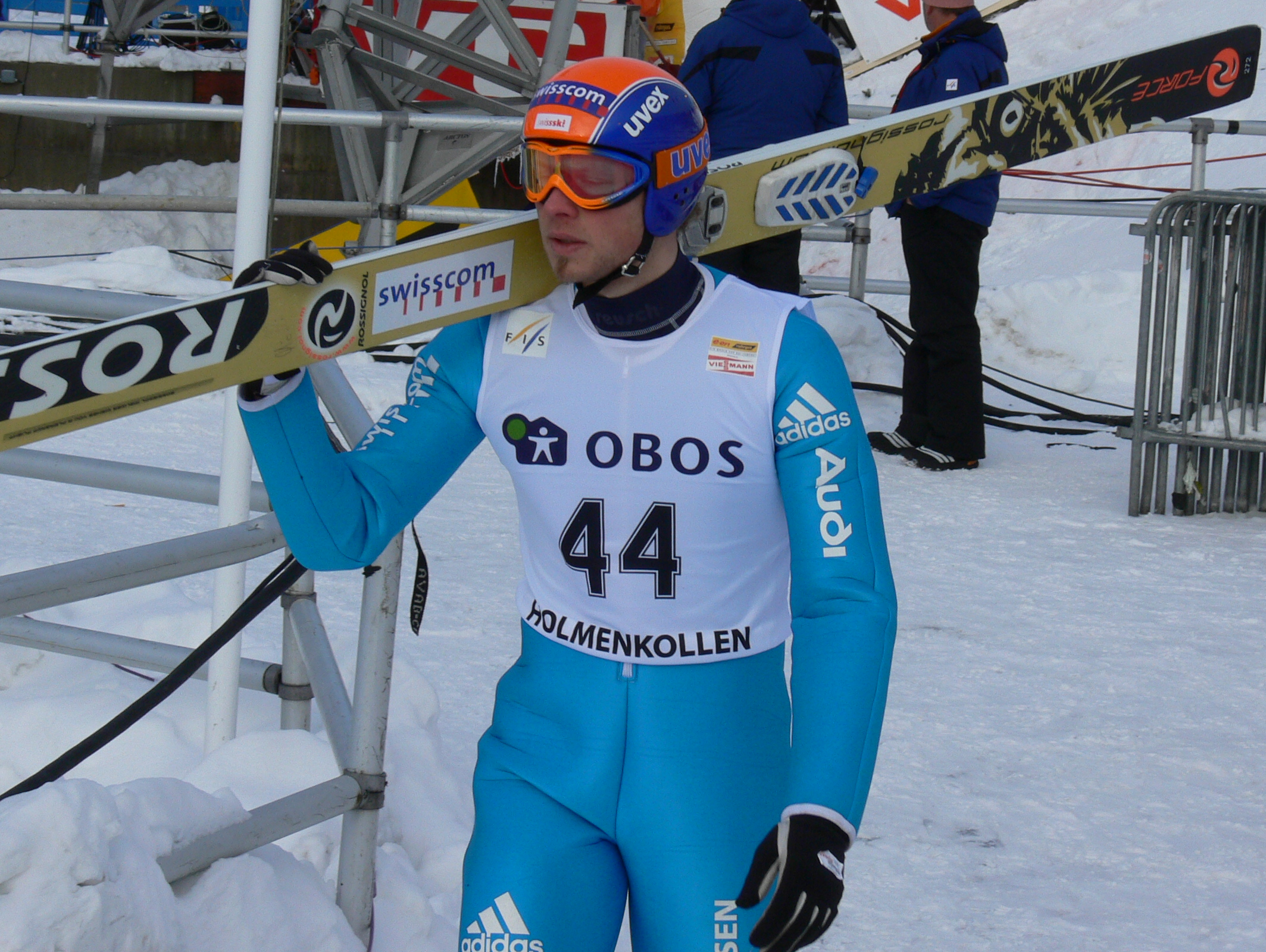
Michael Möllinger

Michael Möllinger (born 25 October 1980 in Titisee-Neustadt) is a German-Swiss former ski jumper who has competed since 2000, representing initially Germany, then Switzerland since 2004. At the 2006 Winter Olympics in Turin, he finished seventh in the team large hill and 13th in both individual hill events.

Möllinger's best finishes at the FIS Nordic World Ski Championships have seventh in the team large hill twice (2005, 2007) and 34th in the individual large hill (2005). At the 2006 Ski-flying World Championships in Kulm, he finished sixth in the team and 24th in the individual events.

Möllinger's best individual World cup career finish was tenth in a large hill event in Finland in 2004. He has two individual career victories in Continental Cup events, both earned in 2003.
