= Clint Jones =

American ski jumper

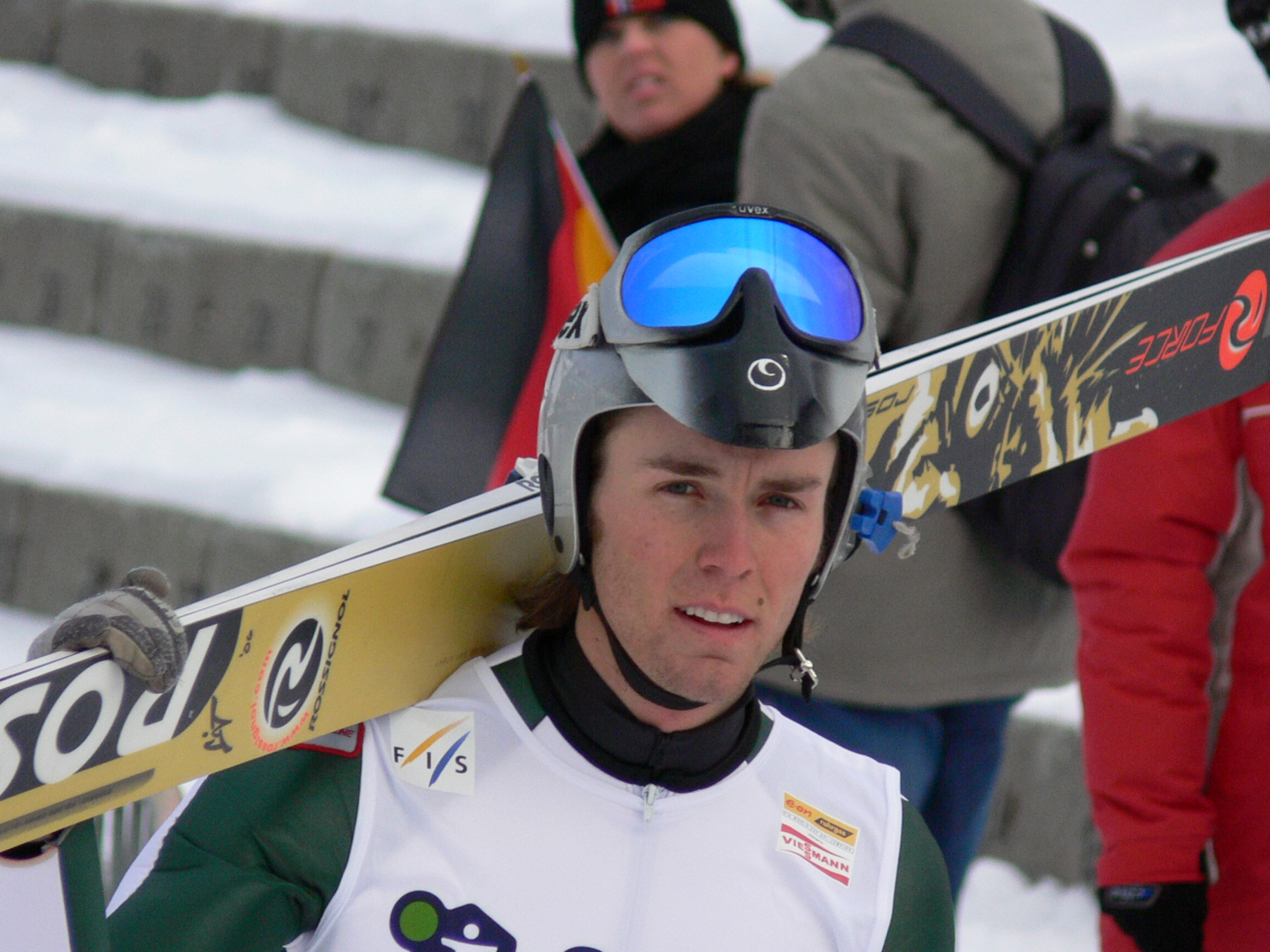

Personal information
- Full name: Clint Jones
- Born: October 5, 1984 (age 41) Monroe, U.S.

Sport
- Sport: Skiing
- Club: Steamboat Springs Winter Sports

World Cup career
- Seasons: 2000–2007
- Indiv. podiums: 0
- Indiv. wins: 0

Clint Jones (born October 5, 1984) is an American former ski jumper, currently residing in Park City, Utah. He participated in both the 2002 and 2006 Winter Olympics, earning his best finish of 42nd in the individual large hill at the 2002 event.

Jones' best finish was 32nd in the individual normal hill both at the 2003 and 2005 FIS Nordic World Ski Championships. He finished 22nd at the 2004 Ski-flying World Championships in Planica.

Jones' best individual World Cup finish was ninth at the large hill event in Kuopio, Finland, on 23 November 2001. He has a total of four individual Continental Cup career victories from 2002 to 2004.
