= Kai Bracht =

German ski jumper

Personal information
- Born: 27 April 1978 (age 48) Eberbach, West Germany

Sport
- Sport: Skiing
- Club: SC Oberstdorf

World Cup career
- Seasons: 2002-2006
- Indiv. wins: 0
- Updated on 23 December 2007

Kai Bracht (born 27 April 1978) is a retired German ski jumper.

In the World Cup he finished three times among the top 30, his best result being a 25th place from Tauplitz in March 2003.
