= 2001–02 FIS Ski Jumping World Cup – Zakopane =

Ski jumping World Cup events held in Zakopane, Poland

Location in Europe

2001–02 FIS Ski Jumping World Cup – Zakopane was a series of ski jumping competitions held as part of the 2001–02 FIS Ski Jumping World Cup from 18 to 20 January 2002 at the Wielka Krokiew in Zakopane, Poland.

Two individual competitions were contested on the large hill, marking the seventh time Zakopane hosted World Cup ski jumping events. These were the 15th and 16th competitions of the 2001–02 World Cup season.

The first competition was won by Matti Hautamäki of Finland, while the second was won by Adam Małysz of Poland. Sven Hannawald of Germany finished second in both events. Third place went to Andreas Widhölzl of Austria in the first competition and Matti Hautamäki in the second.

This was the fifth time Zakopane hosted two individual large hill competitions as part of the Ski Jumping World Cup. In 1980, one competition was held on the normal hill and one on the large hill, while in 1990, a single large hill competition took place.

A total of 73 athletes from 16 nations participated, with the oldest competitor being the Czech Republic's Jaroslav Sakala (32 years, 188 days) and the youngest being Belarus' Alexandr Svietlov (17 years, 285 days).

== Pre-competition ==
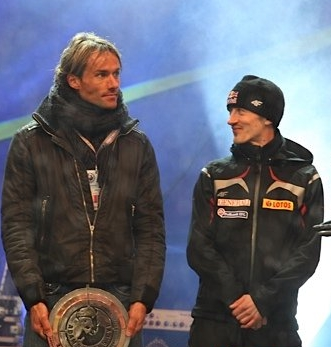
Sven Hannawald and Adam Małysz, second and first in the World Cup standings before the Zakopane events

Prior to the Zakopane events, 16 competitions had been held in the 2001–02 World Cup season, including 14 individual and two team events. The overall World Cup leader was Adam Małysz of Poland with 1074 points, 175 points ahead of Sven Hannawald of Germany. Matti Hautamäki of Finland held third place with 611 points. In the Nations Cup, Germany led, followed by Austria and Finland.

Previous World Cup events in the season saw victories by Adam Małysz and Sven Hannawald (six times each), Risto Jussilainen, and Stephan Hocke (once each).

From 30 December 2001 to 6 January 2002, the 2001–02 Four Hills Tournament was held, with Sven Hannawald becoming the first skier to win all four competitions in a single edition. Matti Hautamäki finished second, and Martin Höllwarth took third, while Adam Małysz, a pre-tournament favorite, placed fourth.

The most recent competitions before Zakopane, held in Willingen, Germany, on 12–13 January, were won by Sven Hannawald (individual) and the Austrian team (team event). In the individual competition, Hannawald outperformed Matti Hautamäki and Veli-Matti Lindström of Finland. In the team event, Austria defeated Finland and Germany.

=== World Cup standings before Zakopane ===
World Cup standings before Zakopane events
Rank	Athlete	Country	Points	Deficit to leader
1	Adam Małysz	Poland	1074	–
2	Sven Hannawald	Germany	899	175
3	Matti Hautamäki	Finland	611	463
4	Martin Höllwarth	Austria	575	499
5	Andreas Widhölzl	Austria	505	569
6	Stephan Hocke	Germany	457	617
7	Martin Schmitt	Germany	444	630
8	Simon Ammann	Switzerland	402	672
9	Andreas Goldberger	Austria	360	714
10	Risto Jussilainen	Finland	342	732
11	Kazuyoshi Funaki	Japan	328	746
12	Martin Koch	Austria	259	815
12	Roberto Cecon	Italy	259	815
14	Stefan Horngacher	Austria	239	835
15	Alan Alborn	United States	203	871
16	Veli-Matti Lindström	Finland	200	874
17	Peter Žonta	Slovenia	185	889
18	Hideharu Miyahira	Japan	177	897
19	Valery Kobelev	Russia	176	898
20	Jakub Janda	Czech Republic	141	933
21	Christof Duffner	Germany	134	940
22	Janne Ahonen	Finland	133	941
22	Jussi Hautamäki	Finland	133	941
24	Andreas Küttel	Switzerland	126	948
25	Toni Nieminen	Finland	124	950
26	Robert Kranjec	Slovenia	121	953
27	Noriaki Kasai	Japan	109	965
28	Georg Späth	Germany	108	966
29	Hiroki Yamada	Japan	106	968
30	Damjan Fras	Slovenia	104	970
31	Tami Kiuru	Finland	87	987
32	Michael Uhrmann	Germany	84	990
33	Primož Peterka	Slovenia	83	991
34	Roar Ljøkelsøy	Norway	82	992
35	Masahiko Harada	Japan	73	1001
36	Alexander Herr	Germany	72	1002
37	Ildar Fatkullin	Russia	67	1007
38	Tommy Ingebrigtsen	Norway	66	1008
39	Nicolas Dessum	France	61	1013
40	Clint Jones	United States	51	1023
41	Anders Bardal	Norway	44	1030
42	Kazuya Yoshioka	Japan	43	1031
43	Janne Happonen	Finland	25	1049
44	Wolfgang Loitzl	Austria	24	1050
45	Dirk Else	Germany	23	1051
46	Janne Ylijärvi	Finland	21	1053
47	Michal Doležal	Czech Republic	20	1054
48	Manuel Fettner	Austria	19	1055
49	Lassi Huuskonen	Finland	15	1059
50	Ville Kantee	Finland	13	1061
51	Robert Mateja	Poland	9	1065
51	Igor Medved	Slovenia	9	1065
51	Kristoffer Jåfs	Sweden	9	1065
54	Frank Löffler	Germany	8	1066
54	Tomasz Pochwała	Poland	8	1066
56	Tomisław Tajner	Poland	7	1067
57	Sylvain Freiholz	Switzerland	6	1068
57	Stanislav Filimonov	Kazakhstan	6	1068
57	Emmanuel Chedal	France	6	1068
60	Rok Benkovič	Slovenia	5	1069
60	Pekka Salminen	Finland	5	1069
62	Wojciech Skupień	Poland	4	1070
63	Jörg Ritzerfeld	Germany	3	1071
64	Rémi Santiago	France	2	1072
65	Hansjörg Jäkle	Germany	1	1073
65	Choi Heung-chul	South Korea	1	1073

=== Event organization ===
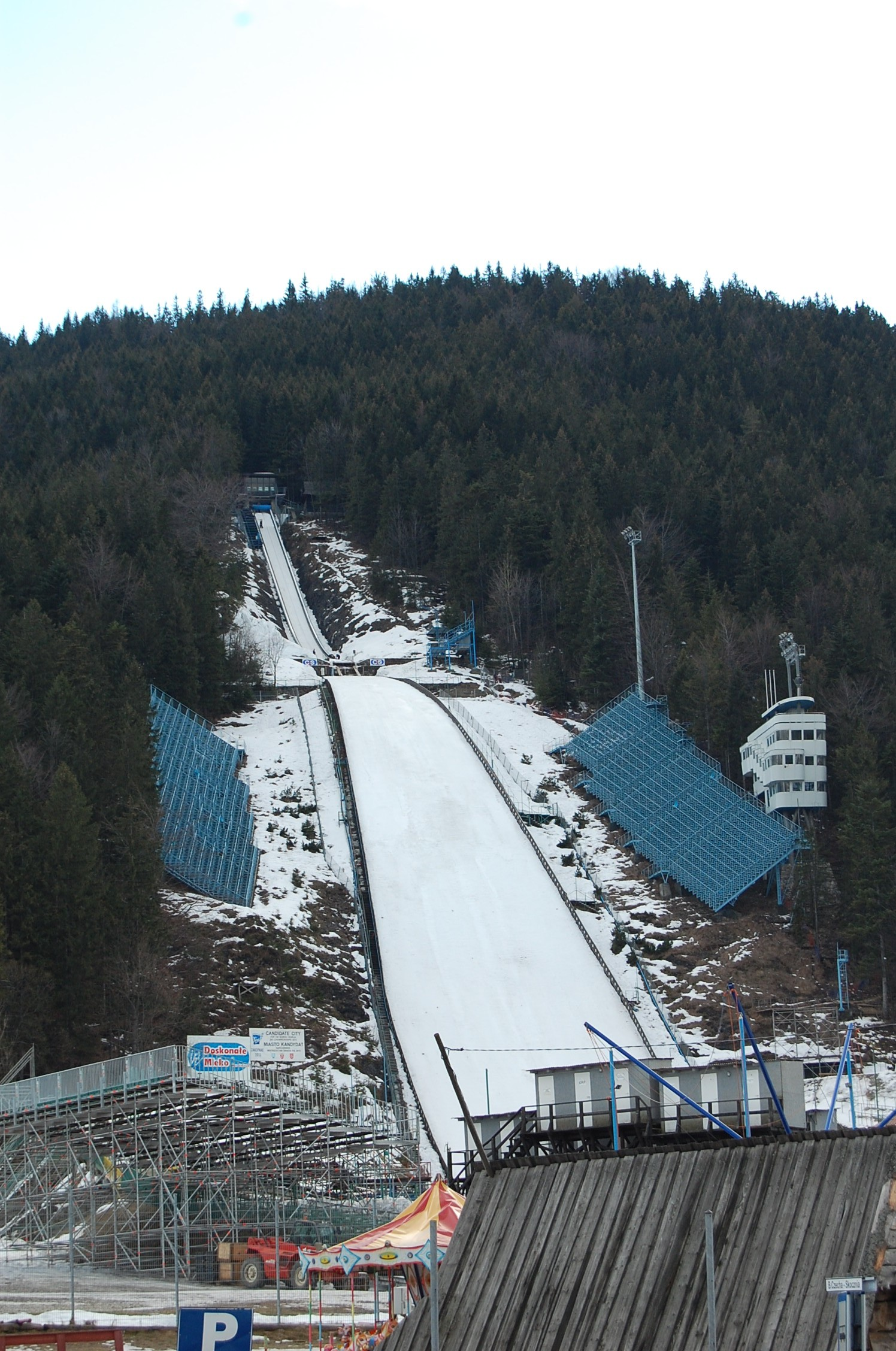
Wielka Krokiew in Zakopane

For the first time, the World Cup competitions were to be held on the modernized Wielka Krokiew. The ski jump was rebuilt ahead of the 2001 Winter Universiade. As part of the modernization, the construction point was moved from 116 to 120 meters, and the jury point from 128 to 134 meters.

For each of the two competitions, the organizers prepared 40.000 tickets, half of which were available in presale. The ticket price for both competitions was 20 PLN, and for one competition – 15 PLN. The reduced-price ticket cost 5 PLN.

=== Event schedule ===
The first official ski jumping training was scheduled for 18 January 2002, and the last event was the second World Cup competition held two days later. In total, two individual competitions were planned, as well as two qualification rounds, two official trainings, and one trial round.

Date	Time	Event
18 January 2002	11:00 AM	Official training on the K-120 hill (2 rounds)
18 January 2002	1:00 PM	Qualification round before the individual competition on the K-120 hill
19 January 2002	12:00 PM	Trial round before the individual competition on the K-120 hill
19 January 2002	1:45 PM	Start of the first round of the individual competition on the K-120 hill, followed by the second competition round
20 January 2002	12:00 PM	Qualification round before the individual competition on the K-120 hill
20 January 2002	1:45 PM	Start of the first round of the individual competition on the K-120 hill, followed by the second competition round

== Ski jumping hill ==
The 2002 World Cup ski jumping competitions in Zakopane were held at Wielka Krokiew, a ski jumping hill named after the skier Stanisław Marusarz, located on the northern slope of Krokiew mountain in the Western Tatras. Two individual competitions were conducted at the venue. Wielka Krokiew has hosted World Cup competitions six times before – in 1980, 1990, 1996, 1998, and in January and December 1999.

== Jury ==
On behalf of the International Ski Federation, the competition director was Walter Hofer, with Miran Tepeš as his assistant. Additionally, the head of the competitions representing the World Cup organizers in Zakopane was the Pole Władysław Gąsienica Roj. The technical delegate during all the competitions was the Norwayn Torgeir Nordby, assisted by the Austrian Max Sandbichler.

Judge	Country	Judging tower position			
Judge	Country	Qualification for first individual competition (18 January 2002)	First individual competition (19 January 2002)	Qualification for second individual competition (20 January 2002)	Second individual competition (20 January 2002)
Bruno Bosin	Italy	E	E	A	A
Kazimierz Długopolski	Poland	B	B	C	C
Gerhard Krab	Austria	D	D	B	B
Geir S. Løng	Norway	A	A	D	D
Peter Schlank	Slovakia	C	C	E	E

== Competition ==
=== Training rounds and qualifications for the first individual competition (18 January 2002) ===
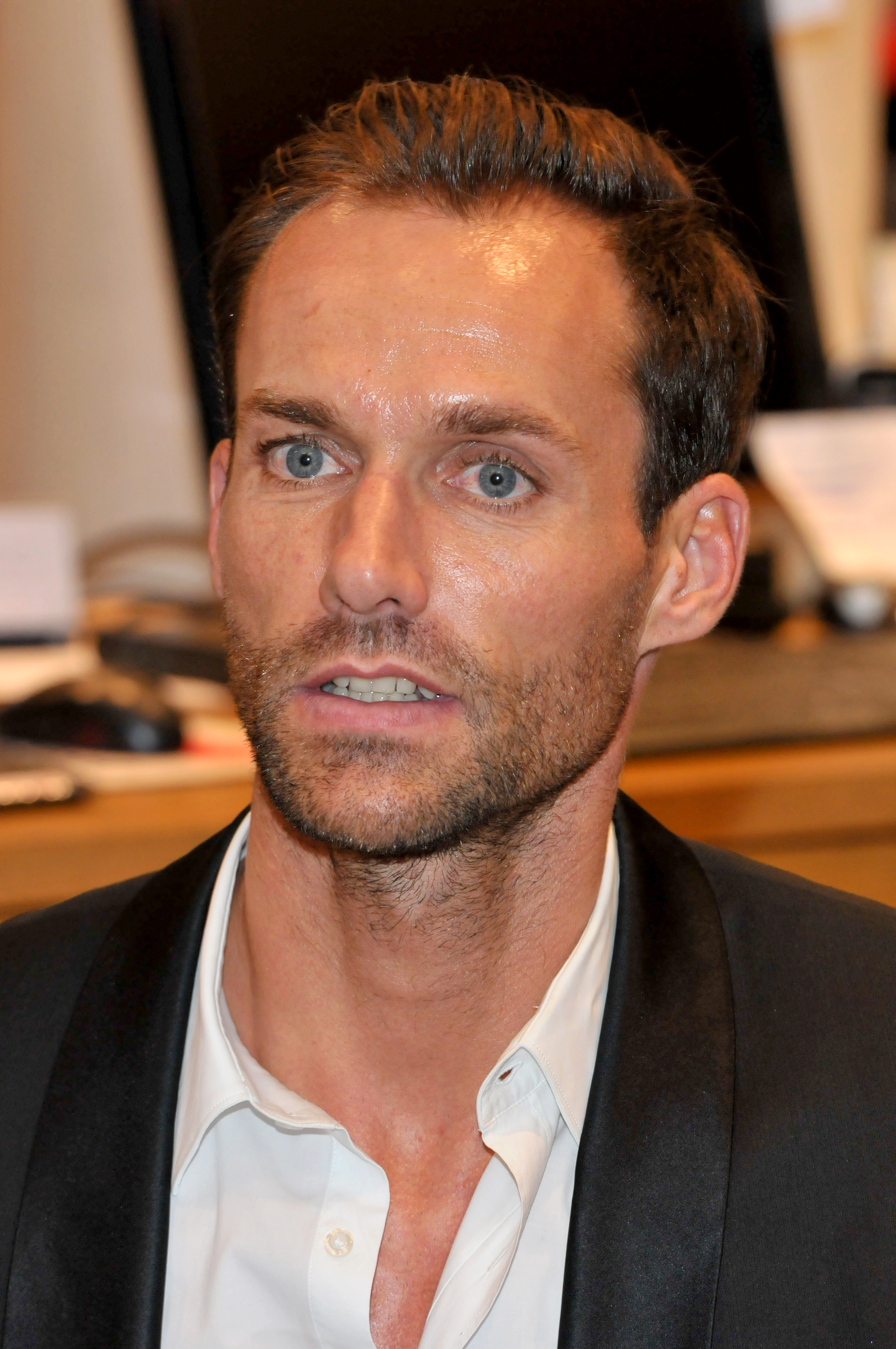
Sven Hannawald, twice runner-up in Zakopane

The first of three training rounds began on Friday, 18 January at 11:00 AM. Its winner was Adam Małysz, who achieved a distance of 125 meters in his attempt. Sven Hannawald landed one meter shorter. The third-best result was by Michael Uhrmann with 118 meters.

In the second training, the longest jump was made by Sven Hannawald. The German representative landed at 132 meters. Adam Małysz jumped 3.5 meters shorter. Andreas Widhölzl was third with 125 meters.

The qualification round for the first individual event started at 1:00 PM. It ended with a win by Robert Kranjec. The Slovenian jumper reached 129.5 meters and was the best competitor among those fighting for a place in the first competition round. Andreas Widhölzl landed four meters shorter and took second place. Third was Norwayn Anders Bardal, who jumped 126 meters. Competitors already qualified for the competition started from the 14th and 13th start gates, while those fighting for a place in the competition jumped from the 14th gate.

Despite being listed on the start list, Jussi Hautamäki, Ville Kantee, and Sven Hannawald – who had a guaranteed place in the competition due to holding second place in the World Cup standings – did not participate in the qualifications.

69 out of 72 registered athletes from 16 countries took part in the qualifications.

=== Trial round before the first individual competition (19 January 2002) ===
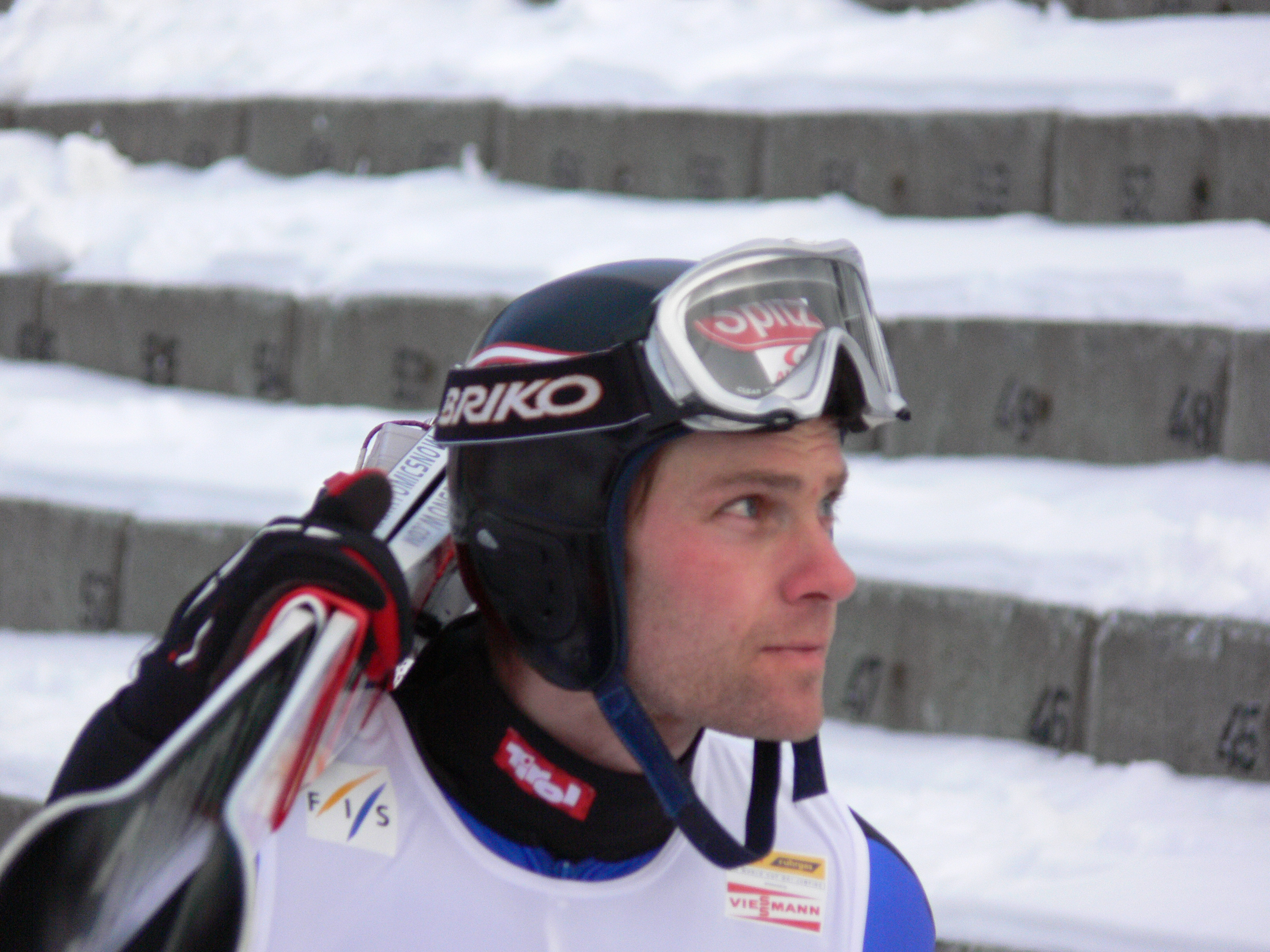
Andreas Widhölzl, who placed third in the first competition in Zakopane

The trial round before the first individual competition began on 19 January at 12:00 PM. It ended with a victory by Martin Schmitt, who jumped 136 meters. This jump was half a meter longer than the Wielka Krokiew record, which was held by Stefan Kaiser and set in March 2001 during the Continental Cup competition.

=== First individual competition (19 January 2002) ===
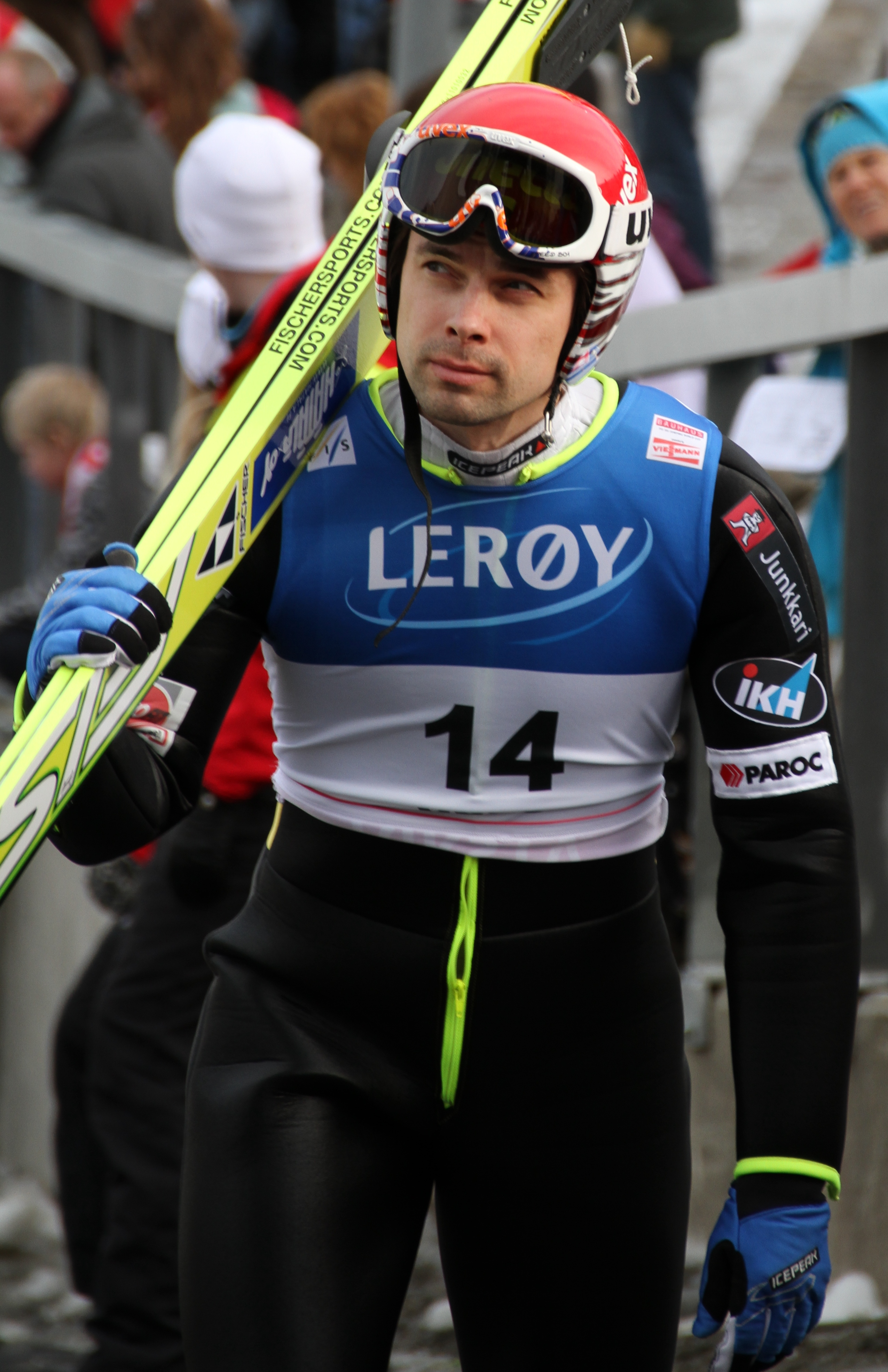
Matti Hautamäki, winner of the first competition in Zakopane

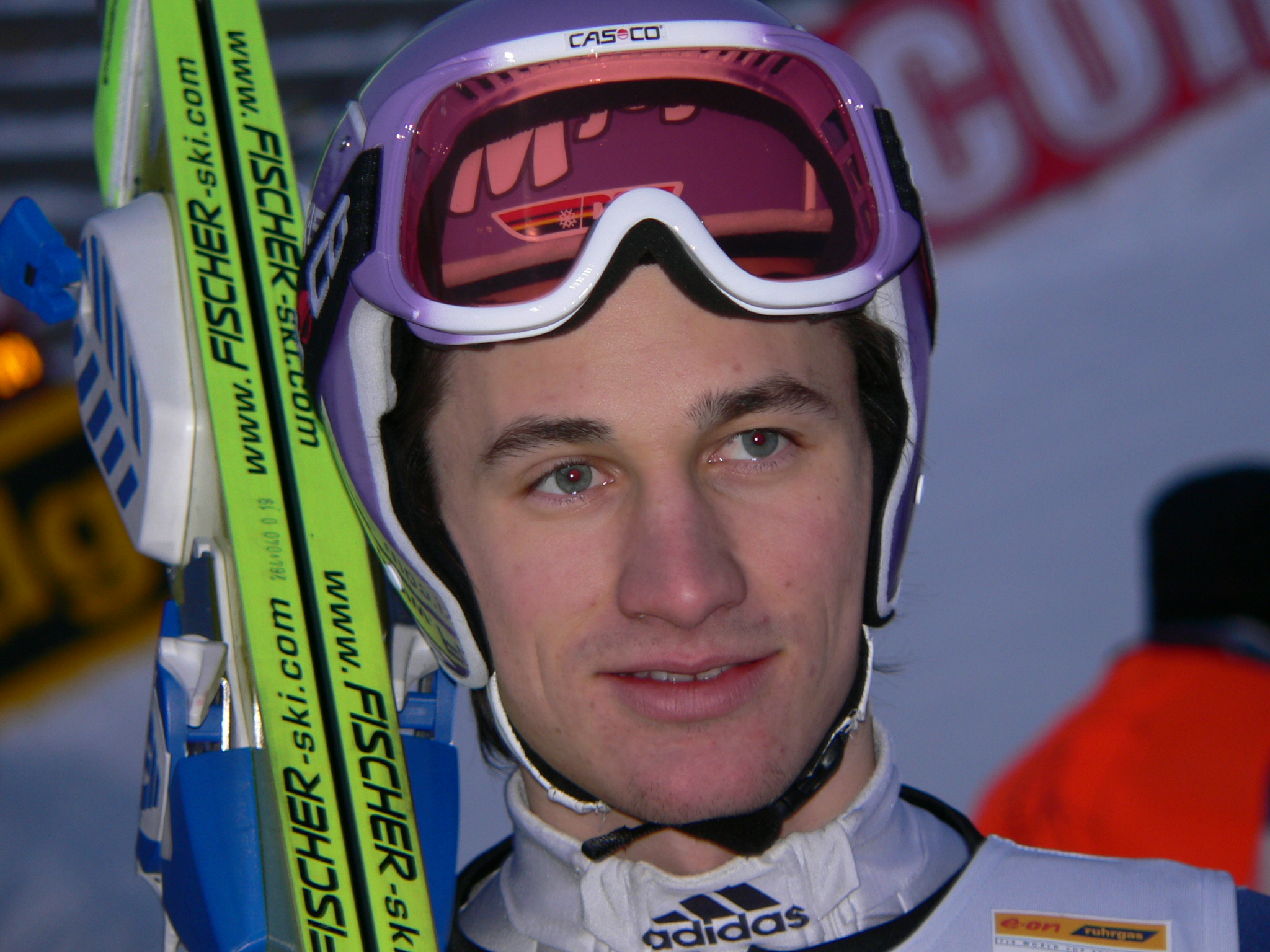
Martin Schmitt, fourth and fifth place finisher in the Zakopane competitions

The first individual competition started on 19 January at 1:45 PM. The event took place under variable wind conditions.

The first to jump was Marcin Bachleda, who reached 99.5 meters. The Pole led until the jump of the third competitor, Łukasz Kruczek, who landed 10.5 meters further than his compatriot and became the new leader. The fifth jumper on the hill was Blaž Vrhovnik, who, thanks to a distance of 112 meters, was classified in first place. The Slovenian led the competition until Lars Bystøl's jump. The Norwayn, starting with number 15, reached 116 meters. The same result was achieved by Tomasz Pochwała, who, due to higher style points, overtook Bystøl by 0.5 points. Pochwała led until the jump of his compatriot, Robert Mateja (118.5 m). Dirk Else jumped 6.5 meters further than Mateja. The German became the new leader of the competition, with a 10.2 point lead over Mateja. Dirk Else could not be overtaken by Wolfgang Loitzl (121.5 m), Primož Peterka (117.5 m), Michael Uhrmann (117.5 m), Peter Žonta (121.5 m), and Stefan Horngacher (106.5 m).

The first of the last 10 competitors in the first round was Martin Koch, who jumped 125 meters and became the leader of the competition with a 2-point advantage over Else. The next to jump was Risto Jussilainen, who landed at 114 meters. Andreas Goldberger jumped 88.5 meters and was classified in the last place. Another German competitor, Martin Schmitt, reached 122 meters and took third place in the competition. His compatriot, Stephan Hocke, landed at 112.5 meters and was ranked 25th after his attempt. Andreas Widhölzl flew 11.5 meters further and became the new leader of the competition. The Austrian was ahead of his compatriot Koch by 0.7 points. Martin Höllwarth jumped 120.5 meters. Three meters further landed Matti Hautamäki, who took third place in the competition. Sven Hannawald jumped 124 meters after him. The German overtook the Finn by 0.4 points and took third place. The World Cup leader Adam Małysz jumped 120.5 meters and was ranked seventh, 6.3 points behind the leader Andreas Widhölzl. Behind the Austrian, the next positions were held by Martin Koch and Sven Hannawald.

The second round started with Christof Duffner, who jumped 119.5 meters. The lead changed after the next jumper, Stephan Hocke, who landed 4 meters further. The German led the competition until the attempt of Veli-Matti Lindström, who was 22nd after the first round (112 m). Hocke improved by 9 meters in the final round and took the lead by 6.1 points over Lindström. The lead changed again after Risto Jussilainen's jump. The Finn landed 2 meters further than Lindström and overtook him by 6.2 points. Jussilainen led the competition until the jump of Robert Mateja, 12th after the first round. The Pole landed at 120 meters. Mateja could not beat Toni Nieminen, who, after a 117-meter jump, lost to the Pole by 7.4 points. The leader from Zakopane was replaced by Robert Kranjec, 11th after the first round. The Slovenian jumped 121.5 meters. Martin Höllwarth, who opened the last 10 competitors, jumped 124.5 meters and took the lead. Next was Wolfgang Loitzl, who, with a jump of 116.5 meters, took fourth place. Peter Žonta, eighth after the first round, also landed at 116.5 meters and was fourth in the competition, tied with Loitzl. Adam Małysz landed 4.5 meters further than Žonta and was ranked second, 4.8 points behind Höllwarth. Martin Schmitt, who jumped next, reached 128.5 meters and took the lead. Dirk Else, who was fifth after the first jump, jumped 115 meters and dropped to eighth place at Wielka Krokiew. 16 meters further than Else was Matti Hautamäki, who became the new leader with an 11.7 point lead over Schmitt. Sven Hannawald, third after the first round, jumped 130 meters, placing second with a 0.4 point deficit to the leading Finn. Martin Koch jumped 10 meters less and took fifth place. The winner of the first round, Andreas Widhölzl, jumped 124.5 meters and took third place. Thus, the winner of the first World Cup competition in Zakopane was Matti Hautamäki. It was his second World Cup victory in his career and the first of the season. The next places on the podium went to Sven Hannawald and Andreas Widhölzl.

51 competitors from 13 countries participated in the competition.

=== Qualifications for the second individual competition (20 January 2002) ===
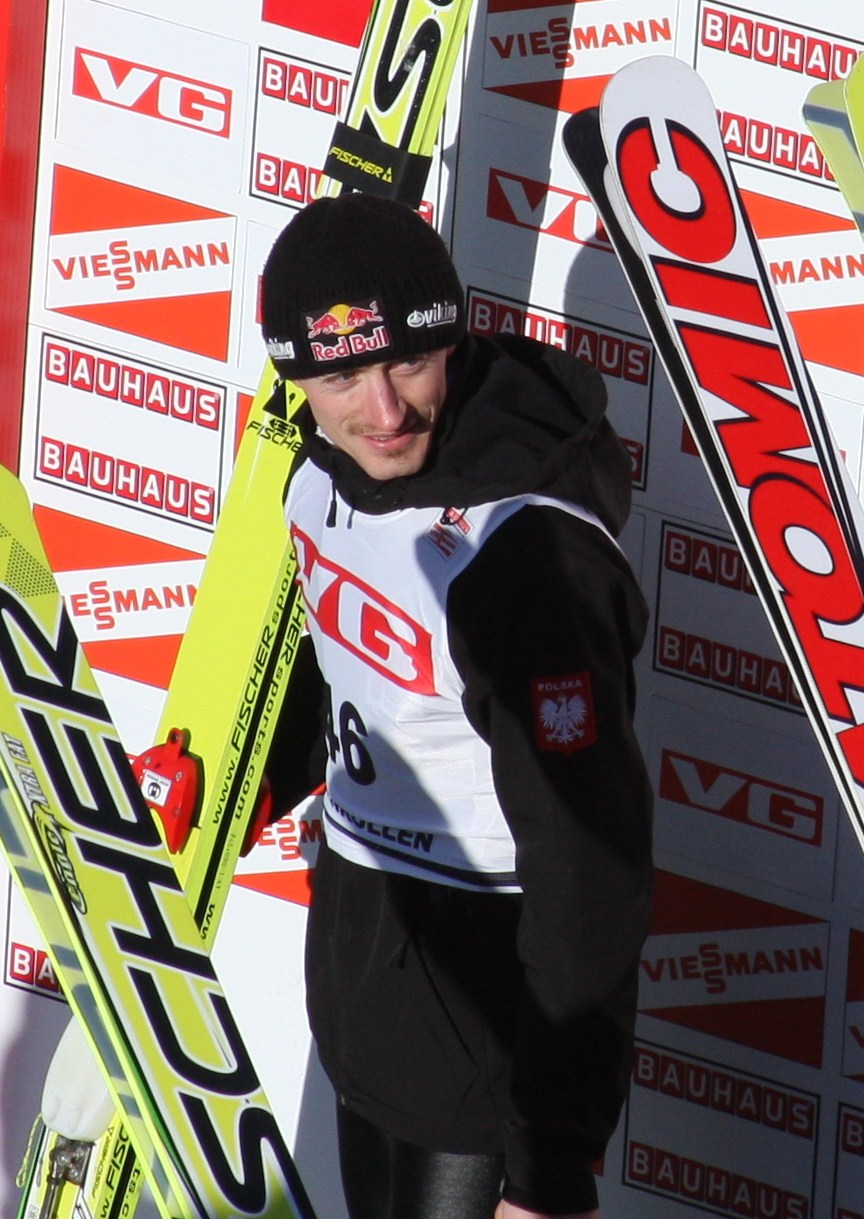
Adam Małysz, winner of the second competition in Zakopane

The qualification round for the second individual competition in Zakopane began on 20 January at 12:00 PM. The winner was Christof Duffner. The German jumper reached a distance of 131.5 meters and was the best among those competing for a place in the main event. Robert Kranjec was ranked second, landing at 128 meters. The third-place qualifier, Martin Schmitt, reached a distance half a meter shorter. Competitors who were already guaranteed a spot in the competition started their attempts from the 9th start gate, while those fighting for qualification jumped from the 10th gate.

69 athletes from 16 countries took part in the qualifications.

=== Second individual competition (20 January 2002) ===
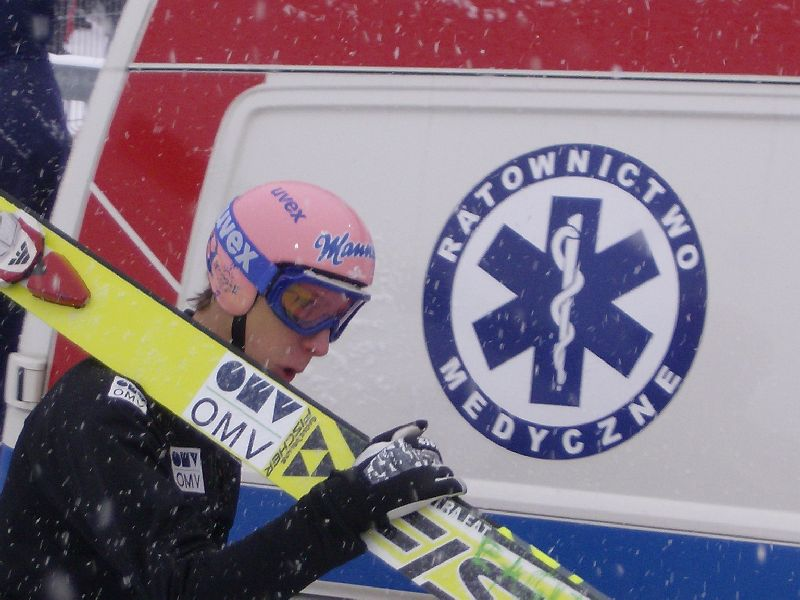
Martin Koch, sixth and seventh place finisher in the Zakopane competitions

The second individual competition at Wielka Krokiew began on 20 January at 1:48 PM. The event opened with Andrzej Galica, who jumped 106 meters. The Pole led until Grzegorz Śliwka jumped the same distance but received higher style points, taking the lead. Marcin Bachleda then improved the result with a jump of 114.5 meters. Igor Medved surpassed him by 1.5 meters and became the new leader. The Slovenian stayed in front until Tomasz Pochwała landed at 119.5 meters. Wolfgang Loitzl achieved the same distance but with higher style marks, overtaking Pochwała. The Austrian lost the lead to Anders Bardal, who exceeded the hill's construction point by half a meter. Tami Kiuru jumped one meter farther and took the lead by 0.8 points over Bardal. Stefan Horngacher landed at 124 meters but had lower style points and led Kiuru by only one point. His compatriot Martin Koch jumped 117 meters, finishing behind Horngacher by 2.5 meters but with better style, taking the lead. Andreas Goldberger jumped 2.5 meters closer but with better style, taking the lead. Risto Jussilainen jumped 117.5 meters and was eighth, while Stephan Hocke jumped 117 meters, placing 13th. Martin Schmitt overtook Goldberger with a 123-meter jump, beating the Austrian by 2.2 points. Andreas Widhölzl then jumped 125.5 meters, followed by Martin Höllwarth, who jumped three meters shorter. Matti Hautamäki, winner of Saturday's competition, jumped 128.5 meters and led by 4.4 points over Widhölzl. Sven Hannawald jumped 1.5 meters farther and took the lead. The last jumper in the first round, World Cup leader Adam Małysz, achieved the longest jump of the round at 131.5 meters and took the lead with a 1.3-point advantage over Hannawald. Matti Hautamäki was third.

The second round started with 30th place after the first round, Christof Duffner, who jumped 108 meters but did not hold the lead for long as Peter Žonta followed with 114.5 meters. Žonta led until Blaž Vrhovnik jumped 115 meters. Robert Mateja, who was 25th after the first round, jumped 115.5 meters and surpassed Vrhovnik by 1.8 points. Martin Koch, 19th after the first round, jumped 129.5 meters in the second attempt, overtaking Mateja by 31.3 points. Anders Bardal jumped 106.5 meters and fell to 14th place, 36.1 points behind Koch. Tami Kiuru landed at 111.5 meters, falling to ninth place. Stefan Horngacher jumped 121 meters but lost to Koch by 6.7 points. Andreas Goldberger, seventh after the first round, jumped 114.5 meters and stayed in seventh place. Martin Schmitt jumped 9.5 meters farther and took the lead with a 3.4-point advantage over Koch. Martin Höllwarth, fifth at the halfway point, jumped 122.5 meters and took second place behind Schmitt and ahead of Koch. Andreas Widhölzl landed at 121.5 meters and took the lead. Matti Hautamäki then jumped half a meter farther, taking the lead with a 6.8-point margin over Widhölzl. Sven Hannawald, second after the first round, jumped 125 meters and overtook Hautamäki by 9.6 points. The last jumper, Adam Małysz, jumped 123.5 meters and, with higher style points, won the competition by 0.6 points over Hannawald. This was Małysz's 21st World Cup victory, seventh of the season, and first in his home country. Just behind him were Sven Hannawald and Matti Hautamäki.

50 competitors from 11 countries participated in the contest.

== Controversies ==
During the competitions, a significant number of fans holding genuine tickets were not allowed into the stands. Meanwhile, people with fake tickets appeared under the hill. The organizers were unable to control the crowd of spectators interested in the event. As a result, each day of the competition saw around 80.000 fans at Wielka Krokiew, instead of the planned 40.000. The organizers apologized to the affected fans and offered them free tickets to the Polish Championships and Continental Cup competitions.

Another controversy arose from the behavior of some spectators gathered under the hill. The audience clearly showed their dislike for Sven Hannawald by whistling and booing during every one of his competition attempts and even when the German athlete stood on the podium. The behavior of the fans was criticized by both Polish and German media. The athlete himself described the competitions held in Zakopane as "hell".

== World Cup standings after the competitions in Zakopane ==
In the World Cup standings after the competitions in Zakopane, several changes occurred among the top athletes. Martin Schmitt moved up from 7th to 6th place, overtaking Stephan Hocke. Andreas Goldberger dropped from 9th to 10th, being overtaken by Risto Jussilainen. Martin Koch advanced to 11th place. Kazuyoshi Funaki, who had been ranked 11th before the competitions in Poland, dropped to 12th. Positions also swapped between the 13th and 14th place holders before the Zakopane events – Roberto Cecon and Stefan Horngacher. In the top 15 of the overall World Cup standings, there was only one change in personnel: 15th-ranked Alan Alborn before the Wielka Krokiew competitions was replaced in that spot by Veli-Matti Lindström.

In the Nations Cup standings, there were no changes at the top. The first three positions remained with Germany, Austria, and Finland.

World Cup standings after the competitions in Zakopane
Rank	Athlete	Country	Points	Deficit to leader
1.	Adam Małysz	Poland	1210	–
2.	Sven Hannawald	Germany	1059	151
3.	Matti Hautamäki	Finland	771	439
4.	Martin Höllwarth	Austria	660	550
5.	Andreas Widhölzl	Austria	615	595
6.	Martin Schmitt	Germany	539	671
7.	Stephan Hocke	Germany	482	728
8.	Simon Ammann	Switzerland	402	808
9.	Risto Jussilainen	Finland	386	824
10.	Andreas Goldberger	Japan	380	830
11.	Martin Koch	Austria	335	875
12.	Kazuyoshi Funaki	Japan	328	882
13.	Stefan Horngacher	Austria	268	942
14.	Roberto Cecon	Italy	263	947
15.	Veli-Matti Lindström	Finland	220	990
16.	Peter Žonta	Slovenia	217	993
17.	Alan Alborn	United States	203	1007
18.	Robert Kranjec	Slovenia	179	1031
19.	Hideharu Miyahira	Japan	177	1033
20.	Valery Kobelev	Russia	176	1034
21.	Janne Ahonen	Finland	151	1059
22.	Christof Duffner	Germany	142	1068
22.	Toni Nieminen	Finland	142	1068
24.	Jakub Janda	Czech Republic	141	1069
25.	Jussi Hautamäki	Finland	133	1077
26.	Andreas Küttel	Switzerland	126	1084
27.	Damjan Fras	Slovenia	125	1085
28.	Primož Peterka	Slovenia	121	1089
29.	Georg Späth	Germany	118	1092
30.	Noriaki Kasai	Japan	109	1101
31.	Hiroki Yamada	Japan	106	1104
32.	Tami Kiuru	Finland	101	1109
33.	Michael Uhrmann	Germany	100	1110
34.	Roar Ljøkelsøy	Norway	91	1119
35.	Alexander Herr	Germany	90	1120
36.	Wolfgang Loitzl	Austria	82	1128
37.	Masahiko Harada	Japan	73	1137
38.	Ildar Fatkullin	Russia	67	1143
39.	Tommy Ingebrigtsen	Norway	66	1144
40.	Anders Bardal	Norway	63	1147
41.	Nicolas Dessum	France	61	1149
42.	Clint Jones	United States	51	1159
43.	Robert Mateja	Poland	50	1160
44.	Dirk Else	Germany	46	1164
45.	Kazuya Yoshioka	Japan	43	1167
46.	Tomasz Pochwała	Poland	38	1172
47.	Janne Happonen	Finland	25	1185
48.	Janne Ylijärvi	Finland	21	1189
49.	Michal Doležal	Czech Republic	20	1190
50.	Manuel Fettner	Austria	19	1191
51.	Blaž Vrhovnik	Slovenia	18	1192
52.	Lassi Huuskonen	Finland	15	1195
52.	Igor Medved	Slovenia	15	1195
54.	Ville Kantee	Finland	13	1197
55.	Lars Bystøl	Norway	11	1199
56.	Kristoffer Jåfs	Sweden	9	1201
57.	Frank Löffler	Germany	8	1202
58.	Tomisław Tajner	Poland	7	1203
59.	Emmanuel Chedal	France	6	1204
59.	Sylvain Freiholz	Switzerland	6	1204
59.	Stanislav Filimonov	Kazakhstan	6	1204
62.	Łukasz Kruczek	Poland	5	1205
62.	Pekka Salminen	Finland	5	1205
62.	Rok Benkovič	Slovenia	5	1205
65.	Wojciech Skupień	Poland	4	1206
66.	Marcin Bachleda	Poland	3	1207
66.	Jörg Ritzerfeld	Germany	3	1207
68.	Rémi Santiago	France	2	1208
68.	Stefan Kaiser	Austria	2	1208
70.	Choi Heung-chul	South Korea	1	1209
70.	Hansjörg Jäkle	Germany	1	1209

== Medalists ==
=== First individual competition (19 January 2002) ===
Medal	Name	Jump 1	Jump 2	Style points A • B • C • D • E	Total score	Deficit
	(Finland) Matti Hautamäki	123.5 m 122.8 points	131.0 m 136.8 points	18.5 • 19.0 • 18.0 • 19.0 • 19.0; 19.0 • 19.0 • 19.0 • 19.0 • 19.5	259.6 points	–
	(Germany) Sven Hannawald	124.0 m 123.2 points	130.0 m 136.0 points	18.5 • 18.5 • 18.5 • 19.0 • 19.0; 19.5 • 19.0 • 19.5 • 19.5 • 19.0	259.2 points	0.4 points
	(Austria) Andreas Widhölzl	124.0 m 124.2 points	124.5 m 125.6 points	19.0 • 19.0 • 19.0 • 19.0 • 19.0; 19.0 • 19.0 • 19.0 • 19.5 • 19.5	249.8 points	9.8 points

=== Second individual competition (20 January 2002) ===
Medal	Name	Jump 1	Jump 2	Style points A • B • C • D • E	Total score	Deficit
	(Poland) Adam Małysz	131.0 m 137.3 points	123.5 m 124.8 points	19.0 • 19.0 • 19.5 • 19.5 • 19.0; 19.5 • 19.5 • 19.5 • 19.5 • 19.5	262.1 points	–
	(Germany) Sven Hannawald	130.0 m 136.0 points	125.0 m 125.5 points	19.5 • 19.0 • 19.0 • 19.5 • 19.5; 19.5 • 19.0 • 18.5 • 19.0 • 18.5	261.5 points	0.6 points
	(Finland) Matti Hautamäki	128.5 m 131.3 points	122.0 m 120.6 points	19.0 • 19.0 • 18.5 • 18.5 • 18.5; 19.0 • 19.0 • 19.0 • 19.0 • 19.0	251.9 points	10.2 points

== Results ==
=== Qualifications for the first individual competition (18 January 2002) ===
Rank	Athlete	Country	Jump	Gate	Points	Qualification
1.	Robert Kranjec	Slovenia	129.5	14	128.1	Q
2.	Andreas Widhölzl	Austria	125.5	13	126.9	pq
3.	Anders Bardal	Norway	126.0	14	125.8	Q
4.	Lars Bystøl	Norway	126.0	14	125.3	Q
5.	Stefan Kaiser	Austria	126.0	14	124.3	Q
6.	Michael Uhrmann	Germany	124.5	14	122.1	Q
7.	Adam Małysz	Poland	126.0	13	121.8	pq
7.	Martin Höllwarth	Austria	123.5	13	121.8	pq
9.	Wolfgang Loitzl	Austria	123.5	14	120.8	Q
10.	Igor Medved	Slovenia	124.0	14	120.7	Q
11.	Martin Koch	Austria	123.5	14	120.3	pq
11.	Tami Kiuru	Finland	123.5	14	120.3	Q
13.	Georg Späth	Germany	124.5	14	119.6	Q
14.	Veli-Matti Lindström	Finland	123.0	14	119.4	Q
15.	Martin Schmitt	Germany	122.5	14	119.0	pq
16.	Robert Mateja	Poland	122.0	14	118.6	Q
17.	Christof Duffner	Germany	123.5	14	118.3	Q
18.	Tomasz Pochwała	Poland	122.5	14	118.0	Q
19.	Primož Peterka	Slovenia	123.0	14	117.9	Q
20.	Risto Jussilainen	Finland	122.5	14	117.0	pq
21.	Damjan Fras	Slovenia	121.5	14	116.7	Q
22.	Toni Nieminen	Finland	122.5	14	116.5	Q
23.	Andreas Goldberger	Austria	121.0	14	116.3	pq
24.	Roar Ljøkelsøy	Norway	120.5	14	115.9	Q
25.	Jakub Janda	Czech Republic	119.5	14	115.1	Q
26.	Roberto Cecon	Italy	123.0	14	114.9	pq
27.	Janne Ahonen	Finland	121.0	14	114.8	Q
28.	Peter Žonta	Slovenia	122.0	14	114.6	Q
29.	Stefan Horngacher	Austria	121.0	14	114.3	pq
30.	Dirk Else	Germany	122.0	14	113.6	Q
31.	Blaž Vrhovnik	Slovenia	119.5	14	113.1	Q
32.	Andrey Lyskovets	Belarus	119.0	14	112,2	Q
33.	Alexander Herr	Germany	119.5	14	112.1	Q
34.	Matti Hautamäki	Finland	120.0	13	110.0	pq
35.	Tomisław Tajner	Poland	117.5	14	109.5	Q
35.	Morten Solem	Norway	117.5	14	109.5	Q
37.	Jaroslav Sakala	Czech Republic	117.5	14	108.5	Q
38.	Marcin Bachleda	Poland	117.0	14	108.1	Q
39.	Stephan Hocke	Germany	116.5	13	105.7	pq
40.	Martin Mesík	Slovakia	117.5	14	105.0	Q
41.	Olav Magne Dønnem	Norway	115.0	14	104.5	Q
42.	Grzegorz Śliwka	Poland	115.5	14	103.9	Q
43.	Wojciech Skupień	Poland	115.0	14	103.0	Q
44.	Łukasz Kruczek	Poland	114.5	14	102.6	Q
45.	Marco Steinauer	Switzerland	114.0	14	101.7	Q
46.	Kristoffer Jåfs	Sweden	113.5	14	98.3	Q
47.	Jan Matura	Czech Republic	112.0	14	98.1	Q
48.	Sylvain Freiholz	Switzerland	111.5	14	96.2	Q
48.	Jaan Jüris	Estonia	111.5	14	96.2	Q
48.	Dmitry Zhuchikhin	Russia	111.5	14	96.2	Q
51.	Tommy Ingebrigtsen	Norway	112.5	14	95.5	nq
52.	Paweł Kruczek	Poland	111.5	14	95.2	nq
53.	Michal Doležal	Czech Republic	108.0	14	88.9	nq
54.	Volodymyr Boshchuk	Ukraine	107.0	14	85.1	nq
55.	Ján Zelenčík	Slovakia	107.5	14	85.0	nq
56.	Krystian Długopolski	Poland	105.5	14	84.9	nq
56.	Wojciech Tajner	Poland	105.5	14	84.9	nq
58.	Andrzej Galica	Poland	106.0	14	84.8	nq
59.	Dušan Oršula	Slovakia	105.0	14	83.0	nq
60.	Georgi Zharkov	Bulgaria	104.5	14	81.6	nq
61.	Ivan Kozlov	Ukraine	103.5	14	81.3	nq
62.	Siergey Kozhevnikov	Russia	104.5	14	80.6	nq
63.	Maciej Maciusiak	Poland	103.0	14	80.4	nq
64.	Jure Radelj	Slovenia	100.0	14	72.5	nq
65.	Alexander Svetlov	Belarus	97.5	14	66.5	nq
66.	Matej Uram	Slovakia	97.0	14	64.6	nq
67.	Grzegorz Sobczyk	Poland	96.0	14	63.8	nq
68.	Daniel Bachleda	Poland	95.5	14	63.4	nq
69.	Jouko Hein	Estonia	88.0	14	44.9	nq
–	Sven Hannawald	Germany	0.0	–	DNS	pq
–	Jussi Hautamäki	Finland	0.0	–	DNS	nq
–	Ville Kantee	Finland	0.0	–	DNS	nq

Legend:

pq – competitor has a guaranteed qualification due to being in the top 15 of the World Cup standings
Q – competitor qualified for the main competition
nq – competitor was eliminated in the qualification round
DNS – competitor did not start

=== First individual competition (19 January 2002) ===
Rank	Athlete	Country	Jump 1	Jump 2	Points
1.	Matti Hautamäki	Finland	123.5	131.0	259.6
2.	Sven Hannawald	Germany	124.0	130.0	259.2
3.	Andreas Widhölzl	Austria	124.0	124.5	249.8
4.	Martin Schmitt	Germany	122.0	128.5	247.9
5.	Martin Höllwarth	Austria	120.5	124.5	241.5
6.	Martin Koch	Austria	125.0	120.0	237.0
7.	Adam Małysz	Poland	120.5	121.0	236.7
8.	Robert Kranjec	Slovenia	119.5	121.5	229.8
9.	Robert Mateja	Poland	118.5	120.0	226.8
10.	Peter Žonta	Slovenia	121.5	116.5	225.4
10.	Wolfgang Loitzl	Austria	121.5	116.5	225.4
12.	Dirk Else	Germany	125.0	115.0	225.0
13.	Risto Jussilainen	Finland	114.0	123.0	221,1
14.	Toni Nieminen	Finland	118.5	117.0	219.4
15.	Michael Uhrmann	Germany	117.5	118.0	218.4
15.	Primož Peterka	Slovenia	117.5	118.0	218.4
17.	Tomasz Pochwała	Poland	116.0	118.0	217.2
18.	Veli-Matti Lindström	Finland	112.0	121.0	214.9
19.	Stephan Hocke	Germany	112.5	123.5	208.8
20.	Anders Bardal	Norway	120.5	112.5	207.9
21.	Georg Späth	Germany	113.5	116.0	206.6
21.	Damjan Fras	Slovenia	110.5	119.0	206.6
23.	Blaž Vrhovnik	Slovenia	112.0	116.5	204.3
24.	Lars Bystøl	Norway	116.0	111.5	204.3
25.	Christof Duffner	Germany	112.0	119.5	203.2
26.	Łukasz Kruczek	Poland	110.0	116.5	202,2
27.	Roberto Cecon	Italy	110.5	114.5	199.5
28.	Alexander Herr	Germany	113.0	111.0	197.2
29.	Stefan Kaiser	Austria	110.5	106.0	178.7
30.	Igor Medved	Slovenia	110.0	105.5	176.4
31.	Morten Solem	Norway	108.0	-	89.4
32.	Kristoffer Jåfs	Sweden	108.0	-	88.4
33.	Jaroslav Sakala	Czech Republic	106.0	-	87.3
34.	Janne Ahonen	Finland	108.0	-	86.4
35.	Stefan Horngacher	Austria	106.5	-	86.2
36.	Martin Mesík	Slovakia	105.0	-	83.5
37.	Tami Kiuru	Finland	105.5	-	83.4
38.	Roar Ljøkelsøy	Norway	105.5	-	82.9
39.	Jan Matura	Czech Republic	103.5	-	80.8
40.	Wojciech Skupień	Poland	103.5	-	80.3
41.	Tomisław Tajner	Poland	102.0	-	78.1
42.	Sylvain Freiholz	Switzerland	101.5	-	77.2
43.	Olav Magne Dønnem	Norway	100.5	-	74.4
44.	Jaan Jüris	Estonia	100.0	-	73.0
45.	Dmitry Zhuchikhin	Russia	99.5	-	72.6
46.	Marcin Bachleda	Poland	99.5	-	72.1
47.	Andrey Lyskovets	Belarus	98.0	-	68.9
48.	Grzegorz Śliwka	Poland	97.5	-	68.0
49.	Jakub Janda	Czech Republic	93.0	-	60.4
50.	Marco Steinauer	Switzerland	89.5	-	53.1
51.	Andreas Goldberger	Austria	88.5	-	47.3

=== Qualifications for the second individual competition (20 January 2002) ===
Rank	Athlete	Country	Jump	Gate	Points	Qualification
1.	Christof Duffner	Germany	131.5	10	130.7	Q
2.	Robert Kranjec	Slovenia	128.0	10	129.4	Q
3.	Martin Schmitt	Germany	127.5	9	128.5	pq
4.	Janne Ahonen	Finland	126.5	10	126.2	Q
5.	Martin Höllwarth	Austria	128.0	9	125.4	pq
6.	Michael Uhrmann	Germany	125.0	10	120.5	Q
7.	Peter Žonta	Slovenia	125.5	10	118.9	Q
8.	Tomasz Pochwała	Poland	122.5	10	118.5	Q
9.	Roar Ljøkelsøy	Norway	121.0	10	117.3	Q
10.	Andreas Widhölzl	Austria	121.5	9	116.7	pq
11.	Toni Nieminen	Finland	123.0	10	115.4	Q
12.	Jakub Janda	Czech Republic	119.5	10	115.1	Q
13.	Robert Mateja	Poland	119.0	10	112,2	Q
14.	Anders Bardal	Norway	117.5	10	110.5	Q
15.	Martin Koch	Austria	119.0	9	109.7	pq
16.	Stefan Kaiser	Austria	118.0	10	109.4	Q
17.	Matti Hautamäki	Finland	119.5	9	108.6	pq
18.	Damjan Fras	Slovenia	117.0	10	106.6	Q
19.	Alexander Herr	Germany	116.0	10	105.8	Q
20.	Tami Kiuru	Finland	116.5	10	105.7	Q
21.	Tommy Ingebrigtsen	Norway	117.0	10	105.6	Q
22.	Sven Hannawald	Germany	117.5	9	105.0	pq
23.	Veli-Matti Lindström	Finland	116.5	9	102.7	pq
24.	Sylvain Freiholz	Switzerland	113.5	10	102.3	Q
25.	Blaž Vrhovnik	Slovenia	114.0	10	102,2	Q
26.	Wolfgang Loitzl	Austria	113.0	10	101.9	Q
27.	Marcin Bachleda	Poland	113.0	10	100.4	Q
28.	Risto Jussilainen	Finland	113.0	9	99.9	pq
28.	Paweł Kruczek	Poland	113.0	10	99.9	Q
30.	Adam Małysz	Poland	114.0	9	99.2	pq
31.	Kristoffer Jåfs	Sweden	114.0	10	97.7	Q
32.	Łukasz Kruczek	Poland	112.0	10	97.1	Q
33.	Grzegorz Śliwka	Poland	111.0	10	96.8	Q
34.	Primož Peterka	Slovenia	111.5	10	96.2	Q
35.	Stefan Horngacher	Austria	112.5	9	95.0	pq
36.	Igor Medved	Slovenia	111.0	10	94.8	Q
37.	Lars Bystøl	Norway	110.0	10	94.5	Q
38.	Krystian Długopolski	Poland	109.0	10	93.2	Q
39.	Michal Doležal	Czech Republic	108.0	10	90.4	Q
40.	Andreas Goldberger	Austria	109.5	9	90.1	pq
41.	Andrzej Galica	Poland	110.0	10	89.5	Q
42.	Dmitry Zhuchikhin	Russia	107.0	10	87.6	Q
43.	Jaroslav Sakala	Czech Republic	106.0	10	87.3	Q
44.	Stephan Hocke	Germany	109.0	9	86.7	pq
44.	Georg Späth	Germany	106.5	10	86.7	Q
46.	Tomisław Tajner	Poland	105.5	10	85.4	Q
47.	Dirk Else	Germany	105.5	10	84.9	Q
47.	Håvard Lie	Norway	105.5	10	84.9	Q
49.	Wojciech Skupień	Poland	109.0	10	84.7	Q
50.	Siergey Kozhevnikov	Russia	104.5	10	81,1	nq
51.	Matej Uram	Slovakia	100.0	10	75.0	nq
52.	Jan Matura	Czech Republic	99.5	10	72.6	nq
53.	Volodymyr Boshchuk	Ukraine	100.5	10	72.4	nq
54.	Marco Steinauer	Switzerland	98.5	10	72.3	nq
55.	Dušan Oršula	Slovakia	99.0	10	70.7	nq
56.	Roberto Cecon	Italy	100.0	9	70.0	pq
57.	Andrey Lyskovets	Belarus	97.0	10	68.1	nq
58.	Martin Mesík	Slovakia	96.5	10	66.7	nq
59.	Jaan Jüris	Estonia	97.0	10	65.1	nq
60.	Wojciech Tajner	Poland	96.5	10	62.7	nq
61.	Jure Radelj	Slovenia	94.0	10	58.7	nq
62.	Morten Solem	Norway	92.0	10	58.6	nq
63.	Maciej Maciusiak	Poland	93.0	10	58.4	nq
64.	Daniel Bachleda	Poland	90.5	10	54.4	nq
65.	Ján Zelenčík	Slovakia	91.5	10	52,2	nq
66.	Grzegorz Sobczyk	Poland	89.0	10	51.7	nq
67.	Ivan Kozlov	Ukraine	88.0	10	50.4	nq
68.	Georgi Zharkov	Bulgaria	86.5	10	46.2	nq
69.	Jouko Hein	Estonia	58.0	10	0.0	nq

Legend:

pq – athlete has automatic qualification thanks to a position in the top 15 of the World Cup standings
Q – athlete qualified for the main competition
nq – athlete was eliminated in the qualifications

=== Second individual competition (20 January 2002) ===
Rank	Athlete	Country	Jump 1	Jump 2	Points
1.	Adam Małysz	Poland	131.0	123.5	262.1
2.	Sven Hannawald	Germany	130.0	125.0	261.5
3.	Matti Hautamäki	Finland	128.5	122.0	251.9
4.	Andreas Widhölzl	Austria	125.5	121.5	245.1
5.	Martin Schmitt	Germany	123.0	124.0	243.6
6.	Martin Höllwarth	Austria	122.5	122.5	241.5
7.	Martin Koch	Austria	117.0	129.5	240.2
8.	Wolfgang Loitzl	Austria	119.5	122.5	235.1
9.	Stefan Horngacher	Austria	124.0	121.0	233.5
10.	Robert Kranjec	Slovenia	117.5	125.0	232.5
11.	Risto Jussilainen	Finland	117.5	123.5	229.8
12.	Primož Peterka	Slovenia	118.0	121.0	225.2
13.	Andreas Goldberger	Austria	121.5	114.5	222.8
14.	Janne Ahonen	Finland	118.5	118.0	222.7
15.	Tomasz Pochwała	Poland	119.5	117.0	222,2
16.	Alexander Herr	Germany	120.5	115.0	218.4
17.	Tami Kiuru	Finland	121.5	111.5	213.9
18.	Stephan Hocke	Germany	117.0	115.5	212.5
19.	Robert Mateja	Poland	115.0	115.5	208.9
20.	Damjan Fras	Slovenia	117.0	113.5	206.9
21.	Blaž Vrhovnik	Slovenia	114.5	115.0	206.1
22.	Roar Ljøkelsøy	Norway	116.0	112.0	204.9
23.	Anders Bardal	Norway	120.5	106.5	204.1
24.	Veli-Matti Lindström	Finland	115.0	112.5	204.0
25.	Peter Žonta	Slovenia	113.5	114.5	203.9
26.	Igor Medved	Slovenia	116.0	111.0	201.6
27.	Lars Bystøl	Norway	113.0	112.0	201.0
28.	Marcin Bachleda	Poland	114.5	111.0	196.4
29.	Christof Duffner	Germany	113.5	108.0	189.7
30.	Dirk Else	Germany	115.5	91.0	155.2
31.	Roberto Cecon	Italy	113.0	–	99.9
32.	Sylvain Freiholz	Switzerland	112.5	–	99.0
33.	Wojciech Skupień	Poland	109.5	–	93.6
34.	Kristoffer Jåfs	Sweden	110.0	–	93.5
35.	Tomisław Tajner	Poland	109.0	–	92,2
36.	Håvard Lie	Norway	109.5	–	92.1
37.	Dmitry Zhuchikhin	Russia	107.5	–	90.0
38.	Georg Späth	Germany	108.0	–	89.4
39.	Michael Uhrmann	Germany	107.5	–	89.0
40.	Jakub Janda	Czech Republic	106.0	–	88.8
41.	Grzegorz Śliwka	Poland	106.0	–	86.8
42.	Andrzej Galica	Poland	106.0	–	85.8
43.	Toni Nieminen	Finland	105.5	–	84.9
44.	Jaroslav Sakala	Czech Republic	104.5	–	84.6
45.	Michal Doležal	Czech Republic	102.5	–	79.0
46.	Stefan Kaiser	Austria	99.5	–	73.6
47.	Krystian Długopolski	Poland	97.0	–	68.6
48.	Tommy Ingebrigtsen	Norway	94.0	–	61.2
49.	Łukasz Kruczek	Poland	94.5	–	59.1
50.	Paweł Kruczek	Poland	91.5	–	50.7

== Team line-ups ==
From the top 15 in the overall World Cup standings, Alan Alborn, Simon Ammann, and Kazuyoshi Funaki were absent from the start; before the competitions in Poland, they held the 15th, 8th, and 11th positions respectively.

Since Poland was the host of the event, it had the right to enter an additional 10 athletes in the qualifications from the so-called "national quota", granted for two competitions organized on home soil. Thus, 15 Polish representatives took part in the qualifications for each of the two competitions on Wielka Krokiew.

Athlete	Birth date	World Cup rank	Qualifying round		Main competition	
Athlete	Birth date	World Cup rank	19 January	20 January	19 January	20 January
Austria (7)
Stefan Kaiser	15 February 1983	–	–		29	46
Andreas Goldberger	29 November 1972	9	6	7	51	40
Stefan Horngacher	20 September 1969	14	14	17	35	9
Martin Höllwarth	13 April 1974	4	q	33	5	6
Martin Koch	22 January 1982	12	q	19	6	7
Andreas Widhölzl	14 October 1976	5	4	3	3	4
Wolfgang Loitzl	13 January 1980	44	21	13	10	8
Belarus (2)
Alexander Svetlov	8 April 1984	–	–		q	–
Andrey Lyskovets	7 October 1974	–	–		47	q
Bulgaria (1)
Georgi Zharkov	10 May 1976	–	–		q	q
Czech Republic (4)
Michal Doležal	11 March 1978	47	7	34	q	45
Jakub Janda	27 April 1978	20	30	31	49	40
Jan Matura	29 January 1980	–	–		39	q
Jaroslav Sakala	14 July 1969	–	34	40	33	44
Estonia (2)
Jouko Hein	23 February 1980	–	–		q	q
Jaan Jüris	23 June 1977	–	–		44	q
Finland (8)
Janne Ahonen	11 May 1977	22	2	2	34	14
Risto Jussilainen	10 June 1975	10	5	8	13	11
Matti Hautamäki	14 July 1981	3	DNSq	–	1	3
Jussi Hautamäki	20 April 1979	22	17	10	DNSq	–
Ville Kantee	8 December 1978	50	9	6	DNSq	–
Tami Kiuru	13 September 1976	31	–		37	17
Veli-Matti Lindström	15 November 1983	16	–		18	24
Toni Nieminen	31 May 1975	25	–		14	43
Germany (8)
Christof Duffner	16 December 1971	21	–		25	29
Dirk Else	27 August 1977	45	–		12	30
Sven Hannawald	9 November 1974	2	–		2	2
Alexander Herr	4 October 1978	36	27	23	28	16
Stephan Hocke	20 October 1983	6	–		19	18
Martin Schmitt	29 January 1978	7	1	1	4	5
Georg Späth	24 February 1981	28	–		21	38
Michael Uhrmann	16 September 1978	32	37	46	15	39
Norway (7)
Anders Bardal	24 August 1982	41	–		20	23
Tommy Ingebrigtsen	8 August 1977	38	10	21	q	48
Roar Ljøkelsøy	31 May 1976	34	28	36	38	22
Lars Bystøl	4 December 1978	–	–		24	27
Olav Magne Dønnem	21 November 1980	–	42	q	43	–
Håvard Lie	21 May 1975	–	–		–	36
Morten Solem	5 August 1980	–	–		31	q
Poland (15)
Adam Małysz	3 December 1977	1	13	38	7	1
Robert Mateja	5 October 1974	51	40	49	9	19
Tomasz Pochwała	7 May 1983	54	q	q	17	15
Wojciech Skupień	9 March 1976	62	46	q	40	33
Tomisław Tajner	14 May 1983	56	q	q	41	35
Daniel Bachleda	1 January 1981	–	–		q	q
Marcin Bachleda	4 September 1982	–	q	q	46	28
Krystian Długopolski	3 August 1980	–	q	q	q	47
Andrzej Galica	6 June 1980	–	–		q	42
Łukasz Kruczek	1 November 1975	–	q	44	26	49
Paweł Kruczek	1 January 1983	–	q	q	q	50
Maciej Maciusiak	28 March 1982	–	q	q	q	q
Grzegorz Sobczyk	10 February 1981	–	q	–	q	q
Grzegorz Śliwka	19 April 1982	–	q	q	48	41
Wojciech Tajner	24 June 1980	–	–	q	q	q
Russia (2)
Siergey Kozhevnikov	1 February 1982	–	–		q	q
Dmitry Zhuchikhin	28 November 1980	–	–		45	37
Slovakia (4)
Martin Mesík	17 October 1979	–	q	q	36	q
Dušan Oršula	23 August 1979	–	–	q	q	q
Matej Uram	30 May 1983	–	–		q	q
Ján Zelenčík	17 October 1979	–	q	q	q	q
Slovenia (7)
Damjan Fras	21 February 1973	30	49	26	21	20
Robert Kranjec	16 July 1981	26	–		8	10
Igor Medved	9 March 1981	51	–		30	26
Primož Peterka	28 February 1979	33	DNSq	DNSq	15	12
Jure Radelj	26 November 1977	–	–		q	q
Blaž Vrhovnik	8 May 1981	–	24	17	23	21
Peter Žonta	9 January 1979	17	18	16	10	25
Switzerland (2)
Sylvain Freiholz	23 November 1974	57	26	35	42	32
Marco Steinauer	13 April 1976	–	48	50	50	q
Sweden (1)
Kristoffer Jåfs	30 July 1980	51	–		32	34
Ukraine (2)
Volodymyr Boshchuk	3 August 1982	–	q	q	q	q
Ivan Kozlov	6 May 1978	–	q	q	q	q
Italy (1)
Roberto Cecon	28 December 1971	12	36	28	27	31

Legend:
q – Athlete did not qualify for the main competition
– – Athlete was not entered in the qualifying round
DNSq – Athlete was entered but did not start in the qualifying round
