= 2001–02 Four Hills Tournament =

Ski jumping competition

Four Hills Tournament at the 2001-02 FIS Ski Jumping World Cup
- Venues: Schattenbergschanze, Große Olympiaschanze, Bergiselschanze, Paul-Ausserleitner-Schanze
- Location: Germany, Austria
- Dates: 29 December 2001 – 6 January 2002
- Competitors: 108 from 23 nations

Medalists
gold medal	(Germany) Sven Hannawald
silver medal	(Finland) Matti Hautamäki
bronze medal	(Austria) Martin Höllwarth

The 50th edition of the annual Four Hills Tournament marked the first time an athlete won all four events of the tournament. In the past, fifteen times a ski jumper won three out of four events, but never the 'Grand Slam'. Sven Hannawald's feat would not be repeated until 2017-18 by Kamil Stoch.

== Format ==
At each of the four events, a qualification round was held. The 50 best jumpers qualified for the competition. The fifteen athletes leading the World Cup at the time qualified automatically. In case of an omitted qualification or a result that would normally result in elimination, they would instead qualify as 50th.

Unlike the procedure at normal World Cup events, the 50 qualified athletes were paired up for the first round of the final event, with the winner proceeding to the second round. The rounds start with the duel between #26 and #25 from the qualification round, followed by #27 vs #24, up to #50 vs #1. The five best duel losers, so-called 'Lucky Losers' also proceed.

For the tournament ranking, the total points earned from each jump are added together. The World Cup points collected during the four events are disregarded in this ranking.

== Pre-Tournament World Cup Standings ==
At the time of the tournament, nine out of twenty-eight World Cup events were already held. Title holder Adam Małysz had won six of them, a fourth place being his worst finish of the season so far. Thus, he went into the tournament as favourite.

The standings were as follows:

Rank	Name	Points
1.	(Poland) Adam Małysz	810
2.	(Germany) Sven Hannawald	399
3.	(Germany) Stephan Hocke	356
4.	(Austria) Martin Höllwarth	317
5.	(Finland) Matti Hautamäki	311
6.	(Germany) Martin Schmitt	297
7.	(Austria) Andreas Widhölzl	278
8.	(Japan) Kazuyoshi Funaki	268
9.	(Austria) Andreas Goldberger	265
10.	(Finland) Risto Jussilainen	259

== Participating nations and athletes ==
The number of jumpers a nation was allowed to nominate was dependent on previous results. At each event, a 'national group' of ten jumpers from the host country was added.

The defending champion was Adam Małysz. Six other competitors had also previously won the Four Hills tournament: Toni Nieminen in 1991-92, Andreas Goldberger in 1992-93 and 1994–95, Primož Peterka in 1996-97, Kazuyoshi Funaki in 1997-98, Janne Ahonen in 1998-99 and Andreas Widhölzl in 1999-00.

The following athletes were nominated:

Nation	Starting Spots	Number of Athletes	Athletes
Germany	8+10	18	Sven Hannawald, Stephan Hocke, Martin Schmitt, Christof Duffner, Alexander Herr, Michael Uhrmann, Georg Spaeth, Dirk Else; National Group: Frank Löffler, Jörg Ritzerfeld, Hansjörg Jäkle, Kai Bracht, Michael Neumayer, Roland Audenrieth, Maximilian Mechler, Michael Möllinger, Stefan Pieper, Leif Frey
Austria	8+10	18	Martin Höllwarth, Andreas Widhölzl, Andreas Goldberger, Martin Koch, Stefan Horngacher, Wolfgang Loitzl, Manuel Fettner, Stefan Thurnbichler (Garmisch-Partenkirchen onward); National Group: Markus Eigentler, Christian Nagiller, Reinhard Schwarzenberger, Stefan Kaiser, Bernhard Metzler, Bastian Kaltenböck, Andreas Kofler, Thomas Hörl, Gerhard Hofer, Balthasar Schneider
Bulgaria	1	1	Georgi Zharkov
Czech Republic	4	6	Jakub Janda, Michal Doležal, Jaroslav Sakala (until Garmisch-Partenkirchen), Jakub Jiroutek (until Garmisch-Partenkirchen), Jan Matura (Innsbruck onward), Jiří Parma (Innsbruck onward)
Estonia	2	2	Jaan Jüris, Jouko Hein
Finland	8	8	Matti Hautamäki, Risto Jussilainen, Veli-Matti Lindström, Jussi Hautamäki, Toni Nieminen, Tami Kiuru, Janne Ahonen, Janne Ylijärvi
France	3	3	Nicolas Dessum, Emmanuel Chedal, Rémi Santiago
Georgia	1	1	Kakhaber Tsakadze
Italy	1	1	Roberto Cecon
Japan	8	8	Kazuyoshi Funaki, Noriaki Kasai, Hideharu Miyahira, Masahiko Harada, Kazuya Yoshioka, Hiroki Yamada, Yasuhiro Shibata (Bischofshofen only), Teppei Takano (Bischofshofen only)
Kazakhstan	4	4	Stanislav Filimonov, Pawel Gaiduk, Maxim Polunin, Alexander Korobov (Innsbruck onward)
Kyrgyzstan	1	1	Dmitry Chvykov
Netherlands	1	1	Ingemar Mayr
Norway	5	5	Roar Ljøkelsøy, Tommy Ingebrigtsen, Anders Bardal, Olav Magne Dønnem, Henning Stensrud
Poland	5	5	Adam Małysz, Robert Mateja, Tomasz Pochwała, Tomisław Tajner, Wojciech Skupień
Russia	4	5	Valery Kobelev, Ildar Fatchullin, Anton Kalinitschenko, Alexander Belov
Slovakia	3	3	Martin Mesík, Dušan Oršula, Jan Zelencik (Oberstorf only)
Slovenia	6	6	Peter Žonta, Damjan Fras, Primož Peterka, Igor Medved, Robert Kranjec, Blaž Vrhovnik (Innsbruck onward)
South Korea	4	4	Kim Hyun-ki, Kang Chil-ku, Choi Yong-jik, Choi Heung-chul (all until Innsbruck)
Sweden	2	2	Kristoffer Jåfs, Johan Munters
Switzerland	4	4	Simon Ammann, Andreas Küttel, Sylvain Freiholz, Marco Steinauer (until Innsbruck)
United Kingdom	1	1	Glynn Pedersen
United States	2	2	Alan Alborn, Clint Jones

== Results ==
=== Oberstorf ===
(Germany) Schattenbergschanze, Oberstorf
29-30 December 2001

Qualification winner: (Austria) Andreas Widhölzl

Rank	Name	Points
1	(Germany) Sven Hannawald	260.2
2	(Austria) Martin Höllwarth	252.2
3	(Switzerland) Simon Ammann	248.7
4	(Finland) Matti Hautamäki	248.1
5	(Poland) Adam Małysz	245.1
6	(Austria) Andreas Widhölzl	239.7
7	(Finland) Risto Jussilainen	239.3
8	(Russia) Ildar Fatchullin	237.3
9	(Germany) Georg Spaeth	232.7
10	(Austria) Andreas Goldberger	232.4

=== Garmisch-Partenkirchen ===
(Germany) Große Olympiaschanze, Garmisch-Partenkirchen
31 December 2001 - 1 January 2002

Qualification winner: (Austria) Andreas Widhölzl

Rank	Name	Points
1	(Germany) Sven Hannawald	264.5
2	(Austria) Andreas Widhölzl	262.8
3	(Poland) Adam Małysz	259.7
4	(Japan) Hiroki Yamada	259.1
5	(Switzerland) Simon Ammann	253.9
6	(Finland) Matti Hautamäki	252.0
7	(Austria) Martin Höllwarth	245.3
8	(Germany) Martin Schmitt	243.3
8	(Russia) Valery Kobelev	243.3
10	(Austria) Martin Koch	241.5

=== Innsbruck ===
(Austria) Bergiselschanze, Innsbruck
03-4 January 2002

With a comfortable lead from the first half of the tournament already to his name, Sven Hannawald won by over 20 points in Innsbruck, all but securing him the title. In the event's first round, Hannawald beat his direct duel opponent Martin Höllwarth by eight meters - Höllwarth's jump was still the second best of the entire round.

Qualification winner: (Austria) Martin Höllwarth

Rank	Name	Points
1	(Germany) Sven Hannawald	270.0
2	(Poland) Adam Małysz	247.0
3	(Austria) Martin Höllwarth	244.1
4	(Finland) Matti Hautamäki	240.5
5	(Germany) Martin Schmitt	238.3
6	(Austria) Andreas Widhölzl	237.9
7	(Russia) Valery Kobelev	234.9
8	(Slovenia) Robert Kranjec	234.0
9	(Germany) Stephan Hocke	228.3
10	(Japan) Hideharu Miyahira	227.9

=== Bischofshofen ===
(Austria) Paul-Ausserleitner-Schanze, Bischofshofen
05-6 January 2002

With Hannawald's large lead after three events, the only hope for his rivals was a failure to proceed to the event's final round. Instead, the German yet again displayed the event's best jump in the first round and did not only secure tournament victory, but became the first athlete in the 50 years of Four Hills history to win all four events.

Qualification winner: (Finland) Matti Hautamäki

Rank	Name	Points
1	(Germany) Sven Hannawald	282.9
2	(Finland) Matti Hautamäki	280.4
3	(Austria) Martin Höllwarth	274.2
4	(Slovenia) Robert Kranjec	266.8
5	(Germany) Martin Schmitt	256.6
6	(United States) Alan Alborn	256.2
7	(Italy) Roberto Cecon	247.8
8	(Slovenia) Peter Žonta	247.6
9	(Poland) Adam Małysz	241.0
10	(Austria) Andreas Goldberger	240.9

== Final ranking ==
Rank	Name	Oberstorf	Garmisch-Partenkirchen	Innsbruck	Bischofshofen	Points
1	(Germany) Sven Hannawald	1st	1st	1st	1st	1077.6
2	(Finland) Matti Hautamäki	4th	6th	4th	2nd	1021.0
3	(Austria) Martin Höllwarth	2nd	7th	3rd	3rd	1015.8
4	(Poland) Adam Małysz	5th	3rd	2nd	9th	992.8
5	(Austria) Andreas Widhölzl	6th	2nd	6th	12th	980.4
6	(Switzerland) Simon Ammann	3rd	5th	11th	15th	961.4
7	(Germany) Martin Schmitt	19th	8th	5th	5th	957.5
8	(Finland) Risto Jussilainen	7th	20th	15th	13th	923.6
9	(Austria) Andreas Goldberger	10th	22nd	17th	10th	918.5
10	(Germany) Stephan Hocke	21st	11th	9th	17th	914.8
