= Ski jumping at the 2002 Winter Olympics – Large hill team =

Men's large hill team at the XIX Olympic Winter Games
- Pictogram for ski jumping
- Venue: Park City
- Dates: February 18, 2002
- Competitors: 52 from 13 nations
- Winning score: 974.1

Medalists
1st place, gold medalist(s)		Germany; Sven Hannawald, Stephan Hocke, Michael Uhrmann, Martin Schmitt
2nd place, silver medalist(s)		Finland; Matti Hautamäki, Veli-Matti Lindström, Risto Jussilainen, Janne Ahonen
3rd place, bronze medalist(s)		Slovenia; Damjan Fras, Primož Peterka, Robert Kranjec, Peter Žonta

The Men's large hill team ski jumping competition for the 2002 Winter Olympics was held in Park City. It occurred on 18 February.

== Results ==
Rank	Team	Jump 1	Jump 2	Total
1st place, gold medalist(s)	Germany; Sven Hannawald; Stephan Hocke; Michael Uhrmann; Martin Schmitt	498.8; 121.9; 109.8; 129.4; 137.7	475.3; 116.9; 113.1; 124.0; 121.3	974.1; 238.8; 222.9; 253.4; 259.0
2nd place, silver medalist(s)	Finland; Matti Hautamäki; Veli-Matti Lindström; Risto Jussilainen; Janne Ahonen	489.1; 126.8; 105.0; 123.6; 133.7	484.9; 122.5; 107.7; 127.8; 126.9	974.0; 249.3; 212.7; 251.4; 260.6
3rd place, bronze medalist(s)	Slovenia; Damjan Fras; Primož Peterka; Robert Kranjec; Peter Žonta	483.9; 112.5; 112.8; 140.4; 118.2	462.4; 97.9; 118.7; 124.1; 121.7	946.3; 210.4; 231.5; 264.5; 239.9
4	Austria; Stefan Horngacher; Andreas Widhölzl; Wolfgang Loitzl; Martin Höllwarth	472.4; 116.8; 115.5; 121.4; 118.7	454.4; 104.9; 108.6; 118.5; 122.4	926.8; 221.7; 224.1; 239.9; 241.1
5	Japan; Masahiko Harada; Hiroki Yamada; Hideharu Miyahira; Kazuyoshi Funaki	465.5; 115.6; 96.3; 125.9; 127.7	460.5; 104.1; 110.5; 118.6; 127.3	926.0; 219.7; 206.8; 244.5; 255.0
6	Poland; Robert Mateja; Tomisław Tajner; Tomasz Pochwała; Adam Małysz	435.2; 104.1; 90.2; 108.6; 132.3	412.9; 87.3; 93.1; 109.8; 122.7	848.1; 191.4; 183.3; 218.4; 255.0
7	Switzerland; Marco Steinauer; Sylvain Freiholz; Andreas Küttel; Simon Ammann	417.8; 74.1; 92.2; 118.2; 133.3	400.5; 66.3; 79.5; 118.2; 136.5	818.3; 140.4; 171.7; 236.4; 269.8
8	South Korea; Choi Heung-Chul; Choi Yong-Jik; Kim Hyeon-Gi; Gang Chil-Gu	395.6; 98.5; 95.8; 97.7; 103.6	406.0; 104.9; 95.4; 88.1; 117.6	801.6; 203.4; 191.2; 185.8; 221.2
9	Norway; Tommy Ingebrigtsen; Lars Bystøl; Anders Bardal; Roar Ljøkelsøy	404.5; 93.9; 96.7; 115.8; 98.1	386.3; 92.1; 78.0; 109.0; 107.2	790.8; 186.0; 174.7; 224.8; 205.3
10	France; Emmanuel Chedal; Rémi Santiago; Florentin Durand; Nicolas Dessum	370.7; 90.3; 106.6; 73.5; 100.3	384.4; 103.0; 99.8; 76.3; 105.3	755.1; 193.3; 206.4; 149.8; 205.6
11	United States; Brian Welch; Tommy Schwall; Clint Jones; Alan Alborn	372.8; 63.9; 84.0; 109.5; 115.4	355.6; 60.3; 78.6; 102.7; 114.0	728.4; 124.2; 162.6; 212.2; 229.4
12	Czech Republic; Jan Matura; Michal Doležal; Jan Mazoch; Jakub Janda	368.0; 72.7; 88.1; 113.6; 93.6	356.6; 64.9; 78.1; 96.7; 116.9	724.6; 137.6; 166.2; 210.3; 210.5
13	Kazakhstan; Maksim Polunin; Stanislav Filimonov; Aleksandr Korobov; Pavel Gayduk	265.4; 0.0; 99.8; 77.7; 87.9	355.7; 94.4; 97.1; 65.3; 98.9	621.1; 94.4; 196.9; 143.0; 186.8
