= Ski jumping at the 2002 Winter Olympics – Large hill individual =

Men's large hill individual at the XIX Olympic Winter Games
- Pictogram for ski jumping
- Venue: Park City
- Dates: February 12 & 13, 2002
- Competitors: 66 from 21 nations
- winning score: 281.4

Medalists
1st place, gold medalist(s)		Simon Ammann; Switzerland
2nd place, silver medalist(s)		Adam Małysz; Poland
3rd place, bronze medalist(s)		Matti Hautamäki; Finland

The men's large hill individual ski jumping competition for the 2002 Winter Olympics was held in Park City, United States. The competition went for two days, with the qualifying round on February 12 and the final rounds on February 13.

== Results ==
=== Qualifying ===
Fourteen skiers were pre-qualified, on the basis of their World Cup performance, meaning that they directly advanced to the final round. These skiers still jumped in the qualifying round, but they were not included with non-pre-qualified skiers in the standings. The fifty-two skiers who were not pre-qualified competed for thirty-six spots in the final round.

Rank	Name	Country	Score	Notes
1	Robert Kranjec	Slovenia	119.1	
2	Masahiko Harada	Japan	116.1	
3	Veli-Matti Lindström	Finland	114.3	
4	Alan Alborn	United States	114.1	
5	Robert Mateja	Poland	111.4	
6	Michael Uhrmann	Germany	111.2	
7	Janne Ahonen	Finland	111.0	
8	Andreas Küttel	Switzerland	109.6	
9	Primož Peterka	Slovenia	105.3	
10	Nicolas Dessum	France	104.4	
11	Valery Kobelev	Russia	103.6	
12	Kim Hyun-Ki	South Korea	102.7	
13	Ildar Fatchullin	Russia	102.3	
14	Noriaki Kasai	Japan	101.9	
15	Damjan Fras	Slovenia	100.8	
16	Anders Bardal	Norway	99.5	
16	Jens Salumäe	Estonia	99.5	
18	Tomisław Tajner	Poland	98.0	
19	Hideharu Miyahira	Japan	97.7	
20	Tommy Ingebrigtsen	Norway	97.6	
21	Emmanuel Chedal	France	97.3	
22	Clint Jones	United States	97.2	
23	Roar Ljøkelsøy	Norway	96.8	
23	Jan Mazoch	Czech Republic	96.8	
25	Stanislav Filimonov	Kazakhstan	96.3	
26	Tomasz Pochwała	Poland	94.4	
27	Sylvain Freiholz	Switzerland	93.6	
28	Maxim Polunin	Kazakhstan	92.2	
29	Jakub Janda	Czech Republic	89.4	
30	Lars Bystøl	Norway	88.5	
30	Dmitry Chvykov	Kyrgyzstan	88.5	
32	Choi Yong-Jik	South Korea	85.8	
33	Rémi Santiago	France	84.0	
34	Aleksandr Belov	Russia	83.0	
35	Marco Steinauer	Switzerland	82.1	
36	Kang Chil-Gu	South Korea	81.0	
37	Jan Matura	Czech Republic	79.5	
38	Pavel Gayduk	Kazakhstan	76.2	
39	Georgi Zharkov	Bulgaria	75.3	
40	Jaan Jüris	Estonia	74.4	
41	Choi Heung-Chul	South Korea	73.1	
41	Michal Doležal	Czech Republic	73.1	
43	Brendon Doran	United States	68.1	
44	Florentin Durand	France	66.7	
45	Andrey Lyskovets	Belarus	66.3	
46	Aleksandr Korobov	Kazakhstan	65.2	
47	Anton Kalinichenko	Russia	61.3	
48	Glynn Pedersen	Great Britain	56.3	
49	Volodymyr Hlyvka	Ukraine	54.9	
50	Kakha Tsakadze	Georgia	54.0	
51	Tommy Schwall	United States	44.0	
52	Tambet Pikkor	Estonia	39.0	
*	Adam Małysz	Poland	120.8	
*	Sven Hannawald	Germany	119.1	
*	Roberto Cecon	Italy	118.0	
*	Matti Hautamäki	Finland	117.3	
*	Kazuyoshi Funaki	Japan	112.4	
*	Simon Ammann	Switzerland	110.6	
*	Stefan Horngacher	Austria	107.6	
*	Andreas Widhölzl	Austria	103.6	
*	Peter Žonta	Slovenia	103.5	
*	Stephan Hocke	Germany	100.8	
*	Martin Schmitt	Germany	99.4	
*	Martin Koch	Austria	99.0	
*	Martin Höllwarth	Austria	95.9	
*	Risto Jussilainen	Finland	87.1	

1: These skiers were pre-qualified; they did perform jumps in the qualification round, but were not ranked with the non-pre-qualified jumpers.

=== Final ===
The final consisted of two jumps, with the top thirty after the first jump qualifying for the second jump. The combined total of the two jumps was used to determine the final ranking.

Rank	Name	Country	Jump 1	Rank	Jump 2	Rank	Total
Gold medal	Simon Ammann	Switzerland	140.5	1	140.9	1	281.4
Silver medal	Adam Małysz	Poland	137.3	3	132.4	2	269.7
Bronze medal	Matti Hautamäki	Finland	129.1	4	126.9	3	256.0
4	Sven Hannawald	Germany	140.5	1	114.8	11	255.3
5	Stefan Horngacher	Austria	123.5	9	123.7	4	247.2
6	Andreas Küttel	Switzerland	125.0	8	120.6	6	245.6
7	Kazuyoshi Funaki	Japan	128.7	5	116.8	9	245.5
8	Martin Koch	Austria	126.3	7	118.2	8	244.5
9	Janne Ahonen	Finland	119.2	16	122.3	5	241.5
10	Martin Schmitt	Germany	127.3	6	113.1	13	240.4
11	Robert Kranjec	Slovenia	118.1	17	119.5	7	237.6
12	Stephan Hocke	Germany	123.5	9	113.4	12	236.9
13	Peter Žonta	Slovenia	121.2	12	113.0	14	234.2
14	Martin Höllwarth	Austria	122.3	11	111.0	18	233.3
15	Primož Peterka	Slovenia	120.9	13	112.1	17	233.0
16	Michael Uhrmann	Germany	120.2	14	112.2	16	232.4
17	Valery Kobelev	Russia	115.3	19	116.2	10	231.5
18	Risto Jussilainen	Finland	116.7	18	109.5	20	226.2
19	Roberto Cecon	Italy	113.0	23	112.6	15	225.6
20	Masahiko Harada	Japan	115.1	20	107.7	21	222.8
21	Andreas Widhölzl	Austria	114.9	21	107.7	21	222.6
22	Damjan Fras	Slovenia	119.9	15	101.3	25	221.2
23	Nicolas Dessum	France	110.3	27	109.8	19	220.1
24	Hideharu Miyahira	Japan	108.6	29	106.8	23	215.4
25	Anders Bardal	Norway	110.3	27	102.6	24	212.9
26	Tommy Ingebrigtsen	Norway	110.7	25	97.1	26	207.8
27	Sylvain Freiholz	Switzerland	110.4	26	95.4	27	205.8
28	Emmanuel Chedal	France	111.3	24	93.6	28	204.9
29	Robert Mateja	Poland	108.6	29	93.6	28	202.2
30	Stanislav Filimonov	Kazakhstan	114.9	21	82.5	30	197.4
31	Kim Hyun-Ki	South Korea	108.5	31	—	—	
32	Roar Ljøkelsøy	Norway	107.2	32	—	—	
33	Rémi Santiago	France	106.1	33	—	—	
34	Alan Alborn	United States	105.4	34	—	—	
35	Ildar Fatchullin	Russia	103.1	35	—	—	
36	Jan Mazoch	Czech Republic	102.7	36	—	—	
37	Veli-Matti Lindström	Finland	102.1	37	—	—	
38	Lars Bystøl	Norway	99.4	38	—	—	
39	Dmitry Chvykov	Kyrgyzstan	98.4	39	—	—	
39	Tomisław Tajner	Poland	98.4	39	—	—	
41	Noriaki Kasai	Japan	97.5	41	—	—	
42	Clint Jones	United States	94.4	42	—	—	
43	Tomasz Pochwała	Poland	93.9	43	—	—	
44	Jakub Janda	Czech Republic	91.3	44	—	—	
45	Marco Steinauer	Switzerland	87.2	45	—	—	
46	Choi Yong-Jik	South Korea	86.7	46	—	—	
47	Kang Chil-Gu	South Korea	83.2	47	—	—	
48	Maxim Polunin	Kazakhstan	83.1	48	—	—	
49	Jens Salumäe	Estonia	78.9	49	—	—	
50	Aleksandr Belov	Russia	66.7	50	—	—	
