= Gilles Marguet =

French biathlete (born 1967)

Medal record

Men's biathlon

Representing France

Olympic Games
Bronze medal – third place	2002 Salt Lake City	4 × 7.5 km relay

World Championships
Gold medal – first place	2001 Pokljuka	4 × 7.5 km relay
Bronze medal – third place	1993 Borovets	Team event

Gilles Marguet (born 3 December 1967 in Pontarlier, Doubs) is a retired French biathlete.

He was born in Pontarlier. At the 2002 Winter Olympics in Salt Lake City, he won a bronze medal with the French relay team, in 4 × 7.5 km relay.
