= Apoloniusz Tajner =

Polish Nordic combined skier and coach

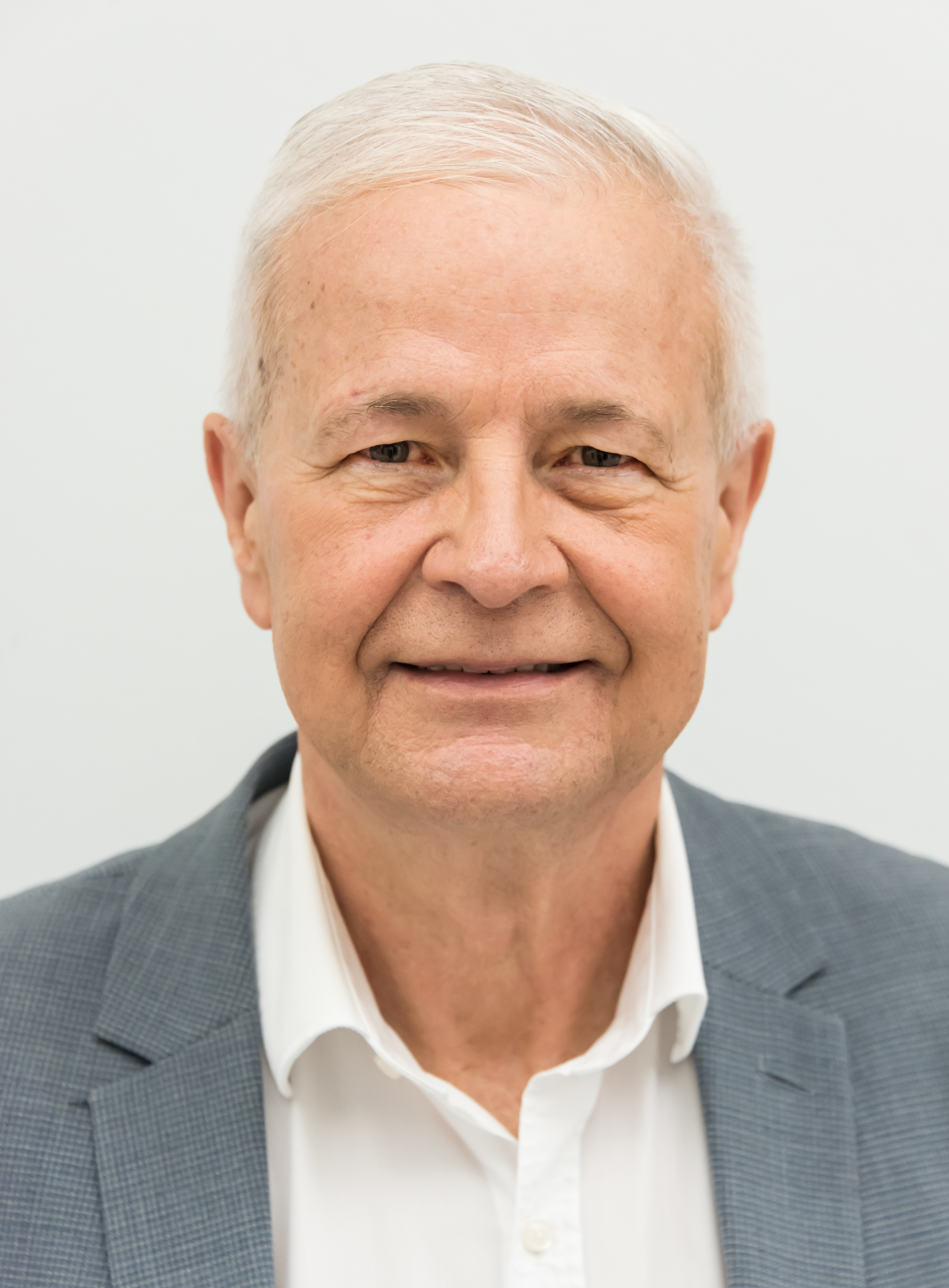
Apoloniusz Tajner in 2023

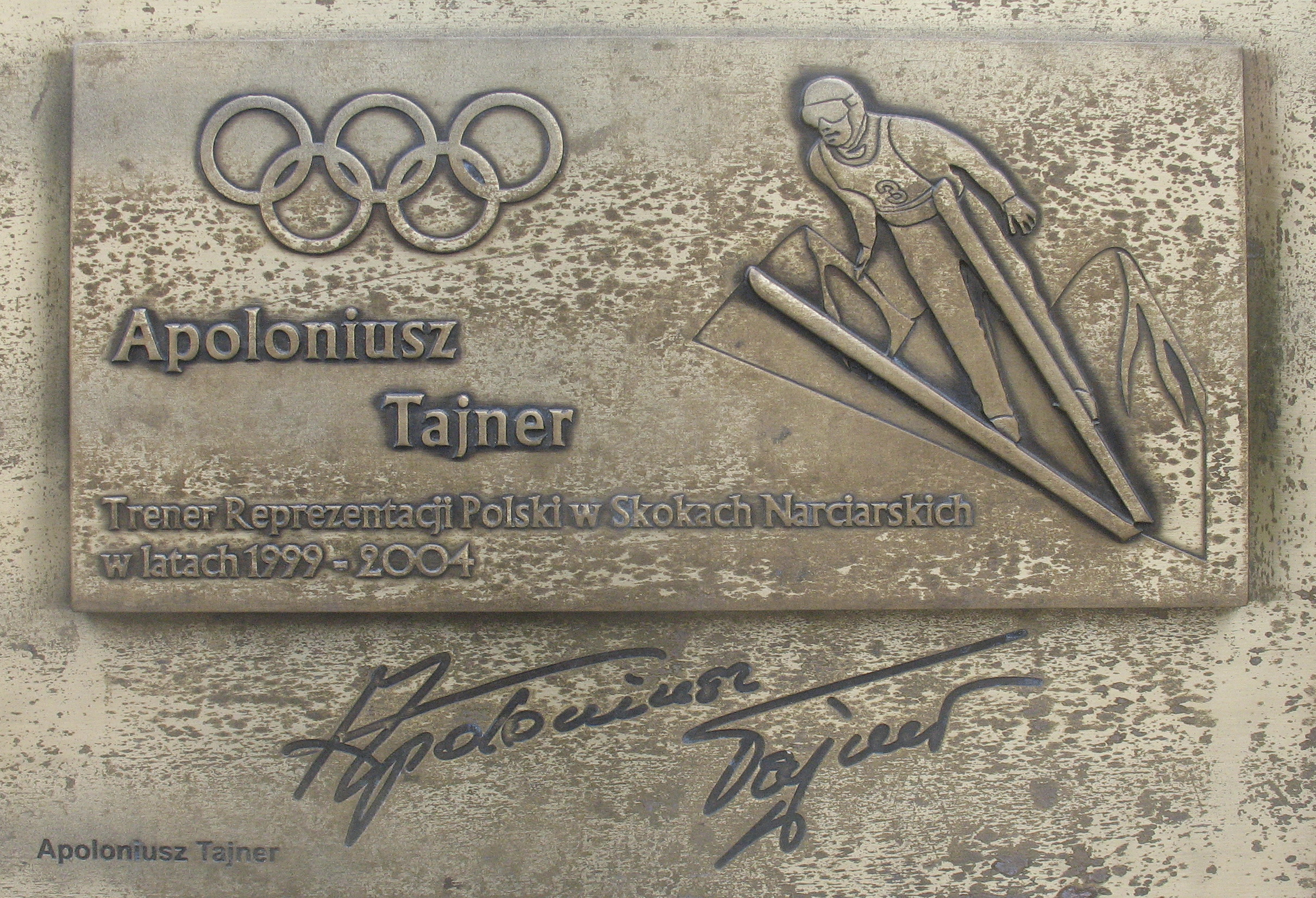
Apoloniusz Tajner copy of the autograph and medal in Avenue of Sport Stars in Dziwnów

Apoloniusz Leopold Tajner (born 17 April 1954) is a Polish former Nordic combined skier and former coach of the Polish national ski jumping team. He is the current president of the Polish Ski Federation.

== Personal life ==
Apoloniusz Tajner was born on 17 April 1954 in Goleszów, Poland. In 1980 he graduated from Akademia Wychowania Fizycznego in Kraków.

His son, Tomisław Tajner is a ski jumper and his father, Leopold Tajner was a famous sportsman in Poland. His daughter Dominika Tajner-Idzik has one son, Maksymilian, and is married to Polish vocalist Michał Wiśniewski. He is married with Izabela Tajner.

== Sports career ==
Tajner's personal best in ski jumping is 109 m. As a Nordic combined skier he won Junior Polish Championships and was placed 5th in World Junior Championships. Tajner was the coach of Polish Nordic combined team from 1984 to 1990. From 1999 to 2004 he coached Polish ski jumping team. During this time Adam Małysz has won most of his trophies, including winning 3 times World Cup in ski jumping (2000/01, 2001/02 and 2002/03), winning Four Hills Tournament in 2000/01, and winning 3 times individual championship in ski jumping (2001 and 2003 at normal hill and 2003 at large hill). Since 2006 Tajner is president of the Polish Ski Federation.

== Political career ==
In the 2023 Polish parliamentary election, he was elected to the Sejm from Civic Platform in Bielsko-Biała I.
