= Andrzej Galica =

Polish ski jumper and sports official

Personal information
- Nationality: Poland
- Born: June 6, 1980 (age 46)

Sport
- Sport: Skiing
- Club: WKS Zakopane

Andrzej Galica (born 6 June 1980) is a Polish former ski jumper and current sports official. He won two team medals at the Polish Ski Jumping Championships in 1997 and 2000, secured two Polish junior championship titles, and competed in three Junior World Championships. Galica participated in one Ski Jumping World Cup main event on 20 January 2002 in Zakopane, finishing 42nd. He earned points in the 1997–98 Continental Cup, with his best result being 9th place in Zakopane. After retiring, he became a ski jumping judge.

== Career ==
During his junior years, Galica regularly competed in the School League in Zakopane, debuting in the 1988–89 season. In the 1990–91 season, he achieved his first podium, placing 3rd. The following winter, he consistently finished 2nd, trailing only Krystian Długopolski. On 20 February 1992, he was 3rd in the "1980 and younger" category at the Little Bronisław Czech and Helena Marusarzówna Memorial. In March, he placed 18th at the national youth championships. The next season, he earned one School League podium and finished 10th and 11th at the youth championships. In the 1993–94 season, he secured four School League podiums and placed 6th and 4th at the youth championships.

=== 1994–95 ===
In January 1995, Galica competed in the Tatra Ski Association Championships. He placed 7th in his age group on the Mała Krokiew, 28th in the open competition on the Średnia Krokiew, and 33rd on the Wielka Krokiew with jumps of 68.5 m and 62.5 m. At the 1995 Polish Championships on the normal hill at the Zdzisław Hryniewiecki Ski Jumping Hill in Szczyrk, he finished 29th overall and 22nd among juniors. He won a silver medal at the junior national championships on the normal hill, again trailing Długopolski. On the medium hill, he placed 8th. At the senior national championships on 1 April at the Wielka Krokiew, he finished 19th among Polish competitors (37th including foreign athletes).

=== 1995–96 ===
In mid-January, he won his age category at the Tatra Ski Association Championships on all three hills: Mała, Średnia, and Wielka Krokiew. Among seniors, he placed 4th on the normal hill and 3rd on the large hill with jumps of 99 m and 97.5 m (6th including foreign competitors).

Galica entered two World Cup events in Zakopane on 27 and 28 January but failed to qualify for the main competitions. On 30 January, he competed in the team event at the 1996 Junior World Championships in Gallio, Italy, jumping 82 m and 83 m, with his team finishing 12th. In the individual event, he placed 37th with jumps of 79.5 m and 84 m.

At the 1996 Polish Championships on 22 March, his WKS Zakopane team finished 4th, missing bronze by two points. The next day, he was 9th on the normal hill and 13th on the large hill. At an Easter competition on the Wielka Krokiew, he placed 9th.

=== 1996–97 ===
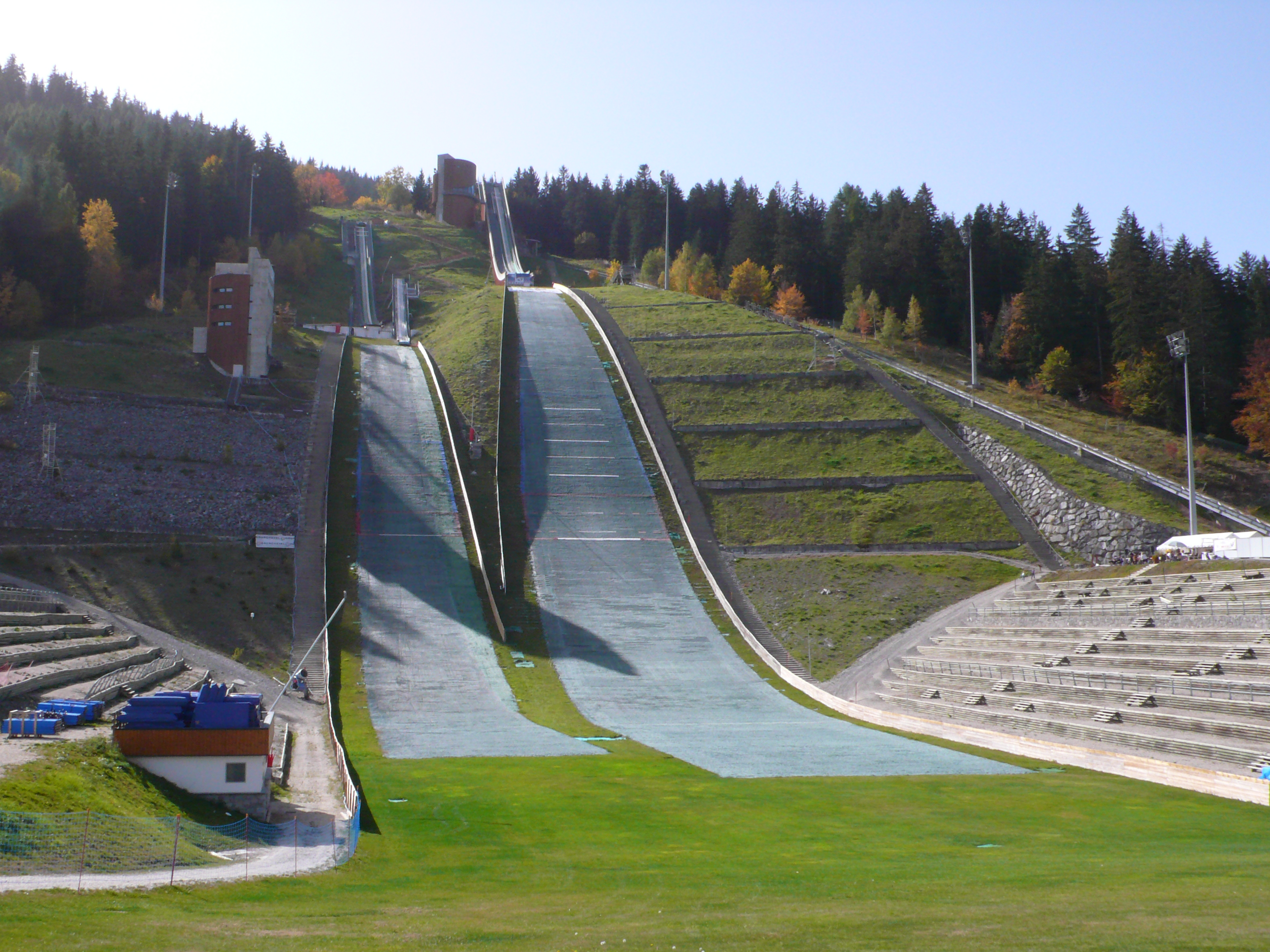
Tremplin Le Praz, where Galica achieved his best Continental Cup result of the season

In October, Galica finished 5th at the 1996 Summer Polish Championships with two 71.5 m jumps, placing 13th when including foreign competitors. In his age group, he was 2nd.

In December in Wisła, he finished 18th in the international Beskid Cup.

On 12 February, he competed in the team event at the 1997 Junior World Championships in Canmore, Canada, jumping 63.5 m and 72.5 m, with his team placing 13th. In the individual event on 15 February, he was 29th with jumps of 78 m and 79 m.

In March in Braunlage, he placed 48th in one Continental Cup event and failed to qualify for the second. In Courchevel, he achieved his season-best results, placing 34th (81 m and 83.5 m) and 35th (84 m and 86 m). He ended the season without points after failing to qualify in Harrachov. On 26 March at the 1997 Polish Championships, his WKS Zakopane team, with Robert Mateja and Wojciech Skupień, won the team title on the Średnia Krokiew.

=== 1997–98 ===
On 28 June in Velenje, Galica placed 41st in the 1997–98 Continental Cup. On 20 July, he was 18th in the Zakopane Mayor's Cup, and on 8 August, he placed 9th in a competition marking BBTS Bielsko's 90th anniversary in Szczyrk.

On 14 August in Courchevel, he competed in his only Summer Grand Prix event, jumping 106 m and 94.5 m to finish 27th, earning four points and placing 46th in the season standings. In Zakopane's Continental Cup, he achieved his career-best 9th place (81.5 m and 80.5 m) and was 19th the next day (83 m and 76.5 m). In Frenštát pod Radhoštěm, he placed 27th and 28th, but did not score in Hakuba.

At the 1997 Summer Polish Championships on 12 October, he finished 35th among Polish competitors on the Średnia Krokiew.

From November to January, he entered several 1997–98 World Cup events but failed to qualify for any main competitions, placing 59th and 49th in Lillehammer, 53rd in Predazzo, 55th in Villach, 59th in Harrachov, and 50th and 53rd in Zakopane.

On 22 January, he competed in the team event at the 1998 Junior World Championships in Sankt Moritz, Switzerland, jumping 76.5 m and 88 m, with his team placing 11th; his score was the highest in the Polish team. In the individual event, he was 49th with jumps of 74 m and 74.5 m.

In February, he competed in Continental Cup events in Villach (50th) and Planica (52nd). At the 1998 Polish Championships, he placed 16th on the normal hill and 8th among Poles (15th overall) on the Wielka Krokiew with jumps of 92 m and 85 m.

=== 1998–99 ===
In July 1998, Galica competed in the Erzgebirgs-Springertournee in Germany, placing 35th in Klingenthal, 22nd in Pöhla, and 45th in Oberwiesenthal. Later that month, he was 37th in the Zakopane Mayor's Cup.

In August, he competed in two 1998–99 Continental Cup events in Zakopane, finishing 39th and 43rd, his only FIS events that season.

At the 1998 Summer Polish Championships in October, he placed 27th among Polish competitors. In the Christmas Tatra Ski Association Championships, he was 9th. On 24 March 1999, he earned a bronze medal in the SMS Cup on the Wielka Krokiew. In February, he placed in the 20s at the Silesian Championships. At the 1999 Polish Championships, he was 34th and 26th. In March, he finished 31st in the international Waldemar Wolwowicz Cup on the Wielka Krokiew.

=== 1999–2000 ===
In the 1999–2000 Continental Cup, Galica failed to qualify for both summer events in Zakopane. He placed 33rd in the Zakopane Mayor's Cup and 20th in the Frenštát Grand Prix in September. That month, he finished 4th in the Internationaler Deutscher Sommercup in Klingenthal.

At the 1999 Summer Polish Championships on 10 October, he placed 31st among Poles (58th overall). In December's Tatra Ski Association Championships, he placed 14th and 11th. In January's Silesian Championships, he was 11th and 15th. In March, he finished 9th at the senior SMS Championships on the Wielka Krokiew.

At the 2000 Polish Championships on 25–26 March in Zakopane, Galica placed 10th on the normal hill with jumps of 77.5 m and 77 m. His WKS Zakopane team, with Wojciech Skupień and Daniel Bachleda, won silver in the team event, trailing KS Wisła by 36 points. On the large hill, he achieved a career-best 5th place with jumps of 117 m and 109 m, missing the podium by 29.5 points.

=== Later seasons ===
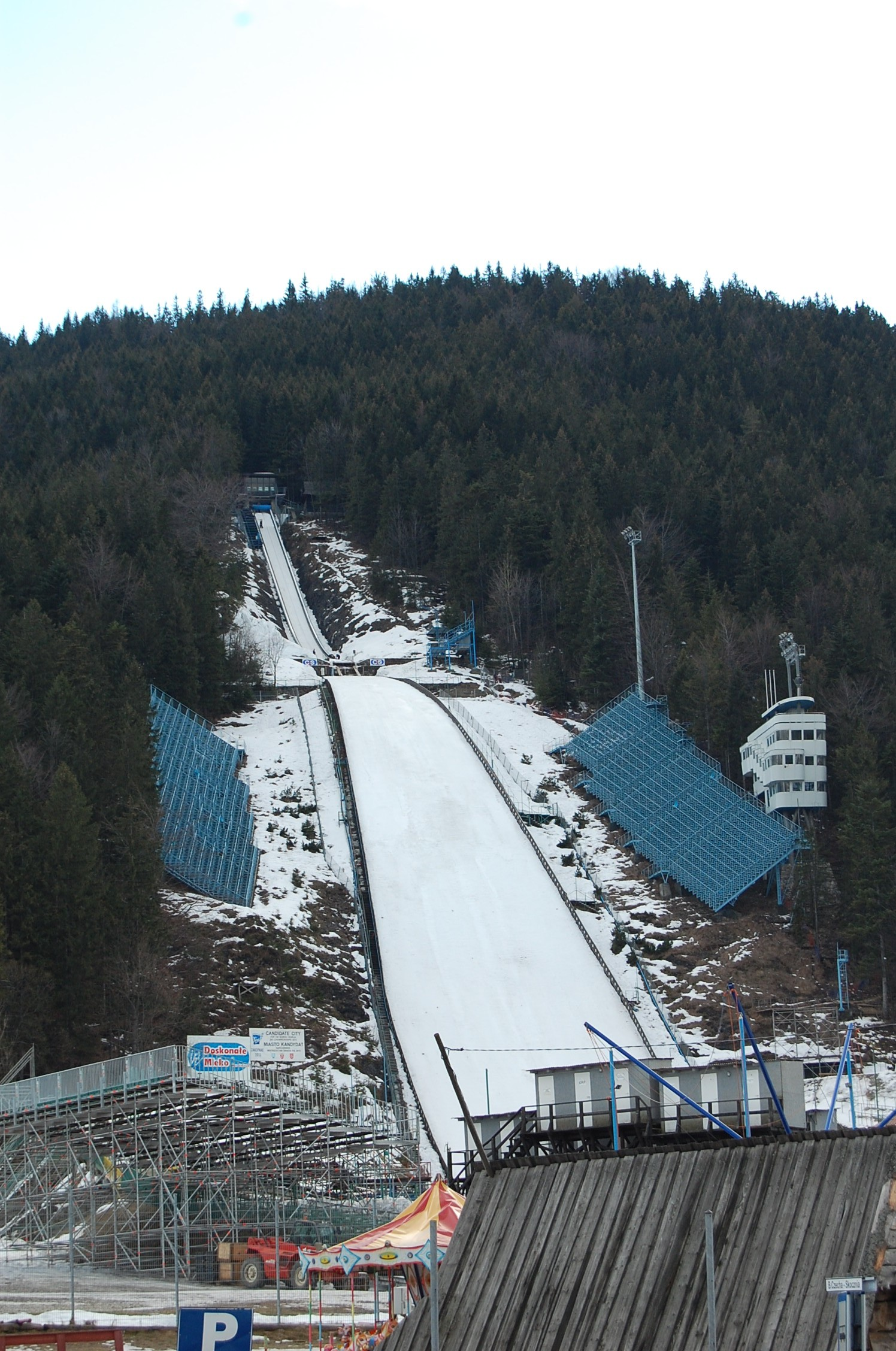
Wielka Krokiew, where Galica competed in his only World Cup main event

In the 2000–01 season, Galica did not participate in major international or national competitions.

In the 2001–02 World Cup in Zakopane on 19–20 January, he qualified for the main event on the second day, jumping 106 m to finish 42nd, his only World Cup main event appearance. In February, he competed in two Continental Cup events in Braunlage, placing 42nd and 32nd. At the 2002 Polish Championships on 27 March, he was 23rd on the Średnia Krokiew and 6th in the team event with WKS Zakopane's second team.

On 29 September at the 2002 Summer Polish Championships, he placed 13th. At the Christmas championships on the Wielka Krokiew, he finished 64th with the shortest jump, earning a negative score. In the Tatra Ski Association Championships, he placed 14th and 52nd.

In February 2003, he competed in several 2002–03 Continental Cup events in Zakopane, Brotterode, and Lauscha, with his best result being 33rd in Zakopane. At the 2003 Polish Championships, he was 35th individually and 4th in the team event with WKS Zakopane's second team.

On 16 January 2005, he placed 20th at the Tatra Ski Association Championships on the large hill. At the 2005 Polish Championships on 25 January in Szczyrk, his team placed 4th. On 8 February, he was 31st among Poles (33rd overall) on the Wielka Krokiew.

=== Post-career ===
Galica is a ski jumping judge, officiating at events including the FIS Ski Flying World Cup, World Cup events, 2014 Junior World Championships, Continental Cup, FIS Cup, Carpathian Cup, and Polish Championships.

In October 2013, he was one of 12 Polish judges certified to officiate top FIS events.

== World Cup ==
=== Individual World Cup results ===
Source
1995–96 Season
Lillehammer	Lillehammer	Villach	Planica	Predazzo	Chamonix	Chamonix	Oberhof	Oberstdorf	Garmisch-Partenkirchen	Innsbruck	Bischofshofen	Engelberg	Engelberg	Sapporo	Sapporo	Zakopane	Zakopane	Bad Mitterndorf	Bad Mitterndorf	Iron Mountain	Iron Mountain	Kuopio	Lahti	Lahti	Harrachov	Falun	Oslo	Points
-	-	-	-	-	-	-	-	-	-	-	-	-	-	-	-	q	q	-	-	-	-	-	-	-	-	-	-	0
1997–98 Season
Lillehammer	Lillehammer	Predazzo	Villach	Harrachov	Engelberg	Engelberg	Oberstdorf	Garmisch-Partenkirchen	Innsbruck	Bischofshofen	Ramsau	Zakopane	Zakopane	Oberstdorf	Oberstdorf	Sapporo	Vikersund	Vikersund	Kuopio	Lahti	Lahti	Falun	Trondheim	Oslo	Planica	Planica	Points	
q	q	q	q	q	-	-	-	-	-	-	-	q	q	-	-	-	-	-	-	-	-	-	-	-	-	-	0	
2001–02 Season
Kuopio	Kuopio	Titisee-Neustadt	Titisee-Neustadt	Villach	Engelberg	Engelberg	Predazzo	Predazzo	Oberstdorf	Garmisch-Partenkirchen	Innsbruck	Bischofshofen	Willingen	Zakopane	Zakopane	Hakuba	Sapporo	Lahti	Falun	Trondheim	Oslo	Points						
-	-	-	-	-	-	-	-	-	-	-	-	-	-	q	42	-	-	-	-	-	-	0						
Legend
1 2 3 4-10 11-30 Below 30 dq – Disqualified q – Disqualified in qualifications q – Did not qualify: – Did not compete

== Summer Grand Prix ==
=== Overall standings ===
Season	Place
1997	46.

=== Individual Summer Grand Prix results ===
Source
1997
Courchevel	Trondheim	Hinterzarten	Predazzo	Stams	Points
27	-	-	-	-	4
Legend
1 2 3 4-10 11-30 Below 30 dq – Disqualified q – Did not qualify: – Did not compete

== Continental Cup ==
=== Individual Continental Cup results ===
Source
1996–97 Season
Courchevel	Zakopane	Frenštát pod Radhoštěm	Hakuba	Hakuba	Muju	Muju	Chaux-Neuve	Chaux-Neuve	Brotterode	Lauscha	Sankt Moritz	Lake Placid	Lake Placid	Ramsau	Villach	Planica	Sapporo	Sapporo	Sapporo	Oberhof	Oberhof	Štrbské Pleso	Zakopane	Reit im Winkl	Westby	Westby	Saalfelden	Ruhpolding	Iron Mountain	Iron Mountain	Ishpeming	Ishpeming	Sapporo	Braunlage	Braunlage	Zaō	Zaō	Vikersund	Vikersund	Courchevel	Courchevel	Harrachov	Harrachov	Ruka	Rovaniemi	Points					
-	-	-	-	-	-	-	50	-	q	49	47	-	-	46	q	42	-	-	-	q	q	q	49	-	-	-	-	-	-	-	-	-	-	48	q	-	-	-	-	34	35	q	q	-	-	0					
1997–98 Season
Velenje	Rælingen	Zakopane	Zakopane	Frenštát pod Radhoštěm	Frenštát pod Radhoštěm	Oberhof	Oberhof	Hakuba	Hakuba	Chamonix	Chamonix	Lahti	Lahti	Lahti	Oberwiesenthal	Oberwiesenthal	Sankt Moritz	Sapporo	Sapporo	Sapporo	Garmisch-Partenkirchen	Garmisch-Partenkirchen	Liberec	Liberec	Villach	Westby	Westby	Planica	Planica	Reit im Winkl	Iron Mountain	Iron Mountain	Saalfelden	Ruhpolding	Oslo	Willingen	Willingen	Ishpeming	Ishpeming	Schönwald	Schönwald	Sapporo	Zaō	Zaō	Courchevel	Courchevel	Rovaniemi	Ruka	Ruka	Points	
41	-	9	19	27	28	39	16	43	44	-	-	-	-	-	-	-	-	-	-	-	-	-	-	-	50	-	-	52	-	-	-	-	-	-	-	-	-	-	-	-	-	-	-	-	-	-	-	-	-	63	
1998–99 Season
Velenje	Velenje	Berchtesgaden	Villach	Oberstdorf	Oberstdorf	Zakopane	Zakopane	Rælingen	Kuopio	Lahti	Lahti	Sankt Moritz	Engelberg	Bad Goisern	Bad Goisern	Sapporo	Sapporo	Sapporo	Lauscha	Lauscha	Gallio	Gallio	Reit im Winkl	Saalfelden	Ruhpolding	Braunlage	Braunlage	Westby	Westby	Planica	Planica	Titisee-Neustadt	Iron Mountain	Schönwald	Ishpeming	Ishpeming	Ishpeming	Sapporo	Zaō	Zaō	Courchevel	Courchevel	Vikersund	Vikersund	Hede	Hede	Kuopio	Rovaniemi	Ruka	Ruka	Points
-	-	-	-	-	-	39	43	-	-	-	-	-	-	-	-	-	-	-	-	-	-	-	-	-	-	-	-	-	-	-	-	-	-	-	-	-	-	-	-	-	-	-	-	-	-	-	-	-	-	-	0
1999–2000 Season
Velenje	Velenje	Villach	Villach	Oberstdorf	Zakopane	Zakopane	Rælingen	Hakuba	Hakuba	Trondheim	Trondheim	Kuopio	Lahti	Lahti	Innsbruck	Engelberg	Gallio	Gallio	Sapporo	Sapporo	Sapporo	Brotterode	Lauscha	Braunlage	Braunlage	Hakuba	Hakuba	Courchevel	Courchevel	Berchtesgaden	Saalfelden	Mislinja	Westby	Westby	Planica	Planica	Ishpeming	Ishpeming	Schönwald	Titisee-Neustadt	Eisenerz	Eisenerz	Zaō	Zaō	Våler	Våler	Harrachov	Harrachov	Rovaniemi	Ruka	Points
-	-	-	-	-	q	q	-	-	-	-	-	-	-	-	-	-	-	-	-	-	-	-	-	-	-	-	-	-	-	-	-	-	-	-	-	-	-	-	-	-	-	-	-	-	-	-	-	-	-	-	0
2001–02 Season
Velenje	Velenje	Villach	Villach	Oberstdorf	Rælingen	Rælingen	Calgary	Calgary	Park City	Park City	Oberhof	Ruka	Ruka	Lahti	Lahti	Sankt Moritz	Engelberg	Innsbruck	Sapporo	Sapporo	Sapporo	Bischofshofen	Bischofshofen	Ishpeming	Ishpeming	Courchevel	Courchevel	Lauscha	Westby	Westby	Braunlage	Braunlage	Gallio	Gallio	Planica	Iron Mountain	Iron Mountain	Schönwald	Schönwald	Zaō	Zaō	Vikersund	Vikersund	Vikersund	Points						
-	-	-	-	-	-	-	-	-	-	-	-	-	-	-	-	-	-	-	-	-	-	-	-	-	-	-	-	-	-	-	42	32	-	-	-	-	-	-	-	-	-	-	-	-	0						
2002–03 Season
Lahti	Lahti	Liberec	Liberec	Sankt Moritz	Engelberg	Seefeld	Bischofshofen	Sapporo	Sapporo	Sapporo	Planica	Planica	Titisee-Neustadt	Titisee-Neustadt	Braunlage	Braunlage	Willingen	Zakopane	Zakopane	Eisenerz	Eisenerz	Westby	Brotterode	Brotterode	Lauscha	Ishpeming	Ishpeming	Ishpeming	Ruhpolding	Ruhpolding	Zaō	Zaō	Stryn	Stryn	Points																
-	-	-	-	-	-	-	-	-	-	-	-	-	-	-	-	-	-	63	33	-	-	-	50	36	51	-	-	-	-	-	-	-	-	-	0																
Legend
1 2 3 4-10 11-30 Below 30 dq – Disqualified q – Disqualified in qualifications q – Did not qualify: – Did not compete

== Private life ==
Andrzej Galica is a graduate of the School of Sports Championship in Zakopane. His son, Andrzej, also competed in ski jumping events.

== Bibliography ==
- Więcek, Andrzej (2014). Mistrzostwa Polski w Narciarstwie klasycznym i alpejskim 1920–2013 [Polish Championships in Nordic and Alpine Skiing 1920–2013] (in Polish). Zamość: Atut. ISBN 9788389797544.
