= Aleksandr Belov (ski jumper) =

Russian ski jumper

Personal information
- Nationality: Russian
- Born: 11 September 1981 (age 43); Ufa, Russia

Sport
- Sport: Ski jumping

Aleksandr Belov (born 11 September 1981) is a Russian ski jumper. He competed in the normal hill and large hill events at the 2002 Winter Olympics.
