= Allan Carriou =

French ice hockey player

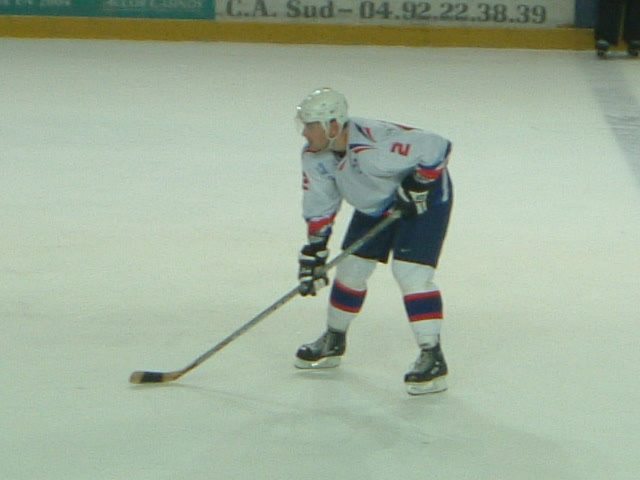
- Allan Carriou in 2003

Personal information
- Nationality: French
- Born: 2 February 1976 (age 50) Mont-Saint-Aignan, France

Sport
- Sport: Ice hockey

Achievements and titles
- Olympic finals: 2002 Winter Olympics

Allan Carriou (born 2 February 1976) is a French ice hockey player. He competed in the men's tournament at the 2002 Winter Olympics.
