= Andrey Lyskovets =

Belarusian ski jumper

Personal information
- Nationality: Belarusian
- Born: 7 October 1974 (age 50); Minsk, Belarus

Sport
- Sport: Ski jumping

Andrey Lyskovets (born 7 October 1974) is a Belarusian ski jumper. He competed in the normal hill and large hill events at the 2002 Winter Olympics.
