= Kazimierz Długopolski =

Polish Nordic combined skier

Personal information
- Nationality: Polish
- Born: 6 July 1950 (age 74); Zakopane, Poland

Sport
- Sport: Nordic combined

Kazimierz Długopolski (born 6 July 1950) is a Polish skier. He competed in the Nordic combined events at the 1972 Winter Olympics and the 1980 Winter Olympics.
