= Florentin Durand =

French ski jumper

Personal information
- Nationality: French
- Born: 9 November 1982 (age 42); Saint-Martin-d'Hères, France

Sport
- Sport: Ski jumping

Florentin Durand (born 9 November 1982) is a French ski jumper. He competed in the large hill event at the 2002 Winter Olympics.
