= Volodymyr Boshchuk =

Ukrainian ski jumper

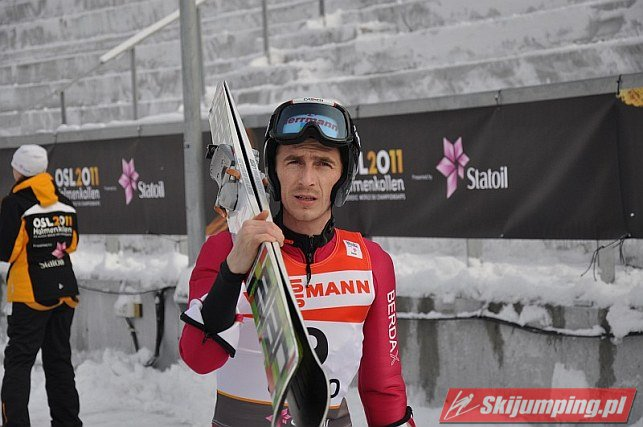

Personal information
- Born: 3 August 1982 (age 43) Verkhovyna, Ukrainian SSR

Sport
- Sport: Skiing
- Club: Verkhovina Ski School

World Cup career
- Seasons: 2006-present
- Indiv. wins: 0
- Updated on 9 February 2008

Volodymyr Boshchuk (Ukrainian: Володимир Бощук) (born 3 August 1982, in Verkhovyna) is a Ukrainian ski jumper who has competed since 2002. He finished 50th in the individual normal hill event at the 2010 Winter Olympics in Vancouver, British Columbia, Canada.

Boshchuk's best finish at the FIS Nordic World Ski Championships was 13th twice in the team large hill events (2003, 2007) while his best individual finish was 28th in the individual large hill event at Liberec in 2009.

His best World Cup finish was ninth in a team large hill event at Finland in 2008 while his best individual finish was 26th in an individual large hill event at Norway the following year.
