= Olav Magne Dønnem =

Norwegian ski jumper

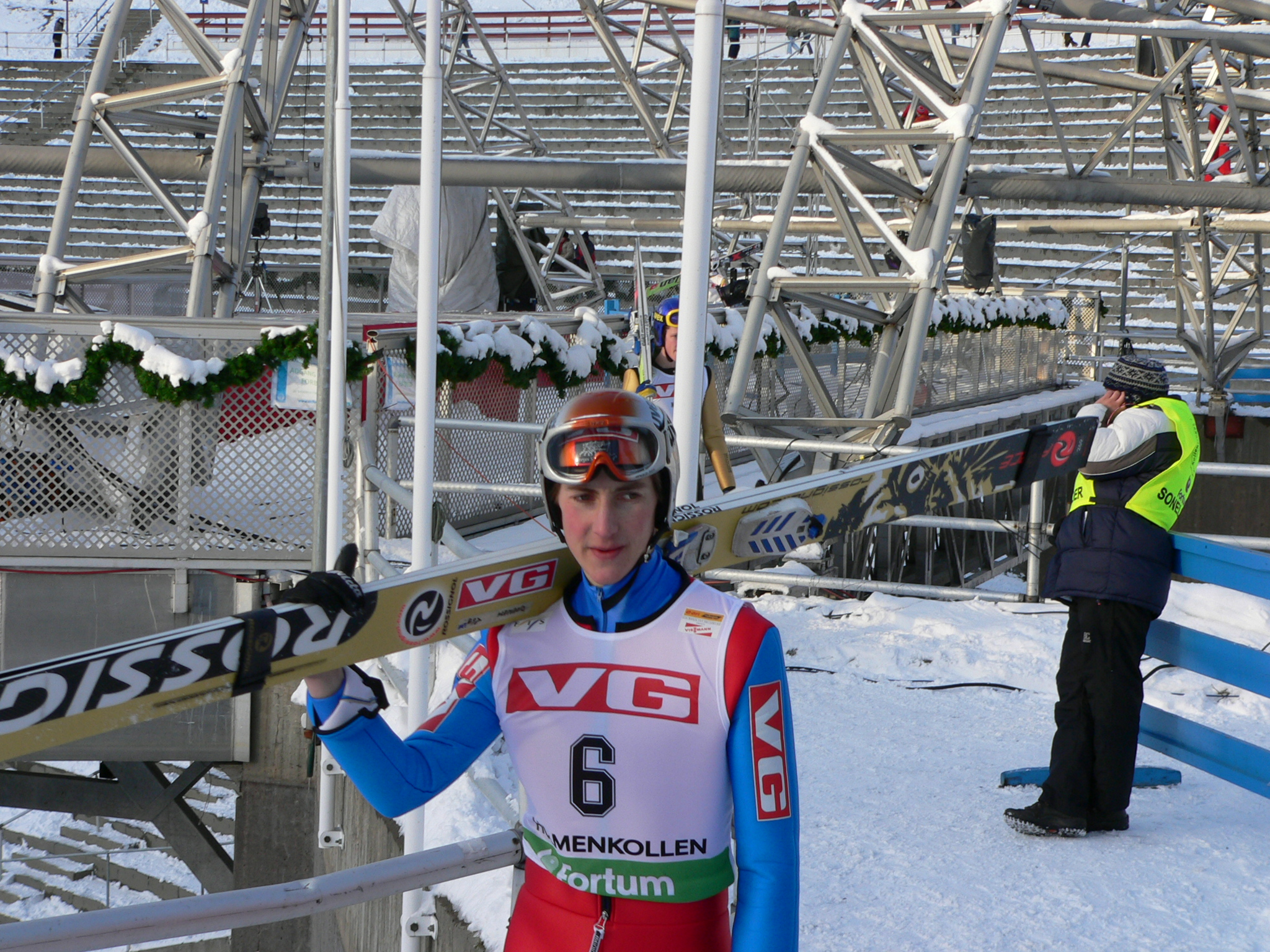

Personal information
- Full name: Olav Magne Dønnem
- Born: 21 November 1980 (age 45) Surnadal Municipality, Norway
- Height: 188 cm (6 ft 2 in)

Sport
- Sport: Skiing
- Club: Øvre Surnadal IL

World Cup career
- Seasons: 1998–2004
- Indiv. podiums: 0
- Indiv. wins: 0

Achievements and titles
- Personal bests: 214.5 m (704 ft); Vikersund, March 2004

Olav Magne Dønnem (born 21 November 1980) is a Norwegian former ski jumper.

In the World Cup he finished among the top 10 on three occasions. In 1998 he won the Norwegian National Junior Championship in Lysgårdsbakkene in Lillehammer Municipality, Norway. At the 2001 FIS Nordic World Ski Championships, he came 39th in the large hill. He finished 19th at the FIS Ski Flying World Championships 2000. He won the 2003–04 Continental Cup. His personal best is fourth place in 1998 in Harrachov.
