= Tomisław Tajner =

Polish ski jumper

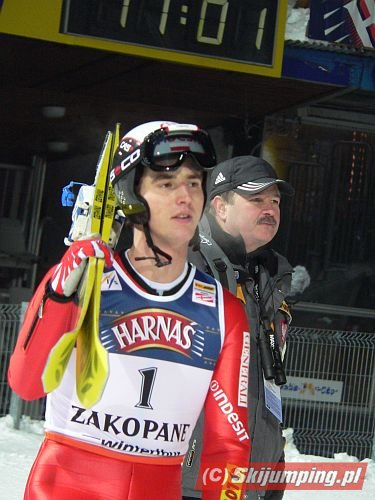
- Tajner in Zakopane, 2006

Personal information
- Nationality: Poland
- Born: 1 January 1983 (age 43) Cieszyn, Poland
- Height: 1.82 m (6 ft 0 in)

Sport
- Sport: Skiing
- Club: KS Wisła

World Cup career
- Seasons: 2001–2004
- Indiv. starts: 26

Achievements and titles
- Personal bests: 195 m (640 ft); Harrachov, Mar 2002
- Updated on 5 February 2016

Tomisław Tajner (born 1 January 1983) is a Polish former ski jumper who competed from 2001 to 2010. His best individual World Cup results were 24th in Titisee-Neustadt on 1 December 2001, and 24th in Engelberg on 22 December 2002. In team competitions his best result was seventh in Lahti on 2 March 2002.

At the 2002 Winter Olympics in Salt Lake City, Tajner finished sixth in the large hill team competition and 39th in the individual large hill competition. At the 2003 Ski Jumping World Championships in Val di Fiemme, he finished seventh in the large hill team competition and 36th in the individual large hill competition. At the 2002 Ski Flying World Championships in Harrachov, he finished 33rd in the individual event.

He is the son of Apoloniusz Tajner.
