= Kristoffer Jåfs =

Swedish ski jumper (born 1980)

Kristofer Jåfs
Personal information
- Full name: Kristofer Jåfs
- Nationality: Sweden
- Born: 30 July 1980 (age 45)

Sport
- Sport: Skiing

World Cup career
- Seasons: 1998–2003
- Updated on 16 May 2015

Kristofer Jåfs (born 30 July 1980) is a Swedish former ski jumper who competed from 1998 to 2003. He competed in the FIS Ski Jumping World Cup from 1998 to 2003, with a fourth place being his best career finish. He also competed in three World Championships.

He made his World Cup debut in November 1998 with a 48th place in Lillehammer, and participated in the Four Hills Tournament where he collected his first World Cup points with an eighteenth place in Oberstdorf. He continued finishing lowly until March 1999, when he racked up two fourteenth places in Lahti and Oslo, and two 25th places in Trondheim and Falun.

In the 1999–2000 season he did not collect a single World Cup point, despite several starts, but in the 2000–2001 season he competed more often and did better. He took a fourteenth place already in December in Kuopio, followed up with a seventeenth place in January in Park City and a fourth place in March in Trondheim. At the 1999 World Ski Championships he finished 46th in the normal hill and 29th in the large hill, and at the 2001 World Ski Championships he finished 18th in the normal hill, 25th in the large hill and tenth in the team competition.

He made his Continental Cup debut in November 2001 in Kuusamo, and his best results were two eighth places from Falun and Calgary in 2002. He also competed in the 2001–2002 World Cup, but with a 22nd place (Engelberg in December) as the best finish. In the 2002–2003 World Cup he finished between 20th and 30th place five times. At the 2003 World Ski Championships he finished 34th in the normal hill and 33rd in the large hill.
