= Dirk Else =

German ski jumper (born 1977)

Personal information
- Born: 27 August 1977 (age 48)

Sport
- Sport: Skiing
- Club: SV Oberwiesenthal

World Cup career
- Seasons: 2000-2002
- Indiv. podiums: 0
- Indiv. wins: 0

Dirk Else (born 27 August 1977 in Erlabrunn, GDR) is a retired German ski jumper.

In the World Cup he finished once among the top 15, a twelfth place from Zakopane in January 2002 being his best result. He won the overall Continental Cup in the 1999/00 season.
