= Krystian Długopolski =

Polish ski jumper

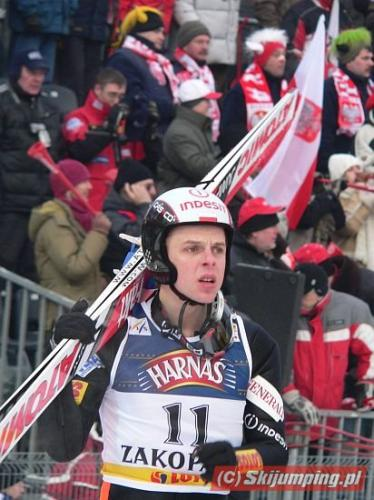
- Długopolski in Zakopane, 2005

Personal information
- Full name: Krystian Długopolski
- Nationality: Poland
- Born: 3 August 1980 (age 45) Zakopane, Poland
- Height: 1.73 m (5 ft 8 in)

Sport
- Sport: Skiing

World Cup career
- Seasons: 1997–1999; 2002–2006

Achievements and titles
- Personal bests: 191 m (627 ft); Vikersund, 7 Mar 2004
Medal record
Men's ski jumping
Universiade
Bronze medal – third place	2003 Tarvisio	Individual NH
Bronze medal – third place	2003 Tarvisio	Team
- Updated on 20 February 2014

Krystian Długopolski (born 3 August 1980) is a Polish former ski jumper who competed from 1997 to 2007, mainly at Continental Cup level. His best World Cup finish was tenth in Sapporo on 27 January 2002. In the Summer Grand Prix he finished sixth twice, in both an individual and team event in Hinterzarten on 6–7 August 2005. He also competed at the 1998 Winter Olympics.
