= Rémi Santiago =

French ski jumper

Personal information
- Nationality: French
- Born: 10 December 1980 (age 44); Chambéry, France

Sport
- Sport: Ski jumping

Rémi Santiago (born 10 December 1980) is a French ski jumper. He competed in the large hill event at the 2002 Winter Olympics.
