= Hiroki Yamada (ski jumper) =

Japanese ski jumper (born 1982)

Personal information
- Born: 19 May 1982 (age 44)

Sport
- Sport: Skiing
- Club: Kitano Construction

World Cup career
- Seasons: 2000-2006
- Indiv. podiums: 0
- Indiv. wins: 0

Hiroki Yamada (山田 大禧, Yamada Hiroki) (born 19 May 1982) is a Japanese ski jumper.

In the World Cup he finished four times among the top 10, his best results being two fourth places from Garmisch-Partenkirchen (1 January 2002) and Hakuba (24 January 2002).

He participated in the 2002 Winter Olympics held in Salt Lake City, finishing 33rd in the normal hill and 5th in the team event.
