= Tomasz Pochwała =

Polish Nordic combined skier

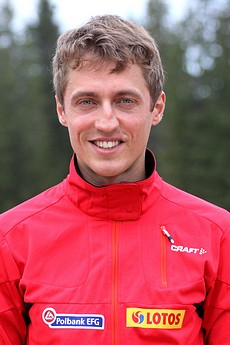
- Pochwała in 2011

Personal information
- Full name: Tomasz Pochwała
- Nationality: Poland
- Born: 7 May 1983 (age 43) Zakopane, Poland

Sport
- Sport: Skiing

World Cup career
- Seasons: 2001–2003; 2006

Achievements and titles
- Personal bests: 195 m (640 ft); Harrachov, 9 Mar 2002
Medal record
Men's Nordic combined
Universiade
Silver medal – second place	2011 Erzurum	Individual NH/10 km
Silver medal – second place	2011 Erzurum	Team Gundersen
- Updated on 22 February 2014

Tomasz Pochwała (born 7 May 1983) is a Polish ski jumper and Nordic combined competitor. He finished 6th in the team large hill and 40th in the individual normal hill events at the 2002 Winter Olympics in Salt Lake City.

At the 2003 Ski Jumping World Championships in Val di Fiemme, Pochwała finished 39th in the individual normal hill event. He finished 31st in the individual event of the 2002 Ski Flying World Championships in Harrachov.

Pochwała's best individual World Cup result was 15th in a large hill event in Zakopane in 2002. His only ski jumping victory also occurred in Poland in 2004 though it was an FIS Cup event on the individual large hill. Pochwała had an accident in Planica in 2002, when he lost control in the air and crashed heavily onto the slope.

In 2008 Pochwała changed his discipline from ski jumping to Nordic combined and currently competes in the Nordic Combined World Cup. In the 2009–10 season he achieved several points, something which had never been achieved by any Polish Nordic combined skier for 18 years.

He is the cousin of slalom canoeist Marcin Pochwała.
