= Damjan Fras =

Slovenian ski jumper (born 1973)

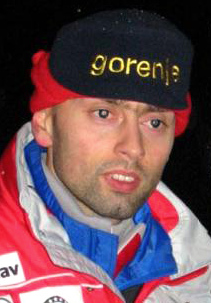
- Fras in 2003

Personal information
- Born: 21 February 1973 (age 53) Ljubljana, Yugoslavia

Sport
- Sport: Ski jumping

World Cup career
- Seasons: 1990–1992; 1994; 1998–2004
- Indiv. starts: 112
- Team starts: 11
Medal record
Men's ski jumping
Olympic Games
Bronze medal – third place	2002 Salt Lake City	Team large hill

Damjan Fras (born 21 February 1973) is a Slovenian former ski jumper who competed from 1990 to 2006. His career best achievement was winning a bronze medal at the 2002 Winter Olympics in Salt Lake City in the team large hill event. Fras also won bronze in the individual normal hill event at the 1991 World Junior Championships and finished third three times in the individual normal hill events in Velenje at Continental Cup level.
