= Planica 1991 =

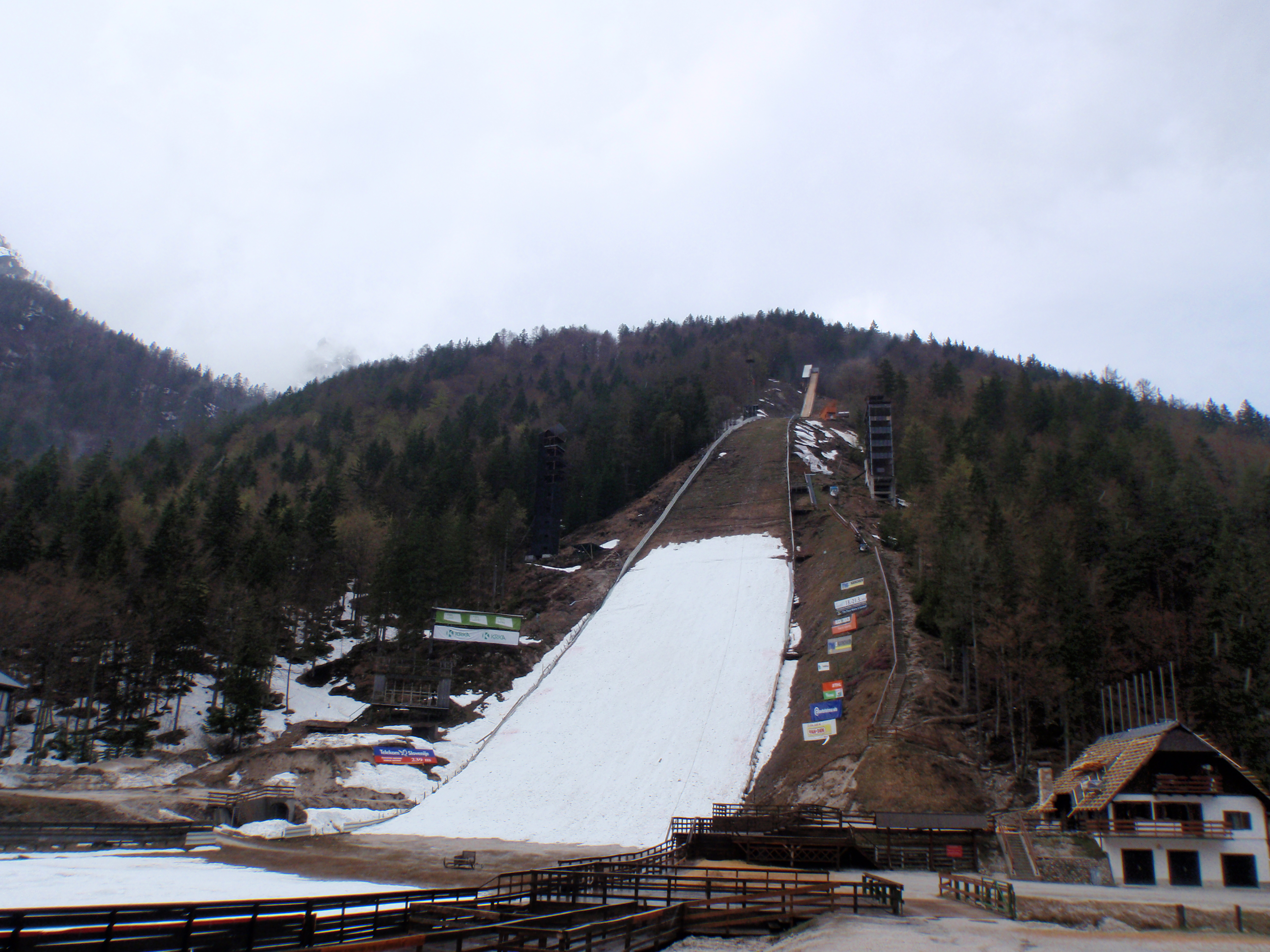
- Host city: Planica, SR Slovenia, Yugoslavia; 46°28′35″N 13°43′16″E
- Sport: Ski flying
- Events: World Cup (2×)
- Main venue: Velikanka bratov Gorišek K185

Planica 1991 was a two-day ski flying competition part of 1990/91 World Cup season, held from 23 to 24 March 1991 in Planica, SR Slovenia, Yugoslavia. Total of 80,000 people have gathered in three days.

== Schedule ==
| Date | Event | Rounds | Longest jump of the day | Visitors |
|---|---|---|---|---|
| 21 March 1991 | Hill test | 3 | 184 metres (604 ft) by Hannes Frank | N/A |
| 22 March 1991 | Official training | — | canceled; heavy rain and strong wind | 15,000 |
| 23 March 1991 | Competition 1 | 5 | 196 metres (643 ft) by André Kiesewetter (touch); 191 metres (627 ft) by Stephan Zünd; 191 metres (627 ft) by André Kiesewetter | 40,000 |
| 24 March 1991 | Competition 2 | 3 | 190 metres (623 ft) by Ralph Gebstedt | 25,000 |

== All jumps over 190 metres ==
Chronological order:

- 196 metres (643 ft) – 23 March – André Kiesewetter (WR touch; 2RD, canceled and repeated after)
- 191 metres (627 ft) – 23 March – Stephan Zünd (3RD)
- 191 metres (627 ft) – 23 March – André Kiesewetter (3RD)
- 190 metres (623 ft) – 24 March – Ralph Gebstedt (3RD)

== World Cup ==
There were two individual ski flying events on Velikanka bratov Gorišek K185. By ski flying rules of that time there were three round of jumps, but only two best counted in a final result. Total prize money of 12,000 CHF and 5,000 CHF for the winner.

On 21 March 1991, at an official hill test opening, Austrian Heinz Frank made the longest jump of the hill test at 184 metres (604 ft).

On 22 March 1991, official training was scheduled in front of 15,000 disappointed people, but canceled after only 7 Yugoslavian trial jumpers, as strong wind mixed with rain and high temperatures, overturned one of the TV cameras. Igor Strgar was the longest on a wet inrun track at 150 metres. Training was rescheduled on the next day (23 March) with one round, just before the first competition.

On 23 March 1991, a total of five rounds were taken in one day, this happened the first and the only time so far in ski flying history. Official training round from previous day took turn first, then competition came. In second round, André Kiesewetter touched the ground at world record distance at 196 metres, after that jury canceled it and repeated the 2nd round from the lower inrun gate. Later in the 3rd round Stephan Zünd landed at 191 metres and Kiesewetter tied that distance after him.

On 24 March 1991, after fantastic jump of 19 year old German Ralph Gebstedt at 190 metres in the third round, he was already proclaimed as a winner by event host and excited crowd. Round was almost canceled and repeated by the jury after Gebstedt's jump, but it didn't, and it counted as final result. After that jump Gebstedt said: "I had no problems at landing at all".

=== First competition ===
WC #273 — Official results — 40,000 people — 23 March 1991

| Rank | Name | 2 of 3 best rounds | | | Points |
|---|---|---|---|---|---|
| 1 | (Sweden) Staffan Tällberg | 168.0 m | 183.0 m | 180.0 m | 355.5 |
| 2 | (Switzerland) Stephan Zünd | 177.0 m | 119.0 m | 191.0 m | 354.0 |
| 3 | (Germany) André Kiesewetter | 158.0 m | 179.0 m | 191.0 m | 353.0 |
| 4 | (Austria) Werner Haim | 174.0 m | 180.0 m | 175.0 m | 349.5 |
| 5 | (Austria) Andreas Felder | 184.0 m | 167.0 m | 165.0 m | 345.0 |
| 6 | (Norway) Øyvind Berg | 173.0 m | 166.0 m | 180.0 m | 342.5 |
| 7 | (Austria) Heinz Kuttin | 172.0 m | 176.0 m | 163.0 m | 340.5 |
| 8 | (Germany) Dieter Thoma | 143.0 m | 170.0 m | 179.0 m | 335.5 |
| 9 | (Austria) Andreas Goldberger | 170.0 m | 172.0 m | 135.0 m | 333.5 |
| | (Germany) Jens Weissflog | 176.0 m | 169.0 m | 168.0 m | 333.5 |
| 11 | (Sweden) Mikael Martinsson | 153.0 m | 176.0 m | 169.0 m | 333.0 |
| 12 | (Germany) Ralph Gebstedt | 161.0 m | 172.0 m | 172.0 m | 331.5 |
| 13 | (Germany) Christof Duffner | 134.0 m | 176.0 m | 173.0 m | 327.0 |
| 14 | (Austria) Stefan Horngacher | 168.0 m | 162.0 m | 171.0 m | 324.5 |
| 15 | (Finland) Raimo Ylipulli | 131.0 m | 171.0 m | 158.0 m | 319.5 |
| 16 | (Switzerland) Christoph Lehmann | 160.0 m | 171.0 m | 158.0 m | 318.0 |
| 17 | (Norway) Espen Bredesen | 173.0 m | 153.0 m | 148.0 m | 312.0 |
| 18 | (Czechoslovakia) Pavel Ploc | 156.0 m | 169.0 m | 157.0 m | 311.5 |
| 19 | (Finland) Anssi Nieminen | 161.0 m | 163.0 m | 159.0 m | 310.5 |
| 20 | (Sweden) Magnus Westman | 161.0 m | 163.0 m | 159.0 m | 309.5 |
| 21 | (Sweden) Per-Inge Tällberg | N/A | N/A | N/A | 303.5 |
| 22 | (Sweden) Jan Boklöv | N/A | N/A | N/A | 301.5 |
| 23 | (Czechoslovakia) František Jež | N/A | N/A | N/A | 300.5 |
| 24 | (Austria) Klaus Huber | N/A | N/A | N/A | 297.5 |
| 25 | (Socialist Federal Republic of Yugoslavia) Franci Petek | 112.0 m | 158.0 m | 158.0 m | 297.0 |
| 26 | (France) Didier Mollard | N/A | N/A | N/A | 296.5 |
| 27 | (Socialist Federal Republic of Yugoslavia) Miran Tepeš | 150.0 m | 159.0 m | 147.0 m | 293.0 |
| 28 | (Norway) Ole Gunnar Fidjestøl | N/A | N/A | N/A | 292.5 |
| 29 | (Germany) Heiko Hunger | N/A | 161.0 m | 148.0 m | 286.5 |
| 29 | (Japan) Kazuhiro Higashi | N/A | 151.0 m | 156.0 m | 286.5 |
| 31 | (Czechoslovakia) Ladislav Dluhoš | N/A | N/A | N/A | 285.5 |
| 32 | (United States) Kris Severson | N/A | N/A | N/A | 285.0 |
| 33 | (Socialist Federal Republic of Yugoslavia) Primož Ulaga | 123.0 m | 147.0 m | 167.0 m | 283.5 |
| 34 | (Socialist Federal Republic of Yugoslavia) Goran Janus | 154.0 m | 148.0 m | 139.0 m | 282.0 |
| 35 | (Canada) Kirk Allen | N/A | N/A | N/A | 280.5 |
| 36 | (Italy) Ivo Pertile | N/A | N/A | N/A | 276.5 |
| 37 | (Poland) Jan Kowal | N/A | N/A | N/A | 270.5 |
| 38 | (Japan) Takuya Takeuchi | N/A | 147.0 m | 150.0 m | 270.0 |
| 39 | (Norway) Sturle Holseter | N/A | N/A | N/A | 268.5 |
| 40 | (France) Yannick Revuz | N/A | N/A | N/A | 267.0 |
| 41 | (Bulgaria) Zacharij Sotirov | N/A | N/A | N/A | 265.5 |
| 42 | (Socialist Federal Republic of Yugoslavia) Matjaž Zupan | 145.0 m | 139.0 m | 146.0 m | 264.0 |
| 43 | (Czechoslovakia) David Jiroutek | N/A | N/A | N/A | 262.5 |
| 44 | (United States) Jim Holland | N/A | N/A | N/A | 260.5 |
| 45 | (Czechoslovakia) Jaroslav Sakala | N/A | N/A | N/A | 260.0 |
| 46 | (Socialist Federal Republic of Yugoslavia) Damjan Fras | 146.0 m | 92.0 m | 139.0 m | 254.5 |
| 47 | (Switzerland) Benz Hauswirth | N/A | N/A | N/A | 248.5 |
| 48 | (Socialist Federal Republic of Yugoslavia) Andraž Kopač | 139.0 m | 139.0 m | 88.0 m | 248.0 |
| | (Socialist Federal Republic of Yugoslavia) Rajko Lotrič | 124.0 m | 139.0 m | 141.0 m | 248.0 |
| 50 | (Socialist Federal Republic of Yugoslavia) Matjaž Debelak | 136.0 m | 139.0 m | 139.0 m | 247.0 |
| 51 | (Socialist Federal Republic of Yugoslavia) Samo Gostiša | 138.0 m | 139.0 m | 139.0 m | 245.0 |
| 52 | (Socialist Federal Republic of Yugoslavia) Janez Štirn | 135.0 m | 133.0 m | 137.0 m | 243.0 |
| 53 | (Socialist Federal Republic of Yugoslavia) Primož Kopač | 137.0 m | 135.0 m | 133.0 m | 241.5 |
| 54 | (Switzerland) Thomas Kindlimann | N/A | N/A | N/A | 238.0 |
| 55 | (Czechoslovakia) Tomáš Goder | N/A | N/A | N/A | 237.5 |
| 56 | (Canada) John Lockyer | N/A | N/A | N/A | 234.0 |
| 57 | (Bulgaria) Emil Zografski | N/A | N/A | N/A | 224.5 |
| 58 | (United States) Bryan Sanders | N/A | N/A | N/A | 223.0 |
| 59 | (Socialist Federal Republic of Yugoslavia) Tomaž Knafelj | 123.0 m | 131.0 m | 121.0 m | 215.5 |
| 60 | (Socialist Federal Republic of Yugoslavia) Matej Oblak | 129.0 m | 127.0 m | 120.0 m | 206.0 |
| 61 | (Socialist Federal Republic of Yugoslavia) Sašo Komovec | 116.0 m | 111.0 m | 101.0 m | 183.0 |
| 62 | (Poland) Alojzy Moskal | N/A | N/A | N/A | 178.0 |

Didn't count in final result. The worst of three jumps.

=== Second competition ===
WC #274 — Official results — 25,000 people — 24 March 1991

| Rank | Name | 2 of 3 best rounds | | | Points |
|---|---|---|---|---|---|
| 1 | (Germany) Ralph Gebstedt | 170.0 m | 168.0 m | 190.0 m | 355.0 |
| 2 | (Austria) Stefan Horngacher | 173.0 m | 165.0 m | 189.0 m | 354.5 |
| 3 | (Germany) Dieter Thoma | 135.0 m | 176.0 m | 182.0 m | 354.0 |
| 4 | (Switzerland) Stephan Zünd | 183.0 m | 165.0 m | 176.0 m | 344.0 |
| 5 | (Sweden) Staffan Tällberg | 168.0 m | 146.0 m | 178.0 m | 338.5 |
| 6 | (Sweden) Mikael Martinsson | 157.0 m | 162.0 m | 181.0 m | 337.5 |
| 7 | (Austria) Andreas Goldberger | 177.0 m | 166.0 m | 172.0 m | 335.5 |
| | (Austria) Werner Haim | 180.0 m | 151.0 m | 165.0 m | 335.5 |
| 9 | (Socialist Federal Republic of Yugoslavia) Franci Petek | 163.0 m | 170.0 m | 168.0 m | 332.5 |
| 10 | (Czechoslovakia) Jaroslav Sakala | 165.0 m | 168.0 m | 168.0 m | 330.5 |
| 11 | (Germany) André Kiesewetter | 172.0 m | 163.0 m | 176.0 m | 329.5 |
| 12 | (Finland) Anssi Nieminen | N/A | 162.0 m | 169.0 m | 327.0 |
| 13 | (Germany) Christof Duffner | 184.0 m | 140.0 m | 162.0 m | 326.5 |
| 14 | (Sweden) Jan Boklöv | 121.0 m | 167.0 m | 173.0 m | 323.0 |
| | (Germany) Jens Weissflog | 161.0 m | 161.0 m | 171.0 m | 323.0 |
| | (Austria) Heinz Kuttin | 116.0 m | 164.0 m | 167.0 m | 323.0 |
| 17 | (France) Steve Delaup | 156.0 m | 169.0 m | 153.0 m | 322.5 |
| 18 | (Austria) Andreas Felder | 165.0 m | 148.0 m | 166.0 m | 318.5 |
| 19 | (Germany) Heiko Hunger | 161.0 m | 162.0 m | 161.0 m | 316.0 |
| 20 | (Czechoslovakia) František Jež | 164.0 m | 151.0 m | 165.0 m | 315.5 |
| 21 | (Italy) Ivo Pertile | N/A | N/A | N/A | 314.0 |
| 22 | (Sweden) Magnus Westman | N/A | N/A | N/A | 312.5 |
| 23 | (Czechoslovakia) Pavel Ploc | N/A | N/A | N/A | 311.5 |
| 24 | (Austria) Franz Neuländtner | N/A | N/A | N/A | 309.5 |
| 25 | (Norway) Ole Gunnar Fidjestøl | N/A | N/A | N/A | 304.0 |
| 25 | (France) Didier Mollard | N/A | N/A | N/A | 304.0 |
| 27 | (Switzerland) Christoph Lehmann | N/A | N/A | N/A | 300.5 |
| 28 | (Norway) Øyvind Berg | N/A | N/A | N/A | 299.0 |
| 29 | (Socialist Federal Republic of Yugoslavia) Goran Janus | 149.0 m | 141.0 m | 165.0 m | 296.0 |
| 30 | (Canada) Kirk Allen | N/A | N/A | N/A | 294.5 |
| 31 | (Czechoslovakia) Ladislav Dluhoš | N/A | N/A | N/A | 293.5 |
| 32 | (Norway) Espen Bredesen | N/A | N/A | N/A | 293.0 |
| 33 | (Sweden) Per-Inge Tällberg | N/A | N/A | N/A | 289.5 |
| 34 | (Finland) Raimo Ylipulli | N/A | N/A | N/A | 287.0 |
| 35 | (Japan) Kazuhiro Higashi | N/A | 152.0 m | 147.0 m | 286.5 |
| 36 | (Poland) Jan Kowal | N/A | N/A | N/A | 286.0 |
| 37 | (Bulgaria) Zacharij Sotirov | N/A | N/A | N/A | 280.5 |
| 38 | (Socialist Federal Republic of Yugoslavia) Miran Tepeš | 150.0 m | 133.0 m | 148.0 m | 276.5 |
| 39 | (United States) Kris Severson | N/A | N/A | N/A | 275.5 |
| 40 | (Czechoslovakia) Tomáš Goder | N/A | N/A | N/A | 273.5 |
| 41 | (Socialist Federal Republic of Yugoslavia) Rajko Lotrič | 127.0 m | 133.0 m | 149.0 m | 261.0 |
| 42 | (Switzerland) Benz Hauswirth | N/A | N/A | N/A | 258.0 |
| 43 | (Socialist Federal Republic of Yugoslavia) Matjaž Zupan | 139.0 m | 128.0 m | 144.0 m | 256.0 |
| 44 | (Japan) Takuya Takeuchi | N/A | 141.0 m | 143.0 m | 254.0 |
| 45 | (Switzerland) Martin Trunz | N/A | N/A | N/A | 252.0 |
| 46 | (United States) Jim Holland | N/A | N/A | N/A | 251.0 |
| 47 | (Socialist Federal Republic of Yugoslavia) Damjan Fras | 112.0 m | 132.0 m | 141.0 m | 248.0 |
| 48 | (Socialist Federal Republic of Yugoslavia) Janez Debelak | 133.0 m | 127.0 m | 143.0 m | 246.5 |
| 49 | (Socialist Federal Republic of Yugoslavia) Janez Štirn | 134.0 m | 110.0 m | 137.0 m | 243.5 |
| 50 | (Socialist Federal Republic of Yugoslavia) Primož Kopač | 121.0 m | 129.0 m | 140.0 m | 242.5 |
| 51 | (Poland) Bogan Papierz | N/A | N/A | N/A | 234.0 |
| 52 | (Socialist Federal Republic of Yugoslavia) Matej Oblak | 123.0 m | 127.0 m | 134.0 m | 232.0 |
| 53 | (Socialist Federal Republic of Yugoslavia) Franci Rogelj | 113.0 m | 123.0 m | 137.0 m | 230.5 |
| 54 | (Czechoslovakia) David Jiroutek | N/A | N/A | N/A | 228.0 |
| 55 | (Socialist Federal Republic of Yugoslavia) Tomaž Knafelj | 123.0 m | 123.0 m | 135.0 m | 227.0 |
| | (Socialist Federal Republic of Yugoslavia) Samo Gostiša | 123.0 m | 128.0 m | 131.0 m | 227.0 |
| 57 | (Norway) Sturle Holseter | N/A | N/A | N/A | 223.5 |
| 58 | (Bulgaria) Emil Zografski | N/A | N/A | N/A | 222.5 |
| 59 | (Canada) John Lockyer | N/A | N/A | N/A | 219.0 |
| 60 | (United States) Bryan Sanders | N/A | N/A | N/A | 212.5 |
| 61 | (Socialist Federal Republic of Yugoslavia) Sašo Komovec | 116.0 m | 118.0 m | 113.0 m | 194.5 |

== Invalid ski flying world record ==
The all-time longest ski jump in parallel style ever.

| Date | Name | Country | Metres | Feet |
|---|---|---|---|---|
| 23 March 1991 | André Kiesewetter | Germany | 196 | 643 |

Not recognized! Touch ground at world record distance.
