= 1990–91 FIS Ski Flying World Cup =

FIS Ski Flying World Cup 1990/91
Winners
- Overall: (Switzerland) Stephan Zünd
- Nations Cup (unofficial): Austria

Competitions
- Venues: 2
- Individual: 4

The 1990/91 FIS Ski Flying World Cup was the 1st official World Cup season in ski flying awarded with small crystal globe as the subdiscipline of FIS Ski Jumping World Cup.

There was not enough ski flying events in previous seasons (maybe one, two or even none) and consequently there were no separate ski flying standings (with no small crystal globes awarded). And so those events counted only in overall ranking. As in the 1980s ski flying venues were still exchanging, by each venue came into their turn average only on every 3 years.

2 different venues (Planica and Bad Mitterndorf) hosted 4 individual events in total in two different countries. Swiss Stephan Zünd became the first to win small crystal globe in ski flying.

== Map of World Cup hosts ==
| (Austria) Bad Mitterndorf | (Socialist Federal Republic of Yugoslavia) Planica |
|---|---|
| Kulm | Velikanka bratov Gorišek |
Europe

== Invalid world record ==
Invalid world record distance achieved within this World Cup season.

| Date | Athlete | Hill | Round | Place | Metres | Feet |
|---|---|---|---|---|---|---|
| 23 March 1991 | (Germany) André Kiesewetter | Velikanka bratov Gorišek HS240 | R2 | Planica, Yugoslavia | 196 | 643 |

Longest jump in history at that time (all-time longest in parallel style), but invalid due to Kiesewetter (touch) upon landing.

== Calendar ==
=== Men's Individual ===
| All | No. | Date | Place (Hill) | Size | Winner | Second | Third | Ski flying leader | R. |
|---|---|---|---|---|---|---|---|---|---|
| 265 | 1 | 23 February 1991 | (Austria) Bad Mitterndorf (Kulm K185) | F _{018} | (Switzerland) Stephan Zünd | (Finland) Ari-Pekka Nikkola | (Sweden) Per-Inge Tällberg | (Switzerland) Stephan Zünd | |
| 266 | 2 | 24 February 1991 | (Austria) Bad Mitterndorf (Kulm K185) | F _{019} | (Austria) Stefan Horngacher | (Germany) Ralph Gebstedt | (Austria) Heinz Kuttin | (Switzerland) Stephan Zünd | |
| 273 | 3 | 23 March 1991 | (Socialist Federal Republic of Yugoslavia) Planica (Velikanka bratov Gorišek K185) | F _{020} | (Sweden) Staffan Tällberg | (Switzerland) Stephan Zünd | (Germany) André Kiesewetter | (Switzerland) Stephan Zünd | |
| 274 | 4 | 24 March 1991 | (Socialist Federal Republic of Yugoslavia) Planica (Velikanka bratov Gorišek K185) | F _{021} | (Germany) Ralph Gebstedt | (Austria) Stefan Horngacher | (Germany) Dieter Thoma | (Switzerland) Stephan Zünd | |
| 1st FIS Ski Flying Men's Overall (23 February – 24 March 1991) | | | | | (Switzerland) Stephan Zünd | (Austria) Stefan Horngacher | (Germany) Ralph Gebstedt | Ski Flying Overall | |

== Standings ==
Points were still distributed by original old scoring system.

=== Ski Flying ===
| Rank | after 4 events | 23/02/1991 Kulm | 24/02/1991 Kulm | 23/03/1991 Planica | 24/03/1991 Planica | Total |
|---|---|---|---|---|---|---|
| | (Switzerland) Stephan Zünd | 25 | 7 | 20 | 12 | 64 |
| 2 | (Austria) Stefan Horngacher | 6 | 25 | 2 | 20 | 53 |
| 3 | (Germany) Ralph Gebstedt | 3 | 20 | 4 | 25 | 52 |
| 4 | (Sweden) Staffan Tällberg | 7 | 4 | 25 | 11 | 47 |
| 5 | (Austria) Werner Haim | 8 | 12 | 12 | 9 | 41 |
| 6 | (Austria) Heinz Kuttin | 11 | 15 | 9 | 2 | 37 |
| 7 | (Sweden) Mikael Martinsson | 9 | 5 | 5 | 10 | 29 |
| 8 | (Finland) Ari-Pekka Nikkola | 20 | 7 | — | — | 27 |
| 9 | (Germany) Dieter Thoma | — | — | 8 | 15 | 23 |
| 10 | (Austria) Andreas Felder | 10 | — | 11 | | 21 |
| 11 | (Socialist Federal Republic of Yugoslavia) Franci Petek | 12 | 1 | — | 7 | 20 |
| | (Germany) André Kiesewetter | — | — | 15 | 5 | 20 |
| 13 | (Sweden) Per-Inge Tällberg | 15 | 3 | — | — | 18 |
| 14 | (Austria) Andreas Goldberger | — | — | 7 | 9 | 16 |
| 15 | (Austria) Klaus Huber | 5 | 9 | — | — | 14 |
| 16 | (Finland) Raimo Ylipulli | — | 11 | 1 | — | 12 |
| 17 | (Czechoslovakia) Ladislav Dluhoš | — | 10 | — | — | 10 |
| | (Norway) Øyvind Berg | — | — | 10 | — | 10 |
| 19 | (Germany) Jens Weißflog | — | — | 7 | 2 | 9 |
| 20 | (Socialist Federal Republic of Yugoslavia) Goran Janus | — | 8 | — | — | 8 |
| 21 | (Germany) Christof Duffner | — | — | 3 | 3 | 6 |
| | (Czechoslovakia) Jaroslav Sakala | — | — | — | 6 | 6 |
| 23 | (Norway) Espen Bredesen | 4 | — | — | — | 4 |
| | (Finland) Anssi Nieminen | — | — | — | 4 | 4 |
| 25 | (Austria) Werner Schuster | 2 | — | — | — | 2 |
| | (Czechoslovakia) František Jež | — | 2 | — | — | 2 |
| | (Sweden) Jan Boklöv | — | — | — | 2 | 2 |
| 28 | (Austria) Franz Neuländtner | 1 | — | — | — | 1 |

=== Nations Cup (unofficial) ===
| Rank | after 4 events | Points |
|---|---|---|
| 1 | Austria | 185 |
| 2 | Germany | 110 |
| 3 | Sweden | 96 |
| 4 | Switzerland | 64 |
| 5 | Finland | 43 |
| 6 | Yugoslavia | 28 |
| 7 | Czechoslovakia | 18 |
| 8 | Norway | 14 |
