= 1990–91 FIS Ski Jumping World Cup =

12th season of the FIS Ski Jumping World Cup

1990–91 World Cup
Winners
- Overall: (Austria) Andreas Felder
- Ski Flying: (Switzerland) Stephan Zünd
- Four Hills Tournament: (Germany) Jens Weißflog
- Nations Cup: Austria

Competitions
- Venues: 16
- Individual: 22
- Cancelled: 4

The 1990–91 FIS Ski Jumping World Cup was the 12th World Cup season in ski jumping and the 1st official World Cup season in ski flying with first ever small crystal globe awarded.

Season began in Lake Placid, United States on 1 December 1990 and finished in Štrbské Pleso, Czechoslovakia on 21 March 1991. The individual World Cup winner was Andreas Felder and Nations Cup was taken by Team of Austria. Total 4 events were cancelled; Oberwiesenthal was rescheduled 3-times (two times to Oberhof) and finally cancelled due to bad weather. Olympic test for both events in Courchevel was cancelled as new hills were not yet completed. And last of the season in Štrbské Pleso was cancelled due to severe crashes and poorly prepared inrun.

22 men's individual events on 16 different venues in 10 countries were held on three different continents (Europe, Asia and North America). Two competition were cancelled this season.

On 23 March 1991, André Kiesewetter made longest ever parallel style jump at 196 m (643 ft) in Planica, unfortunately with hand touch and didn't count as world record.

Peaks of the season were FIS Ski Flying World Championships and Four Hills Tournament.

== Invalid world record ==
Invalid world record distance achieved within this World Cup season.

Date	Athlete	Hill	Round	Place	Metres	Feet
23 March 1991	(Germany) André Kiesewetter	Velikanka bratov Gorišek HS240	R2	Planica, Yugoslavia	196	643

Longest jump in history at that time (all-time longest in parallel style), but invalid due to Kiesewetter (touch) upon landing.

== Map of world cup hosts ==
Europe
Germany	Austria Asia	North America

== Calendar ==
=== Men's Individual ===
N – normal hill / L – large hill / F – flying hill
All	No.	Date	Place (Hill)	Size	Winner	Second	Third	Overall leader	R.
254	1	1 December 1990	(United States) Lake Placid (MacKenzie Int. K86, K114)	N _{093}	(Austria) Andreas Felder	(Finland) Ari-Pekka Nikkola	(Finland) Anssi Nieminen	(Austria) Andreas Felder	
255	2	2 December 1990	(United States) Lake Placid (MacKenzie Int. K86, K114)	L _{145}	(Germany) André Kiesewetter	(Switzerland) Stephan Zünd	(Austria) Ernst Vettori	(Germany) André Kiesewetter	
256	3	8 December 1990	(Canada) Thunder Bay (Big Thunder K90, K120)	N _{094}	(Austria) Andreas Felder	(Germany) Dieter Thoma	(Socialist Federal Republic of Yugoslavia) Franci Petek	(Austria) Andreas Felder	
257	4	9 December 1990	(Canada) Thunder Bay (Big Thunder K90, K120)	L _{146}	(Austria) Andreas Felder	(Socialist Federal Republic of Yugoslavia) Franci Petek	(Finland) Ari-Pekka Nikkola	(Austria) Andreas Felder	
258	5	15 December 1990	(Japan) Sapporo (Miyanomori K90) (Ōkurayama K115)	N _{095}	(Germany) André Kiesewetter	(Germany) Dieter Thoma	(Germany) Josef Heumann	(Austria) Andreas Felder	
259	6	16 December 1990	(Japan) Sapporo (Miyanomori K90) (Ōkurayama K115)	L _{147}	(Germany) Dieter Thoma	(Germany) André Kiesewetter	(Finland) Vesa Hakala	(Germany) André Kiesewetter	
260	7	30 December 1990	(Germany) Oberstdorf (Schattenbergschanze K115)	L _{148}	(Germany) Jens Weißflog	(Austria) Andreas Felder	(Austria) Heinz Kuttin	(Austria) Andreas Felder	
261	8	1 January 1991	(Germany) Garmisch-Pa (Große Olympiaschanze K107)	L _{149}	(Germany) Jens Weißflog (Austria) Andreas Felder		(Austria) Stefan Horngacher	(Austria) Andreas Felder	
262	9	4 January 1991	(Austria) Innsbruck (Bergiselschanze K109)	L _{150}	(Finland) Ari-Pekka Nikkola	(Germany) Jens Weißflog	(Germany) Dieter Thoma	(Austria) Andreas Felder	
263	10	6 January 1991	(Austria) Bischofshofen (Paul-Ausserleitner K111)	L _{151}	(Austria) Andreas Felder	(Austria) Ernst Vettori	(Finland) Ari-Pekka Nikkola	(Austria) Andreas Felder	
39th Four Hills Tournament Overall (30 December 1990 – 6 January 1991)					(Germany) Jens Weißflog	(Austria) Andreas Felder	(Germany) Dieter Thoma	4H Tournament	
		9 January 1991	(Germany) Oberwiesenthal (Fichtelbergschanzen K90)	N _{cnx}	cancelled due to strong wind; rescheduled to 10 January			—	
		(Note: Cancelled event from Oberwiesenthal (9 January) was unsuccessfully rescheduled to 10 January.)10 January 1991	(Germany) Oberwiesenthal (Fichtelbergschanzen K90)	N _{cnx}	cancelled again and rescheduled to Oberhof on 11 January			—	
		(Note: Originally cancelled event from Oberwiesenthal (9 January) unsuccessfully rescheduled to 10 January; again 2nd time unsuccessfully rescheduled in Oberhof (11 January).)11 January 1991	(Germany) Oberhof (Hans-Renner K90, K130)	N _{cnx}	rescheduled Oberwiesenthal competition cancelled 2nd time due to rain (for the third and final time rescheduled to 13 January)			—	
264	11	12 January 1991	(Germany) Oberhof (Hans-Renner K90, K130)	L _{152}	(Germany) Dieter Thoma	(Austria) Andreas Felder	(Germany) Jens Weißflog	(Austria) Andreas Felder	
		(Note: Originally cancelled event from Oberwiesenthal (9 January) unsuccessfully rescheduled to 10 January; and 2nd time unsuccessfully rescheduled in Oberhof (11 January); then finally the 3rd time cancelled on 13 January.)13 January 1991	(Germany) Oberhof (Hans-Renner K90, K130)	N _{cnx}	Oberwiesenthal competition cancelled 3rd final time due to strong wind			—	
		17 January 1991	(France) Courchevel (Tremplin du Praz K90, K120)	N _{cnx}	cancelled due to construction delays at Olympic ski jump hills			—	
		20 January 1991	(France) Courchevel (Tremplin du Praz K90, K120)	L _{cnx}	cancelled due to construction delays at Olympic ski jump hills			—	
FIS Nordic World Ski Championships 1991 (10 – 16 February • (Italy) Predazzo)
265	12	23 February 1991	(Austria) Bad Mitterndorf (Kulm K185)	F _{018}	(Switzerland) Stephan Zünd	(Finland) Ari-Pekka Nikkola	(Sweden) Per-Inge Tällberg	(Austria) Andreas Felder	
266	13	24 February 1991	(Austria) Bad Mitterndorf (Kulm K185)	F _{019}	(Austria) Stefan Horngacher	(Germany) Ralph Gebstedt	(Austria) Heinz Kuttin	(Austria) Andreas Felder	
267	14	2 March 1991	(Finland) Lahti (Salpausselkä K90, K114)	N _{096}	(Austria) Andreas Felder	(Austria) Heinz Kuttin	(Austria) Werner Haim	(Austria) Andreas Felder	
268	15	3 March 1991	(Finland) Lahti (Salpausselkä K90, K114)	L _{153}	(Austria) Andreas Felder	(Austria) Stefan Horngacher	(Germany) Dieter Thoma	(Austria) Andreas Felder	
269	16	6 March 1991	(Sweden) Bollnäs (Bolleberget K90)	N _{097}	(Switzerland) Stephan Zünd	(Finland) Risto Laakkonen	(Czechoslovakia) František Jež	(Austria) Andreas Felder	
270	17	10 March 1991	(Sweden) Falun (Lugnet K112)	L _{154}	(Sweden) Mikael Martinsson	(Germany) Dieter Thoma	(Austria) Ernst Vettori	(Austria) Andreas Felder	
271	18	13 March 1991	(Norway) Trondheim (Granåsen K120)	L _{155}	(Austria) Heinz Kuttin	(Sweden) Mikael Martinsson	(Norway) Øyvind Berg	(Austria) Andreas Felder	
272	19	17 March 1991	(Norway) Oslo (Holmenkollbakken K105)	L _{156}	(Austria) Ernst Vettori	(Austria) Stefan Horngacher	(Sweden) Staffan Tällberg	(Austria) Andreas Felder	
273	20	23 March 1991	(Socialist Federal Republic of Yugoslavia) Planica (Velikanka bratov Gorišek K185)	F _{020}	(Sweden) Staffan Tällberg	(Switzerland) Stephan Zünd	(Germany) André Kiesewetter	(Austria) Andreas Felder	
274	21	24 March 1991	(Socialist Federal Republic of Yugoslavia) Planica (Velikanka bratov Gorišek K185)	F _{021}	(Germany) Ralph Gebstedt	(Austria) Stefan Horngacher	(Germany) Dieter Thoma	(Austria) Andreas Felder	
275	22	30 March 1991	(Czechoslovakia) Štrbské Pleso (MS 1970 A K120, K90)	L _{157}	(Switzerland) Stephan Zünd	(Sweden) Mikael Martinsson	(Finland) Raimo Ylipulli	(Austria) Andreas Felder	
		31 March 1991	(Czechoslovakia) Štrbské Pleso (MS 1970 A K120, K90)	N _{cnx}	cancelled after boycott after two heavy crashes and other complications (due to bad weather and poorly prepared melted inrun)			—	
12th FIS World Cup Overall (1 December 1990 – 30 March 1991)					(Austria) Andreas Felder	(Switzerland) Stephan Zünd	(Germany) Dieter Thoma	World Cup Overall	

== Standings ==
=== Overall ===
Rank	after 22 events	Points
1	(Austria) Andreas Felder	260
2	(Switzerland) Stephan Zünd	206
3	(Germany) Dieter Thoma	201
4	(Austria) Stefan Horngacher	179
5	(Finland) Ari-Pekka Nikkola	158
	(Sweden) Mikael Martinsson	158
7	(Austria) Heinz Kuttin	148
8	(Germany) Jens Weißflog	141
9	(Austria) Ernst Vettori	139
10	(Germany) André Kiesewetter	134

=== Ski Flying ===
Rank	after 4 events	Points
1	(Switzerland) Stephan Zünd	64
2	(Austria) Stefan Horngacher	53
3	(Germany) Ralph Gebstedt	52
4	(Sweden) Staffan Tällberg	47
5	(Austria) Werner Haim	41
6	(Austria) Heinz Kuttin	37
7	(Sweden) Mikael Martinsson	29
8	(Finland) Ari-Pekka Nikkola	27
9	(Germany) Dieter Thoma	23
10	(Austria) Andreas Felder	21

=== Nations Cup ===
Rank	after 22 events	Points
1	Austria	886
2	Germany	672
3	Finland	347
4	Sweden	281
5	Switzerland	237
6	Czechoslovakia	168
7	Yugoslavia	162
8	Norway	140
9	Soviet Union	57
10	Japan	34

=== Four Hills Tournament ===
Rank	after 4 events	Points
1	(Germany) Jens Weißflog	819.7
2	(Austria) Andreas Felder	805.6
3	(Germany) Dieter Thoma	779.6
4	(Austria) Ernst Vettori	774.8
5	(Austria) Stefan Horngacher	773.1
6	(Finland) Ari-Pekka Nikkola	772.7
7	(Sweden) Mikael Martinsson	751.9
8	(Switzerland) Sylvain Freiholz	729.5
9	(Finland) Vesa Hakala	696.8
10	(Finland) Risto Laakkonen	676.7

== See also ==
- 1990–91 FIS Europa Cup (2nd level competition)
