= Goran Janus =

Ski jumper

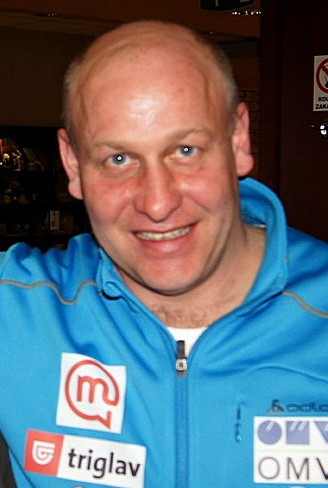

Personal information
- Nationality: (Socialist Federal Republic of Yugoslavia) Yugoslavia (1989-91); Slovenia (1992)
- Born: 27 March 1970 (age 56) Belgrade, SR Serbia, Yugoslavia

Sport
- Sport: Skiing

World Cup career
- Seasons: 1990–1992
- Indiv. starts: 32

Achievements and titles
- Personal bests: 205.5 m (674 ft); Planica, 23 Mar 1997
- Updated on 7 January 2016

Goran Janus (born 27 March 1970) is a Yugoslavian and later Slovenian former ski jumper. Since 2011 he was the head coach of the Slovenian national ski jumping team. He was replaced in January 2019 by Gorazd Bertoncelj. He is of Serbian descent through his father.

== Career ==
=== Debut (1989) ===
He made a world cup debut on 16 December 1989 in Sapporo with 24th place. He performed on the 38th edition of Four Hills Tournament and ended on 74th place in final standings.

=== Nordic world championships (1991) ===
He performed on FIS Nordic World Ski Championships 1991 in Val di Fiemme, Italy. He took 22nd on large and 46th place on normal hill. It was his first and last Nordic world championships performance.

=== Ski flying world championships (1992) ===
He performed on FIS Ski Flying World Championships 1992 in Harrachov where he took 26th place. It was his first and last Ski flying world championships performance.

=== National record (1997) ===
Five years since last world cup start he made the last jump of his career where he unexpectedly set the Slovenian national record on 23 March 1997 in Planica. For those days he landed at time a sensational 205.5 m (674 ft) as a V-jumper. After this the highlight of his ski jumping career jump he became widely recognized in Slovenia. He hold the national record for three years when it was broken by Primož Peterka again in Planica.

== World Cup ==
=== Standings ===
Season	Overall	SF	4H
1989/90	—	N/A	74
1990/91	42	20	56
1991/92	—	—	—

=== Individual starts (32) ===
Season	1	2	3	4	5	6	7	8	9	10	11	12	13	14	15	16	17	18	19	20	21	22	23	24	25	Points
1989/90	Thunder Bay	Thunder Bay	Lake Placid	Lake Placid	Sapporo	Sapporo	Oberstdorf	Garmisch-Partenkirchen	Innsbruck	Bischofshofen	Harrachov	Liberec	Zakopane	St.Moritz	Gstaad	Engelberg	Predazzo	Predazzo	Lahti	Lahti	Örnsköldsvik	Solleftea	Raufoss	Planica	Planica	0
1989/90	–	–	–	–	24	21	64	63	79	70	–	–	–	–	–	–	–	–	–	–	–	–	–	58	72	0
1990/91	Lake Placid	Lake Placid	Thunder Bay	Thunder Bay	Sapporo	Sapporo	Oberstdorf	Garmisch-Partenkirchen	Innsbruck	Bischofshofen	Oberhof	Tauplitz	Tauplitz	Lahti	Lahti	Bollnaes	Falun	Trondheim	Oslo	Planica	Planica	Strbske Pleso				12
1990/91	–	–	–	–	15	15	34	–	–	38	–	16	8	14	35	47	27	29	40	34	29	34				12
1991/92	Thunder Bay	Thunder Bay	Sapporo	Sapporo	Oberstdorf	Garmisch-Partenkirchen	Innsbruck	Bischofshofen	Predazzo	St.Moritz	Engelberg	Oberstdorf	Oberstdorf	Lahti	Lahti	Örnsköldsvik	Trondheim	Trondheim	Oslo	Harrachov	Planica					0
1991/92	–	–	–	–	–	–	–	–	–	–	–	28	32	40	60	49	51	29	–	26	36					0
