= 1991–92 FIS Ski Jumping World Cup =

Ski jumping championship season

1991–92 World Cup
Winners
- Overall: (Finland) Toni Nieminen
- Ski Flying: (Austria) Werner Rathmayr
- Four Hills Tournament: (Finland) Toni Nieminen
- Swiss Tournament: (Austria) Andreas Felder
- Nations Cup: Austria

Competitions
- Venues: 16
- Individual: 21
- Team: 2
- Cancelled: 1
- Rescheduled: 1

The 1991–92 FIS Ski Jumping World Cup was the 13th World Cup season in ski jumping and the 2nd official World Cup season in ski flying with second small crystal globe awarded.

Season began in Thunder Bay, Canada on 1 December 1991 and finished in Planica, Slovenia on 29 March 1992. The individual World Cup winner was then sixteen year old Finnish "wunderkind" Toni Nieminen, one of the biggest surprises and one of the youngest stars in World Cup history, dominating the season with 8 World Cup wins, Four Hill Tournament title and Olympic gold on large hill and men's team event; Nations Cup was taken by Team of Austria.

21 men's individual events on 15 different venues in 11 countries were held on the three different continents (Europe, Asia and North America). And first ever team events (2 men's) were held in WC history. 1 event was cancelled (Harrachov) and 1 rescheduled (from Falun to Trondheim).

Peaks of the season were Winter Olympics, Four Hills Tournament and FIS Ski Flying World Championships (which on two separate days also counted for FIS World Cup).

On 22 March 1992 Harrachov at Ski Flying World Championships that also counted for World Cup Christof Duffner crashed at 194 metres (636 ft) equaling WR distance (not valid).

== Invalid world record ==
Invalid world record distance achieved within this World Cup season.

Date	Athlete	Hill	Round	Place	Metres	Feet
22 March 1992	(Germany) Christof Duffner	Čerťák K185	R1	Harrachov, Czechoslovakia	194	636

Tied official world record distance at that time, but invalid due to Duffner (crash) upon landing.

== Map of world cup hosts ==
Europe
Germany	Austria Asia	Canada

== Calendar ==
=== Men's Individual ===
N – normal hill / L – large hill / F – flying hill
All	No.	Date	Place (Hill)	Size	Winner	Second	Third	Overall leader	R.
276	1	1 December 1991	(Canada) Thunder Bay (Big Thunder K90, K120)	N _{098}	(Finland) Toni Nieminen	(Finland) Ari-Pekka Nikkola	(Austria) Stefan Horngacher	(Finland) Toni Nieminen	
277	2	2 December 1991	(Canada) Thunder Bay (Big Thunder K90, K120)	L _{158}	(Austria) Ernst Vettori	(United States) Jim Holland	(Switzerland) Stephan Zünd	(Finland) Toni Nieminen	
278	3	14 December 1991	(Japan) Sapporo (Miyanomori K90) (Ōkurayama K115)	N _{099}	(Austria) Werner Rathmayr	(Sweden) Staffan Tällberg	(Czechoslovakia) František Jež	(Finland) Toni Nieminen	
279	4	15 December 1991	(Japan) Sapporo (Miyanomori K90) (Ōkurayama K115)	L _{159}	(Austria) Werner Rathmayr	(Switzerland) Stephan Zünd	(Austria) Werner Haim	(Austria) Werner Rathmayr	
280	5	29 December 1991	(Germany) Oberstdorf (Schattenbergschanze K115)	L _{160}	(Finland) Toni Nieminen	(Austria) Werner Rathmayr	(Switzerland) Stephan Zünd	(Austria) Werner Rathmayr	
281	6	1 January 1992	(Germany) Garmisch-Pa (Große Olympiaschanze K107)	L _{161}	(Austria) Andreas Felder	(Finland) Toni Nieminen	(Switzerland) Stephan Zünd	(Finland) Toni Nieminen	
282	7	4 January 1992	(Austria) Innsbruck (Bergiselschanze K109)	L _{162}	(Finland) Toni Nieminen	(Austria) Andreas Goldberger	(Austria) Andreas Felder	(Finland) Toni Nieminen	
283	8	6 January 1992	(Austria) Bischofshofen (Paul-Ausserleitner K120)	L _{163}	(Finland) Toni Nieminen	(Austria) Martin Höllwarth	(Slovenia) Franci Petek	(Finland) Toni Nieminen	
40th Four Hills Tournament Overall (29 December 1991 – 6 January 1992)					(Finland) Toni Nieminen	(Austria) Martin Höllwarth	(Austria) Werner Rathmayr	4H Tournament	
284	9	10 January 1992	(Italy) Predazzo (Trampolino dal Ben K90)	N _{100}	(Austria) Martin Höllwarth	(Sweden) Mikael Martinsson	(Sweden) Staffan Tällberg	(Finland) Toni Nieminen	
285	10	17 January 1992	(Switzerland) St. Moritz (Olympiaschanze K95)	N _{101}	(Austria) Andreas Felder	(Austria) Werner Rathmayr	(Austria) Martin Höllwarth	(Finland) Toni Nieminen	
286	11	19 January 1992	(Switzerland) Engelberg (Gross-Titlis-Schanze K120)	L _{164}	(Austria) Andreas Felder	(Switzerland) Stephan Zünd	(Austria) Werner Rathmayr	(Finland) Toni Nieminen	
25th Swiss Tournament Overall (17 – 19 January 1992)					(Austria) Andreas Felder	(Austria) Werner Rathmayr	(Switzerland) Stephan Zünd	Swiss Tournament	
287	12	25 January 1992	(Germany) Oberstdorf (Heini-Klopfer K182)	F _{022}	(Austria) Werner Rathmayr	(Austria) Andreas Felder	(Sweden) Mikael Martinsson	(Austria) Werner Rathmayr	
288	13	26 January 1992	(Germany) Oberstdorf (Heini-Klopfer K182)	F _{023}	(Austria) Werner Rathmayr	(Austria) Andreas Felder	(Austria) Andreas Goldberger	(Austria) Werner Rathmayr	
1992 Winter Olympics (9 – 16 February • (France) Albertville)
289	14	29 February 1992	(Finland) Lahti (Salpausselkä K90, K114)	N _{102}	(Finland) Toni Nieminen	(Austria) Ernst Vettori	(Japan) Noriaki Kasai	(Austria) Werner Rathmayr	
290	15	1 March 1992	(Finland) Lahti (Salpausselkä K90, K114)	L _{165}	(Finland) Toni Nieminen	(Austria) Heinz Kuttin	(Austria) Andreas Felder	(Austria) Werner Rathmayr	
291	16	4 March 1992	(Sweden) Örnsköldsvik (Paradiskullen K90)	N _{103}	(Austria) Ernst Vettori	(Japan) Noriaki Kasai	(Sweden) Mikael Martinsson	(Austria) Werner Rathmayr	
		8 March 1992	(Sweden) Falun (Lugnet K115)	L _{cnx}	rescheduled to Trondheim on the same day (as all other program was moved from Falun to Trondheim)			—	
292	17	(Note: Cancelled event from Falun (8 March) was rescheduled to Trondheim on same day.)8 March 1992	(Norway) Trondheim (Granåsen K120)	L _{166}	(Austria) Heinz Kuttin	(Austria) Ernst Vettori	(Finland) Toni Nieminen	(Finland) Toni Nieminen	
293	18	11 March 1992	(Norway) Trondheim (Granåsen K120)	L _{167}	(Finland) Toni Nieminen	(Austria) Ernst Vettori	(Finland) Ari-Pekka Nikkola	(Finland) Toni Nieminen	
294	19	15 March 1992	(Norway) Oslo (Holmenkollbakken K110)	L _{168}	(Finland) Toni Nieminen	(Czechoslovakia) Jiří Parma	(Austria) Martin Höllwarth	(Finland) Toni Nieminen	
FIS World Cup 1991/92 = FIS Ski Flying World Championships 1992 (21 March • Harrachov)
295	20	21 March 1992	(Czechoslovakia) Harrachov (Čerťák K180)	F _{024}	(Japan) Noriaki Kasai	(Austria) Andreas Goldberger	(Italy) Roberto Cecon	(Finland) Toni Nieminen	
		22 March 1992	(Czechoslovakia) Harrachov (Čerťák K180)	F _{cnx}	cancelled just before the end of first round due to strong wind (after Christof Duffner crashed at 194 metres WR distance)			—	
296	21	29 March 1992	(Slovenia) Planica (Bloudkova velikanka K120)	L _{169}	(Austria) Andreas Felder	(Austria) Heinz Kuttin	(Finland) Toni Nieminen	(Finland) Toni Nieminen	
13th FIS World Cup Overall (1 December 1991 – 29 March 1992)					(Finland) Toni Nieminen	(Austria) Werner Rathmayr	(Austria) Andreas Felder	World Cup Overall	

=== Men's Team ===
All	No.	Date	Place (Hill)	Size	Winner	Second	Third	R.
1	1	12 January 1992	(Italy) Predazzo (Trampolino dal Ben K120)	L _{001}	Austria Werner Rathmayr; Ernst Vettori; Martin Höllwarth; Andreas Felder	Finland Vesa Hakala; Ari-Pekka Nikkola; Raimo Ylipulli; Toni Nieminen	Switzerland Yvan Vouillamoz; Martin Trunz; Sylvain Freiholz; Stephan Zünd	
2	2	28 March 1992	(Slovenia) Planica (Bloudkova velikanka K120)	L _{002}	Austria Andreas Felder; Martin Höllwarth; Werner Rathmayr; Heinz Kuttin	Germany Andreas Scherer; Christof Duffner; Jens Weißflog; Ralph Gebstedt	Finland Ari-Pekka Nikkola; Raimo Ylipulli; Risto Laakkonen; Toni Nieminen	

== Standings ==
=== Overall ===
Rank	after 21 events	Points
1	(Finland) Toni Nieminen	269
2	(Austria) Werner Rathmayr	229
3	(Austria) Andreas Felder	218
4	(Austria) Ernst Vettori	205
5	(Switzerland) Stephan Zünd	147
6	(Sweden) Mikael Martinsson	132
7	(Czechoslovakia) František Jež	127
8	(Austria) Andreas Goldberger	123
9	(Japan) Noriaki Kasai	115
10	(Austria) Martin Höllwarth	112

=== Ski Flying ===
Rank	after 4 events	Points
1	(Austria) Werner Rathmayr	50
2	(Austria) Andreas Goldberger	46
3	(Austria) Andreas Felder	40
4	(Czechoslovakia) Tomáš Goder	36
5	(Sweden) Mikael Martinsson	34
6	(Slovenia) Samo Gostiša	27
7	(Japan) Noriaki Kasai	25
8	(Switzerland) Stephan Zünd	19
8	(Germany) Christof Duffner	19
10	(Switzerland) Martin Trunz	18

=== Nations Cup ===
Rank	after 23 events	Points
1	Austria	1193
2	Finland	491
3	Czechoslovakia	356
4	Switzerland	269
5	Sweden	237
6	Germany	186
7	Japan	169
	Slovenia	169
9	Norway	121
10	Italy	110

=== Four Hills Tournament ===
Rank	after 4 events	Points
1	(Finland) Toni Nieminen	902.4
2	(Austria) Martin Höllwarth	833.2
3	(Austria) Werner Rathmayr	832.9
4	(Slovenia) Franci Petek	817.7
5	(Czechoslovakia) František Jež	817.1
6	(Austria) Andreas Felder	814.1
7	(Switzerland) Stephan Zünd	806.9
8	(Finland) Ari-Pekka Nikkola	788.9
9	(Czechoslovakia) Jaroslav Sakala	787.9
10	(United States) Jim Holland	780.5

=== Swiss Tournament ===
Rank	after 2 events	Points
1	(Austria) Andreas Felder	445.2
2	(Austria) Werner Rathmayr	432.4
3	(Switzerland) Stephan Zünd	425.0
4	(Austria) Andreas Goldberger	413.4
5	(Austria) Ernst Vettori	406.9
6	(Slovenia) Samo Gostiša	403.0
7	(Sweden) Mikael Martinsson	397.3
8	(Austria) Martin Höllwarth	395.3
9	(Czechoslovakia) František Jež	395.1
10	(Sweden) Staffan Tällberg	394.9

== See also ==
- 1991–92 FIS Europa/Continental Cup (2nd level competition)
