= Gerd Siegmund =

German ski jumper

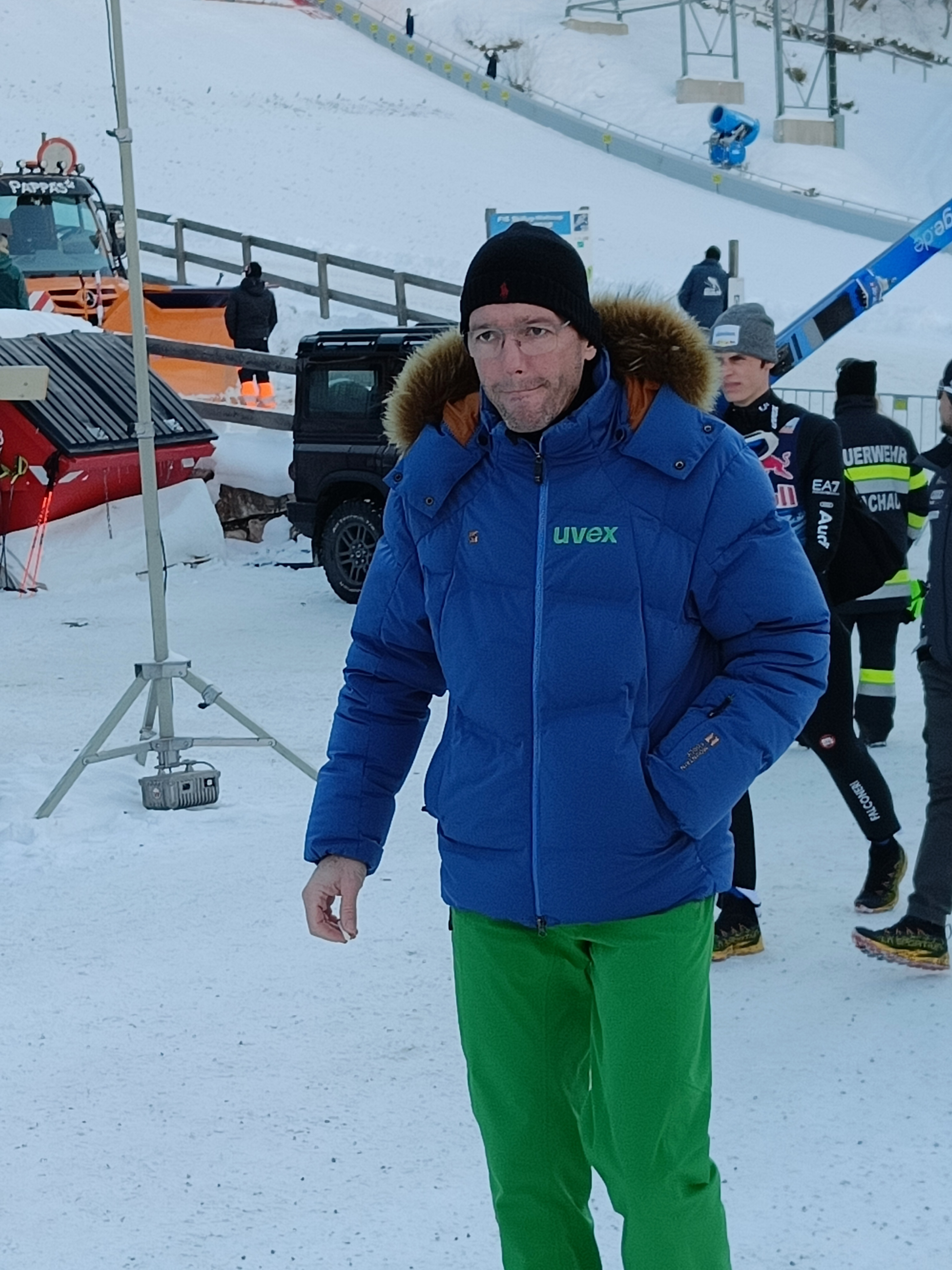

Personal information
- Nationality: East Germany (1989-90); Germany (1990-2000)
- Born: 7 February 1973 (age 53) Dresden, East Germany

Sport
- Sport: Skiing

World Cup career
- Seasons: 1990; 1992–2000
- Indiv. starts: 133
- Indiv. podiums: 1
- Indiv. wins: 1
- Team starts: 5
- Team podiums: 3
- Team wins: 1

Achievements and titles
- Personal bests: 190 m (623 ft); Oberstdorf, 25 February 1998
Medal record
Men's ski jumping
FIS Nordic World Ski Championships
Silver medal – second place	1995 Thunder Bay	Team LH
- Updated on 10 February 2016

Gerd Siegmund (born 7 February 1973) is an East German/German former ski jumper.

== Career ==
He won a silver medal in the team large hill at the 1995 FIS Nordic World Ski Championships in Thunder Bay, Ontario and finished 10th in the individual large hill at those same championships. Siegmund finished 11th in the individual normal hill at the 1994 Winter Olympics in Lillehammer. His best finish at the Ski-flying World Championships was 26th at Planica in 1994. Siegmund's only individual career victory was at Thunder Bay in 1994 in the individual normal hill.

== World Cup ==
=== Standings ===
Season	Overall	4H	SF	NT	JP
1989/90	—	—	N/A	N/A	N/A
1991/92	—	—	—	N/A	N/A
1992/93	59	28	—	N/A	N/A
1993/94	13	12	26	N/A	N/A
1994/95	22	22	15	N/A	N/A
1995/96	34	20	25	N/A	32
1996/97	88	—	—	51	82
1997/98	46	66	48	47	46
1998/99	41	26	—	21	40
1999/00	34	27	—	46	34

=== Wins ===
No.	Season	Date	Location	Hill	Size
1	1993/94	26 March 1994	(Canada) Thunder Bay	Big Thunder K90	NH
