= Ylipulli =

Ylipulli is a surname. Notable people with the surname include:

- Jukka Ylipulli (born 1963), Finnish Nordic combined skier
- Raimo Ylipulli (born 1970), Finnish ski jumper, brother of Jukka and Tuomo
- Tuomo Ylipulli (1965–2021), Finnish ski jumper
