= 1989–90 Four Hills Tournament =

1989–1990 edition of the Four Hills Tournament

The 1989-90 Four Hills Tournament took place at the four traditional venues of Oberstdorf, Garmisch-Partenkirchen, Innsbruck and Bischofshofen, located in Germany and Austria, between 28 December 1989 and 6 January 1990.

== Results ==
Date	Place	Hill	Size	Winner	Second	Third	Ref.
28 Dec 1989	(West Germany) Oberstdorf	Schattenbergschanze K-115	LH	(West Germany) Dieter Thoma	(West Germany) Josef Heumann	(East Germany) Jens Weißflog	
1 Jan 1990	(West Germany) Garmisch-Partenkirchen	Große Olympiaschanze K-107	LH	(East Germany) Jens Weißflog	(Finland) Risto Laakkonen	(Czechoslovakia) František Jež	
4 Jan 1990	(Austria) Innsbruck	Bergiselschanze K-109	LH	(Finland) Ari-Pekka Nikkola	(East Germany) Jens Weißflog	(Austria) Ernst Vettori	
6 Jan 1990	(Austria) Bischofshofen	Paul-Ausserleitner-Schanze K-111	LH	(Czechoslovakia) František Jež	(West Germany) Dieter Thoma	(Norway) Ole Gunnar Fidjestøl	

== Overall ==
Pos	Ski Jumper	Points
1	(West Germany) Dieter Thoma	870.5
2	(Czechoslovakia) František Jež	861.0
2	(East Germany) Jens Weißflog	855.0
4	(Austria) Ernst Vettori	851.5
5	(Finland) Ari-Pekka Nikkola	848.0
6	(Finland) Risto Laakkonen	844.0
7	(West Germany) Josef Heumann	835.5
8	(Norway) Rune Olijnyk	823.5
9	(Austria) Werner Haim	820.5
10	(Austria) Heinz Kuttin	811.0
