= KLH =

KLH may refer to:

- Keyhole limpet hemocyanin, a carrier protein
- Kolhapur Airport (IATA code KLH), a regional airport in Kolhapur, Maharashtra, India
- Korean Light Helicopter, a designation used by the Republic of Korea Army
- KLH (company), an audio company founded in 1957 in Cambridge, Massachusetts, United States
- KLH-Arena, a set of ski jump hills in Murau, Austria
- KLH Vajgar Jindřichův Hradec, an ice hockey team in Jindřichův Hradec, Czech Republic
- WKLH (also known simply as KLH), a radio station in Milwaukee, Wisconsin, United States

== See also ==
- KHL
