= Rune Olijnyk =

Norwegian former ski jumper (born 1968)

Medal record

Men's ski jumping

Representing Norway

World Championships
Silver medal – second place	1991 Val di Fiemme	Individual large hill

Rune Olijnyk (born December 27, 1968) is a Norwegian former ski jumper who competed in the early 1990s. He won a silver medal in the individual large hill at the 1991 FIS Nordic World Ski Championships in Val di Fiemme and finished fourth in the team large hill event (along with Espen Bredesen, Kent Johanssen and Jon Inge Kjørum) at those same championships.

At the 1992 Winter Olympics in Albertville, Olijnyk finished seventh in the team competition. He won two Norwegian championship team large hill medals with gold in 1992 and silver in 1991, and won three straight bronze medals in the individual normal hill (1990, 1991 and 1992).

He represented the club Høland IL.
