= Kent Johanssen =

Norwegian ski jumper

Personal information
- Born: 30 June 1970 (age 56)

Sport
- Sport: Skiing
- Club: Bækkelagets SK

World Cup career
- Seasons: 1989-1997
- Indiv. podiums: 2
- Indiv. wins: 0
Medal record
Men's ski jumping
World Championships
| Silver medal – second place | 1991 Val di Fiemme | Normal hill |
- Updated on 18 February 2010

Kent Johanssen (born 30 June 1970) is a retired Norwegian ski jumper. He won a silver medal in the individual normal hill at the 1991 World Championships.

He made his World Cup debut in March 1989 with a 3rd place in Oslo, and finished second in his second World Cup race in Planica later in March 1989. He won the gold medal at the 1989 FIS Junior World Ski Championships in Vang Municipality. The 1989–1990 World Cup started tougher, with nine placements outside the top 30, including all four races in the Four Hills Tournament. In February and March 1990 he racked up five placements between 20th and 29th, as well as one eighth place in Örnsköldsvik. In the 1990–1991 World Cup he only managed to finish seven times between 20th and 30th, but at the 1991 World Championships he finished 24th in the large hill, fourth in the team event and won the silver medal in the normal hill.

Between December 1991 and February 1995 he had only ten World Cup starts, with the best result being a 12th place from Oslo in February 1995. However, a video of him was aired across the world, as in the 1995 Norwegian Championships in Meldal Municipality he lost one of his two skis, but still managed to complete the jump and landing. In the 1995–1996 World Cup he competed more often, and recorded a fourth place, an eleventh and a fifteenth place. He also participated in the 1996 Ski-Flying World Championships. In his last World Cup season, the 1996–1997 World Cup, he had his best performance in the season opener with a seventh place in Lillehammer. In his twelve remaining World Cup races his best result was 12th.
