= Staffan Tällberg =

Swedish ski jumper

Personal information
- Nationality: Sweden
- Born: 17 April 1970 (age 56) Bollnäs, Sweden
- Height: 1.85 m (6 ft 1 in)

Sport
- Sport: Skiing

World Cup career
- Seasons: 1987–1996
- Indiv. starts: 106*
- Indiv. podiums: 7
- Indiv. wins: 1

Achievements and titles
- Personal bests: 183 m (600 ft); Planica, 23 March 1991
- Updated on 10 February 2016

Staffan Tällberg, born 17 April 1970 in Bollnäs, Sweden, is a Swedish former ski jumper.

== Career ==
His best Winter Olympics was at Calgary in 1988 where he finished seventh in the team large hill and eighth both in the individual normal hill and individual large hill events. He also ended up 2cond in Garmish-Partenkirchen on New Year's Day 1988.

At the FIS Nordic World Ski Championships, Tällberg earned his best finish of fifth in the team large hill event at Lahti in 1989 and his best individual finish of 11th in the individual normal hill event at Val di Fiemme in 1991.

Tällberg's best finish at the Ski-flying World Championships was 16th in 1992 at Harrachov. His lone World Cup competition victory was in a flying hill event in Planica in 1991.

He is the younger brother of Per-Inge Tällberg.

== World Cup ==
=== Standings ===
| Season | Overall | 4H | SF | JP |
|---|---|---|---|---|
| 1986/87 | — | — | N/A | N/A |
| 1987/88 | 12 | 6 | N/A | N/A |
| 1988/89 | 57 | — | N/A | N/A |
| 1989/90 | 28 | 39 | N/A | N/A |
| 1990/91 | 12 | — | 4 | N/A |
| 1991/92 | 16 | — | — | N/A |
| 1992/93 | — | 67 | — | N/A |
| 1993/94 | 49 | — | — | N/A |
| 1994/95 | — | — | — | N/A |
| 1995/96 | — | — | — | — |

=== Wins ===
| No. | Season | Date | Location | Hill | Size |
|---|---|---|---|---|---|
| 1 | 1990/91 | 23 March 1991 | (Socialist Federal Republic of Yugoslavia) Planica | Velikanka bratov Gorišek K185 | FH |
