= Mikael Martinsson (ski jumper) =

Swedish ski jumper

Personal information
- Full name: Hans Mikael Martinsson
- Nationality: Sweden
- Born: 25 November 1968 (age 57) Hakkas, Sweden
- Height: 1.76 m (5 ft 9 1/2 in)

Sport
- Sport: Skiing

World Cup career
- Seasons: 1988–1995
- Indiv. starts: 92
- Indiv. podiums: 6
- Indiv. wins: 1
- Team starts: 2

Achievements and titles
- Personal bests: 181 m (594 ft); Planica, 22-24 March 1991
- Updated on 10 February 2016

Hans Mikael Martinsson (born 25 November 1968) is a Swedish former ski jumper.

== World Cup ==
=== Standings ===
Season	Overall	4H	SF
1987/88	54	—	N/A
1988/89	50	60	N/A
1989/90	—	57	N/A
1990/91	5	7	7
1991/92	6	11	5
1992/93	26	17	—
1993/94	63	37	—
1994/95	63	—	—

=== Wins ===
No.	Season	Date	Location	Hill	Size
1	1990/91	10 March 1991	(Sweden) Falun	Lugnet K112	LH
