= Tomáš Goder =

Czech former ski jumper (born 1974)

Personal information
- Nationality: Czechoslovakia; Czech Republic
- Born: 4 September 1974 (age 51) Desná, Czechoslovakia

Sport
- Sport: Skiing

World Cup career
- Seasons: 1991–1994; 1997–1998
- Indiv. starts: 40
- Team starts: 2
Medal record
Men's ski jumping
Representing Czechoslovakia
Olympic Games
Bronze medal – third place	1992 Albertville	Team large hill
- Updated on 30 March 2016

Tomáš Goder (born 4 September 1974) is a Czech former ski jumper who competed from 1991 to 1998. His career best achievement was winning a bronze medal in the team large hill competition at the 1992 Winter Olympics in Albertville, while his best individual success was bronze in the individual normal hill competition at the 1991 World Junior Championships.
