= André Kiesewetter =

East German/German ski jumper

Personal information
- Nationality: East Germany (1989-90); Germany (1990-1994)
- Born: 20 August 1969 (age 56) Neuhaus am Rennweg, East Germany
- Height: 1.71 m (5 ft 7 1/2 in)

Sport
- Sport: Skiing

World Cup career
- Seasons: 1990–1991; 1993–1994
- Indiv. starts: 33
- Indiv. podiums: 4
- Indiv. wins: 2

Achievements and titles
- Personal bests: 191 m (627 ft); Planica, 23 March 1991
Medal record
Men's ski jumping
FIS Nordic World Ski Championships
Bronze medal – third place	1991 Val di Fiemme	Team LH
- Updated on 10 February 2016

André Kiesewetter (born 20 August 1969) is an East German/German former ski jumper.

== Career ==
He won the bronze medal in the team large hill and 7th in the individual large hillat at the 1991 FIS Nordic World Ski Championships and had his best and two World Cup wins in Lake Placid and Sapporo.

On 23 March 1991, he crashed as trial jumper at ski jumping world record distance at 196 metres (643 ft) back home on Velikanka bratov Gorišek K185 in Planica, Yugoslavia.

== World Cup ==
=== Standings ===
Season	Overall	4H	SF
1989/90	—	—	N/A
1990/91	11	25	6
1992/93	—	69	—
1993/94	—	76	—

=== Wins ===
No.	Season	Date	Location	Hill	Size
1	1990/91	2 December 1990	(Canada) Lake Placid	MacKenzie Intervale K114	LH
2	1990/91	15 December 1990	(Japan) Sapporo	Miyanomori K90	NH

== Invalid ski jumping world record ==
This is the longest parallel style ski jump in history.

Date	Hill	Location	Metres	Feet
23 March 1991	Velikanka bratov Gorišek K185	Planica, Yugoslavia	196	643

Not recognized! Ground touch at world record distance.
