= Franci Petek =

Slovenian ski jumper

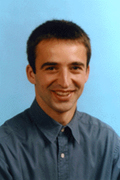

Personal information
- Nationality: (Socialist Federal Republic of Yugoslavia) Yugoslavia (1989-91); Slovenia (1991-95)
- Born: 15 June 1971 (age 55) Jesenice, SR Slovenia, Yugoslavia
- Height: 1.73 m (5 ft 8 in)

Sport
- Sport: Skiing

World Cup career
- Seasons: 1990–1995
- Indiv. starts: 90*
- Indiv. podiums: 5
- Indiv. wins: 1
- Team starts: 2

Achievements and titles
- Personal best: 178 m (584 ft)
Medal record
Men's ski jumping
FIS Nordic World Ski Championships
Gold medal – first place	1991 Val di Fiemme	Individual LH
- Updated on 10 February 2016

Franci Petek (born 15 June 1971) is a Slovenian former ski jumper and geographer who represented Yugoslavia during his ski jumping career.

== Career ==
At the 1991 FIS Nordic World Ski Championships in Val di Fiemme, Petek won a gold medal for Yugoslavia in the individual large hill. Petek's best finish at the Winter Olympics was 6th in the team large hill competition and 8th in the individual large hill at Albertville in 1992. He also finished 22nd in the 1990 Ski Flying World Championships and his only other victory was in an individual large hill competition at Engelberg, Switzerland in 1990.

He married Polona Kamenšek in 2000 and they have three children. Professionally he works as geographer and together with Petra Majdič he is the co-ambassador of Planica.

== World Cup ==
=== Standings ===
Season	Overall	4H	SF
1989/90	21	21	N/A
1990/91	11	17	11
1991/92	13	4	—
1992/93	21	13	—
1993/94	46	46	—
1994/95	20	15	—

=== Wins ===
No.	Season	Date	Location	Hill	Size
1	1989/90	11 February 1990	(Switzerland) Engelberg	Gross-Titlis-Schanze K120	LH

Olympic Games
Preceded by First	Flagbearer for Slovenia; Albertville 1992	Succeeded by Jure Košir
