= Stephan Zünd =

Swiss ski jumper (born 1969)

Personal information
- Nationality: Switzerland
- Born: 3 July 1969 (age 57) Zürich, Switzerland
- Height: 1.71 m (5 ft 7 1/2 in)

Sport
- Sport: Skiing

World Cup career
- Seasons: 1990–1996
- Indiv. starts: 87
- Indiv. podiums: 12
- Indiv. wins: 4
- Team starts: 4
- Team podiums: 1

Achievements and titles
- Personal bests: 191 m (577 ft); Planica, 23 March 1991
- Updated on 10 February 2016

Stephan Zünd (also spelled Stefan, born 3 July 1969) is a Swiss former ski jumper. He competed in the normal hill and large hill events at the 1992 Winter Olympics. Along with Jan Boklöv and Jiří Malec, he was an early pioneer of the V-style.

== Career ==
At the 1992 Winter Olympics in Albertville, he finished eighth in the team large hill and 20th in the individual normal hill events. Zünd's best finish at the FIS Nordic World Ski Championships was at Val di Fiemme in 1991 where he finished sixth in the team large hill and fifth in the individual large hill events. His best finish at the Ski-flying World Championships was sixth at Planica in 1994.

Zünd earned four individual World Cup career wins at various hills from 1991 to 1992.

Zünd realized early, that a low body weight can bring benefit in combination with a V-style. Therefore he stuck to a radical diet, suffered from anorexia at last and had a breakdown in December 1992. For a period of time Zünd consumed nothing but mineral water and had a weight of just 60 kg at a height of 1.81 m. After his retirement he spoke openly about his problems.

He named Walter Steiner as his idol.

== World Cup ==
=== Standings ===
Season	Overall	4H	SF	JP
1989/90	21	—	N/A	N/A
1990/91	2nd place, silver medalist(s)	13	1st place, gold medalist(s)	N/A
1991/92	5	7	8	N/A
1992/93	28	42	—	N/A
1993/94	35	—	—	N/A
1994/95	81	52	—	N/A
1995/96	—	—	—	4

=== Wins ===
No.	Season	Date	Location	Hill	Size
1	1990/91	23 February 1991	(Austria) Tauplitz/Bad Mitterndorf	Kulm K185	FH
2	1990/91	6 March 1991	(Sweden) Bollnäs	Bolleberget K90	NH
3	1990/91	30 March 1991	(Czechoslovakia) Štrbské Pleso	MS 1970 A K120	LH
4	1992/93	13 December 1992	(Germany) Ruhpolding	Große Zirmbergschanze K107	LH
