= Heiko Hunger =

German Nordic combined skier and ski jumper

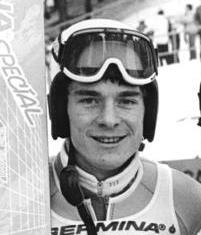
- Heiko Hunger (1989)

Medal record

Men's ski jumping

Representing Germany

World Championships
Bronze medal – third place	1991 Val di Fiemme	Team large hill

Heiko Hunger (born 24 June 1964) is a German former Nordic combined skier and ski jumper who competed from 1984 to 1992. He won the bronze medal in the team large hill at the 1991 FIS Nordic World Ski Championships and had his best individual finish of 30th in the individual normal hill at the 1989 championships

Hunger's best finishes at the Winter Olympics were 5th in the team large hill and 7th in the individual normal hill at Albertville in 1992. His best individual finish was 4th in the large hill in Canada in 1990. As a Nordic combined skier he placed 4th in the individual event at the 1985 championships in addition to this he placed 5th in the team event in the same championships. His lone individual victory came in a competition in Germany in 1985. He retired as athlete in 1992.
