= Bolleberget =

Ski jumping venue in Bollnäs, Sweden

Coordinates: 61.3734°N 16.3420°E

- Location: Bollnäs; Sweden
- Opened: 1964
- Renovated: 1995
- Closed: 2001

Size
- K–point: K-90, K-60, K-40, K-20

Bolleberget are ski jumping hills in Bollnäs, Sweden.

== History ==
It was opened in 1964 and owned by Bollnäs GoIF, and closed in 2001. It hosted one FIS Ski jumping World Cup event in 1991 on normal hill.

== World Cup ==
=== Men ===
Date	Size	Winner	Second	Third
6 Mar 1991	K-90	(Switzerland) Stephan Zünd	(Finland) Risto Laakkonen	(Czechoslovakia) František Jež
