= Ralph Gebstedt =

East German/German former ski jumper

Personal information
- Nationality: East Germany (1989-90); Germany (1990-1998)
- Born: 8 October 1971 (age 54) Friedrichroda, East Germany
- Height: 1.72 m (5 ft 7 1/2 in)

Sport
- Sport: Skiing

World Cup career
- Seasons: 1990–1998
- Indiv. starts: 108
- Indiv. podiums: 3
- Indiv. wins: 1
- Team starts: 3
- Team podiums: 1

Achievements and titles
- Personal bests: 190 m (623 ft); Planica, 24 March 1991
- Updated on 10 February 2016

Ralph Gebstedt (born 8 October 1971) is an East German/German former ski jumper.

== Career ==
On 24 March 1991 he won his only World Cup event in his career in Planica with personal best at 190 metres in the last round. After that jump Gebstedt said: "I had no problems at landing at all".

He participated in the Ski Flying World Championships in 1990, 1992 and 1996, his best finish being a fifteenth place from 1992. He won the Continental Cup in the 1993/94 season.

== World Cup ==
=== Standings ===
Season	Overall	4H	SF	NT	JP
1989/90	56	28	N/A	N/A	N/A
1990/91	14	70	3rd place, bronze medalist(s)	N/A	N/A
1991/92	32	17	11	N/A	N/A
1993/94	87	53	—	N/A	N/A
1994/95	34	23	27	N/A	N/A
1995/96	19	14	28	N/A	18
1996/97	44	27	32	37	43
1997/98	93	57	—	—	84

=== Wins ===
No.	Season	Date	Location	Hill	Size
1	1990/91	24 March 1991	(Socialist Federal Republic of Yugoslavia) Planica	Velikanka bratov Gorišek K185	FH
