= KLH-Arena =

Austrian ski hills

Coordinates: 47.1089°N 14.1587°E

Gumpold-Schanzen
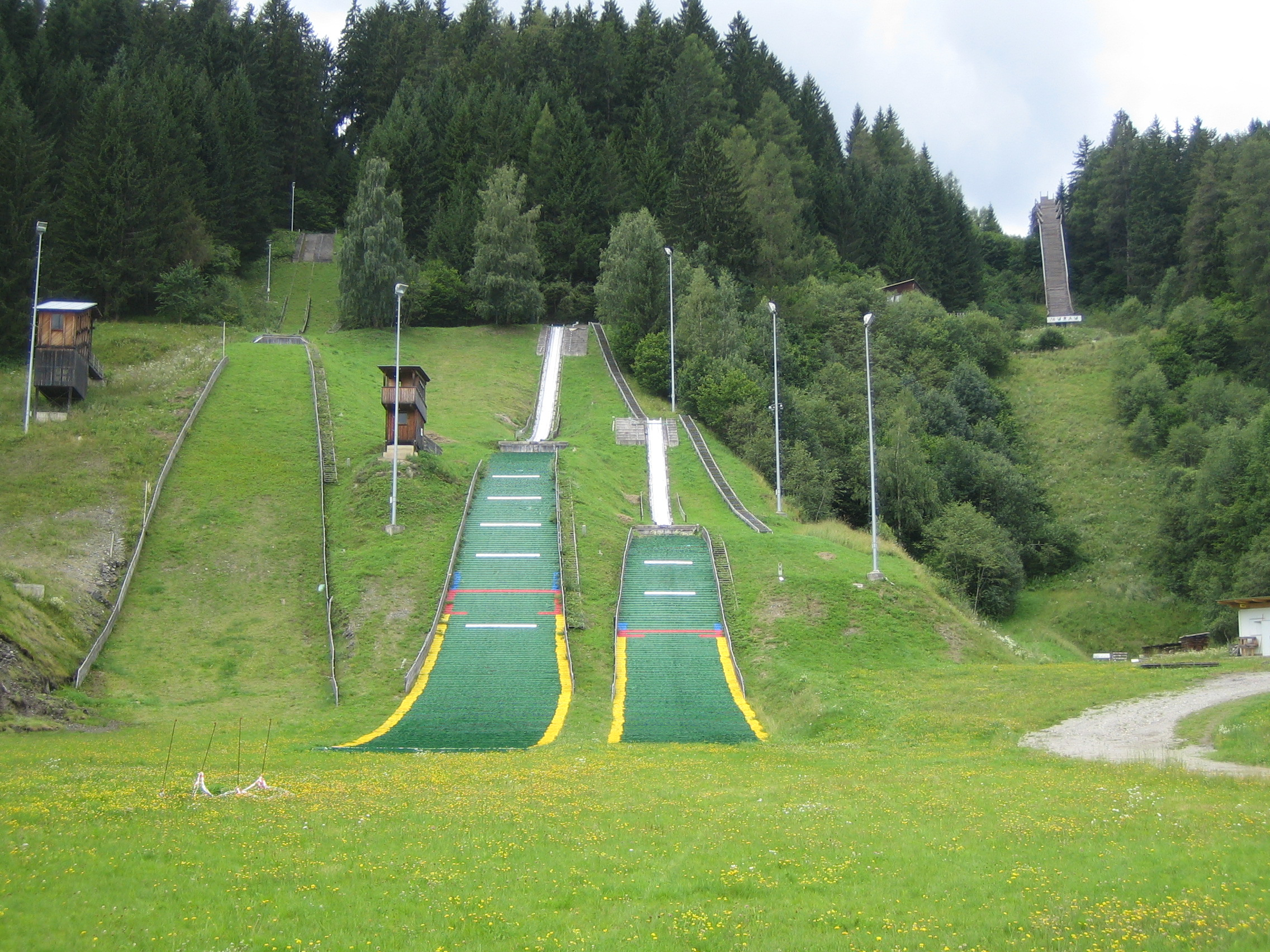
- Location: Murau; Austria
- Opened: 1936
- Renovated: 2005, 2007

Size
- K–point: K-85, K-60, K-35, K-20
- Hill size: HS 92
- Hill record: 86 m (282 ft) (Austria) Günther Stranner (6 February 2003)

Hans-Walland Großschanze
- Location: Murau; Austria
- Opened: 1968
- Renovated: 2005, 2007

Size
- K–point: K-120
- Hill record: 128.5 m (422 ft) (Norway) Bjarte Engen Vik (28 February 1996)

KLH-Arena consist of five ski jump hills in Murau, Austria. There are large, normal and three smaller hills.

== History ==
First jumps were performed in 1933. Gumpold-Schanze normal hill was opened in 1936 and Hans-Walland Großschanze large hill in 1968 one FIS Ski jumping World Cup event in 1994 on large hill.

== World Cup ==
=== Men ===
Date	Size	Winner	Second	Third
9 Jan 1994	K-120	(Japan) Noriaki Kasai	(Norway) Espen Bredesen	(Germany) Dieter Thoma
