= Stefan Horngacher =

Austrian ski jumper

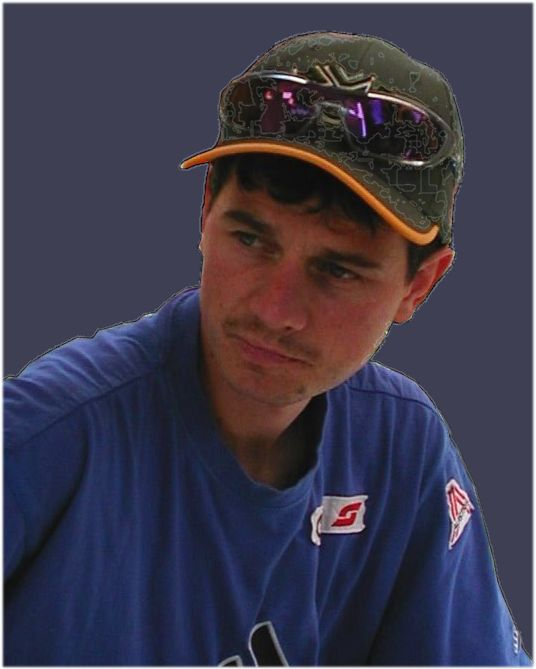
- Horngacher in 2000

Personal information
- Nationality: Austria
- Born: 20 September 1969 (age 56) Wörgl, Austria
- Height: 1.84 m (6 ft 1/2 in)

Sport
- Sport: Skiing

World Cup career
- Seasons: 1988–1994; 1996–2002
- Indiv. starts: 228
- Indiv. podiums: 15
- Indiv. wins: 2
- Team starts: 16
- Team podiums: 13
- Team wins: 4

Achievements and titles
- Personal bests: 203 m (666 ft); Planica, 16-18 March 2001
Medal record
Men's ski jumping
Olympic Games
Bronze medal – third place	1994 Lillehammer	Team LH
Bronze medal – third place	1998 Nagano	Team LH
FIS Nordic World Ski Championships
Gold medal – first place	1991 Val di Fiemme	Team LH
Gold medal – first place	2001 Lahti	Team NH
Bronze medal – third place	1993 Falun	Team LH
Bronze medal – third place	1999 Ramsau	Team LH
Bronze medal – third place	2001 Lahti	Team LH
- Updated on 10 February 2016

Stefan Horngacher (born 20 September 1969) is an Austrian ski jumping coach and former ski jumper. Since April 2019 he is coaching the German national team.

== Career ==
Horngacher won a bronze medal in the team large hill at the Winter Olympics in both 1994 and 1998. He also competed at the 2002 Winter Olympics in Salt Lake City, with his best finish being fourth in the team large hill event. At the 1991 Ski Jumping World Championships, he won gold in the team large hill event and followed that with three bronzes over the next ten years (1993, 1999 and 2001); he also won gold in the 2001 team normal hill event.

After retiring from the sport, he became a ski jumping coach and has coached the national Polish team since 2016.

- 2016–17 Four Hills Tournament, gold and silver
- FIS Nordic World Ski Championships 2017 – Team large hill, gold
- Coach of the year 2017 in Poland.
- 2017–18 Four Hills Tournament, gold and four consecutive wins

Since April 2019 he is coaching the German national team, succeeding Werner Schuster.

== World Cup ==
=== Standings ===
Season	Overall	4H	SF	NT	JP
1987/88	—	127	N/A	N/A	N/A
1988/89	—	96	N/A	N/A	N/A
1989/90	—	60	N/A	N/A	N/A
1990/91	4	5	2nd place, silver medalist(s)	N/A	N/A
1991/92	29	45	—	N/A	N/A
1992/93	8	—	14	N/A	N/A
1993/94	20	36	—	N/A	N/A
1995/96	35	40	32	N/A	34
1996/97	35	22	32	47	34
1997/98	13	8	28	18	12
1998/99	8	7	14	4	7
1999/00	9	11	18	20	9
2000/01	8	5	12	6	N/A
2001/02	12	12	N/A	12	N/A

=== Wins ===
No.	Season	Date	Location	Hill	Size
1	1990/91	24 February 1991	(Austria) Tauplitz/Bad Mitterndorf	Kulm K185	FH
2	1998/99	16 January 1999	(Poland) Zakopane	Wielka Krokiew K116	LH
