= Per-Inge Tällberg =

Swedish ski jumper

Personal information
- Nationality: Sweden
- Born: 14 June 1967 (age 59) Bollnäs, Sweden

Sport
- Sport: Skiing

Per-Inge Tällberg (born 14 June 1967) is a Swedish former ski jumper who competed from 1986 to 1993. He finished seventh in the team large hill event at the 1988 Winter Olympics in Calgary and 50th in the individual large hill event at Albertville in 1992.

Tällberg's best individual finish at the FIS Nordic World Ski Championships was 14th in the individual large hill at Val di Fiemme in 1991. He also finished 11th at the 1990 Ski-flying World Championships in Vikersund.

Tällberg's best World Cup finish was third in a flying hill event in Austria in 1991.

He is the older brother of Staffan Tällberg.
