= Vesa Hakala =

Finnish ski jumper

Medal record

Men's ski jumping

Representing Finland

World Championships
Silver medal – second place	1991 Val di Fiemme	Team large hill

Vesa Hakala (born 5 December 1968, in Harjavalta) is a Finnish former ski jumper who competed from 1986 to 1994. He won a silver medal in the team large hill at the 1991 FIS Nordic World Ski Championships in Val di Fiemme and finished 12th in the individual normal hill at the 1993 championships.

Hakala's best individual career finish was third in the individual large hill in Sapporo in 1990.
