= 1993–94 FIS Ski Jumping World Cup =

Ski jumping and flying circuit season

1993–94 World Cup
Winners
- Overall: (Norway) Espen Bredesen
- Ski Flying: (Czech Republic) Jaroslav Sakala
- Four Hills Tournament: (Norway) Espen Bredesen
- Bohemia Tournament: (Norway) Espen Bredesen
- Nations Cup: Norway

Competitions
- Venues: 14
- Individual: 19
- Team: 2
- Cancelled: 4

The 1993–94 FIS Ski Jumping World Cup was the 15th World Cup season in ski jumping and the 4th official World Cup season in ski flying with fourth small crystal globe awarded.

Season began in Planica, Slovenia on 11 December 1993 and finished in Thunder Bay, Canada on 27 March 1994. The individual World Cup overall winner was Espen Bredesen who became olympic champion and also set WR this season; Nations Cup was taken by Team of Norway.

19 men's individual events on 14 different venues in 11 countries were held on the three different continents (Europe, Asia and North America); and four individual events were cancelled due to strong wind in Lahti, Falun, Oslo and Planica. Also 2 men's team events were held.

History was made at Planica with the first ever jump over 200 metres. First ever was Andreas Goldberger, but he touched the snow at 202 metres. Toni Nieminen made first ever official (standing) jump at 203 m. Höllwarth (196 m) and Bredesen (209 m) also set WRs.

Peaks of the season were Winter Olympics FIS Nordic World Ski Championships (which also counted for World Cup), Four Hills Tournament and Bohemia Tournament.

== World records ==
List of world record distances (both official and invalid) achieved within this World Cup season.

Date	Athlete	Hill	Round	Place	Metres	Feet
17 March 1994	(Austria) Martin Höllwarth	Velikanka bratov Gorišek K185	V – jumper	Planica, Slovenia	196	643
17 March 1994	(Austria) Andreas Goldberger	Velikanka bratov Gorišek K185	Training – R1	Planica, Slovenia	202	663
17 March 1994	(Finland) Toni Nieminen	Velikanka bratov Gorišek K185	Training – R1	Planica, Slovenia	203	666
18 March 1994	(Germany) Christof Duffner	Velikanka bratov Gorišek K185	Training2 – R1	Planica, Slovenia	207	679
18 March 1994	(Norway) Espen Bredesen	Velikanka bratov Gorišek K185	Training2 – R1	Planica, Slovenia	209	686

Longest jump in history at that time, but invalid due to Goldberger (touch) and Duffner (falling) upon landing.

== Map of world cup hosts ==
Europe
Germany	Austria Asia	Canada

== Calendar ==
=== Men's Individual ===
N – normal hill / L – large hill / F – flying hill
All	No.	Date	Place (Hill)	Size	Winner	Second	Third	Overall leader	R.
314	1	11 December 1993	(Slovenia) Planica (Srednja Bloudkova K90) (Bloudkova velikanka K120)	N _{106}	(Norway) Espen Bredesen	(Japan) Takanobu Okabe	(Austria) Andreas Goldberger	(Norway) Espen Bredesen	
315	2	12 December 1993	(Slovenia) Planica (Srednja Bloudkova K90) (Bloudkova velikanka K120)	L _{183}	(Germany) Jens Weißflog	(Austria) Andreas Goldberger	(Norway) Espen Bredesen	(Norway) Espen Bredesen	
316	3	14 December 1993	(Italy) Predazzo (Trampolino dal Ben K90)	N _{107}	(Germany) Jens Weißflog	(Norway) Espen Bredesen	(Austria) Andreas Goldberger	(Germany) Jens Weißflog	
317	4	17 December 1993	(France) Courchevel (Tremplin du Praz K120)	L _{184}	(Austria) Andreas Goldberger	(Japan) Jinya Nishikata	(Czech Republic) Jaroslav Sakala	(Austria) Andreas Goldberger	
318	5	19 December 1993	(Switzerland) Engelberg (Gross-Titlis-Schanze K120)	L _{185}	(Finland) Janne Ahonen	(Switzerland) Sylvain Freiholz	(Norway) Bjørn Myrbakken	(Austria) Andreas Goldberger	
319	6	30 December 1993	(Germany) Oberstdorf (Schattenbergschanze K115)	L _{186}	(Germany) Jens Weißflog	(Norway) Espen Bredesen	(Austria) Andreas Goldberger	(Germany) Jens Weißflog	
320	7	1 January 1994	(Germany) Garmisch-Pa (Große Olympiaschanze K107)	L _{187}	(Norway) Espen Bredesen	(Germany) Jens Weißflog	(Japan) Takanobu Okabe	(Germany) Jens Weißflog	
321	8	4 January 1994	(Austria) Innsbruck (Bergiselschanze K109)	L _{188}	(Austria) Andreas Goldberger	(Germany) Jens Weißflog	(Japan) Noriaki Kasai	(Germany) Jens Weißflog	
322	9	6 January 1994	(Austria) Bischofshofen (Paul-Ausserleitner K120)	L _{189}	(Norway) Espen Bredesen	(Japan) Noriaki Kasai	(Germany) Jens Weißflog	(Germany) Jens Weißflog	
42nd Four Hills Tournament Overall (30 December 1993 – 6 January 1994)					(Norway) Espen Bredesen	(Germany) Jens Weißflog	(Austria) Andreas Goldberger	4H Tournament	
323	10	9 January 1994	(Austria) Murau (Hans-Walland Großschanze K120)	L _{190}	(Japan) Noriaki Kasai	(Norway) Espen Bredesen	(Germany) Dieter Thoma	(Norway) Espen Bredesen	
324	11	15 January 1994	(Czech Republic) Liberec (Ještěd A K120)	L _{191}	(Norway) Espen Bredesen	(Czech Republic) Jaroslav Sakala	(Italy) Roberto Cecon	(Norway) Espen Bredesen	
325	12	16 January 1994	(Czech Republic) Liberec (Ještěd A K120)	L _{192}	(Czech Republic) Jaroslav Sakala	(Norway) Espen Bredesen	(Norway) Lasse Ottesen	(Norway) Espen Bredesen	
29th Bohemia Tournament Overall (15 – 16 January 1994)					(Norway) Espen Bredesen	(Czech Republic) Jaroslav Sakala	(Norway) Lasse Ottesen	Bohemia Tournament	
326	13	22 January 1994	(Japan) Sapporo (Miyanomori K90) (Ōkurayama K115)	N _{108}	(Germany) Jens Weißflog	(Austria) Andreas Goldberger	(Czech Republic) Jiří Parma	(Norway) Espen Bredesen	
327	14	23 January 1994	(Japan) Sapporo (Miyanomori K90) (Ōkurayama K115)	L _{193}	(Germany) Jens Weißflog	(Japan) Jinya Nishikata	(Norway) Espen Bredesen	(Norway) Espen Bredesen	
1994 Winter Olympics (20 – 25 February • (Norway) Lillehammer)
328	15	5 March 1994	(Finland) Lahti (Salpausselkä K90, K114)	N _{109}	(Germany) Jens Weißflog	(Austria) Christian Moser	(Japan) Noriaki Kasai	(Norway) Espen Bredesen	
		6 March 1994	(Finland) Lahti (Salpausselkä K90, K114)	L _{cnx}	cancelled due to strong wind			—	
329	16	9 March 1994	(Sweden) Örnsköldsvik (Paradiskullen K90)	N _{110}	(Italy) Roberto Cecon	(Japan) Kenji Suda	(Germany) Jens Weißflog	(Norway) Espen Bredesen	
		11 March 1994	(Sweden) Falun (Lugnet K115)	L _{cnx}	cancelled due to strong wind			—	
		13 March 1994	(Norway) Oslo (Holmenkollbakken K110)	L _{cnx}	cancelled due to strong wind			—	
FIS World Cup 1993/94 = FIS Ski Flying World Championships 1994 (19 – 20 March • Planica)
		19 March 1994	(Slovenia) Planica (Velikanka bratov Gorišek K185)	F _{cnx}	first day of FIS SFWC = FIS WC cancelled de to strong wind			—	
330	17	20 March 1994	(Slovenia) Planica (Velikanka bratov Gorišek K185)	F _{027}	(Czech Republic) Jaroslav Sakala	(Norway) Espen Bredesen	(Italy) Roberto Cecon	(Norway) Espen Bredesen	
331	18	26 March 1994	(Canada) Thunder Bay (Big Thunder K90)	N _{111}	(Germany) Gerd Siegmund	(Austria) Andreas Goldberger	(Italy) Roberto Cecon	(Norway) Espen Bredesen	
332	19	27 March 1994	(Canada) Thunder Bay (Big Thunder K90)	N _{112}	(Germany) Jens Weißflog	(Japan) Takanobu Okabe	(Norway) Espen Bredesen	(Norway) Espen Bredesen	
15th FIS World Cup Overall (11 December 1993 – 27 March 1994)					(Norway) Espen Bredesen	(Germany) Jens Weißflog	(Austria) Andreas Goldberger	World Cup Overall	

=== Men's Team ===
All	No.	Date	Place (Hill)	Size	Winner	Second	Third	R.
5	1	5 March 1994	(Finland) Lahti (Salpausselkä K114)	L _{005}	Austria Stefan Horngacher; Heinz Kuttin; Christian Moser; Andreas Goldberger	Japan Jinya Nishikata; Kenji Suda; Takanobu Okabe; Noriaki Kasai	Norway Bjørn Myrbakken; Øyvind Berg; Lasse Ottesen; Espen Bredesen	
6	2	25 March 1994	(Canada) Thunder Bay (Big Thunder K120)	L _{006}	Germany Gerd Siegmund; Christof Duffner; Hansjörg Jäkle; Jens Weißflog	Austria Werner Rathmayr; Christian Moser; Heinz Kuttin; Andreas Goldberger	Norway Lasse Ottesen; Øyvind Berg; Stein Hendrik Tuff; Espen Bredesen	

== Standings ==
=== Overall ===
Rank	after 19 events	Points
1	(Norway) Espen Bredesen	1203
2	(Germany) Jens Weißflog	1110
3	(Austria) Andreas Goldberger	927
4	(Czech Republic) Jaroslav Sakala	751
5	(Italy) Roberto Cecon	710
6	(Japan) Noriaki Kasai	562
7	(Japan) Takanobu Okabe	529
8	(Japan) Jinya Nishikata	482
9	(Norway) Lasse Ottesen	421
10	(Finland) Janne Ahonen	388

=== Ski Flying ===
Rank	after 1 event	Points
1	(Czech Republic) Jaroslav Sakala	100
2	(Norway) Espen Bredesen	80
3	(Italy) Roberto Cecon	60
4	(Germany) Christof Duffner	50
5	(Norway) Lasse Ottesen	45
6	(Switzerland) Stephan Zünd	40
7	(Finland) Toni Nieminen	36
8	(Norway) Kurt Børset	32
9	(Finland) Jani Soininen	29
10	(Germany) Hansjörg Jäkle	26

=== Nations Cup ===
Rank	after 21 events	Points
1	Norway	2537
2	Japan	2444
3	Austria	2355
4	Germany	2298
5	Finland	1626
6	Czech Republic	1536
7	Italy	789
8	France	650
9	Switzerland	317
10	Slovenia	272

=== Four Hills Tournament ===
Rank	after 4 events	Points
1	(Norway) Espen Bredesen	931.3
2	(Germany) Jens Weissflog	923.3
3	(Austria) Andreas Goldberger	891.8
4	(Japan) Noriaki Kasai	848.2
5	(Czech Republic) Jaroslav Sakala	845.5
6	(Italy) Roberto Cecon	841.8
7	(Austria) Heinz Kuttin	815.1
8	(Germany) Dieter Thoma	781.6
9	(Finland) Janne Väätäinen	771.2
10	(Norway) Roar Ljøkelsøy	754.9

=== Bohemia Tournament ===
Rank	after 2 events	Points
1	(Norway) Espen Bredesen	459.3
2	(Czech Republic) Jaroslav Sakala	451.3
3	(Norway) Lasse Ottesen	410.4
4	(Italy) Roberto Cecon	409.1
5	(Finland) Janne Ahonen	390.5
6	(Germany) Robert Meglič	378.7
7	(Austria) Andreas Goldberger	370.9
8	(Czech Republic) Ladislav Dluhoš	363.3
9	(Czech Republic) Jiří Parma	362.9
10	(Austria) Heinz Kuttin	349.8

== See also ==
- 1993–94 FIS Continental Cup (2nd level competition)
