= Heinz Kuttin =

Austrian ski jumper (born 1971)

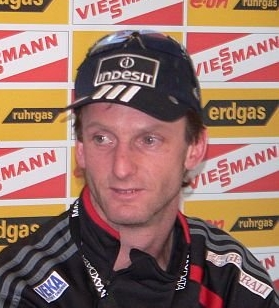

Personal information
- Nationality: Austria
- Born: 5 January 1971 (age 55) Gassen, Austria
- Height: 193 cm (6 ft 4 in)

Sport
- Sport: Skiing

World Cup career
- Seasons: 1988–1995
- Indiv. starts: 102
- Indiv. podiums: 13
- Indiv. wins: 2
- Team starts: 3
- Team podiums: 3
- Team wins: 2
Medal record
Men's ski jumping
Olympic Games
Silver medal – second place	1992 Albertville	Team LH
Bronze medal – third place	1992 Albertville	Individual LH
Bronze medal – third place	1994 Lillehammer	Team LH
FIS Nordic World Ski Championships
Gold medal – first place	1991 Val di Fiemme	Individual NH
Gold medal – first place	1991 Val di Fiemme	Team LH
Bronze medal – third place	1989 Lahti	Individual NH
Bronze medal – third place	1993 Falun	Team LH
- Updated on 10 February 2016

Heinz Kuttin (born 5 January 1971) is an Austrian former ski jumper.

== Career ==
At the 1992 Winter Olympics in Albertville, he won a silver medal in the Team large hill and a bronze medal in the Individual large hill. At the 1994 Winter Olympics in Lillehammer, he won a bronze medal in the Team large hill.

Kuttin's biggest successes were at the FIS Nordic World Ski Championships where he earned four medals, including two golds (Individual normal hill and Team large hill: 1991) and two bronzes (Team large hill: 1993; Individual normal hill: 1989). He worked as an assistant coach of the Austrian national team in 2002–2003, coached the Polish B team in 2003 and then the Polish national team from 2004 to 2006.

Since as of 2014 he is the official head coach of the national Austrian ski jumping team after the retirement of the prior coach Alexander Pointner.

== World Cup ==
=== Standings ===
Season	Overall	4H	SF
1987/88	26	25	N/A
1988/89	39	82	N/A
1989/90	8	10	N/A
1990/91	7	51	6
1991/92	11	46	—
1992/93	19	9	—
1993/94	12	7	—
1994/95	67	34	—

=== Wins ===
No.	Season	Date	Location	Hill	Size
1	1990/91	13 March 1991	(Norway) Trondheim	Granåsen K120	LH
2	1991/92	8 March 1992	(Norway) Trondheim	Granåsen K120	LH
