= Øyvind Berg (ski jumper) =

Norwegian ski jumper

Medal record

Men's ski jumping

Representing Norway

World Championships
Gold medal – first place	1993 Falun	Team large hill

Øyvind Berg (born March 10, 1971, in Løken) is a Norwegian former ski jumper who competed from 1983 to 1996. He represented the sports club Høland IL.

He won a gold medal in the team large hill at the 1993 FIS Nordic World Ski Championships and finished 22nd in the individual normal hill at those same championships.

Berg's best individual finish at the Winter Olympics was 17th in the individual large hill at Lillehammer in 1994. His best individual career finish was third in Trondheim in 1991.

Berg stated as the reason for his retirement, that he had "enough of puking" (Ski jumping#Health risks).
