= Letalnica bratov Gorišek =

Ski flying hill in Planica, Slovenia

Coordinates: 46°28′35″N 13°43′16″E

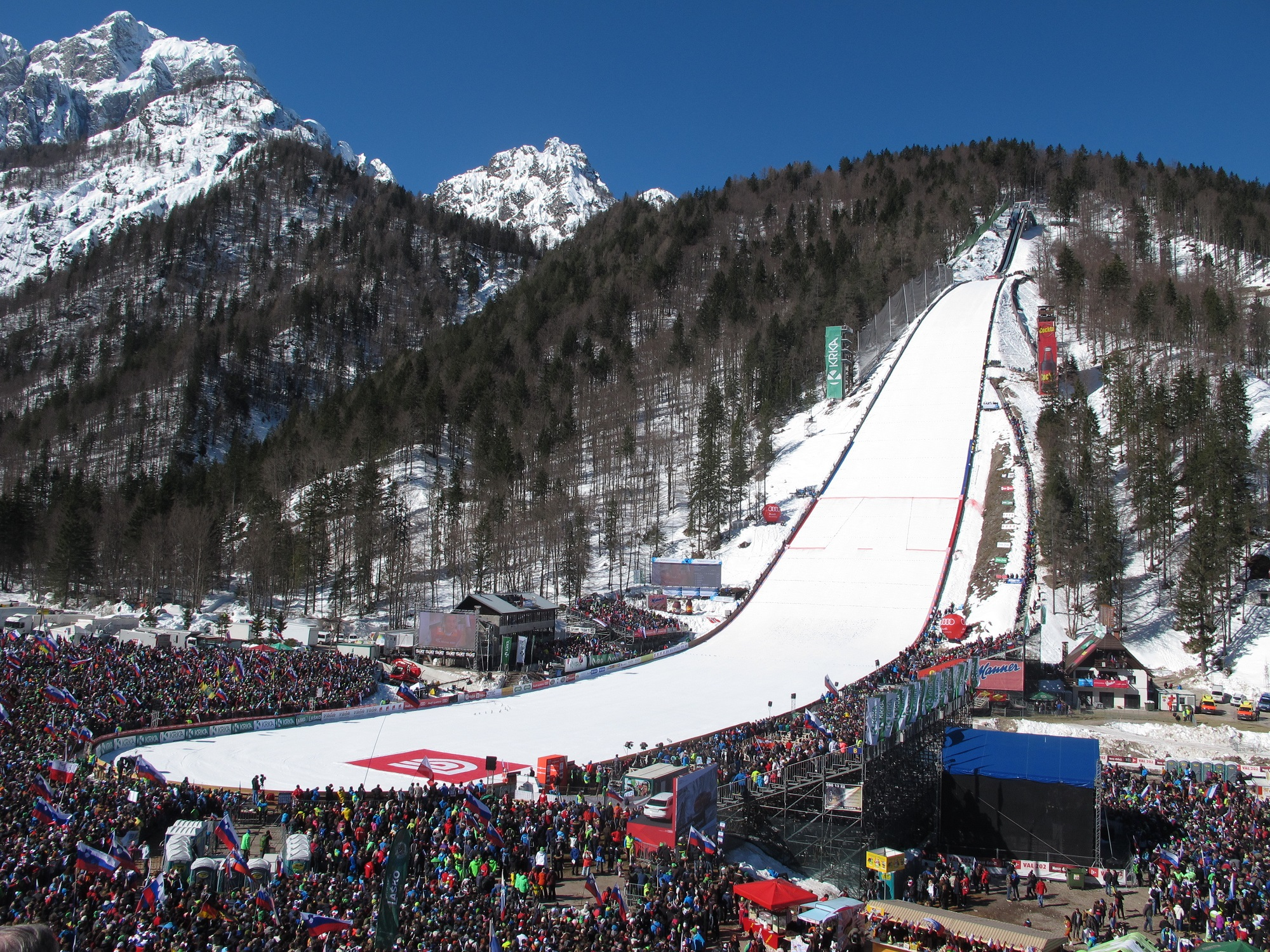
- Letalnica bratov Gorišek in 2016
- Constructor: Janez Gorišek (planning); Vlado Gorišek (execution)
- Location: Planica, Slovenia
- Operator: ZŠRS Planica
- Opened: 6 March 1969 (test); 21 March 1969 (official)
- Renovated: 1984, 1990s, 2009–2010, 2013–2015
- Expanded: 1979, 1985, 1994, 2000, 2003, 2005, 2010, 2015

Size
- K–point: 200 metres (660 ft)
- Hill size: 240 metres (790 ft)
- Hill record: 254.5 metres (835 ft) (Slovenia) Domen Prevc (30 March 2025)

Top events
- Ski Flying World Championships: 1972, 1979, 1985, 1994, 2004, 2010, 2020

Letalnica bratov Gorišek (English: The Gorišek Brothers Ski Flying Hill) is one of the two largest ski flying hills in the world and the biggest of eight hills located at the Planica Nordic Centre in Planica, Slovenia.

It was built in 1969 and is named after the original constructors and brothers Vlado and Janez Gorišek. Since its opening, a total of 30 world records (29 for men and 1 for women) have been set at the venue.

Yugoslav ski jumper Miro Oman made the inaugural test jump of 135 metres (443 ft) on 6 March 1969. The first FIS Ski Flying World Championships were organized on the hill in 1972. After Matti Nykänen set a world record jump of 191 metres (627 ft) at the 1985 FIS Ski Flying World Championships, a new rule was instituted by the International Ski Federation that awarded no additional points for jumps over this distance due to safety reasons. The rule was abolished in 1994.

On 17 March 1994, Andreas Goldberger touched the snow with his hand at 202 metres (663 ft) for the first, albeit disqualified, over 200-metre jump. Just a few minutes later Toni Nieminen landed on his feet at 203 metres (666 ft) and officially became the first man in history to jump over 200 metres.

Letalnica bratov Gorišek is a regular venue of the FIS Ski Jumping World Cup, and has hosted the FIS Ski Flying World Championships on seven occasions, most recently in 2020. Since 2012, it also hosts the Red Bull 400 world series, the world's steepest 400-metre race. The world's steepest zip line with an average incline of 38 degrees opened at the hill in September 2015.

During the Ski Flying World Championships in 1985, the venue's highest all-time attendance was recorded when a total of 150,000 people gathered over three days.

== History ==
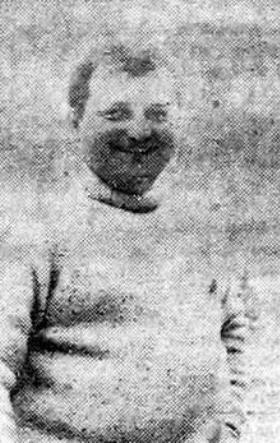
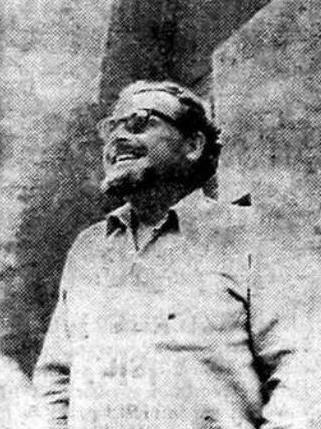
Janez (left) and Vlado (right) Gorišek in 1969

=== 1969–1972: Opening and the first World Championships ===
Velikanka bratov Gorišek (original name) was planned, constructed and developed by Slovenian constructors, engineers and brothers, Vlado and Janez Gorišek. At the time, a lead engineer of Planica was Stano Pelan, who proposed to enlarge Bloudkova velikanka; however, Vlado Gorišek suggested to build a completely new venue instead. In the mid-1960s, Janez Gorišek was working as an engineer in Libya, where he prepared a plan and profile for a new hill. Construction began in 1967 and was completed by the end of 1968. During the construction, Janez was still working in Libya, so his older brother Vlado was fully in charge of the construction site. Initially, the construction point was at K153 with a 145-metre long inrun.

On 6 March 1969, two weeks before the competition, a hill test with trial jumper was made. Miro Oman made an inaugural jump and landed at 135 metres (443 ft). On 21 March 1969, the first day of the KOP Ski Flying Week competition, the venue was officially opened with the first world record distance, set at 156 metres (512 ft) by Bjørn Wirkola. The next day, the world record was tied and improved three times, by Jiří Raška (156 and 164 metres) and Bjørn Wirkola (160 metres). On the final day of competition, in front of 45,000 spectators, Manfred Wolf set the world record at 165 metres (541 ft) in the last round. Jiří Raška won the three-day event.

In 1972, the hill hosted the first FIS Ski Flying World Championships. Swiss ski jumper Walter Steiner became the first ski flying world champion in a three-day competition, which attracted around 110,000 spectators.

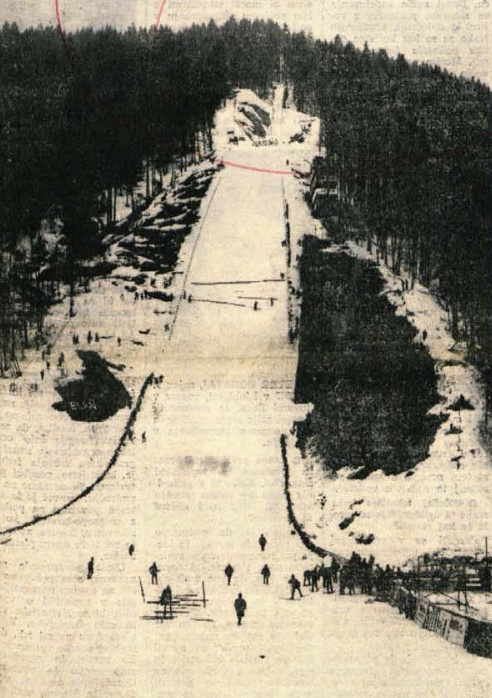
Inaugural event in 1969

=== 1974–1979: Steiner, Norčič and World Championships ===
On 15 March 1974, the second KOP Ski Flying Week competition started. The day started with a tied world record at 169 metres (554 ft), set by Walter Steiner in the trial round. In the first round, which was interrupted twice, Steiner crashed at 177 metres (581 ft), a new world record distance. In the last day of competition, Steiner confirmed his domination through the whole weekend and won in Planica for the second consecutive time.

«I was very surprised and didn't expect such a great jump. I didn't really aim for a world record at all. I just wanted to make a good jump. I had no expectations, didn't care at all and that's probably why I set a world record.»

— Toni Nieminen, after setting the WR in 1994 (203 m)

«Without any doubt this is my greatest career and life achievement. Nothing can be compared with this world record. Not even my gold medal at the Olympics or the World Championships. Now I know how birds feel when they fly in the air.»

— Espen Bredesen, after setting the WR in 1994 (209 m)

In 1977, the third KOP Ski Flying Week competition was held. During the trial round, Bogdan Norčič touched the ground at 181 metres (594 ft), which would have been a new world record, and the first jump over 180 metres in history. Reinhold Bachler from Austria won the three-day competition with the best round from each day counted into the final result.

In 1979, Letalnica bratov Gorišek hosted the fifth ski flying World Championships. Axel Zitzmann crashed at a world record distance of 179 metres (587 ft), while the second round was cancelled and repeated. Klaus Ostwald tied the world record at 176 metres (577 ft), and Armin Kogler became world champion.

=== 1985–1987: Record-breaking attendance with Nykänen ===
In 1984, to celebrate the 50th anniversary of Planica, the organizing committee decided to modernize the hill. Major renovation works were carried out in the summer and autumn of 1984, with the Yugoslav Army personnel, volunteers and different working organizations helping at the construction site under the command of Gorišek brothers. 1,500 cubic metres of material was excavated and filled into the landing zone. They also excavated 300 cubic metres of material from the inrun. The old wooden tower was replaced by a steel one, and the take-off table was pushed back for five metres.

In 1985, the eighth ski flying World Championships were held in Planica, with the venue's highest all-time total attendance record of 150,000 people, and the single-event record of 80,000 people. Three world records were set during the event, by Mike Holland (186 metres) and Matti Nykänen (187 and 191 metres). Nykänen has also won the World Championship. In 1986, a new rule was instituted by the International Ski Federation that awarded no additional points for jumps over 191 metres due to safety reasons.

In the 1987 season, Letalnica bratov Gorišek hosted the World Cup event for the first time. On the first day, during a training session, Andreas Felder touched the ground at a world record distance of 192 metres (630 ft). The next day, Polish ski jumper Piotr Fijas set the last parallel style world record on the first day of competition when he jumped 194 metres (636 ft) in the third round, which was cancelled and repeated right after his jump. His world record was officially recognized seven years later.

=== 1991: Kiessewetter with the all-time longest parallel jump ===
On 23 March 1991, during the second round, André Kiesewetter touched the ground at a world record distance of 196 metres (643 ft), the all-time longest parallel style ski jump in history. In the third round, Stephan Zünd and Kiesewetter landed at 191 metres (627 ft). The next day, Ralph Gebstedt landed at 190 metres (620 ft) in the third round and won the competition.

=== 1994: First jump over 200 metres ===
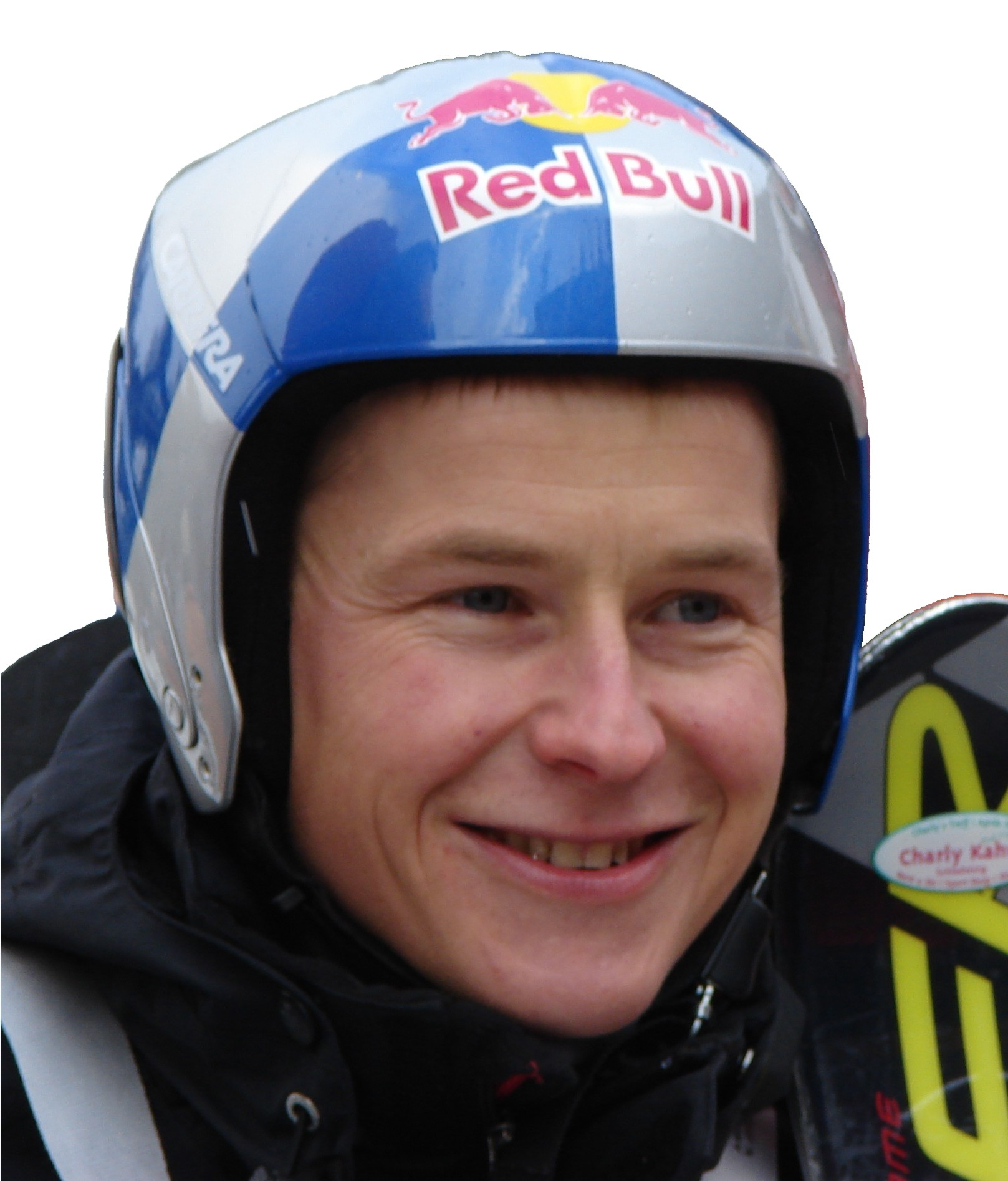
In 1994, Andreas Goldberger became the first competitor to jump over 200 metres; however, his attempt was considered invalid.

On 17 March 1994, during the 1994 Ski Flying World Championships, Martin Höllwarth set a new world record at 196 metres (643 ft) as a test jumper. Austrian ski jumper Andreas Goldberger landed at 202 metres (663 ft), making the first jump over 200 metres; however, he touched the snow with his hands, and the jump was counted as invalid. Just a few minutes later, Finnish ski jumper Toni Nieminen landed on his feet at 203 metres (666 ft) and officially became the first man in history who jumped over 200 metres.

It continued with Christof Duffner the next day who crashed from a huge height at 207 metres (679 ft). Later that day, Espen Bredesen set the third world record of the year at 209 metres (686 ft).

=== 1997–2003: Peterka, ski jumping hysteria in Slovenia and more world records ===
In 1997, ski jumping hysteria spread all over Slovenia due to Primož Peterka, who was battling with Dieter Thoma for the first Slovenian overall title. Over 120,000 people gathered in three days, with over 60,000 people alone on the decisive Saturday when two world records (210 and 212 metres) were set by Espen Bredesen and Lasse Ottesen, respectively. Peterka won the overall title.

In 1999, the four-day event was attended by over 80,000 people. Two world records were broken during the competition, set at 214.5 metres (704 ft) by Martin Schmitt and 219.5 metres (720 ft) by Tommy Ingebrigtsen.

On 16 March 2000, during the official training session, Austrian ski jumper Thomas Hörl set a world record at 224.5 metres (737 ft). Two days later the first ski flying team event was held with another world record set by Andreas Goldberger, who landed at 225 metres (738 ft).

In 2003, four world records were set. Adam Małysz tied the record at 225 metres (738 ft) and Matti Hautamäki broke the record three times (227.5, 228 and 231 metres). Over 120,000 visitors gathered in four days.

=== 2005–2010: Four world records in one day and adjustments ===
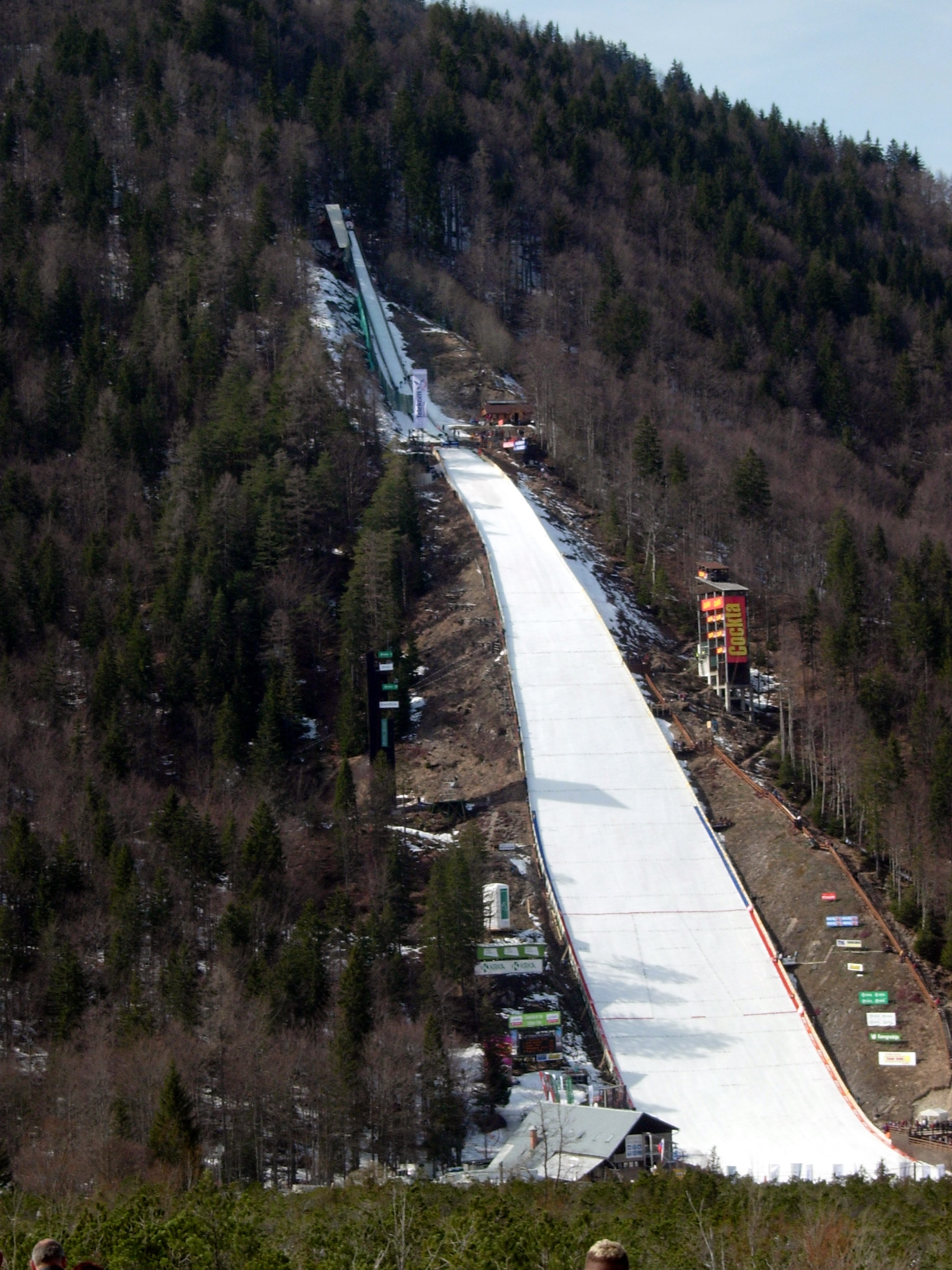
Letalnica in 2008

On 20 March 2005, four world records were set during the final round: Tommy Ingebrigtsen with 231 metres (758 ft), Matti Hautamäki with 235.5 metres (773 ft), and Bjørn Einar Romøren twice, with 234.5 metres (769 ft) and 239 metres (784 ft). Janne Ahonen also crashed at 240 metres (790 ft) and was slightly injured.

In 2010, Letalnica got the new chairlift, renovated judge tower, landing zone widened, profile adjusted, and take-off angle lowered to keep competitors closer to the ground. All this was needed to fulfill the International Ski Federation requirements to host the 2010 Ski Flying World Championships where Simon Ammann became world champion.

=== 2015–present: Renovations, Prevc's record-breaking season and a new hill record ===
Between 2013 and 2015, the hill underwent a major renovation. A new profile was drawn by Janez Gorišek with the help of his son Sebastjan Gorišek, who is also a constructor. The hill's new construction point was at K200 and the hill size at HS225. They built a completely new concrete inrun, replacing the old steel construction. The take-off table was moved five metres higher and pushed back for twelve metres compared to the old one.

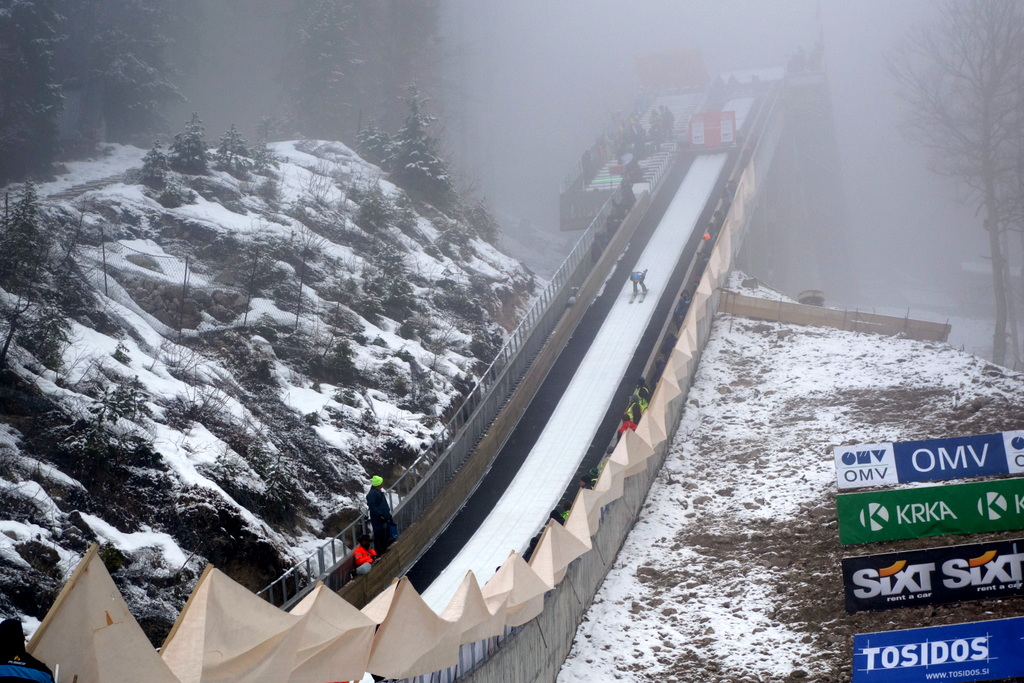
New inrun in 2015

The battle for the 2014–15 World Cup overall title between Severin Freund and Peter Prevc lasted until the last jump of the season, which concluded at the newly renovated venue in March 2015. Freund took the overall title since he had more wins during the season, although they had the same number of points.

In 2016, Prevc took the overall title in a record-breaking season in which he accumulated 15 wins, with a total of 111,000 people gathering in five days. During the test event, Tilen Bartol crashed at 252 metres (827 ft), the second longest flight in the history of ski jumping at the time, and half a metre longer than the official world record.

On 22 March 2018, in the qualification round, Gregor Schlierenzauer touched the ground at 253.5 metres (832 ft) and tied the world record distance.

On 24 March 2019, Ryoyu Kobayashi set the hill record at 252 metres (827 ft) and won the first overall title for Japan.

In 2020, the 26th FIS Ski Flying World Championships in Planica were originally scheduled for March, but the event was postponed to December due to the COVID-19 pandemic.

Before the finals of the 2023–24 World Cup season, new ice tracks were installed as part of the renovation of the inrun, mainly due to the high temperatures that caused the inrun to thaw if it was not protected from the sun.

== Events ==
Year	Date	Hill size	Winner	Second place	Third place
K.O.P. Ski Flying Week
1969	21–23 March	K153	(Czechoslovakia) Jiří Raška	(Norway) Bjørn Wirkola	(East Germany) Manfred Wolf
FIS Ski Flying World Championships 1972
1972	25 March	K165	(Switzerland) Walter Steiner	(East Germany) Heinz Wosipiwo	(Czechoslovakia) Jiří Raška
K.O.P. Ski Flying Week
1974	15–17 March	K165	(Switzerland) Walter Steiner	(Finland) Esko Rautionaho	(Norway) Dag Fossum
1977	18–20 March	K165	(Austria) Reinhold Bachler	(East Germany) Thomas Meisinger	(Czechoslovakia) Ladislav Jirásko
FIS Ski Flying World Championships 1979
1979	17–18 March	K165	(Austria) Armin Kogler	(East Germany) Axel Zitzmann	(Poland) Piotr Fijas
FIS Ski Flying World Championships 1985
1985	16–17 March	K185	(Finland) Matti Nykänen	(East Germany) Jens Weißflog	(Czechoslovakia) Pavel Ploc
FIS World Cup
1987	14 March	K185	(Austria) Andreas Felder	(Norway) Ole Gunnar Fidjestøl	(West Germany) Thomas Klauser
1987	15 March	K185	(Norway) Ole Gunnar Fidjestøl	(Socialist Federal Republic of Yugoslavia) Matjaž Zupan	(Poland) Piotr Fijas
1991	23 March	K185	(Sweden) Staffan Tällberg	(Switzerland) Stephan Zünd	(Germany) André Kiesewetter
1991	24 March	K185	(Germany) Ralph Gebstedt	(Austria) Stefan Horngacher	(Germany) Dieter Thoma
FIS Ski Flying World Championships 1994 and FIS World Cup
1994	20 March	K185	(Czech Republic) Jaroslav Sakala	(Norway) Espen Bredesen	(Italy) Roberto Cecon
FIS World Cup
1997	22 March	K185	(Japan) Takanobu Okabe	(Japan) Kazuyoshi Funaki	(Finland) Jani Soininen
1997	23 March	K185	(Japan) Akira Higashi	(Slovenia) Primož Peterka	(Norway) Lasse Ottesen
1999	19 March	K185	(Germany) Martin Schmitt	(Japan) Kazuyoshi Funaki	(Germany) Christof Duffner
1999	20 March	K185	(Japan) Hideharu Miyahira	(Germany) Martin Schmitt	(Japan) Noriaki Kasai
1999	21 March	K185	(Japan) Noriaki Kasai	(Japan) Hideharu Miyahira	(Germany) Martin Schmitt
2000	18 March	K185	Germany	Finland	Japan
2000	19 March	K185	(Germany) Sven Hannawald	(Finland) Janne Ahonen	(Austria) Andreas Goldberger
2001	17 March	K185	Finland	Austria	Japan
2001	18 March	K185	(Germany) Martin Schmitt	(Finland) Risto Jussilainen	(Norway) Tommy Ingebrigtsen
2002	23 March	K185	Finland	Germany	Austria
2003	21 March	K185	Finland	Norway	Austria
2003	22 March	K185	(Finland) Matti Hautamäki	(Poland) Adam Małysz	(Austria) Martin Höllwarth
2003	23 March	K185	(Finland) Matti Hautamäki	(Germany) Sven Hannawald	(Japan) Hideharu Miyahira
FIS Ski Flying World Championships 2004
2004	20–21 February	K185	(Norway) Roar Ljøkelsøy	(Finland) Janne Ahonen	(Finland) Tami Kiuru
2004	22 February	K185	Norway	Finland	Austria
FIS World Cup
2005	19 March	HS215	(Finland) Matti Hautamäki	(Austria) Andreas Widhölzl	(Norway) Bjørn Einar Romøren
2005	20 March	HS215	(Norway) Bjørn Einar Romøren	(Norway) Roar Ljøkelsøy	(Austria) Andreas Widhölzl
2006	18 March	HS215	(Norway) Bjørn Einar Romøren	(Norway) Roar Ljøkelsøy	(Austria) Martin Koch
2006	19 March	HS215	(Finland) Janne Happonen	(Austria) Martin Koch	(Slovenia) Robert Kranjec
2007	23 March	HS215	(Poland) Adam Małysz	(Switzerland) Simon Ammann	(Slovenia) Jernej Damjan
2007	24 March	HS215	(Poland) Adam Małysz	(Norway) Anders Jacobsen	(Austria) Martin Koch
2007	25 March	HS215	(Poland) Adam Małysz	(Switzerland) Simon Ammann	(Austria) Martin Koch
2008	14 March	HS215	(Austria) Gregor Schlierenzauer	(Finland) Janne Ahonen	(Norway) Bjørn Einar Romøren
2008	15 March	HS215	Norway	Finland	Austria
2008	16 March	HS215	(Austria) Gregor Schlierenzauer	(Austria) Martin Koch	(Finland) Janne Happonen
2009	20 March	HS215	(Austria) Gregor Schlierenzauer	(Poland) Adam Małysz	(Russia) Dimitry Vassiliev
2009	21 March	HS215	Norway	Poland	Russia
2009	22 March	HS215	(Finland) Harri Olli	(Poland) Adam Małysz	(Switzerland) Simon Ammann (Slovenia) Robert Kranjec
FIS Ski Flying World Championships 2010
2010	19–20 March	HS215	(Switzerland) Simon Ammann	(Austria) Gregor Schlierenzauer	(Norway) Anders Jacobsen
2010	21 March	HS215	Austria	Norway	Finland
FIS World Cup
2011	18 March	HS215	(Austria) Gregor Schlierenzauer	(Austria) Thomas Morgenstern	(Austria) Martin Koch
2011	19 March	HS215	Austria	Norway	Slovenia
2011	20 March	HS215	(Poland) Kamil Stoch	(Slovenia) Robert Kranjec	(Poland) Adam Małysz
2012	16 March	HS215	(Slovenia) Robert Kranjec	(Switzerland) Simon Ammann	(Austria) Martin Koch
2012	17 March	HS215	Austria	Norway	Germany
2012	18 March	HS215	(Austria) Martin Koch	(Switzerland) Simon Ammann	(Slovenia) Robert Kranjec
2013	22 March	HS215	(Austria) Gregor Schlierenzauer	(Slovenia) Peter Prevc	(Poland) Piotr Żyła
2013	23 March	HS215	Slovenia	Norway	Austria
2013	24 March	HS215	(Slovenia) Jurij Tepeš	(Norway) Rune Velta	(Slovenia) Peter Prevc
2015	20 March	HS225	(Slovenia) Peter Prevc	(Slovenia) Jurij Tepeš	(Austria) Stefan Kraft
2015	21 March	HS225	Slovenia	Austria	Norway
2015	22 March	HS225	(Slovenia) Jurij Tepeš	(Slovenia) Peter Prevc	(Norway) Rune Velta
2016	17 March	HS225	(Slovenia) Peter Prevc	(Norway) Johann André Forfang	(Slovenia) Robert Kranjec
2016	18 March	HS225	(Slovenia) Robert Kranjec	(Slovenia) Peter Prevc	(Norway) Johann André Forfang
2016	19 March	HS225	Norway	Slovenia	Austria
2016	20 March	HS225	(Slovenia) Peter Prevc	(Slovenia) Robert Kranjec	(Norway) Johann André Forfang
2017	24 March	HS225	(Austria) Stefan Kraft	(Germany) Andreas Wellinger	(Germany) Markus Eisenbichler
2017	25 March	HS225	Norway	Germany	Poland
2017	26 March	HS225	(Austria) Stefan Kraft	(Germany) Andreas Wellinger	(Japan) Noriaki Kasai
2018	23 March	HS240	(Poland) Kamil Stoch	(Norway) Johann André Forfang	(Austria) Stefan Kraft
2018	24 March	HS240	Norway	Germany	Slovenia
2018	25 March	HS240	(Poland) Kamil Stoch	(Austria) Stefan Kraft	(Norway) Daniel-André Tande
2019	22 March	HS240	(Germany) Markus Eisenbichler	(Japan) Ryōyū Kobayashi	(Poland) Piotr Żyła
2019	23 March	HS240	Poland	Germany	Slovenia
2019	24 March	HS240	(Japan) Ryōyū Kobayashi	(Slovenia) Domen Prevc	(Germany) Markus Eisenbichler
FIS Ski Flying World Championships 2020
2020	11–12 December	HS240	(Germany) Karl Geiger	(Norway) Halvor Egner Granerud	(Germany) Markus Eisenbichler
2020	13 December	HS240	Norway	Germany	Poland
FIS World Cup
2021	25 March	HS240	(Japan) Ryōyū Kobayashi	(Germany) Markus Eisenbichler	(Germany) Karl Geiger
2021	26 March	HS240	(Germany) Karl Geiger	(Japan) Ryōyū Kobayashi	(Slovenia) Bor Pavlovčič
2021	28 March	HS240	Germany	Japan	Austria
2021	28 March	HS240	(Germany) Karl Geiger	(Japan) Ryōyū Kobayashi	(Germany) Markus Eisenbichler
2022	25 March	HS240	(Slovenia) Žiga Jelar	(Slovenia) Peter Prevc	(Slovenia) Anže Lanišek
2022	26 March	HS240	Slovenia	Norway	Austria
2022	27 March	HS240	(Norway) Marius Lindvik	(Japan) Yukiya Satō	(Slovenia) Peter Prevc
2023	1 April	HS240	(Austria) Stefan Kraft	(Slovenia) Anže Lanišek	(Poland) Piotr Żyła
2023	1 April	HS240	Austria	Slovenia	Norway
2023	2 April	HS240	(Slovenia) Timi Zajc	(Slovenia) Anže Lanišek	(Austria) Stefan Kraft
2024	22 March	HS240	(Slovenia) Peter Prevc	(Austria) Daniel Huber	(Norway) Johann André Forfang
2024	23 March	HS240	Austria	Slovenia	Norway
2024	24 March	HS240	(Austria) Daniel Huber	(Slovenia) Domen Prevc	(Poland) Aleksander Zniszczoł
2025	28 March	HS240	(Slovenia) Domen Prevc	(Slovenia) Anže Lanišek	(Japan) Ryōyū Kobayashi
2025	29 March	HS240	Austria	Germany	Slovenia
2025	30 March	HS240	(Slovenia) Anže Lanišek	(Slovenia) Domen Prevc	(Germany) Andreas Wellinger
2026	27 March	HS240	(Slovenia) Domen Prevc	(Japan) Ren Nikaidō	(Austria) Daniel Tschofenig
2026	28 March	HS240	Austria	Japan	Norway
2026	29 March	HS240	(Norway) Marius Lindvik	(Slovenia) Domen Prevc	(Norway) Johann André Forfang

== List of world records ==
A total of 30 official world records (29 for men and 1 for women) have been set at the hill.

=== Men ===
No.	Date	Athlete	Length
64	21 March 1969	(Norway) Bjørn Wirkola	156 metres (512 ft)
65	22 March 1969	(Czechoslovakia) Jiří Raška	156 metres (512 ft)
66	22 March 1969	(Norway) Bjørn Wirkola	160 metres (520 ft)
67	22 March 1969	(Czechoslovakia) Jiří Raška	164 metres (538 ft)
68	23 March 1969	(East Germany) Manfred Wolf	165 metres (541 ft)
70	15 March 1974	(Switzerland) Walter Steiner	169 metres (554 ft)
75	18 March 1979	(East Germany) Klaus Ostwald	176 metres (577 ft)
82	15 March 1985	(United States) Mike Holland	186 metres (610 ft)
83	15 March 1985	(Finland) Matti Nykänen	187 metres (614 ft)
84	15 March 1985	(Finland) Matti Nykänen	191 metres (627 ft)
86	14 March 1987	(Poland) Piotr Fijas	194 metres (636 ft)
87	17 March 1994	(Austria) Martin Höllwarth	196 metres (643 ft)
88	17 March 1994	(Finland) Toni Nieminen	203 metres (666 ft)
89	18 March 1994	(Norway) Espen Bredesen	209 metres (686 ft)
90	22 March 1997	(Norway) Espen Bredesen	210 metres (690 ft)

No.	Date	Athlete	Length
91	22 March 1997	(Norway) Lasse Ottesen	212 metres (696 ft)
92	19 March 1999	(Germany) Martin Schmitt	214.5 metres (704 ft)
93	20 March 1999	(Norway) Tommy Ingebrigtsen	219.5 metres (720 ft)
94	16 March 2000	(Austria) Thomas Hörl	224.5 metres (737 ft)
95	18 March 2000	(Austria) Andreas Goldberger	225 metres (738 ft)
96	20 March 2003	(Poland) Adam Małysz	225 metres (738 ft)
97	20 March 2003	(Finland) Matti Hautamäki	227.5 metres (746 ft)
98	22 March 2003	(Finland) Matti Hautamäki	228.5 metres (750 ft)
99	23 March 2003	(Finland) Matti Hautamäki	231 metres (758 ft)
100	20 March 2005	(Norway) Tommy Ingebrigtsen	231 metres (758 ft)
101	20 March 2005	(Norway) Bjørn Einar Romøren	234.5 metres (769 ft)
102	20 March 2005	(Finland) Matti Hautamäki	235.5 metres (773 ft)
103	20 March 2005	(Norway) Bjørn Einar Romøren	239 metres (784 ft)
110	30 March 2025	(Slovenia) Domen Prevc	254.5 metres (835 ft)

=== Women ===
No.	Date	Athlete	Length
46	27 March 2026	(Slovenia) Nika Prevc	242.5 metres (796 ft)

== Hill parameters ==
Hill specifications according to the International Ski and Snowboard Federation certificate from 2020.

- Construction point: 200 m
- Hill size (HS): 240 m
- Inrun length: 133.8 m
- Inrun angle: 35.1°
- Take-off length: 8 m
- Take-off angle: 11.5°
- Take-off height: 2.93 m
- Landing angle: 33.2°

== In popular culture ==
Letalnica bratov Gorišek appeared as the main location of The Great Ecstasy of Woodcarver Steiner, a German film directed by Werner Herzog which portrayed ski jumper Walter Steiner during the second KOP Ski Flying Week, held at Letalnica in 1974.

== See also ==
- Srednja Bloudkova
- Bloudkova velikanka
- Planica Nordic Centre
