= FIS Nordic World Ski Championships 1991 =

International Nordic skiing competition

- Official logo for the FIS Nordic World Ski Championships 1991.
- Host city: Val di Fiemme
- Country: Italy
- Events: 15
- Opening: 7 February 1991
- Closing: 17 February 1991
- Main venue: Trampolino dal Ben

The FIS Nordic World Ski Championships 1991 took place between 7 and 17 February 1991 in Val di Fiemme, Italy. The women's 5 km was reintroduced after not being held in the previous championships. The men's 10 km was introduced in this championships. Additionally, this was the first championship with a unified German team for the first time officially since 1939 following separate East German and West German teams that had competed from 1958 to 1989.

== Men's cross-country ==
=== 10 km classical ===
11 February 1991

Medal	Athlete	Time
Gold	Terje Langli (NOR)	25:55.0
Silver	Christer Majbäck (SWE)	25:59.7
Bronze	Torgny Mogren (SWE)	26:01.5

=== 15 km freestyle ===
9 February 1991

Medal	Athlete	Time
Gold	Bjørn Dæhlie (NOR)	36:57.2
Silver	Gunde Svan (SWE)	37:05.6
Bronze	Vladimir Smirnov (URS)	37:07.8

=== 30 km classical ===
7 February 1991

Medal	Athlete	Time
Gold	Gunde Svan (SWE)	1:16:12.4
Silver	Vladimir Smirnov (URS)	1:16:17.3
Bronze	Vegard Ulvang (NOR)	1:16:32.8

=== 50 km freestyle ===
17 February 1991

Medal	Athlete	Time
Gold	Torgny Mogren (SWE)	2:03:31.6
Silver	Gunde Svan (SWE)	2:03:48.8
Bronze	Maurilio De Zolt (ITA)	2:04:01.7

=== 4 × 10 km relay ===
15 February 1991

Medal	Team	Time
Gold	Norway (Øyvind Skaanes, Terje Langli, Vegard Ulvang, Bjørn Dæhlie)	1:39:47.3
Silver	Sweden (Thomas Eriksson, Christer Majbäck, Gunde Svan, Torgny Mogren)	1:41:39.1
Bronze	Finland (Mika Kuusisto, Harri Kirvesniemi, Jari Isometsä, Jari Räsänen)	1:42:12.0

== Women's cross-country ==
=== 5 km classical ===
12 February 1991

Medal	Athlete	Time
Gold	Trude Dybendahl (NOR)	14:04.2
Silver	Marja-Liisa Kirvesniemi (FIN)	14:09.9
Bronze	Manuela Di Centa (ITA)	14:24.1

=== 10 km freestyle ===
10 February 1991

Medal	Athlete	Time
Gold	Yelena Välbe (URS)	28:25.9
Silver	Marie-Helene Westin (SWE)	28:59.4
Bronze	Tamara Tikhonova (URS)	29:06.5

=== 15 km classical ===
8 February 1991

Medal	Athlete	Time
Gold	Yelena Välbe (URS)	44:58.5
Silver	Trude Dybendahl (NOR)	46:02.4
Bronze	Stefania Belmondo (ITA)	46:31.4

=== 30 km freestyle ===
16 February 1991

Medal	Athlete	Time
Gold	Lyubov Yegorova (URS)	1:20:26.8
Silver	Yelena Välbe (URS)	1:21:02.4
Bronze	Manuela Di Centa (ITA)	1:21:15.3

Yegorova was the last person to win a gold medal for the Soviet Union before its breakup later that year.

=== 4 × 5 km relay ===
15 February 1991

Medal	Team	Time
Gold	Soviet Union (Lyubov Yegorova, Raisa Smetanina, Tamara Tikhonova, Yelena Välbe)	55:36.6
Silver	Italy (Bice Vanzetta, Manuela Di Centa, Gabriella Paruzzi, Stefania Belmondo)	56:22.5
Bronze	Norway (Solveig Pedersen, Inger Helene Nybråten, Elin Nilsen, Trude Dybendahl)	56:34.5

== Men's Nordic combined ==
=== 15 km individual Gundersen ===
7 February 1991

Medal	Athlete	Time
Gold	Fred Børre Lundberg (NOR)	41.00.6
Silver	Klaus Sulzenbacher (AUT)	+ 1.11.1
Bronze	Klaus Ofner (AUT)	+ 1.11.3

=== 3 × 10 km team ===
13 February 1991

Medal	Team	Time
Gold	Austria (Günther Csar, Klaus Ofner, Klaus Sulzenbacher)	1:21.22.5
Silver	France (Francis Repellin, Xavier Girard, Fabrice Guy)	+ 1.16.4
Bronze	Japan (Reiichi Mikata, Masashi Abe, Kazuoki Kodama)	+ 1.51.9

== Men's ski jumping ==
=== Individual normal hill ===
16 February 1991

Medal	Athlete	Points
Gold	Heinz Kuttin (AUT)	222.9
Silver	Kent Johanssen (NOR)	222.0
Bronze	Ari-Pekka Nikkola (FIN)	219.6

=== Individual large hill ===
10 February 1991

Medal	Athlete	Points	Distance
Gold	Franci Petek (YUG)	217.5	115.5m 117.0m
Silver	Rune Olijnyk (NOR)	216.3	114.0m 118.0m
Bronze	Jens Weißflog (GER)	210.0	116.5m 113.5m

Petek became the only Yugoslavian to medal before the country's plunge into war later that year. Weissflog was the first German to win an individual medal following reunification of East Germany and West Germany and the first to medal since before World War II.

=== Team large hill ===
8 February 1991

Medal	Team	Points
Gold	Austria (Heinz Kuttin, Ernst Vettori, Stefan Horngacher, Andreas Felder)	567.4
Silver	Finland (Ari-Pekka Nikkola, Raimo Ylipulli, Vesa Hakala, Risto Laakkonen)	562.8
Bronze	Germany (Heiko Hunger, André Kiesewetter, Dieter Thoma, Jens Weißflog)	549.4

== Medal table ==
Medal winners by nation.

* Host nation (Italy)

Rank	Nation	Gold	Silver	Bronze	Total
1	Norway (NOR)	5	3	2	10
2	Soviet Union (URS)	4	2	2	8
3	Austria (AUT)	3	1	1	5
4	Sweden (SWE)	2	5	1	8
5	Yugoslavia (YUG)	1	0	0	1
6	Finland (FIN)	0	2	2	4
7	Italy (ITA)*	0	1	4	5
8	France (FRA)	0	1	0	1
9	Germany (GER)	0	0	2	2
10	Japan (JPN)	0	0	1	1
Totals (10 entries)		15	15	15	45
