= Raimo Ylipulli =

Finnish ski jumper

Medal record

Men's ski jumping

Representing Finland

World Championships
Silver medal – second place	1991 Val di Fiemme	Team large hill

Raimo Esko Tapio Ylipulli (born 13 June 1970 in Rovaniemi) is a Finnish former ski jumper who competed from 1986 to 1994. He won a silver medal in the team large hill at the 1991 FIS Nordic World Ski Championships in Val di Fiemme and finished 20th in the individual large hill at those same championships.

Ylipulli's best individual finish at the Winter Olympics was 18th in the individual large hill at Lillehammer in 1994 while his best overall finish was fifth in the team large hill at those same games. His best individual finish was 3rd in a large hill event in Czechoslovakia in 1991.

He is the brother of Nordic combined skier Jukka Ylipulli and fellow ski jumper Tuomo Ylipulli.
