= 1996–97 FIS Ski Flying World Cup =

Ski Flying World Cup 1996/97
Winners
- Overall: (Slovenia) Primož Peterka
- Nations Cup (unofficial): Japan

Competitions
- Venues: 2
- Individual: 4

The 1996/97 FIS Ski Flying World Cup was the 7th official World Cup season in ski flying awarded with small crystal globe as the subdiscipline of FIS Ski Jumping World Cup.

== Map of World Cup hosts ==
(Austria) Bad Mitterndorf	(Slovenia) Planica
Kulm	Velikanka bratov Gorišek
Europe

== World records ==
List of world record distances (both official and invalid) achieved within this World Cup season.

Date	Athlete	Hill	Round	Place	Metres	Feet
22 March 1997	(Norway) Espen Bredesen	Velikanka bratov Gorišek K185	Trial	Planica, Slovenia	210	689
22 March 1997	(Norway) Lasse Ottesen	Velikanka bratov Gorišek K185	Trial	Planica, Slovenia	212	696
22 March 1997	(Germany) Dieter Thoma	Velikanka bratov Gorišek K185	Round 1	Planica, Slovenia	213	699

Longest jump in history at that time, but invalid due to Thoma touched the ground upon landing.

== Calendar ==
=== Men's Individual ===
All	No.	Date	Place (Hill)	Size	Winner	Second	Third	Ski flying leader	R.
399	1	8 February 1997	(Austria) Bad Mitterndorf (Kulm K185)	F _{034}	(Japan) Takanobu Okabe	(Austria) Andreas Goldberger	(Slovenia) Primož Peterka	(Japan) Takanobu Okabe	
400	2	9 February 1997	(Austria) Bad Mitterndorf (Kulm K185)	F _{035}	(Slovenia) Primož Peterka	(Austria) Andreas Goldberger	(Japan) Takanobu Okabe	(Japan) Takanobu Okabe (Slovenia) Primož Peterka	
405	3	22 March 1997	(Slovenia) Planica (Velikanka b. Gorišek K185)	F _{036}	(Japan) Takanobu Okabe	(Japan) Kazuyoshi Funaki	(Finland) Jani Soininen	(Japan) Takanobu Okabe	
406	4	23 March 1997	(Slovenia) Planica (Velikanka b. Gorišek K185)	F _{037}	(Japan) Akira Higashi	(Slovenia) Primož Peterka	(Norway) Lasse Ottesen	(Slovenia) Primož Peterka	
7th FIS Ski Flying Men's Overall (8 February – 23 March 1997)					(Slovenia) Primož Peterka	(Japan) Takanobu Okabe	(Japan) Kazuyoshi Funaki	Ski Flying Overall	

== Standings ==
=== Ski Flying ===
Rank	after 4 events	08/02/1997 Kulm	09/02/1997 Kulm	22/03/1997 Planica	23/03/1997 Planica	Total
	(Slovenia) Primož Peterka	60	100	50	80	290
2	(Japan) Takanobu Okabe	100	60	100	—	260
3	(Japan) Kazuyoshi Funaki	36	40	80	45	201
4	(Norway) Lasse Ottesen	29	45	29	60	163
5	(Austria) Andreas Goldberger	80	80	—	—	160
6	(Japan) Akira Higashi	26	26	1	100	153
7	(Finland) Janne Ahonen	45	50	9	32	136
8	(Finland) Jani Soininen	24	32	60	11	127
9	(Norway) Roar Ljøkelsøy	22	20	32	26	100
10	(Czech Republic) Jaroslav Sakala	—	13	45	40	98
11	(Norway) Espen Bredesen	—	15	26	50	91
12	(Czech Republic) Jakub Sucháček	40	18	16	16	90
13	(Austria) Andreas Widhölzl	20	16	14	36	86
14	(Japan) Hiroya Saitō	13	22	24	22	81
15	(Norway) Tommy Ingebrigtsen	32	36	—	—	68
16	(Norway) Håvard Lie	18	29	18	1	66
17	(Slovenia) Robert Meglič	50	8	—	—	58
	(Germany) Dieter Thoma	—	—	40	18	58
19	(Norway) Kristian Brenden	12	—	22	9	43
20	(Switzerland) Sylvain Freiholz	—	—	15	24	39
21	(Japan) Kazuya Yoshioka	9	14	—	13	36
	(Norway) Henning Stensrud	—	—	36	—	36
23	(Japan) Noriaki Kasai	—	24	11	—	35
24	(Japan) Hideharu Miyahira	15	11	—	8	34
25	(Germany) Hansjörg Jäkle	—	—	12	20	32
26	(France) Nicolas Dessum	—	—	—	29	29
27	(Switzerland) Marco Steinauer	—	—	13	14	27
28	(France) Jérôme Gay	—	—	10	15	25
29	(Finland) Ville Kantee	11	3	8	—	22
30	(Switzerland) Bruno Reuteler	—	—	20	—	20
31	(Norway) Sturle Holseter	—	12	5	—	17
32	(Germany) Ralph Gebstedt	16	—	—	—	16
	(Austria) Stefan Horngacher	—	—	4	12	16
34	(Germany) Rico Meinel	6	9	—	—	15
35	(Poland) Robert Mateja	14	—	—	—	14
	(Slovenia) Samo Gostiša	7	7	—	—	14
37	(Slovenia) Jure Radelj	10	2	—	—	12
38	(Italy) Roberto Cecon	1	—	—	10	11
39	(Finland) Mika Laitinen	—	10	—	—	10
40	(Germany) Olaf Hegenbarth	5	4	—	—	9
41	(Czech Republic) Roman Křenek	8	—	—	—	8
	(Finland) Jussi Hautamäki	—	—	3	5	8
43	(Austria) Martin Höllwarth	—	—	7	—	7
	(Finland) Pasi Kytösaho	—	—	—	7	7
45	(Finland) Risto Jussilainen	—	6	—	—	6
	(Norway) Simen Berntsen	—	—	6	—	6
	(Slovenia) Urban Franc	—	—	—	6	6
48	(Poland) Adam Małysz	—	5	—	—	5
49	(Austria) Werner Rathmayr	4	—	—	—	4
	(Norway) Christian Meyer	3	1	—	—	4
	(France) Didier Mollard	—	—	—	4	4
52	(Slovenia) Matija Stegnar	—	—	—	3	3
53	(Czech Republic) Jakub Jiroutek	2	—	—	—	2
	(Austria) Adolf Grugger	—	—	2	—	2
	(France) Lucas Chevalier-Girod	—	—	—	2	2

=== Nations Cup (unofficial) ===
Rank	after 4 events	Points
1	Japan	800
2	Norway	594
3	Slovenia	383
4	Finland	316
5	Austria	275
6	Czech Republic	198
7	Germany	130
8	Switzerland	86
9	France	60
10	Poland	19
11	Italy	11
