= Nordic Tournament 1997 =

The 1997 Nordic Tournament was the first edition and took place in Lahti, Kuopio, Falun and Oslo between 9–16 March 1997.

== Results ==
Date	Place	Hill	Size	Winner	Second	Third	Ref.
9 Mar 1997	(Finland) Lahti	Salpausselkä K-114	LH	(Austria) Andreas Widhölzl	(Finland) Pasi Kytösaho	(Finland) Jani Soininen (Japan) Kazuyoshi Funaki	
12 Mar 1997	(Finland) Kuopio	Puijo K-90	NH	(Japan) Kazuyoshi Funaki	(France) Nicolas Dessum	(Slovenia) Primož Peterka	
13 Mar 1997	(Sweden) Falun	Lugnet K-115	LH	(Slovenia) Primož Peterka	(Germany) Dieter Thoma	(Japan) Hiroya Saito	
16 Mar 1997	(Norway) Oslo	Holmenkollbakken K-112	LH	(Japan) Kazuyoshi Funaki	(Japan) Hiroya Saito	(Switzerland) Bruno Reuteler	

== Overall ==
Pos	Ski Jumper	Points
1	(Japan) Kazuyoshi Funaki	785.6
2	(Norway) Kristian Brenden	757.6
3	(Austria) Andreas Widhölzl	738.9
4	(Finland) Janne Ahonen	737.0
5	(Poland) Adam Małysz	701.8
6	(Slovenia) Primož Peterka	683.5
7	(Switzerland) Bruno Reuteler	682.3
8	(Norway) Håvard Lie	669.6
9	(Norway) Simen Berntsen	656.3
10	(Germany) Dieter Thoma	647.9
