= 1997–98 FIS Ski Jumping World Cup – Zakopane =

World Cup ski jumping event held in Zakopane, Poland

The 1998 Zakopane Ski Jumping World Cup was a series of ski jumping competitions held as part of the 1997–98 FIS Ski Jumping World Cup from 16 to 18 January 1998 at Wielka Krokiew in Zakopane, Poland.

Two individual competitions were contested on the large hill. This marked the fourth time that ski jumpers competed in Zakopane for World Cup points. These were the 13th and 14th competitions of the 1997/1998 World Cup season.

In the first competition at Wielka Krokiew, Kristian Brenden emerged victorious. In the second, Primož Peterka proved to be the best athlete. For the representative of Slovenia, this was his second career World Cup win in Zakopane.

Second places were secured by Janne Ahonen (first competition) and Kazuyoshi Funaki (second competition). Sven Hannawald took third place in both events.

This was the second time, after the 1996 event, that two individual large hill competitions were held in Zakopane as part of the Ski Jumping World Cup in Zakopane. In 1980, one competition was held on the normal hill and one on the large hill, while in 1990, a single competition took place on the large hill.

A total of 82 athletes from 16 national teams were registered for the competitions. The oldest participant was Japan's Masahiko Harada (29 years and 252 days), while the youngest was Poland's Grzegorz Śliwka (15 years and 272 days).

== Pre-event context ==
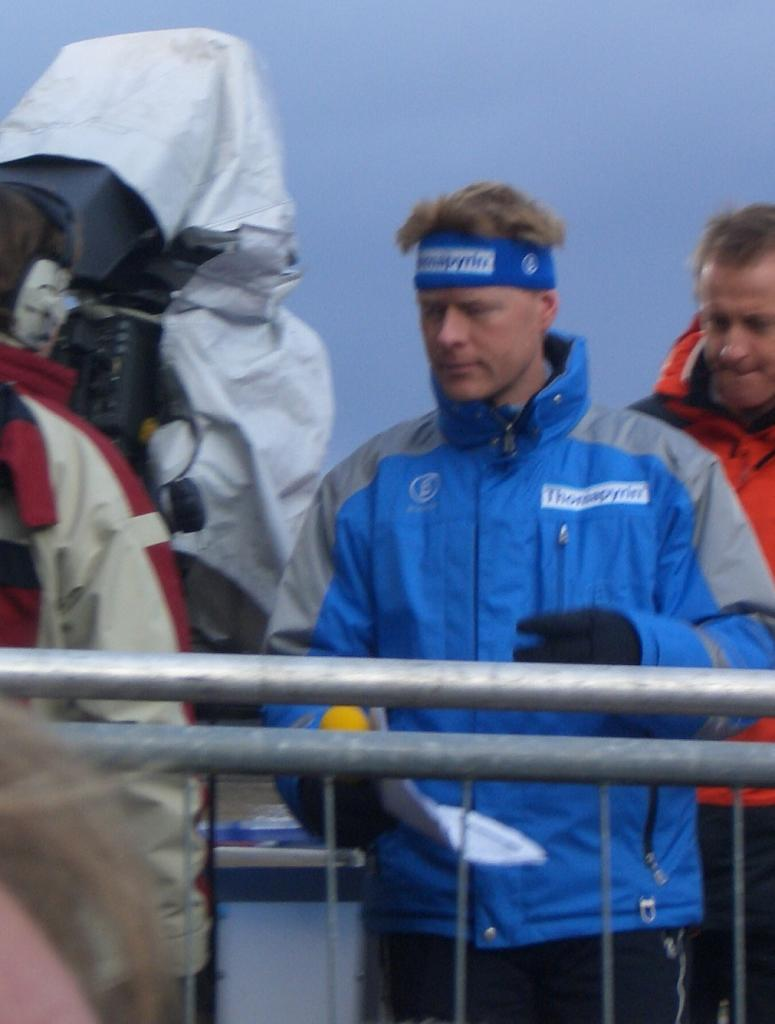
Dieter Thoma – runner-up in the World Cup standings before the Zakopane competitions

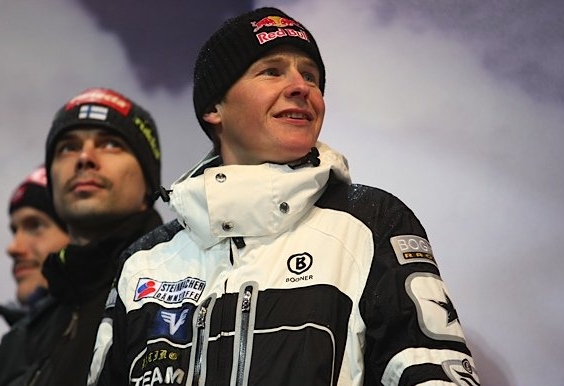
Andreas Goldberger – winner of the 1996 Zakopane World Cup competition

Before the Zakopane events, 12 individual competitions had been held in the 1997/1998 World Cup season. The World Cup standings were led by Masahiko Harada with 729 points, 111 points ahead of second-placed Dieter Thoma. Kazuyoshi Funaki held third place with 584 points. In the Nations Cup, Japan led, followed by Germany and Finland, tied for second place.

Prior to Zakopane, World Cup victories in the season were claimed by: Masahiko Harada (four times), Kazuyoshi Funaki (three times), Jani Soininen (twice), and Sven Hannawald, Dieter Thoma, and Andreas Widhölzl (once each).

From 29 December 1997 to 6 January 1998, the 46th Four Hills Tournament was held. It was won by Kazuyoshi Funaki, who triumphed in the first three competitions in Oberstdorf, Garmisch-Partenkirchen, and Innsbruck. Funaki had the chance to become the first ski jumper to win all four competitions in a single Four Hills Tournament edition, but he finished eighth in the final competition in Bischofshofen, where Sven Hannawald took the victory. The top three in the 46th Four Hills Tournament were Kazuyoshi Funaki, Sven Hannawald, and Janne Ahonen.

In the last World Cup competitions before Zakopane, held in Ramsau on 11 January, Japanese athletes dominated. Masahiko Harada won, followed by Kazuyoshi Funaki and Hiroya Saitō. Andreas Widhölzl placed fourth, while Yoshikazu Norota and Kenji Suda tied for fifth. Notably, Janne Ahonen, Hansjörg Jäkle, Sven Hannawald, Primož Peterka, and Jaroslav Sakala – all from the top 15 in the World Cup standings – did not compete in Ramsau.

=== World Cup standings before Zakopane ===
World Cup standings before Zakopane competitions
Rank	Athlete	Country	Points	Deficit to leader
1.	Masahiko Harada	Japan	729	–
2.	Dieter Thoma	Germany	618	111
3.	Kazuyoshi Funaki	Japan	584	145
4.	Jani Soininen	Finland	557	172
5.	Andreas Widhölzl	Austria	451	278
6.	Primož Peterka	Slovenia	433	296
7.	Hiroya Saitō	Japan	414	315
8.	Janne Ahonen	Finland	373	356
9.	Sven Hannawald	Germany	328	401
10.	Stefan Horngacher	Austria	316	403
11.	Noriaki Kasai	Japan	305	424
12.	Hansjörg Jäkle	Germany	241	488
13.	Jaroslav Sakala	Czech Republic	228	501
14.	Andreas Goldberger	Austria	218	511
15.	Martin Höllwarth	Austria	211	518
16.	Kimmo Savolainen	Finland	190	539
17.	Henning Stensrud	Norway	178	551
18.	Michael Wagner	Germany	176	553
19.	Kazuya Yoshioka	Japan	167	562
20.	Mika Laitinen	Finland	164	565
21.	Ari-Pekka Nikkola	Finland	154	575
22.	Reinhard Schwarzenberger	Austria	147	582
23.	Sylvain Freiholz	Switzerland	88	641
23.	Wolfgang Loitzl	Austria	88	641
25.	Jon Petter Sandaker	Norway	87	642
26.	Kenji Suda	Japan	78	651
27.	Takanobu Okabe	Japan	76	653
28.	Kristian Brenden	Norway	67	662
29.	Martin Schmitt	Germany	65	664
30.	Michal Doležal	Czech Republic	64	665
31.	Ronny Hornschuh	Germany	62	667
32.	Yoshikazu Norota	Japan	60	669
33.	Roar Ljøkelsøy	Norway	54	675
34.	Valery Kobelev	Russia	50	679
35.	Nicolas Dessum	France	46	683
36.	Matthias Wallner	Austria	44	685
37.	Matti Hautamäki	Finland	43	686
38.	Hideharu Miyahira	Japan	41	688
39.	Lasse Ottesen	Norway	40	689
40.	František Jež	Czech Republic	38	691
40.	Tommy Ingebrigtsen	Norway	38	691
42.	Adam Małysz	Poland	33	696
42.	Espen Bredesen	Norway	33	696
44.	Robert Mateja	Poland	32	697
45.	Robert Křenek	Czech Republic	28	701
46.	Bruno Reuteler	Switzerland	26	703
47.	Roberto Cecon	Italy	25	704
47.	Peter Žonta	Slovenia	25	704
49.	Jussi Hautamäki	Finland	23	706
50.	Jérôme Gay	France	20	709
51.	Gerd Siegmund	Germany	16	713
51.	Simon Ammann	Switzerland	16	713
53.	Wojciech Skupień	Poland	15	714
54.	Urban Franc	Slovenia	13	716
55.	Jakub Janda	Czech Republic	12	717
56.	Miha Rihtar	Slovenia	10	719
56.	Håvard Lie	Norway	10	719
58.	Morten Ågheim	Norway	9	720
59.	Ville Kantee	Finland	8	721
60.	Choi Heung-chul	South Korea	6	723
61.	Sturle Holseter	Norway	4	725
61.	Michael Kury	Austria	4	725
61.	Christof Duffner	Germany	4	725
64.	Randy Weber	United States	3	726
64.	Lucas Chevalier-Girod	France	3	726
66.	Ralf Gebstedt	Germany	2	727
66.	Aleksey Shibko	Belarus	2	727

=== Event organization ===
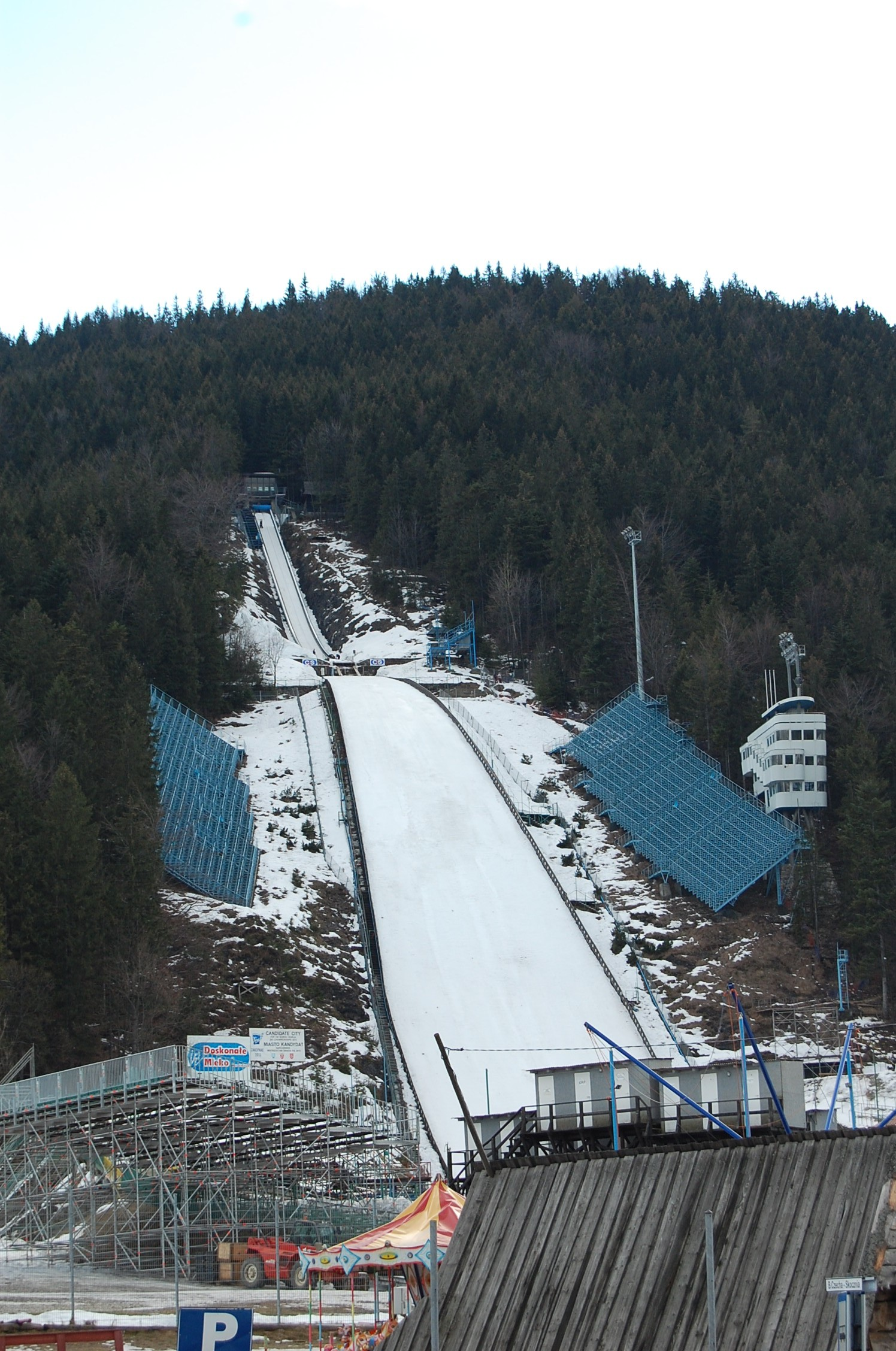
Wielka Krokiew in Zakopane

The organizers prepared 40,000 ticketed seats in the stands for both competitions. Tickets were sold at prices of 2 PLN (concession) and 5 PLN (standard).

A lack of sufficient snow posed challenges for the organizers. However, sub-zero temperatures allowed the use of snow cannons, and snow was also transported from the Morskie Oko area.

In addition to the World Cup events, a ceremony for the Olympic oath of Polish ski jumping representatives for the 1998 Winter Olympics in Nagano was planned in Zakopane. The ceremony took place on 17 January, following the first competition. The oath was taken by Krystian Długopolski, Łukasz Kruczek, Adam Małysz, Robert Mateja, and Wojciech Skupień.

=== Event schedule ===
The first official training session took place on 16 January 1998, with the second individual competition concluding the event two days later. The schedule included two individual competitions, two qualifying rounds, and three official training sessions.

Date	Time	Event
16 January 1998	1:00 PM	Official training on K-116 hill (3 series)
17 January 1998	10:00 AM	Qualifying round for the individual competition on K-116 hill
17 January 1998	1:00 PM	Start of the first round of the individual competition on K-116 hill, second round of the individual competition
18 January 1998	10:00 AM	Qualifying round for the individual competition on K-116 hill
18 January 1998	1:00 PM	Start of the first round of the individual competition on K-116 hill, second round of the individual competition

== Venue ==
The 1998 Zakopane World Cup competitions were held at Wielka Krokiew named after Stanisław Marusarz, located on the northern slope of Krokiew in the Western Tatras. Two individual competitions took place at the venue. Wielka Krokiew had previously hosted World Cup events in 1980, 1990, and 1996, with competitions planned for 1981 but canceled.

Venue	Location	K-point	Venue record		
Wielka Krokiew	(Poland) Zakopane	K-116	130.0 m	(Slovenia) Primož Peterka	27 January 1996

== Competition overview ==
=== Training sessions (16 January 1998) ===
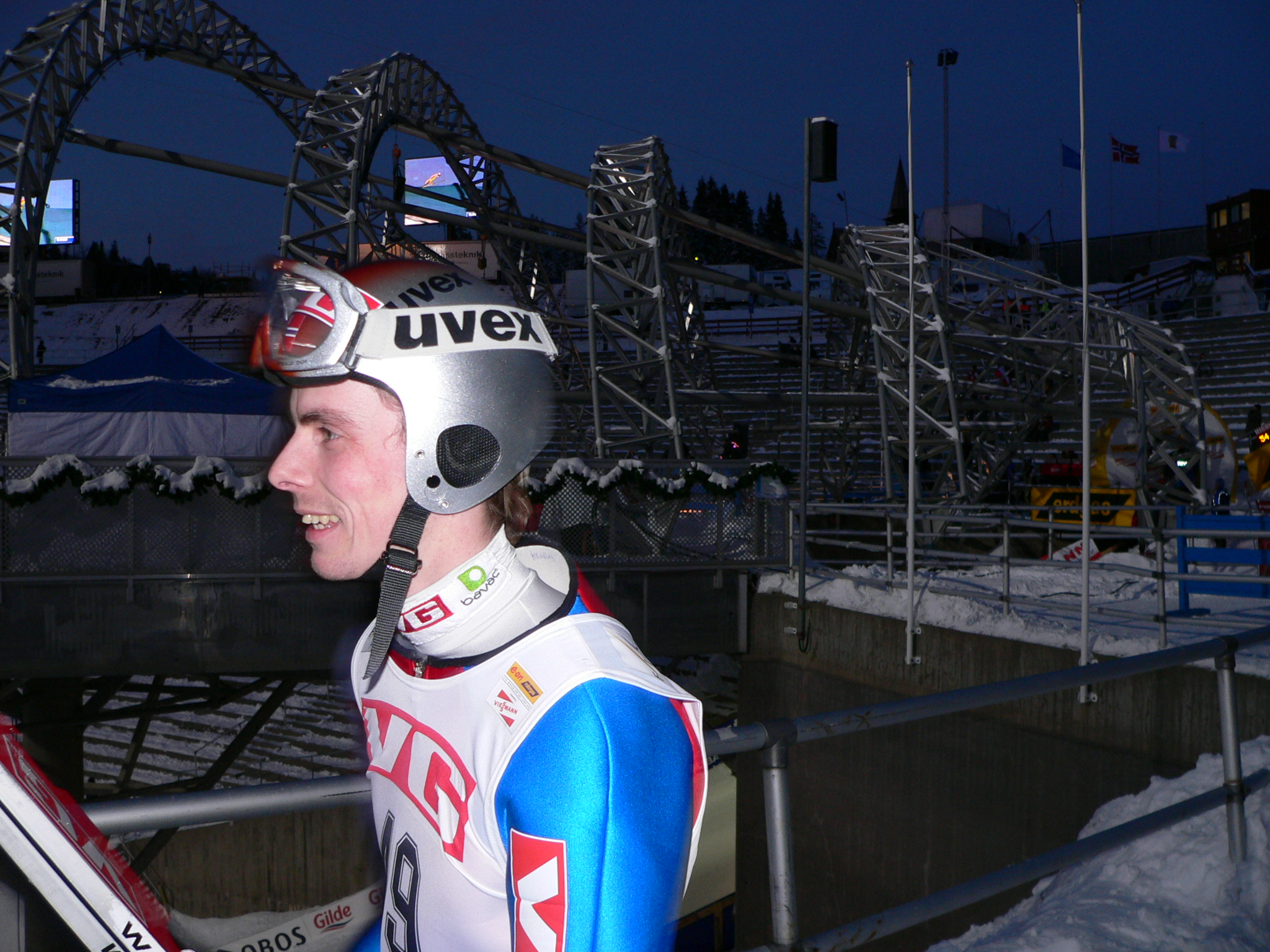
Henning Stensrud – leader after the first round of the first Zakopane competition

The first training session began on Friday, 16 January, at 1:00 PM. It was repeatedly interrupted due to the foehn wind. The starting gate was lowered three times. Ultimately, after 68 jumpers completed their attempts, the training was canceled, and the remaining sessions were not held. Among those who jumped, Henning Stensrud achieved the longest distance of 129 m. Toni Nieminen jumped 112 m, and Wojciech Skupień reached 110.5 m. The session was canceled before Andreas Goldberger could attempt his jump. Earlier, Dieter Thoma had withdrawn from the training.

=== Qualification for the first individual competition (17 January 1998) ===
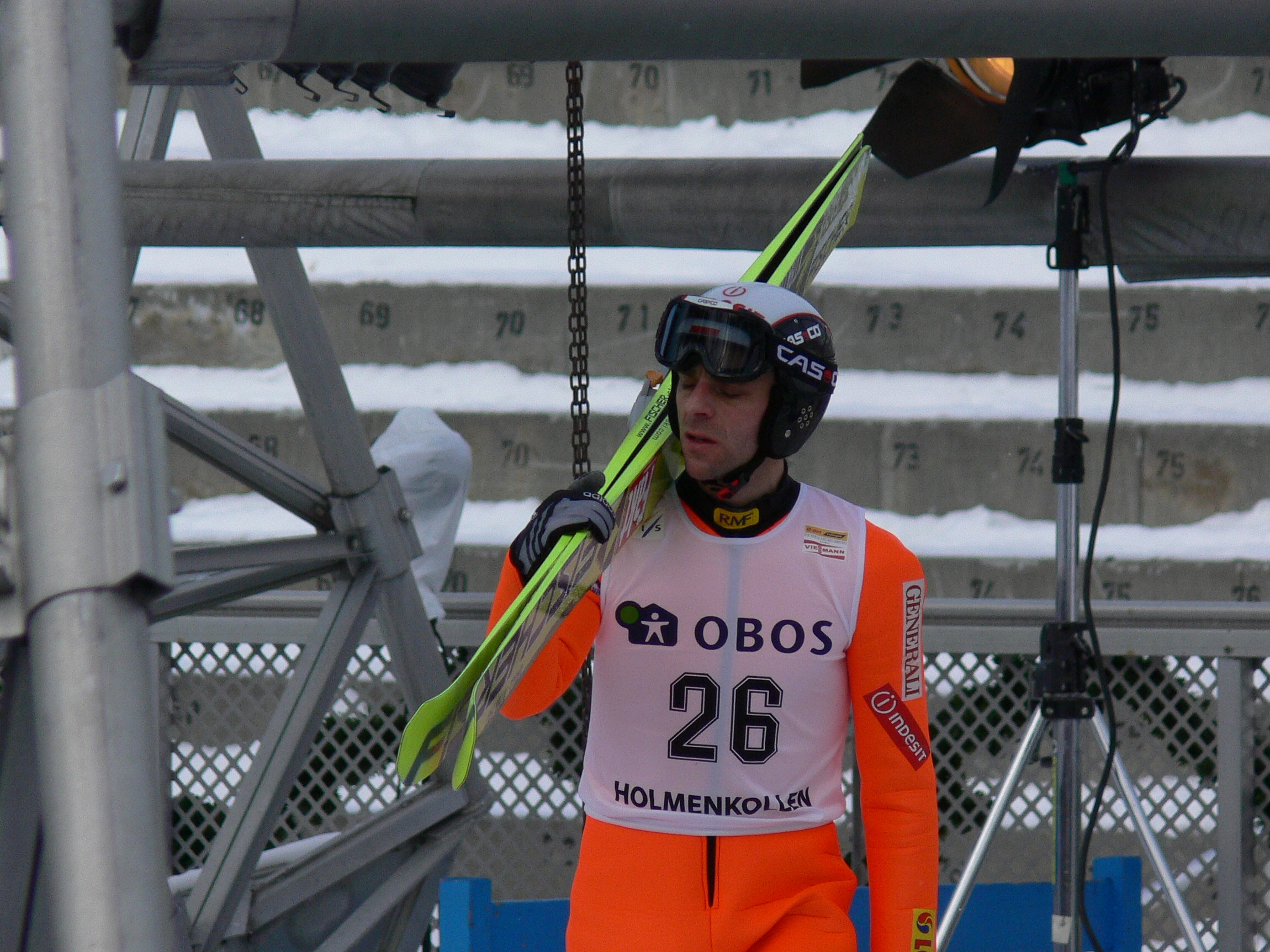
Robert Mateja – sixth in the first Zakopane competition

The qualifying round began on 17 January 1998 at 10:00 AM, as the wind subsided. The qualification took place in favorable weather conditions and was won by Kazuyoshi Funaki, who jumped 119 m. The World Cup runner-up, Dieter Thoma, landed 2.5 m farther but received 5 points lower for style, losing to Funaki by 0.5 points. Third was Martin Schmitt, the best among those fighting for qualification, also jumping 119 m. Fourth was Kristian Brenden, who jumped 120.5 m, making him, alongside Thoma, the only jumper to exceed 120 m.

A total of 80 athletes from 16 countries participated in the qualifications.

=== First individual competition (17 January 1998) ===
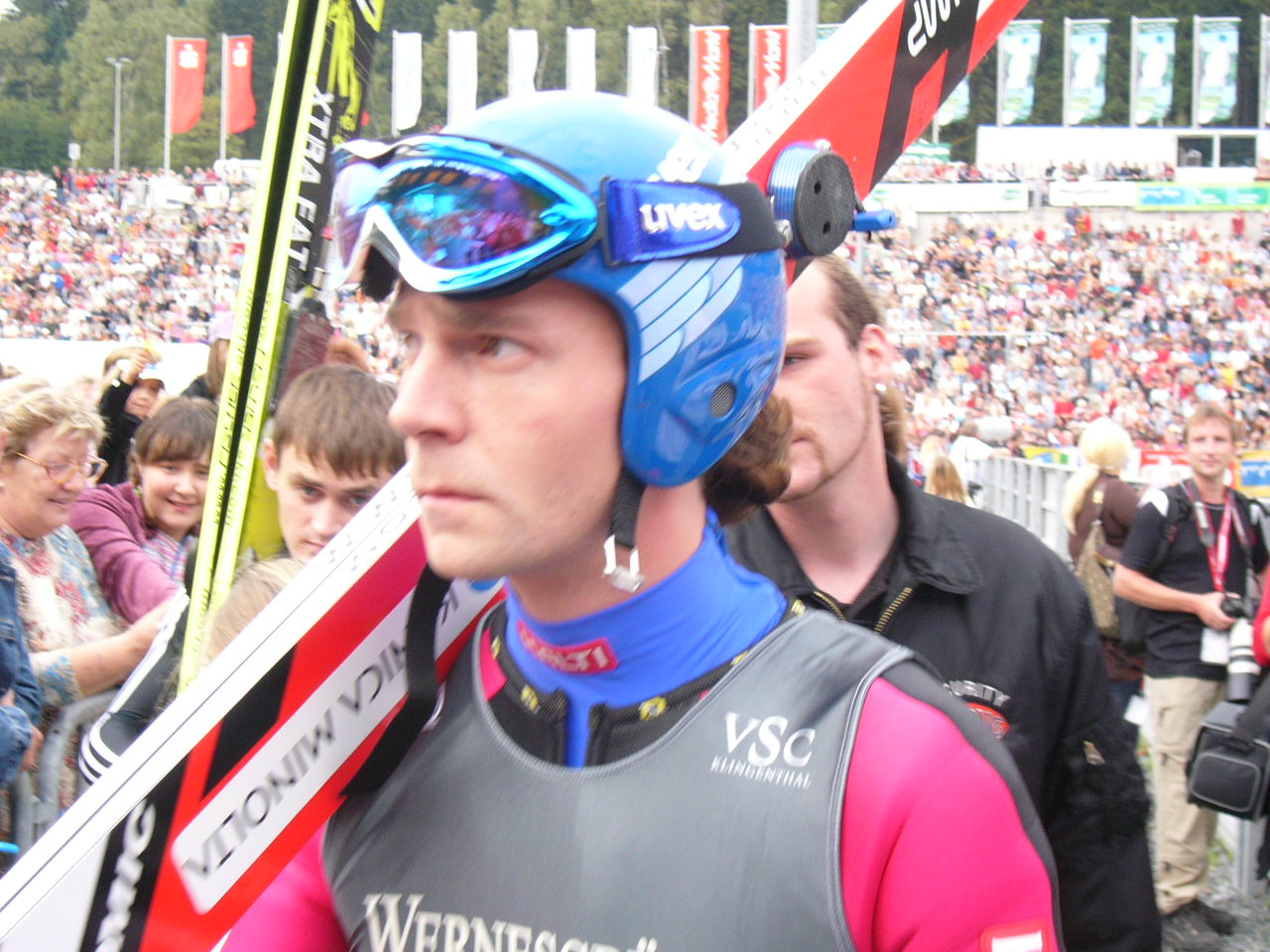
Janne Ahonen – second place in the first competition

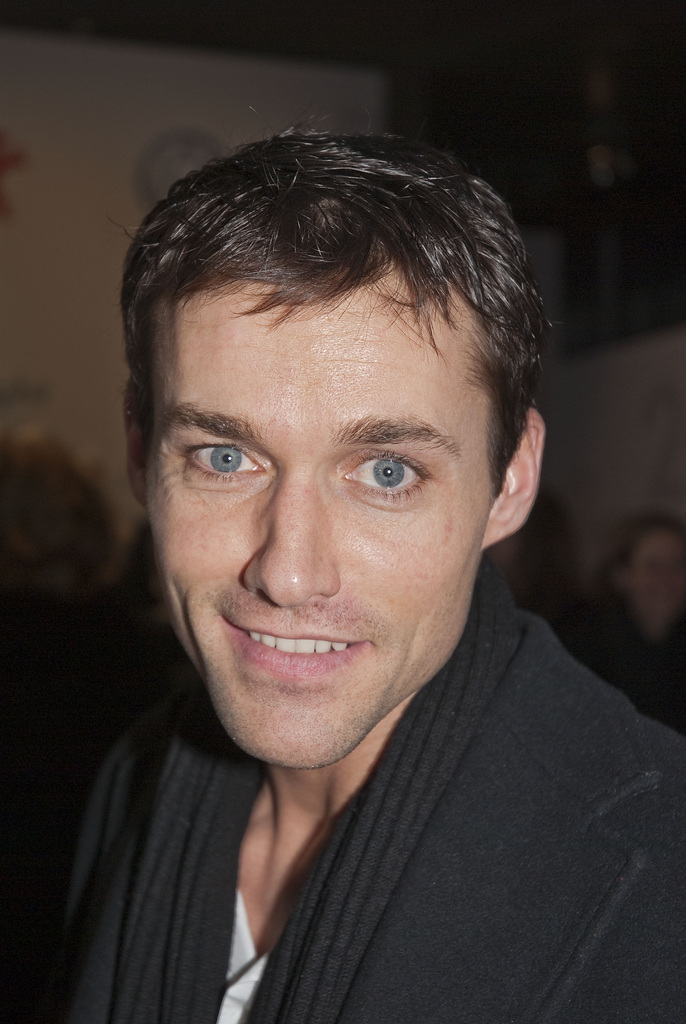
Sven Hannawald – third place in both Zakopane competitions

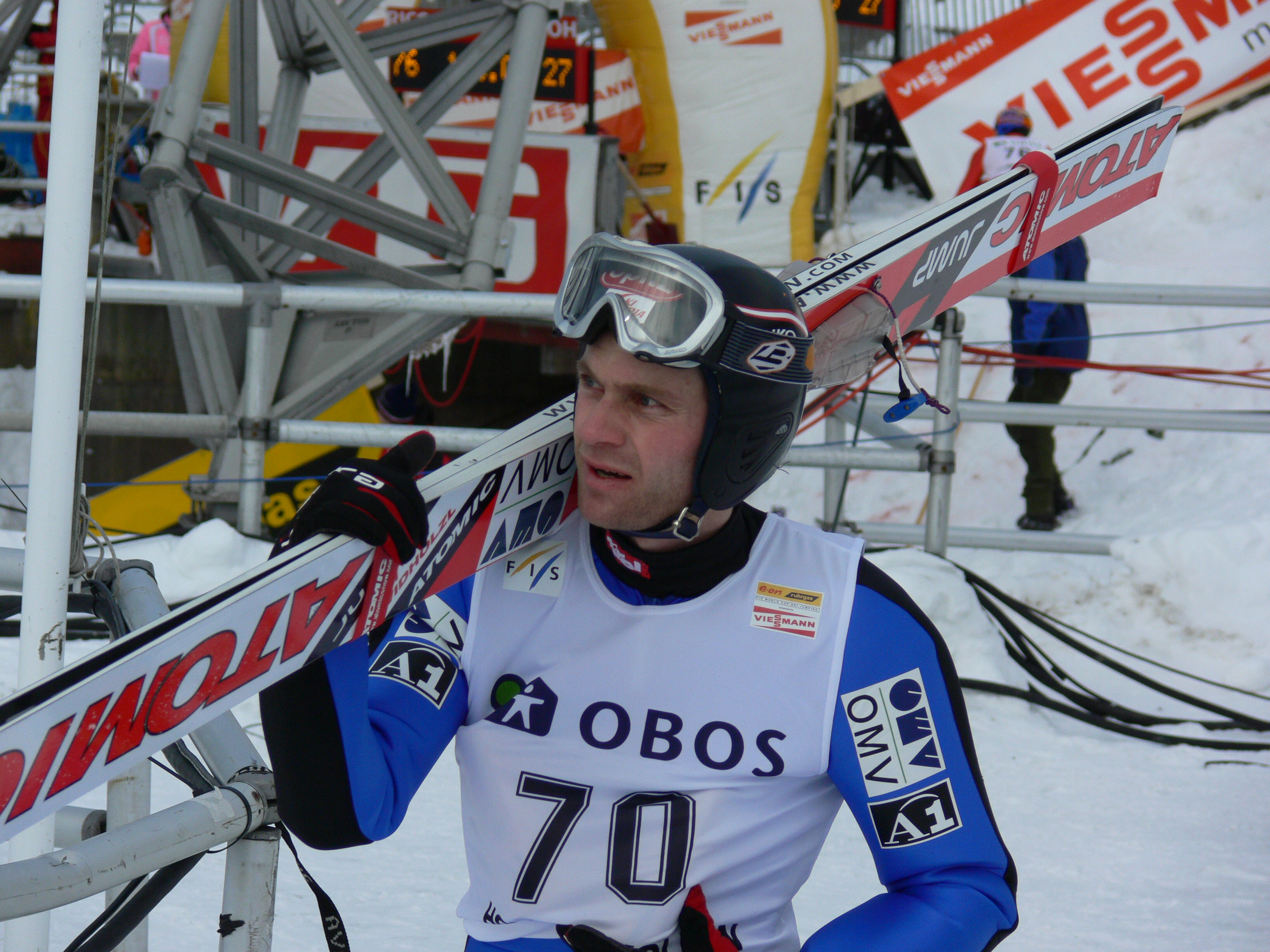
Andreas Widhölzl – fourth in the first competition

The first individual competition began on 17 January at 1:00 PM. Thirty minutes before the start, light rain began to fall. The competition opened with Switzerland's Marco Steinauer, who jumped 95 m. The next jumper, Roland Wakolm, landed 6 m farther, taking the lead. The fifth jumper, Roland Audenrieth, jumped 105.5 m and assumed the lead. He held it despite attempts by others, including Wojciech Skupień, who jumped 99.5 m and was third. As the competition progressed, rain intensified, worsening conditions on the takeoff.

Audenrieth remained in the lead until the 20th jumper, Robert Mateja, who jumped 106.5 m, surpassing him by 7.3 points. Adam Małysz, jumping next, landed at 94.5 m, placing lower. Kristian Brenden jumped 99 m, taking fifth place. Increasing rain led to shorter jumps by subsequent competitors. The 35th jumper, Henning Stensrud, landed at 109 m, becoming the new leader. The 1996 Zakopane World Cup winner, Andreas Goldberger, managed only 88.5 m.

Before the top 10 World Cup athletes jumped, hail began to fall. The final 10 started with Stefan Horngacher at 83 m. Sven Hannawald and Janne Ahonen jumped 97 m and 98 m, respectively, placing in the top ranks. Hiroya Saitō reached 95.5 m, while defending World Cup champion Primož Peterka and Andreas Widhölzl both hit 94 m. Finland's Jani Soininen jumped 89 m, Four Hills Tournament winner Kazuyoshi Funaki 87 m, Dieter Thoma 86.5 m, and World Cup leader Masahiko Harada 96.5 m. Thoma, Funaki, Soininen, Horngacher, and Goldberger failed to advance to the final round. After the first round, Henning Stensrud led, followed by Robert Mateja, Roland Audenrieth, Roland Wakolm, Wojciech Skupień, and Kristian Brenden.

Before the final round, the hail turned to sleet, and the jury extended the takeoff by two meters. The second round began with Kazuya Yoshioka jumping 88.5 m. The lead changed after Hansjörg Jäkle jumped 97 m. Jäkle held the lead until Reinhard Schwarzenberger, 26th after the first round (93 m), jumped 105.5 m, taking an 18.2-point lead. Primož Peterka jumped 97 m, taking second. The lead changed again with Martin Schmitt, who matched Schwarzenberger's distance but led by 2.3 points. Poland's Adam Małysz, 21st after the first round, jumped 92.5 m, placing seventh. Schmitt was overtaken by Andreas Widhölzl, 18th after the first round, who jumped 107 m.

The final 10 opened with Masahiko Harada, who jumped 104 m, placing just behind Widhölzl. Sven Hannawald jumped 108 m, taking the lead. Lasse Ottesen, eighth after the first round, landed at 89 m, losing his top position. Janne Ahonen jumped 107 m, taking the lead by 0.5 points over Kristian Brenden, who also jumped 106 m. Wojciech Skupień, fifth after the first round, jumped 88 m, dropping to the lower ranks. Roland Wakolm jumped 91 m, also falling out of the top 10. Roland Audenrieth, third after the first round, jumped 93.5 m, finishing ninth. Robert Mateja matched Audenrieth's 93.5 m, securing sixth place. First-round leader Henning Stensrud jumped 87.5 m, finishing 13th.

Thus, the first individual World Cup competition in Zakopane in 1998 was won by Kristian Brenden, the first Norwayn to win a World Cup event at Wielka Krokiew. This was Brenden's second career World Cup victory. Janne Ahonen and Sven Hannawald took the remaining podium places. Fifty athletes from 13 countries competed in the event.

=== Qualification for the second individual competition (18 January 1998) ===
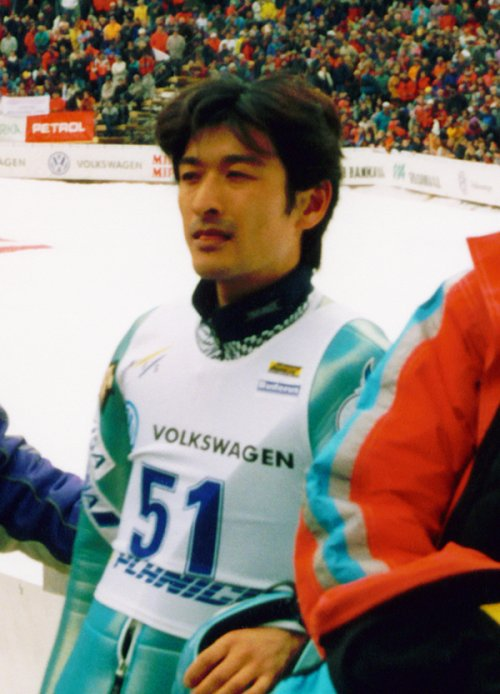
Hiroya Saitō – fourth in the second competition

On Sunday, 18 January, at 10:00 AM, the qualifying round for the second individual competition in Zakopane began. It concluded with a victory for Sven Hannawald, who jumped 114 m, defeating his compatriot Hansjörg Jäkle (112.5 m) by 3.2 points. Third was Kristian Brenden, the previous day's winner, who jumped 112 m and was the best among those competing for qualification. Unlike Saturday's event, the competition took place in sunny, windless conditions.

Short jumps in the qualifying round were recorded by Primož Peterka (79 m), Dieter Thoma (67 m), and Andreas Widhölzl (61 m), who placed 73rd, 78th, and 79th, respectively. However, their positions in the top 15 of the World Cup standings guaranteed their participation in the main event.

Eighty athletes from 16 countries participated in the qualifications.

=== Second individual competition (18 January 1998) ===
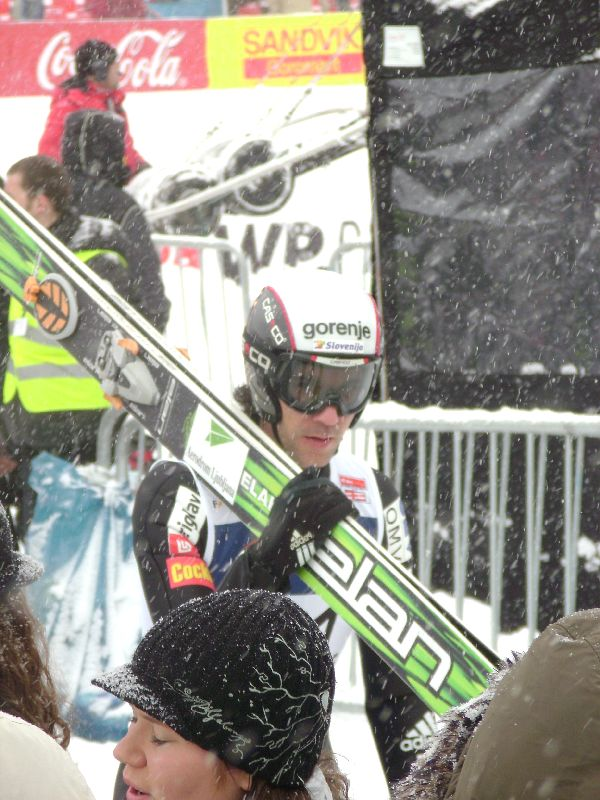
Primož Peterka – winner of the second Zakopane competition

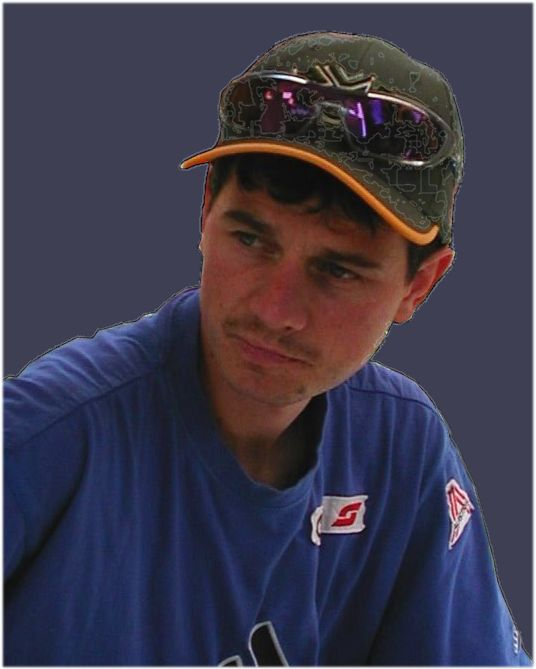
Stefan Horngacher – ninth in the second competition

The second individual competition at Wielka Krokiew began on 18 January at 1:00 PM. The event opened with Andrzej Młynarczyk, who jumped 89 m. Łukasz Kruczek, jumping next, landed 6.5 m farther. The third jumper, Ján Zelenčík, reached 107 m, surpassing the Polish athletes. Andrey Lyskovets matched Zelenčík's distance but took the lead with higher style points. Łyskawiec held the lead until the 11th jumper, Wojciech Skupień, who landed at 108 m. The 12th jumper, Christof Duffner, jumped 109 m, overtaking Skupień. The 18th jumper, František Jež, took the lead with a 113 m jump.

The 20th jumper, Poland's Adam Małysz, landed at 107 m, placing fifth, tied with Łyskawiec. The 23rd jumper, Roar Ljøkelsøy, matched Jež's 113 m, sharing the lead. The 25th jumper, Poland's Robert Mateja, jumped 111.5 m, taking third behind Jež and Ljøkelsøy. The lead changed with the 27th jumper, Jon Petter Sandaker, who jumped 114.5 m, leading by 1.7 points.

The next Norwayn, Kristian Brenden, jumped 115.5 m, just shy of the K-point, taking the lead. The 37th jumper, Andreas Goldberger, jumped 116 m, overtaking Brenden. The 40th jumper, Hansjörg Jäkle, reached 124 m but was surpassed by Sven Hannawald, who jumped 120.5 m and took the lead with better style points. Hiroya Saitō, jumping next, landed at 121 m with even higher style points, leading Hannawald by 0.1 points.

Saitō's lead lasted until Primož Peterka jumped 124 m, taking a 6.5-point lead. Peterka held the lead against Janne Ahonen (117.5 m), Andreas Widhölzl (119 m), Jani Soininen (117 m), Kazuyoshi Funaki (121.5 m), and Dieter Thoma (121.5 m). The final jumper, World Cup leader Masahiko Harada, jumped 102 m, finishing 37th and missing the final round. At the halfway point, Peterka led, followed by Funaki and Saitō.

The second round began with Martin Schmitt, 30th after the first round, jumping 83 m. Andrey Lyskovets, jumping next, landed 15.5 m farther, taking the lead. Adam Małysz, tied for 28th, jumped 91.5 m, placing second.

Wojciech Skupień jumped 102.5 m, taking the lead, but was overtaken by Reinhard Schwarzenberger (106.5 m). The lead changed again with Kimmo Savolainen (107 m) and Christof Duffner (109 m). Lasse Ottesen then jumped 109 m, taking the lead. The next three jumpers – Kazuya Yoshioka (108 m), Gerd Siegmund (110 m), and Martin Höllwarth (110.5 m) – each took the lead.

Robert Mateja, 17th after the first round, jumped 103.5 m, dropping to seventh. Ari-Pekka Nikkola, tied with Mateja, jumped 110.5 m, leading Höllwarth by 2.9 points. František Jež jumped 108 m, taking third. Roar Ljøkelsøy jumped 109 m, maintaining a top position. Jon Petter Sandaker jumped 107 m, falling to ninth. Kristian Brenden jumped 108.5 m, securing a top-10 finish. Stefan Horngacher, 13th after the first round, jumped 111.5 m, taking the lead.

In the final round, Andreas Widhölzl jumped 85 meters, which caused him to fall to the third ten of the standings, ahead of only two competitors – Małysz and Schmitt. Dieter Thoma, however, overtook the leading Finns by landing at 124 meters in the second round. Hansjörg Jäkle reached a result seven meters shorter and, after his jump, held fourth place behind Thoma, Ahonen, and Soininen. Fourth after the first round, Sven Hannawald executed the longest jump of both competition rounds with 128.5 meters, thereby taking the lead in the event, 11.6 points ahead of Thoma. Next on the start gate was Hiroya Saitō, who landed 3.5 meters shorter than the German before him, placing him in second position. The second-ranked athlete after the first round, Kazuyoshi Funaki, jumped 128 meters and edged out the current leader, Hannawald, by 0.1 points.

Only one jumper remained at the start – Primož Peterka. The Slovenian jumped 127 meters, which was enough to win a World Cup competition for the 10th time in his career and the first time that season. He also became the first ski jumper in history to win twice in a World Cup event held in Zakopane. Just behind Peterka were Funaki and Hannawald. The best of the Polish competitors was Robert Mateja, who placed 23rd.

Fifty athletes from 14 countries competed in the event.

== World Cup standings after the Zakopane competitions ==
Following the events in Zakopane, several changes occurred among the top competitors in the World Cup standings. Kazuyoshi Funaki moved up to second place, overtaking Dieter Thoma. Primož Peterka advanced from sixth to fifth position, ahead of Andreas Widhölzl. Janne Ahonen climbed from eighth to seventh, pushing Hiroya Saitō down one spot. Jaroslav Sakala dropped from 13th to 15th place, giving way to Martin Höllwarth (up from 15th to 13th) and Andreas Goldberger (who remained in 14th). There were no changes in the lineup of athletes within the top 15 of the overall World Cup classification.

In the Nations Cup standings, Japan remained in first place. Germany held on to second position, while Finland dropped to third.

World Cup standings after Zakopane competitions
Rank	Athlete	Country	Points	Deficit to leader
1.	Masahiko Harada	Japan	774	–
2.	Kazuyoshi Funaki	Japan	664	110
3.	Dieter Thoma	Germany	663	111
4.	Jani Soininen	Finland	597	177
5.	Primož Peterka	Slovenia	547	227
6.	Andreas Widhölzl	Austria	504	270
7.	Janne Ahonen	Finland	493	281
8.	Hiroya Saitō	Japan	474	300
9.	Sven Hannawald	Germany	448	326
10.	Stefan Horngacher	Austria	355	419
11.	Noriaki Kasai	Japan	305	469
12.	Hansjörg Jäkle	Germany	286	488
13.	Martin Höllwarth	Austria	262	512
14.	Andreas Goldberger	Austria	240	534
15.	Jaroslav Sakala	Czech Republic	239	535
16.	Kimmo Savolainen	Finland	199	575
17.	Henning Stensrud	Norway	198	576
18.	Kristian Brenden	Norway	193	581
19.	Reinhard Schwarzenberger	Austria	182	592
20.	Ari-Pekka Nikkola	Finland	181	593
21.	Kazuya Yoshioka	Japan	180	594
22.	Michael Wagner	Germany	176	598
23.	Mika Laitinen	Finland	164	610
24.	Sylvain Freiholz	Switzerland	116	658
25.	Jon Petter Sandaker	Norway	100	674
26.	Martin Schmitt	Germany	98	676
27.	Wolfgang Loitzl	Austria	95	679
28.	Ronny Hornschuh	Germany	86	688
29.	Robert Mateja	Poland	80	694
30.	Roar Ljøkelsøy	Norway	78	696
30.	Kenji Suda	Japan	78	696
32.	Takanobu Okabe	Japan	76	698
33.	Michal Doležal	Czech Republic	64	710
34.	Yoshikazu Norota	Japan	60	714
34.	Lasse Ottesen	Norway	60	714
36.	František Jež	Czech Republic	56	718
37.	Gerd Siegmund	Germany	52	722
38.	Valery Kobelev	Russia	50	724
39.	Nicolas Dessum	France	46	728
40.	Matthias Wallner	Austria	44	730
41.	Adam Małysz	Poland	43	731
41.	Matti Hautamäki	Finland	43	731
43.	Hideharu Miyahira	Japan	41	733
44.	Tommy Ingebrigtsen	Norway	38	736
45.	Robert Křenek	Czech Republic	33	741
45.	Espen Bredesen	Norway	33	741
47.	Roberto Cecon	Italy	31	743
48.	Christof Duffner	Germany	30	744
48.	Bruno Reuteler	Switzerland	30	744
50.	Roland Audenrieth	Germany	26	748
51.	Peter Žonta	Slovenia	25	749
52.	Wojciech Skupień	Poland	23	751
52.	Jussi Hautamäki	Finland	23	751
54.	Sturle Holseter	Norway	22	752
55.	Jérôme Gay	France	20	754
56.	Simon Ammann	Switzerland	16	758
57.	Roland Wakolm	Austria	15	759
58.	Urban Franc	Slovenia	13	761
59.	Jakub Janda	Czech Republic	12	762
60.	Miha Rihtar	Slovenia	10	764
60.	Håvard Lie	Norway	10	764
62.	Morten Ågheim	Norway	9	765
63.	Ville Kantee	Finland	8	766
64.	Choi Heung-chul	South Korea	6	768
65.	Andrey Lyskovets	Belarus	4	770
65.	Michael Kury	Austria	4	770
67.	Randy Weber	United States	3	771
67.	Lucas Chevalier-Girod	France	3	771
69.	Aleksey Shibko	Belarus	2	772
69.	Ralf Gebstedt	Germany	2	772
69.	Marco Steinauer	Switzerland	2	772

== Team lineups ==
Below is a summary of the team lineups for all national squads that took part in the Ski Jumping World Cup competitions in Zakopane in 1998. Out of the top 15 athletes in the overall World Cup standings, only Noriaki Kasai, who was ranked 11th before the event in Poland, was absent from the start list.

As the host nation, Poland was entitled to field an additional 10 competitors in the qualification rounds from the so-called "national quota", which applies to the two competitions held in the country. As a result, 14 Polish athletes took part in the qualification for each of the events at the Wielka Krokiew hill.

Athlete	Date of birth	World Cup rank	First competition 27 January 1996	Second competition 28 January 1996	First competition 17 January 1998	Second competition 18 January 1998
Austria (8)
Andreas Goldberger	29 November 1972	14	2	1	37	12
Stefan Horngacher	20 September 1969	10	14	15	44	9
Martin Höllwarth	13 April 1974	15	20	38	7	16
Wolfgang Loitzl	13 January 1980	23	–		35	24
Roland Wakolm	1979	–	–		39	16
Matthias Wallner	8 May 1975	36	25	23	45	38
Reinhard Schwarzenberger	7 January 1977	22	3	12	9	25
Andreas Widhölzl	14 October 1976	5	5	13	4	28
Belarus (4)
Siarhiej Babrou	1978	–	–		q	q
Andrey Lyskovets	7 October 1974	–	–		47	27
Aleksandr Sinyavsky	9 March 1977	–	–		q	q
Aleksey Shibko	27 September 1977	66	–		q	42
Czech Republic (4)
Michal Doležal	11 March 1978	30	–		42	36
František Jež	16 December 1970	40	11	24	q	14
Robert Křenek	12 November 1974	45	–		26	46
Jaroslav Sakala	14 July 1969	13	49	32	26	46
Finland (5)
Janne Ahonen	11 May 1977	8	17	19	2	6
Toni Nieminen	31 May 1975	–	46	29	31	35
Ari-Pekka Nikkola	16 May 1969	21	4	3	24	13
Kimmo Savolainen	2 August 1974	16	–		33	22
Jani Soininen	12 November 1972	4	10	20	40	6
France (1)
Lucas Chevalier-Girod	26 January 1976	64	–		36	41
Japan (4)
Kazuyoshi Funaki	27 April 1975	3	–		39	2
Masahiko Harada	9 May 1968	1	–		5	37
Hiroya Saitō	1 September 1970	7	–		21	4
Kazuya Yoshioka	9 September 1978	19	–		30	19
Kazakhstan (1)
Aleksandr Korobov	1 April 1978	–	–		q	q
Germany (8)
Roland Audenrieth	2 July 1979	–	–		10	44
Christof Duffner	16 December 1971	61	16	8	15	21
Sven Hannawald	9 November 1974	9	–		3	3
Ronny Hornschuh	2 February 1975	31	37	40	11	50
Hansjörg Jäkle	19 October 1971	12	30	33	18	8
Martin Schmitt	29 January 1978	29	–		8	30
Gerd Siegmund	7 February 1973	51	21	21	12	17
Dieter Thoma	19 October 1969	2	12	39	43	5
Norway (8)
Tom Aage Aarnes	25 January 1977	–	–		32	q
Kristian Brenden	12 June 1976	28	–		1	10
Sturle Holseter	9 April 1976	61	14	19	14	q
Håvard Lie	21 May 1975	56	–		38	47
Roar Ljøkelsøy	31 May 1976	33	8	4	49	11
Lasse Ottesen	8 April 1974	39	28	36	22	20
Jon Petter Sandaker	24 February 1974	25	–		46	18
Henning Stensrud	20 August 1977	17	–		13	33
Poland (15)
Aleksander Bojda	1978	–	q	q	q	q
Krystian Długopolski	3 August 1980	–	q	q	q	q
Andrzej Galica	6 June 1980	–	q	q	q	q
Bartłomiej Gąsienica-Sieczka	26 September 1973	–	q	q	q	q
Mirosław Grzybowski	30 January 1977	–	–		–	q
Marek Gwóźdź	24 May 1977	–	41	48	q	–
Andrzej Karpiel	1978	–	–		q	q
Łukasz Kruczek	1 November 1975	–	43	q	q	45
Mariusz Maciaś	1 January 1981	–	–		q	q
Adam Małysz	3 December 1977	42	9	6	23	29
Robert Mateja	5 October 1974	44	48	47	6	23
Andrzej Młynarczyk	1973	–	q	q	q	49
Marcin Sitarz	12 October 1978	–	q	q	q	q
Wojciech Skupień	9 March 1976	53	29	28	28	26
Grzegorz Śliwka	19 April 1982	–	–		q	q
Russia (4)
Arthur Khamidulin	30 April 1977	–	–		q	q
Maxim Cubina	12 February 1978	–	–		q	q
Nikolay Petrushin	4 June 1979	–	–		q	q
Aleksandr Volkov	28 April 1978	–	–		q	40
Slovakia (4)
Marián Bielčík	27 August 1973	–	40	25	q	q
Martin Mesík	17 October 1979	–	q	41	48	q
Dušan Oršula	23 August 1979	–	–		q	q
Ján Zelenčík	17 October 1979	–	–		q	32
Slovenia (5)
Urban Franc	5 June 1975	54	–		34	q
Jaka Grosar	4 April 1978	–	–		q	q
Primož Peterka	28 February 1979	6	1	2	17	1
Jure Radelj	26 November 1977	–	–		41	q
Peter Žonta	9 January 1979	47	–		50	34
Switzerland (4)
Sylvain Freiholz	23 November 1974	23	13	22	19	15
Andreas Küttel	25 April 1979	–	–		q	q
Bruno Reuteler	2 April 1971	46	22	17	27	43
Marco Steinauer	13 April 1976	–	24	34	29	q
Ukraine (5)
Volodymyr Hlyvka	24 August 1973	–	–		q	q
Liubym Kohan	2 July 1975	–	–		–	q
Ivan Kozlov	6 May 1978	–	–		q	q
Yurii Mykytynets	12 November 1974	–	–		q	q
Volodymyr Stechniovich	1979	–	–		q	–
Italy (2)
Roberto Cecon	28 December 1971	47	–		25	31
Ivan Lunardi	15 May 1973	–	–		q	q

Legend:

q – athlete did not qualify for the main competition.

– – athlete was not entered for the qualification round.
