= 1996–97 FIS Ski Jumping World Cup =

Ski jumping championship season

1996–97 World Cup
Winners
- Overall: (Slovenia) Primož Peterka
- Ski Jumping (NH, LH): (Germany) Dieter Thoma
- Ski Flying: (Slovenia) Primož Peterka
- Four Hills Tournament: (Slovenia) Primož Peterka
- Nordic Tournament: (Japan) Kazuyoshi Funaki
- Nations Cup: Japan

Competitions
- Venues: 17
- Individual: 25
- Team: 1
- Cancelled: 1

The 1996–97 FIS Ski Jumping World Cup was the 18th World Cup season in ski jumping and the 7th official World Cup season in ski flying with the seventh small crystal globe awarded.

The season began in Lillehammer, Norway on 30 November 1996 and finished in Planica, Slovenia on 23 March 1997. The individual World Cup overall winner was Primož Peterka (first ever big crystal globe for Slovenia); he also won Ski Flying small globe and Four Hills Tournament (both firsts for Slovenia). The Nations Cup was taken by Team of Japan.

25 men's individual events on 17 different venues in 9 countries were held on two different continents (Europe and Asia); one individual event was cancelled due to wind in Hakuba.

At the end of the season in Planica, German physiotherapist Rudi Lorenz helped Slovenia's Primož Peterka who was injured during Friday's training, and was rival to of German Dieter Thoma. three world records have been set and simultaneously broken by Espen Bredesen (210 m), Lasse Ottesen (212 m), and Dieter Thoma (213 m; however, historical registries debate the jump depending on exact fall).

Peaks of the season were FIS Nordic World Ski Championships and Four Hills Tournament.

== World records ==
List of world record distances (both official and invalid) achieved within this World Cup season.

Date	Athlete	Hill	Round	Place	Metres	Feet
22 March 1997	(Norway) Espen Bredesen	Velikanka bratov Gorišek K185	Trial	Planica, Slovenia	210	689
22 March 1997	(Norway) Lasse Ottesen	Velikanka bratov Gorišek K185	Trial	Planica, Slovenia	212	696
22 March 1997	(Germany) Dieter Thoma	Velikanka bratov Gorišek K185	Round 1	Planica, Slovenia	213	699

Longest jump in history at that time, but invalid due to Thoma touched the ground upon landing.

== Map of world cup hosts ==
Europe
Germany	Austria	Asia

== Calendar ==
=== Men's Individual ===
N – normal hill / L – large hill / F – flying hill
All	No.	Date	Place (Hill)	Size	Winner	Second	Third	Overall leader	R.
382	1	30 November 1996	(Norway) Lillehammer (Lysgårdsbakken K120)	L _{221}	(Germany) Dieter Thoma	(Norway) Kristian Brenden	(Japan) Hiroya Saito	(Germany) Dieter Thoma	
383	2	1 December 1996	(Norway) Lillehammer (Lysgårdsbakken K120)	L _{222}	(Norway) Kristian Brenden	(Norway) Espen Bredesen	(Germany) Dieter Thoma	(Norway) Kristian Brenden	
384	3	7 December 1996	(Finland) Kuusamo (Rukatunturi K120)	L _{223}	(Japan) Takanobu Okabe	(Japan) Kazuyoshi Funaki	(Austria) Andreas Goldberger	(Germany) Dieter Thoma	
385	4	8 December 1996	(Finland) Kuusamo (Rukatunturi K120)	L _{224}	(Slovenia) Primož Peterka	(Norway) Lasse Ottesen	(Japan) Takanobu Okabe	(Germany) Dieter Thoma	
386	5	14 December 1996	(Czech Republic) Harrachov (Čerťák K120)	L _{225}	(Japan) Kazuyoshi Funaki	(Slovenia) Primož Peterka	(Japan) Takanobu Okabe	(Japan) Takanobu Okabe	
387	6	15 December 1996	(Czech Republic) Harrachov (Čerťák K120)	L _{226}	(Slovenia) Primož Peterka	(Austria) Andreas Goldberger	(Norway) Kristian Brenden	(Slovenia) Primož Peterka	
388	7	29 December 1996	(Germany) Oberstdorf (Schattenbergschanze K115)	L _{227}	(Germany) Dieter Thoma	(Norway) Kristian Brenden	(Austria) Andreas Goldberger	(Slovenia) Primož Peterka	
389	8	1 January 1997	(Germany) Garmisch-Pa (Große Olympiaschanze K115)	L _{228}	(Slovenia) Primož Peterka	(Austria) Andreas Goldberger	(Japan) Takanobu Okabe	(Slovenia) Primož Peterka	
390	9	4 January 1997	(Austria) Innsbruck (Bergiselschanze K110)	L _{229}	(Japan) Kazuyoshi Funaki	(Slovenia) Primož Peterka	(Finland) Ari-Pekka Nikkola	(Slovenia) Primož Peterka	
391	10	6 January 1997	(Austria) Bischofshofen (Paul-Ausserleitner K120)	L _{230}	(Germany) Dieter Thoma	(Poland) Adam Małysz	(Slovenia) Primož Peterka	(Slovenia) Primož Peterka	
45th Four Hills Tournament Overall (29 December 1996 – 6 January 1997)					(Slovenia) Primož Peterka	(Austria) Andreas Goldberger	(Germany) Dieter Thoma	4H Tournament	
392	11	11 January 1997	(Switzerland) Engelberg (Gross-Titlis-Schanze K120)	L _{231}	(Slovenia) Primož Peterka	(Germany) Dieter Thoma	(Poland) Adam Małysz	(Slovenia) Primož Peterka	
393	12	12 January 1997	(Switzerland) Engelberg (Gross-Titlis-Schanze K120)	L _{232}	(Slovenia) Primož Peterka	(Finland) Janne Ahonen	(Finland) Jani Soininen	(Slovenia) Primož Peterka	
394	13	18 January 1997	(Japan) Sapporo ((Miyanomori K90) (Ōkurayama K120)	N _{129}	(Poland) Adam Małysz	(Norway) Sturle Holseter (Finland) Mika Laitinen		(Slovenia) Primož Peterka	
395	14	19 January 1997	(Japan) Sapporo ((Miyanomori K90) (Ōkurayama K120)	L _{233}	(Germany) Dieter Thoma	(Norway) Roar Ljøkelsøy	(Japan) Takanobu Okabe	(Slovenia) Primož Peterka	
		25 January 1997	(Japan) Hakuba (Olympic Hills K90, K120)	N _{cnx}	cancelled due to strong wind			—	
396	15	26 January 1997	(Japan) Hakuba (Olympic Hills K90, K120)	L _{234}	(Poland) Adam Małysz	(Japan) Noriaki Kasai	(Japan) Masahiko Harada	(Slovenia) Primož Peterka	
397	16	1 February 1997	(Germany) Willingen (Mühlenkopfschanze K120)	L _{235}	(Austria) Martin Höllwarth	(Germany) Dieter Thoma	(Slovenia) Primož Peterka	(Germany) Dieter Thoma	
398	17	2 February 1997	(Germany) Willingen (Mühlenkopfschanze K120)	L _{236}	(Japan) Hiroya Saito	(Germany) Dieter Thoma	(Norway) Roar Ljøkelsøy	(Germany) Dieter Thoma	
399	18	8 February 1997	(Austria) Bad Mitterndorf (Kulm K185)	F _{034}	(Japan) Takanobu Okabe	(Austria) Andreas Goldberger	(Slovenia) Primož Peterka	(Slovenia) Primož Peterka	
400	19	9 February 1997	(Austria) Bad Mitterndorf (Kulm K185)	F _{035}	(Slovenia) Primož Peterka	(Austria) Andreas Goldberger	(Japan) Takanobu Okabe	(Slovenia) Primož Peterka	
FIS Nordic World Ski Championships 1997 (22 February – 1 March • (Norway) Trondheim)
401	20	9 March 1997	(Finland) Lahti (Salpausselkä K114)	L _{237}	(Austria) Andreas Widhölzl	(Finland) Pasi Kytösaho	(Finland) Jani Soininen (Japan) Kazuyoshi Funaki	(Slovenia) Primož Peterka	
402	21	12 March 1997	(Finland) Kuopio (Puijo K90)	N _{130}	(Japan) Kazuyoshi Funaki	(France) Nicolas Dessum	(Slovenia) Primož Peterka	(Slovenia) Primož Peterka	
403	22	13 March 1997	(Sweden) Falun (Lugnet K115)	L _{238}	(Slovenia) Primož Peterka	(Germany) Dieter Thoma	(Japan) Hiroya Saito	(Slovenia) Primož Peterka	
404	23	16 March 1997	(Norway) Oslo (Holmenkollbakken K112)	L _{239}	(Japan) Kazuyoshi Funaki	(Japan) Hiroya Saito	(Switzerland) Bruno Reuteler	(Slovenia) Primož Peterka	
1st Nordic Tournament Overall (9 – 16 March 1997)					(Japan) Kazuyoshi Funaki	(Norway) Kristian Brenden	(Austria) Andreas Widhölzl	Nordic Tournament	
405	24	22 March 1997	(Slovenia) Planica (Velikanka bratov Gorišek K185)	F _{036}	(Japan) Takanobu Okabe	(Japan) Kazuyoshi Funaki	(Finland) Jani Soininen	(Slovenia) Primož Peterka	
406	25	23 March 1997	(Slovenia) Planica (Velikanka bratov Gorišek K185)	F _{037}	(Japan) Akira Higashi	(Slovenia) Primož Peterka	(Norway) Lasse Ottesen	(Slovenia) Primož Peterka	
18th FIS World Cup Overall (30 November 1996 – 23 March 1997)					(Slovenia) Primož Peterka	(Germany) Dieter Thoma	(Japan) Kazuyoshi Funaki	World Cup Overall	

=== Men's Team ===
All	No.	Date	Place (Hill)	Size	Winner	Second	Third	R.
12	1	8 March 1997	(Finland) Lahti; Salpausselkä K114)	L _{012}	Finland Janne Ahonen; Jani Soininen; Ari-Pekka Nikkola; Mika Laitinen	Austria Andreas Widhölzl; Martin Höllwarth; Stefan Horngacher; Andreas Goldberger	Norway Roar Ljøkelsøy; Håvard Lie; Simen Berntsen; Lasse Ottesen	

== Standings ==
=== Overall ===
Rank	after 25 events	Points
1	(Slovenia) Primož Peterka	1402
2	(Germany) Dieter Thoma	1208
3	(Japan) Kazuyoshi Funaki	1018
4	(Japan) Takanobu Okabe	941
5	(Japan) Hiroya Saito	923
6	(Austria) Andreas Goldberger	817
7	(Norway) Kristian Brenden	793
8	(Finland) Janne Ahonen	734
9	(Finland) Jani Soininen	657
10	(Poland) Adam Małysz	612

=== Ski Jumping (JP) Cup ===
Rank	after 21 events	Points
1	(Germany) Dieter Thoma	1150
2	(Slovenia) Primož Peterka	1112
3	(Japan) Hiroya Saito	842
4	(Japan) Kazuyoshi Funaki	817
5	(Norway) Kristian Brenden	750
6	(Japan) Takanobu Okabe	681
7	(Austria) Andreas Goldberger	657
8	(Poland) Adam Małysz	607
9	(Finland) Janne Ahonen	598
10	(Finland) Jani Soininen	530

=== Ski Flying ===
Rank	after 4 events	Points
1	(Slovenia) Primož Peterka	290
2	(Japan) Takanobu Okabe	260
3	(Japan) Kazuyoshi Funaki	201
4	(Norway) Lasse Ottesen	163
5	(Austria) Andreas Goldberger	160
6	(Japan) Akira Higashi	153
7	(Finland) Janne Ahonen	136
8	(Finland) Jani Soininen	127
9	(Norway) Roar Ljøkelsøy	100
10	(Czech Republic) Jaroslav Sakala	98

=== Nations Cup ===
Rank	after 26 events	Points
1	Japan	4152
2	Norway	3121
3	Finland	3077
4	Austria	2024
5	Germany	1959
6	Slovenia	1656
7	Poland	782
8	Czech Republic	720
9	France	594
10	Switzerland	492

=== Four Hills Tournament ===
Rank	after 4 events	Points
1	(Slovenia) Primož Peterka	971.5
2	(Austria) Andreas Goldberger	943.2
3	(Germany) Dieter Thoma	943.1
4	(Japan) Takanobu Okabe	924.3
5	(Japan) Hiroya Saito	921.0
6	(Finland) Ari-Pekka Nikkola	899.0
7	(Finland) Mika Laitinen	895.3
8	(Poland) Adam Małysz	891.5
9	(Finland) Jani Soininen	885.3
10	(Japan) Kazuyoshi Funaki	880.1

=== Nordic Tournament ===
Rank	after 4 events	Points
1	(Japan) Kazuyoshi Funaki	785.6
2	(Norway) Kristian Brenden	757.6
3	(Austria) Andreas Widhölzl	738.9
4	(Finland) Janne Ahonen	737.0
5	(Poland) Adam Małysz	701.8
6	(Slovenia) Primož Peterka	683.5
7	(Switzerland) Bruno Reuteler	682.3
8	(Norway) Håvard Lie	669.6
9	(Norway) Simen Berntsen	656.3
10	(Germany) Dieter Thoma	647.9

== See also ==
- 1996 Grand Prix (top level summer series)
- 1996–97 FIS Continental Cup (2nd level competition)
