= Nordic Tournament 1998 =

The 1998 Nordic Tournament was the second edition of the event and took place in Lahti, Falun, Trondheim, and Oslo from 8 to 15 March 1998.

== Results ==
Date	Place	Hill	Size	Winner	Second	Third	Ref.
8 March 1998	(Finland) Lahti	Salpausselkä K-114	LH	(Slovenia) Primož Peterka	(Finland) Jani Soininen	(Norway) Kristian Brenden	
11 March 1998	(Sweden) Falun	Lugnet K-115	LH	(Slovenia) Primož Peterka	(Austria) Andreas Widhölzl	(Japan) Hiroya Saito	
13 March 1998	(Norway) Trondheim	Granåsen K-120	LH	(Japan) Masahiko Harada	(Japan) Noriaki Kasai	(Italy) Roberto Cecon	
15 March 1998	(Norway) Oslo	Holmenkollbakken K-112	LH	(Slovenia) Primož Peterka	(Switzerland) Bruno Reuteler	(Japan) Masahiko Harada	

== Overall ==
Pos	Ski Jumper	Points
1	(Austria) Andreas Widhölzl	974.6
2	(Germany) Sven Hannawald	927.0
3	(Japan) Hiroya Saito	910.5
4	(Japan) Noriaki Kasai	904.5
5	(Switzerland) Sylvain Freiholz	895.9
6	(Italy) Roberto Cecon	894.9
7	(Germany) Hansjörg Jäkle	889.2
8	(Japan) Kazuyoshi Funaki	879.5
9	(Finland) Janne Ahonen	856.3
10	(Slovenia) Primož Peterka	844.2
