= 1997–98 FIS Ski Jumping World Cup =

Ski jumping championship season

1997–98 World Cup
Winners
- Overall: (Slovenia) Primož Peterka
- Ski Jumping (NH, LH): (Slovenia) Primož Peterka
- Ski Flying: (Germany) Sven Hannawald
- Four Hills Tournament: (Japan) Kazuyoshi Funaki
- Nordic Tournament: (Austria) Andreas Widhölzl
- Nations Cup: Japan

Competitions
- Venues: 19
- Individual: 27
- Cancelled: 1

The 1997–98 FIS Ski Jumping World Cup was the 19th World Cup season in ski jumping and the 8th official World Cup season in ski flying with the eighth small crystal globe awarded.

The season began in Lillehammer, Norway on 29 November 1997 and finished in Planica, Slovenia on 22 March 1998. The individual World Cup overall winner was Primož Peterka for the second year in a row, Sven Hannawald took the Ski Flying small crystal globe, Kazuyoshi Funaki won Four Hills Tournament and the Nations Cup was taken by Team of Japan.

27 men's individual events on 19 different venues in 11 countries were held on two different continents (Europe and Asia). There were a lot of problems with weather at the beginning of the season in Harrachov due to a lack of snow moved from large to normal hill; and in Oberhof due to warm weather and rain; it was rescheduled two times in total, finally to Lahti in March. Also one scheduled team event was cancelled as only 6 teams applied instead of at least 8 required.

Peaks of the season were Winter Olympics, FIS Ski Flying World Championships (also counted for World Cup for fourth Championship in a row), 4H Tournament and Nordic Tournament.

== Map of world cup hosts ==
Europe
Germany	Austria	Asia

== Calendar ==
=== Men's Individual ===
N – normal hill / L – large hill / F – flying hill
All	No.	Date	Place (Hill)	Size	Winner	Second	Third	Overall leader	R.
407	1	29 November 1997	(Norway) Lillehammer (Lysgårdsbakken K120)	L _{240}	(Germany) Dieter Thoma	(Finland) Jani Soininen	(Japan) Noriaki Kasai	(Germany) Dieter Thoma	
408	2	30 November 1997	(Norway) Lillehammer (Lysgårdsbakken K120)	L _{241}	(Finland) Jani Soininen	(Japan) Masahiko Harada	(Germany) Dieter Thoma	(Finland) Jani Soininen	
409	3	6 December 1997	(Italy) Predazzo (Trampolino dal Ben K90)	N _{131}	(Finland) Jani Soininen	(Slovenia) Primož Peterka	(Austria) Andreas Widhölzl	(Finland) Jani Soininen	
410	4	8 December 1997	(Austria) Villach (Villacher Alpenarena K90)	N _{132}	(Japan) Masahiko Harada	(Germany) Dieter Thoma	(Slovenia) Primož Peterka (Finland) Mika Laitinen	(Finland) Jani Soininen	
		12 December 1997	(Czech Republic) Harrachov (Čerťák K90, K120)	L _{cnx}	moved to normal hill due to lack of snow on large hill			—	
411	5	(Note: Cancelled large hill event from Harrachov (12 December) was moved to normal hill on the same day.)12 December 1997	(Czech Republic) Harrachov (Čerťák K90, K120)	N _{133}	(Japan) Masahiko Harada	(Slovenia) Primož Peterka (Germany) Dieter Thoma		(Japan) Masahiko Harada	
		(Note: Cancelled large hill event from Oberhof (14 December) was unsuccessfully moved to normal hill in Harrachov (13 December).)13 December 1997	(Czech Republic) Harrachov (Čerťák K90, K120)	N _{cnx}	replacement for cancelled event in Oberhof on 14 December (on surprise of organisers and coaches cancelled due to good head wind)			—	
		14 December 1997	(Germany) Oberhof (Kanzlersgrund K120)	L _{cnx}	cancelled due to warm weather and rain (unsuccessfully moved to Harrachov and finally to Lahti)			—	
412	6	20 December 1997	(Switzerland) Engelberg (Gross-Titlis K120)	L _{242}	(Austria) Andreas Widhölzl	(Austria) Stefan Horngacher	(Finland) Janne Ahonen	(Germany) Dieter Thoma	
413	7	21 December 1997	(Switzerland) Engelberg (Gross-Titlis K120)	L _{243}	(Japan) Masahiko Harada	(Slovenia) Primož Peterka	(Austria) Stefan Horngacher	(Japan) Masahiko Harada	
414	8	29 December 1997	(Germany) Oberstdorf (Schattenberg K115)	L _{244}	(Japan) Kazuyoshi Funaki	(Japan) Hiroya Saito	(Finland) Ari-Pekka Nikkola	(Japan) Masahiko Harada	
415	9	1 January 1998	(Germany) Garmisch-Pa (Gr. Olympiaschanze K115)	L _{245}	(Japan) Kazuyoshi Funaki	(Japan) Masahiko Harada	(Japan) Hiroya Saito	(Japan) Masahiko Harada	
416	10	4 January 1998	(Austria) Innsbruck (Bergiselschanze K110)	L _{246}	(Japan) Kazuyoshi Funaki	(Germany) Sven Hannawald	(Finland) Janne Ahonen	(Japan) Masahiko Harada	
417	11	6 January 1998	(Austria) Bischofshofen (Paul-Ausserleitner K120)	L _{247}	(Germany) Sven Hannawald	(Germany) Hansjörg Jäkle	(Finland) Janne Ahonen	(Japan) Masahiko Harada	
46th Four Hills Tournament Overall (29 December 1997 – 6 January 1998)					(Japan) Kazuyoshi Funaki	(Germany) Sven Hannawald	(Finland) Janne Ahonen	4H Tournament	
418	12	11 January 1998	(Austria) Ramsau (W90-Mattensprunga. K90)	N _{134}	(Japan) Masahiko Harada	(Japan) Kazuyoshi Funaki	(Japan) Hiroya Saito	(Japan) Masahiko Harada	
419	13	17 January 1998	(Poland) Zakopane (Wielka Krokiew K116)	L _{248}	(Norway) Kristian Brenden	(Finland) Janne Ahonen	(Germany) Sven Hannawald	(Japan) Masahiko Harada	
420	14	18 January 1998	(Poland) Zakopane (Wielka Krokiew K116)	L _{249}	(Slovenia) Primož Peterka	(Japan) Kazuyoshi Funaki	(Germany) Sven Hannawald	(Japan) Masahiko Harada	
FIS World Cup 1997/98 = FIS Ski Flying World Championships 1998 (24 – 25 January • Oberstdorf)
421	15	24 January 1998	(Germany) Oberstdorf (Heini-Klopfer K185)	F _{038}	(Germany) Sven Hannawald	(Japan) Kazuyoshi Funaki	(Norway) Kristian Brenden	(Japan) Masahiko Harada	
422	16	25 January 1998	(Germany) Oberstdorf (Heini-Klopfer K185)	F _{039}	(Japan) Kazuyoshi Funaki	(Germany) Dieter Thoma	(Germany) Sven Hannawald	(Japan) Kazuyoshi Funaki	
423	17	5 February 1998	(Japan) Sapporo (Ōkurayama K120)	L _{250}	(Austria) Andreas Widhölzl	(Finland) Jani Soininen	(Finland) Janne Ahonen	(Japan) Kazuyoshi Funaki	
1998 Winter Olympics (11 – 15 February • (Japan) Nagano)
		28 February 1998	(Norway) Vikersund (Vikersundbakken K175)	F _{cnx}	cancelled due to strong wind; postponed on next day			—	
424	18	1 March 1998	(Norway) Vikersund (Vikersundbakken K175)	F _{040}	(Austria) Andreas Widhölzl	(Germany) Sven Hannawald	(Japan) Akira Higashi	(Japan) Kazuyoshi Funaki	
425	19	1 March 1998	(Norway) Vikersund (Vikersundbakken K175)	F _{041}	(Japan) Takanobu Okabe	(Japan) Hiroya Saito	(Japan) Noriaki Kasai	(Japan) Kazuyoshi Funaki	
426	20	4 March 1998	(Finland) Kuopio (Puijo K120)	L _{251}	(Austria) Andreas Widhölzl	(Slovenia) Primož Peterka	(Japan) Hiroya Saito	(Japan) Kazuyoshi Funaki	
427	21	(Note: Cancelled event from Oberhof first moved to Harrachov (again cancelled) and finally to Lahti.)7 March 1998	(Finland) Lahti (Salpausselkä K114)	L _{252}	(Finland) Janne Ahonen	(Austria) Andreas Widhölzl	(Norway) Kristian Brenden	(Japan) Kazuyoshi Funaki	
428	22	8 March 1998	(Finland) Lahti (Salpausselkä K114)	L _{253}	(Slovenia) Primož Peterka	(Finland) Jani Soininen	(Norway) Kristian Brenden	(Japan) Kazuyoshi Funaki	
429	23	11 March 1998	(Sweden) Falun (Lugnet K115)	L _{254}	(Slovenia) Primož Peterka	(Austria) Andreas Widhölzl	(Japan) Hiroya Saito	(Austria) Andreas Widhölzl	
430	24	13 March 1998	(Norway) Trondheim (Granåsen K120)	L _{255}	(Japan) Masahiko Harada	(Japan) Noriaki Kasai	(Italy) Roberto Cecon	(Austria) Andreas Widhölzl	
431	25	15 March 1998	(Norway) Oslo (Holmenkollbakken K112)	L _{256}	(Slovenia) Primož Peterka	(Switzerland) Bruno Reuteler	(Japan) Masahiko Harada	(Austria) Andreas Widhölzl	
2nd Nordic Tournament Overall (8–15 March 1998)					(Austria) Andreas Widhölzl	(Germany) Sven Hannawald	(Japan) Hiroya Saito	Nordic Tournament	
432	26	21 March 1998	(Slovenia) Planica (Bloudkova velikanka K120)	L _{257}	(Japan) Kazuyoshi Funaki	(Slovenia) Primož Peterka	(Japan) Hiroya Saito	(Slovenia) Primož Peterka	
433	27	22 March 1998	(Slovenia) Planica (Bloudkova velikanka K120)	L _{258}	(Japan) Noriaki Kasai	(Japan) Hiroya Saito	(Austria) Martin Höllwarth	(Slovenia) Primož Peterka	
19th FIS World Cup Overall (29 November 1997 – 22 March 1998)					(Slovenia) Primož Peterka	(Japan) Kazuyoshi Funaki	(Austria) Andreas Widhölzl	World Cup Overall	

=== Men's Team ===
All	No.	Date	Place (Hill)	Size	Winner	Second	Third	R.
		7 March 1998	(Finland) Lahti; Salpausselkä K114)	L _{cnx}	cancelled as only 6 teams applied; minimum 8 needed (they used this to replace cancelled individual event from Oberhof)			

== Standings ==
=== Overall ===
Rank	after 27 events	Points
1	(Slovenia) Primož Peterka	1253
2	(Japan) Kazuyoshi Funaki	1234
3	(Austria) Andreas Widhölzl	1208
4	(Japan) Masahiko Harada	1120
5	(Japan) Hiroya Saito	962
6	(Germany) Sven Hannawald	953
7	(Finland) Jani Soininen	950
8	(Germany) Dieter Thoma	921
9	(Finland) Janne Ahonen	836
10	(Japan) Noriaki Kasai	720

=== Ski Jumping (JP) Cup ===
Rank	after 23 events	Points
1	(Slovenia) Primož Peterka	1082
2	(Japan) Masahiko Harada	1076
3	(Austria) Andreas Widhölzl	1037
4	(Japan) Kazuyoshi Funaki	1017
5	(Finland) Jani Soininen	903
6	(Japan) Hiroya Saito	850
7	(Germany) Dieter Thoma	771
8	(Finland) Janne Ahonen	741
9	(Germany) Sven Hannawald	695
10	(Japan) Noriaki Kasai	642

=== Ski Flying ===
Rank	after 4 events	Points
1	(Germany) Sven Hannawald	258
2	(Japan) Kazuyoshi Funaki	217
3	(Austria) Andreas Widhölzl	171
	(Slovenia) Primož Peterka	171
5	(Norway) Lasse Ottesen	157
6	(Germany) Dieter Thoma	150
	(Japan) Takanobu Okabe	150
8	(Japan) Akira Higashi	123
9	(Norway) Kristian Brenden	123
10	(Japan) Hiroya Saito	112

=== Nations Cup ===
Rank	after 27 events	Points
1	Japan	5224
2	Austria	3200
3	Germany	3176
4	Finland	2758
5	Norway	1987
6	Slovenia	1428
7	Switzerland	511
8	Czech Republic	500
9	Poland	234
10	Italy	199

=== Four Hills Tournament ===
Rank	after 4 events	Points
1	(Japan) Kazuyoshi Funaki	944.0
2	(Germany) Sven Hannawald	912.8
3	(Finland) Janne Ahonen	907.0
4	(Austria) Andreas Goldberger	884.4
5	(Finland) Jani Soininen	863.7
6	(Germany) Dieter Thoma	859.1
7	(Austria) Andreas Widhölzl	831.8
8	(Austria) Stefan Horngacher	808.8
9	(Japan) Kazuya Yoshioka	804.3
10	(Japan) Masahiko Harada	777.9

=== Nordic Tournament ===
Rank	after 5 events	Points
1	(Austria) Andreas Widhölzl	974.6
2	(Germany) Sven Hannawald	927.0
3	(Japan) Hiroya Saito	910.5
4	(Japan) Noriaki Kasai	904.5
5	(Switzerland) Sylvain Freiholz	895.9
6	(Italy) Roberto Cecon	894.9
7	(Germany) Hansjörg Jäkle	889.2
8	(Japan) Kazuyoshi Funaki	879.5
9	(Finland) Janne Ahonen	856.3
10	(Slovenia) Primož Peterka	844.2

== See also ==
- 1997 Grand Prix (top level summer series)
- 1997–98 FIS Continental Cup (2nd level competition)
- 1997–98 FIS Ski Jumping World Cup – Zakopane
