= 1996–97 Four Hills Tournament =

Ski jumping competition

The 1996-97 Four Hills Tournament took place at the four traditional venues of Oberstdorf, Garmisch-Partenkirchen, Innsbruck and Bischofshofen, located in Germany and Austria, between 29 December 1996 and 6 January 1997.

== Results ==
Date	Place	Hill	Size	Winner	Second	Third	Ref.
29 Dec 1996	(Germany) Oberstdorf	Schattenbergschanze K-115	LH	(Germany) Dieter Thoma	(Norway) Kristian Brenden	(Austria) Andreas Goldberger	
1 Jan 1997	(Germany) Garmisch-Partenkirchen	Große Olympiaschanze K-115	LH	(Slovenia) Primož Peterka	(Austria) Andreas Goldberger	(Japan) Takanobu Okabe	
4 Jan 1997	(Austria) Innsbruck	Bergiselschanze K-110	LH	(Japan) Kazuyoshi Funaki	(Slovenia) Primož Peterka	(Finland) Ari-Pekka Nikkola	
6 Jan 1997	(Austria) Bischofshofen	Paul-Ausserleitner-Schanze K-120	LH	(Germany) Dieter Thoma	(Poland) Adam Małysz	(Slovenia) Primož Peterka	

== Overall ==
Pos	Ski Jumper	Points
1	(Slovenia) Primož Peterka	971.5
2	(Austria) Andreas Goldberger	943.2
3	(Germany) Dieter Thoma	943.1
4	(Japan) Takanobu Okabe	924.3
5	(Japan) Hiroya Saito	921.0
6	(Finland) Ari-Pekka Nikkola	899.0
7	(Finland) Mika Laitinen	895.3
8	(Poland) Adam Małysz	891.5
9	(Finland) Jani Soininen	885.3
10	(Japan) Kazuyoshi Funaki	880.1
