= FIS Ski Flying World Championships 1998 =

1998 edition of the FIS Ski-Flying World Championships

- Official logo for the FIS Ski Flying World Championships 1998.
- Host city: Oberstdorf, Germany
- Nations: 12
- Athletes: 45
- Events: 1
- Opening: 22 January
- Closing: 25 January
- Main venue: Heini-Klopfer-Skiflugschanze

The FIS Ski Flying World Ski Championships 1998 took place on 25 January 1998 in Oberstdorf, Germany for the record-tying fourth time, matching that of Planica, Slovenia. Oberstdorf hosted the championships previously in West Germany in 1973, 1981, and 1988. Japan's Kazuyoshi Funaki would go on to win the gold medal in the individual large hill event at the 1998 Winter Olympics in Nagano nearly three weeks later. As of 2009, he is the only person to win the Ski Flying World Championships and a Winter Olympic gold medal in the same year. Dieter Thoma became the first person to medal for two different nations at the championships with his bronze (He won the championships in 1990 while competing for West Germany.).

== Individual ==
25 February 1998

Medal	Athlete	Points
Gold	Kazuyoshi Funaki (JPN)	776.4
Silver	Sven Hannawald (GER)	769.9
Bronze	Dieter Thoma (GER)	749.9

== Medal table ==
Rank	Nation	Gold	Silver	Bronze	Total
1	Japan (JPN)	1	0	0	1
2	Germany (GER)	0	1	1	2
Totals (2 entries)		1	1	1	3
