= Primož Peterka =

Slovenian ski jumper (born 1979)

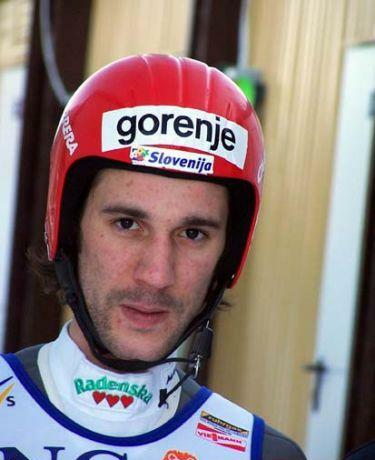
- Peterka in 2004

Personal information
- Born: 28 February 1979 (age 47) Ljubljana, SR Slovenia, SFR Yugoslavia
- Height: 1.82 m (5 ft 11 1/2 in)

Sport
- Sport: Ski jumping

World Cup career
- Seasons: 1996–2009
- Indiv. starts: 230
- Indiv. podiums: 32
- Indiv. wins: 15
- Team starts: 21
- Team podiums: 2
- Overall titles: 2 (1997, 1998)
- Four Hills titles: 1 (1997)
- Ski Flying titles: 1 (1997)
- JP titles: 1 (1998)

Achievements and titles
- Personal bests: 212 m (696 ft); Planica, 18 Mar 2000
Medal record
Men's ski jumping
Olympic Games
Bronze medal – third place	2002 Salt Lake City	Team LH
World Championships
Bronze medal – third place	2005 Oberstdorf	Team NH

Primož Peterka (Slovene pronunciation: [ˈpriːmɔʃ ˈpeːtərka]) is a Slovenian former ski jumper who competed from 1996 to 2011. He is one of the most successful athletes from Slovenia, having won fifteen individual World Cup competitions, two consecutive overall World Cup titles, a Ski Flying World Cup title, and the Four Hills Tournament.

== Career ==
Peterka started ski jumping on a small hill (with a K-point at around 20 metres) near his hometown of Moravče, a small town about 30 km northeast from Ljubljana. He later joined the Triglav ski club in Kranj.

=== 1995–1996 ===
Peterka made his World Cup debut on 4 January 1996. Due to the poor performance of Slovenian competitors at the time, Peterka was brought in as a replacement for the Four Hills Tournament event in Innsbruck, where he finished eighth. Peterka continued his good form, winning the competitions in Zakopane and Falun, and finished the season tenth overall. He also finished second behind Michael Uhrmann at the 1996 Junior World Championships.

=== 1996–1997 ===
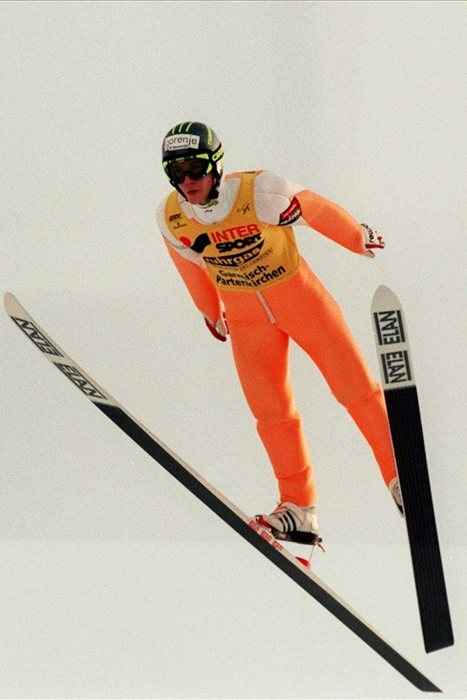
Peterka in Garmisch-Partenkirchen, 1997

The 1996–97 season was a great success for Peterka. He won seven individual World Cup competitions and won both the overall World Cup title and the Four Hills Tournament. He also finished first in the ski flying standings. On 9 February 1997, Peterka became the first Slovenian to record a jump over 200 metres, landing at 203 metres in Kulm.

=== 1997–1998 ===
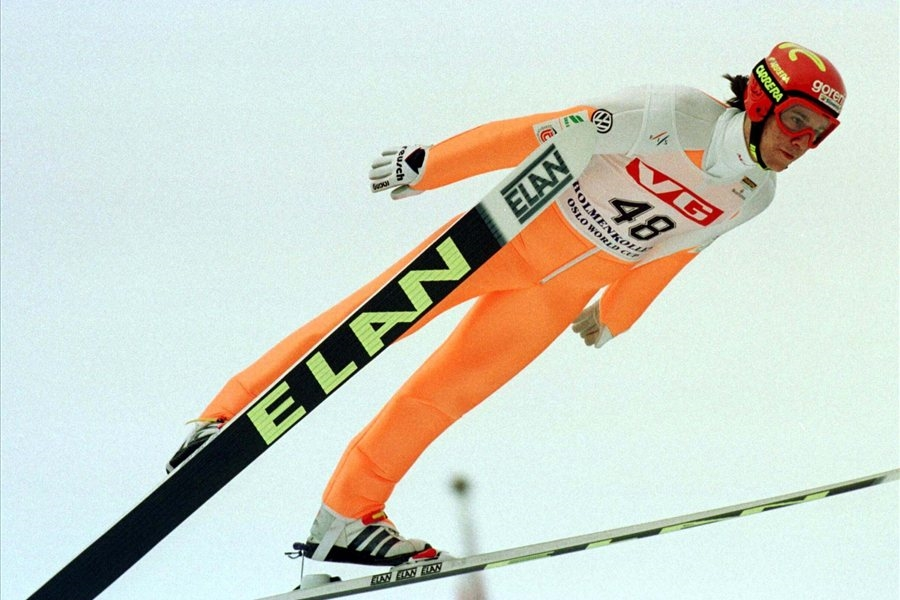
Peterka in Oslo, 1998

In the 1997–98 season, Peterka won four individual competitions and a second consecutive World Cup title, defeating Kazuyoshi Funaki in the final competition of the season. At the 1998 Winter Olympics in Nagano, Peterka claimed fifth place in the individual large hill competition and sixth in the individual normal hill competition.

=== Later career ===
In the 2001–02 World Cup season, Peterka returned to the ski jumping elite. At the 2002 Winter Olympics in Salt Lake City, he won the bronze team medal. The 2002–03 season was also successful, with Peterka winning two individual events (Kuusamo and Garmisch-Partenkirchen) and finishing the season seventh overall.

From 2004 onwards, Peterka never finished in the top 10 in an individual World Cup event. However, at the 2005 World Championships in Oberstdorf he won another bronze team medal for Slovenia, together with Jure Bogataj, Rok Benkovič and Jernej Damjan. This made Peterka the first Slovenian ski jumper to win medals both at the Olympics and at the World Championships. After the 2010–11 season, Peterka officially retired from competitive ski jumping.

== Personal life ==
Peterka was born in Prikrnica, near Ljubljana, Slovenia (then part of Yugoslavia).

His younger brother Uroš was also a ski jumper.

== World Cup results ==
=== Standings ===
Season	Overall	4H	SF	NT	JP
1995–96	10	38	—	N/A	9
1996–97	1st place, gold medalist(s)	1st place, gold medalist(s)	1st place, gold medalist(s)	6	2nd place, silver medalist(s)
1997–98	1st place, gold medalist(s)	22	3rd place, bronze medalist(s)	10	1st place, gold medalist(s)
1998–99	27	28	20	33	31
1999–00	67	51	—	—	66
2000–01	—	—	—	—	N/A
2001–02	25	13	N/A	14	N/A
2002–03	7	5	N/A	27	N/A
2003–04	45	28	N/A	33	N/A
2004–05	34	38	N/A	23	N/A
2005–06	32	21	N/A	33	N/A
2006–07	81	—	N/A	—	N/A
2007–08	40	—	N/A	39	N/A
2008–09	47	45	—	—	N/A

=== Individual wins ===
No.	Season	Date	Location	Hill	Size
1	1995–96	27 January 1996	(Poland) Zakopane	Wielka Krokiew K116	LH
2	1995–96	13 March 1996	(Sweden) Falun	Lugnet K90	NH
3	1996–97	8 December 1996	(Finland) Kuusamo	Rukatunturi K120	LH
4	1996–97	15 December 1996	(Czech Republic) Harrachov	Čerťák K120	LH
5	1996–97	1 January 1997	(Germany) Garmisch-Partenkirchen	Große Olympiaschanze K115	LH
6	1996–97	11 January 1997	(Switzerland) Engelberg	Gross-Titlis-Schanze K120	LH
7	1996–97	12 January 1997	(Switzerland) Engelberg	Gross-Titlis-Schanze K120	LH
8	1996–97	9 February 1997	(Austria) Tauplitz/Bad Mitterndorf	Kulm K185	FH
9	1996–97	13 March 1997	(Sweden) Falun	Lugnet K115	LH
10	1997–98	18 January 1998	(Poland) Zakopane	Wielka Krokiew K116	LH
11	1997–98	8 March 1998	(Finland) Lahti	Salpausselkä K116	LH
12	1997–98	11 March 1998	(Sweden) Falun	Lugnet K115	LH
13	1997–98	15 March 1998	(Norway) Oslo	Holmenkollbakken K112	LH
14	2002–03	29 November 2002	(Finland) Kuusamo	Rukatunturi K120	LH
15	2002–03	1 January 2003	(Germany) Garmisch-Partenkirchen	Große Olympiaschanze K115	LH

== In popular culture ==
Three sports documentary films have been made about his life and career. The first is called Vleci, Primož (English: Fly, Primož) and was directed by Beno Hvala in 1997, detailing the story of Peterka's early career. The second, Peterka: leto odločitve (English: Peterka: Year of Decision), was directed by Vlado Škafar in 2003 and focuses on Peterka's personal crisis and his struggle to find his way back to the top. The third was made in 2011 by RTV Slovenija, called Skoki so moje življenje (English: Ski jumping is my life), directed by Tomaž Kovšca and starring Aleš Potočnik and Polona Bertoncelj.

Olympic Games
Previous: Jure Košir	Flagbearer for Slovenia; Nagano 1998	Next: Dejan Košir
