= Pasi Kytösaho =

Finnish ski jumper

Personal information
- Full name: Pasi Kytösaho

Sport
- Sport: Skiing

World Cup career
- Seasons: 1992–1993; 1995–1998
- Indiv. podiums: 1
- Updated on 30 Mar 2015

Pasi Kytösaho is a Finnish former ski jumper.
