= Hakuba Ski Jumping Stadium =

Sports venue in Hakuba, Japan

Coordinates: 36.695315°N 137.837391°E

Hakuba
- Hakuba
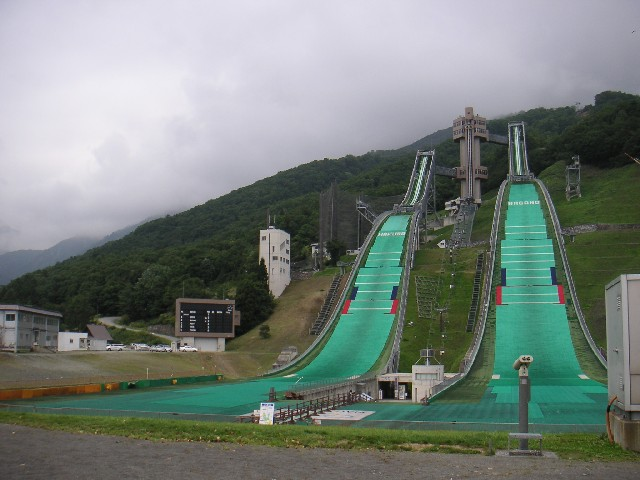
- Location: Hakuba; Japan
- Opened: 1992

Size
- K–point: K-90; K-120
- Hill size: HS98; HS131
- Hill record: (Japan) Masahiko Harada (98.5 m in 1996) (Japan) Masahiko Harada, (Japan) Takanobu Okabe (137.0 m in 1998)

Top events
- Olympics: 1998

Hakuba Ski Jumping Stadium is a ski jumping hill in Hakuba, Japan. It hosted the ski jumping and the ski jumping part of the Nordic combined events at the 1998 Winter Olympics. The stadium holds a maximum of 45,000 spectators, and was built in 1992.
