= Ski jumping at the 1998 Winter Olympics =

Ski jumping at the XVIII Olympic Winter Games
- Venue: Hakuba Ski Jumping Stadium
- Dates: 11–17 February 1998
- Competitors: 68 from 19 nations

Ski jumping at the 1998 Winter Olympics consisted of three events held from 11 to 17 February, taking place at Hakuba Ski Jumping Stadium.

== Medal summary ==
=== Medal table ===
Rank	Nation	Gold	Silver	Bronze	Total
1	Japan	2	1	1	4
2	Finland	1	1	0	2
3	Germany	0	1	0	1
4	Austria	0	0	2	2
Totals (4 entries)		3	3	3	9

Japan led the medal table with two gold medals, and four overall.

=== Events ===
Event	Gold		Silver		Bronze	
Normal hill individual	Jani Soininen; Finland	234.5	Kazuyoshi Funaki; Japan	233.5	Andreas Widhölzl; Austria	232.5
Large hill individual	Kazuyoshi Funaki; Japan	272.3	Jani Soininen; Finland	260.8	Masahiko Harada; Japan	258.3
Large hill team	Japan; Takanobu Okabe; Hiroya Saito; Masahiko Harada; Kazuyoshi Funaki	933.0	Germany; Sven Hannawald; Martin Schmitt; Hansjörg Jäkle; Dieter Thoma	897.4	Austria; Reinhard Schwarzenberger; Martin Höllwarth; Stefan Horngacher; Andreas Widhölzl	881.5

== Participating NOCs ==
Nineteen nations participated in ski jumping at the Nagano Games. South Korea made their Olympic ski jumping debut.

- Austria (5)
- Belarus (2)
- Czech Republic (4)
- Finland (4)
- France (2)
- Georgia (1)
- Germany (4)
- Italy (1)
- Japan (5)
- Kazakhstan (4)
- South Korea (4)
- Norway (5)
- Poland (5)
- Russia (4)
- Slovenia (5)
- Switzerland (4)
- Slovakia (1)
- Ukraine (3)
- United States (5)
