= Masahiko Harada =

Japanese former ski jumper (born 1968)

Masahiko Harada 原田 雅彦
Personal information
- Full name: 原田 雅彦
- Nationality: Japan
- Born: 9 May 1968 (age 58) Kamikawa, Japan
- Height: 1.73 m (5 ft 8 in)

Sport
- Sport: Skiing

World Cup career
- Seasons: 1987–1988; 1990–2003
- Indiv. starts: 211
- Indiv. podiums: 21
- Indiv. wins: 9
- Team starts: 13
- Team podiums: 7
- Team wins: 3

Achievements and titles
- Personal bests: 197 m (646 ft); Planica, 18-21 March 1999
Medal record
Men's ski jumping
Olympic Games
Gold medal – first place	1998 Nagano	Team LH
Silver medal – second place	1994 Lillehammer	Team LH
Bronze medal – third place	1998 Nagano	Individual LH
FIS Nordic World Ski Championships
Gold medal – first place	1993 Falun	Individual NH
Gold medal – first place	1997 Trondheim	Individual LH
Silver medal – second place	1997 Trondheim	Individual NH
Silver medal – second place	1997 Trondheim	Team LH
Silver medal – second place	1999 Ramsau	Team LH
Bronze medal – third place	1999 Ramsau	Individual NH
- Updated on 10 February 2016

Masahiko Harada (原田 雅彦, Harada Masahiko) (born 9 May 1968) is a Japanese former ski jumper. He is best remembered for a meltdown at the 1994 Winter Olympics in Lillehammer, which cost the Japanese national team a victory, and his subsequent redemption at the 1998 Winter Olympics in Nagano; the latter of which led to him being affectionately called "Happy Harada".

== Career ==
At the 1994 games, the Japanese team had a nearly insurmountable lead heading into the last jump of the large hill. Harada, the team's anchor, had jumped 122 meters in his previous attempt and needed only 105 meters in his final jump to clinch the gold for Japan. His jump was just shy of 97,5 meters and dropped Japan to second, with the gold going to the German team.

Four years later Harada would again have his chance to contribute a gold for his team, this time in his home country. His first jump of 79.5 meters knocked his team from first to fourth and brought back memories of Lillehammer. Then, on his second attempt he delivered an Olympic-record tying 137 meter jump. His teammate Kazuyoshi Funaki would then close out the event with a 125 meter jump, clinching the first Olympic ski jumping team gold medal for Japan.

Along with the team gold, Harada also captured bronze in Nagano in the individual large hill after a 136 meter final jump that pushed him up from sixth to third.

Harada has competed in five of the Olympic Games. In addition to the Lillehammer and Nagano games, he competed in Albertville in 1992, Salt Lake City in 2002 and Turin in 2006.

He is a two-time FIS Nordic World Ski Championships winner (1993: individual normal hill, 1997: individual large hill), and also won three silvers (1997: Individual normal hill, 1997, 1999: Team large hill) and one bronze (1999: Individual normal hill) as well.

Olympic normal hill individual competition in Pragelato on 11 February 2006 was the last highly ranked official event where he participated - who won 2 Olympic medals in Nagano and 1 in Lillehammer - and it was after over 3 years break from participating in Ski jumping World Cup. Unfortunately for him, he was disqualified in the qualifying and did not compete in the final. Later he started only in FIS Cup event in Sapporo.

On July 12, 2006, Harada was appointed Ambassador to the 2007 FIS Nordic World Ski Championships in Sapporo, Japan by the organizing committee. The 2007 Championships ran February 22-March 4, 2007.

== World Cup ==
=== Standings ===
Season	Overall	4H	SF	NT	JP
1986/87	85	—	N/A	N/A	N/A
1987/88	—	80	N/A	N/A	N/A
1989/90	52	—	N/A	N/A	N/A
1990/91	—	61	—	N/A	N/A
1991/92	29	—	—	N/A	N/A
1992/93	16	6	—	N/A	N/A
1993/94	15	21	—	N/A	N/A
1994/95	59	64	—	N/A	N/A
1995/96	5	18	—	N/A	3rd place, bronze medalist(s)
1996/97	29	42	—	13	24
1997/98	4	10	21	13	2nd place, silver medalist(s)
1998/99	9	8	8	18	9
1999/00	11	6	15	53	11
2000/01	26	21	50	53	N/A
2001/02	38	31	N/A	59	N/A
2002/03	—	—	N/A	—	N/A

=== Wins ===
No.	Season	Date	Location	Hill	Size
1	1995/96	8 December 1995	(Austria) Villach	Villacher Alpenarena K90	NH
2	1995/96	18 February 1996	(United States) Iron Mountain	Pine Mountain Ski Jump K120	LH
3	1995/96	1 March 1996	(Finland) Lahti	Salpausselkä K90 (night)	NH
4	1995/96	3 March 1996	(Finland) Lahti	Salpausselkä K114	LH
5	1997/98	8 December 1997	(Austria) Villach	Villacher Alpenarena K90	NH
6	1997/98	12 December 1997	(Czech Republic) Harrachov	Čerťák K90	NH
7	1997/98	21 December 1997	(Switzerland) Engelberg	Gross-Titlis-Schanze K120	LH
8	1997/98	11 January 1998	(Austria) Ramsau	Mattenschanze K90	NH
9	1997/98	13 March 1998	(Norway) Trondheim	Granåsen K120	LH
