= Simen Berntsen =

Norwegian ski jumper (born 1976)

Personal information
- Born: 2 July 1976 (age 50)

Sport
- Sport: Skiing
- Club: Spydeberg IL

World Cup career
- Seasons: 1996-1997
- Indiv. podiums: 0
- Indiv. wins: 0

Simen Berntsen (born 2 July 1976) is a retired Norwegian ski jumper.

In the World Cup he finished once among the top 10, with a tenth place at Oslo in March 1997. He finished second overall in the Continental Cup in the 1996/97 season.
