= Dieter Thoma =

German ski jumper (born 1969)

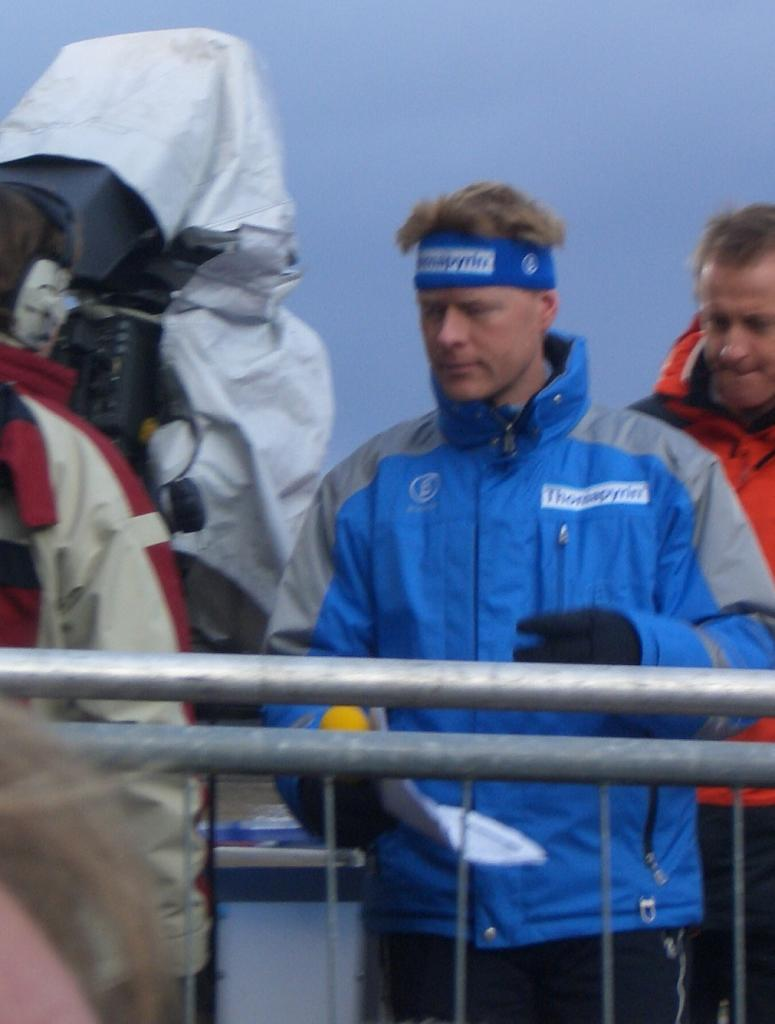

Personal information
- Nationality: West Germany (1985-90); Germany (1990-1999)
- Born: 19 October 1969 (age 56) Hinterzarten, West Germany
- Height: 1.78 m (5 ft 10 in)

Sport
- Sport: Skiing

World Cup career
- Seasons: 1986–1999
- Indiv. starts: 202
- Indiv. podiums: 36
- Indiv. wins: 12
- Team starts: 7
- Team podiums: 4
- Four Hills titles: 1 (1990)
- JP titles: 1 (1997)

Achievements and titles
- Personal bests: 211 m (692 ft); Planica, 22 March 1997
Medal record
Men's ski jumping
Olympic Games
Gold medal – first place	1994 Lillehammer	Team LH
Silver medal – second place	1998 Nagano	Team LH
Bronze medal – third place	1994 Lillehammer	Individual NH
FIS Nordic World Ski Championships
Gold medal – first place	1999 Ramsau	Team LH
Silver medal – second place	1995 Thunder Bay	Team LH
Silver medal – second place	1997 Trondheim	Individual LH
Bronze medal – third place	1991 Val di Fiemme	Team LH
Bronze medal – third place	1997 Trondheim	Team LH
Men's ski flying
FIS Ski Flying World Championships
Gold medal – first place	1990 Vikersund	Individual
Bronze medal – third place	1998 Oberstdorf	Individual
- Updated on 10 February 2016

Dieter Thoma (born 19 October 1969) is a West German/German former ski jumper.

== Career ==
During that time he was the second best German ski jumper after Jens Weißflog. Thoma was not the first known ski jumper in the family: his uncle Georg Thoma was both world and Olympic champion in the Nordic combined. Thoma won his first competition in 1990 when he won the Four Hills Tournament. He also won Ski-flying World Championships in Vikersund at the end of the 1989-90 season. Before the start of the 1993-94 season, Thoma changed his technique from jumping with parallel skis to the V-style, and was a part of the German team who won the team competition at the 1994 Winter Olympics in Lillehammer. He also won a bronze medal in the individual normal hill in Lillehammer, then won a silver medal in the team large hill competition at the 1998 Winter Olympics in Nagano. Thoma also won a bronze in the FIS Ski-Flying World Championships 1998 in Oberstdorf.

Thoma won five medals at the FIS Nordic World Ski Championships, including one gold (Team large hill: 1999), two silvers (Team large hill: 1995, Individual large hill: 1997), and two bronzes (Team large hill: 1991 and 1997).

Thoma retired after the 1998/99 season.

== World Cup ==
=== Standings ===
Season	Overall	4H	SF	NT	JP
1985/86	58	81	N/A	N/A	N/A
1986/87	—	111	N/A	N/A	N/A
1987/88	15	26	N/A	N/A	N/A
1988/89	3rd place, bronze medalist(s)	4	N/A	N/A	N/A
1989/90	4	1st place, gold medalist(s)	N/A	N/A	N/A
1990/91	3rd place, bronze medalist(s)	3rd place, bronze medalist(s)	9	N/A	N/A
1991/92	42	14	—	N/A	N/A
1992/93	42	20	—	N/A	N/A
1993/94	11	8	—	N/A	N/A
1994/95	18	13	22	N/A	N/A
1995/96	25	11	—	N/A	25
1996/97	2nd place, silver medalist(s)	3rd place, bronze medalist(s)	17	10	1st place, gold medalist(s)
1997/98	8	6	28	31	7
1998/99	10	10	21	22	10

=== Wins ===
No.	Season	Date	Location	Hill	Size
1	1988/89	3 December 1988	(Canada) Thunder Bay	Big Thunder K89	NH
2	1988/89	30 December 1988	(Germany) Oberstdorf	Schattenbergschanze K115	LH
3	1989/90	3 December 1989	(Canada) Thunder Bay	Big Thunder K120	LH
4	1989/90	30 December 1989	(Germany) Oberstdorf	Schattenbergschanze K115	LH
5	1989/90	12 January 1990	(Czechoslovakia) Harrachov	Čerťák K120	LH
6	1990/91	16 December 1990	(Japan) Sapporo	Ōkurayama K115	LH
7	1990/91	12 January 1991	(Germany) Oberhof	Hans-Renner-Schanze K120	LH
8	1996/97	30 November 1996	(Norway) Lillehammer	Lysgårdsbakken K120 (night)	LH
9	1996/97	29 December 1996	(Germany) Oberstdorf	Schattenbergschanze K115	LH
10	1996/97	6 January 1997	(Austria) Bischofshofen	Paul-Ausserleitner-Schanze K120	LH
11	1996/97	19 January 1997	(Japan) Sapporo	Ōkurayama K120	LH
12	1997/98	29 November 1997	(Norway) Lillehammer	Lysgårdsbakken K120 (night)	LH

== Invalid ski jumping world record ==
Date	Hill	Location	Metres	Feet
22 March 1997	Velikanka bratov Gorišek K185	Planica, Slovenia	213	699

Not recognized! Crash at world record distance.
