= Lugnet Hills =

Ski jumping hill in Falun, Sweden

Coordinates: 60.6211°N 15.6653°E

Lugnet
- Svenska Skidspelen
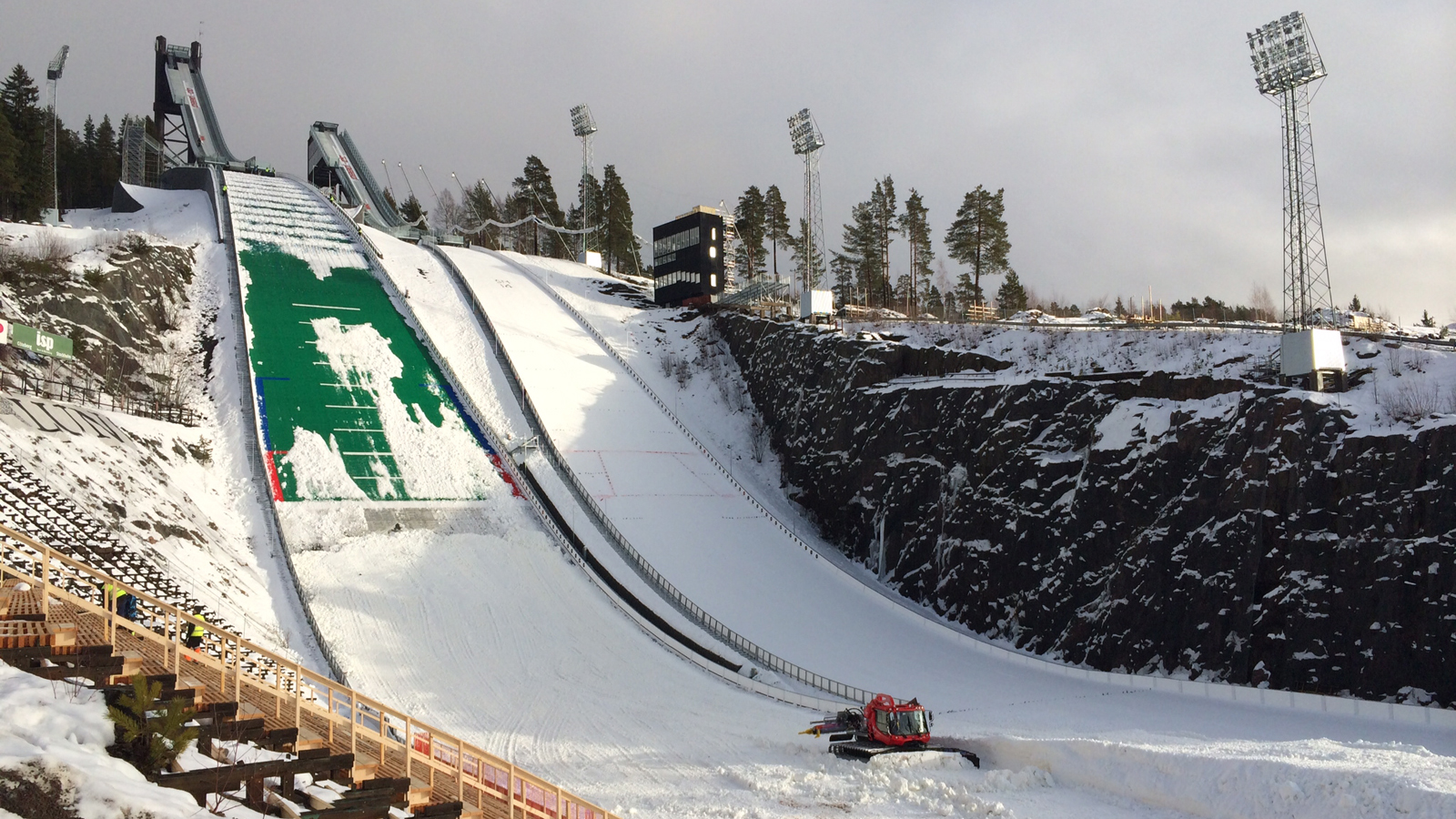
- Location: Falun; Sweden
- Opened: 1974
- Renovated: 2012-2013

Size
- K–point: K-90; K-120
- Hill size: HS100; HS134
- Hill record: (Slovenia) Primož Peterka (105.0 m in 1996) (Germany) Severin Freund (135.5 m in 2015)

Top events
- World Championships: 1954, 1974, 1980, 1993, 2015, 2027

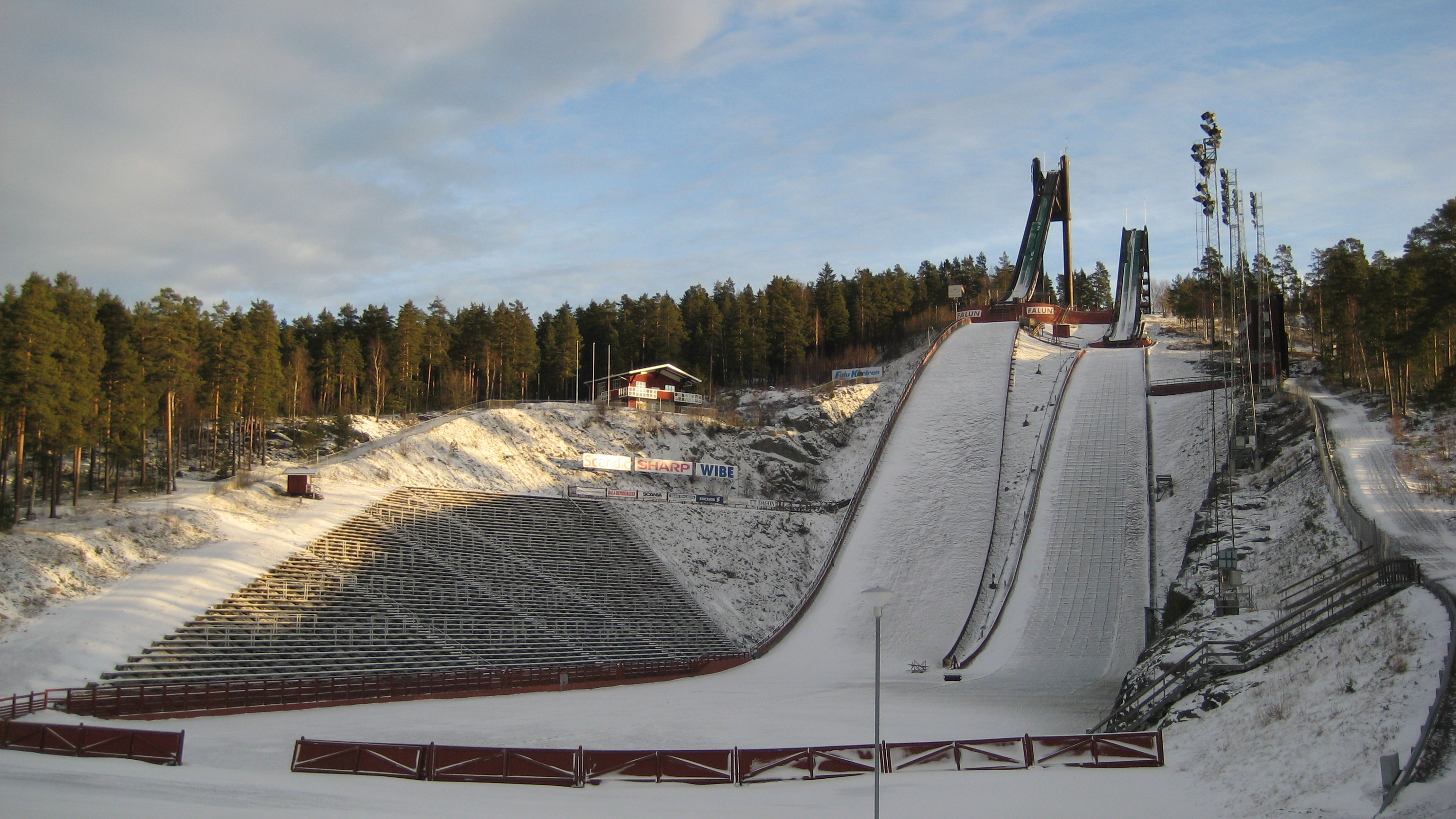
Old Lugnet Hills

Lugnet HS134 is a large ski jumping hill located in Falun, Sweden. It has a hill size of HS134, a construction point of K-120. The hill has artificial lighting and bleachers for 15,000 viewers. Hill size has been increased from K-115, HS124 to K-120, HS134. The hill was built specifically for the World Cup Ski Championships in 1974. Last modernization took place from August 2012 to end of 2013 because of the preparations for the 2015 FIS Nordic World Ski Championships.

== Hill record ==
Before the recent modernization, the hill record belonged to Matti Hautamäki, who jumped 130.5 metres. On 26 February 2015, Severin Freund set the current hill record of 135.5 metres.

Lp.	Day	Year	Competitor	Jump	Competition	Attention
1.	February 23	1974	(East Germany) Hans-Georg Aschenbach	104.0 m	World Championships 1974	
2.	February 23	1974	(Czechoslovakia) Karel Kodejška	104.0 m	World Championships 1974	alignment record
3.	March 8	1985	(Austria) Andreas Felder	115.5 m	World Cup	
4.	December 6	1992	(Norway) Lasse Ottesen	116.5 m	World Cup	
5.	February 21	1993	(Norway) Espen Bredesen	125.5 m	World Championships 1993	
6.	March 11	1998	(Slovenia) Primož Peterka	128.0 m	World Cup	
7.	March 13	2002	(Finland) Matti Hautamäki	130.5 m	World Cup	
8.	February 25	2014	(Poland) Kamil Stoch	129.5 m	World Cup	record after modernization in 2013
9.	February 26	2014	(Switzerland) Simon Ammann	129.5 m	World Cup	alignment record
10.	February 26	2014	(Germany) Severin Freund	133.0 m	World Cup	
11.	February 26	2014	(Japan) Noriaki Kasai	133.0 m	World Cup	alignment record
12.	February 26	2014	(Poland) Kamil Stoch	134.5 m	World Cup	
13.	February 26	2014	(Germany) Severin Freund	135.0 m	World Cup	
14.	February 25	2015	(Norway) Rune Velta	135.0 m	World Championships 2015	alignment record
15.	February 26	2015	(Germany) Severin Freund	135.5 m	World Cup	
