= Håvard Lie =

Norwegian ski jumper (born 1975)

Personal information
- Born: 21 May 1975 (age 51)

Sport
- Sport: Skiing
- Club: Byåsen IL

World Cup career
- Seasons: 1995-2003
- Indiv. podiums: 0
- Indiv. wins: 0

Håvard Lie (born 21 May 1975) is a Norwegian former ski jumper.

In the World Cup, he finished 3 times among the top 10.

At the 1997 FIS Nordic World Ski Championships he finished 28th in the normal hill and only 9th in the large hill.
