= Hiroya Saitō =

Japanese ski jumper (born 1970)

Hiroya Saito 斉藤浩哉
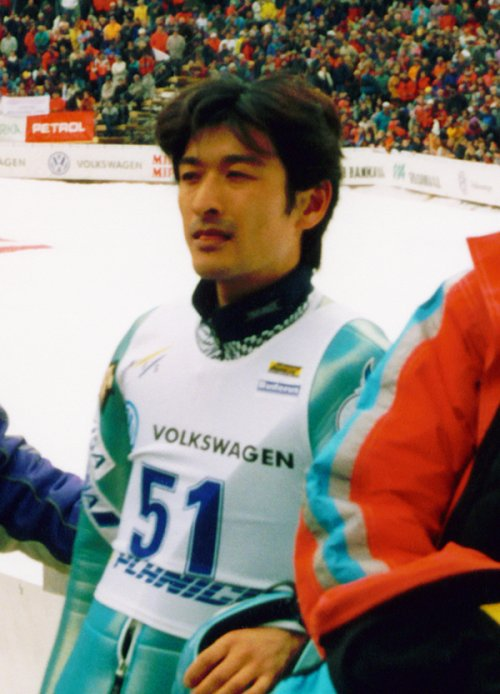

Personal information
- Full name: 斉藤浩哉
- Nationality: Japan
- Born: 1 September 1970 (age 55) Yoichi, Hokkaidō, Japan
- Height: 173 cm (5 ft 8 in)

Sport
- Sport: Skiing

World Cup career
- Seasons: 1992–2000; 2002
- Indiv. starts: 147
- Indiv. podiums: 16
- Indiv. wins: 2
- Team starts: 7
- Team podiums: 3
- Team wins: 1

Achievements and titles
- Personal bests: 188.5 m (618 ft); Planica, 21-23 March 1997
Medal record
Men's ski jumping
Olympic Games
Gold medal – first place	1998 Nagano	Team LH
FIS Nordic World Ski Championships
Silver medal – second place	1995 Thunder Bay	Individual NH
Silver medal – second place	1997 Trondheim	Team LH
Bronze medal – third place	1995 Thunder Bay	Team LH
- Updated on 10 February 2016

Hiroya Saito (斉藤浩哉, Saitō Hiroya) (born 1 September 1970) is a Japanese former ski jumper.

== Career ==
He competed from 1991 to 2002. He won a gold medal at the 1998 Winter Olympics in Nagano in the Team large hill event. Saito is a three-time FIS Nordic World Ski Championships medalist with two silvers (1995: Individual normal hill and 1997: Team large hill) and one bronze (1995: Team large hill).

== World Cup ==
=== Standings ===
Season	Overall	4H	SF	NT	JP
1991/92	—	—	—	N/A	N/A
1992/93	—	—	—	N/A	N/A
1993/94	42	20	—	N/A	N/A
1994/95	27	76	29	N/A	N/A
1995/96	8	4	24	N/A	7
1996/97	5	5	14	19	3rd place, bronze medalist(s)
1997/98	5	13	10	3rd place, bronze medalist(s)	6
1998/99	23	23	—	—	21
1999/00	20	33	19	31	22
2001/02	60	—	N/A	—	N/A

=== Wins ===
No.	Season	Date	Location	Hill	Size
1	1995/96	17 December 1995	(France) Chamonix	Le Mont K95	NH
2	1996/97	2 February 1997	(Germany) Willingen	Mühlenkopfschanze K120	LH
