= Kazuyoshi Funaki =

Japanese ski jumper (born 1975)

Kazuyoshi Funaki 船木 和喜
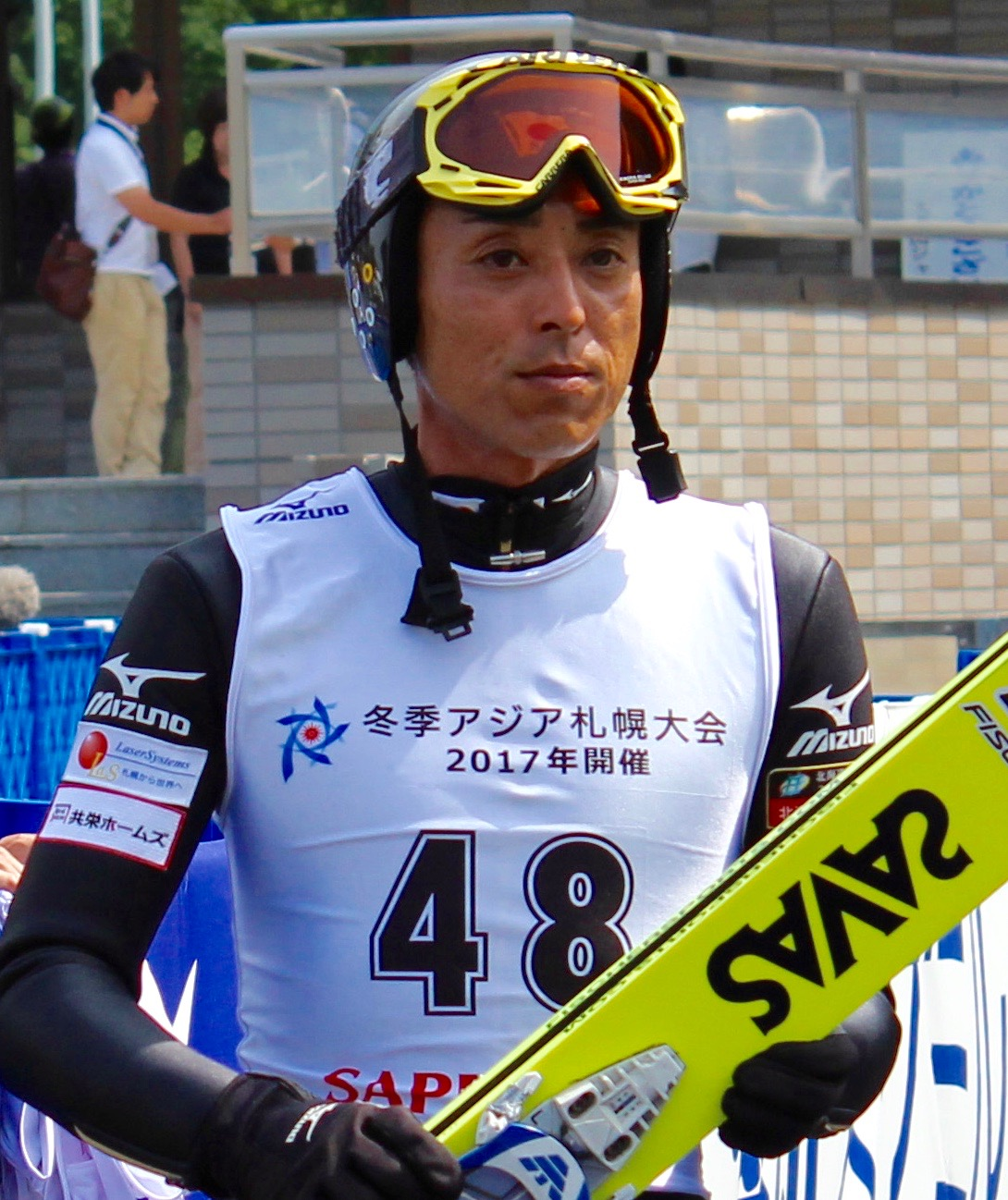
- Funaki at the 2014 Okurayama Summer Ski Jumping Championship

Personal information
- Full name: 船木 和喜
- Nationality: Japan
- Born: 27 April 1975 (age 51) Yoichi, Hokkaido, Japan
- Height: 1.75 m (5 ft 9 in)

Sport
- Sport: Skiing
- Club: Fit Ski

World Cup career
- Seasons: 1993; 1995–2005; 2009–2012
- Indiv. starts: 238
- Indiv. podiums: 38
- Indiv. wins: 15
- Team starts: 17
- Team podiums: 7
- Team wins: 2
- Four Hills titles: 1 (1998)
- Nordic titles: 1 (1997)

Achievements and titles
- Personal bests: 206.5 m (677 ft); Planica, 19 March 1999
Medal record
Men's ski jumping
Event	1st	2nd	3rd
Olympic Games	2	1	0
World Championships	1	3	0
Ski Flying World Championships	1	0	0
Total	2	5	0
Olympic Games
Gold medal – first place	1998 Nagano	Individual LH
Gold medal – first place	1998 Nagano	Team LH
Silver medal – second place	1998 Nagano	Individual NH
World Championships
Gold medal – first place	1999 Ramsau	Individual NH
Silver medal – second place	1997 Trondheim	Team LH
Silver medal – second place	1999 Ramsau	Team LH
Silver medal – second place	2003 Val di Fiemme	Team LH
Men's ski flying
World Championships
Gold medal – first place	1998 Oberstdorf	Individual
- Updated on 10 February 2016

Kazuyoshi Funaki (船木 和喜, Funaki Kazuyoshi) (born 27 April 1975) is a Japanese former ski jumper. He ranked among the most successful sportsmen of its discipline, particularly in the 1990s. Funaki is known for his special variant of the V-style, in which the body lies flatter between the skis than usual.

== Career ==
Funaki began ski jumping at the age of eleven. His birthplace Yoichi is also the home of Yukio Kasaya, who was a Japanese national hero with his Normal Hill victory in the 1972 Winter Olympics at Sapporo. Kasaya was also Funaki's role model.

Funaki had his first World Cup appearance on December 20, 1992 in Sapporo. His first World Cup victory was achieved on December 10, 1994 in the normal hill at Planica, Slovenia. Several weeks later, he was leading the Four Hills Tournament in total tour points after the third event. In the second part of the last event at Bischofshofen, he had the longest jump of 131.5 meters, but fell during the landing - and the overall tour victory went to Austrian Andreas Goldberger, and Funaki finished second.

Altogether Funaki won 15 World Cup career victories, his last on February 5, 2005 at Sapporo. He achieved his best results in the 1997/98 season with a second rank in the World Cup rankings. In that season he also won the Four Hills Tournament.

In 1997, Funaki won the ski jumping event at the Holmenkollen ski festival. He also won the FIS Ski-Flying World Championships 1998 in Oberstdorf.

The high point of his career was in the 1998 Winter Olympic Games at Nagano. In front of his local crowd, Funaki won the individual gold medal on the individual large Hill, which was the first Olympic ski jumping gold for Japan since 1972, the team large hill gold medal, and the individual normal hill silver medal behind the Finn Jani Soininen. During those games, he became only the second person to ever achieve perfect marks from all five judges (20 points is the highest attainable mark), following Toni Innauer who had achieved this masterpiece already in 1976 and preceding Sven Hannawald (2003), Hideharu Miyahira (2003) and Wolfgang Loitzl (2009). In honor of these achievements, he represented Asia in carrying the Olympic Flag during the opening ceremonies of the next Winter Olympics, in Salt Lake City.

At the FIS Nordic World Ski Championships, he became the world champion of the individual normal hill in 1999 at Ramsau, Austria. And together with the Japanese team, he placed 2nd in the Team large hill in 1997, 1999 and 2003.

For his ski jumping successes, Funaki received the Holmenkollen medal in 1999.

While he does not compete in World Cup or Continental Cup events, Funaki still takes part in local Japanese competitions. In March 2019 he finished 10th and 42nd in FIS Race events in Sapporo.

== World Cup ==
=== Standings ===
Season	Overall	4H	SF	NT	JP
1992/93	—	—	—	N/A	N/A
1994/95	4	2nd place, silver medalist(s)	7	N/A	N/A
1995/96	33	28	19	N/A	39
1996/97	3rd place, bronze medalist(s)	10	3rd place, bronze medalist(s)	1st place, gold medalist(s)	4
1997/98	2nd place, silver medalist(s)	1st place, gold medalist(s)	2nd place, silver medalist(s)	8	4
1998/99	4	5	4	2nd place, silver medalist(s)	3rd place, bronze medalist(s)
1999/00	14	13	9	14	13
2000/01	30	46	40	—	N/A
2001/02	11	25	N/A	9	N/A
2002/03	30	33	N/A	34	N/A
2003/04	40	44	N/A	39	N/A
2004/05	30	52	N/A	57	N/A
2008/09	63	—	—	—	N/A
2009/10	—	—	—	—	N/A
2010/11	58	—	—	N/A	N/A
2011/12	—	—	—	N/A	N/A

=== Wins ===
No.	Season	Date	Location	Hill	Size
1	1994/95	10 December 1994	(Slovenia) Planica	Srednja Bloudkova K90	NH
2	1994/95	4 January 1995	(Austria) Innsbruck	Bergiselschanze K110	LH
3	1996/97	14 December 1996	(Czech Republic) Harrachov	Čerťák K120	LH
4	1996/97	4 January 1997	(Austria) Innsbruck	Bergiselschanze K110	LH
5	1996/97	12 March 1997	(Finland) Kuopio	Puijo K95 (night)	NH
6	1996/97	14 March 1997	(Norway) Oslo	Holmenkollbakken K112	LH
7	1997/98	29 December 1997	(Germany) Oberstdorf	Schattenbergschanze K115	LH
8	1997/98	1 January 1998	(Germany) Garmisch-Partenkirchen	Große Olympiaschanze K115	LH
9	1997/98	4 January 1998	(Austria) Innsbruck	Bergiselschanze K110	LH
10	1997/98	25 January 1998	(Germany) Oberstdorf	Heini-Klopfer-Skiflugschanze K185	FH
11	1997/98	21 March 1998	(Slovenia) Planica	Bloudkova velikanka K120	LH
12	1998/99	10 January 1999	(Switzerland) Engelberg	Gross-Titlis-Schanze K120	LH
13	1998/99	24 January 1999	(Japan) Sapporo	Ōkurayama K120	LH
14	1998/99	6 March 1999	(Finland) Lahti	Salpausselkä K90 (night)	NH
15	2004/05	5 February 2005	(Japan) Sapporo	Ōkurayama HS134 (night)	LH

== See also ==
- List of multiple Olympic gold medalists at a single Games
