= Kristian Brenden =

Norwegian former ski jumper

Personal information
- Nationality: Norway
- Born: 12 June 1976 (age 50) Lillehammer, Norway
- Height: 1.88 m (6 ft 2 in)

Sport
- Sport: Skiing

World Cup career
- Seasons: 1996–2001
- Indiv. starts: 78
- Indiv. podiums: 8
- Indiv. wins: 2
- Team starts: 1

Achievements and titles
- Personal bests: 204.5 m (671 ft); Planica, 17-19 March 1999
- Updated on 10 February 2016

Kristian Brenden (born 12 June 1976) is a Norwegian former ski jumper.

== Career ==
In the World Cup he finished 29 times among the top 10 and on the podium 8 times. He won the competitions in December 1996 in Lillehammer and in January 1998 in Zakopane.

He participated in the 1998 Winter Olympics in Nagano, where he finished 8th in the normal hill, 13th in the large hill and 4th in the team event. At the 1999 FIS Nordic World Ski Championships he finished 14th in the normal hill and 17th in the large hill.

== World Cup ==
=== Standings ===
Season	Overall	4H	SF	NT	JP
1995/96	84	—	—	N/A	81
1996/97	7	11	19	2	5
1997/98	12	32	8	22	14
1998/99	22	17	7	44	22
1999/00	—	—	—	—	—
2000/01	61	—	35	—	N/A

=== Wins ===
No.	Season	Date	Location	Hill	Size
1	1996/97	1 December 1996	(Norway) Lillehammer	Lysgårdsbakken K120 (night)	LH
2	1997/98	17 January 1998	(Poland) Zakopane	Wielka Krokiew K116	LH
