= Jani Soininen =

Finnish ski jumper

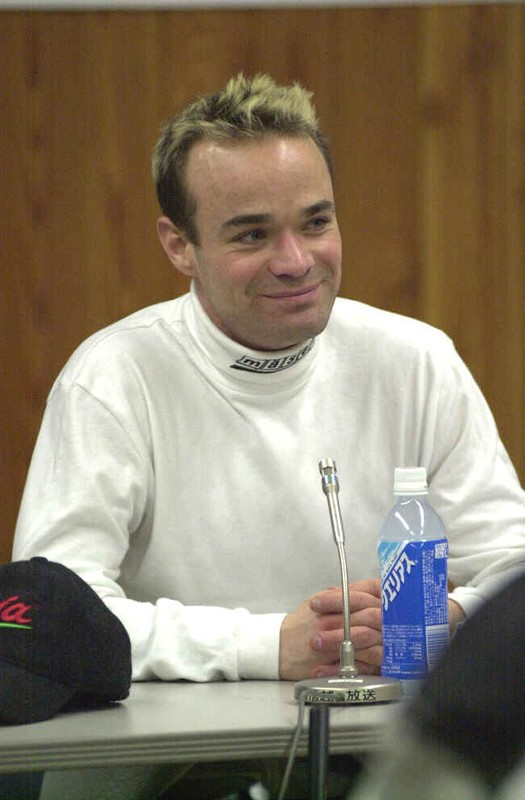

Personal information
- Full name: Jani Markus Soininen
- Nationality: Finland
- Born: 12 November 1972 (age 53) Jyväskylä, Finland
- Height: 171 cm (5 ft 7 in)

Sport
- Sport: Skiing

World Cup career
- Seasons: 1992–2001
- Indiv. starts: 196
- Indiv. podiums: 18
- Indiv. wins: 4
- Team starts: 13
- Team podiums: 10
- Team wins: 7

Achievements and titles
- Personal bests: 203.5 m (668 ft); Planica, 21-23 March 1997
Medal record
Men's ski jumping
Olympic Games
Gold medal – first place	1998 Nagano	Individual NH
Silver medal – second place	1998 Nagano	Individual LH
FIS Nordic World Ski Championships
Gold medal – first place	1995 Thunder Bay	Team LH
Gold medal – first place	1997 Trondheim	Team LH
Silver medal – second place	2001 Lahti	Team LH
- Updated on 10 February 2016

Jani Markus Soininen (born 12 November 1972) is a Finnish former ski jumper.

== Career ==
He won two medals at the 1998 Winter Olympics in Nagano, earning a gold in the individual normal hill and a silver in the individual large hill. His biggest successes were at the FIS Nordic World Ski Championships, where he earned three medals in the team hill competitions with gold in 1995 and 1997, and silver in 2001 on the large hill.

== World Cup ==
=== Standings ===
Season	Overall	4H	SF	NT	JP
1991/92	—	—	—	N/A	N/A
1992/93	39	45	—	N/A	N/A
1993/94	14	18	9	N/A	N/A
1994/95	7	6	—	N/A	N/A
1995/96	11	9	11	N/A	11
1996/97	9	9	8	12	10
1997/98	7	5	20	17	5
1998/99	35	25	37	32	33
1999/00	7	10	20	12	7
2000/01	10	14	14	42	N/A

=== Wins ===
No.	Season	Date	Location	Hill	Size
1	1995/96	13 January 1996	(Switzerland) Engelberg	Gross-Titlis-Schanze K120	LH
2	1997/98	30 November 1997	(Norway) Lillehammer	Lysgårdsbakken K120 (night)	LH
3	1997/98	6 December 1997	(Italy) Predazzo	Trampolino dal Ben K90 (night)	NH
4	1999/00	26 January 2000	(Japan) Hakuba	Olympic Hills K120 (night)	LH
