= Bruno Reuteler =

Swiss ski jumper

Bruno Reuteler (born 2 April 1971 in Saanen) was a Swiss ski jumper who competed from 1992 to 2000. At the 1998 Winter Olympics in Nagano, he finished sixth in the team large hill and 18th in the individual normal hill events.

Reuteler's best finish at the FIS Nordic World Ski Championships was 17th in the large hill event at Trondheim in 1997. He also finished 17th at the 1998 Ski-flying World Championships in Oberstdorf.

Reuteler's best World Cup finish was second in Norway in 1998.
