= 1993–94 FIS Ski Jumping Continental Cup =

Ski-jumping competition series

FIS Continental Cup 1993/94
Winners
- Overall: (Germany) Ralph Gebstedt

Competitions
- Venues: 24
- Individual: 33

The 1993/94 FIS Ski Jumping Continental Cup was the 3rd in a row (1st official) Continental Cup winter season in ski jumping for men. Europa Cup was a predecessor of Continental Cup.

Other competitive circuits this season included the World Cup season.

== Men's Individual ==
Individual events in the CC history

Total	F	L	N	Winners
76	2	26	48	54

after normal hill event in Rovaniemi (26 March 1994)

=== Calendar ===
All	No.	Date	Place (Hill)	Size	Winner	Second	Third
44	1	3 December 1993	(Norway) Lillehammer (Lysgårdsbakken K120/90)	L _{014}	(Norway) Espen Bredesen	(Czech Republic) Jaroslav Sakala	(Germany) Jens Weißflog
45	2	5 December 1993	(Norway) Lillehammer (Lysgårdsbakken K120/90)	N _{031}	(Japan) Hiroya Saitō	(Norway) Espen Bredesen	(Austria) Andreas Goldberger
46	3	11 December 1993	(Germany) Oberwiesenthal (Fichtelbergschanzen K90)	N _{032}	(Austria) Andreas Beck	(Czech Republic) Jiří Raška jr.	(Finland) Tero Koponen
47	4	12 December 1993	(Germany) Lauscha (Marktiegelschanze K90)	N _{033}	(Finland) Olli Happonen	(Germany) Ralph Gebstedt	(Czech Republic) Jiří Raška jr.
48	5	19 December 1993	(Austria) Wörgl (Latella-Schanze K83)	N _{034}	(Austria) Andreas Beck (Norway) Hakon Johnsen		(Japan) Kenji Suda (Kazakhstan) Dionis Vodnev
49	6	26 December 1993	(Switzerland) St. Moritz (Olympiaschanze K95)	N _{035}	(Germany) Dieter Thoma	(Japan) Hiroya Saitō	(Switzerland) Sylvain Freiholz
50	7	29 December 1993	(Austria) St. Aegyd (Klaushoferschanze K73)	N _{036}	(Austria) Klaus Huber	(Austria) Christian Moser	(Austria) Gerhard Schallert
51	8	9 January 1994	(Italy) Gallio (Trampolino di Pakstall K92)	N _{037}	(France) Nicolas Jean-Prost	(Germany) Ronny Hornschuh	(Austria) Gerhard Schallert
52	9	15 January 1994	(Japan) Sapporo (Miyanomori K90) (Ōkurayama K115)	N _{038}	(Japan) Masahiko Harada	(Japan) Takanobu Okabe	(Japan) Jin'ya Nishikata
53	10	16 January 1994	(Japan) Sapporo (Miyanomori K90) (Ōkurayama K115)	L _{015}	(Japan) Takanobu Okabe	(Japan) Hitoshi Sakurai	(Japan) Masahiko Harada
54	11	22 January 1994	(Germany) Willingen (Mühlenkopfschanze K120)	L _{016}	(Norway) Stein Henrik Tuff	(Germany) Ralph Gebstedt	(Norway) Clas-Brede Bråthen
55	12	22 January 1994	(United States) Ironwood (Copper Peak K145)	F _{001}	(Norway) Terje Nyhus	(Austria) Werner Schuster	(Austria) Matthias Wallner
56	13	23 January 1994	(Germany) Willingen (Mühlenkopfschanze K120)	L _{017}	(Norway) Stein Henrik Tuff	(Germany) Ralph Gebstedt	(Germany) Hansjörg Jäkle
57	14	24 January 1994	(United States) Ironwood (Copper Peak K145)	F _{002}	(Austria) Matthias Wallner	(Austria) Werner Schuster	(Norway) Frode Håre
58	15	11 February 1994	(Germany) Ruhpolding (Große Zirmbergschanze K107) (Note: Not clear if Große Zirmbergschanze hill in Ruhpolding had K-point at K107 or K110 at that time.)	L _{018}	(Germany) Sven Hannawald	(Austria) Andreas Beck	(Norway) Clas-Brede Bråthen
59	16	12 February 1994	(Austria) Saalfelden (Bibergschanze K85)	N _{039}	(Switzerland) Stephan Zünd	(Austria) Klaus Huber	(France) Steve Delaup
60	17	13 February 1994	(Slovenia) Planica (Bloudkova velikanka K120)	L _{019}	(Austria) Andreas Beck	(Norway) Clas-Brede Bråthen	(Norway) Hein-Arne Mathiesen
5th Alps-Adria Tournament (11 – 13 February 1994)					(Austria) Andreas Beck	(Norway) Clas Brede Bråthen	(Austria) Klaus Huber
61	18	19 February 1994	(United States) Iron Mountain (Pine Mountain Ski Jump K120)	L _{020}	(Germany) Ralph Gebstedt	(Switzerland) Stephan Zünd	(Austria) Martin Höllwarth
62	19	20 February 1994	(United States) Iron Mountain (Pine Mountain Ski Jump K120)	L _{021}	(Finland) Sami Nieminen	(Switzerland) Stephan Zünd	(Czech Republic) Jakub Sucháček
1994 Winter Olympics (20 – 25 February • (Norway) Lillehammer)
63	20	26 February 1994	(Germany) Schönwald (Adlerschanzen Schönwald K84)	N _{040}	(Austria) Klaus Huber	(Austria) Andreas Rauschmeier	(Finland) Pekka Niemelä
64	21	26 February 1994	(United States) Ishpeming (Suicide Hill K90)	N _{041}	(Austria) Martin Höllwarth	(Germany) Ronny Hornschuh	(Austria) Christian Samitz
65	22	27 February 1994	(Germany) Titisee-Neustadt (Hochfirstschanze K112) (Note: Not clear if Hochfirstschanze hill in Titisee-Neustadt had K-point at K112 or K113 at that time.)	L _{022}	(Norway) Kurt Børset	(Germany) Christof Duffner	(Switzerland) Sepp Zehnder
23rd Schwarzwald Tournament Overall (26 – 27 February 1994)					(Switzerland) Sepp Zehnder	(Austria) Klaus Huber	(Finland) Jarkko Saapunki
		(Note: Event in Kuopio (2 March) by skijump-db.net does not provide the competition results, while a second source indicates that the competition was not intended to be counted towards the general classification. Winner was Ari-Pekka Nikkola, with Janne Ahonen and Jani Soininen tied for 2nd place.)2 March 1994	(Finland) Kuopio (Puijo K90)	N _{unr}	unclear status with no reliable data sources available		
		5 March 1994	(Japan) Sapporo (Ōkurayama K115)	L _{unr}	unclear status with no reliable data sources available		
66	23	5 March 1994	(Canada) Calgary (Alberta Ski Jump K89)	N _{042}	(Canada) John Lockyer	(Austria) Werner Schuster	(Austria) Christian Samitz
67	24	6 March 1994	(Canada) Calgary (Alberta Ski Jump K89)	N _{043}	(Austria) Werner Schuster	(Slovenia) Rok Polajnar	(Italy) Virginio Lunardi
68	25	9 March 1994	(Japan) Zaō (Yamagata K85)	N _{044}	(Austria) Andreas Widhölzl	(Austria) R. Schwarzenberger	(Japan) Hiroki Uesugi
69	26	(Note: By one source large hill event on Wielka Krokiew in Zakopane actually took place on 10 March (not on 9 March))9 March 1994	(Poland) Zakopane (Wielka Krokiew K116)	L _{023}	(Germany) Ronny Hornschuh	(Germany) Rico Meinel	(Austria) Ingemar Mayr
		(Note: Event in Zaō (10 March) by skijump-db.net does not provide the competition results, while another source indicates that the competition was not intended to be counted towards the general classification. Winner was Andreas Widhölzl, with Masahiro Yamada in second place and Jun Shibuya in third.)10 March 1994	(Japan) Zaō (Yamagata K85)	N _{unr}	unclear status with no reliable data sources available (most likely counted only for Japanese NHK Cup)		
70	27	(Note: By one source normal hill event on Średnia Krokiew in Zakopane actually took place on 9 March (not on 10 March))10 March 1994	(Poland) Zakopane (Średnia Krokiew K85)	N _{045}	(Poland) Wojciech Skupień	(Slovenia) Damjan Fras	(Slovakia) Vladimír Roško
71	28	12 March 1994	(Slovakia) Štrbské Pleso (MS 1970 A K120)	L _{024}	(Switzerland) Christof Birchler	(Germany) Rico Meinel	(Czech Republic) Tomáš Goder
72	29	13 March 1994	(Slovakia) Štrbské Pleso (MS 1970 A K120)	L _{025}	(Poland) Wojciech Skupień	(Germany) Sven Hannawald	(Czech Republic) Tomáš Goder
73	30	17 March 1994	(Norway) Sprova (Steinfjellbakken K85)	N _{046}	(Norway) Kjell Erik Sagbakken	(France) Steve Delaup	(Norway) Ove Vik Bard
74	31	19 March 1994	(Norway) Sprova (Steinfjellbakken K85)	N _{047}	(Austria) Klaus Huber	(Germany) Ronny Hornschuh (Norway) Stein Henrik Tuff	
FIS World Cup 1993/94 = FIS Ski Flying World Championships 1994 (19 – 20 March • (Slovenia) Planica)
75	32	26 March 1994	(Finland) Kuusamo (Rukatunturi K120)	L _{026}	(Finland) Risto Jussilainen	(Austria) Adolf Grugger	(Finland) Jani Mattila
76	33	26 March 1994	(Finland) Rovaniemi (Ounasvaara K90)	N _{048}	(Finland) Risto Jussilainen	(Norway) Kjell Erik Sagbakken	(Finland) Vesa Hakala
3rd FIS Continental Cup Overall (3 December 1993 – 26 March 1994)					(Germany) Ralph Gebstedt	(Germany) Ronny Hornschuh	(Austria) Klaus Huber

== Standings ==
=== Overall ===
Rank	after 33 events	Points
1	(Germany) Ralph Gebstedt	666
2	(Germany) Ronny Hornschuh	619
3	(Austria) Klaus Huber	575
4	(Austria) Werner Schuster	527
5	(Austria) Andreas Beck	465
6	(Austria) Matthias Wallner	425
7	(Austria) Adolf Grugger	407
8	(Austria) Martin Höllwarth	393
9	(Germany) Rico Meinel	378
10	(Norway) Clas Brede Bråthen	357

== Europa Cup vs. Continental Cup ==
- Last two Europa Cup seasons (1991/92 and 1992/93) are recognized as first two Continental Cup seasons by International Ski Federation (FIS), although Continental Cup under this name officially started first season in 1993/94 season.

== See also ==
- 1993–94 FIS World Cup
