= 1994–95 FIS Ski Jumping Continental Cup =

Ski-jumping competition series

FIS Continental Cup 1994/95
Winners
- Overall: (Finland) Olli Happonen

Competitions
- Venues: 24
- Individual: 39

The 1994/95 FIS Ski Jumping Continental Cup was the 4th in a row (2nd official) Continental Cup winter season in ski jumping for men. Europa Cup was a predecessor of Continental Cup.

Other competitive circuits this season included the World Cup and Grand Prix.

== Men's Individual ==
Individual events in the CC history

Total	F	L	N	Winners
115	2	39	74	74

after normal hill event in Rovaniemi (9 April 1995)

=== Calendar ===
All	No.	Date	Place (Hill)	Size	Winner	Second	Third	R.
77	1	3 December 1994	(Norway) Lillehammer (Lysgårdsbakken K90/120) (Note: Not clear if Lysgårdsbakken large hill in Lillehammer had K-point at K120 or K123 at that time.)	N _{049}	(Norway) Lasse Ottesen	(Japan) Kazuyoshi Funaki	(Norway) Espen Bredesen	
78	2	4 December 1994	(Norway) Lillehammer (Lysgårdsbakken K90/120)	L _{027}	(Italy) Roberto Cecon	(Norway) Lasse Ottesen	(Japan) Kazuyoshi Funaki	
79	3	15 December 1994	(Finland) Jyväskylä (Matti Nykäsen Mäki K90) (Note: Not clear if Matti Nykäsen Mäki hill in Jyväskylä had K-point at K100 or K90 at that time.)	N _{050}	(Finland) Jani Soininen	(Finland) Tero Turkki	(Japan) Naoto Itō	
80	4	17 December 1994	(Finland) Lahti (Salpausselkä K114/90) (Note: Not clear if Salpausselkä large hill in Lahti had K-point at K114 or K116 at that time.)	L _{028}	(Austria) Andreas Goldberger	(Japan) Kazuyoshi Funaki	(France) Nicolas Jean-Prost	
81	5	18 December 1994	(Finland) Lahti (Salpausselkä K114/90)	N _{051}	(Japan) Kazuyoshi Funaki	(Finland) Janne Ahonen	(Austria) Andreas Goldberger	
82	6	26 December 1994	(Switzerland) St. Moritz (Olympiaschanze K95)	N _{052}	(Germany) Stefan Siebert	(Switzerland) Sylvain Freiholz	(Norway) Kjetil Moen	
83	7	31 December 1994	(United States) Lake Placid (MacKenzie Intervale K120/90)	L _{029}	(Norway) Knut Müller	(Austria) Richard Foldl	(United States) Randy Weber	
84	8	1 January 1995	(United States) Lake Placid (MacKenzie Intervale K120/90)	N _{053}	(Norway) Knut Müller	(Finland) Risto Jussilainen	(Finland) Vesa Hakala	
85	9	7 January 1995	(Slovenia) Planica (Srednja Bloudkova K92) (Note: Not clear if Srednja Bloudkova large hill in Planica had K-point at K90 or K92 at that time.) (Bloudkova velikanka K120)	N _{054}	(Germany) Sven Hannawald	(Austria) Heinz Kuttin	(Norway) Kent Johanssen	
86	10	8 January 1995	(Slovenia) Planica (Srednja Bloudkova K92) (Bloudkova velikanka K120)	L _{030}	(Germany) Ronny Hornschuh	(Germany) Sven Hannawald	(France) Didier Mollard	
87	11	14 January 1995	(Japan) Sapporo (Ōkurayama K115)	L _{031}	(Japan) Kazuyoshi Funaki	(Japan) Takanobu Okabe	(Japan) Jin’ya Nishikata	
88	12	14 January 1995	(France) Courchevel (Tremplin du Praz K90)	N _{055}	(Slovenia) Primož Kopač	(France) Jérôme Gay	(Austria) Andreas Beck	
89	13	15 January 1995	(Japan) Sapporo (Ōkurayama K115)	L _{032}	(Japan) Kazuyoshi Funaki	(Japan) Keisuke Sugiyama	(Japan) Naoto Itō	
90	14	15 January 1995	(France) Courchevel (Tremplin du Praz K120)	L _{033}	(France) Lucas Chevalier-Girod (France) Jérôme Gay		(Czech Republic) Jakub Jiroutek	
91	15	16 January 1995	(Japan) Sapporo (Miyanomori K90)	N _{056}	(Japan) Naoki Yasuzaki	(Japan) Jin’ya Nishikata	(Japan) Takanobu Okabe	
92	16	20 January 1995	(Slovakia) Štrbské Pleso (MS 1970 B K90)	N _{057}	(Austria) Martin Höllwarth	(Czech Republic) František Jež	(Austria) Andreas Beck	
93	17	21 January 1995	(Poland) Zakopane (Średnia Krokiew K85)	N _{058}	(Czech Republic) František Jež	(Austria) Christian Samitz	(Finland) Tero Turkki	
94	18	21 January 1995	(Italy) Gallio (Trampolino di Pakstall K92) (Note: Not clear if Trampolino di Pakstall hill in Gallio had K-point at K92 or K95 at that time.)	N _{059}	(Austria) R. Schwarzenberger	(France) Lucas Chevalier-Girod	(Austria) Werner Schernthaner	
95	19	22 January 1995	(Poland) Zakopane (Wielka Krokiew K116)	L _{034}	(Norway) Arve Vorvik	(Finland) Olli Happonen	(Czech Republic) František Jež	
96	20	22 January 1995	(Italy) Gallio (Trampolino di Pakstall K92)	N _{060}	(Italy) Roberto Cecon	(Austria) R. Schwarzenberger	(France) Lucas Chevalier-Girod	
97	21	28 January 1995	(Czechoslovakia) Liberec (Ještěd B K90)	N _{061}	(Austria) Ingemar Mayr	(Russia) Sergej Misjeev	(Germany) Steven Miehe	
98	22	29 January 1995	(Czechoslovakia) Liberec (Ještěd B K90)	N _{062}	(Norway) Sturle Holseter	(Czech Republic) Pavel Věchet	(Austria) Ingemar Mayr	
30th Bohemia Tournament Overall (28 – 29 January 1995)					(Austria) Ingemar Mayr	(Norway) Sturle Holseter	(Austria) Matthias Wallner	
		(Note: Event in Astún (29 January) by skijump-db.net does not provide the competition results, while another source indicates that the competition was not intended to be counted towards the general classification. Winner was Ruddy Jardin, with Yannick Revuz in second place and Alexander Stöckl in third.)29 January 1995	(Spain) Astún (Saltos Valle de Astún K90)	N _{unr}	unclear status with no reliable data sources available (mentioned only as International competition, not part of CC)			
99	23	3 February 1995	(Germany) Reit im Winkl (Franz-Haslberger-Schanze K90)	N _{063}	(Norway) Arve Vorvik	(Germany) Ronny Hornschuh	(Austria) Werner Schernthaner	
100	24	4 February 1995	(Austria) Saalfelden (Bibergschanze K85)	N _{064}	(Norway) Arve Vorvik	(Norway) Kjetil Moen	(Finland) Olli Happonen	
101	25	5 February 1995	(Germany) Ruhpolding (Große Zirmbergschanze K107) (Note: Not clear if Große Zirmbergschanze hill in Ruhpolding had K-point at K107 or K108 at that time.)	L _{035}	(Norway) Sturle Holseter	(Germany) Ronny Hornschuh	(Norway) Kjetil Moen	
German Austrian Three Hills Tournament Overall (3 – 4 February 1995)					(Germany) Ronny Hornschuh	(Norway) Sturle Holseter	(Austria) Andreas Beck	
102	26	11 February 1995	(United States) Westby (Snowflake K113) (Note: Not clear if Snowflake hill in Westby had K-point at K106, K108 or K113 at that time.)	L _{036}	(France) Steve Delaup	(United States) Brendan Doran	(Czech Republic) Tomáš Goder	
		(Note: Event in Westby (12 February) by skijump-db.net does not provide the competition results, while another source indicates that the competition was not intended to be counted towards the general classification. Winner was Brendan Doran, with Matt Kuusinen in second place and Randy Weber in third.)12 February 1995	(United States) Westby (Snowflake K113)	L _{unr}	unclear status with no reliable data sources available (mentioned only as International competition, not part of CC)			
103	27	18 February 1995	(United States) Iron Mountain (Pine Mountain K120) (Note: Not clear if Pine Mountain Ski Jump hill in Iron Mountain had K-point at K114 or K120 at that time.)	L _{037}	(Czech Republic) Ladislav Dluhoš	(Austria) Gerhard Schallert	(Austria) Matthias Wallner	
		(Note: Event in Iron Mountain (19 February) by skijump-db.net does not provide the competition results, while another source indicates that the competition was not intended to be counted towards the general classification. Winner was Kjetil Moen, with Gerhard Schallert in second place and Ladislav Dluhoš in third.)19 February 1995	(United States) Iron Mountain (Pine Mountain K120)	L _{unr}	unclear status with no reliable data sources available			
104	28	25 February 1995	(Japan) Sapporo (Ōkurayama K115)	L _{038}	(Japan) Naoto Itō	(Japan) Hiroya Saitō	(Japan) Masayuki Satō	
105	29	25 February 1995	(United States) Ishpeming (Suicide Hill K90)	N _{065}	(Czech Republic) Tomáš Goder	(Norway) Kjetil Moen	(France) Ruddy Jardiné	
		(Note: Event in Ishpeming (26 February) by skijump-db.net does not provide the competition results, while another source indicates that the competition was not intended to be counted towards the general classification. Winner was Matthias Wallner, with Josef Pirnbacher in second place; both Christian Samitz and Pavel Věchet in third.)26 February 1995	(United States) Ishpeming (Suicide Hill K90)	N _{unr}	unclear status with no reliable data sources available			
106	30	1 March 1995	(Japan) Zaō (Yamagata K85) (Note: Not clear if Yamagata hill in Zaō had K-point at K85 or K90 at that time.)	N _{066}	(Japan) Kazuhiro Higashi	(Japan) Kenji Suda	(Japan) Takuya Takeuchi	
107	31	2 March 1995	(Japan) Zaō (Yamagata K85)	N _{067}	(Japan) Kazuhiro Higashi	(Austria) Stefan Metzler	(Japan) Jun Shibuya	
108	32	4 March 1995	(Germany) Schönwald (Adlerschanzen Schönwald K83) (Note: Not clear if Adlerschanzen Schönwald hill in Schönwald had K-point at K83, K84 or K85 at that time.)	N _{068}	(Austria) Martin Höllwarth	(Finland) Olli Happonen	(Slovenia) Samo Gostiša	
109	33	5 March 1995	(Germany) Schönwald (Adlerschanzen Schönwald K83)	N _{069}	(Austria) Martin Höllwarth	(Finland) Olli Happonen	(Finland) Risto Jussilainen	
24th Schwarzwald Tournament Overall (4 – 5 March 1995)					(Austria) Martin Höllwarth	(Finland) Olli Happonen	(Slovenia) Samo Gostiša	
110	34	10 March 1995	(Norway) Sprova (Steinfjellbakken K87) (Note: Not clear if Steinfjellbakken hill in Sprova had K-point at K85, K87 or K90 at that time.)	N _{070}	(Finland) Olli Happonen	(Finland) Risto Jussilainen	(Finland) Pasi Kytösaho	
111	35	11 March 1995	(Norway) Sprova (Steinfjellbakken K87)	N _{071}	(Finland) Olli Happonen	(Norway) Frode Håre (Finland) Risto Jussilainen		
FIS Nordic World Ski Championships 1995 (12 – 18 March • (Canada) Thunder Bay)
112	36	26 March 1995	(Finland) Kuusamo (Rukatunturi K120)	L _{039}	(Norway) Arve Vorvik	(Finland) Tero Turkki	(Finland) Ari-Pekka Nikkola	
113	37	2 April 1995	(Sweden) Gällivare (Dundretkullen K90)	N _{072}	(Norway) Arve Vorvik	(Austria) Martin Höllwarth	(Finland) Risto Jussilainen	
114	38	8 April 1995	(Finland) Rovaniemi (Ounasvaara K90)	N _{073}	(Finland) Mika Laitinen	(Austria) Martin Höllwarth	(Finland) Tero Turkki	
115	39	9 April 1995	(Finland) Rovaniemi (Ounasvaara K90)	N _{074}	(Austria) Martin Höllwarth	(Finland) Mika Laitinen	(Finland) Tero Turkki	
4th FIS Continental Cup Overall (3 December 1994 – 9 April 1995)					(Finland) Olli Happonen	(Austria) Martin Höllwarth	(Finland) Risto Jussilainen	

== Standings ==
=== Overall ===
Rank	after 39 events	Points
1	(Finland) Olli Happonen	867
2	(Austria) Martin Höllwarth	862
3	(Finland) Risto Jussilainen	653
4	(Norway) Arve Vorvik	642
5	(Austria) Gerhard Schallert	632
6	(Finland) Tero Turkki	573
7	(Japan) Kazuyoshi Funaki	570
8	(Norway) Kjetil Moen	559
9	(Austria) Matthias Wallner	535
10	(Germany) Ronny Hornschuh	532

== Europa Cup vs. Continental Cup ==
- Last two Europa Cup seasons (1991/92 and 1992/93) are recognized as first two Continental Cup seasons by International Ski Federation (FIS), although Continental Cup under this name officially started first season in 1993/94 season.

== See also ==
- 1994–95 FIS World Cup
- 1994 FIS Grand Prix
