= Gerhard Schallert =

Austrian ski jumper

Gerhard Schallert (born 20 March 1975) is an Austrian ski jumper, national team representative, three-time medalist at the Winter Universiade in 1997 and 1999, and team silver medalist at the 1993 Junior World Championships.

He first competed in the World Cup during the qualifications for the 42nd Four Hills Tournament in 1994 in Innsbruck. His debut in a main competition was on 22 January 1994, in Sapporo, where he finished 45th. The next day, he earned his first World Cup point by placing 30th. Throughout his career, he finished in the top 30 of World Cup events five times, with his best result being 23rd place on 15 December 1996, in Harrachov.

In the 1992/1993 season, he won the final two Europa Cup competitions in Gällivare (3 April and 4 April 1993). Earlier that season, on 27 March, he took second place in Ruka, behind Toni Nieminen. In the Continental Cup, which succeeded the Europa Cup, he achieved four podium finishes. In the 1993/1994 season, he placed third twice – on 29 December 1993, in Sankt Aegyd and 9 January 1994, in Gallio. In the 1994/1995 season, he secured second place in Iron Mountain, and in the 1995/1996 season, he took third in the first competition in Zaō.

From 1990 to 1993, he participated in the Alpen Cup. In the 1992/1993 season, he reached the podium twice – third place in Villach on 6 January 1993, and first place in Reit im Winkl on 30 January 1993 – leading to a second-place finish in the overall standings.

In 1993, he won a silver medal in the team event at the Junior World Championships in Harrachov. In the individual event, he finished ninth.

In 1997, he competed at the Universiade in Muju. In the ski jumping events, he won two medals – a bronze in the individual normal hill event and a silver in the team event. In the individual large hill event, he placed seventh. Two years later, at the Universiade in Poprad, he again won a silver medal in the team event.

He is the brother of Richard Schallert, a ski jumper and coach, who has been the head coach of the Czech national team since 2014.

== Personal life ==
Gerhard Schallert was born in 1975. His brother is Richard Schallert (born 1964), a former ski jumper and later a coach, who has been the head coach of the Czech national team since 23 April 2014. Gerhard and Richard also have brothers Roland (born 1969) and Klaus (born 1973), who also competed in junior ski jumping events, and Martin.

== Career progression ==
=== Early career (up to 1990) ===
In December 1985 and January 1986, Schallert reached the podium in children's competitions – third place in Riezlern on 15 December 1985 behind Alexander Betz and Andreas Beck, and first place in Bezau on 6 January 1986. He continued competing in children's and school competitions over the next few years. In April 1988, he took third place in a spring ski jumping competition in Dornbirn on 10 April 1988, behind his brother Klaus and Sepp Zehnder. In July 1989, he won an international competition for under-14s on an artificial surface in Oberstdorf on 14 July 1989. In August of the same year, in Garmisch-Partenkirchen, he became the unofficial summer world vice-champion for children under 14 in the individual event on 4 August 1989, losing to Zoran Zupančič, and champion in the team event on 6 August 1989 alongside Richard Foldl, Martin Höllwarth, and Mario Stecher. In March 1990, he took third place in OPA competitions for his age group (born 1975) in Breitenberg on 4 March 1990 and third in the Raiffeisen competition in Riezlern on 11 March 1990.

=== 1990–1992 ===
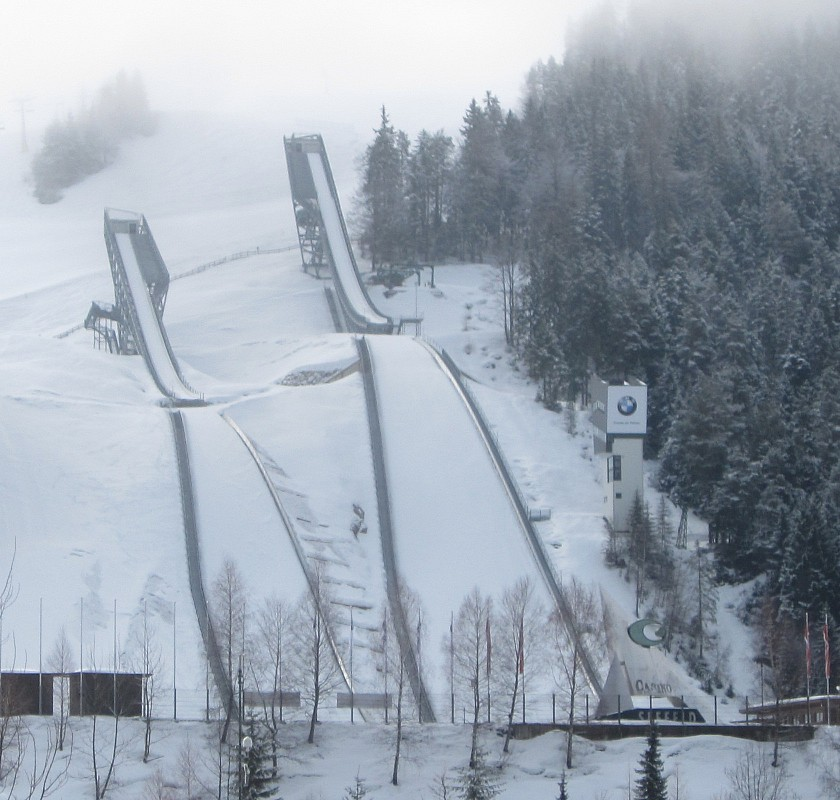
Toni-Seelos-Olympiaschanze (right) in Seefeld – the hill where Schallert debuted in Europa Cup competitions in 1991

In December 1990, Schallert debuted in the Alpen Cup in Andelsbuch on 15 December 1990, finishing 32nd. In the 1990/1991 season, he competed in all six Alpen Cup events, placing in the top 15 (which earned points) three times. He first earned points on 12 January 1991, in Predazzo, finishing fourth behind Milan Kučera, Damjan Fras, and Marc Nölke. He took seventh place in Täsch on 19 January 1991 and 11th in Les Rousses on 9 February 1991. He finished 11th in the overall Alpen Cup standings. In February 1991, he debuted in the Europa Cup in Seefeld on 17 February 1991, finishing 30th among 64 competitors, 18.7 points short of the top 15 needed for points. In the 1990/1991 season, he reached the podium twice in junior competitions: second place in the Franz Haslberger Memorial in Reit im Winkl on 21 February 1991, behind Adolf Grugger, and third in the OPA Games in Einsiedeln on 3 March 1991, behind Grugger and Jozef Waller.

In the summer of 1991, he competed in two junior competitions on artificial surfaces in Oberstdorf, finishing second on 2 August 1991 and fifth on 16 August 1991. In the 1991/1992 Alpen Cup season, he competed in four of seven events, earning points once with a 14th-place finish in Hinterzarten on 15 February 1992.

=== 1992/1993 season ===
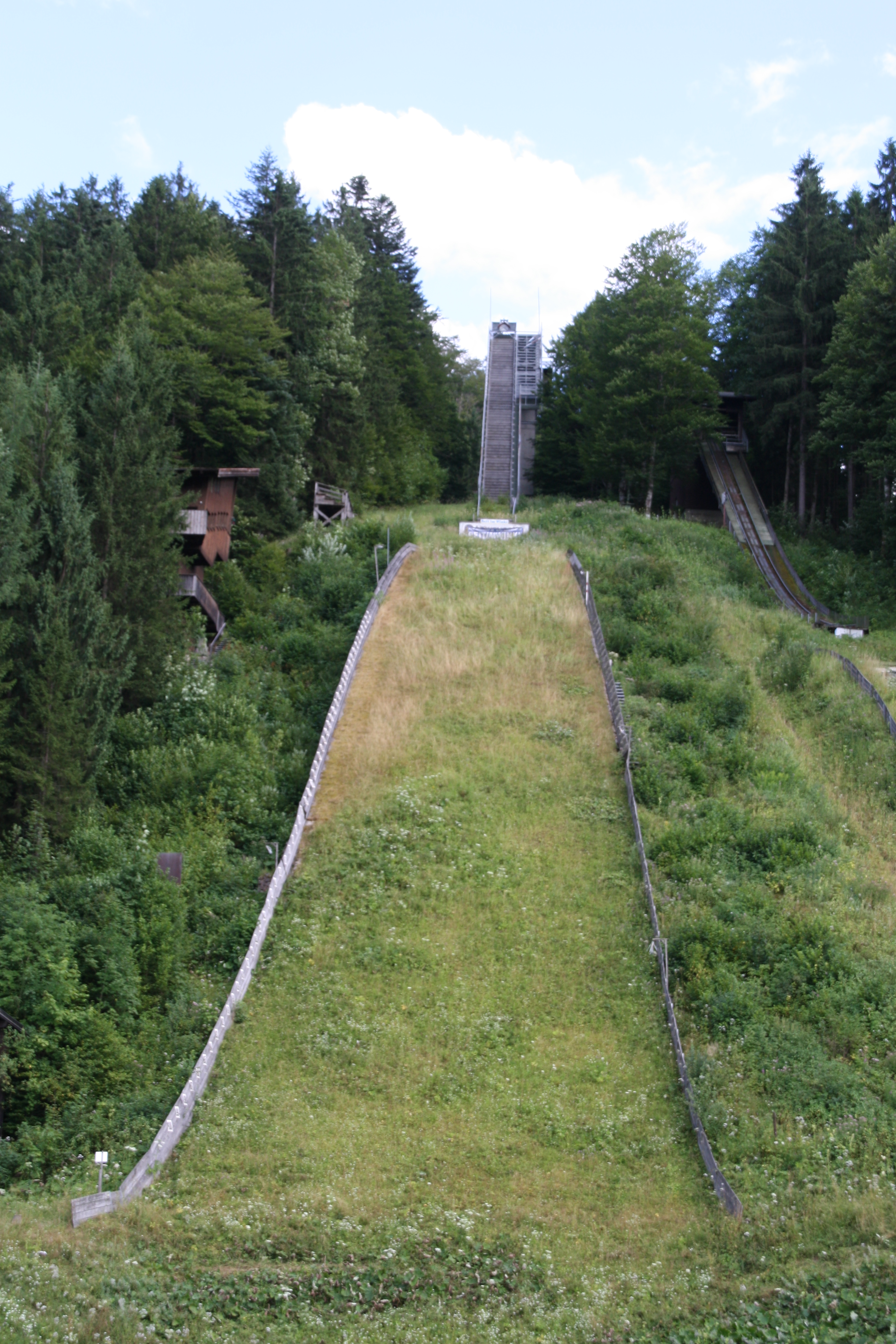
Franz-Haslberger-Schanze in Reit im Winkl – the hill where Schallert won an Alpen Cup event in 1993

In the 1992/1993 Alpen Cup season, Schallert competed in the first four events, finishing in the top 10 each time: ninth in Planica on 19 December 1992, third in Villach on 6 January 1993, eighth in Predazzo on 9 January 1993, and first in Reit im Winkl on 30 January 1993, his first victory at this level. This earned him second place in the overall Alpen Cup standings with 55 points, tied with Andreas Beck and Gerhard Gattinger, behind Adolf Grugger. Between Alpen Cup events, he competed in the Europa Cup in Wörgl on 10 January 1993, finishing 40th. In the 1992/1993 Europa Cup season, he earned points five times, finishing in the top 10: seventh and eighth in Sprova on 19 March and 20 March 1993, second in Ruka on 27 March 1993 behind Toni Nieminen, and first in both Gällivare events on 3 April and 4 April 1993. This secured him ninth place in the overall Europa Cup standings.

In March 1993, he competed at the Junior World Championships in Harrachov. In the ski jumping events, he finished ninth individually on 5 March 1993 and second in the team event on 3 March 1993 with Andreas Widhölzl, Ingemar Mayr, and Thomas Kuglitsch.

=== 1993/1994 season ===
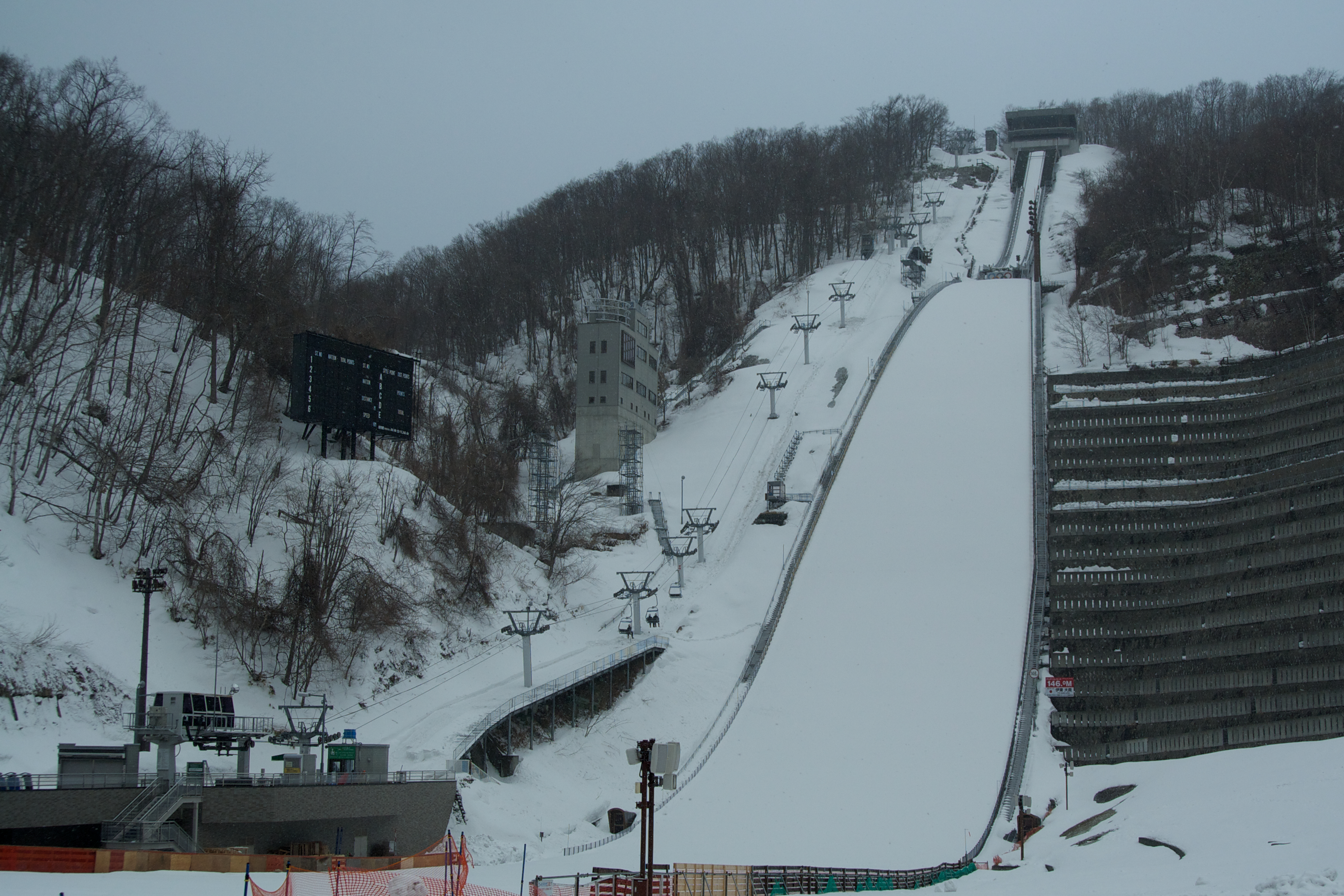
Okurayama Ski Jump Stadium in Sapporo – the hill where Schallert earned his first World Cup points in 1994

In December 1993, Schallert competed in the Continental Cup in Lillehammer, finishing 37th and 29th on 4 December and 5 December 1993, earning his first two points in the latter. He competed in five more Continental Cup events that month, scoring points each time: second 10 in Oberwiesenthal, Lauscha, Wörgl, and Sankt Moritz, and third in Sankt Aegyd on 29 December 1993, behind Klaus Huber and Christian Moser. In January 1994, he debuted in World Cup qualifications for the 42nd Four Hills Tournament in Innsbruck and Bischofshofen but failed to qualify. In Gallio, he took third in the Continental Cup on 9 January 1994, behind Nicolas Jean-Prost and Ronny Hornschuh. In Sapporo, he competed in two World Cup events, finishing 45th and 30th on 22 January and 23 January 1994, earning his first World Cup point.

In February and March 1994, he competed in 11 more Continental Cup events, scoring points in six: fifth in Ruhpolding, eighth in Schönwald, seventh in Zakopane, 28th in Planica, and 22nd and 16th in Szczyrbskie Jezioro.

=== 1994/1995 season ===
In August and September 1994, Schallert competed in two of three Summer Grand Prix events, failing to qualify in Hinterzarten and finishing 47th in Stams on 3 September 1994. He placed 64th in the overall standings.

In the 1994/1995 Continental Cup season, he started with 27th and 32nd places in Lillehammer on 3 December and 4 December 1994. In Planica, he competed in World Cup events on the normal hill, finishing 39th and 42nd on 10 December and 11 December 1994. On 26 December 1994, he took seventh in Sankt Moritz. In the 43rd Four Hills Tournament, he competed in two main events, finishing 45th in Garmisch-Partenkirchen on 1 January 1995 and 28th in Bischofshofen on 6 January 1995, earning three World Cup points. He failed to qualify in Oberstdorf and Innsbruck, finishing 45th in the tournament.

After the tournament, he competed in the Willingen World Cup but failed to qualify. He then returned to the Continental Cup, finishing in the top 10 eleven times: seventh in Courchevel, fifth in Szczyrbskie Jezioro, fourth twice in Zakopane, ninth in Reit im Winkl, seventh in Saalfelden, tenth in Ruhpolding, second in Iron Mountain on 18 February 1995 behind Ladislav Dluhoš, and second, fifth, and sixth in non-point events in Iron Mountain, Westby, and Ishpeming. In March, he placed ninth in the Black Forest Tournament, finishing 11th and 13th in Schönwald. In April, he was sixth in Gällivare and fourth and fifth in Rovaniemi. He collected 632 points, finishing fifth in the Continental Cup standings, 235 points behind Olli Happonen and 19 behind Risto Jussilainen.

=== 1995/1996 season ===
In the summer of 1995, Schallert competed in the Summer Grand Prix, failing to qualify in Kuopio and finishing 45th in Stams on 2 September 1995, placing 67th overall.

In the 1995/1996 World Cup season, he competed in five December events, qualifying for four: 29th in Predazzo on 12 December 1995, 28th in Chamonix on 17 December 1995, 49th in Planica on 10 December 1995, and 42nd in Chamonix on 16 December 1995. He failed to qualify in Villach. In January 1996, he attempted to qualify for the 44th Four Hills Tournament in Innsbruck and Bischofshofen but failed.

He then competed in the 1995/1996 Continental Cup, earning points in 13 events. He first scored on 12 January 1996 in Reit im Winkl (16th), followed by 14th in Saalfelden and 19th in Berchtesgaden, placing 12th in the Three Hills Tournament. In January, he was tenth and sixth in Liberec and eighth in Seefeld. His best results were in March in Zaō: third behind Frank Reichel and Naoto Itō on 13 March 1996, and fifth. He also finished fourth and seventh in Braunlage (non-point events). He collected 258 points, finishing 34th in the Continental Cup and 91st in the World Cup with 3 points.

=== 1996–1999 ===
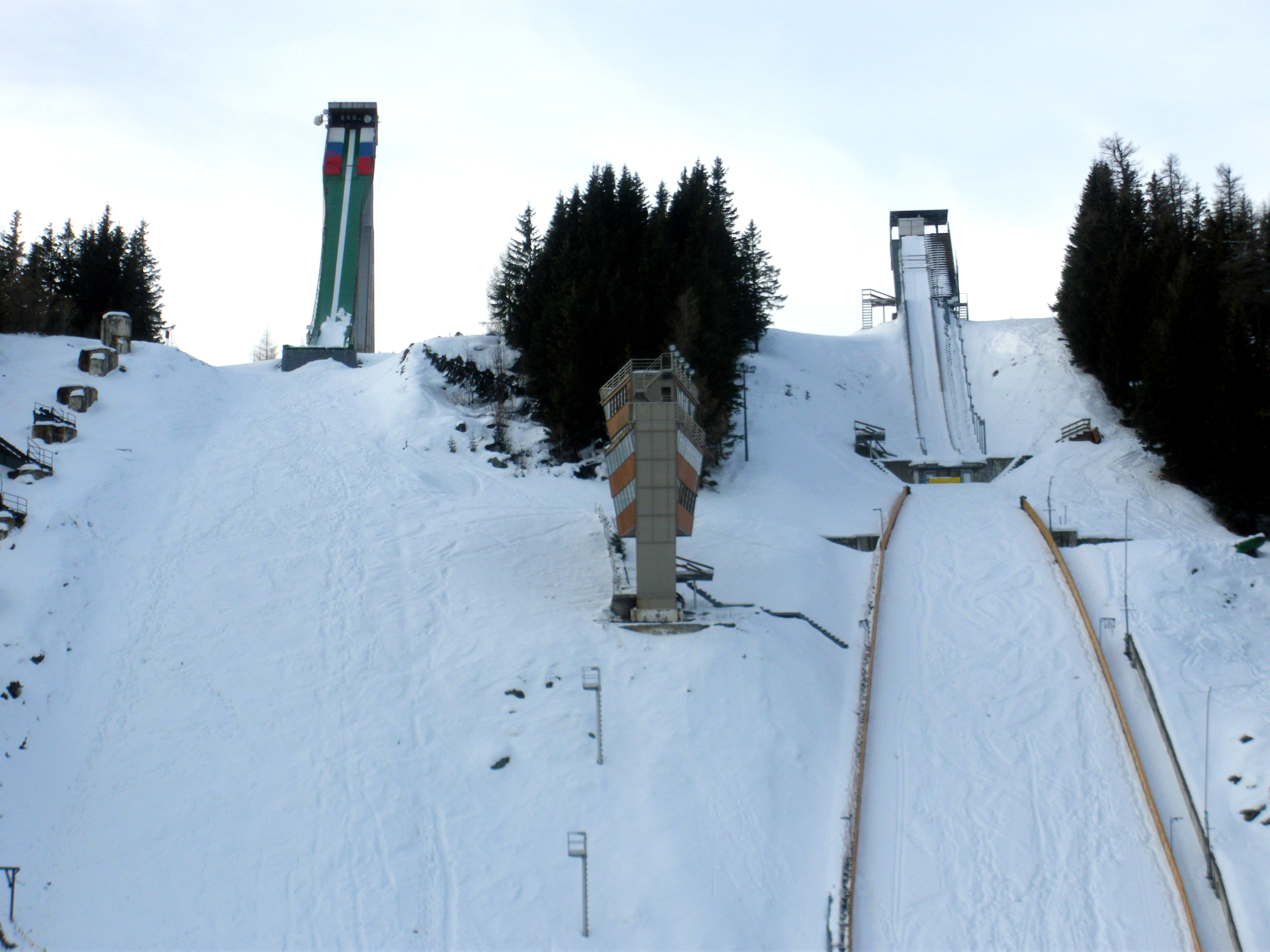
MS 1970 B (right) in Szczyrbskie Jezioro – the hill where Schallert won a Universiade silver medal in 1999

In the summer of 1996, Schallert competed in seven Continental Cup events, scoring points in five: fourth in Frenštát pod Radhoštěm, 12th in Zakopane, 27th in Hakuba, and 16th and 25th in Muju. In the Summer Grand Prix, he finished 45th in Predazzo and 28th in Stams on 31 August 1996, earning 3 points for 52nd place overall.

In the 1996/1997 World Cup season, he competed in Harrachov, failing to qualify for the first event but finishing 23rd in the second on 15 December 1996, his career-best World Cup result, earning 8 points. In the Continental Cup, he finished 19th in Brotterode, 16th in Lauscha, and 20th in Sankt Moritz.

In the 45th Four Hills Tournament, he failed to qualify for the first three events but finished 38th in Bischofshofen on 6 January 1997, his final World Cup appearance, finishing 88th overall.

In January 1997, he scored points in five Continental Cup events, reaching the top 10 twice: fifth in Ramsau and tenth in Oberhof. At the 1997 Winter Universiade in Muju, he won a bronze medal in the individual normal hill event on 26 January 1997, behind Łukasz Kruczek and Yoshiharu Ikeda, and a silver in the team event on 30 January 1997 with Alexander Pointner, Christian Reinthaler, and Werner Schuster, losing to Japan by 3 points. In the large hill event on 2 February 1997, he finished seventh.

After the Universiade, he competed in eight Continental Cup events, scoring points in seven and finishing in the top 10 four times: tenth in Iron Mountain, seventh in Ishpeming, fourth in Braunlage, and tenth in Vikersund. He collected 401 points, finishing 19th in the Continental Cup standings.

In January 1999, at the Universiade in Poprad, he won a silver medal in the team event on the normal hill in Szczyrbskie Jezioro on 26 January 1999 with Fabian Ebenhoch, Christian Reinthaler, and Gerhard Gattinger, finishing 38 points behind Japan.

== Achievements ==
=== Universiade ===
Place	Date	Location	Hill	K-Point	Event	Jump 1	Jump 2	Score	Deficit	Winner
3.	26 January 1997	(South Korea) Muju	Muju Resort	K-90	Ind.	92.0	90.5	238.0	15.5	Łukasz Kruczek
2.	30 January 1997	(South Korea) Muju	Muju Resort	K-90	Team	93.5	94.0	720.0 (248.0)	3.0	Japan
7.	2 February 1997	(South Korea) Muju	Muju Resort	K-120	Ind.	126.5	115.0	232.2	47.9	Yoshiharu Ikeda
2.	26 January 1999	(Slovakia) Štrbské Pleso	MS 1970 B	K-90	Team	85.5	87.0	633.0 (214.0)	38.0	Japan

=== Junior World Championships ===
Place	Date	Location	Hill	K-Point	Event	Jump 1	Jump 2	Score	Deficit	Winner
2.	3 March 1993	(Czech Republic) Harrachov	Čerťák	K-90	Team	82.5	96.0	845.8 (221.6)	13.2	Finland
9.	5 March 1993	(Czech Republic) Harrachov	Čerťák	K-90	Ind.	84.0	82.5	203.4	29.8	Janne Ahonen

=== World Cup ===
==== Overall standings ====
Season	Place
1993/1994	94th
1994/1995	91st
1995/1996	89th
1996/1997	88th

==== Individual World Cup results ====
Source
1993/1994 Season
Planica K92	Planica K120	Predazzo K120	Courchevel K120	Engelberg K120	Oberstdorf K115	Garmisch-Partenkirchen K107	Innsbruck K110	Bischofshofen K120	Murau K120	Liberec K120	Liberec K120	Sapporo K90	Sapporo K115	Lahti K90	Örnsköldsvik K90	MŚL – Planica K185	Thunder Bay K90	Thunder Bay K90	Points									
-	-	-	-	-	-	-	q	q	-	-	-	45	30	-	-	-	-	-	1									
1994/1995 Season
Planica K92	Planica K92	Oberstdorf K115	Garmisch-Partenkirchen K107	Innsbruck K110	Bischofshofen K120	Willingen K120	Engelberg K120	Engelberg K120	Sapporo K90	Sapporo K115	Lahti K90	Lahti K114	Kuopio K92	Falun K90	Falun K90	Lillehammer K120	Oslo K110	Vikersund K170	Vikersund K170	Oberstdorf K182	Points							
39	42	q	45	q	28	q	-	-	-	-	-	-	-	-	-	-	-	-	-	-	3							
1995/1996 Season
Lillehammer K90	Lillehammer K120	Villach K90	Planica K120	Predazzo K90	Chamonix K95	Chamonix K95	Oberhof K120	Oberstdorf K115	Garmisch-Partenkirchen K107	Innsbruck K110	Bischofshofen K120	Engelberg K120	Engelberg K120	Sapporo K90	Sapporo K115	Zakopane K116	Zakopane K116	MŚL – Tauplitz K185	MŚL – Tauplitz K185	Iron Mountain K120	Iron Mountain K120	Kuopio K92	Lahti K90	Lahti K114	Harrachov K180	Falun K90	Oslo K110	Points
-	-	q	49	29	42	28	-	-	-	q	q	-	-	-	-	-	-	-	-	-	-	-	-	-	-	-	-	5
1996/1997 Season
Lillehammer K120	Lillehammer K120	Ruka K120	Ruka K120	Harrachov K120	Harrachov K120	Oberstdorf K115	Garmisch-Partenkirchen K115	Innsbruck K110	Bischofshofen K120	Engelberg K120	Engelberg K120	Sapporo K90	Sapporo K120	Hakuba K120	Willingen K120	Willingen K120	Tauplitz K185	Tauplitz K185	Lahti K114	Kuopio K92	Falun K115	Oslo K112	Planica K185	Planica K185	Points			
-	-	-	-	q	23	q	q	q	38	-	-	-	-	-	-	-	-	-	-	-	-	-	-	-	8			
Legend
1 2 3 4–10 11–30 Below 30 dq – Disqualified q – Did not qualify - – Did not compete

==== Four Hills Tournament ====
1993–94 Four Hills Tournament
Oberstdorf	Garmisch-Partenkirchen	Innsbruck	Bischofshofen	Score	Place
–	–	q	q	–	–
1994–95 Four Hills Tournament
Oberstdorf	Garmisch-Partenkirchen	Innsbruck	Bischofshofen	Score	Place
q	45	q	28	256.2	45th
1995–96 Four Hills Tournament
Oberstdorf	Garmisch-Partenkirchen	Innsbruck	Bischofshofen	Score	Place
–	–	q	q	–	–
1996–97 Four Hills Tournament
Oberstdorf	Garmisch-Partenkirchen	Innsbruck	Bischofshofen	Score	Place
q	q	q	38	83.4	70th

=== Europa Cup ===
==== Overall standings ====
Season	Place
1990/1991	Unclassified
1992/1993	9th

==== Individual Europa Cup results ====
1990/1991 Season
Oberwiesenthal	Chaux-Neuve	Sankt Moritz	Sankt Aegyd	Saalfelden	Ruhpolding	Planica	Harrachov	Liberec	La Molina	Willingen	Willingen	Seefeld in Tirol	Gallio	Titisee-Neustadt	Schönwald	Szczyrk	Ruka	Rovaniemi	Points			
-	-	-	-	-	-	-	-	-	-	-	-	30	-	-	-	-	-	-	0			
1992/1993 Season
Oberwiesenthal	Oberwiesenthal	Sankt Moritz	Sankt Aegyd	Planica	Planica	Wörgl	Willingen	Willingen	Gallio	Gallio	Zakopane	Szczyrk	Titisee-Neustadt	Schönwald	Chamonix	Oberhof	Sprova	Sprova	Kuopio	Gällivare	Gällivare	Points
-	-	-	-	-	-	40	-	-	-	-	-	-	-	-	-	-	7	8	2	1	1	87
Legend
1 2 3 4–10 11–15 Below 15: – Did not compete

=== Continental Cup ===
==== Overall standings ====
Season	Place
1993/1994	13th
1994/1995	5th
1995/1996	34th
1996/1997	19th

=== Summer Grand Prix ===
==== Overall standings ====
Season	Place
1994	64th
1995	67th
1996	52nd

==== Individual Summer Grand Prix results ====
Source
1994
Oberwiesenthal	Gallio	Wörgl	Points		
q	-	47	77.9		
1995
Ruka	Sprova	Oberwiesenthal	Wörgl	Points	
q	-	-	45	90.3	
1996
Sprova	Oberwiesenthal	Oberwiesenthal	Gallio	Wörgl	Points
-	-	-	45	28	3
Legend
1 2 3 4–10 11–30 Below 30 q – Did not qualify: – Did not compete

=== Alpen Cup ===
==== Overall standings ====
Season	Place
1990/1991	11th
1991/1992	29th
1992/1993	2nd

=== Junior World Championships (unofficial) ===
Place	Date	Location	Hill	K-Point	Event	Jump 1	Jump 2	Score	Deficit	Winner
2.	4 August 1989	(Germany) Garmisch-Partenkirchen	Hausbergschanze	K-40	Ind. U-14	40.0	40.5	187.3	16.8	Zoran Zupančič
1.	6 August 1989	(Germany) Garmisch-Partenkirchen	Hausbergschanze	K-40	Team	40.5	42.0	598.5 (192.1)	–	–
