= 1990–91 FIS Ski Jumping Europa Cup =

Europal Cup 1990/91
Winners
- Overall/Winter: (Austria) Franz Neuländtner

Competitions
- Venues: 18
- Individual: 18

The 1990/91 FIS Ski Jumping Europa Cup was the 11th Europa Cup season in ski jumping.

== Calendar ==
=== Men ===
EC	Season	Date	Place	Hill	Size	Winner	Second	Third
	1		(Germany) Oberwiesenthal	Fichtelbergschanzen K90	NH	(Austria) Franz Neuländtner	(Austria) Werner Schuster	(Germany) René Kummerlöw
	2		(France) Chaux-Neuve	La Côté Feuillée K90	NH	(France) Régis Bajard	(Switzerland) Sylvain Freiholz	(Norway) Knut Müller
	3		(Switzerland) St. Moritz	Olympiaschanze K94	NH	(Austria) Klaus Huber	(Switzerland) Stephan Zünd	(Austria) Werner Schuster
	4		(Austria) St. Aegyd	Klaushoferschanze K73	NH	(Austria) Werner Rathmayr	(Austria) Andreas Rauschmeier	(Germany) Ingo Züchner
	5		(Austria) Saalfelden	Bibergschanze K85	NH	(Norway) Clas Brede Bråthen	(Germany) Ingo Züchner	(Germany) Norbert Hils
	6		(Germany) Ruhpolding	Große Zirmbergschanze K107	LH	(Austria) Franz Neuländtner	(Norway) Clas Brede Bråthen	(Germany) Norbert Hils
	7		(Slovenia) Planica	Srednja Bloudkova K90	NH	(Austria) Franz Neuländtner	(Norway) Bernt Espen Kolsrud	(Austria) Oliver Strohmaier
	8		(Czechoslovakia) Harrachov	Ještěd A K120	LH	(Austria) Franz Neuländtner	(Czechoslovakia) František Jež	(Switzerland) Sylvain Freiholz
	9		(Czechoslovakia) Liberec	Čerťák K120	LH	(Czechoslovakia) František Jež	(Czechoslovakia) Ladislav Dluhoš	(Czechoslovakia) Pavel Ploc
	10		(Spain) La Molina	Trampolín Albert Bofill Mosella K75	NH	(Germany) Andreas Scherer	(Czechoslovakia) Jiří Raška Jr.	(Austria) Klaus Huber
	11		(Germany) Willingen	Mühlenkopfschanze K120	LH	(Germany) Ralph Gebstedt	(Austria) Andreas Goldberger	(Czechoslovakia) Peter Berger
	12		(Austria) Seefeld in Tirol	Toni-Seelos-Olympiaschanze K70	NH	(France) Régis Bajard	(Austria) Martin Höllwarth	(Austria) Franz Neuländtner
	13		(Italy) Gallio	Trampolino di Pakstall K92	NH	(Italy) Ivo Pertile	(Germany) Ingo Lesser	(Italy) Roberto Cecon
	14		(Germany) Titisee-Neustadt	Hochfirstschanze K112	LH	(Austria) Werner Schuster	(Austria) Franz Neuländtner	(Germany) Andreas Scherer
	15		(Germany) Schönwald im Schwarzwald	Adlerschanzen Schönwald K84	NH	(Austria) Werner Schuster	(Czechoslovakia) David Jiroutek	(Germany) Ingo Lesser
	16		(Poland) Szczyrk	Skalite K85	NH	(Austria) Franz Neuländtner	(Austria) Werner Rathmayr	(Czechoslovakia) Tomáš Goder
	17		(Finland) Kuusamo	Rukatunturi K120	LH	(Sweden) Staffan Tällberg	(Finland) Vesa Hakala	(Norway) Rune Olijnyk
	18		(Finland) Rovaniemi	Ounasvaara K90	NH	(Finland) Raimo Ylipulli	(Sweden) Staffan Tällberg	(Finland) Vesa Hakala

== Standings ==
=== Men ===
Rank	after 18 events	Points
1	(Austria) Franz Neuländtner	217
2	(Austria) Werner Schuster	115
3	(Germany) Ingo Lesser	93
4	(Germany) Andreas Scherer	83
5	(Germany) Ingo Züchner	78
6	(Austria) Werner Rathmayr	70
7	(Germany) René Kummerlöw	62
8	(France) Régis Bajard	56
9	(Norway) Clas Brede Bråthen	47
10	(Czechoslovakia) Tomáš Goder	46

== Europa Cup vs. Continental Cup ==
This was originally last Europa Cup season and is also recognized as the first Continental Cup season by International Ski Federation although under this name began its first official season in 1993/94.
