= 1994–95 FIS Ski Flying World Cup =

Winter sport competition

Ski Flying World Cup 1994/95
Winners
- Overall: (Austria) Andreas Goldberger
- Nations Cup (unofficial): Japan

Competitions
- Venues: 2
- Individual: 3
- Cancelled: 1

The 1994/95 FIS Ski Flying World Cup was the 5th official World Cup season in ski flying awarded with small crystal globe as the subdiscipline of FIS Ski Jumping World Cup.

== Map of World Cup hosts ==
(Norway) Vikersund	(Germany) Oberstdorf
Vikersundbakken	Heini-Klopfer-Skiflugschanze
Europe

== Calendar ==
=== Men ===
All	No.	Date	Place (Hill)	Size	Winner	Second	Third	Ski flying leader	R.
351	1	18 February 1995	(Norway) Vikersund (Vikersundbakken K175)	F _{028}	(Austria) Andreas Goldberger	(Japan) Takanobu Okabe	(Norway) Lasse Ottesen	(Austria) Andreas Goldberger	
352	2	19 February 1995	(Norway) Vikersund (Vikersundbakken K175)	F _{029}	(Austria) Andreas Goldberger	(Japan) Takanobu Okabe	(Italy) Roberto Cecon	(Austria) Andreas Goldberger	
353	3	25 February 1995	(Germany) Oberstdorf (Heini-Klopfer K182)	F _{030}	(Austria) Andreas Goldberger	(Italy) Roberto Cecon	(Germany) Jens Weißflog	(Austria) Andreas Goldberger	
		26 February 1995	(Germany) Oberstdorf (Heini-Klopfer K182)	F _{cnx}	cancelled in 1st round after 10 jumpers due to heavy snowfall			—	
5th FIS Ski Flying Men's Overall (18 – 25 February 1995)					(Austria) Andreas Goldberger	(Japan) Takanobu Okabe	(Italy) Roberto Cecon	Ski Flying Overall	

== Standings ==
=== Ski Flying ===
Rank	after 3 events	18/02/1995 Vikersund	19/02/1995 Vikersund	25/02/1995 Oberstdorf	Total
	(Austria) Andreas Goldberger	100	100	100	300
2	(Japan) Takanobu Okabe	80	80	29	189
3	(Italy) Roberto Cecon	45	60	80	185
4	(Norway) Lasse Ottesen	60	45	18	123
5	(Finland) Janne Ahonen	18	50	32	100
6	(Finland) Mika Laitinen	36	22	40	98
7	(Japan) Kazuyoshi Funaki	40	24	26	90
8	(Czech Republic) Jakub Sucháček	29	32	22	83
9	(Czech Republic) Zbynek Krompolc	50	29	—	79
10	(Finland) Ari-Pekka Nikkola	26	40	10	76
11	(Czech Republic) Jaroslav Sakala	22	8	45	75
12	(Slovenia) Urban Franc	14	36	14	64
13	(Norway) Espen Bredesen	32	14	15	61
14	(Germany) Jens Weißflog	—	—	60	60
15	(Germany) Gerd Siegmund	—	—	50	50
16	(Germany) Christof Duffner	20	26	—	46
17	(Japan) Jinya Nishikata	16	20	—	36
	(France) Nicolas Jean-Prost	—	—	36	36
19	(Japan) Naoto Itō	12	18	—	30
20	(Finland) Risto Jussilainen	24	1	2	27
21	(Germany) Andreas Scherer	8	10	7	25
22	(Norway) Bjørn Myrbakken	7	5	12	24
	(Germany) Dieter Thoma	—	—	24	24
24	(Slovenia) Matjaž Kladnik	15	7	—	22
	(Norway) Helge Brendryen	11	6	5	22
26	(Norway) Roar Ljøkelsøy	9	12	—	21
27	(Slovenia) Samo Gostiša	4	—	16	20
	(Germany) Ralph Gebstedt	—	—	20	20
29	(Japan) Hiroya Saitō	10	9	—	19
30	(Germany) Rico Meinel	—	16	—	16
31	(Finland) Toni Nieminen	—	15	—	15
32	(Norway) Eirik Halvorsen	13	—	—	13
	(Norway) Alf Dyblie	2	11	—	13
	(Japan) Naoki Yasuzaki	—	13	—	13
	(Czech Republic) František Jež	—	—	13	13
36	(Slovenia) Dejan Jekovec	1	2	8	11
	(Germany) Hansjörg Jäkle	—	—	11	11
38	(Austria) Martin Höllwarth	6	—	3	9
	(Czech Republic) Jiří Parma	—	—	9	9
40	(Austria) Ingemar Mayr	—	—	6	6
41	(Norway) Jostein Smeby	5	—	—	5
42	(Slovenia) Robert Meglič	—	4	—	4
	(Switzerland) Bruno Reuteler	—	—	4	4
44	(Austria) Werner Rathmayr	3	—	—	3
	(Czech Republic) Jaroslav Kahánek	—	3	—	3
46	(Slovenia) Marko Bogataj	—	—	1	1

=== Nations Cup (unofficial) ===
Rank	after 3 events	Points
1	Japan	377
2	Austria	318
3	Finland	316
4	Norway	282
5	Czech Republic	262
6	Germany	252
7	Italy	185
8	Slovenia	122
9	France	36
10	Switzerland	4
