= 1995–96 Four Hills Tournament =

Ski jumping competition

The 1995-96 Four Hills Tournament took place at the four traditional venues of Oberstdorf, Garmisch-Partenkirchen, Innsbruck and Bischofshofen, located in Germany and Austria, between 30 December 1995 and 6 January 1996.

== Results ==
Date	Place	Hill	Size	Winner	Second	Third	Ref.
30 Dec 1995	(Germany) Oberstdorf	Schattenbergschanze K-115	LH	(Finland) Mika Laitinen	(Germany) Jens Weißflog	(Japan) Masahiko Harada	
1 Jan 1996	(Germany) Garmisch-Partenkirchen	Große Olympiaschanze K-107	LH	(Austria) Reinhard Schwarzenberger	(Norway) Espen Bredesen	(Germany) Jens Weißflog	
4 Jan 1996	(Austria) Innsbruck	Bergiselschanze K-110	LH	(Austria) Andreas Goldberger	(Germany) Jens Weißflog	(Japan) Hiroya Saito	
6 Jan 1996	(Austria) Bischofshofen	Paul-Ausserleitner-Schanze K-120	LH	(Germany) Jens Weißflog	(Norway) Espen Bredesen	(Finland) Ari-Pekka Nikkola	

== Overall ==
Pos	Ski Jumper	Points
1	(Germany) Jens Weißflog	952.3
2	(Finland) Ari-Pekka Nikkola	909.7
3	(Austria) Reinhard Schwarzenberger	882.1
4	(Japan) Hiroya Saito	881.9
5	(Germany) Christof Duffner	872.9
6	(Finland) Janne Ahonen	869.1
7	(Austria) Andreas Goldberger	859.6
8	(Japan) Jinya Nishikata	845.2
9	(Finland) Jani Soininen	841.1
10	(Japan) Noriaki Kasai	838.9
