= FIS Ski Flying World Championships 1994 =

1994 edition of the FIS Ski-Flying World Championships

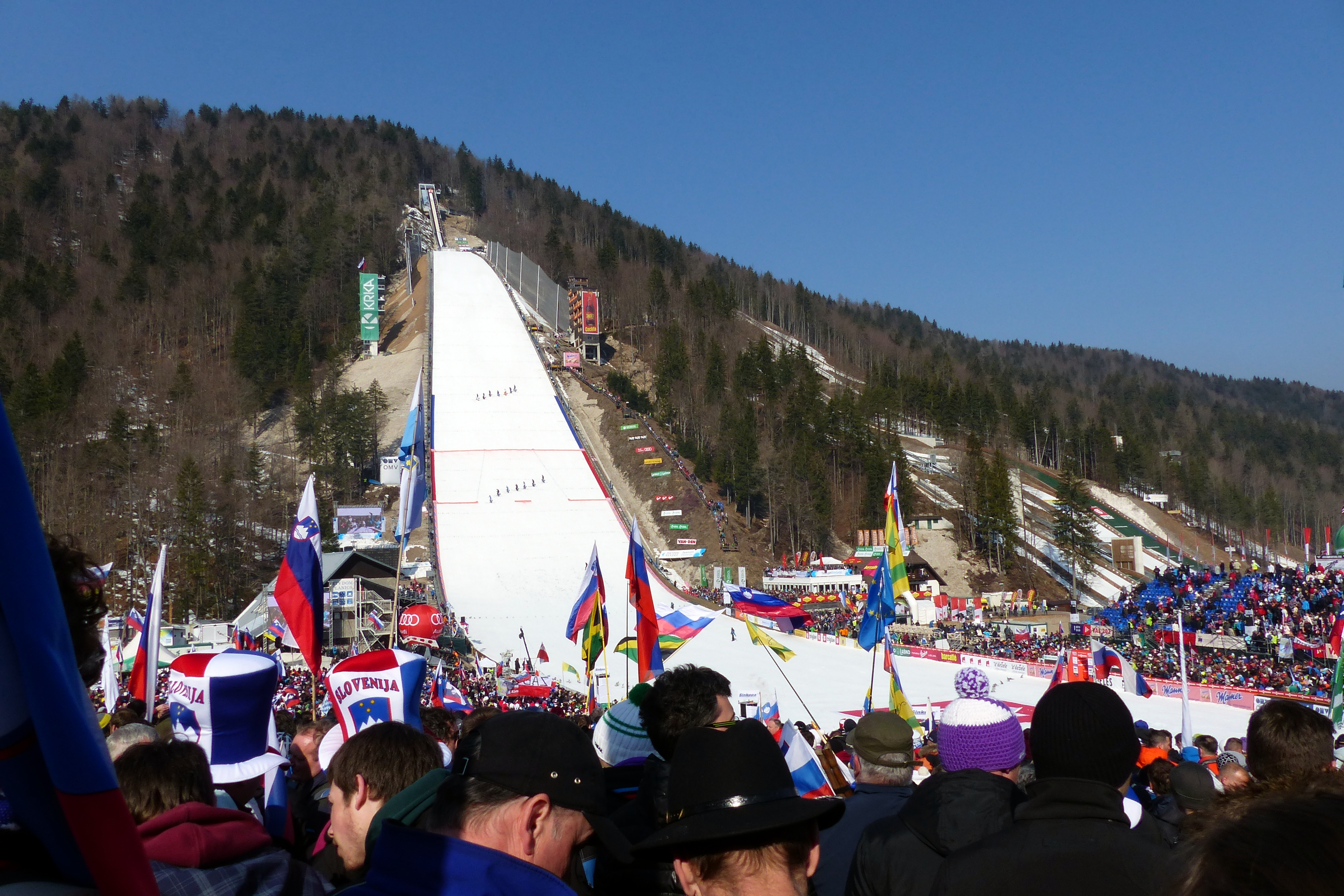
- Venue: Velikanka bratov Gorišek K185
- Date: 20 March 1994
- Competitors: 43 from 15 nations
- Winning score: 351.3

Medalists
| gold medal | Jaroslav Sakala | Czech Republic |
| silver medal | Espen Bredesen | Norway |
| bronze medal | Roberto Cecon | Italy |

The FIS Ski Flying World Ski Championships 1994 took place on 20 March 1994 in Planica, Slovenia for the record fourth time. It also counted for World Cup. They previously hosted the championships as being part of Yugoslavia in 1972, 1979 and 1985. This was the first large international sporting event in Slovenia after they declared its independence in 1991 following the Ten-Day War.

== Schedule ==
| Date | Event | Rounds | Longest jump of the day | Visitors |
|---|---|---|---|---|
| 17 March 1994 | Hill test | 2 | 203 metres (666 ft) by Toni Nieminen | N/A |
| 18 March 1994 | Official Training | 2 | 209 metres (686 ft) by Espen Bredesen | 20,000 |
| 19 March 1994 | Competition, Day 1 | — | canceled; strong wind, no jumps at all | 40,000 |
| 20 March 1994 | Competition, Day 2 | 3 | 199 metres (653 ft) by Roberto Cecon | 30,000 |

== All jumps over 200 metres ==
Chronological order:

- 202 metres (663 ft) – 17 March – Andreas Goldberger, WR crash (1RD, Practise)
- 203 metres (666 ft) – 17 March – Toni Nieminen WR (1RD, Practice)
- 202 metres (663 ft) – 17 March – Andreas Goldberger (2RD, Practise)
- 207 metres (679 ft) – 18 March – Christof Duffner WR crash (1RD, Official training)
- 209 metres (686 ft) – 18 March – Espen Bredesen WR (1RD, Official training)
- 201 metres (659 ft) – 18 March – Andreas Goldberger (2RD, Official training)
- 200 metres (656 ft) – 18 March – Jaroslav Sakala (2RD, Official training)

== Fair play ==
Espen Bredesen (172 and 182 m) switched his silver medal with Roberto Cecon (160 and 199 m) bronze at the press conference after medal ceremony, as he deserved it more due to the rule which didn't allow to score jumps exceeding 191 metres.

== Historic 200 metres barrier broken ==
On 17 March 1994 sports history was made. Austrian ski jumper Andreas Goldberger became the first person in history to jump over 200 metres (660 ft) barrier, but it didn't count, as he touched the snow with his hands at 202 metres (663 ft) during practice.

On the same day and also in the first round, just a few minutes later after Goldi, Finnish ski jumper Toni Nieminen made a history and officially became the first person to land on his feet over 200 metres (660 ft) when he stood at 203 metres (666 ft).

== Competition ==
On 17 March 1994 practise session with 36 on start in two rounds was on schedule with historic 200 metres barrier broken and started with WR by test jumper Martin Höllwarth at 196 metres. But Miran Tepeš was honoured to be the first, landing at 163 metres.

On 18 March 1994 official training in front of 20,000 people with two rounds were on schedule and third round was canceled due to strong wind. Before that 15 trial V-jumpers made practise test jumps. In the first round Christof Duffner crashed from a huge height at 207 metres (679 ft) metres world record distance. About 15 minutes later Espen Bredesen set the third and last world record that year at 209 metres (686 ft).

On 19 March 1994 first day of competition was on schedule but canceled due to strong. Unfortunate to 40,000 people visiting the event, crowd was very disappointed as they didn't manage to see a single jump that day.

On 20 March 1994 second day of competition was on schedule in front of 30,000 people and without any weather problems. The event marked the last time the 191 meters rule—jumps that exceeded the distance points didn't register further—was in use. At the time the single day event also counted for World Cup points and statistics. Only 2 of 4 jumps counted into final results. Czech Jaroslav Sakala became the world champion.

=== Practise ===
13:00 PM — 17 March 1994 — incomplete

| Bib | Name | 1RD | 2RD |
|---|---|---|---|
Test jumpers
| P1 | (Slovenia) Miran Tepeš | 163.0 m | N/A |
| P2 | (Slovenia) Tomaž Knafelj | N/A | N/A |
| P3 | (Slovenia) Aljoša Dolhar | 180.0 m | N/A |
| P12 | (Austria) Martin Höllwarth | 196.0 m | N/A |
Competitors
| 42 | (Austria) Andreas Goldberger | 202.0 m | 202.0 m |
| 57 | (Finland) Toni Nieminen | 203.0 m | 173.0 m |
| N/A | (Finland) Jani Soininen | 159.0 m | 178.0 m |
| N/A | (Finland) Janne Ahonen | 190.0 m | 168.0 m |
| N/A | (Slovenia) Jure Žagar | 156.0 m | 152.0 m |
| N/A | (Slovenia) Matjaž Kladnik | 172.0 m | 165.0 m |
| N/A | (Norway) Espen Bredesen | 174.0 m | 188.0 m |
| N/A | (Norway) Kurt Børset | 166.0 m | 167.0 m |
| N/A | (Czech Republic) Jaroslav Sakala | 170.0 m | N/A |
| N/A | (Austria) Werner Haim | N/A | 181.0 m |
| N/A | (Norway) Roar Ljøkelsøy | N/A | 179.0 m |
| N/A | Back | N/A | 180.0 m |

=== Official training ===
9:00 AM trial round — 18 March 1994 — incomplete — 43 on start list

| Bib | Name | 1RD | 2RD |
|---|---|---|---|
| 7 | (Japan) Noriaki Kasai | 174.0 m | N/A |
| 9 | (Slovenia) Jure Žagar | 149.0 m | 149.0 m |
| 11 | (Finland) Toni Nieminen | 187.0 m | N/A |
| 14 | (Italy) Roberto Cecon | N/A | 193.0 m |
| 17 | (Germany) Christof Duffner | 207.0 m | N/A |
| 18 | (Slovenia) Matjaž Zupan | 112.0 m | 124.0 m |
| 20 | (Norway) Espen Bredesen | 209.0 m | N/A |
| 25 | (Austria) Werner Rathmayr | N/A | 181.0 m |
| 32 | (Slovenia) Matjaž Kladnik | 167.0 m | 152.0 m |
| 36 | (Austria) Andreas Goldberger | — | 201.0 m |
| 37 | (Czech Republic) Jaroslav Sakala | 183.0 m | 200.0 m |
| 39 | (Slovenia) Samo Gostiša | 125.0 m | 135.0 m |
| N/A | (France) Jérôme Gay | 146.0 m | N/A |
| N/A | (France) Nicolas Jean-Prost | 174.0 m | N/A |
| N/A | (Slovenia) Dejan Jekovec | 124.0 m | 94.0 m |
| N/A | (Germany) Gerd Siegmund | 186.0 m | N/A |
| N/A | (Japan) Jinya Nishikata | 188.0 m | N/A |
| N/A | (Norway) Lasse Ottesen | N/A | 176.0 m |

== Official results ==
10:00 AM — 20 March 1994 — Two rounds — chronological order

| Rank | Bib | Name | D2 (20 March 1994) | | Points |
| Rank | Bib | Name | 1RD | 2RD | Points |
|---|---|---|---|---|---|
| 1st place, gold medalist(s) | 37 | (Czech Republic) Jaroslav Sakala | 189.0 m | 185.0 m | 351.3 |
| 2nd place, silver medalist(s) | 20 | (Norway) Espen Bredesen | 172.0 m | 182.0 m | 329.8 |
| 3rd place, bronze medalist(s) | 14 | (Italy) Roberto Cecon | 160.0 m | 199.0 m | 324.7 |
| 4 | 17 | (Germany) Christof Duffner | 159.0 m | 148.0 m | 266.4 |
| 5 | 4 | (Norway) Lasse Ottesen | 177.0 m | 129.0 m | 263.2 |
| 6 | 38 | (Switzerland) Stephan Zünd | 150.0 m | 140.0 m | 252.5 |
| 7 | 11 | (Finland) Toni Nieminen | 139.0 m | 156.0 m | 248.0 |
| 8 | 42 | (Norway) Kurt Børset | 122.0 m | 167.0 m | 245.3 |
| 9 | 23 | (Finland) Jani Soininen | 138.0 m | 149.0 m | 239.4 |
| 10 | | (Germany) Hansjörg Jäkle | 129.0 m | 153.0 m | 237.4 |
| 11 | 2 | (Japan) Takanobu Okabe | 198.0 m | 95.0 m | 235.2 |
| 12 | 5 | (Finland) Janne Ahonen | 120.0 m | 159.0 m | 228.8 |
| 13 | 36 | (Austria) Andreas Goldberger | 141.0 m | 128.0 m | 221.3 |
| 14 | 43 | (Finland) Janne Väätäinen | 126.0 m | 146.0 m | 216.9 |
| 15 | | (Switzerland) Sylvain Freiholz | 123.0 m | 139.0 m | 213.4 |
| 16 | 19 | (Austria) Werner Haim | 119.0 m | 132.0 m | 203.9 |
| 17 | | (Italy) Ivo Pertile | 137.0 m | 124.0 m | 201.2 |
| 18 | | (United States) Tad Langlois | 128.0 m | 125.0 m | 195.6 |
| 19 | 7 | (Japan) Noriaki Kasai | 153.0 m | 109.0 m | 177.9 |
| 20 | 24 | (Czech Republic) Tomáš Goder | 120.0 m | 117.0 m | 177.4 |
| | 33 | (France) Nicolas Jean-Prost | 131.0 m | 106.0 m | 177.4 |
| 22 | 13 | (Japan) Jinya Nishikata | 168.0 m | 95.0 m | 170.6 |
| 23 | | (Switzerland) Sepp Zehnder | 118.0 m | 110.0 m | 170.2 |
| 24 | 25 | (Austria) Werner Rathmayr | 114.0 m | 115.0 m | 168.3 |
| 25 | | (Switzerland) Bruno Reuteler | 108.0 m | 116.0 m | 162.8 |
| 26 | 35 | (Germany) Gerd Siegmund | 115.0 m | 113.0 m | 161.1 |
| 27 | 18 | (Slovenia) Matjaž Zupan | 108.0 m | 116.0 m | 156.3 |
| | 22 | (Czech Republic) Jakub Sucháček | 109.0 m | 115.0 m | 156.3 |
| 29 | | (France) Didier Mollard | 112.0 m | 106.0 m | 147.1 |
| 30 | 32 | (Slovenia) Matjaž Kladnik | 114.0 m | 101.0 m | 144.0 |
| 31 | | (Japan) Naoki Yasuzaki | 102.0 m | 110.0 m | 139.4 |
| 32 | | (Japan) Hiroya Saito | 103.0 m | 108.0 m | 137.7 |
| 33 | | (Austria) Andreas Beck | 95.0 m | 117.0 m | 136.4 |
| 34 | | (Slovenia) Samo Gostiša | 112.0 m | 96.0 m | 131.1 |
| 35 | | (Canada) John Lockyer | 103.0 m | 110.0 m | 128.6 |
| 36 | | (France) Jérôme Gay | 101.0 m | 101.0 m | 122.4 |
| 37 | | (Slovakia) Vladimír Roško | 98.0 m | 102.0 m | 120.5 |
| 38 | | (Norway) Ken Lesja | 99.0 m | 99.0 m | 115.1 |
| 39 | 8 | (Georgia (country)) Kakhaber Tsakadze | 88.0 m | 94.0 m | 99.4 |
| 40 | | (Slovenia) Jure Žagar | 83.0 m | 100.0 m | 95.6 |
| 41 | 30 | (Sweden) Johan Rasmussen | 124.0 m | 80.0 m | 94.8 |
| 42 | 34 | (Norway) Roar Ljøkelsøy | 94.0 m | 77.0 m | 76.7 |
| 43 | | (Canada) Jeremy Blackburn | 85.0 m | — | 39.0 |

Points were officially scored maximum as 191 metres jump.
World record. First official over 200 metres.
Crash at world record distance.
World record.
Fall.

== Ski flying world records ==
| Date | Name | Country | Metres | Feet |
|---|---|---|---|---|
| 17 March 1994 | Martin Höllwarth | Austria | 196 | 643 |
| 17 March 1994 | Andreas Goldberger | Austria | 202 | 663 |
| 17 March 1994 | Toni Nieminen | Finland | 203 | 666 |
| 18 March 1994 | Christof Duffner | Germany | 207 | 679 |
| 18 March 1994 | Espen Bredesen | Austria | 209 | 686 |

Not recognized! Touch. First ever jump over 200 metres in history.
First official (standing) jump over 200 metres in history.

== Medal table ==
| Rank | Nation | Gold | Silver | Bronze | Total |
|---|---|---|---|---|---|
| 1 | Czech Republic (CZE) | 1 | 0 | 0 | 1 |
| 2 | Norway (NOR) | 0 | 1 | 0 | 1 |
| 3 | Italy (ITA) | 0 | 0 | 1 | 1 |
| Totals (3 entries) | | 1 | 1 | 1 | 3 |
