= 1994 FIS Ski Jumping Grand Prix =

International ski jumping competition

Grand Prix 1994
Winners
- Overall: (Japan) Takanobu Okabe

Competitions
- Venues: 3
- Individual: 3
- Team: 1

The 1994 FIS Ski Jumping Grand Prix (official: Grand Prix – Three Countries Tournament), organized by the International Ski Federation (FIS), was the first Summer Grand Prix season in ski jumping on plastic mate, the highest level summer competition. Season began on 3 August 1994 in Hinterzarten, Germany and ended on 24 August 1994 in Stams, Austria.

Other competitive circuits this season included the World Cup and Continental Cup.

== Map of Grand Prix hosts ==
(Germany) Hinterzarten	(Italy) Predazzo	(Austria) Stams
Tremplin du Praz	Trampolino Dal Ben	Aigner-Schanze
Europe

== Calendar ==
=== Men ===
N – normal hill
All	No.	Date	Place (Hill)	Size	Winner	Second	Third	Overall leader	R.
1	1	28 August 1994	(Germany) Hinterzarten (Rothaus-Schanze K90)	N _{001}	(Japan) Takanobu Okabe	(France) Nicolas Dessum	(Germany) Jens Weißflog	(Japan) Takanobu Okabe	
2	2	1 September 1994	(Italy) Predazzo (Trampolino dal Ben K90)	N _{002}	(Japan) Takanobu Okabe	(Austria) Andreas Goldberger	(Finland) Ari-Pekka Nikkola	(Japan) Takanobu Okabe	
3	3	5 September 1994	(Austria) Stams (Brunnentalschanze K105)	N _{003}	(Japan) Takanobu Okabe	(Italy) Roberto Cecon	(Finland) Ari-Pekka Nikkola	(Japan) Takanobu Okabe	
1st FIS Grand Prix – Three Countries Tournament Overall (28 August – 5 September 1994)					(Japan) Takanobu Okabe	(Finland) Ari-Pekka Nikkola	(Austria) Andreas Goldberger		

=== Men's team ===
All	No.	Date	Place (Hill)	Size	Winner	Second	Third
1	1	28 August 1994	(Germany) Hinterzarten (Rothaus-Schanze K90)	N _{001}	Japan	Finland	Germany

== Standings ==
=== Overall ===
Rank	after 3 events	Points
	(Japan) Takanobu Okabe	746.5
2	(Finland) Ari-Pekka Nikkola	693.9
3	(Austria) Andreas Goldberger	668.3
4	(Czech Republic) Jiří Parma	666.7
5	(Germany) Jens Weißflog	656.6
