= 1994–95 Four Hills Tournament =

Ski jumping competition

The 1994-95 Four Hills Tournament took place at the four traditional venues of Oberstdorf, Garmisch-Partenkirchen, Innsbruck and Bischofshofen, located in Germany and Austria, between 30 December 1994 and 6 January 1995.

== Results ==
Date	Place	Hill	Size	Winner	Second	Third	Ref.
30 Dec 1994	(Germany) Oberstdorf	Schattenbergschanze K-115	LH	(Austria) Reinhard Schwarzenberger	(Austria) Andreas Goldberger	(Germany) Jens Weißflog	
1 Jan 1995	(Germany) Garmisch-Partenkirchen	Große Olympiaschanze K-107	LH	(Finland) Janne Ahonen	(Austria) Andreas Goldberger	(Finland) Jani Soininen	
4 Jan 1995	(Austria) Innsbruck	Bergiselschanze K-110	LH	(Japan) Kazuyoshi Funaki	(Austria) Andreas Goldberger	(Finland) Mika Laitinen	
6 Jan 1995	(Austria) Bischofshofen	Paul-Ausserleitner-Schanze K-120	LH	(Austria) Andreas Goldberger	(Italy) Roberto Cecon	(Germany) Dieter Thoma	

== Overall ==
Pos	Ski Jumper	Points
1	(Austria) Andreas Goldberger	955.4
2	(Japan) Kazuyoshi Funaki	932.0
3	(Finland) Janne Ahonen	896.3
4	(Finland) Ari-Pekka Nikkola	886.2
5	(France) Nicolas Dessum	870.3
6	(Finland) Jani Soininen	869.6
7	(Italy) Roberto Cecon	866.2
8	(Finland) Toni Nieminen	863.9
9	(France) Nicolas Jean-Prost	860.6
10	(Norway) Lasse Ottesen	839.8
