= Sturle =

Sturle is a given name. Notable people with the given name include:

- Sturle Dagsland, Norwegian singer
- Sturle Holseter (born 1976), Norwegian ski jumper
