= Vladimír Roško =

Slovak ski jumper

Vladimír Roško (born 1974) is a retired Slovak ski jumper.

He made his World Cup debut in January 1994, in the Four Hills Tournament race in Innsbruck, and later finished 37th at the 1994 Ski Flying World Championships. His most prolific World Cup season was the 1995–96 season. Finishing 26th at the 1998 Ski Flying World Championships, this was the first time he collected World Cup points. His last World Cup outing came in March 1998 in Lahti.
