= 1996 FIS Ski Jumping Grand Prix =

International ski jumping competition

Grand Prix 1996
Winners
- Overall: (Finland) Ari-Pekka Nikkola

Competitions
- Venues: 5
- Individual: 5

The 1996 FIS Ski Jumping Grand Prix was the 3rd Summer Grand Prix season in ski jumping on plastic. Season began on 18 August 1996 in Trondheim, Norway and ended on 1 September 1996 in Stams, Austria.

Other competitive circuits this season included the World Cup and Continental Cup.

== Calendar ==
=== Men ===
Num	Season	Date	Place	Hill	Size	Winner	Second	Third	Yellow bib
8	1	18 August 1996	(Norway) Trondheim	Granåsen K120	LH	(Finland) Ari-Pekka Nikkola	(Finland) Mika Laitinen	(Germany) Christof Duffner	(Finland) Ari-Pekka Nikkola
9	2	21 August 1996	(Germany) Oberhof	Hans-Renner-Schanze K120	LH	(Finland) Mika Laitinen	(Finland) Ari-Pekka Nikkola	(Poland) Adam Malysz	(Finland) Mika Laitinen (Finland) Ari-Pekka Nikkola
10	3	25 August 1996	(Germany) Hinterzarten	Rothaus-Schanze K90	NH	(Finland) Ari-Pekka Nikkola	(Finland) Mika Laitinen	(Poland) Adam Malysz	(Finland) Ari-Pekka Nikkola
11	4	28 August 1996	(Italy) Predazzo	Trampolino dal Ben K120	LH	(Japan) Masahiko Harada	(Finland) Ari-Pekka Nikkola	(Finland) Mika Laitinen	(Finland) Ari-Pekka Nikkola
12	5	1 September 1996	(Austria) Stams	Brunnentalschanze K105	NH	(Japan) Masahiko Harada	(Finland) Mika Laitinen	(Finland) Jani Soininen	(Finland) Ari-Pekka Nikkola

== Standings ==
=== Overall ===
Rank	after 5 events	Points
1	(Finland) Ari-Pekka Nikkola	405
2	(Finland) Mika Laitinen	400
3	(Japan) Masahiko Harada	280
4	(Finland) Jani Soininen	225
5	(Finland) Janne Ahonen	156

=== Nations Cup ===
Rank	after 5 events	Points
1	Finland	1245
2	Japan	764
3	Norway	311
4	Germany	282
5	Czech Republic	213
