= 1994–95 FIS Ski Jumping World Cup =

Ski jumping championship season

1994–95 World Cup
Winners
- Overall: (Austria) Andreas Goldberger
- Ski Flying: (Austria) Andreas Goldberger
- Four Hills Tournament: (Austria) Andreas Goldberger
- Nations Cup: Finland

Competitions
- Venues: 15
- Individual: 21
- Team: 1
- Cancelled: 3 (Men), 1 (Team)

The 1994–95 FIS Ski Jumping World Cup was the 16th World Cup season in ski jumping and the 5th official World Cup season in ski flying with the fifth small crystal globe awarded.

The season began in Planica, Slovenia on 10 December 1994 and finished in Oberstdorf, Germany on 25 February 1995. The individual World Cup overall winner was Austrian ski jumper Andreas Goldberger (2nd time in his career) and the Nations Cup was taken by Team of Finland.

21 men's individual events on 15 different venues in 9 countries were held on two different continents (Europe and Asia); three individual events were cancelled due to very bad weather conditions (a lack or too much snow) in Predazzo, Courchevel and Oberstdorf; and one moved from normal to large hill in Falun. Also, one men's team event was held (one cancelled).

Peaks of the season were FIS Nordic World Ski Championships, first and only time in history that Nordic World Championships was held after the end of the season WC season (inconvenient as they had to move to another continent, to Canada) and Four Hills Tournament.

== Map of world cup hosts ==
Europe
Germany	Austria	Asia

== Calendar ==
=== Men's Individual ===
N – normal hill / L – large hill / F – flying hill
All	No.	Date	Place (Hill)	Size	Winner	Second	Third	Overall leader	R.
333	1	10 December 1994	(Slovenia) Planica (Srednja Bloudkova K90)	N _{113}	(Japan) Kazuyoshi Funaki	(Austria) Andreas Goldberger	(Finland) Janne Ahonen	(Japan) Kazuyoshi Funaki	
334	2	11 December 1994	(Slovenia) Planica (Srednja Bloudkova K90)	N _{114}	(Austria) Andreas Goldberger	(Finland) Mika Laitinen	(Norway) Lasse Ottesen	(Austria) Andreas Goldberger	
		14 December 1994	(Italy) Predazzo (Trampolino dal Ben K120)	L _{cnx}	cancelled due to lack of snow all across Europe (Planica was ready to replace both, but FIS rejected them)			—	
		18 December 1994	(France) Courchevel (Tremplin du Praz K120)	L _{cnx}	cancelled due to lack of snow all across Europe (Planica was ready to replace both, but FIS rejected them)			—	
335	3	30 December 1994	(Germany) Oberstdorf (Schattenbergschanze K115)	L _{194}	(Austria) R. Schwarzenberger	(Austria) Andreas Goldberger	(Germany) Jens Weißflog	(Austria) Andreas Goldberger	
336	4	1 January 1995	(Germany) Garmisch-Pa (Große Olympiaschanze K107)	L _{195}	(Finland) Janne Ahonen	(Austria) Andreas Goldberger	(Finland) Jani Soininen	(Austria) Andreas Goldberger	
337	5	4 January 1995	(Austria) Innsbruck (Bergiselschanze K110)	L _{196}	(Japan) Kazuyoshi Funaki	(Austria) Andreas Goldberger	(Finland) Mika Laitinen	(Austria) Andreas Goldberger	
338	6	6 January 1995	(Austria) Bischofshofen (Paul-Ausserleitner K120)	L _{197}	(Austria) Andreas Goldberger	(Italy) Roberto Cecon	(Germany) Dieter Thoma	(Austria) Andreas Goldberger	
43rd Four Hills Tournament Overall (30 December 1994 – 6 January 1995)					(Austria) Andreas Goldberger	(Japan) Kazuyoshi Funaki	(Finland) Janne Ahonen	4H Tournament	
339	7	8 January 1995	(Germany) Willingen (Mühlenkopfschanze K120)	L _{198}	(Austria) Andreas Goldberger	(Japan) Kazuyoshi Funaki	(Germany) Dieter Thoma	(Austria) Andreas Goldberger	
340	8	14 January 1995	(Switzerland) Engelberg (Gross-Titlis-Schanze K120)	L _{199}	(Italy) Roberto Cecon	(Finland) Janne Ahonen	(Finland) Jani Soininen	(Austria) Andreas Goldberger	
341	9	15 January 1995	(Switzerland) Engelberg (Gross-Titlis-Schanze K120)	L _{200}	(Italy) Roberto Cecon	(Austria) Andreas Goldberger	(Finland) Janne Ahonen	(Austria) Andreas Goldberger	
342	10	21 January 1995	(Japan) Sapporo (Miyanomori K90) (Ōkurayama K115)	N _{115}	(Austria) Andreas Goldberger	(Finland) Janne Ahonen	(Finland) Ari-Pekka Nikkola (Japan) Takanobu Okabe	(Austria) Andreas Goldberger	
343	11	22 January 1995	(Japan) Sapporo (Miyanomori K90) (Ōkurayama K115)	L _{201}	(France) Nicolas Dessum	(Japan) Takanobu Okabe	(Finland) Janne Ahonen	(Austria) Andreas Goldberger	
344	12	28 January 1995	(Finland) Lahti (Salpausselkä K90, K114)	N _{116}	(Austria) Andreas Goldberger	(Germany) Jens Weißflog	(Finland) Jani Soininen	(Austria) Andreas Goldberger	
345	13	29 January 1995	(Finland) Lahti (Salpausselkä K90, K114)	L _{202}	(Germany) Jens Weißflog	(Czech Republic) Jakub Sucháček	(Japan) Kazuyoshi Funaki	(Austria) Andreas Goldberger	
346	14	1 February 1995	(Finland) Kuopio (Puijo K90)	N _{117}	(Finland) Toni Nieminen	(Austria) R. Schwarzenberger	(Germany) Jens Weißflog	(Austria) Andreas Goldberger	
347	15	4 February 1995	(Sweden) Falun (Lugnet K90, K120)	N _{118}	(Italy) Roberto Cecon	(Japan) Takanobu Okabe	(Germany) Jens Weißflog	(Austria) Andreas Goldberger	
		5 February 1995	(Sweden) Falun (Lugnet K90, K120)	L _{cnx}	postponed from large to normal hill due to strong wind (later the fear proved to be exaggerated, as the wind calmed down)			—	
348	16	(Note: Cancelled large hill event from Falun (5 February) was moved to normal hill on the same day.)5 February 1995	(Sweden) Falun (Lugnet K90, K120)	N _{119}	(Norway) Espen Bredesen	(Finland) Jani Soininen	(Japan) Naoto Itō (Japan) Kazuyoshi Funaki	(Austria) Andreas Goldberger	
349	17	8 February 1995	(Norway) Lillehammer (Lysgårdsbakken K120)	L _{203}	(Austria) Andreas Goldberger	(Japan) Takanobu Okabe	(Italy) Roberto Cecon	(Austria) Andreas Goldberger	
350	18	12 February 1995	(Norway) Oslo (Holmenkollbakken K110)	L _{204}	(Austria) Andreas Goldberger	(Japan) Takanobu Okabe	(Germany) Jens Weißflog	(Austria) Andreas Goldberger	
351	19	18 February 1995	(Norway) Vikersund (Vikersundbakken K175)	F _{028}	(Austria) Andreas Goldberger	(Japan) Takanobu Okabe	(Norway) Lasse Ottesen	(Austria) Andreas Goldberger	
352	20	19 February 1995	(Norway) Vikersund (Vikersundbakken K175)	F _{029}	(Austria) Andreas Goldberger	(Japan) Takanobu Okabe	(Italy) Roberto Cecon	(Austria) Andreas Goldberger	
353	21	25 February 1995	(Germany) Oberstdorf (Heini-Klopfer K182)	F _{030}	(Austria) Andreas Goldberger	(Italy) Roberto Cecon	(Germany) Jens Weißflog	(Austria) Andreas Goldberger	
		26 February 1995	(Germany) Oberstdorf (Heini-Klopfer K182)	F _{cnx}	cancelled in first round after 10 competitors; due to heavy snowfall			—	
16th FIS World Cup Overall (10 December 1994 – 25 February 1995)					(Austria) Andreas Goldberger	(Italy) Roberto Cecon	(Finland) Janne Ahonen	World Cup Overall	
FIS Nordic World Ski Championships 1995 (12 – 18 March • (Canada) Thunder Bay)

=== Men's Team ===
All	No.	Date	Place (Hill)	Size	Winner	Second	Third	R.
		17 December 1994	(France) Courchevel (Tremplin du Praz K120)	L _{cnx}	cancelled due to lack of snow all across Europe			
7	1	28 January 1995	(Finland) Lahti (Salpausselkä K114)	L _{007}	Finland Mika Laitinen; Ari-Pekka Nikkola; Jani Soininen; Janne Ahonen	Austria Andreas Widhölzl; Christian Moser; Reinhard Schwarzenberger; Andreas Goldberger	Japan Naoki Yasuzaki; Jinya Nishikata; Kazuyoshi Funaki; Takanobu Okabe	

== Standings ==
=== Overall ===
Rank	after 21 events	Points
1	(Austria) Andreas Goldberger	1571
2	(Italy) Roberto Cecon	935
3	(Finland) Janne Ahonen	869
4	(Japan) Kazuyoshi Funaki	843
5	(Japan) Takanobu Okabe	821
6	(Germany) Jens Weißflog	683
7	(Finland) Jani Soininen	606
8	(Finland) Ari-Pekka Nikkola	572
9	(Finland) Mika Laitinen	564
10	(Norway) Lasse Ottesen	472

=== Ski Flying ===
Rank	after 3 events	Points
1	(Austria) Andreas Goldberger	300
2	(Japan) Takanobu Okabe	189
3	(Italy) Roberto Cecon	185
4	(Norway) Lasse Ottesen	123
5	(Finland) Janne Ahonen	100
6	(Finland) Mika Laitinen	98
7	(Japan) Kazuyoshi Funaki	90
8	(Czech Republic) Jakub Sucháček	83
9	(Czech Republic) Zbynek Krompolc	79
10	(Finland) Ari-Pekka Nikkola	76

=== Nations Cup ===
Rank	after 22 events	Points
1	Finland	3457
2	Austria	2689
3	Japan	2610
4	Germany	1864
5	Norway	1247
6	France	1112
7	Italy	964
8	Czech Republic	786
9	Slovenia	699
10	Switzerland	354

=== Four Hills Tournament ===
Rank	after 4 events	Points
1	(Austria) Andreas Goldberger	955.4
2	(Japan) Kazuyoshi Funaki	932.0
3	(Finland) Janne Ahonen	896.3
4	(Finland) Ari-Pekka Nikkola	886.2
5	(France) Nicolas Dessum	870.3
6	(Finland) Jani Soininen	869.6
7	(Italy) Roberto Cecon	866.2
8	(Finland) Toni Nieminen	863.9
9	(France) Nicolas Jean-Prost	860.6
10	(Norway) Lasse Ottesen	839.8

== See also ==
- 1994 Grand Prix (top level summer series)
- 1994–95 FIS Continental Cup (2nd level competition)
