= 1993–94 Four Hills Tournament =

Ski jumping competition

The 1993-94 Four Hills Tournament took place at the four traditional venues of Oberstdorf, Garmisch-Partenkirchen, Innsbruck and Bischofshofen, located in Germany and Austria, between 30 December 1993 and 6 January 1994.

== Results ==
Date	Place	Hill	Size	Winner	Second	Third	Ref.
30 Dec 1993	(Germany) Oberstdorf	Schattenbergschanze K-115	LH	(Germany) Jens Weißflog	(Norway) Espen Bredesen	(Austria) Andreas Goldberger	
1 Jan 1994	(Germany) Garmisch-Partenkirchen	Große Olympiaschanze K-107	LH	(Norway) Espen Bredesen	(Germany) Jens Weißflog	(Japan) Takanobu Okabe	
4 Jan 1994	(Austria) Innsbruck	Bergiselschanze K-109	LH	(Austria) Andreas Goldberger	(Germany) Jens Weißflog	(Japan) Noriaki Kasai	
6 Jan 1994	(Austria) Bischofshofen	Paul-Ausserleitner-Schanze K-120	LH	(Norway) Espen Bredesen	(Japan) Noriaki Kasai	(Germany) Jens Weißflog	

== Overall ==
Pos	Ski Jumper	Points
1	(Norway) Espen Bredesen	931.3
2	(Germany) Jens Weissflog	923.3
3	(Austria) Andreas Goldberger	891.8
4	(Japan) Noriaki Kasai	848.2
5	(Czech Republic) Jaroslav Sakala	845.5
6	(Italy) Roberto Cecon	841.8
7	(Austria) Heinz Kuttin	815.1
8	(Germany) Dieter Thoma	781.6
9	(Finland) Janne Väätäinen	771.2
10	(Norway) Roar Ljøkelsøy	754.9
