= Ingo Züchner =

East German ski jumper (born 1969)

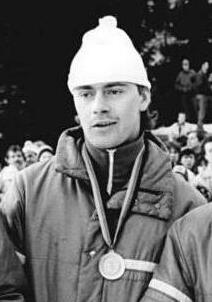
- Züchner in 1989

Personal information
- Full name: Ingo Züchner
- Born: 11 September 1969 (age 57)

Sport
- Sport: Skiing

World Cup career
- Seasons: 1989–1990
- Indiv. podiums: 1
- Updated on 30 March 2015

Ingo Züchner (born 11 September 1969) is a retired East German ski jumper.
