= Kurt Børset =

Norwegian ski jumper

Personal information
- Born: 21 May 1973 (age 53)

Sport
- Sport: Skiing
- Club: Løkken IF

World Cup career
- Seasons: 1994-1995, 1998
- Indiv. podiums: 0
- Indiv. wins: 0
- Updated on 3 January 2009

Kurt Børset (born 21 May 1973) is a Norwegian former ski jumper.

In the World Cup he finished once among the top 10, with an eighth place from Planica in March 1994, which doubled as the FIS Ski Flying World Championships 1994.

He lives in Løkken Verk.
