= Tomaž Knafelj =

Slovenian snowboarder (born 1972)

Personal information
- Nationality: Slovenian
- Born: 11 April 1972 (age 52); Jesenice, Yugoslavia

Sport
- Sport: Snowboarding

Tomaž Knafelj (born 11 April 1972) is a Slovenian snowboarder. He competed at the 2002 Winter Olympics and the 2006 Winter Olympics.
