= Arve Vorvik =

Norwegian ski jumper (born 1974)

Personal information
- Born: 7 January 1974 (age 52)

Sport
- Sport: Skiing
- Club: Byåsen IL

World Cup career
- Seasons: 1995–1997
- Indiv. podiums: 0
- Indiv. wins: 0
- Updated on 3 January 2009

Arve Vorvik (born 7 January 1974) is a retired Norwegian ski jumper.

In the World Cup he finished once among the top 10, with an eighth place from Iron Mountain in February 1996.

He participated in the 1995 World Championships in Thunder Bay, where he finished 28th in the large hill.

He resides in Trondheim.
