= John Lockyer =

John Lockyer is a Canadian retired ski jumper.

He made his World Cup debut in March 1990 in Lahti, finishing a measly 73rd. Later that year, at the onset of the 1990–91 World Cup circuit, he collected his first World Cup points with a 29th place in Lake Placid. Competing prolifically, he improved to 25th place in December 1991 in Thunder Bay. His last World Cup outing was the March 1994 race in the same location. Lockyer also competed at the 1991 World Championships, the 1993 World Championships, the 1994 Ski Flying World Championships and the 1995 World Championships with overall low finishes.
