= Pekka Niemelä =

Finnish ski jumper and coach

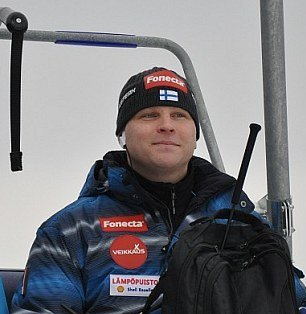
Pekka Niemelä, 2011

Pekka Niemelä (born 1974 in Helsinki) is a Finnish ski jumping coach and a former ski jumper.

In 1991 Niemelä was a part of Finnish silver medal team in 1991 junior World Championships in Reit im Winkl.

Niemelä started his coaching career in Puijon Hiihtoseura in 1997. From 2001 to 2002 he was the coach of Finland B national team, and between 2002 and 2006 he was the head coach of Japanese team Team Tsuchiya, most known of Noriaki Kasai’s successor. In 2006 Niemelä took over as the head coach of French national team. In March 2010 he was appointed as the new head coach of the Finnish national team. From 2014 until 2018 he was a head coach of Turkish national team and an advisor for Turkish Ski Federation. From 2018 until 2019 he was a head coach of Team China. From 2019 from now on Pekka Niemelä has been lead Puijo tourist area as an CEO.

== Sources ==
- Pekka Niemelä at the International Ski and Snowboard Federation
- Skimuseum.fr profile
