= Andreas Scherer =

German ski jumper

Personal information
- Full name: Andreas Scherer

Sport
- Sport: Skiing

World Cup career
- Seasons: 1989–1995
- Indiv. podiums: 1 Team
- Updated on 30 Mar 2015

Andreas Scherer is a West German and later German former ski jumper.
