= Clas Brede Bråthen =

Norwegian ski jumper

Medal record

Men's ski jumping

Representing Norway

World Championships
Silver medal – second place	1989 Lahti	Team large hill

Clas Brede Bråthen (born 28 November 1968) is a Norwegian ski jumper who competed from 1986 to 1994. He won a silver medal in the team large hill event at the 1989 FIS Nordic World Ski Championships and finished 11th in the individual large hill at those same games.

Bråthen's best individual finish was third twice (1986, 1988).
