= Sepp Zehnder =

Swiss ski jumper

Sepp Zehnder (born 1974) is a retired Swiss ski jumper.

He made his World Cup in January 1992 in Engelberg. He finished 23rd at the 1994 Ski Flying World Championships, which also counted as a World Cup race, and Zehnder thus collected his first World Cup points. He repeated the 23rd place in the February 1995 Falun World Cup race. Zehnder continued competing sporadically until 1998. Finishing 44th at the 1998 Ski Flying World Championships, it was his last World Cup outing.
