= Andreas Beck (ski jumper) =

Austrian ski jumper and snowboarder

Andreas Beck (born 1974) is a retired Austrian ski jumper and snowboarder.

He made his Ski jumping World Cup debut in January 1992 in Bischofshofen, also collecting his first World Cup points with a 30th place. In the 1993-94 Four Hills Tournament he improved to a 22nd place in Oberstdorf and 17th place in Bischofshofen, and then improved even further to 14th in January 1994 in Liberec. Beck also finished 33rd at the 1994 Ski Flying World Championships. His last World Cup outing came in February 1995 in Vikersund.

Beck then became a snowboarder, competing in the 1997 FIS Snowboarding World Championships as well as FIS Snowboard World Cup races in 1997 and 1998.
