= Sturle Holseter =

Norwegian ski jumper

Personal information
- Born: 9 April 1976 (age 50)

Sport
- Sport: Skiing
- Club: Vikersund IF

World Cup career
- Seasons: 1990-1991, 1995-1998
- Indiv. podiums: 1
- Indiv. wins: 0
- Updated on 3 January 2009

Sturle Holseter (born 9 April 1976) is a retired Norwegian ski jumper.

In the World Cup he finished once among the top 3, with a second place from Sapporo in January 1997. He finished among the top 10 a further four times.

He participated in the 1997 World Championships in Trondheim, where he finished fifteenth in the normal hill.
