= Werner Schuster (sportsman) =

Austrian ski jumper and coach

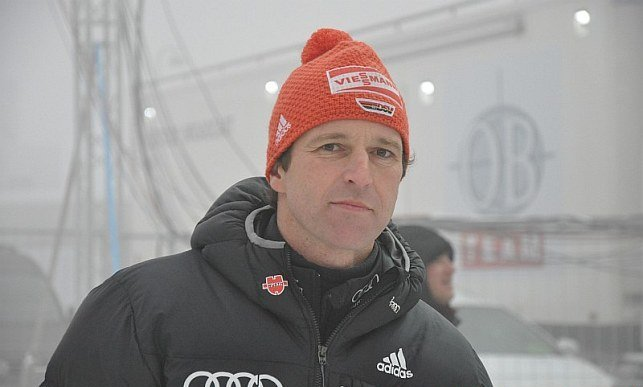

Werner Schuster (born 4 September 1969 in Hirschegg) is an Austrian ski jumping coach and a former ski jumper who competed from 1987 to 1995. He was the head coach of the German ski jumping national team from 2008 to 2019.

From 1998 to 2007, he worked as a coach in Stams ski school (Schigymnasium Stams). In 2007 he became the head coach of Swiss ski jumping national team. In March 2008 Schuster was appointed as the head coach of the German national team, replacing Peter Rohwein.

Werner Schuster is married and has two children.
