= Klaus Huber (ski jumper) =

Austrian ski jumper (born 1968)

Personal information
- Born: 1968 (age 57–58)

Sport
- Sport: Skiing

World Cup career
- Seasons: 1988-1995
- Indiv. wins: 0
- Updated on September 5, 2014

Klaus Huber (born 1968) is a retired Austrian ski jumper.

In the World Cup he finished twice among the top 10, his best result being a seventh place from Tauplitz in February 1991.

He finished third overall in the 1993-1994 Continental Cup.
