= Ronny Hornschuh =

German ski jumper

Personal information
- Born: 2 February 1975 (age 51) Neuhaus am Rennweg, East Germany

Sport
- Sport: Skiing
- Club: SCM Zella-Mehlis

World Cup career
- Seasons: 1998-2000
- Indiv. podiums: 1
- Indiv. wins: 0

Ronny Hornschuh (born 2 February 1975) is a German former ski jumper. Currently he is the head coach of the Switzerland ski jumping team.

In the World Cup he finished four times among the top 10, with a second place from Harrachov in December 1998 as his best result. He finished second overall in the Continental Cup in the 1993/94 season.
