= Naoto Itō =

Japanese ski jumper

Personal information
- Full name: Naoto Itō
- Born: 15 August 1969 (age 57) Sapporo, Japan

Sport
- Sport: Skiing

World Cup career
- Seasons: 1992; 1995–1998
- Indiv. podiums: 1
- Updated on 30 Mar 2015

Naoto Itō (伊藤 直人, Itō Naoto; born 15 August 1969) is a Japanese former ski jumper.
