= Trampolino di Pakstall =

Ski jumping

Coordinates: 45.8962°N 11.5491°E

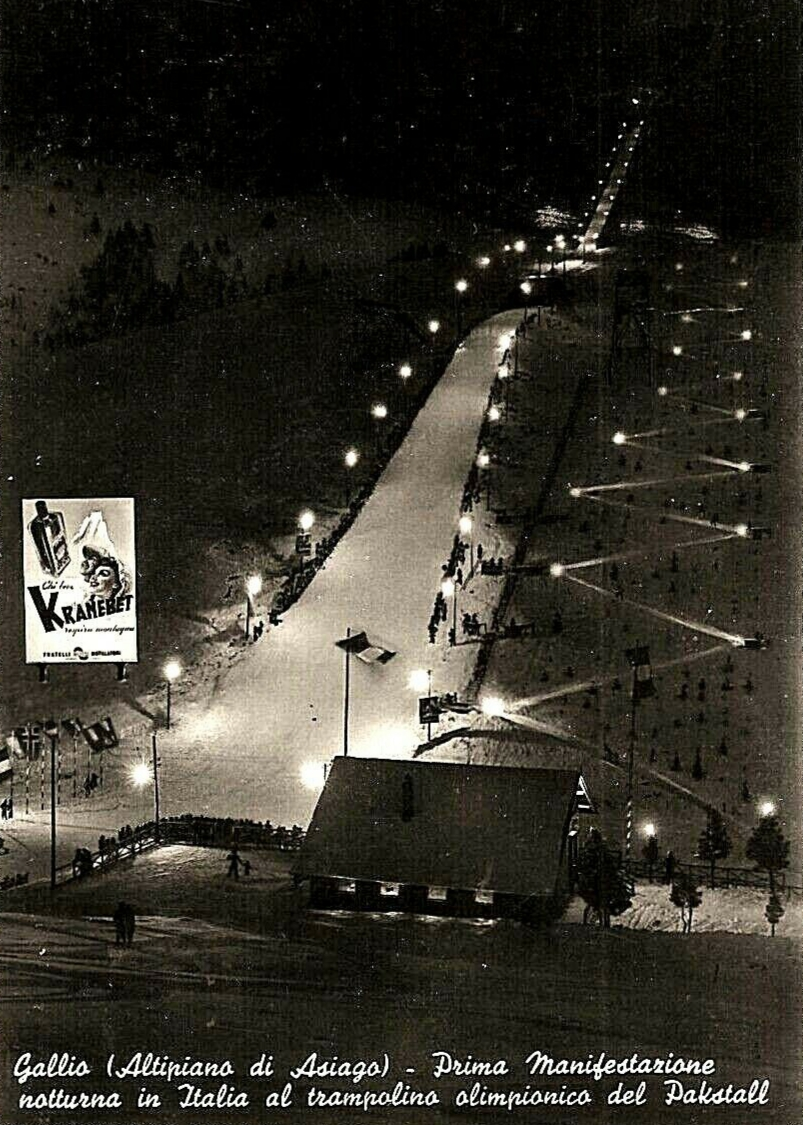
- Location: Gallio; Italy
- Opened: 1983

Size
- K–point: K-88
- Hill size: HS 95
- Hill record: 105.5 m (364 ft) (Slovenia) Uroš Peterka (10 February 2002)

Trampolino di Pakstall is a ski jumping normal hill in Gallio, Italy.

== History ==
It was opened in 1983 and owned by Sci Club Gallio. It hosted one FIS Ski jumping World Cup event in 1988. Uroš Peterka holds the hill record.

== World Cup ==
=== Men ===
Date	Size	Winner	Second	Third
17 Jan 1988	K-95	(Austria) Ernst Vettori	(Socialist Federal Republic of Yugoslavia) Primož Ulaga	(Czechoslovakia) Jiří Parma
