= Felix Gottwald Ski Jumping Stadium =

Sports venue in Uttenhofen, Saalfelden, Austria

Coordinates: 47°26′04″N 12°48′52″E

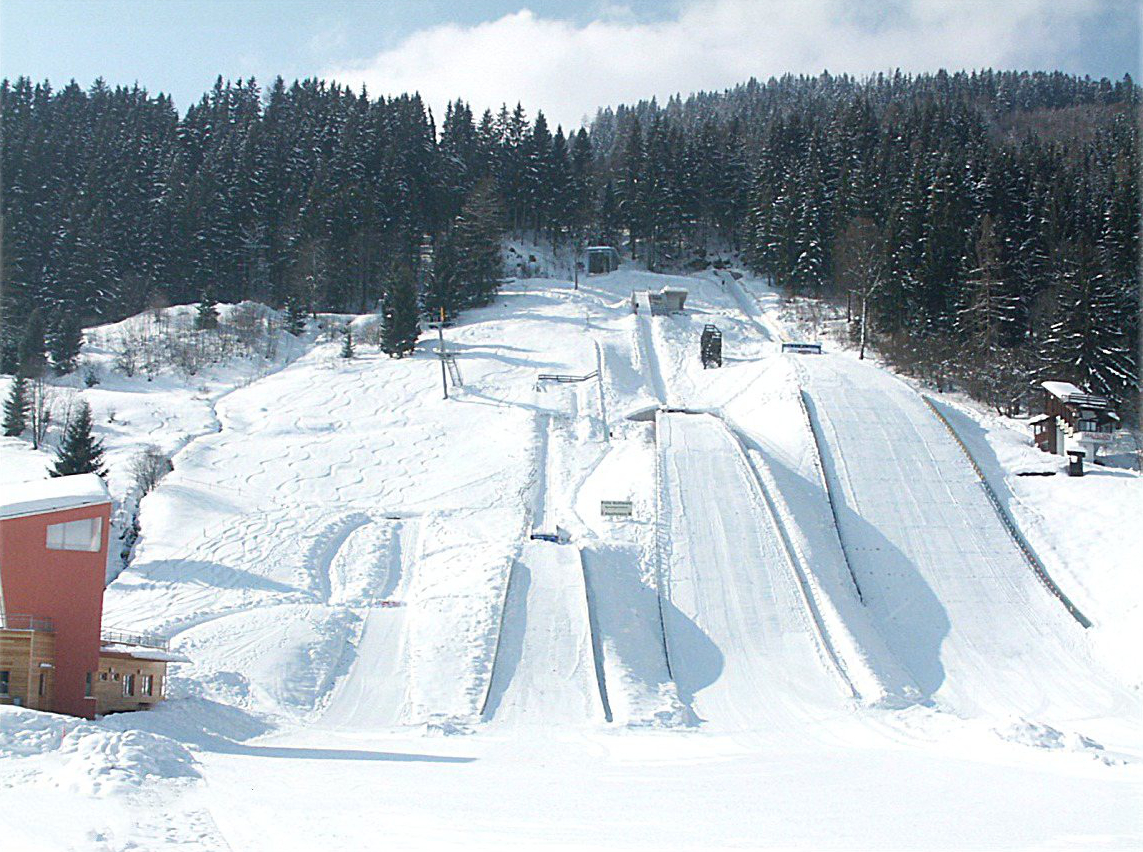
- Site in winter
- Location: Saalfelden; Austria
- Operator: Schiklub Saalfelden
- Opened: 1970
- Renovated: 1986 & 2004

Size
- K–point: 85 m
- Hill size: HS 95
- Hill record: 98.0 m (Japan) Kazuki Nishishita, 3 February 1999, JWSC
- Other jumps: K 15, K 30, K 60

The Felix Gottwald Ski Jump Stadium (German: Felix-Gottwald-Schisprungstadion) is located in the village of Uttenhofen in the borough of Saalfelden in the Austrian state of Salzburg. It has four jumps of categories K 15, K 30, K 60 and K 85.

== History ==
On the Biberg hill in Uttenhofen there were 2 jumps built in the 1970s. In Saalfelden itself, between 1950 and 1980, there were the Ritzensee Ski Jump and the Drei Tannen Ski Jump, both operated by the local ski club, SK Saalfelden, and the Army Sports Club. The Biberg Ski Jump was added in 1986. In 2004 the K 45 jump was upgraded into a K 60 and the two smaller jumps were fitted with matting for summer ski jumping. The new K 60 was finally opened on 10 October 2004 and the ski jumping centre was renamed as the Felix Gottwald Ski Jumping Stadium in honour of the Nordic combination skier, Felix Gottwald, who was a member of the Saalfelden Ski Club. In addition, the Nordic Junior World Championships were held here in 1988 and 1999.

Today the K 15, K 30 and K 60 jumps are fitted with mats and usable in the summer, while the K85 is only open in winter. There is a gondola lift serving the jumps. The central operations building has an integrated jump judges tower, changing rooms, ablutions, a wax workshop, workshop for the jump keepers and a large multi-purpose room. On the roof is a large terrace from where spectators have a clear view of the jumps.
