= Reinhard Schwarzenberger =

Austrian ski jumper

Personal information
- Nationality: Austria
- Born: 7 January 1977 (age 49) Saalfelden am Steinernen; Meer, Austria
- Height: 172 cm (5 ft 8 in)

Sport
- Sport: Skiing

World Cup career
- Seasons: 1995–2006
- Indiv. starts: 202
- Indiv. podiums: 7
- Indiv. wins: 2
- Team starts: 4
- Team podiums: 4
- Team wins: 1

Achievements and titles
- Personal bests: 202 m (663 ft); Oberstdorf, 16-17 March 2001
Medal record
Men's ski jumping
Olympic Games
Bronze medal – third place	1998 Nagano	Team LH
FIS Nordic World Ski Championships
Bronze medal – third place	1999 Ramsau	Team LH
- Updated on 10 February 2016

Reinhard Schwarzenberger (born 7 January 1977) is an Austrian former ski jumper.

== Career ==
He won a bronze medal in the team large hill at the 1998 Winter Olympics of Nagano. Schwarzenberger also won a bronze medal in the team large hill at the 1999 FIS Nordic World Ski Championships in Ramsau.

== World Cup ==
=== Standings ===
Season	Overall	4H	SF	NT	JP
1994/95	14	16	9	N/A	N/A
1995/96	9	3rd place, bronze medalist(s)	—	N/A	10
1996/97	31	19	33	41	25
1997/98	21	11	13	36	21
1998/99	15	13	6	7	17
1999/00	30	34	39	14	32
2000/01	34	39	21	34	N/A
2001/02	—	—	N/A	—	N/A
2002/03	27	35	N/A	22	N/A
2003/04	36	31	N/A	53	N/A
2004/05	74	45	N/A	—	N/A
2005/06	41	36	N/A	—	N/A

=== Wins ===
No.	Season	Date	Location	Hill	Size
1	1994/95	30 December 1994	(Germany) Oberstdorf	Schattenbergschanze K115	LH
2	1995/96	1 January 1996	(Germany) Garmisch-Partenkirchen	Große Olympiaschanze K107	LH
