= Espen Bredesen =

Norwegian ski jumper (born 1968)

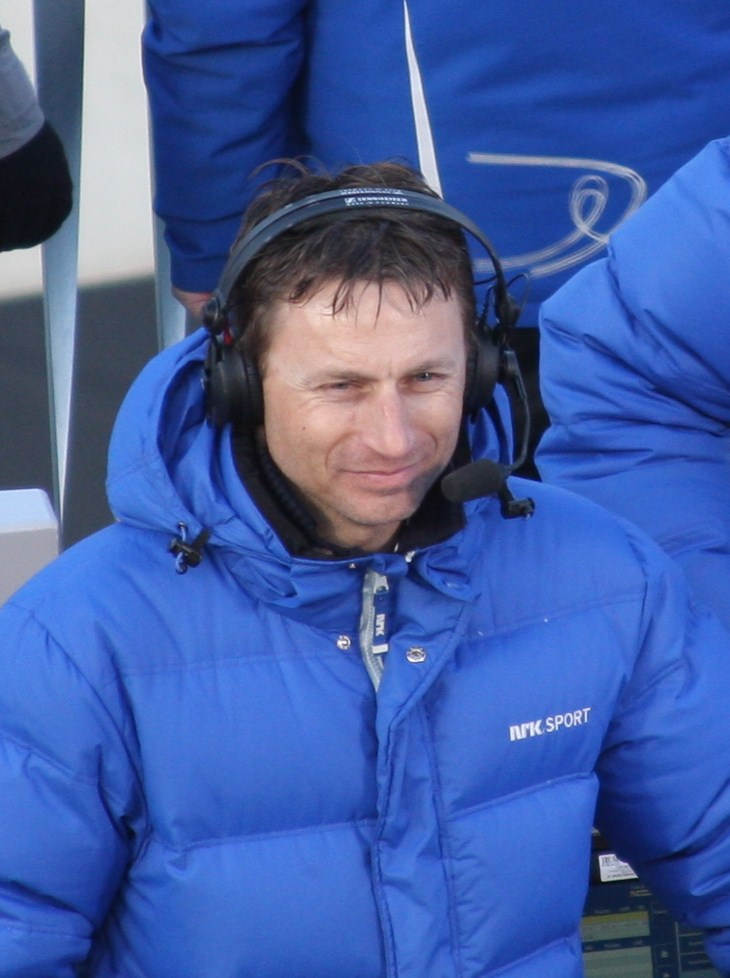

Personal information
- Nationality: Norway
- Born: 2 February 1968 (age 58) Oslo, Norway
- Height: 1.76 m (5 ft 9 in)

Sport
- Sport: Skiing

World Cup career
- Seasons: 1989–1999
- Indiv. starts: 156
- Indiv. podiums: 21
- Indiv. wins: 8
- Team starts: 8
- Team podiums: 5
- Overall titles: 1 (1994)
- Four Hills titles: 1 (1994)

Achievements and titles
- Personal bests: 210 m (689 ft); Planica, 22 March 1997
Medal record
Men's ski jumping
Olympic Games
Gold medal – first place	1994 Lillehammer	Individual NH
Silver medal – second place	1994 Lillehammer	Individual LH
FIS Nordic World Ski Championships
Gold medal – first place	1993 Falun	Individual LH
Gold medal – first place	1993 Falun	Team LH
Men's ski flying
FIS Ski Flying World Championships
Silver medal – second place	1994 Planica	Individual
- Updated on 10 February 2016

Espen Bredesen (born 2 February 1968) is a Norwegian former ski jumper.

== Career ==
At World Cup level he won gold and silver medals at the 1994 Winter Olympics at Lillehammer.

At the 1992 Winter Olympics, he performed badly, coming last in the normal hill and 57th out of 59 on the large hill. He had converted from the parallel technique to the V-style just a month previously. His poor performance gave him the nickname "Espen the Eagle", based on British ski jumper Eddie 'the Eagle' Edwards.

At the FIS Nordic World Ski Championships 1993 in Falun, he won gold medals both in the team large hill and the individual large hill events. In the 1993/94 season, he won the Four Hills Tournament. He won gold and silver medals at the 1994 Winter Olympics at Lillehammer, and won a silver medal at the FIS Ski-Flying World Championships 1994 in Planica. Bredesen twice beat the world ski flying record with jumps of 209 meters (1994) and 210 meters (1997).

Bredesen also won the ski jumping competition at the Holmenkollen ski festival in 1993. He was awarded the Holmenkollen medal in 1994 (shared with Ljubov Egorova and Vladimir Smirnov).

== World Cup ==
=== Standings ===
Season	Overall	4H	SF	NT	JP
1989/90	—	—	—	N/A	N/A
1990/91	34	21	23	N/A	N/A
1991/92	34	26	18	N/A	N/A
1992/93	5	33	5	N/A	N/A
1993/94	1st place, gold medalist(s)	1st place, gold medalist(s)	2nd place, silver medalist(s)	N/A	N/A
1994/95	15	21	13	N/A	N/A
1995/96	13	21	10	N/A	13
1996/97	16	20	11	31	19
1997/98	43	45	26	—	55
1998/99	101	—	—	55	99
1999/00	79	—	—	—	76

=== Wins ===
No.	Season	Date	Location	Hill	Size
1	1992/93	11 March 1993	(Norway) Lillehammer	Lysgårdsbakken K120	LH
2	1992/93	14 March 1993	(Norway) Oslo	Holmenkollbakken K110	LH
3	1992/93	28 March 1993	(Slovenia) Planica	Bloudkova velikanka K120	LH
4	1993/94	11 December 1993	(Slovenia) Planica	Srednja Bloudkova K90	NH
5	1993/94	1 January 1994	(Germany) Garmisch-Partenkirchen	Große Olympiaschanze K107	LH
6	1993/94	6 January 1994	(Austria) Bischofshofen	Paul-Ausserleitner-Schanze K120	LH
7	1993/94	15 January 1994	(Czech Republic) Liberec	Ještěd B K120	LH
8	1994/95	5 February 1995	(Sweden) Falun	Lugnet K90 (night)	NH

== Ski jumping world record ==
Date	Hill	Location	Metres	Feet
18 March 1994	Velikanka bratov Gorišek K185	Planica, Slovenia	209	686
22 March 1997	Velikanka bratov Gorišek K185	Planica, Slovenia	210	689

== World record statement ==
Bredesen's statement after his first world record in Planica 1994 when he jumped 209m:

Without any doubt this is my greatest life and career achievement. Nothing can compare with this world record. Not even my Olympic or world championships gold. Now I know how birds feel when they fly in the air.

Records
Preceded by Toni Nieminen	World's longest ski jump 18 March 1994 – 22 March 1997	Succeeded by Lasse Ottesen
