= Mika Laitinen =

Finnish ski jumper

Personal information
- Full name: Mika Antero Laitinen
- Nationality: Finland
- Born: 5 April 1973 (age 53) Kuopio, Finland
- Height: 185 cm (6 ft 1 in)

Sport
- Sport: Skiing

World Cup career
- Seasons: 1990–1993; 1995–2000
- Indiv. starts: 144
- Indiv. podiums: 11
- Indiv. wins: 5
- Team starts: 5
- Team podiums: 4
- Team wins: 4

Achievements and titles
- Personal bests: 189 m (620 ft); Harrachov, 9 March 1996
Medal record
Men's ski jumping
Olympic Games
Gold medal – first place	1992 Albertville	Team LH
FIS Nordic World Ski Championships
Gold medal – first place	1995 Thunder Bay	Team LH
Gold medal – first place	1997 Trondheim	Team LH
Bronze medal – third place	1995 Thunder Bay	Individual NH
- Updated on 10 February 2016

Mika Antero Laitinen (born 5 April 1973) is a Finnish former ski jumper who competed from 1990 to 2000.

== Career ==
He won a gold medal in the Team large hill competition at the 1992 Winter Olympics in Albertville.

His biggest successes were at the FIS Nordic World Ski Championships, where he won three medals, including two golds in the Team large hill event (1995, 1997) and a bronze in the Individual normal hill (1995).

In the 1995/96 World Cup season, Laitinen dominated the first part of the season and won five of the nine events, until he fell and injured himself during a practice jump in Garmisch-Partenkirchen.

== World Cup ==
=== Standings ===
Season	Overall	4H	SF	NT	JP
1989/90	—	—	N/A	N/A	N/A
1990/91	—	—	—	N/A	N/A
1991/92	49	—	—	N/A	N/A
1992/93	—	—	—	N/A	N/A
1994/95	9	11	6	N/A	N/A
1995/96	6	49	15	N/A	6
1996/97	14	7	39	69	12
1997/98	26	21	30	15	25
1998/99	33	24	32	31	32
1999/00	25	17	—	24	22

=== Wins ===
No.	Season	Date	Location	Hill	Size
1	1995/96	2 December 1995	(Norway) Lillehammer	Lysgårdsbakken K90 (night)	NH
2	1995/96	10 December 1995	(Slovenia) Planica	Bloudkova velikanka K120	LH
3	1995/96	12 December 1995	(Italy) Predazzo	Trampolino dal Ben K90	NH
4	1995/96	28 December 1995	(Germany) Oberhof	Hans-Renner-Schanze K120	LH
5	1995/96	30 December 1995	(Germany) Oberstdorf	Schattenbergschanze K115	LH
