= Roberto Cecon =

Italian ski jumper

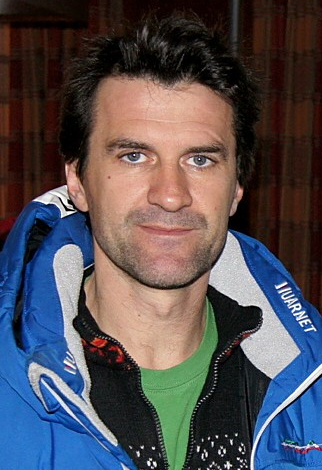

Personal information
- Nationality: Italy
- Born: 28 December 1971 (age 54) Gemona del Friuli, Italy
- Height: 1.78 m (5 ft 10 in)

Sport
- Sport: Skiing

World Cup career
- Seasons: 1988–2003
- Indiv. starts: 257
- Indiv. podiums: 17
- Indiv. wins: 6
- Team starts: 4

Achievements and titles
- Personal bests: 207.5 m (681 ft); Planica, 20 March 2003
Medal record
Men's ski flying
FIS Ski Flying World Championships
Bronze medal – third place	1992 Harrachov	Individual
Bronze medal – third place	1994 Planica	Individual
- Updated on 10 February 2016

Roberto Cecon (born 28 December 1971) is an Italian former ski jumper.

== Career ==
He won two bronze medals at the FIS Ski Flying World Championships earning them in 1992 and 1994.

Cecon also competed in four Winter Olympics, earning his best finish 16th in the individual large hill event at Lillehammer in 1994. His best finish at the FIS Nordic World Ski Championships was eighth in the individual large hill event at Thunder Bay, Ontario in 1995.

Cecon also earned six World Cup victories in his career between 1990 and 1995. He is now a ski jumping coach.

== World Cup ==
=== Standings ===
Season	Overall	4H	SF	NT	JP
1987/88	52	77	N/A	N/A	N/A
1988/89	13	15	N/A	N/A	N/A
1989/90	17	47	N/A	N/A	N/A
1990/91	41	37	—	N/A	N/A
1991/92	24	37	12	N/A	N/A
1992/93	39	24	—	N/A	N/A
1993/94	5	6	3rd place, bronze medalist(s)	N/A	N/A
1994/95	2nd place, silver medalist(s)	7	3rd place, bronze medalist(s)	N/A	N/A
1995/96	45	34	23	N/A	48
1996/97	43	57	38	44	41
1997/98	30	36	33	6	29
1998/99	30	32	—	17	28
1999/00	23	23	—	32	28
2000/01	27	56	23	19	N/A
2001/02	17	17	N/A	14	N/A
2002/03	31	31	N/A	31	N/A

=== Wins ===
No.	Season	Date	Location	Hill	Size
1	1989/90	16 February 1990	(Italy) Predazzo	Trampolino dal Ben K90	NH
2	1989/90	24 March 1990	(Socialist Federal Republic of Yugoslavia) Planica	Bloudkova velikanka K120	LH
3	1993/94	9 March 1994	(Sweden) Örnsköldsvik	Paradiskullen K90 (night)	NH
4	1994/95	14 January 1995	(Switzerland) Engelberg	Gross-Titlis-Schanze K120	LH
5	1994/95	15 January 1995	(Switzerland) Engelberg	Gross-Titlis-Schanze K120	LH
6	1994/95	4 February 1995	(Sweden) Falun	Lugnet K90 (night)	NH
