= Takanobu Okabe =

Japanese ski jumper (born 1970)

Takanobu Okabe 岡部 孝信
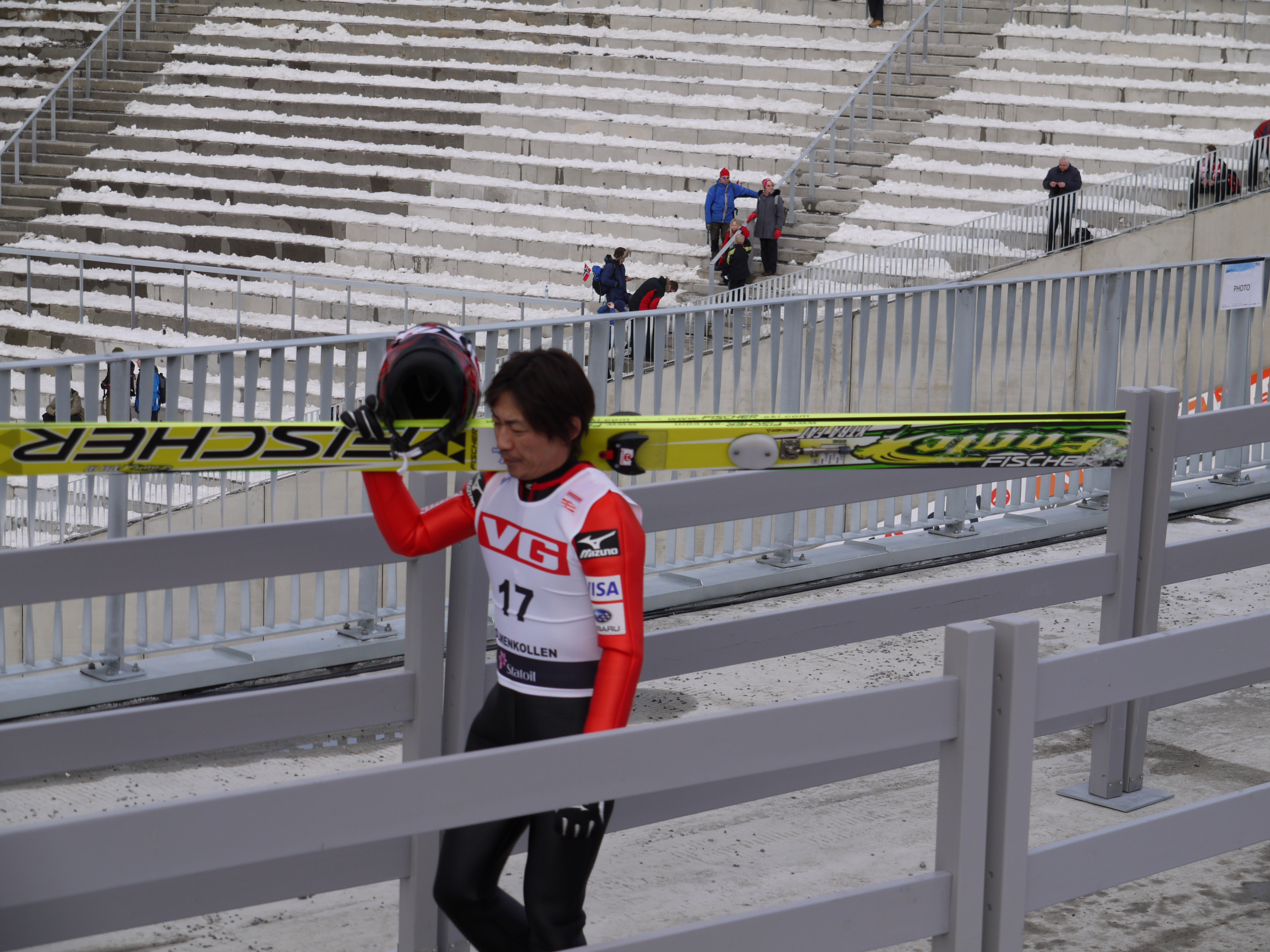

Personal information
- Full name: 岡部 孝信
- Nationality: Japan
- Born: 26 October 1970 (age 56) Shimokawa, Japan
- Height: 164 cm (5 ft 5 in)

Sport
- Sport: Skiing

World Cup career
- Seasons: 1990-1991; 1993-2003; 2005-2010; 2012-2014
- Indiv. starts: 215
- Indiv. podiums: 23
- Indiv. wins: 5
- Team starts: 15
- Team podiums: 6
- Team wins: 2

Achievements and titles
- Personal bests: 217.5 m (714 ft); Planica, 17 March 2006
Medal record
Men's ski jumping
Olympic Games
Gold medal – first place	1998 Nagano	Team LH
Silver medal – second place	1994 Lillehammer	Team LH
FIS Nordic World Ski Championships
Gold medal – first place	1995 Thunder Bay	Individual NH
Silver medal – second place	1997 Trondheim	Team LH
Bronze medal – third place	1995 Thunder Bay	Team LH
Bronze medal – third place	2007 Sapporo	Team LH
Bronze medal – third place	2009 Liberec	Team LH
- Updated on 10 February 2016

Takanobu Okabe (岡部 孝信, Okabe Takanobu) (born 26 October 1970) is a Japanese former ski jumper.

== Career ==
His debut World Cup performance was on 16 December 1989 in Sapporo. Competing in three Winter Olympics, he won two medals in the team large hill event at the Winter Olympics with a silver in 1994 and a gold in 1998.

Okabe had his biggest successes at the FIS Nordic World Ski Championships, winning five medals. This included a gold in the individual normal hill (1995), a silver in the team large hill (1997), and three bronzes in the team large hill (1995, 2007, 2009).

Okabe has five individual World Cup victories, three of which came on flying hills. At the time of his latest win in Kuopio on March 10, 2009 he was, at the age of 38 years and 135 days, the oldest ski jumper to ever win a World Cup competition. This record has since been beaten by his compatriot Noriaki Kasai.

On 12 March 2014, the International Ski Federation announced his retirement.

== World Cup ==
=== Standings ===
Season	Overall	4H	SF	NT	JP
1989/90	—	—	N/A	N/A	N/A
1990/91	—	—	—	N/A	N/A
1992/93	24	—	—	N/A	N/A
1993/94	7	13	11	N/A	N/A
1994/95	5	19	2nd place, silver medalist(s)	N/A	N/A
1995/96	39	—	—	N/A	35
1996/97	4	4	2nd place, silver medalist(s)	25	6
1997/98	16	33	6	21	18
1998/99	38	30	—	—	37
1999/00	33	—	31	37	33
2000/01	49	72	—	—	N/A
2001/02	59	—	N/A	—	N/A
2002/03	—	—	N/A	—	N/A
2004/05	49	—	N/A	40	N/A
2005/06	12	6	N/A	14	N/A
2006/07	52	49	N/A	22	N/A
2007/08	63	—	N/A	—	N/A
2008/09	28	—	—	24	N/A
2009/10	82	—	—	63	N/A
2011/12	—	—	—	N/A	N/A
2012/13	—	—	—	N/A	N/A
2013/14	—	—	—	N/A	N/A

=== Wins ===
No.	Season	Date	Location	Hill	Size
1	1996/97	7 December 1996	(Finland) Kuusamo	Rukatunturi K120 (night)	LH
2	1996/97	8 February 1997	(Austria) Tauplitz/Bad Mitterndorf	Kulm K185	FH
3	1996/97	22 March 1997	(Slovenia) Planica	Velikanka bratov Gorišek K185	FH
4	1997/98	1 March 1998	(Norway) Vikersund	Vikersundbakken K175	FH
5	2008/09	10 March 2009	(Finland) Kuopio	Puijo HS127 (night)	LH
