= Andreas Goldberger =

Austrian ski jumper

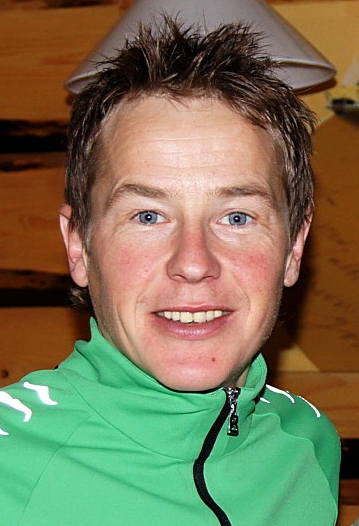
- Goldberger in 2011

Personal information
- Nationality: Austria
- Born: 29 November 1972 (age 53) Ried im Innkreis, Austria
- Height: 172 cm (5 ft 8 in)

Sport
- Sport: Skiing

World Cup career
- Seasons: 1991–2005
- Indiv. starts: 288
- Indiv. podiums: 63
- Indiv. wins: 20
- Team starts: 15
- Team podiums: 12
- Team wins: 4
- Overall titles: 3 (1993, 1995, 1996)
- Four Hills titles: 2 (1993, 1995)
- Ski Flying titles: 2 (1995, 1996)

Achievements and titles
- Personal bests: 225 m (738 ft); Planica, 18 March 2000
Medal record
Men's ski jumping
Event	1st	2nd	3rd
Olympic Games	0	0	2
World Championships	1	2	4
Ski Flying World Championships	1	1	1
Total	2	3	7
Olympic Games
Bronze medal – third place	1994 Lillehammer	Individual LH
Bronze medal – third place	1994 Lillehammer	Team LH
Ski Jumping World Championships
Gold medal – first place	2001 Lahti	Team NH
Silver medal – second place	1993 Falun	Individual NH
Silver medal – second place	1995 Thunder Bay	Individual LH
Bronze medal – third place	1993 Falun	Individual LH
Bronze medal – third place	1993 Falun	Team LH
Bronze medal – third place	1997 Trondheim	Individual NH
Bronze medal – third place	2001 Lahti	Team LH
Men's ski flying
Ski Flying World Championships
Gold medal – first place	1996 Kulm	Individual
Silver medal – second place	1992 Harrachov	Individual
Bronze medal – third place	2004 Planica	Team
- Updated on 10 February 2016

Andreas "Andi" Goldberger (born 29 November 1972) is an Austrian former ski jumper.

In 1994 he became the first man in history to jump over 200 metres, but did not manage to stand.

== Career ==
He won the World Cup overall titles three times (1993, 1995, 1996), the Four Hills Tournament twice (1992/93, 1994/95), with multiple medals in the Nordic World Championships and Winter Olympics.

Despite his success at ski jumping, Goldberger preferred ski flying—a more extreme version of normal ski jumping, in which distances are far greater.

=== History was made ===
On 17 March 1994, during training for the Ski Flying World Championships on Velikanka bratov Gorišek in Planica, Slovenia, he recorded a jump of 202 metres (663 ft); this made him the first man to ever to jump over two hundred metres, but he touched the snow with his hand upon landing, thus making the jump invalid as an official world record (Finland's Toni Nieminen would later land a 203 m jump at the same event).

=== World record ===
On 18 March 2000, he set the ski jumping world record distance at 225 metres (738 ft) on Velikanka bratov Gorišek in Planica, Slovenia It stood for the next three years.

== Controversy ==
In 1997 Goldberger admitted to the use of cocaine, and was given a six-month ban from the Austrian Ski Association. As a result of that ban, in November 1997, he even declared he would, from that moment on, compete under the flag of the Federal Republic of Yugoslavia. Yet, after reaching an agreement with the Austrian Ski Association, he continued competing for his native Austria.

== End of career ==
Goldberger last World Cup appearance as a ski jumper was in Lahti on 6 March 2005 (49 place).

In 2006 he officially ended his career with his final jump as a test jumper in Kulm, Austria.

After ending his ski jumping career he immediately became an expert co-commentator on the Austrian national TV station ORF, where he still works today.

== World Cup ==
=== Standings ===
Season	Overall	4H	SF	NT	JP
1990/91	37	47	14	N/A	N/A
1991/92	8	38	2nd place, silver medalist(s)	N/A	N/A
1992/93	1st place, gold medalist(s)	1st place, gold medalist(s)	3rd place, bronze medalist(s)	N/A	N/A
1993/94	3rd place, bronze medalist(s)	3rd place, bronze medalist(s)	13	N/A	N/A
1994/95	1st place, gold medalist(s)	1st place, gold medalist(s)	1st place, gold medalist(s)	N/A	N/A
1995/96	1st place, gold medalist(s)	7	1st place, gold medalist(s)	N/A	2nd place, silver medalist(s)
1996/97	8	2nd place, silver medalist(s)	5	69	7
1997/98	17	4	15	40	16
1998/99	17	9	34	9	16
1999/00	5	5	4	5	4
2000/01	14	26	7	2nd place, silver medalist(s)	N/A
2001/02	13	9	N/A	16	N/A
2002/03	12	9	N/A	—	N/A
2003/04	18	24	N/A	27	N/A
2004/05	36	28	N/A	69	N/A

=== Wins ===
No.	Season	Date	Location	Hill	Size
1	1992/93	4 January 1993	(Austria) Innsbruck	Bergiselschanze K109	LH
2	1992/93	6 January 1993	(Austria) Bischofshofen	Paul-Ausserleitner-Schanze K120	LH
3	1993/94	17 December 1993	(France) Courchevel	Tremplin du Praz K120	LH
4	1993/94	4 January 1994	(Austria) Innsbruck	Bergiselschanze K109	LH
5	1994/95	11 December 1994	(Slovenia) Planica	Srednja Bloudkova K90	NH
6	1994/95	6 January 1995	(Austria) Bischofshofen	Paul-Ausserleitner-Schanze K120	LH
7	1994/95	8 January 1995	(Germany) Willingen	Mühlenkopfschanze K120	LH
8	1994/95	21 January 1995	(Japan) Sapporo	Miyanomori K90	NH
9	1994/95	28 January 1995	(Finland) Lahti	Salpausselkä K90	NH
10	1994/95	8 February 1995	(Norway) Lillehammer	Lysgårdsbakken K120 (night)	LH
11	1994/95	12 February 1995	(Norway) Oslo	Holmenkollbakken K110	LH
12	1994/95	18 February 1995	(Norway) Vikersund	Vikersundbakken K175	FH
13	1994/95	19 February 1995	(Norway) Vikersund	Vikersundbakken K175	FH
14	1994/95	25 February 1995	(Germany) Oberstdorf	Heini-Klopfer-Skiflugschanze K182	FH
15	1995/96	4 January 1996	(Austria) Innsbruck	Bergiselschanze K109	LH
16	1995/96	14 January 1996	(Switzerland) Engelberg	Gross-Titlis-Schanze K120	LH
17	1995/96	21 January 1996	(Japan) Sapporo	Ōkurayama K115	LH
18	1995/96	28 January 1996	(Poland) Zakopane	Wielka Krokiew K116	LH
19	1995/96	11 February 1996	(Austria) Bad Mitterndorf	Kulm K185	FH
20	1995/96	9 March 1996	(Czech Republic) Harrachov	Čerťák K180	FH

== Ski jumping world records ==
Date	Hill	Location	Metres	Feet
17 March 1994	Velikanka bratov Gorišek K185	Planica, Slovenia	202	663
18 March 2000	Velikanka bratov Gorišek K185	Planica, Slovenia	225	738

Not recognized. Ground touch at world record distance, but first ever jump over 200 metres.

Records
Previous: Thomas Hörl	World's longest ski jump 225 m (738 ft); 18 March 2000 – 20 March 2003	Next: Adam Małysz
