= Nicolas Jean-Prost =

French former ski jumper (born 1967)

Nicolas Jean-Prost (born 1 May 1967 in Le Sentier, Switzerland) is a French former ski jumper who competed from 1989 to 1996. At the Winter Olympics, he finished sixth in the team large hill at Lillehammer in 1994 and 19th in the individual normal hill at Albertville in 1992.

Jean-Prost's best individual finish at the FIS Nordic World Ski Championships was sixth in the large hill event at Thunder Bay, Ontario in 1995. His best finish at the Ski-flying World Championships was 16th at Bad Mitterndorf in 1996.

Jean-Prost's best individual World Cup finish was fifth on three occasions at various hills from 1992 to 1995.
