= 1997–98 FIS Ski Jumping Continental Cup =

Ski-jumping competition series

FIS Continental Cup 1997/98
Winners
- Overall: (Germany) Alexander Herr

Competitions
- Venues: 28
- Individual: 50

The 1997/98 FIS Ski Jumping Continental Cup was the 7th in a row (5th official) Continental Cup winter season in ski jumping for men. Europa Cup was a predecessor of Continental Cup.

Other competitive circuits this season included the World Cup and Grand Prix.

== Men's Individual ==
Individual events in the CC history

Total	F	L	N	Winners
251	2	89	160	123

after large hill event in Kuusamo (5 April 1998)

=== Calendar ===
All	No.	Date	Place (Hill)	Size	Winner	Second	Third	R.
202	1	28 June 1997	(Slovenia) Velenje (Grajski grič K80) (Note: Not clear if Grajski grič hill in Velenje had K-point at K75 or K80 at that time.)	N _{133}	(Slovenia) Primož Peterka			
203	2	14 August 1997	(Norway) Rælingen (Marikollen K88)	N _{134}	(Norway) Stein Henrik Tuff	(Norway) Wilhelm Brenna	(Norway) Tommy Ingebrigtsen	
204	3	16 August 1997	(Poland) Zakopane (Średnia Krokiew K85)	N _{135}	(Austria) Roland Wakolm	(Poland) Wojciech Skupień	(Poland) Krystian Długopolski	
205	4	17 August 1997	(Poland) Zakopane (Średnia Krokiew K85)	N _{136}	(Poland) Wojciech Skupień	(Austria) Wolfgang Loitzl	(Poland) Robert Mateja	
206	5	6 September 1997	(Czech Republic) Frenštát pod Radhoštěm (Areal Horečky K90)	N _{137}	(Czech Republic) Jaroslav Sakala	(Czech Republic) Jakub Janda	(Poland) Adam Małysz	
207	6	7 September 1997	(Czech Republic) Frenštát pod Radhoštěm (Areal Horečky K90)	N _{138}	(Czech Republic) Jaroslav Sakala	(Poland) Adam Małysz	(Poland) Krystian Długopolski	
208	7	13 September 1997	(Germany) Oberhof (Hans-Renner-Schanze K120)	L _{068}	(Germany) Martin Schmitt	(Germany) Christof Duffner	(Czech Republic) Jakub Sucháček	
209	8	14 September 1997	(Germany) Oberhof (Hans-Renner-Schanze K120)	L _{069}	(Germany) Martin Schmitt	(Poland) Krystian Długopolski	(Germany) Christof Duffner	
210	9	20 September 1997	(Japan) Hakuba (Olympic Hills K120)	L _{070}	(Japan) Takanobu Okabe	(Japan) Masahiko Harada	(Austria) Wolfgang Loitzl	
211	10	21 September 1997	(Japan) Hakuba (Olympic Hills K120)	L _{071}	(Japan) Kazuyoshi Funaki	(Japan) Noriaki Kasai	(Japan) Takanobu Okabe	
212	11	13 December 1997	(France) Chamonix (Le Mont K95)	N _{139}	(France) Jérôme Gay	(Slovenia) Miha Rihtar	(Norway) Arne Sneli	
213	12	14 December 1997	(France) Chamonix (Le Mont K95)	N _{140}	(France) Jérôme Gay	(Switzerland) Sylvain Freiholz	(France) Lucas Chevalier-Girod	
214	13	19 December 1997	(Finland) Lahti (Salpausselkä K90)	N _{141}	(Finland) Toni Nieminen	(Finland) Pasi Huttunen (Austria) Falko Krismayr		
215	14	20 December 1997	(Finland) Lahti (Salpausselkä K90)	N _{142}	(Austria) Falko Krismayr	(Finland) Pasi Huttunen	(Norway) Stian Kvarstad	
216	15	20 December 1997	(Germany) Oberwiesenthal (Fichtelbergschanzen K90)	N _{143}	(Germany) Frank Reichel	(Germany) Gerd Siegmund	(Austria) Gerhard Gattinger	
217	16	21 December 1997	(Finland) Lahti (Salpausselkä K90)	N _{144}	(Norway) Tom Aage Aarnes (Norway) Frode Håre		(Norway) Stian Kvarstad	
218	17	21 December 1997	(Germany) Oberwiesenthal (Fichtelbergschanzen K90)	N _{145}	(Austria) Michael Kury	(Slovenia) Damjan Fras	(Germany) Gerd Siegmund	
219	18	26 December 1997	(Switzerland) St. Moritz (Olympiaschanze K95)	N _{146}	(Germany) Martin Schmitt	(Switzerland) Sylvain Freiholz	(France) Jérôme Gay	
220	19	15 January 1998	(Japan) Sapporo (Miyanomori K90/K120)	N _{147}	(Japan) Takanobu Okabe	(Austria) Michael Kury	(Japan) Jin'ya Nishikata	
221	20	17 January 1998	(Japan) Sapporo (Miyanomori K90/K120)	L _{072}	(Japan) Hideharu Miyahira	(Japan) Takanobu Okabe	(Japan) Akira Higashi	
222	21	17 January 1998	(Germany) Garmisch-Partenkirchen (Große Olympiaschanze K115)	L _{073}	(Austria) Falko Krismayr	(Norway) Stian Kvarstad	(Germany) Alexander Herr	
223	22	18 January 1998	(Japan) Sapporo (Ōkurayama K120)	L _{074}	(Japan) Ryūji Takahashi	(Japan) Takanobu Okabe	(Slovenia) Damjan Fras	
224	23	18 January 1998	(Germany) Garmisch-Partenkirchen (Große Olympiaschanze K115)	L _{075}	(Germany) Alexander Herr	(Czech Republic) Jakub Sucháček	(Norway) Stian Kvarstad	
225	24	24 January 1998	(Czechoslovakia) Liberec (Ještěd A K120)	L _{076}	(Poland) Robert Mateja	(Czech Republic) Jakub Jiroutek	(Czech Republic) František Jež	
226	25	25 January 1998	(Czechoslovakia) Liberec (Ještěd A K120)	L _{077}	(Austria) Michael Kury	(Poland) Wojciech Skupień	(Czech Republic) Jakub Jiroutek	
227	26	6 February 1998	(Austria) Villach (Villacher Alpenarena K90)	N _{148}	(France) Maxime Belleville	(Germany) Alexander Herr	(Slovenia) Grega Lang	
228	27	7 February 1998	(Slovenia) Planica (Bloudkova velikanka K120)	L _{078}	(Germany) Alexander Herr	(Austria) Ingemar Mayr	(Germany) Ralf Gebstedt	
229	28	7 February 1998	(United States) Westby (Snowflake K106)	L _{079}	(Czech Republic) Jakub Jiroutek	(Italy) Ivan Lunardi	(Norway) Simen Berntsen	
230	29	8 February 1998	(Slovenia) Planica (Bloudkova velikanka K120)	L _{080}	(Germany) Alexander Herr	(Slovenia) Grega Lang	(Austria) Matthias Wallner	
231	30	8 February 1998	(United States) Westby (Snowflake K106)	L _{081}	(Slovenia) Robert Kranjec	(Norway) Wilhelm Brenna	(Norway) Tom Aage Aarnes	
232	31	13 February 1998	(Germany) Reit im Winkl (Franz-Haslberger-Schanze K90)	N _{149}	(Germany) Ronny Hornschuh	(Austria) Martin Zimmermann	(Austria) Ingemar Mayr	
233	32	14 February 1998	(Austria) Saalfelden (Bibergschanze K85)	N _{150}	(Austria) Martin Zimmermann	(Austria) Matthias Wallner	(Czech Republic) Jaroslav Kahánek	
234	33	14 February 1998	(United States) Iron Mountain (Pine Mountain Ski Jump K120)	L _{082}	(Germany) Alexander Herr	(Czech Republic) Jakub Jiroutek	(Czech Republic) Roman Křenek	
235	34	15 February 1998	(Norway) Oslo (Holmenkollbakken K112)	L _{083}	(Norway) Morten Ågheim	(Norway) Erling Enger	(Norway) Sturle Holseter	
236	35	15 February 1998	(Germany) Ruhpolding (Toni-Plenk-Schanze K90)	N _{151}	(Austria) Ingemar Mayr	(Czech Republic) Jaroslav Kahánek	(Germany) Christof Duffner	
German Austrian Three Hills Tournament Overall (13 – 14, 15 February 1998)					(Austria) Martin Zimmermann	(Austria) Ingemar Mayr	(Germany) Ronny Hornschuh	
237	36	15 February 1998	(United States) Iron Mountain (Pine Mountain Ski Jump K120)	L _{084}	(Germany) Alexander Herr	(Czech Republic) Jakub Jiroutek	(Norway) Simen Berntsen	
238	37	21 February 1998	(Germany) Willingen (Mühlenkopfschanze K120)	L _{085}	(Slovenia) Grega Lang	(Germany) Dirk Else	(Austria) Martin Zimmermann	
239	38	21 February 1998	(United States) Ishpeming (Suicide Hill K90)	N _{152}	(Germany) Alexander Herr	(Norway) Kurt Børset	(France) Maxime Belleville	
240	39	22 February 1998	(Germany) Willingen (Mühlenkopfschanze K120)	L _{086}	(Czech Republic) Jakub Janda	(Norway) Kjell Erik Sagbakken	(Austria) Martin Zimmermann	
241	40	22 February 1998	(United States) Ishpeming (Suicide Hill K90)	N _{153}	(Germany) Alexander Herr	(Czech Republic) Roman Křenek	(Norway) Simen Berntsen	
242	41	7 March 1998	(Germany) Schönwald (Adlerschanzen Schönwald K85)	N _{154}	(Czech Republic) Roman Křenek	(Norway) Wilhelm Brenna	(Norway) Kjell Erik Sagbakken	
243	42	8 March 1998	(Japan) Sapporo (Ōkurayama K120)	L _{087}	(Japan) Kenji Suda	(Japan) Jin'ya Nishikata	(Japan) Kazuya Yoshioka	
244	43	8 March 1998	(Germany) Schönwald (Adlerschanzen Schönwald K85)	N _{155}	(Czech Republic) Roman Křenek	(Czech Republic) Jakub Hlava	(Slovenia) Damjan Fras	
26th Schwarzwald Tournament Overall (7 and 8 March 1998)					(Czech Republic) Roman Křenek	(Norway) Wilhelm Brenna	(Norway) Kjell Erik Sagbakken	
245	44	11 March 1998	(Japan) Zaō Onsen (Yamagata K85)	N _{156}	(Japan) Jin'ya Nishikata	(Japan) Kenji Suda	(Japan) Masayuki Satō	
246	45	12 March 1998	(Japan) Zaō Onsen (Yamagata K85)	N _{157}	(Japan) Masayuki Satō	(Japan) Jin'ya Nishikata	(Austria) Karl-Heinz Dorner	
247	46	13 March 1998	(France) Courchevel (Tremplin du Praz K90)	N _{158}	(Slovenia) Damjan Fras	(Austria) Gerhard Gattinger	(Norway) Morten Ågheim	
248	47	14 March 1998	(France) Courchevel (Tremplin du Praz K90)	N _{159}	(Germany) Michael Uhrmann	(Czech Republic) Jakub Janda	(Norway) Morten Ågheim	
249	48	29 March 1998	(Finland) Rovaniemi (Ounasvaara K90)	N _{160}	(Finland) Janne Ahonen	(Finland) Ville Kantee	(Finland) Kimmo Savolainen	
250	49	4 April 1998	(Finland) Kuusamo (Rukatunturi K120)	L _{088}				
251	50	5 April 1998	(Finland) Kuusamo (Rukatunturi K120)	L _{089}	(Norway) Morten Ågheim	(Finland) Pekka Salminen	(Finland) Toni Nieminen	
7th FIS Continental Cup Overall (28 June 1997 – 5 April 1998)					(Germany) Alexander Herr	(Austria) Falko Krismayr	(Slovenia) Damjan Fras	

== Standings ==
=== Overall ===
Rank	after 50 events	Points
1	(Germany) Alexander Herr	1173
2	(Austria) Falko Krismayr	707
3	(Slovenia) Damjan Fras	666
4	(Austria) Michael Kury	634
5	(Austria) Matthias Wallner	623
6	(Czech Republic) Jakub Janda	612
7	(Germany) Klaus Allgayer	545
8	(Norway) Stian Kvarstad	538
9	(Germany) Ralf Gebstedt	533
10	(Czech Republic) Jakub Jiroutek	516

== Europa Cup vs. Continental Cup ==
- Last two Europa Cup seasons (1991/92 and 1992/93) are recognized as first two Continental Cup seasons by International Ski Federation (FIS), although Continental Cup under this name officially started first season in 1993/94 season.

== See also ==
- 1997–98 FIS World Cup
- 1997 FIS Grand Prix
