= 1995–96 FIS Ski Jumping Continental Cup =

Ski-jumping competition series

FIS Continental Cup 1995/96
Winners
- Overall: (Norway) Stein Henrik Tuff

Competitions
- Venues: 27
- Individual: 40

The 1995/96 FIS Ski Jumping Continental Cup was the 5th in a row (3rd official) Continental Cup winter season in ski jumping for men. Europa Cup was a predecessor of Continental Cup.

Other competitive circuits this season included the World Cup and Grand Prix.

== Men's Individual ==
Individual events in the CC history

Total	F	L	N	Winners
155	2	52	101	91

after large hill event in Rukatunturi (7 April 1995)

=== Calendar ===
All	No.	Date	Place (Hill)	Size	Winner	Second	Third	R.
116	1	9 December 1995	(Germany) Lauscha (Marktiegelschanze K92)	N _{075}	(Germany) Ronny Hornschuh	(Japan) Masayuki Satō	(Finland) Jussi Hautamäki (Norway) Kent Johanssen	
117	2	10 December 1995	(Germany) Brotterode (Inselbergschanze K98)	N _{076}	(Norway) Kent Johanssen	(Germany) Ronny Hornschuh	(Norway) Øyvind Berg	
118	3	16 December 1995	(Finland) Lahti (Salpausselkä K90)	N _{077}	(Norway) Kent Johanssen	(Finland) Jussi Hautamäki (Finland) Janne Väätäinen		
119	4	17 December 1995	(Finland) Lahti (Salpausselkä K90)	N _{078}	(Norway) Kent Johanssen	(Finland) Tero Koponen	(Norway) Kjetil Moen	
120	5	19 December 1995	(Finland) Kuopio (Puijo K90)	N _{079}	(Germany) Ronny Hornschuh	(Finland) Kimmo Savolainen	(Finland) Ari-Pekka Nikkola	
121	6	26 December 1995	(Switzerland) St. Moritz (Olympiaschanze K95)	N _{080}	(Germany) Hansjörg Jäkle	(Norway) Frode Håre (Austria) Michael Kury		
122	7	30 December 1995	(United States) Lake Placid (MacKenzie Intervale K120/90)	L _{040}	(Norway) Øyvind Berg	(France) Lucas Chevalier-Girod	(France) Yannick Revuz	
123	8	31 December 1995	(United States) Lake Placid (MacKenzie Intervale K120/90)	N _{081}	(Norway) Øyvind Berg	(France) Lucas Chevalier-Girod	(Finland) Jani Mattila	
124	9	7 January 1996	(Austria) Bad Goisern (Kalmberg-Schanze K90)	N _{082}	(Poland) Adam Małysz	(Austria) R. Schwarzenberger	(Switzerland) Stephan Zünd	
125	10	12 January 1996	(Germany) Reit im Winkl (Franz-Haslberger-Schanze K90)	N _{083}	(Finland) Toni Nieminen	(Germany) Ronny Hornschuh	(Finland) Tero Koponen	
126	11	13 January 1996	(Austria) Saalfelden (Bibergschanze K85)	N _{084}	(Norway) Simen Berntsen	(Norway) Stein Henrik Tuff	(Slovenia) Jure Radelj	
127	12	13 January 1996	(Japan) Sapporo (Ōkurayama K115)	L _{041}	(Japan) Noriaki Kasai	(Japan) Naoki Yasuzaki	(Japan) Kazuyoshi Funaki	
128	13	14 January 1996	(Germany) Berchtesgaden (Kälbersteinschanze K90)	N _{085}	(Finland) Toni Nieminen	(Norway) Simen Berntsen	(Austria) Karl-Heinz Dorner	
German Austrian Three Hills Tournament Overall (12 – 14 February 1996)					(Norway) Simen Berntsen	(Finland) Toni Nieminen	(Norway) Stein Henrik Tuff	
129	14	14 January 1996	(Japan) Sapporo (Ōkurayama K115) (Miyanomori K90)	L _{042}	(Norway) Frode Håre	(Japan) Noriaki Kasai	(Japan) Naoki Yasuzaki	
130	15	15 January 1996	(Japan) Sapporo (Ōkurayama K115) (Miyanomori K90)	N _{086}	(Japan) Yoshikazu Norota	(Japan) Katsutoshi Chiba	(Japan) Noriaki Kasai	
131	16	21 January 1996	(Germany) Willingen (Mühlenkopfschanze K120)	L _{043}	(Germany) Ronny Hornschuh	(France) Nicolas Dessum	(Kazakhstan) Dmitriy Chvykov	
132	17	27 January 1996	(Czechoslovakia) Liberec (Ještěd A K120/90)	L _{044}	(Slovenia) Samo Gostiša	(Norway) Frode Håre	(Slovenia) Jure Radelj	
133	18	28 January 1996	(Czechoslovakia) Liberec (Ještěd A K120/90)	N _{087}	(Norway) Stein Henrik Tuff	(Slovenia) Samo Gostiša	(Slovenia) Damjan Fras	
31st Bohemia Tournament Overall (27 – 28 January 1996)					(Slovenia) Samo Gostiša	(Norway) Stein Henrik Tuff	(Slovenia) Jure Radelj	
134	19	10 February 1996	(Austria) Seefeld in Tirol (Toni-Seelos-Olympiaschanze K90)	N _{088}	(Austria) Andreas Goldberger	(Slovenia) Samo Gostiša	(Austria) R. Schwarzenberger	
135	20	10 February 1996	(United States) Westby (Snowflake K106) (Note: Not clear if Snowflake hill in Westby had K-point at K106 or K113 at that time.)	L _{045}	(Finland) Tero Koponen	(Austria) Matthias Wallner	(Slovenia) Primož Peterka	
136	21	11 February 1996	(United States) Westby (Snowflake K106)	L _{046}	(Slovenia) Primož Peterka	(Finland) Janne Väätäinen	(Finland) Tero Koponen	
FIS World Cup 1995/96 = FIS Ski Flying World Championships 1996 (10 – 11 February • (Austria) Bad Mitterndorf)
137	22	17 February 1996	(Italy) Gallio (Trampolino di Pakstall K95)	N _{089}	(Norway) Stein Henrik Tuff	(Slovenia) Samo Gostiša	(Germany) Rico Meinel	
138	23	18 February 1996	(Italy) Gallio (Trampolino di Pakstall K95)	N _{090}	(Switzerland) Andreas Küttel	(Germany) Rico Meinel	(Slovenia) Jaka Grosar (Germany) Sven Hannawald	
139	24	2 March 1996	(Germany) Schönwald (Adlerschanzen Schönwald K85)	N _{091}	(Austria) Michael Kury	(Slovakia) Vladimír Roško	(Germany) Dirk Else	
140	25	2 March 1996	(Sweden) Örnsköldsvik (Paradiskullen K90)	N _{092}	(Norway) Wilhelm Brenna (Norway) Håvard Lie		(Russia) Roman Kerov	
141	26	3 March 1996	(Sweden) Örnsköldsvik (Paradiskullen K90)	N _{093}	(Sweden) Johan Rasmussen	(Norway) Wilhelm Brenna (Norway) Christian Meyer		
142	27	(Note: Not clear if competition in Titisee-Neustadt was held on 3 or 4 March.)4 March 1996	(Germany) Titisee-Neustadt (Hochfirstschanze K112)	L _{047}	(Austria) Michael Kury	(Germany) Hansjörg Jäkle	(France) Didier Mollard	
25th Schwarzwald Tournament Overall (2 and 4 March 1996)					(Austria) Michael Kury	(Germany) Hansjörg Jäkle	(France) Didier Mollard	
143	28	8 March 1996	(Sweden) Bollnäs (Bolleberget K90) (Note: Not clear if Bolleberget hill in Bollnäs had K-point at K89 or K90 at that time.)	N _{094}	(Finland) Toni Nieminen	(Poland) Adam Małysz	(Norway) Arve Vorvik	
144	29	9 March 1996	(Japan) Sapporo (Ōkurayama K115)	L _{048}	(Japan) Masahiko Harada	(Japan) Kenji Suda	(Japan) Kazuhiro Higashi	
145	30	9 March 1996	(France) Beuil (Tr. Olympique aux Launes K86)	N _{095}	(France) Didier Mollard	(Austria) Michael Kury	(France) Nicolas Jean-Prost	
146	31	10 March 1996	(France) Beuil (Tr. Olympique aux Launes K86)	N _{096}	(France) Didier Mollard	(Germany) Hansjörg Jäkle	(Austria) Michael Kury	
147	32	10 March 1996	(Sweden) Falun (Lugnet K115)	L _{049}	(Poland) Adam Małysz	(Norway) Arve Vorvik	(Japan) Kenji Ogiwara	
148	33	13 March 1996	(Japan) Zaō (Yamagata K85)	N _{097}	(Germany) Frank Reichel	(Japan) Naoto Itō	(Austria) Gerhard Schallert	
149	34	14 March 1996	(Japan) Zaō (Yamagata K85)	N _{098}	(Japan) Hideharu Miyahira	(Germany) Frank Reichel	(Germany) Kai Bracht	
150	35	16 March 1996	(Slovenia) Planica (Bloudkova velikanka K120)	L _{050}	(Germany) Sven Hannawald	(Germany) Hansjörg Jäkle	(Norway) Frode Håre	
151	36	17 March 1996	(Slovenia) Planica (Bloudkova velikanka K120)	L _{051}	(Austria) Michael Kury	(Germany) Hansjörg Jäkle	(Germany) Alexander Herr	
152	37	23 March 1996	(Norway) Voss (Bavallsbakken K95)	N _{099}	(Norway) Stein Henrik Tuff	(Norway) Simen Berntsen (Norway) Lars Egil Gran (Norway) Pål Hansen		
		(Note: According to one source, competition in Braunlage (23 March) was held as part of the Continental Cup, but not included in the final standings.)23 March 1996	(Germany) Braunlage; Wurmbergschanze K?)	N _{unk}	(Austria) Michael Kury	(Kazakhstan) Dionis Vodnyev	(Germany) Hansjörg Jäkle	
		(Note: According to one source, competition in Braunlage (24 March) was held as part of the Continental Cup, but not included in the final standings.)24 March 1996	(Germany) Braunlage; Wurmbergschanze K?)	N _{unk}	(Austria) Michael Kury	(Austria) Ingemar Mayr	(Kazakhstan) Dionis Vodnyev	
153	38	24 March 1996	(Norway) Voss (Bavallsbakken K95)	N _{100}	(Norway) Frode Håre	(Norway) Øyvind Berg (Norway) Kent Johanssen		
154	39	30 March 1996	(Finland) Rovaniemi (Ounasvaara K90)	N _{101}	(Finland) Mika Laitinen	(Norway) Frode Håre	(Finland) Ari-Pekka Nikkola	
155	40	7 April 1996	(Finland) Kuusamo (Rukatunturi K120)	L _{052}	(Finland) Juho Forsman	(Finland) Kimmo Savolainen	(Norway) Frode Håre	
5th FIS Continental Cup Overall (9 December 1995 – 7 April 1996)					(Norway) Stein Henrik Tuff	(Norway) Frode Håre	(Austria) Michael Kury	

== Standings ==
=== Overall ===
Rank	after 40 events	Points
1	(Norway) Stein Henrik Tuff	878
2	(Norway) Frode Håre	815
3	(Austria) Michael Kury	758
4	(Germany) Hansjörg Jäkle	650
5	(Germany) Ronny Hornschuh	640
6	(Norway) Simen Berntsen	612
7	(Slovenia) Jure Radelj	603
8	(Norway) Øyvind Berg	595
9	(Finland) Tero Koponen	524
10	(Finland) Toni Nieminen	510

== Europa Cup vs. Continental Cup ==
- Last two Europa Cup seasons (1991/92 and 1992/93) are recognized as first two Continental Cup seasons by International Ski Federation (FIS), although Continental Cup under this name officially started first season in 1993/94 season.

== See also ==
- 1995–96 FIS World Cup
- 1995 FIS Grand Prix
