= 1996–97 FIS Ski Jumping Continental Cup =

Ski-jumping competition series

FIS Continental Cup 1996/97
Winners
- Overall: (Norway) Hein-Arne Mathiesen (version I) (Czech Republic) Jaroslav Kahánek (version II)

Competitions
- Venues: 29
- Individual: 46

The 1996/97 FIS Ski Jumping Continental Cup was the 6th in a row (4th official) Continental Cup winter season in ski jumping for men. Europa Cup was a predecessor of Continental Cup.

For the first time in history competitions were held in summer on plastic. However, both summer season on plastic and winter season on snow together counted in joined overall ranking.

It is not clear won actually won the season or what was the final score ranking, as it is not clear if Polish wiki took in consideration correct 46 events in the season, or the counted in both events in Velenje (28 and 29 June) at the start of the season, which didn't count for Continental Cup.

Other competitive circuits this season included the World Cup and Grand Prix.

== Men's Individual ==
Individual events in the CC history

Total	F	L	N	Winners
201	2	67	132	104

after normal hill event in Rovaniemi (4 or 6 April 1997)

=== Calendar ===
All	No.	Date	Place (Hill)	Size	Winner	Second	Third
156	1	14 August 1996	(France) Courchevel (Tremplin du Praz K120)	L _{053}	(France) Nicolas Dessum	(Japan) Hideharu Miyahira	(France) Lucas Chevalier-Girod
157	2	18 August 1996	(Poland) Zakopane (Średnia Krokiew K85)	N _{102}	(Japan) Naoto Itō	(Poland) Marcin Sitarz	(Czech Republic) Jaroslav Kahánek
158	3	8 September 1996	(Czech Republic) Frenštát pod Radhoštěm (Areal Horečky K90)	N _{103}	(Czech Republic) František Jež	(Czech Republic) Jaroslav Kahánek	(Czech Republic) Jaroslav Sakala
159	4	21 September 1996	(Japan) Hakuba (Olympic Hills K90/120)	N _{104}	(Japan) Masahiko Harada	(Japan) Masayuki Satō	(Japan) Kazuyoshi Funaki
160	5	22 September 1996	(Japan) Hakuba (Olympic Hills K90/120)	L _{054}	(Japan) Masahiko Harada	(Poland) Adam Małysz	(Japan) Masayuki Satō
161	6	(Note: One source claims that event on Chonju hill in Muju (26 September) was actually held on normal hill.)26 September 1996	(South Korea) Muju (Chonju K120/90)	L _{055}	(Poland) Adam Małysz	(Switzerland) Marco Steinauer	(Japan) Hideharu Miyahira
162	7	(Note: One source claims that event on Chonju hill in Muju (27 September) was actually held on large hill.)27 September 1996	(South Korea) Muju (Chonju K120/90)	N _{105}	(Poland) Adam Małysz	(Austria) Ingemar Mayr	(Japan) Hideharu Miyahira
163	8	14 December 1996	(France) Chaux-Neuve (La Côté Feuillée K90)	N _{106}	(Austria) Andreas Widhölzl	(Norway) Hein-Arne Mathiesen	(Austria) Ingemar Mayr
164	9	15 December 1996	(France) Chaux-Neuve (La Côté Feuillée K90)	N _{107}	(Austria) Andreas Widhölzl	(Japan) Yukitaka Fukita	(Norway) Hein-Arne Mathiesen
165	10	21 December 1996	(Germany) Brotterode (Inselbergschanze K98)	N _{108}	(Austria) Andreas Widhölzl	(Austria) Ingemar Mayr	(Germany) Sven Hannawald
166	11	22 December 1996	(Germany) Lauscha (Marktiegelschanze K92)	N _{109}	(Finland) Toni Nieminen	(Norway) Hein-Arne Mathiesen	(Germany) Sven Hannawald
167	12	26 December 1996	(Switzerland) St. Moritz (Olympiaschanze K95)	N _{110}	(Austria) Martin Höllwarth	(Japan) Yukitaka Fukita	(Germany) Martin Schmitt
168	13	28 December 1996	(United States) Lake Placid (MacKenzie Intervale K120/90)	L _{056}	(France) Jérôme Gay	(United States) Randy Weber	(Norway) Frode Håre
169	14	29 December 1996	(United States) Lake Placid (MacKenzie Intervale K120/90)	N _{111}	(Norway) Frode Håre	(France) Jérôme Gay	(United States) Randy Weber
170	15	10 January 1997	(Austria) Ramsau (W90-Mattensprunganlage K90)	N _{112}	(Germany) Frank Reichel (Norway) Hein-Arne Mathiesen		(Czech Republic) Roman Křenek (Czech Republic) Jaroslav Kahánek
171	16	11 January 1997	(Japan) Sapporo (Ōkurayama K120)	L _{057}	(Japan) Masahiko Harada	(Japan) Kazuhiro Higashi	(Japan) Kazuya Yoshioka
172	17	11 January 1997	(Austria) Villach (Villacher Alpenarena K90)	N _{113}	(Norway) Hein-Arne Mathiesen	(Germany) Martin Schmitt	(Czech Republic) Jaroslav Kahánek
173	18	12 January 1997	(Japan) Sapporo (Ōkurayama K120)	L _{058}	(Japan) Yūsuke Kaneko	(Japan) Masahiko Harada	(Japan) Naoki Yasuzaki
174	19	12 January 1997	(Slovenia) Planica (Srednja Bloudkova K90)	N _{114}	(Czech Republic) Roman Křenek	(Austria) Markus Eigentler	(Germany) Olaf Hegenbarth
175	20	15 January 1997	(Japan) Sapporo (Miyanomori K90)	N _{115}	(Norway) Egil Grønn	(Japan) Kazuhiro Higashi	(Japan) Naoki Yasuzaki
176	21	18 January 1997	(Germany) Oberhof (Hans-Renner-Schanze K120)	L _{059}	(Czech Republic) Roman Křenek	(Germany) Dionis Vodnev	(Norway) Simen Berntsen
177	22	19 January 1997	(Germany) Oberhof (Hans-Renner-Schanze K120)	L _{060}	(Czech Republic) Roman Křenek	(Germany) Martin Schmitt	(Germany) Dionis Vodnev
178	23	24 January 1997	(Slovakia) Štrbské Pleso (MS 1970 B K90)	N _{116}	(Austria) Andreas Widhölzl	(Norway) Simen Berntsen (Czech Republic) Roman Křenek	
		25 January 1997	(Poland) Wisła (Malinka K105)	L _{cnx}	cancelled due to technical reasons (missing computers in judge tower)		
179	24	26 January 1997	(Poland) Zakopane (Wielka Krokiew K116)	L _{061}	(Czech Republic) Roman Křenek	(Slovenia) Primož Peterka	(Germany) Christof Duffner
180	25	7 February 1997	(Germany) Reit im Winkl (Franz-Haslberger-Schanze K90)	N _{117}	(Austria) Martin Zimmermann	(Czech Republic) Jakub Janda	(Norway) Simen Berntsen
181	26	8 February 1997	(Austria) Saalfelden (Bibergschanze K85)	N _{118}	(Austria) Martin Höllwarth	(Germany) Ronny Hornschuh	(Czech Republic) Jaroslav Kahánek
182	27	8 February 1997	(United States) Westby (Snowflake K106) (Note: Not clear if Snowflake hill in Westby had K-point at K106 or K113 at that time.)	L _{062}	(Finland) Lassi Huuskonen	(Norway) Wilhelm Brenna	(Finland) Matti Hautamäki
183	28	9 February 1997	(Germany) Ruhpolding (Große Zirmbergschanze K108)	L _{063}	(Germany) Michael Uhrmann	(Germany) Dionis Vodnev	(Czech Republic) Jaroslav Kahánek
184	29	9 February 1997	(United States) Westby (Snowflake K106)	L _{064}	(Norway) Wilhelm Brenna	(Finland) Jussi Hautamäki	(Finland) Matti Hautamäki
FIS Nordic World Ski Championships 1997 (22 February – 1 March • (Norway) Trondheim)
185	30	22 February 1997	(United States) Iron Mountain (Pine Mountain Ski Jump K120)	L _{065}	(Norway) Simen Berntsen	(Norway) Wilhelm Brenna	(Norway) Hein-Arne Mathiesen
186	31	(Note: Event on Pine Mountain Ski Jump hill in Iron Mountain (23 February) had only one round.)23 February 1997	(United States) Iron Mountain (Pine Mountain Ski Jump K120)	L _{066}	(Germany) Sven Hannawald	(Czech Republic) František Jež	(Norway) Simen Berntsen
187	32	1 March 1997	(United States) Ishpeming (Suicide Hill K90)	N _{119}	(Norway) Simen Berntsen	(Norway) Wilhelm Brenna	(Czech Republic) Jakub Janda
188	33	2 March 1997	(United States) Ishpeming (Suicide Hill K90)	N _{120}	(Czech Republic) Tomáš Goder	(Norway) Simen Berntsen	(Norway) Wilhelm Brenna
189	34	8 March 1997	(Japan) Sapporo (Miyanomori K90)	N _{121}	(Austria) Falko Krismayr	(Japan) Kazuhiro Higashi	(Japan) Yūsuke Kaneko
190	35	8 March 1997	(Germany) Braunlage (Wurmbergschanze K80)	N _{122}	(Czech Republic) Jaroslav Kahánek	(Germany) Dionis Vodnev (Austria) Martin Zimmermann	
191	36	9 March 1997	(Germany) Braunlage (Wurmbergschanze K80)	N _{123}	(Czech Republic) Jaroslav Kahánek	(Norway) Hein-Arne Mathiesen	(Germany) Dionis Vodnev
192	37	12 March 1997	(Japan) Zaō (Yamagata K85)	N _{124}	(Japan) Katsutoshi Chiba	(Norway) Helge Brendryen	(South Korea) Choi Heung-chul
193	38	13 March 1997	(Japan) Zaō (Yamagata K85)	N _{125}	(Japan) Naoki Yasuzaki	(Austria) Falko Krismayr	(Japan) Yūsuke Kaneko
194	39	14 March 1997	(France) Courchevel (Tremplin du Praz K90)	N _{126}	(Austria) Ingemar Mayr	(Czech Republic) Jaroslav Kahánek	(Czech Republic) Pavel Věchet
195	40	14 March 1997	(Norway) Vikersund (Vikersundbakken K90)	N _{127}	(Norway) Christian Meyer	(Austria) Christian Moser	(Norway) Hein-Arne Mathiesen
196	41	(Note: One source claims that event on Tremplin du Praz hill in Courchevel (15 March) was actually held on large hill.)15 March 1997	(France) Courchevel (Tremplin du Praz K90)	N _{128}	(Czech Republic) Jaroslav Kahánek	(Austria) Ingemar Mayr	(Germany) Rico Meinel
197	42	15 March 1997	(Norway) Vikersund (Vikersundbakken K90)	N _{129}	(Norway) Arve Vorvik	(Norway) Marius Småriset	(Norway) Christian Meyer
198	43	22 March 1997	(Czech Republic) Harrachov (Čerťák K90)	N _{130}	(Germany) Ronny Hornschuh	(Norway) Wilhelm Brenna	(Norway) Arve Vorvik
199	44	(Note: One source claims that event on Čerťák hill in Harrachov (23 March) was actually held on large hill.)23 March 1997	(Czech Republic) Harrachov (Čerťák K90)	N _{131}	(Norway) Wilhelm Brenna	(Czech Republic) Jaroslav Kahánek	(Czech Republic) František Jež
200	45	30 March 1997	(Finland) Kuusamo (Rukatunturi K120)	L _{067}	(Finland) Jussi Hautamäki	(Finland) Jouni Kaitainen	(France) Jérôme Gay
201	46	(Note: Not clear if final season event on Ounasvaara hill in Rovaniemi was held on 4 or 6 April.)4 April 1997	(Finland) Rovaniemi (Ounasvaara K90)	N _{132}	(Finland) Jani Soininen	(France) Jérôme Gay	(Finland) Marko Isokangas
6th FIS Continental Cup Overall (14 August 1996 – 4 April 1997)					(Norway) Hein-Arne Mathiesen	(Norway) Simen Berntsen	(Czech Republic) Roman Křenek
6th FIS Continental Cup Overall (14 August 1996 – 4 April 1997)					(Czech Republic) Jaroslav Kahánek	(Austria) Ingemar Mayr	(Norway) Hein-Arne Mathiesen

== Standings ==
Unclear which ranking is right, as is it not clear if correct 46 or incorrect 48 events are took into points consideration.

=== Overall 1 ===
Rank	after 46 or 48 events	Points
1	(Norway) Hein-Arne Mathiesen	N/A
2	(Norway) Simen Berntsen	N/A
3	(Czech Republic) Roman Křenek	N/A

=== Overall 2 ===
Rank	after 46 or 48 events	Points
2	(Czech Republic) Jaroslav Kahánek	1130
3	(Austria) Ingemar Mayr	939
1	(Norway) Hein-Arne Mathiesen	841
4	(Norway) Simen Berntsen	728
5	(Norway) Wilhelm Brenna	687
6	(Czech Republic) Roman Křenek	683
7	(Germany) Sven Hannawald	615
8	(Austria) Andreas Widhölzl	500
9	(Czech Republic) František Jež	497
10	(Austria) Martin Zimmermann	482

== Europa Cup vs. Continental Cup ==
- Last two Europa Cup seasons (1991/92 and 1992/93) are recognized as first two Continental Cup seasons by International Ski Federation (FIS), although Continental Cup under this name officially started first season in 1993/94 season.

== See also ==
- 1996–97 FIS World Cup
- 1996 FIS Grand Prix
