= 1997–98 FIS Ski Flying World Cup =

Ski Flying World Cup 1997/98
Winners
- Overall: (Germany) Sven Hannawald
- Nations Cup unofficial: Japan

Competitions
- Venues: 2
- Individual: 4
- Cancelled: 1

The 1997/98 FIS Ski Flying World Cup was the 8th official World Cup season in ski flying awarded with small crystal globe as the subdiscipline of FIS Ski Jumping World Cup.

== Map of World Cup hosts ==
(Germany) Oberstdorf	(Norway) Vikersund
Heini-Klopfer-Skiflugschanze	Vikersundbakken
Europe

== Calendar ==
=== Men's Individual ===
All	No.	Date	Place (Hill)	Size	Winner	Second	Third	Ski flying leader	R.
FIS World Cup 1997/98 = FIS Ski Flying World Championships 1998 (24 – 25 January • Oberstdorf)
421	1	24 January 1998	(Germany) Oberstdorf (Heini-Klopfer K185)	F _{038}	(Germany) Sven Hannawald	(Japan) Kazuyoshi Funaki	(Norway) Kristian Brenden	(Germany) Sven Hannawald	
422	2	25 January 1998	(Germany) Oberstdorf (Heini-Klopfer K185)	F _{039}	(Japan) Kazuyoshi Funaki	(Germany) Dieter Thoma	(Germany) Sven Hannawald	(Japan) Kazuyoshi Funaki	
		28 February 1998	(Norway) Vikersund (Vikersundbakken K175)	F _{cnx}	cancelled due to strong wind; postponed on next day			—	
424	3	1 March 1998	(Norway) Vikersund (Vikersundbakken K175)	F _{040}	(Austria) Andreas Widhölzl	(Germany) Sven Hannawald	(Japan) Akira Higashi	(Germany) Sven Hannawald	
425	4	1 March 1998	(Norway) Vikersund (Vikersundbakken K175)	F _{041}	(Japan) Takanobu Okabe	(Japan) Hiroya Saito	(Japan) Noriaki Kasai	(Germany) Sven Hannawald	
8th FIS Ski Flying Men's Overall (24 January – 1 March 1998)					(Germany) Sven Hannawald	(Japan) Kazuyoshi Funaki	(Slovenia) Primož Peterka	Ski Flying Overall	

FIS Ski Jumping World Cup / FIS Ski Flying World Cup / FIS Ski Flying World Championships

== Standings ==
=== Ski Flying ===
Rank	after 4 events	24/02/1998 Oberstdorf	25/02/1998 Oberstdorf	01/03/1998 Vikersund	01/03/1998 Vikersund	Total
	(Germany) Sven Hannawald	100	60	80	18	258
2	(Japan) Kazuyoshi Funaki	80	100	15	22	217
3	(Slovenia) Primož Peterka	36	40	45	50	171
3	(Austria) Andreas Widhölzl	29	22	100	20	171
5	(Norway) Lasse Ottesen	45	50	22	40	157
6	(Germany) Dieter Thoma	40	80	29	1	150
	(Japan) Takanobu Okabe	—	—	50	100	150
8	(Norway) Kristian Brenden	60	18	16	29	123
	(Japan) Akira Higashi	12	15	60	36	123
10	(Japan) Hiroya Saito	—	—	32	80	112
11	(Norway) Henning Stensrud	50	45	—	—	95
	(Finland) Janne Ahonen	32	26	13	24	95
13	(Japan) Noriaki Kasai	—	—	18	60	78
14	(Germany) Hansjörg Jäkle	16	32	10	16	74
15	(Austria) Andreas Goldberger	5	36	26	2	69
16	(Switzerland) Bruno Reuteler	14	13	20	13	60
17	(Germany) Christof Duffner	26	20	11	—	57
18	(Czech Republic) Jakub Jiroutek	—	—	6	45	51
19	(Norway) Stian Kvarstad	—	—	36	14	50
20	(Finland) Jani Soininen	15	—	29	3	47
21	(Japan) Masahiko Harada	—	—	40	4	44
22	(Japan) Hideharu Miyahira	13	7	12	11	43
23	(Norway) Roar Ljøkelsøy	—	—	14	26	40
24	(Austria) Martin Höllwarth	—	—	24	12	36
25	(Finland) Kimmo Savolainen	18	16	—	—	34
26	(Norway) Espen Bredesen	—	24	—	8	32
	(Poland) Robert Mateja	—	—	—	32	32
28	(Austria) Stefan Horngacher	20	4	1	6	31
29	(Czech Republic) Jakub Sucháček	24	5	—	—	29
30	(Finland) Mika Laitinen	7	14	5	—	26
31	(Norway) Jon Petter Sandaker	22	—	—	—	22
32	(Japan) Kazuya Yoshioka	12	9	—	—	21
33	(Austria) Reinhard Schwarzenberger	8	12	—	—	20
	(Italy) Roberto Cecon	9	11	—	—	20
35	(Norway) Frode Håre	—	—	3	15	18
36	(Slovenia) Urban Franc	10	3	—	—	13
37	(Germany) Martin Schmitt	—	—	2	9	11
38	(Czech Republic) Jakub Janda	—	10	—	—	10
	(Norway) Kjell Erik Sagbakken	—	—	—	10	10
40	(Slovakia) Vladimír Roško	1	8	—	—	9
	(Japan) Kazuhiro Nakamura	—	—	9	—	9
42	(Austria) Falko Krismayr	—	—	8	—	8
43	(Slovakia) Martin Mesík	6	1	—	—	7
	(Norway) Tommy Ingebrigtsen	—	—	7	—	7
	(France) Nicolas Dessum	—	—	—	7	7
46	(Czech Republic) Jaroslav Sakala	—	6	—	—	6
47	(Austria) Martin Zimmermann	—	—	—	5	5
48	(Slovenia) Jure Radelj	4	—	—	—	4
	(Switzerland) Sylvain Freiholz	2	2	—	—	4
	(Germany) Gerd Siegmund	—	—	4	—	4

=== Nations Cup (unofficial) ===
Rank	after 4 events	Points
1	Japan	797
2	Germany	554
	Norway	554
4	Austria	340
5	Finland	202
6	Slovenia	191
7	Czech Republic	96
8	Switzerland	64
9	Poland	32
10	Italy	20
11	Slovakia	16
12	France	7
