= Aleksander Bojda =

Polish ski jumper and Nordic combined skier

Personal information
- Born: 1978 (age 47–48)

Sport
- Sport: Skiing
- Club: KS Wisła

Achievements and titles
- Personal best: 160 m in Harrachov (1996)

Aleksander Bojda (born 1978) is a Polish former ski jumper and Nordic combined skier, known for holding the unofficial record at the Wielka Krokiew ski jump in Zakopane. A member of KS Wisła, he won four team medals at the Polish Ski Jumping Championships, including two gold medals, and secured a bronze medal in the individual event in 1996. Bojda represented Poland at two FIS Nordic Junior World Ski Championships and participated in two team events at the FIS Ski Jumping World Cup. He also claimed two Polish junior championship titles.

== Career ==
Bojda began his competitive career in 1992, winning the Polish team championship in Nordic combined as part of KS Wisła, alongside Adam Małysz and Tomasz Wawrzacz. That same season, he earned silver and bronze medals in the Polish junior ski jumping championships for younger competitors.

The following winter, he placed 4th in the team Nordic combined event at the Polish Championships. He also finished 6th in the team event at the 1993 Polish Ski Jumping Championships in Szczyrk. In the individual competition, he placed 33rd, the last position. Earlier that year, in the youth national championships in Wisła, he took 8th place on the K-40 hill and 10th on the K-60 hill.

During the 1990s, Bojda trained for two years at the Skiing Gymnasium in Stams, Austria. From 1995 to 1999, he attended the Sports Mastery School in Zakopane.

=== 1993–94 season ===
In the inaugural 1993–94 FIS Ski Jumping Continental Cup (previously known as the FIS Ski Jumping Europa Cup), Bojda debuted on 9 March 1994 at Wielka Krokiew in Zakopane, jumping 80.5 m and finishing 53rd. The next day, he placed 40th on the normal hill. He competed in two more Continental Cup events in Štrbské Pleso, finishing 38th in the first and earning his first points with an 8th-place finish in the second, jumping 108.5 m – his career-best result and only top-10 finish. He ended the season ranked 156th with 32 points.

At the 1994 Polish Championships in Zakopane, he won a bronze medal in the team event. Individually, he placed 16th on the normal hill. That same month, he won two Polish junior championship titles in Wisła.

=== 1994–95 season ===
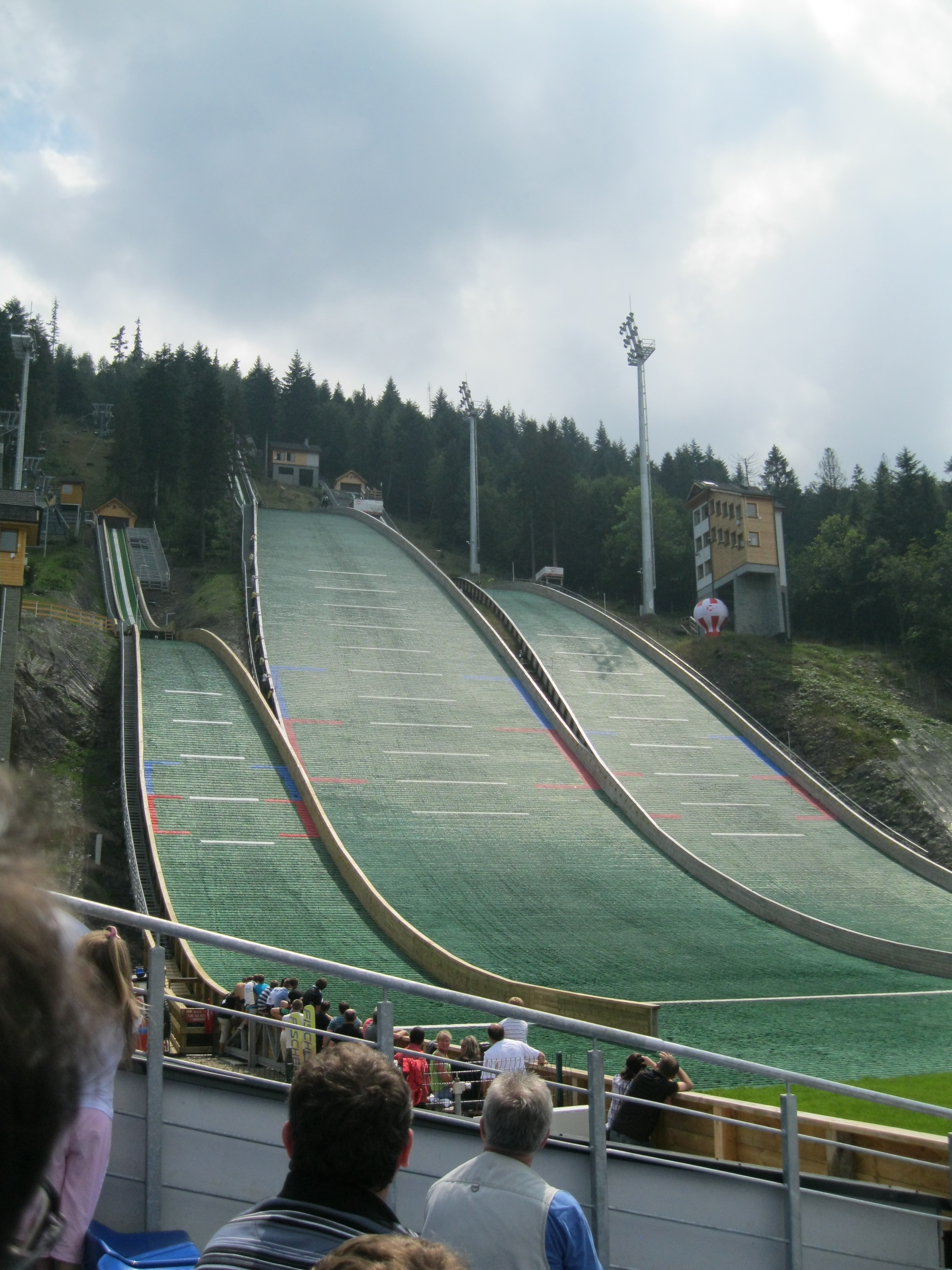
Skalite ski jump, where Bojda won his first Polish Championship gold medal

On 11 September 1994, Bojda competed in a summer Grand Prix event in Frenštát pod Radhoštěm, finishing 40th. In the 1994–95 FIS Ski Jumping Continental Cup, he debuted in January in Zakopane, placing 49th in the first event and being disqualified in the second. He competed in Austria and Germany in February, finishing in the 60s and 70s.

On 16 February 1995, in Szczyrk, he won the team gold medal at the Polish Ski Jumping Championships 1995. In the individual event on the normal hill, he placed 7th with jumps of 74.5 m and 64.5 m, and won a bronze medal in the junior competition.

At the 1995 FIS Nordic Junior World Ski Championships in Gällivare, Sweden, the Polish team finished 10th in the team event. Bojda jumped 66 m and 68 m, scoring nearly 100 points less than Adam Małysz. In the individual event, he jumped 72 m and 74.5 m, finishing 44th.

On 1 April 1995, at the Polish Championships on Wielka Krokiew, Bojda jumped 94.5 m and 89.5 m, finishing 4th (7th overall, including international competitors), one point behind bronze medalist Robert Mateja.

=== 1995–96 season ===
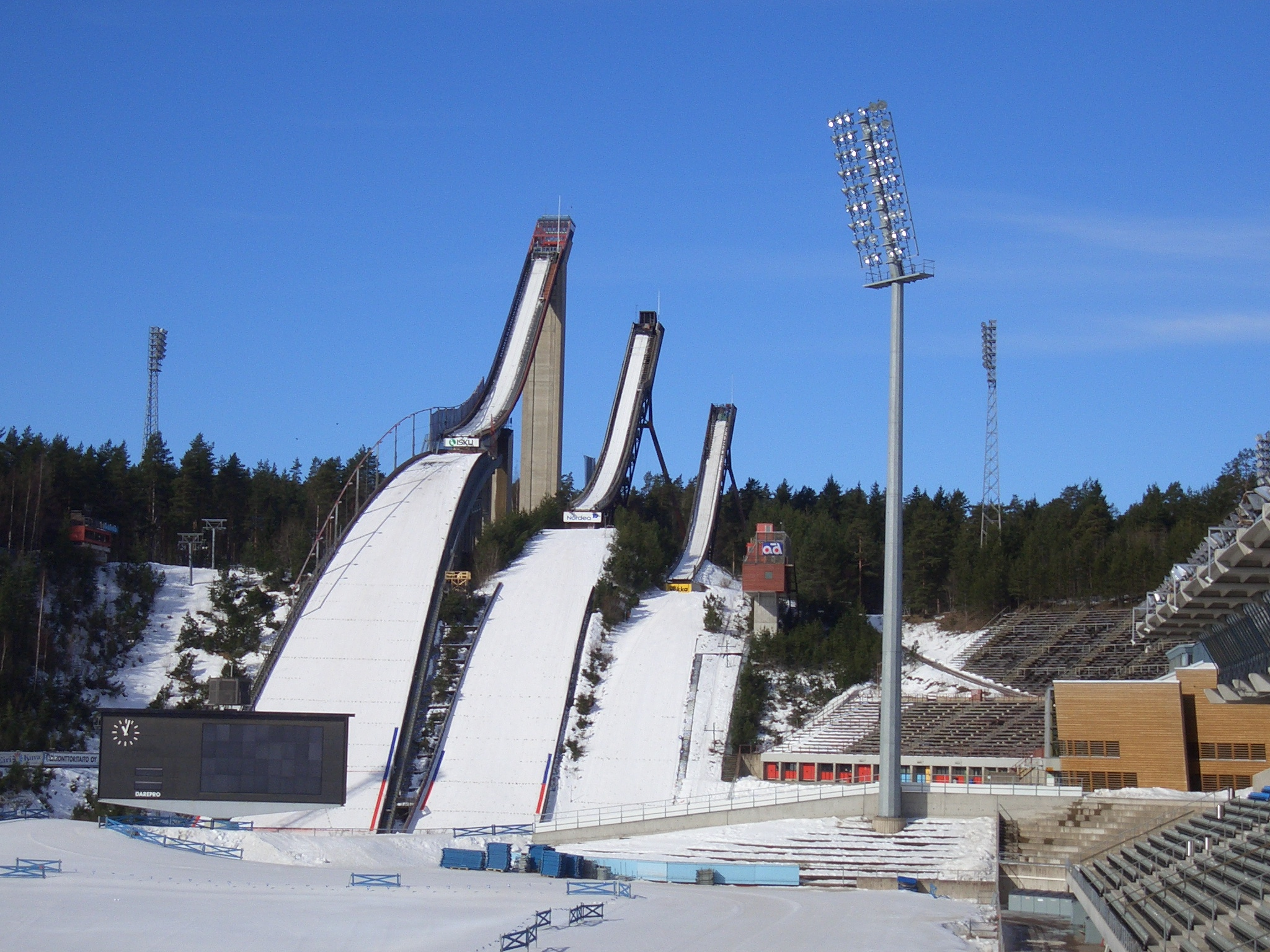
Ski jumps in Lahti, where Bojda placed 8th in a World Cup team event

In August 1995, Bojda finished 18th in the Góralski Kapelusz competition in Zakopane, featuring Polish and Slovak athletes. In September, he placed 49th at the Grand Prix in Frenštát. He also competed in the national Colonel Franciszek Wagner Memorial, finishing 9th overall and 3rd among juniors.

The 1995–96 FIS Ski Jumping Continental Cup began in December in Lauscha, where Bojda jumped 90 m and 90.5 m, finishing 29th and earning points for the second time in his career. He placed 36th in Brotterode, and in Lahti and Kuopio, he finished in the 70s and 80s. On 7 January, in Bad Goisern am Hallstättersee, he placed 84th. In Reit im Winkl, he earned points again, finishing 17th with two 85.5 m jumps. The next day in Saalfelden, he placed 19th, but did not score in Berchtesgaden.

During the Christmas competition on Wielka Krokiew, he finished 16th.

In late January, he entered qualifications for both 1995–96 FIS Ski Jumping World Cup events in Zakopane but failed to qualify. On 31 January 1996, at the 1996 FIS Nordic Junior World Ski Championships in Asiago, Italy, the Polish team finished 12th out of 17 teams. Bojda jumped 88 m and 93.5 m, earning the highest score on his team. In the individual event, he jumped 87.5 m and 87 m, finishing 20th.

At the Polish junior championships (part of the 2nd Polish Youth Olympic Days from 20 to 22 February), Bojda won two gold medals, triumphing on Średnia Krokiew (81.5 m and 84.5 m) and Wielka Krokiew (128.5 m and 118.5 m).

He was selected for Nordic World Cup events in late February and March but failed to qualify for individual competitions in Kuopio and Lahti. On 2 March, he competed in the team event at Salpausselkä in Lahti, where Poland finished 8th. Bojda jumped 84 m and 80 m. On 8 March, he returned to the Continental Cup, placing 28th in Bollnäs and 36th in Falun. He finished the season 158th with 31 points. On 15 March, he competed in another World Cup team event in Oslo, where Poland placed 10th. He jumped 93 m and 87.5 m.

At the 1996 Polish Championships in Zakopane, Bojda won a silver medal in the team event on 22 March, with his team losing the title by two points. The next day, he earned a bronze medal in the individual event with jumps of 79 m and 76 m, trailing winner Wojciech Skupień by 24.5 points. On the large hill, he placed 6th among Poles (11th overall). That year, he set an unofficial record at Wielka Krokiew with a 130.5 m jump.

On 30 March, he won the Sports Mastery School Championships on the normal hill in Zakopane, and in April, he placed 7th in the Easter competition on the large hill.

=== 1996–97 season ===
In July 1996, Bojda placed 13th in the international Mayor's Cup in Zakopane. In August, he competed in the 1996–97 FIS Ski Jumping Continental Cup in Zakopane, finishing 37th. At the 1996 Summer Polish Ski Jumping Championships, he placed 8th.

In January 1997, he competed in five Continental Cup events in Ramsau am Dachstein, Villach, Planica, and Oberhof, but failed to qualify for the main competitions. On 24 January in Štrbské Pleso, he reached the main event, finishing 38th. Two days later in Zakopane, he again failed to qualify. He ended the season without points.

On 25 January, he placed 23rd in the national Beskids Cup.

=== 1997–98 season ===
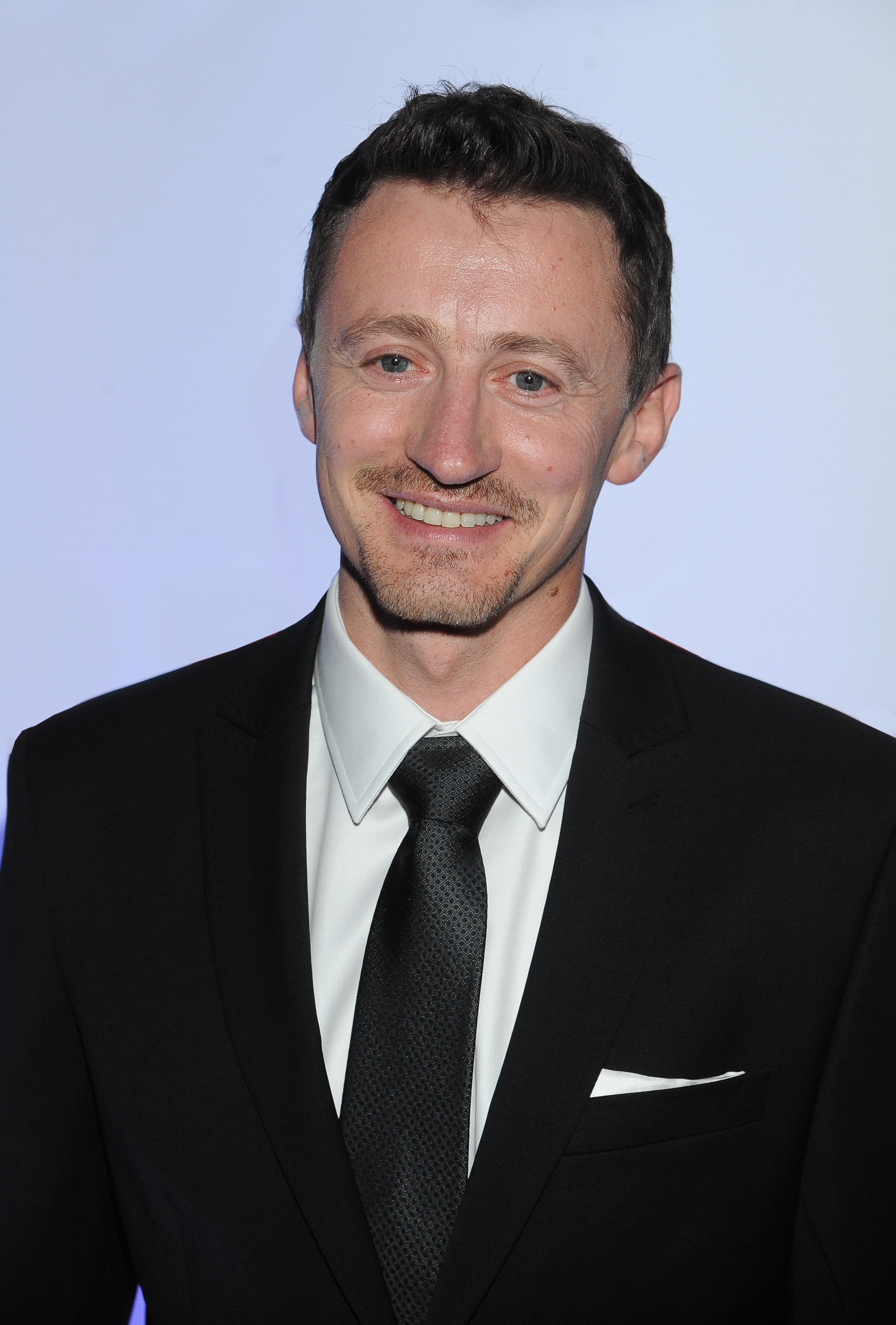
Adam Małysz, with whom Bojda won several Polish Championship medals

In the summer of 1997, Bojda competed in several national events, placing 22nd in the Mayor's Cup in Zakopane and 6th in the 90th-anniversary competition of BBTS Włókniarz Bielsko-Biała club.

In the 1997–98 FIS Ski Jumping Continental Cup, he placed 51st and 47th in Zakopane. On 4 October, at the Grand Prix in Frenštát, he finished 14th with jumps of 81 m and 83 m, the best result among Polish competitors. On 12 October, at the 1997 Summer Polish Ski Jumping Championships on Średnia Krokiew, he placed 13th (6th among Poles) with jumps of 73 m and 76.5 m. In December, he scored points in two Oberwiesenthal events, finishing 30th (77.5 m and 74.5 m) and 26th (79 m and 81 m).

In January 1998, he failed to qualify for two 1997–98 FIS Ski Jumping World Cup events in Zakopane, placing 66th (89.5 m) and 64th (84.5 m) in qualifications. He also failed to qualify for Continental Cup events in Villach and Reit im Winkl. In six further events, he placed in the 40s and 50s, finishing 267th overall with 6 points.

On 28 March 1998, he won his second team gold medal at the Polish Ski Jumping Championships 1998 in Zakopane. Individually, he placed 12th on the normal hill and 21st on the large hill among Poles.

Bojda was named to the Polish Olympic team for the 1998 Winter Olympics in Nagano but did not compete. In the summer of 1998, he placed 20th in the Mayor's Cup in Zakopane. He retired from competitive sports thereafter.

== Ski Jumping World Cup ==
=== Individual World Cup results ===
Source
1995–96 season
Lillehammer	Lillehammer	Villach	Planica	Predazzo	Chamonix	Chamonix	Oberhof	Oberstdorf	Garmisch-Partenkirchen	Innsbruck	Bischofshofen	Engelberg	Engelberg	Sapporo	Sapporo	Zakopane	Zakopane	Bad Mitterndorf	Bad Mitterndorf	Iron Mountain	Iron Mountain	Kuopio	Lahti	Lahti	Harrachov	Falun	Oslo	Points
-	-	-	-	-	-	-	-	-	-	-	-	-	-	-	-	q	q	-	-	-	-	q	q	q	-	-	-	0
1997–98 season
Lillehammer	Lillehammer	Predazzo	Villach	Harrachov	Engelberg	Engelberg	Oberstdorf	Garmisch-Partenkirchen	Innsbruck	Bischofshofen	Ramsau	Zakopane	Zakopane	Oberstdorf	Oberstdorf	Sapporo	Vikersund	Vikersund	Kuopio	Lahti	Lahti	Falun	Trondheim	Oslo	Planica	Planica	Points	
-	-	-	-	-	-	-	-	-	-	-	-	q	q	-	-	-	-	-	-	-	-	-	-	-	-	-	0	
Legend
1 2 3 4-10 11-30 Below 30 dq – Disqualified q – Disqualified in qualifications q – Did not qualify - – Did not compete

== Continental Cup ==
=== Overall standings ===
Season	Place
1993–94	156th
1994–95	Unranked
1995–96	169th
1996–97	Unranked
1997–98	267th

=== Individual Continental Cup results ===
Source
1993–94 season
Lillehammer	Lillehammer	Oberwiesenthal	Lauscha	Wörgl	Sankt Moritz	Sankt Aegyd	Gallio	Sapporo	Sapporo	Willingen	Willingen	Ironwood	Ironwood	Ruhpolding	Saalfelden	Planica	Iron Mountain	Iron Mountain	Ishpeming	Schönwald	Titisee-Neustadt	Calgary	Calgary	Zaō	Zakopane	Zakopane	Štrbské Pleso	Štrbské Pleso	Sprova	Sprova	Ruka	Rovaniemi	Points																	
-	-	-	-	-	-	-	-	-	-	-	-	-	-	-	-	-	-	-	-	-	-	-	-	-	53	40	38	8	-	-	-	-	32																	
1994–95 season
Lillehammer	Lillehammer	Jyväskylä	Lahti	Lahti	Sankt Moritz	Lake Placid	Lake Placid	Planica	Planica	Sapporo	Sapporo	Sapporo	Courchevel	Courchevel	Štrbské Pleso	Zakopane	Zakopane	Gallio	Gallio	Liberec	Liberec	Reit im Winkl	Saalfelden	Ruhpolding	Westby	Iron Mountain	Ishpeming	Sapporo	Zaō	Zaō	Schönwald	Schönwald	Sprova	Sprova	Ruka	Gällivare	Rovaniemi	Rovaniemi	Points											
-	-	-	-	-	-	-	-	-	-	-	-	-	-	-	-	dq	dq	-	-	-	-	52	68	51	-	-	-	-	-	-	-	-	-	-	-	-	-	-	0											
1995–96 season
Lauscha	Brotterode	Lahti	Lahti	Kuopio	Sankt Moritz	Lake Placid	Lake Placid	Bad Goisern	Reit im Winkl	Sapporo	Sapporo	Sapporo	Saalfelden	Berchtesgaden	Willingen	Liberec	Liberec	Seefeld	Westby	Westby	Gallio	Gallio	Örnsköldsvik	Örnsköldsvik	Schönwald	Titisee-Neustadt	Bollnäs	Sapporo	Beuil	Beuil	Falun	Zaō	Zaō	Planica	Planica	Voss	Voss	Rovaniemi	Ruka	Points										
29	36	75	69	67	-	-	-	84	17	-	-	-	19	51	-	-	-	-	-	-	-	-	-	-	-	-	28	-	-	-	36	-	-	-	-	-	-	-	-	31										
1996–97 season
Courchevel	Zakopane	Frenštát pod Radhoštěm	Hakuba	Hakuba	Muju	Muju	Chaux-Neuve	Chaux-Neuve	Brotterode	Lauscha	Sankt Moritz	Lake Placid	Lake Placid	Ramsau	Villach	Planica	Sapporo	Sapporo	Sapporo	Oberhof	Oberhof	Štrbské Pleso	Zakopane	Reit im Winkl	Westby	Westby	Saalfelden	Ruhpolding	Iron Mountain	Iron Mountain	Ishpeming	Ishpeming	Sapporo	Braunlage	Braunlage	Zaō	Zaō	Vikersund	Vikersund	Courchevel	Courchevel	Harrachov	Harrachov	Ruka	Rovaniemi	Points				
-	37	-	-	-	-	-	-	-	-	-	-	-	-	q	q	q	-	-	-	q	q	38	q	-	-	-	-	-	-	-	-	-	-	-	-	-	-	-	-	-	-	-	-	-	-	0				
1997–98 season
Velenje	Rælingen	Zakopane	Zakopane	Frenštát pod Radhoštěm	Frenštát pod Radhoštěm	Oberhof	Oberhof	Hakuba	Hakuba	Chamonix	Chamonix	Lahti	Lahti	Lahti	Oberwiesenthal	Oberwiesenthal	Sankt Moritz	Sapporo	Sapporo	Sapporo	Garmisch-Partenkirchen	Garmisch-Partenkirchen	Liberec	Liberec	Villach	Westby	Westby	Planica	Planica	Reit im Winkl	Iron Mountain	Iron Mountain	Saalfelden	Ruhpolding	Oslo	Willingen	Willingen	Ishpeming	Ishpeming	Schönwald	Schönwald	Sapporo	Zaō	Zaō	Courchevel	Courchevel	Rovaniemi	Ruka	Ruka	Points
-	-	51	47	-	-	-	-	-	-	-	-	-	-	-	30	26	-	-	-	-	-	-	-	-	q	-	-	-	-	q	-	-	33	38	-	-	-	-	-	38	43	-	-	-	39	44	-	-	-	6
Legend
1 2 3 4-10 11-30 Below 30 dq – Disqualified - – Did not compete

== Other achievements ==
- Team Polish Champion in Nordic combined (1992)
- Two-time Polish Junior Ski Jumping Champion (1996)
- Two-time Polish Junior (Younger) Ski Jumping Champion (1994)
- Sports Mastery School Champion (1996)
- Silver and bronze medalist, Polish Junior (Younger) Ski Jumping Championships (1992)
- Bronze Medalist, Polish Junior Ski Jumping Championships (1995)
- Bronze Medalist, TZN Championships, Colonel Franciszek Wagner Memorial (1995)
