= 1995–96 FIS Ski Flying World Cup =

Ski Flying World Cup 1995/96
Winners
- Overall: (Austria) Andreas Goldberger
- Nations Cup (unofficial): Austria

Competitions
- Venues: 2
- Individual: 3
- Cancelled: 1

The 1995/96 FIS Ski Flying World Cup was the 6th official World Cup season in ski flying awarded with small crystal globe as the subdiscipline of FIS Ski Jumping World Cup.

== Map of World Cup hosts ==
(Austria) Bad Mitterndorf	(Czech Republic) Harrachov
Kulm	Čerťák
Europe

== Calendar ==
=== Men's Individual ===
All	No.	Date	Place (Hill)	Size	Winner	Second	Third	Ski flying leader	R.
FIS World Cup 1995/96 = FIS Ski Flying World Championships 1996 (10 – 11 February • Bad Mitterndorf)
372	1	10 February 1996	(Austria) Bad Mitterndorf (Kulm K185)	F _{031}	(Finland) Janne Ahonen	(Austria) Andreas Goldberger	(Finland) Ari-Pekka Nikkola	(Finland) Janne Ahonen	
373	2	11 February 1996	(Austria) Bad Mitterndorf (Kulm K185)	F _{032}	(Austria) Andreas Goldberger	(Germany) Christof Duffner	(Finland) Janne Ahonen	(Austria) Andreas Goldberger	
379	3	9 March 1996	(Czech Republic) Harrachov (Čerťák K180)	F _{033}	(Austria) Andreas Goldberger	(Germany) Christof Duffner	(Czech Republic) Jaroslav Sakala	(Austria) Andreas Goldberger	
		10 March 1996	(Czech Republic) Harrachov (Čerťák K180)	F _{cnx}	cancelled after only two jums in 1st round due to strong wind			—	
6th FIS Ski Flying Men's Overall (10 February – 9 March 1996)					(Austria) Andreas Goldberger	(Finland) Janne Ahonen	(Germany) Christof Duffner	Ski Flying Overall	

FIS Ski Jumping World Cup / FIS Ski Flying World Cup / FIS Ski Flying World Championships

== Standings ==
=== Ski Flying ===
Rank	after 3 events	10/02/1996 Kulm	11/02/1996 Kulm	09/03/1996 Harrachov	Total
	(Austria) Andreas Goldberger	80	100	100	280
2	(Finland) Janne Ahonen	100	60	26	186
3	(Germany) Christof Duffner	16	80	80	176
4	(Slovenia) Urban Franc	50	50	32	132
5	(Finland) Ari-Pekka Nikkola	60	16	20	96
	(Czech Republic) Jaroslav Sakala	—	36	60	96
7	(Norway) Roar Ljøkelsøy	22	26	45	93
8	(Germany) Jens Weißflog	45	45	—	90
9	(Austria) Reinhard Schwarzenberger	24	22	29	75
10	(Norway) Espen Bredesen	36	22	14	72
11	(Finland) Jani Soininen	22	8	40	70
12	(Japan) Jinya Nishikata	29	18	22	69
13	(Czech Republic) Jakub Sucháček	15	32	18	65
14	(Norway) Eirik Halvorsen	40	15	8	63
15	(Finland) Mika Laitinen	—	—	50	50
16	(Czech Republic) František Jež	26	14	6	46
	(Austria) Andreas Widhölzl	6	40	—	46
18	(Poland) Adam Małysz	32	13	—	45
19	(Japan) Kazuyoshi Funaki	12	12	15	39
20	(France) Nicolas Jean-Prost	9	29	—	38
21	(Norway) Sturle Holseter	—	—	36	36
22	(Slovenia) Robert Meglič	4	26	—	30
23	(Italy) Roberto Cecon	18	—	7	25
24	(Japan) Hiroya Saitō	—	—	24	24
25	(Germany) Gerd Siegmund	11	2	10	23
26	(Czech Republic) Jakub Jiroutek	13	6	—	19
	(Japan) Noriaki Kasai	10	9	—	19
28	(France) Nicolas Dessum	8	10	—	18
	(Germany) Ralph Gebstedt	7	11	—	18
30	(Japan) Yukitaka Fukita	—	—	16	16
31	(Slovenia) Samo Gostiša	5	5	5	15
32	(Austria) Stefan Horngacher	14	—	—	14
33	(Czech Republic) Michal Doležal	—	1	12	13
	(Norway) Lasse Ottesen	—	—	13	13
35	(Germany) Alexander Herr	—	—	11	11
36	(Switzerland) Bruno Reuteler	3	7	—	10
37	(Japan) Naoki Yasuzaki	—	—	9	9
38	(Finland) Kimmo Savolainen	2	—	4	6
39	(Switzerland) Sylvain Freiholz	1	3	—	4
	(France) Didier Mollard	—	4	—	4
41	(Czech Republic) Robert Schlup	—	—	3	3
42	(Czech Republic) Martin Skoták	—	—	2	2
43	(Norway) Frode Håre	—	—	1	1

=== Nations Cup (unofficial) ===
Rank	after 3 events	Points
1	Austria	415
2	Finland	408
3	Germany	318
4	Norway	278
5	Czech Republic	244
6	Slovenia	177
7	Japan	176
8	France	60
9	Poland	45
10	Italy	25
11	Switzerland	14
