= 1992–93 FIS Ski Jumping Europa (Continental) Cup =

Ski-jumping competition series

FIS Europa/Continental Cup 1992/93
Winners
- Overall: (Austria) Franz Neuländtner

Competitions
- Venues: 16
- Individual: 22

The 1992/93 FIS Ski Jumping Europa Cup was the 13th and the last Europa Cup season in ski jumping for men and at the same counts as the 2nd Continental Cup winter season in ski jumping. Europa Cup was a predecessor of Continental Cup with events held only in Europe.

European Cup competitions included more than just competitors from the European continent, but the standings at the end of each season included only European competitors. Ski jumpers from Asia and North America were classified in the separated Pacific Rim Cup.

Other competitive circuits this season included the World Cup season.

== Men's Individual ==
Individual events in the CC history

Total	L	N	Winners
43	13	30	31

after normal hill event in Gällivare (4 April 1993)

=== Calendar ===
EC	CC	No.	Date	Place (Hill)	Size	Winner	Second	Third
251	22	1	12 December 1992	(Germany) Oberwiesenthal (Fichtelbergschanzen K90)	N _{015}	(Austria) Werner Haim	(Austria) Christian Reinthaler	(Norway) Frode Håre
252	23	2	13 December 1992	(Germany) Oberwiesenthal (Fichtelbergschanzen K90)	N _{016}	(Germany) Hansjörg Jäkle	(Austria) Christian Reinthaler	(Austria) Werner Haim
253	24	3	26 December 1992	(Switzerland) St. Moritz (Olympiaschanze K95)	N _{017}	(Switzerland) Martin Trunz	(France) Jérôme Gay	(Switzerland) Stephan Zünd
254	25	4	19 December 1992	(Austria) St. Aegyd (Klaushoferschanze K73)	N _{018}	(Austria) Mario Stecher	(Austria) Christian Moser	(Austria) Christian Reinthaler
255	26	5	8 January 1993	(Slovenia) Planica (Srednja Bloudkova K90)	N _{019}	(Slovenia) Franci Petek	(Kazakhstan) Dionis Vodnev	(Norway) Bengt Heiestad
256	27	6	9 January 1993	(Slovenia) Planica (Srednja Bloudkova K90)	N _{020}	(Slovenia) Samo Gostiša	(Norway) Knut Müller	(Austria) Christian Moser
4th Alps-Adria-Tournament Overall (8 – 9 January 1993)						(Slovenia) Franci Petek	(Slovenia) Samo Gostiša	(Norway) Knut Müller
257	28	7	10 January 1993	(Austria) Wörgl (Latella-Schanze K83)	N _{021}	(Austria) Stefan Horngacher	(Norway) Knut Müller	(Austria) Heinz Kuttin
258	29	8	16 January 1993	(Germany) Willingen (Mühlenkopfschanze K120)	L _{008}	(Norway) Helge Brendryen	(Finland) Tero Koponen	(Norway) Clas-Brede Bråthen
259	30	9	17 January 1993	(Germany) Willingen (Mühlenkopfschanze K120)	L _{009}	(Finland) Toni Nieminen	(Norway) Christian Moser	(Germany) André Kiesewetter
260	31	10	30 January 1993	(Italy) Gallio (Trampolino di Pakstall K92)	N _{022}	(Germany) Dieter Thoma	(Austria) Christian Moser	(Norway) Knut Müller
261	32	11	31 January 1993	(Italy) Gallio (Trampolino di Pakstall K92)	N _{023}	(Germany) Dieter Thoma	(Austria) Andreas Widhölzl	(Germany) Gerd Siegmund
262	33	12	20 February 1993	(Poland) Zakopane (Wielka Krokiew K116)	L _{010}	(Austria) Werner Haim	(Germany) Sven Hannawald (Austria) Werner Schuster	
263	34	13	21 February 1993	(Poland) Szczyrk (Skalite K85)	N _{024}	(Austria) Christian Moser	(Austria) Franz Wiegele	(Norway) Knut Müller
FIS Nordic World Ski Championships 1993 (21 – 27 February • (Sweden) Falun)
264	35	14	27 February 1993	(Germany) Titisee-Neustadt (Hochfirstschanze K112) (Note: Not clear if Hochfirstschanze hill in Titisee-Neustadt had K-point at K112 or K113 at that time.)	L _{011}	(Norway) Frode Håre	(Austria) Werner Haim	(Austria) Christian Moser
265	36	15	28 February 1993	(Germany) Schönwald (Adlerschanzen Schönwald K84)	N _{025}	(Austria) Franz Neuländtner	(Austria) Christian Moser	(Austria) Gerhard Gattinger
22nd Schwarzwald Tournament Overall (27 – 28 February 1993)						(Austria) Christian Moser	(Austria) Werner Haim	(Austria) Franz Neuländtner
266	37	16	7 March 1993	(France) Chamonix (Le Mont K95)	N _{026}	(Austria) Franz Neuländtner	(Austria) Werner Schuster	(Austria) Klaus Huber
267	38	17	13 March 1993	(Germany) Oberhof (Hans-Renner-Schanze K120)	L _{012}	(Austria) Matthias Wallner	(Austria) Werner Schuster	(Austria) Franz Neuländtner
268	39	18	19 March 1993	(Norway) Sprova (Steinfjellbakken K85)	N _{027}	(Norway) Pål Hansen	(Germany) Hansjörg Jäkle	(Norway) Stein Henrik Tuff
269	40	19	20 March 1993	(Norway) Sprova (Steinfjellbakken K85)	N _{028}	(Norway) Knut Müller	(Norway) Geir Atle Wøien	(Norway) Pål Hansen
270	41	20	27 March 1993	(Finland) Ruka (Rukatunturi K120)	L _{013}	(Finland) Toni Nieminen	(Austria) Gerhard Schallert	(Norway) Geir Atle Wøien
271	42	21	3 April 1993	(Sweden) Gällivare (Dundretkullen K90)	N _{029}	(Austria) Gerhard Schallert	(Austria) Franz Neuländtner	(Austria) Christian Moser
272	43	22	4 April 1993	(Sweden) Gällivare (Dundretkullen K90)	N _{030}	(Austria) Gerhard Schallert	(Austria) Christian Moser	(Norway) Geir Atle Wøien
13th FIS Europa Cup Overall = 2nd FIS Continental Cup Overall (12 December 1992 – 4 April 1993)						(Austria) Franz Neuländtner	(Austria) Christian Moser	(Norway) Knut Müller

== Standings ==
=== Overall ===
Rank	after 22 events	Points
1	(Austria) Franz Neuländtner	211
2	(Austria) Christian Moser	198
3	(Norway) Knut Müller	152
4	(Austria) Werner Schuster	132
5	(Germany) Hansjörg Jäkle	119
6	(Austria) Werner Haim	112
7	(Norway) Geir Atle Wøien	103
8	(Austria) Christian Reinthaler	102
9	(Austria) Gerhard Schallert	87
10	(Germany) André Kiesewetter	67

== Europa Cup vs. Continental Cup ==
- This was originally last Europa Cup season and is also recognized as the first Continental Cup season by International Ski Federation although under the "Continental Cup" name began its first official season in 1993/94.

== See also ==
- 1992–93 FIS World Cup
