= Sergei Bobrov =

Belarusian ski jumper (born 1978)

Sergei Bobrov (Belarusian: Сяргей Баброў; Russian: Сергей Бобров; born 1978) is a Belarusian former ski jumper. His greatest achievement was winning the gold medal in the large hill event at the 1999 Winter Universiade in Poprad, held at Štrbské Pleso. He holds the record for the MS 1970 A ski jump in Štrbské Pleso, set at 128.5 meters during the Universiade.

Bobrov earned 10 points in the Continental Cup, with his best finish being 24th, but never scored points in the World Cup, where his highest placement was 39th on 24 January 1998 at the Heini-Klopfer-Skiflugschanze in Oberstdorf. He also competed in the FIS Ski Flying World Championships 1998, finishing 41st, and the FIS Nordic World Ski Championships 1999, placing 67th (normal hill) and 68th (large hill). He ceased competing internationally after March 1999.

== Career ==
Bobrov debuted internationally at the 1994 Junior World Ski Championships in Breitenwang. On 27 January 1994, he competed in the team event, where Belarus finished 12th out of 17 teams. However, Bobrov jumped poorly, achieving only 53 and 52 meters (the best jumpers reached distances over 80 meters). This resulted in the 5th-to-last individual score in that competition. Bobrov performed the worst in the Belarusian team, earning just 75.5 points in two jumps, while the second-worst result from the Belarusian team was 116.5 points (achieved by Ivan Tutokau). Three days later, in the individual competition, he finished 65th (out of 73 competitors) with a total score of 94.5 points (after jumps of 56.5 and 56 meters). On 26 February 1994, he made his debut in Continental Cup events for the first time. In Schönwald im Schwarzwald, he placed 65th, and the next day in Titisee-Neustadt, he finished two places higher. These were his last starts on the international arena in the season.

In the 1995 season, he competed only at the 1995 Junior World Ski Championships in Gällivare, placing 62nd with jumps of 61 and 59.5 meters, ahead of only two competitors. At the 1996 Junior World Ski Championships in Asiago, he finished 50th. In March 1996, he achieved his best Continental Cup result at the time, placing 36th in Planica with jumps of 105 and 97 meters. In January 1996, he placed 4th in the Tatra Ski Association Championships for athletes born in 1978 or younger (out of 25 competitors).

In October 1996, Bobrov competed in the 1996 Polish Summer Ski Jumping Championships in Zakopane, finishing 49th. He started the international season in the Continental Cup in Frenštát pod Radhoštěm, failing to qualify. On 14–15 December 1996, he debuted in the World Cup in Harrachov, but failed to advance past qualifications. In the 1996–97 season, he competed in four Continental Cup events, qualifying only in Štrbské Pleso, where he finished 49th. He also placed 4th in the Beskidy Ski Association Championships and 29th in the Beskids Cup in Wisła.

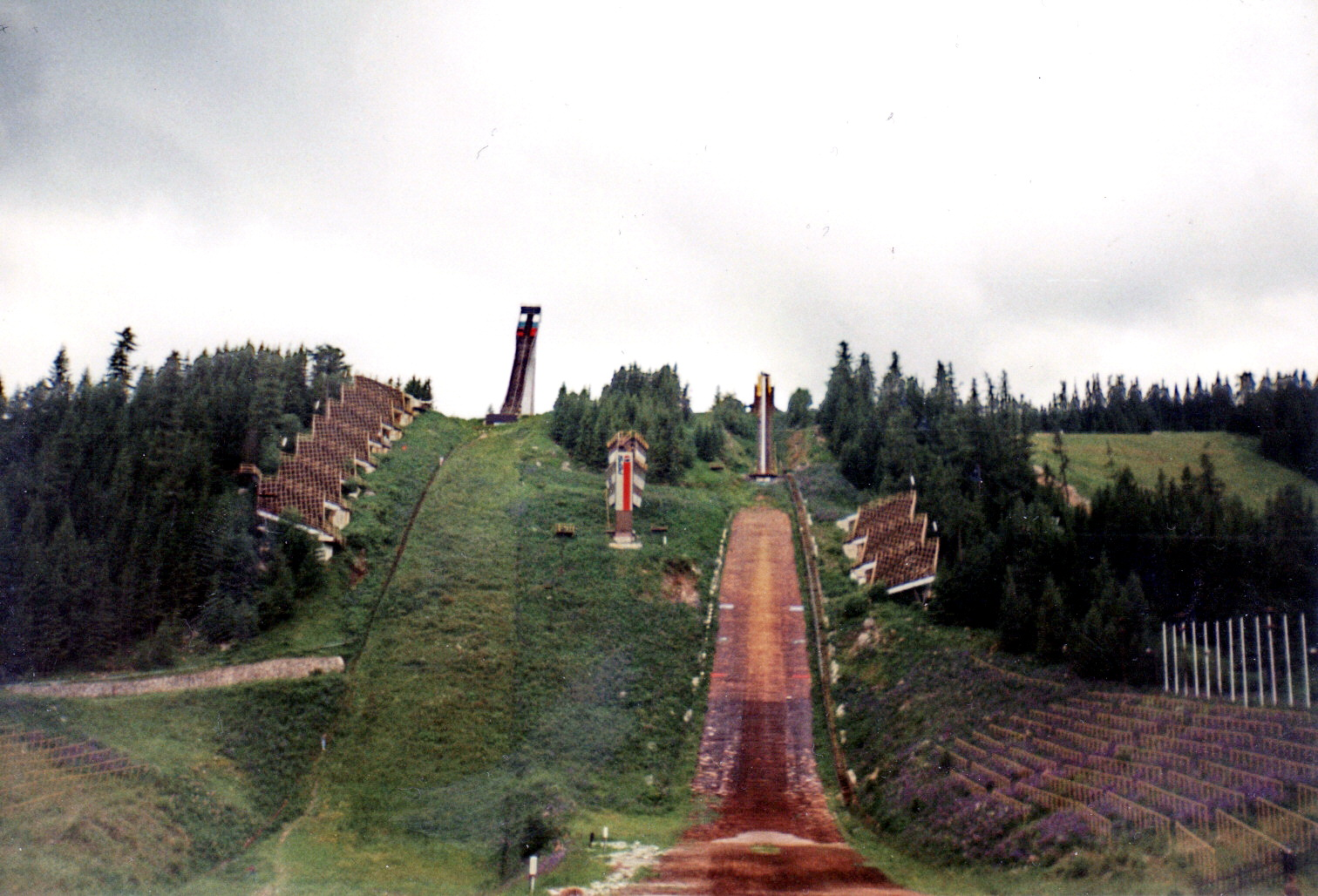
MS 1970 A ski jump (left) in 1997, where Sergei Bobrov won the 1999 Universiade gold medal

In the 1997–98 season, Bobrov competed more frequently. In July 1997, he placed 35th in the Beskids Cup. He failed to qualify in four Continental Cup events in August and September and placed 37th in the 1997 Polish Summer Ski Jumping Championships. On 12 December 1997, he failed to qualify for the World Cup in Harrachov. In late December, he competed in three Continental Cup events in Lahti, with a best of 39th. In January 1998, he failed to qualify for the World Cup in Zakopane.

On 24 and 25 January 1998, he competed at the FIS Ski Flying World Championships 1998 in Oberstdorf. After jumps of 95 meters and 92 meters, he placed 41st out of 45 competitors with a total score of 116.9 points. These events also counted as World Cup competitions, marking Bobrov's only career starts in main events of the highest level. On the first day, he achieved his career-best 39th place, while on the second day, he finished 41st in the classification.

From 7 to 22 February 1998, he competed in six Continental Cup events in the US. In the first competition in Westby, he finished 33rd, but the next day, he achieved a career milestone by placing in the top 30 for the first time, earning one point for 30th place. The following weekend in Iron Mountain (14 and 15 February 1998), he earned two more points with two 30th-place finishes. In the final two American events in Ishpeming, he finished outside the top 30.

On 15 and 16 August 1998, he began his final season with two Continental Cup events in Zakopane. In the first event, he earned 7 points for 24th place, which remained his best result in competitions of this level. The next day, he finished outside the top 30. Later, he participated in three qualifying events for the Four Hills Tournament, where he was eliminated. Before the Four Hills Tournament, he also competed in a Christmas ski jumping event in Zakopane on an unspecified date in December 1998, finishing 22nd out of 62 competitors.

At the end of January 1999, he competed in the 1999 Winter Universiade, where he achieved the greatest success of his career. He won a gold medal in a single-round competition on the HS-125 ski jump in Štrbské Pleso (although the Universiade itself was organized in Poprad), jumping 128.5 meters and earning 125.3 points, beating the 2nd-place competitor by 3.1 points. Bobrov set a record on the MS 1970 A ski jump. On 21 and 26 February 1999, he made his final appearance at a major international event, the World Championships in Ramsau. He finished last in 67th place on the large hill (competed in Bischofshofen) and second-to-last in 68th place on the small hill, jumping 66.5 meters and outperforming only Jeroen Nikkel. His performance on the large hill was so poor (55 meters) that he received a score of 0.0 points. He retired from international competition after these events.

== World Cup ==
=== Individual World Cup results ===
Source
1996/1997 Season
| Lillehammer | Lillehammer | Ruka | Ruka | Harrachov | Harrachov | Oberstdorf | Garmisch-Partenkirchen | Innsbruck | Bischofshofen | Engelberg | Engelberg | Sapporo | Sapporo | Hakuba | Willingen | Willingen | Bad Mitterndorf | Bad Mitterndorf | Lahti | Kuopio | Falun | Oslo | Planica | Planica | Points | | | | |
| – | – | – | – | q | q | – | – | – | – | – | – | – | – | – | – | – | – | – | – | – | – | – | – | – | 0 | | | | |
1997/1998 Season
| Lillehammer | Lillehammer | Predazzo | Villach | Harrachov | Engelberg | Engelberg | Oberstdorf | Garmisch-Partenkirchen | Innsbruck | Bischofshofen | Ramsau | Zakopane | Zakopane | Oberstdorf | Oberstdorf | Sapporo | Vikersund | Vikersund | Kuopio | Lahti | Lahti | Falun | Trondheim | Oslo | Planica | Planica | Points | | |
| – | – | – | – | q | – | – | – | – | – | – | – | q | q | 39 | 41 | – | – | – | – | – | – | – | – | – | – | – | 0 | | |
1998/1999 Season
| Lillehammer | Lillehammer | Chamonix | Chamonix | Predazzo | Oberhof | Harrachov | Harrachov | Oberstdorf | Garmisch-Partenkirchen | Innsbruck | Bischofshofen | Engelberg | Engelberg | Zakopane | Zakopane | Sapporo | Sapporo | Willingen | Willingen | Harrachov | Kuopio | Lahti | Trondheim | Falun | Oslo | Planica | Planica | Planica | Points |
| – | – | – | – | – | – | q | q | q | q | q | – | – | – | – | – | – | – | – | – | – | – | – | – | – | – | – | – | – | 0 |
Legend
1 2 3 4–10 11–30 Below 30 dq – Disqualified q – Disqualified in qualifications q – Did not qualify – – Did not start

== Continental Cup ==
=== Overall standings ===
| Season | Place |
|---|---|
| 1997/1998 | 288th |
| 1998/1999 | 262nd |

=== Individual Continental Cup results ===
Source
1993/1994 Season
| Lillehammer | Lillehammer | Oberwiesenthal | Lauscha | Wörgl | Sankt Moritz | Sankt Aegyd | Gallio | Sapporo | Sapporo | Willingen | Willingen | Ironwood | Ironwood | Ruhpolding | Saalfelden | Planica | Iron Mountain | Iron Mountain | Ishpeming | Schönwald | Titisee-Neustadt | Calgary | Calgary | Zaō | Zakopane | Zakopane | Štrbské Pleso | Štrbské Pleso | Sprova | Sprova | Ruka | Rovaniemi | Points | | | | | | | | | | | | | | | | | | |
| – | – | – | – | – | – | – | – | – | – | – | – | – | – | – | – | – | – | – | – | 65 | 63 | – | – | – | – | – | – | – | – | – | – | – | 0 | | | | | | | | | | | | | | | | | | |
1995/1996 Season
| Lauscha | Brotterode | Lahti | Lahti | Kuopio | Sankt Moritz | Lake Placid | Lake Placid | Bad Goisern | Reit im Winkl | Sapporo | Sapporo | Sapporo | Saalfelden | Berchtesgaden | Willingen | Liberec | Liberec | Seefeld | Westby | Westby | Gallio | Gallio | Örnsköldsvik | Örnsköldsvik | Schönwald | Titisee-Neustadt | Bollnäs | Sapporo | Beuil | Beuil | Falun | Zaō | Zaō | Planica | Planica | Voss | Voss | Rovaniemi | Ruka | Points | | | | | | | | | | | |
| – | – | – | – | – | – | – | – | – | – | – | – | – | – | – | – | – | – | – | – | – | – | – | – | – | 46 | – | – | – | – | – | – | – | – | – | 36 | – | – | – | – | 0 | | | | | | | | | | | |
1996/1997 Season
| Courchevel | Zakopane | Frenštát pod Radhoštěm | Hakuba | Hakuba | Muju | Muju | Chaux-Neuve | Chaux-Neuve | Brotterode | Lauscha | Sankt Moritz | Lake Placid | Lake Placid | Ramsau | Villach | Planica | Sapporo | Sapporo | Sapporo | Oberhof | Oberhof | Štrbské Pleso | Zakopane | Reit im Winkl | Westby | Westby | Saalfelden | Ruhpolding | Iron Mountain | Iron Mountain | Ishpeming | Ishpeming | Sapporo | Braunlage | Braunlage | Zaō | Zaō | Vikersund | Vikersund | Courchevel | Courchevel | Harrachov | Harrachov | Ruka | Rovaniemi | Points | | | | | |
| – | – | q | – | – | – | – | – | – | q | q | – | – | – | – | – | – | – | – | – | – | – | 49 | q | – | – | – | – | – | – | – | – | – | – | – | – | – | – | – | – | – | – | – | – | – | – | 0 | | | | | |
1997/1998 Season
| Velenje | Rælingen | Zakopane | Zakopane | Frenštát pod Radhoštěm | Frenštát pod Radhoštěm | Oberhof | Oberhof | Hakuba | Hakuba | Chamonix | Chamonix | Lahti | Lahti | Lahti | Oberwiesenthal | Oberwiesenthal | Sankt Moritz | Sapporo | Sapporo | Sapporo | Garmisch-Partenkirchen | Garmisch-Partenkirchen | Liberec | Liberec | Villach | Westby | Westby | Planica | Planica | Reit im Winkl | Iron Mountain | Iron Mountain | Saalfelden | Ruhpolding | Oslo | Willingen | Willingen | Ishpeming | Ishpeming | Schönwald | Schönwald | Sapporo | Zaō | Zaō | Courchevel | Courchevel | Rovaniemi | Ruka | Ruka | Points | |
| – | – | q | q | q | q | – | – | – | – | – | – | 48 | 40 | 39 | – | – | – | – | – | – | – | – | – | – | – | 33 | 30 | – | – | – | 30 | 30 | – | – | – | – | – | 35 | 34 | – | – | – | – | – | – | – | – | – | – | 3 | |
1998/1999 Season
| Velenje | Velenje | Berchtesgaden | Villach | Oberstdorf | Oberstdorf | Zakopane | Zakopane | Rælingen | Kuopio | Lahti | Lahti | Sankt Moritz | Engelberg | Bad Goisern | Bad Goisern | Sapporo | Sapporo | Sapporo | Lauscha | Lauscha | Gallio | Gallio | Reit im Winkl | Saalfelden | Ruhpolding | Braunlage | Braunlage | Westby | Westby | Planica | Planica | Titisee-Neustadt | Iron Mountain | Schönwald | Ishpeming | Ishpeming | Ishpeming | Sapporo | Zaō | Zaō | Courchevel | Courchevel | Vikersund | Vikersund | Hede | Hede | Kuopio | Rovaniemi | Ruka | Ruka | Points |
| – | – | – | – | – | – | 24 | 41 | – | – | – | – | – | – | – | – | – | – | – | – | – | – | – | – | – | – | – | – | – | – | – | – | – | – | – | – | – | – | – | – | – | – | – | – | – | – | – | – | – | – | 7 | |
Legend
1 2 3 4–10 11–30 Below 30 dq – Disqualified – – Did not start
