= 1995 FIS Ski Jumping Grand Prix =

Grand Prix 1995
Winners
- Overall: (Austria) Andreas Goldberger

Competitions
- Venues: 4
- Individual: 4

The 1995 FIS Ski Jumping Grand Prix was the 2nd Summer Grand Prix season in ski jumping on plastic. Season began on 19 August 1995 in Kuopio, Finland and ended on 3 September 1995 in Stams, Austria.

Other competitive circuits this season included the World Cup and Continental Cup.

== Calendar ==
=== Men ===
All	No.	Date	Place (Hill)	Size	Winner	Second	Third	Overall leader	R.
		18 August 1995	(Finland) Kuopio (Puijo K90)	N _{cnx}	cancelled due to strong wind and rescheduled on 19 August			—	
4	1	19 August 1995	(Finland) Kuopio (Puijo K90)	N _{004}	(Japan) Kazuyoshi Funaki	(Austria) Andreas Goldberger	(Switzerland) Bruno Reuteler	(Japan) Kazuyoshi Funaki	
5	2	20 August 1995	(Norway) Trondheim (Granåsen K120)	L _{001}	(Czech Republic) Zbyněk Krompolc	(Austria) Andreas Goldberger	(Germany) Rico Meinel	(Austria) Andreas Goldberger	
6	3	27 August 1995	(Germany) Hinterzarten (Rothaus-Schanze K90)	N _{005}	(Austria) Andreas Goldberger	(Czech Republic) Jaroslav Sakala	(Japan) Hiroya Saito	(Austria) Andreas Goldberger	
7	4	3 September 1995	(Austria) Stams (Brunnentalschanze K105)	N _{006}	(Austria) Karl-Heinz Dorner	(Japan) Hiroya Saito	(Japan) Kazuyoshi Funaki	(Austria) Andreas Goldberger	

== Standings ==
=== Overall ===
Rank	after 4 events	Points
1	(Austria) Andreas Goldberger	1007.4
2	(Japan) Kazuyoshi Funaki	956.1
3	(Finland) Ari-Pekka Nikkola	935.6
4	(Finland) Mika Laitinen	913.8
5	(Finland) Janne Ahonen	888.3
