= Nikolai Aseyev =

Russian poet (1889–1963)

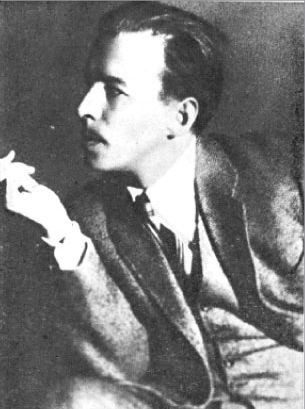
Nikolai Aseyev

Nikolai Nikolayevich Aseyev (Russian: Никола́й Никола́евич Асе́ев, IPA: [nʲɪkɐˈlaj nʲɪkɐˈlajɪvʲɪtɕ ɐˈsʲejɪf]; July 10, 1889 - July 16, 1963) was a Russian and Soviet Futurist poet and writer.

== Biography ==
Aseyev was born in the city of Lgov in the region of Kursk. He studied a technical school in the city and had also attended the Moscow Institute of Commerce. Aseyev joined the army in 1915 until 1917.

It is said that Velimir Khlebnikov and Vladimir Mayakovsky were two of Aseyev's literary influences.

His mother died before he was eight, and he was raised in part by his maternal grandfather. After graduating from the Kursk Real School in 1907, Aseyev studied at the Moscow Commercial Institute and later at the history and philology faculties of Moscow and Kharkov universities. In 1914, he co-founded the poetry circle Lirika with Sergei Bobrov and Boris Pasternak, and became a member of the Futurist group Centrifuga. Drafted in 1915, he was discharged due to tuberculosis. During the Russian Civil War, he lived in the Far East, where he worked alongside Sergei Tretyakov and David Burliuk in the literary group Tvorchestvo ("Creativity"). In 1922, he was called to Moscow by Anatoly Lunacharsky and became a core member of the LEF (Left Front of the Arts) group, which he helped lead from 1923 to 1928.

== Works ==
In 1914, his first poetic collections, "Night Flute" (Nochnaia fleita) and "Zor", which were written in the Russian Futurist style, were published. The former also reflected traces of Russian Symbolism.

Aseyev's work has been known for its interest in America. Among his notable poems was A Song about Alabama, which criticized the American conceptualization of a crime punishable by death for blacks. He was also one of those who contributed to the Soviet and American reconciliation narrative. He once wrote the Americans, "You have Abraham, we have a Joseph... let's make a new Bible."

Aseyev's long poem Mayakovsky Begins (Маяковский начинается, 1940) was a biographical work about his friend and fellow Futurist Vladimir Mayakovsky. It received the Stalin Prize, first class, in 1941. His popular verse "Budyonny March" (1922), set to music, became a widely known Soviet song. Aseyev died in Moscow on 16 July 1963 and was buried at Novodevichy Cemetery.
