= Reinthaler =

Reinthaler is a German surname. Notable people with the surname include:

- Carl Martin Reinthaler (1822–1896), German organist, composer and conductor
- Christian Reinthaler (born 1974), Austrian ski jumper
- Max Reinthaler (born 1995), Italian footballer
