= Franz Ketterer =

German clockmaker

Franz Ketterer (1676–1749) was an early Black Forest clockmaker from Schönwald im Schwarzwald in Germany. According to historians, he was one of several possible inventors of the cuckoo clock, although historical records from this period are scarce and often conflicting, and no cuckoo clock made by Ketterer can be found today. In his 1976 book Gerd Bender suggested that Franz Ketterer invented prototype cuckoo clocks in 1730. (Note: Karl Karmarsch wrote in his article on "Dilger, Simon" for the Allgemeine Deutsche Biographie (1877) that the cuckoo clock was invented by Anton Ketterer, speculating that he was the son of Franz Ketterer.) Others have suggested that the cuckoo clock was invented around 1735, 1737, or 1738.

According to author Karl Kochmann, Franz Ketterer and his wife Anna (née Winterhalder) had nine children; their youngest child and only son was born in 1734. Named Franz Anton Ketterer, he also became a clockmaker.

In 1993, the renovated festival hall in Schönwald was dedicated to Franz Ketterer and named the Uhrmacher-Ketterer-Halle. The Black Forest Museum in Schönwald offers information about how Ketterer may have come to invent the cuckoo clock.
