= 1997 FIS Ski Jumping Grand Prix =

International ski jumping competition

Grand Prix 1997
Winners
- Overall: (Japan) Masahiko Harada

Competitions
- Venues: 5
- Individual: 5

The 1997 FIS Ski Jumping Grand Prix was the 4th Summer Grand Prix season in ski jumping on plastic. The season began on 14 August 1997 in Courchevel, France and ended on 31 August 1997 in Stams, Austria.

Other competitive circuits this season included the World Cup and Continental Cup.

== Calendar ==
=== Men ===
Num	Season	Date	Place	Hill	Size	Winner	Second	Third	Yellow bib
13	1	14 August 1997	(France) Courchevel	Tremplin du Praz K120	LH	(Japan) Masahiko Harada	(Norway) Espen Bredesen	(Japan) Takanobu Okabe	(Japan) Masahiko Harada
14	2	17 August 1997	(Norway) Trondheim	Granåsen K120	LH	(Japan) Takanobu Okabe	(Finland) Ville Kantee	(Norway) Espen Bredesen	(Japan) Takanobu Okabe
15	3	24 August 1997	(Germany) Hinterzarten	Rothaus-Schanze K90	NH	(Japan) Masahiko Harada	(Austria) Martin Höllwarth	(Japan) Hideharu Miyahira	(Japan) Masahiko Harada
16	4	27 August 1997	(Italy) Predazzo	Trampolino dal Ben K120	LH	(Japan) Masahiko Harada	(France) Nicolas Dessum	(Norway) Sturle Holseter	(Japan) Masahiko Harada
17	5	31 August 1997	(Austria) Stams	Brunnentalschanze K105	NH	(Norway) Espen Bredesen	(Austria) Martin Höllwarth	(Austria) Stefan Horngacher	(Japan) Masahiko Harada

== Standings ==
=== Overall ===
Rank	after 5 events	Points
1	(Japan) Masahiko Harada	310
2	(Norway) Espen Bredesen	274
3	(Austria) Martin Höllwarth	246
4	(Japan) Takanobu Okabe	227
5	(Japan) Kazuyoshi Funaki	192

=== Nations Cup ===
Rank	after 5 events	Points
1	Japan	1060
2	Norway	706
3	Austria	541
4	Germany	377
5	Finland	323
