= Rafał Śliż =

Polish ski jumper

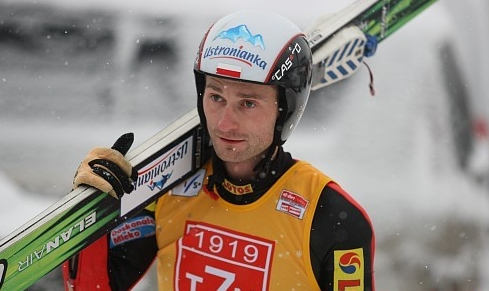

Personal information
- Born: 11 July 1983 (age 43) Wisła, Poland

Sport
- Sport: Skiing
- Club: KS Wisła Ustronianka

World Cup career
- Seasons: 2002-2014

Achievements and titles
- Personal bests: 199 m (Planica, 2010)
- Updated on June 19, 2026

Rafał Śliż (born 11 July 1983) is a Polish former ski jumper.

He made his Continental Cup debut in January 2004, his best result being a first place from Sapporo in January 2006 as well as two victories in Rovaniemi in December 2006. He also finished seventh in the large hill at the 2005 Winter Universiade.

He made his World Cup debut in January 2005 in Zakopane and collected his first World Cup points with a 26th place in January 2006 in Innsbruck. His best result is a thirteenth place in January 2009 in Zakopane. In 2009, he placed 8th as part of the Polish Men's Team Large Hill HS 145 World Cup in Germany.

After ending his athletic career in 2014, Śliż became a coach at clubs in Szczyrk and Wisła, including WSS Wisła.
