= Triberg Gallows =

Double gallows in Germany

Coordinates: 48°05′52″N 8°15′36.4″E

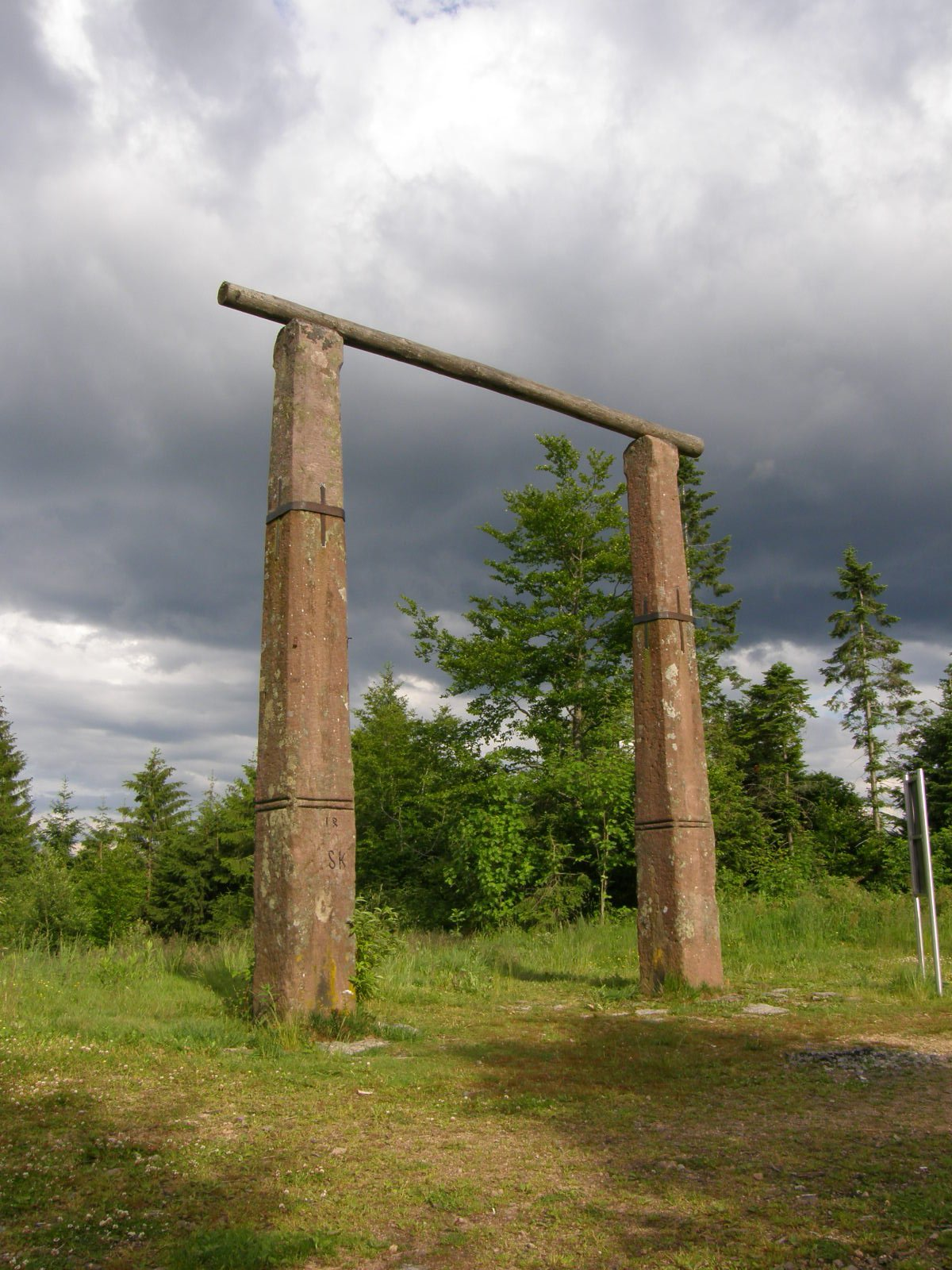
The Triberg Gallows

The Triberg Gallows (German: Triberger Galgen) is a double gallows on the heights known as Hochgericht (1,020.6 m above sea level (NHN)) on the K 5728 county road that runs from Schönwald to Villingen, and in the county of Schwarzwald-Baar-Kreis in the German state of Baden-Württemberg.

A map from Benedictine Abbey of St. George in the Black Forest indicates that, on the present site of the Blood Court, a gallows was erected in the late 16th century. A historical map known as the Pürschgerichtskarte, which charts the area around the free imperial town of Rottweil, shows two wooden gallows on this spot. The present stone gallows replaced its wooden predecessors in 1721. As a symbol of justice of the Anterior Austrian Obervogtei of Triberg, the execution site was visible for a long distance. By 1779, 15 executions are recorded, twelve of them for witchcraft.

The gallows consist of two sandstone pillars, reinforced with iron bands, and linked by a wooden crossbeam that was added later. The southeastern pillar bears the date 1721, the other one two initials, probably a mason's mark.

The Middle Way from Pforzheim to Waldshut runs by the gallows.

== Literature ==
- Michaela Hohkamp: Herrschaft in der Herrschaft. Die vorderösterreichische Obervogtei Triberg von 1737 bis 1780 (= publications of the Max Planck Institute for History, Vol. 142), Göttingen, 1998, ISBN 3-525-35457-6.
