= Elverum IL =

Norwegian sports club

- Full name: Elverum Idrettslag
- Founded: 1892

Elverum IL is a Norwegian alliance sports club from Elverum Municipality in Innlandet county. It was founded in 1892, and has sections for handball, association football, ski jumping, gymnastics and swimming.

== Other sports ==
Ski jumper Hein-Arne Mathiesen represented the club. The club was formerly active in athletics, where Bjørn Gundersen represented the club.
