= Hein-Arne Mathiesen =

Norwegian ski jumper

Personal information
- Born: 4 April 1971 (age 55)

Sport
- Sport: Skiing
- Club: Elverum IL

World Cup career
- Seasons: 1994, 1997
- Indiv. podiums: 0
- Indiv. wins: 0

Hein-Arne Mathiesen (born 4 April 1971) is a Norwegian retired ski jumper.

In the World Cup he finished once among the top 10, with a ninth place from Willingen in February 1997. He won the Continental Cup in the 1996/97 season.
