= Eirik Halvorsen =

Norwegian former ski jumper (born 1975)

Personal information
- Full name: Eirik Halvorsen
- Born: 15 August 1975 (age 50)

Sport
- Sport: Skiing
- Club: Konnerud IL

World Cup career
- Seasons: 1995–1996
- Indiv. podiums: 1 (+1 Team)
- Updated on 30 Mar 2015

Eirik Halvorsen (born 15 August 1975) is a Norwegian former ski jumper.
