= Knut Müller =

Norwegian ski jumper

Personal information
- Born: March 21, 1974 Norway

Sport
- Sport: Skiing
- Club: Asker SK

World Cup career
- Seasons: 1991–1995

Knut Müller (born 21 March 1974) is a Norwegian ski jumper.

He made his FIS Ski Jumping World Cup debut in January 1991 in Oberhof. He collected his first World Cup points at the Holmenkollen Ski Festival in March 1991 with a 26th place, later adding a 23rd place in January 1992 and 24th in January 1993. His last World Cup outing came in January 1995 in Sapporo.

He represented the sports club Asker SK.
