= Christian Reinthaler =

Austrian ski jumper (born 1974)

Personal information
- Full name: Christian Reinthaler

Sport
- Sport: Skiing

World Cup career
- Seasons: 1993; 1996
- Updated on 30 March 2015

Christian Reinthaler (born 14 May 1974) is an Austrian former ski jumper.
