= KS Wisła =

Polish sports club

KS Wisła is a Polish sports club from Wisła, Silesian Voivodeship founded on 15 April 1953. It has at times been sponsored and been named after the Ustronianka brand.

It is known for ski jumping and is the club of Adam Małysz, Wojciech Tajner, Tomisław Tajner, Rafał Śliż, Tomasz Byrt, Aleksander Zniszczoł, and Paweł Wąsek.
