= Geir Atle Wøien =

Norwegian ski jumper

Personal information
- Born: 26 September 1975 (age 50)

Sport
- Sport: Skiing
- Club: Trøgstad SK

World Cup career
- Seasons: 1993-1994
- Indiv. podiums: 0
- Indiv. wins: 0
- Updated on 3 January 2009

Geir Atle Wøien (born 26 September 1975) is a Norwegian retired ski jumper.

In the World Cup he finished once among the top 10, with an eighth place from Predazzo in December 1993.
