= Stian Kvarstad =

Norwegian ski jumper (born 1973)

Personal information
- Born: 25 January 1973 (age 53)

Sport
- Sport: Skiing
- Club: Hamarkameratene

World Cup career
- Seasons: 1993-1998
- Indiv. podiums: 0
- Indiv. wins: 0
- Updated on 3 January 2009

Stian Kvarstad (born 25 January 1973) is a Norwegian retired ski jumper.

In the World Cup he finished once among the top 10, with a seventh place from Vikersund in February 1998.
