= 1995–96 FIS Ski Jumping World Cup =

Ski jumping championship season

1995–96 World Cup
Winners
- Overall: (Austria) Andreas Goldberger
- Ski Jumping (NH, LH): (Finland) Ari-Pekka Nikkola
- Ski Flying: (Austria) Andreas Goldberger
- Four Hills Tournament: (Germany) Jens Weißflog
- Nations Cup: Finland

Competitions
- Venues: 21
- Individual: 28
- Team: 4
- Cancelled: 2

The 1995–96 FIS Ski Jumping World Cup was the 17th World Cup season in ski jumping and the 6th official World Cup season in ski flying with the sixth small crystal globe awarded.

The season began in Lillehammer, Norway on 2 December 1995 and finished in Oslo, Norway on 16 March 1996. The individual World Cup overall winner was Andreas Goldberger (third and last time in his career), his second Ski Flying small crystal globe and last of his 20 World Cup wins; the Nations Cup was taken by the Team of Finland.

28 men's individual events on 20 different venues in 14 countries were held on three different continents (Europe, Asia and North America); two individual events were cancelled due to bad weather conditions in Trondheim and Harrachov (on both occasions cancelled in first round due to strong wind). Also four men's team event was held.

Peaks of the season were FIS Ski Flying World Championships (which also counted for World Cup for the third Championship in a row) and Four Hills Tournament.

For the 2nd season in a row Ski Jumping small crystal globe was awarded (NH and LH events).

== Map of world cup hosts ==
Europe
Germany	Austria United States	Asia

== Calendar ==
=== Men's Individual ===
N – normal hill / L – large hill / F – flying hill
All	No.	Date	Place (Hill)	Size	Winner	Second	Third	Overall leader	R.
354	1	2 December 1995	(Norway) Lillehammer (Lysgårdsbakken K90, K120)	N _{120}	(Finland) Mika Laitinen	(Finland) Ari-Pekka Nikkola	(Japan) Masahiko Harada	(Finland) Mika Laitinen	
355	2	3 December 1995	(Norway) Lillehammer (Lysgårdsbakken K90, K120)	L _{205}	(Finland) Janne Ahonen	(Japan) Jinya Nishikata	(Finland) Ari-Pekka Nikkola	(Finland) Janne Ahonen	
356	3	8 December 1995	(Austria) Villach (Villacher Alpenarena K90)	N _{121}	(Japan) Masahiko Harada	(Finland) Mika Laitinen	(Finland) Ari-Pekka Nikkola	(Finland) Janne Ahonen (Finland) Ari-Pekka Nikkola	
357	4	10 December 1995	(Slovenia) Planica (Bloudkova velikanka K120)	L _{206}	(Finland) Mika Laitinen	(Norway) Roar Ljøkelsøy	(Finland) Janne Ahonen	(Finland) Mika Laitinen	
358	5	12 December 1995	(Italy) Predazzo (Trampolino dal Ben K90)	N _{122}	(Finland) Mika Laitinen	(Finland) Ari-Pekka Nikkola	(Austria) Andreas Goldberger	(Finland) Mika Laitinen	
359	6	16 December 1995	(France) Chamonix (Le Mont K95)	N _{123}	(Finland) Ari-Pekka Nikkola	(Finland) Janne Ahonen	(Germany) Ralph Gebstedt	(Finland) Mika Laitinen	
360	7	17 December 1995	(France) Chamonix (Le Mont K95)	N _{124}	(Japan) Hiroya Saito	(Finland) Ari-Pekka Nikkola	(Japan) Masahiko Harada	(Finland) Ari-Pekka Nikkola	
361	8	28 December 1995	(Germany) Oberhof (Hans-Renner-Schanze K120)	L _{207}	(Finland) Mika Laitinen	(Finland) Ari-Pekka Nikkola	(Germany) Jens Weißflog	(Finland) Mika Laitinen	
362	9	30 December 1995	(Germany) Oberstdorf (Schattenbergschanze K115)	L _{208}	(Finland) Mika Laitinen	(Germany) Jens Weißflog	(Japan) Masahiko Harada	(Finland) Mika Laitinen	
363	10	1 January 1996	(Germany) Garmisch-Pa (Große Olympiaschanze K107)	L _{209}	(Austria) R. Schwarzenberger	(Norway) Espen Bredesen	(Germany) Jens Weißflog	(Finland) Mika Laitinen	
364	11	4 January 1996	(Austria) Innsbruck (Bergiselschanze K110)	L _{210}	(Austria) Andreas Goldberger	(Germany) Jens Weißflog	(Japan) Hiroya Saito	(Finland) Ari-Pekka Nikkola	
365	12	6 January 1996	(Austria) Bischofshofen (Paul-Ausserleitner K120)	L _{211}	(Germany) Jens Weißflog	(Norway) Espen Bredesen	(Finland) Ari-Pekka Nikkola	(Finland) Ari-Pekka Nikkola	
44th Four Hills Tournament Overall (30 December 1995 – 6 January 1996)					(Germany) Jens Weißflog	(Finland) Ari-Pekka Nikkola	(Austria) R. Schwarzenberger	4H Tournament	
366	13	13 January 1996	(Switzerland) Engelberg (Gross-Titlis-Schanze K120)	L _{212}	(Finland) Jani Soininen	(Japan) Jinya Nishikata	(Austria) Andreas Goldberger	(Finland) Ari-Pekka Nikkola	
367	14	14 January 1996	(Switzerland) Engelberg (Gross-Titlis-Schanze K120)	L _{213}	(Austria) Andreas Goldberger	(Austria) R. Schwarzenberger	(Norway) Espen Bredesen	(Finland) Ari-Pekka Nikkola	
368	15	20 January 1996	(Japan) Sapporo (Miyanomori K90) (Ōkurayama K115)	N _{125}	(Germany) Jens Weißflog	(Norway) Eirik Halvorsen	(Austria) R. Schwarzenberger	(Finland) Ari-Pekka Nikkola	
369	16	21 January 1996	(Japan) Sapporo (Miyanomori K90) (Ōkurayama K115)	L _{214}	(Finland) Ari-Pekka Nikkola (Austria) Andreas Goldberger		(Japan) Hiroya Saito	(Finland) Ari-Pekka Nikkola	
370	17	27 January 1996	(Poland) Zakopane (Wielka Krokiew K116)	L _{215}	(Slovenia) Primož Peterka	(Austria) Andreas Goldberger	(Austria) R. Schwarzenberger	(Finland) Ari-Pekka Nikkola	
371	18	28 January 1996	(Poland) Zakopane (Wielka Krokiew K116)	L _{216}	(Austria) Andreas Goldberger	(Slovenia) Primož Peterka	(Finland) Ari-Pekka Nikkola	(Finland) Ari-Pekka Nikkola	
FIS World Cup 1995/96 = FIS Ski Flying World Championships 1996 (10 – 11 February • Bad Mitterndorf)
372	19	10 February 1996	(Austria) Bad Mitterndorf (Kulm K185)	F _{031}	(Finland) Janne Ahonen	(Austria) Andreas Goldberger	(Finland) Ari-Pekka Nikkola	(Finland) Ari-Pekka Nikkola	
373	20	11 February 1996	(Austria) Bad Mitterndorf (Kulm K185)	F _{032}	(Austria) Andreas Goldberger	(Germany) Christof Duffner	(Finland) Janne Ahonen	(Finland) Ari-Pekka Nikkola	
374	21	17 February 1996	(United States) Iron Mountain (Pine Mountain K120)	L _{217}	(Germany) Jens Weißflog	(Austria) Andreas Widhölzl	(Finland) Ari-Pekka Nikkola	(Finland) Ari-Pekka Nikkola	
375	22	18 February 1996	(United States) Iron Mountain (Pine Mountain K120)	L _{218}	(Japan) Masahiko Harada	(Poland) Adam Małysz	(Finland) Kimmo Savolainen	(Finland) Ari-Pekka Nikkola	
		24 February 1996	(Norway) Trondheim (Granåsen K120)	L _{cnx}	cancelled due to strong wind after longer break in first round			—	
376	23	28 February 1996	(Finland) Kuopio (Puijo K90)	N _{126}	(Finland) Kimmo Savolainen	(Czech Republic) Jaroslav Sakala	(Finland) Janne Väätäinen	(Finland) Ari-Pekka Nikkola	
377	24	1 March 1996	(Finland) Lahti (Salpausselkä K90, K114)	N _{127}	(Japan) Masahiko Harada	(Finland) Mika Laitinen	(Poland) Adam Małysz (Slovenia) Primož Peterka	(Finland) Ari-Pekka Nikkola	
378	25	3 March 1996	(Finland) Lahti (Salpausselkä K90, K114)	L _{219}	(Japan) Masahiko Harada	(Slovenia) Primož Peterka	(Finland) Jani Soininen	(Finland) Ari-Pekka Nikkola	
379	26	9 March 1996	(Czech Republic) Harrachov (Čerťák K180)	F _{033}	(Austria) Andreas Goldberger	(Germany) Christof Duffner	(Czech Republic) Jaroslav Sakala	(Austria) Andreas Goldberger	
		10 March 1996	(Czech Republic) Harrachov (Čerťák K180)	F _{cnx}	cancelled after only two jumps in first round due to strong wind			—	
380	27	13 March 1996	(Sweden) Falun (Lugnet K90)	N _{128}	(Slovenia) Primož Peterka	(Poland) Adam Małysz	(Germany) Jens Weißflog	(Austria) Andreas Goldberger	
381	28	17 March 1996	(Norway) Oslo (Holmenkollbakken K110)	L _{220}	(Poland) Adam Małysz	(Finland) Janne Ahonen	(Japan) Masahiko Harada	(Austria) Andreas Goldberger	
17th FIS World Cup Overall (2 December 1995 – 17 March 1996)					(Austria) Andreas Goldberger	(Finland) Ari-Pekka Nikkola	(Finland) Janne Ahonen	World Cup Overall	

=== Men's Team ===
All	No.	Date	Place (Hill)	Size	Winner	Second	Third	R.
8	1	9 December 1995	(Slovenia) Planica (Bloudkova velikanka K120)	L _{008}	Finland Jani Soininen; Mika Laitinen; Ari-Pekka Nikkola; Janne Ahonen	Japan Jinya Nishikata; Kenji Suda; Hiroya Saito; Masahiko Harada	Norway Espen Bredesen; Eirik Halvorsen; Roar Ljøkelsøy; Lasse Ottesen	
9	2	23 February 1996	(Norway) Trondheim (Granåsen K120)	L _{009}	Finland Ari-Pekka Nikkola; Jani Soininen; Janne Ahonen; Mika Laitinen	Japan Takanobu Okabe; Jun Shibuya; Masahiko Harada; Hiroya Saito	Germany Gerd Siegmund; Christof Duffner; Dieter Thoma; Jens Weißflog	
10	3	2 March 1996	(Finland) Lahti (Salpausselkä K114)	L _{010}	Japan Takanobu Okabe; Jinya Nishikata; Masahiko Harada; Hiroya Saito	Germany Ralph Gebstedt; Christof Duffner; Dieter Thoma; Jens Weißflog	Austria Martin Höllwarth; Reinhard Schwarzenberger; Stefan Horngacher; Andreas Goldberger	
11	4	15 March 1996	(Norway) Oslo (Holmenkollbakken K110)	L _{011}	Austria Martin Höllwarth; Reinhard Schwarzenberger; Andreas Widhölzl; Andreas Goldberger	Norway Paal Hansen; Sturle Holseter; Espen Bredesen; Roar Ljøkelsøy	Germany Gerd Siegmund; Michael Uhrmann; Christof Duffner; Jens Weißflog	

== Standings ==
=== Overall ===
Rank	after 28 events	Points
1	(Austria) Andreas Goldberger	1416
2	(Finland) Ari-Pekka Nikkola	1384
3	(Finland) Janne Ahonen	1054
4	(Germany) Jens Weißflog	1028
5	(Japan) Masahiko Harada	982
6	(Finland) Mika Laitinen	914
7	(Poland) Adam Małysz	751
8	(Japan) Hiroya Saito	747
9	(Austria) R. Schwarzenberger	724
10	(Slovenia) Primož Peterka	670

=== Ski Jumping (JP) Cup ===
Rank	after 25 events	Points
1	(Finland) Ari-Pekka Nikkola	1288
2	(Austria) Andreas Goldberger	1136
3	(Japan) Masahiko Harada	982
4	(Germany) Jens Weißflog	938
5	(Finland) Janne Ahonen	868
6	(Finland) Mika Laitinen	864
7	(Japan) Hiroya Saito	723
8	(Poland) Adam Małysz	706
9	(Slovenia) Primož Peterka	670
10	(Austria) R. Schwarzenberger	649

=== Ski Flying ===
Rank	after 3 events	Points
1	(Austria) Andreas Goldberger	280
2	(Finland) Janne Ahonen	186
3	(Germany) Christof Duffner	176
4	(Slovenia) Urban Franc	132
5	(Finland) Ari-Pekka Nikkola	96
	(Czech Republic) Jaroslav Sakala	96
7	(Norway) Roar Ljøkelsøy	93
8	(Germany) Jens Weißflog	90
9	(Austria) R. Schwarzenberger	75
10	(Norway) Espen Bredesen	72

=== Nations Cup ===
Rank	after 32 events	Points
1	Finland	5079
2	Japan	4162
3	Austria	3464
4	Germany	2919
5	Norway	2739
6	Slovenia	1311
7	Switzerland	1060
8	Czech Republic	851
9	Poland	832
10	France	579

=== Four Hills Tournament ===
Rank	after 4 events	Points
1	(Germany) Jens Weißflog	952.3
2	(Finland) Ari-Pekka Nikkola	909.7
3	(Austria) R. Schwarzenberger	882.1
4	(Japan) Hiroya Saito	881.9
5	(Germany) Christof Duffner	872.9
6	(Finland) Janne Ahonen	869.1
7	(Austria) Andreas Goldberger	859.6
8	(Japan) Jinya Nishikata	845.2
9	(Finland) Jani Soininen	841.1
10	(Japan) Noriaki Kasai	838.9

== See also ==
- 1995 Grand Prix (top level summer series)
- 1995–96 FIS Continental Cup (2nd level competition)
