= Michael Kury =

Austrian ski jumper (born 1978)

Personal information
- Born: 30 August 1978 (age 48)

Sport
- Sport: Skiing

World Cup career
- Seasons: 1995-1998
- Indiv. wins: 0
- Updated on 23 December 2007

Michael Kury (born 30 August 1978) is a retired Austrian ski jumper.

In the World Cup he finished thrice among the top 30, his best result being a 24th place from Garmisch-Partenkirchen in the Four Hills Tournament in January 1996.

He finished second overall in the 1995-1996 Continental Cup.
