= Stein Henrik Tuff =

Norwegian former ski jumper (born 1974)

Personal information
- Born: 16 September 1974 (age 52)

Sport
- Sport: Skiing
- Club: Selsbakk IF

World Cup career
- Seasons: 1994–96
- Indiv. podiums: 0
- Indiv. wins: 0
- Updated on 2 December 2008

Stein Henrik Tuff (born 16 September 1974) is a Norwegian former ski jumper.

In the World Cup he finished once among the top 10, with a tenth place from Kuopio in February 1996. He won the Continental Cup in the 1995/96 season.

He participated in the 1994 Winter Olympics in Lillehammer, where he finished 43rd in the large hill.
