= Naoki Yasuzaki =

Japanese former ski jumper (born 1969)

Medal record

Men's ski jumping

World Championships
| Bronze medal – third place | 1995 Thunder Bay | Team large hill |

Naoki Yasuzaki (安崎 直幹, Yasuzaki Naoki; born August 1, 1969) is a Japanese former ski jumper who competed from 1990 to 2003. He won a bronze medal in the team large hill competition at the 1995 FIS Nordic World Ski Championships in Thunder Bay, Ontario and finished 22nd in the individual large hill event at those same championships.

Yasuzaki best finish at the Ski-flying World Championships was 31st in 1994. His best individual career at Worldcup finish was 4th (1993 in Lahti).
