= Karl-Heinz Dorner =

Austrian ski jumper (born 1979)

Personal information
- Born: 25 October 1979 (age 46)

Sport
- Sport: Skiing
- Club: WSV Andelsbuch

World Cup career
- Seasons: 1995, 1998-2001
- Indiv. wins: 0
- Updated on 23 December 2007

Karl-Heinz Dorner (born 25 October 1979) is a retired Austrian ski jumper.

In the World Cup he finished twice among the top 30, his best result being a 21st place from Oberhof in December 1995.
