= Wilhelm Brenna =

Norwegian ski jumper

Personal information
- Born: 8 October 1979 (age 47)

Sport
- Sport: Skiing
- Club: Magnor UL

World Cup career
- Seasons: 1997-2000
- Indiv. podiums: 0
- Indiv. wins: 0
- Updated on 2 December 2008

Wilhelm Brenna (born 8 October 1979) is a retired Norwegian ski jumper.

In the World Cup he finished once among the top 15, with a thirteenth place from Kuopio in March 1997. He became world junior champion in the normal hill the same year. He finished third overall in the Continental Cup in the 1998/99 season.
