= Rico Meinel =

German ski jumper (born 1974)

Personal information
- Born: 3 April 1974 (age 52)

Sport
- Sport: Skiing
- Club: WSV Aschb.Muehlleiten

World Cup career
- Seasons: 1992-1997
- Indiv. podiums: 0
- Indiv. wins: 0
- Updated on 23 December 2007

Rico Meinel (born 3 April 1974) is a retired German ski jumper.

In the World Cup he finished once among the top 10, his best result being a fifth place from Innsbruck in the Four Hills Tournament in January 1995.
