= Falko Krismayr =

Austrian ski jumper

Sport
- Sport: Skiing

World Cup career
- Seasons: 1997-1999
- Indiv. wins: 0
- Updated on 23 December 2007

Falko Krismayr is a retired Austrian ski jumper.

In the World Cup he finished twice among the top 30, his best result being a 23rd place from Vikersund in February 1998.

He has a bronze medal from the 1997 World Junior Championships. He finished second overall in the 1997-1998 Continental Cup.
