= Jakub Jiroutek =

Czech ski jumper (born 1977)

Jakub Jiroutek (born 1977) is a retired Czech ski jumper.

He made his World Cup debut in January 1994 in Liberec, also collecting his first World Cup points with a 26th place. Thriving in sky flying hills, he improved to 18th in February 1996 in Kulm and 5th in March 1998 in Vikersund. Jiroutek finished 21st at the 1996 Ski Flying World Championships, 33rd at the 2000 Ski Flying World Championships and 27th at the 2002 Ski Flying World Championships, as well as 50th–51st at the 1999 World Championships.

His last individual World Cup outing was a 27th place in January 2002 in Sapporo, and his last overall World Cup outing the team event in March 2002 in Planica. He competed on the Continental Cup from 2001 to 2003 and managed one podium here, a third place in February 2002 in Braunlage.

He represented the club Dukla Liberec.
