= Jérôme Gay =

French ski jumper

Personal information
- Nationality: French
- Born: 9 February 1975 (age 50); Cluses, France

Sport
- Sport: Ski jumping

Jérôme Gay (born 9 February 1975) is a French ski jumper. He competed at the 1992 Winter Olympics and the 1998 Winter Olympics.
