= Kimmo Savolainen =

Finnish ski jumper

Personal information
- Nationality: Finland
- Born: 2 August 1974 (age 51) Siilinjärvi, Finland

Sport
- Sport: Skiing

World Cup career
- Seasons: 1994–1998
- Indiv. starts: 51
- Indiv. podiums: 2
- Indiv. wins: 1
- Team starts: 1
- Updated on 10 February 2016

Kimmo Savolainen (born 2 August 1974) is a Finnish former ski jumper.

== World Cup ==
=== Standings ===
Season	Overall	4H	SF	NT	JP
1993/94	68	—	—	N/A	N/A
1994/95	67	—	—	N/A	N/A
1995/96	21	29	38	N/A	19
1996/97	45	29	—	40	42
1997/98	19	25	25	49	19

=== Wins ===
No.	Season	Date	Location	Hill	Size
1	1995/96	28 February 1996	(Finland) Kuopio	Puijo K90 (night)	NH
