= Schönwald im Schwarzwald =

- Municipality
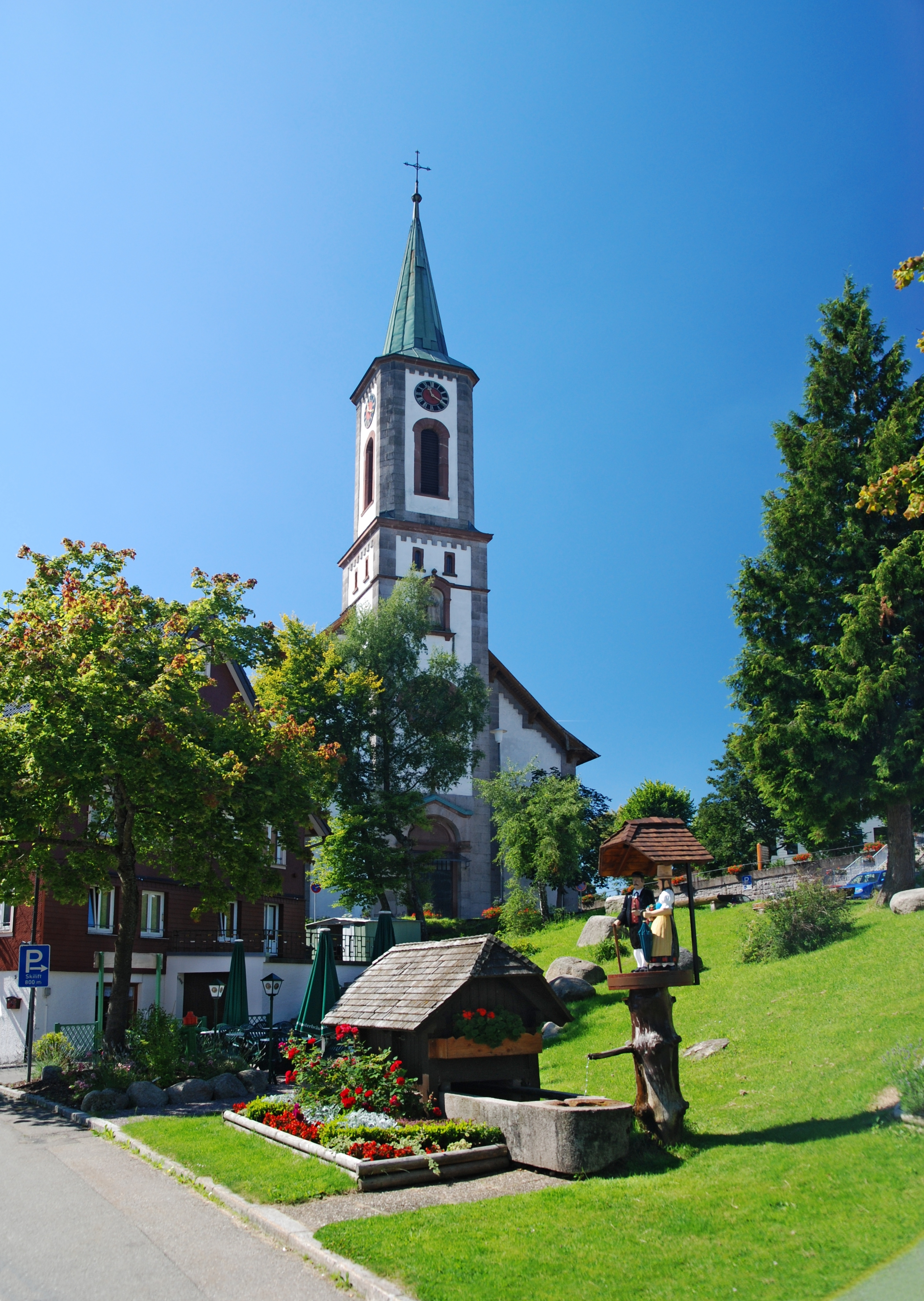
- Church of Saint Anthony

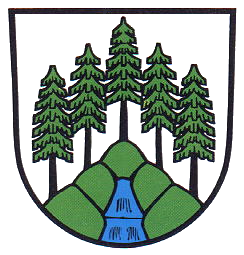
- Coat of arms

- Location of Schönwald im Schwarzwald within Schwarzwald-Baar-Kreis district
- Interactive map of Schönwald im Schwarzwald
- Location within Germany Location within Baden-Württemberg
- Coordinates: 48°06′17″N 08°12′10″E
- Country: Germany
- State: Baden-Württemberg
- Admin. region: Freiburg
- District: Schwarzwald-Baar-Kreis

Government
  - Mayor (2020–28): Christian Wörpel

Area
  - Total: 27.8 km^{2} (10.7 sq mi)
- Elevation: 1,000 m (3,300 ft)

Population (2025-12-31)
  - Total: 2,551
  - Density: 91.8/km^{2} (238/sq mi)
- Time zone: UTC+01:00 (CET)
  - Summer (DST): UTC+02:00 (CEST)
- Postal codes: 78141
- Dialling codes: 07722
- Vehicle registration: VS
- Website: schoenwald.net

Schönwald im Schwarzwald (German pronunciation: [ˈʃøːnvalt ʔɪm ˈʃvaʁtsvalt], lit. 'Schönwald in the Black Forest') is a municipality in the state of Baden-Württemberg in the Black Forest in southwest Germany, near the France–Germany border and Germany–Switzerland border.

== Notable people ==
It is the birthplace of Franz Ketterer, a clockmaker who was one of several possible inventors of the cuckoo clock.

== Sights ==
- Triberg Gallows
