= Frode Håre =

Norwegian ski jumper

Personal information
- Born: 10 December 1972 (age 53)

Sport
- Sport: Skiing
- Club: Nedre Sigdal IL

World Cup career
- Seasons: 1993, 1995-2000
- Indiv. podiums: 0
- Indiv. wins: 0
- Updated on 2 December 2008

Frode Håre (born 10 December 1972) is a retired Norwegian ski jumper.

In the World Cup he finished once among the top 10, with a tenth place from Sapporo in January 1995.

After retiring he has been working as a ski jumping coach. He has coached Anders Jacobsen among others.
