= 2023–24 FIS Ski Flying World Cup =

| Discipline | Men | Women |
| Overall | (Austria) Daniel Huber | crystal globe not awarded |

Competition
| Edition | 27th | – |
| Locations | 3 | 1 |
| Individual | 6 | 1 |
| Team | 1 + 1 super team | – |
| Cancelled | – | 1 |

The 2023–24 FIS Ski Flying World Cup was the 27th official World Cup season in ski flying. The winner was awarded with small crystal globe as the subdiscipline of FIS Ski Jumping World Cup.

== Map of World Cup hosts ==
| (Germany) Oberstdorf | (Norway) Vikersund | (Slovenia) Planica |
|---|---|---|
| Heini-Klopfer | Vikersundbakken | Letalnica bratov Gorišek |
Europe

== World records ==
List of world record distances achieved within this World Cup season.

| Date | Athlete | Hill | Round | Place | Metres | Feet |
Women
| 17 March 2024 | (Norway) Silje Opseth | Vikersundbakken HS240 | Trial | Vikersund, Norway | 236.5 | 776 |
| 17 March 2024 | (Norway) Silje Opseth | Vikersundbakken HS240 | Final | Vikersund, Norway | 230.5 | 756 |

Longest women's jump in history, but invalid due to Opseth's crash upon landing.

== Calendar ==
=== Men's Individual ===
| All | No. | Date | Place (Hill) | Size | Winner | Second | Third | Ski flying leader | R. |
|---|---|---|---|---|---|---|---|---|---|
| 1108 | 1 | 24 February 2024 | (Germany) Oberstdorf (Heini-Klopfer HS235) | F _{141} | (Slovenia) Timi Zajc | (Slovenia) Peter Prevc | (Austria) Stefan Kraft | (Slovenia) Timi Zajc | |
| 1109 | 2 | 25 February 2024 | (Germany) Oberstdorf (Heini-Klopfer HS235) | F _{142} | (Austria) Stefan Kraft | (Slovenia) Peter Prevc | (Japan) Ryōyū Kobayashi | (Austria) Stefan Kraft | |
| prologue | | 15 March 2024 | (Norway) Vikersund (Vikersundbakken HS240) | F _{Qro} | (Slovenia) Peter Prevc | (Austria) Stefan Kraft | (Austria) Daniel Huber | — | |
| | | 16 March 2024 | (Norway) Vikersund (Vikersundbakken HS240) | F _{cnx} | cancelled due to bad weather and rescheduled on 16 March | | | — | |
| 1116 | 3 | (Note: Cancelled individual men's ski flying event in Vikersund (16 March) was rescheduled to 17 March due to strong wind (with only one round).)17 March 2024 | (Norway) Vikersund (Vikersundbakken HS240) | F _{143} | (Austria) Stefan Kraft | (Austria) Daniel Huber | (Slovenia) Domen Prevc | (Austria) Stefan Kraft | |
| 1117 | 4 | (Note: 2nd Individual men's ski flying event in Vikersund (17 March) had 3 rounds.)17 March 2024 | (Norway) Vikersund (Vikersundbakken HS240) | F _{144} | (Austria) Daniel Huber | (Austria) Stefan Kraft | (Slovenia) Timi Zajc | (Austria) Stefan Kraft | |
| qualifying | | 21 March 2024 | (Slovenia) Planica (Letalnica b. Gorišek HS240) | F _{Qro} | (Japan) Ryōyū Kobayashi | (Poland) Piotr Żyła | (Austria) Daniel Huber | — | |
| 1118 | 5 | 22 March 2024 | (Slovenia) Planica (Letalnica b. Gorišek HS240) | F _{145} | (Slovenia) Peter Prevc | (Austria) Daniel Huber | (Norway) J. André Forfang | (Austria) Stefan Kraft | |
| team | | 23 March 2024 | (Slovenia) Planica (Letalnica b. Gorišek HS240) | F _{T} | (Austria) Daniel Huber | (Japan) Ryōyū Kobayashi | (Slovenia) Peter Prevc | — | |
| 1119 | 6 | 24 March 2024 | (Slovenia) Planica (Letalnica b. Gorišek HS240) | F _{146} | (Austria) Daniel Huber | (Slovenia) Domen Prevc | (Poland) Aleksander Zniszczoł | (Austria) Daniel Huber | |
| 6th Planica7 Overall (21 – 24 March 2024) | | | | | (Austria) Daniel Huber | (Slovenia) Peter Prevc | (Norway) J. André Forfang | Planica7 | |
| 27th FIS Ski Flying Men's Overall (24 February – 24 March 2024) | | | | | (Austria) Daniel Huber | (Austria) Stefan Kraft | (Slovenia) Peter Prevc | Ski Flying Overall | |

=== Women's Individual ===
| All | No. | Date | Place (Hill) | Size | Winner | Second | Third | Overall leader | R. |
|---|---|---|---|---|---|---|---|---|---|
| | | 16 March 2024 | (Norway) Vikersund (Vikersundbakken HS240) | F _{cnx} | cancelled due to strong wind | | | — | |
| 232 | 1 | 17 March 2024 | (Norway) Vikersund (Vikersundbakken HS240) | F _{001} | (Norway) Eirin Maria Kvandal | (Norway) Silje Opseth | (Slovenia) Ema Klinec | no leader | |

=== Men's team ===
| All | No. | Date | Place (Hill) | Size | Winner | Second | Third | R. |
Men's super team
| 5 | 1 | (Note: Men's super team event in Oberstdorf (23 February) had 2 instead of 3 rounds due to organisational changes.)23 February 2024 | (Germany) Oberstdorf (Heini-Klopfer HS235) | F _{001} | Slovenia Timi Zajc; Domen Prevc | Norway Kristoffer Eriksen Sundal; Johann André Forfang | Austria Michael Hayböck; Stefan Kraft | |
Men's team
| 122 | 1 | (Note: Men's team event in Planica (23 March) had only one round due to strong wind.)23 March 2024 | (Slovenia) Planica (Letalnica b. Gorišek HS240) | F _{027} | Austria Daniel Tschofenig; Michael Hayböck; Stefan Kraft; Daniel Huber | Slovenia Lovro Kos; Domen Prevc; Timi Zajc; Peter Prevc | Norway Robert Johansson; Benjamin Østvold; Marius Lindvik; Johann André Forfang | |

Raw Air 2024 (part of)
Planica7 (2024) (part of)

== Standings ==
=== Ski Flying ===
| Rank | after 6 events | Points |
|---|---|---|
| | (Austria) Daniel Huber | 429 |
| 2 | (Austria) Stefan Kraft | 426 |
| 3 | (Slovenia) Peter Prevc | 382 |
| 4 | (Slovenia) Timi Zajc | 296 |
| 5 | (Slovenia) Domen Prevc | 270 |
| 6 | (Japan) Ryōyū Kobayashi | 189 |
| 7 | (Germany) Andreas Wellinger | 174 |
| 8 | (Norway) Johann André Forfang | 172 |
| 9 | (Poland) Aleksander Zniszczoł | 160 |
| 10 | (Austria) Michael Hayböck | 157 |
