= FIS Ski Flying World Cup =

Annual ski flying competition since 1980

Ski Flying World Cup
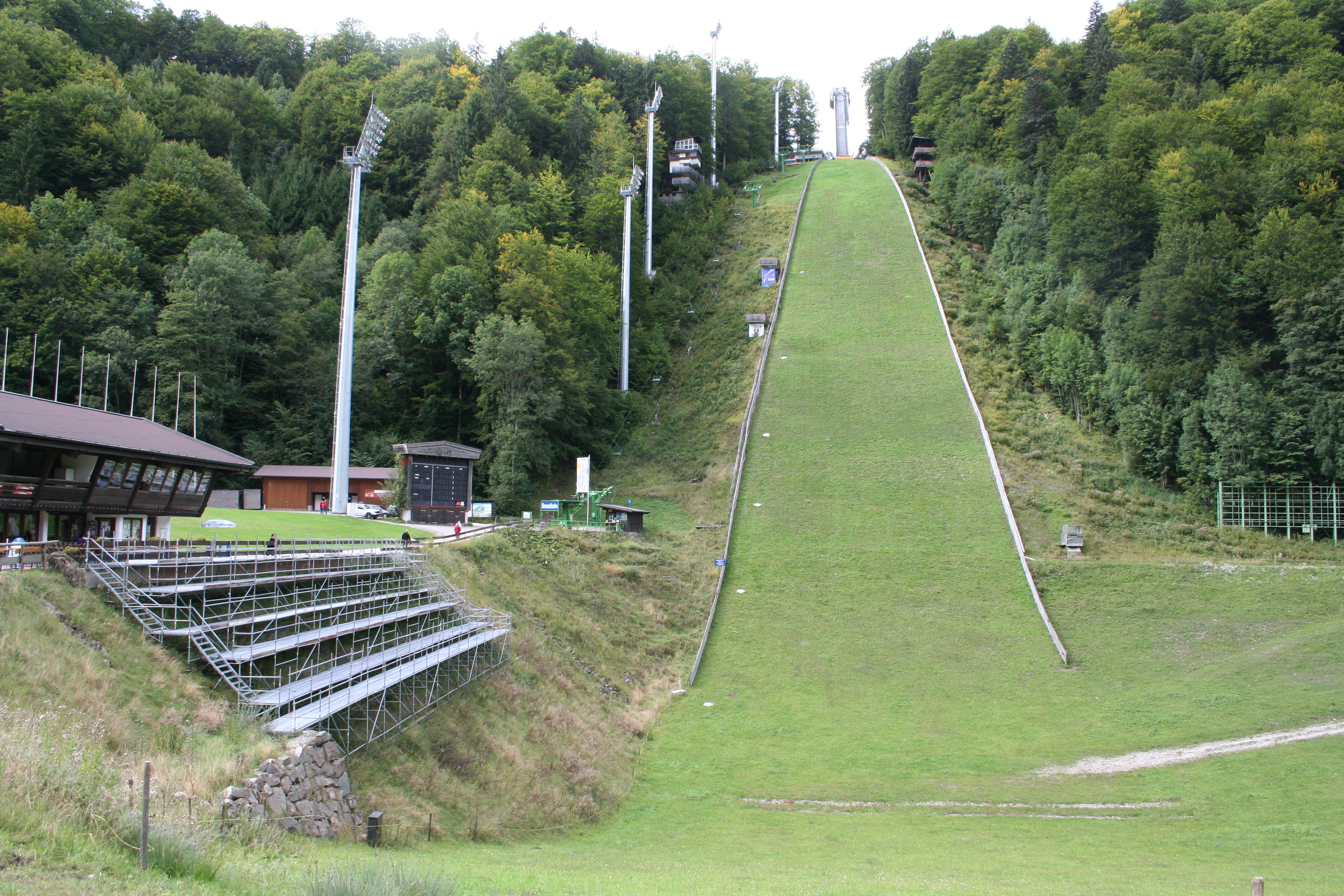
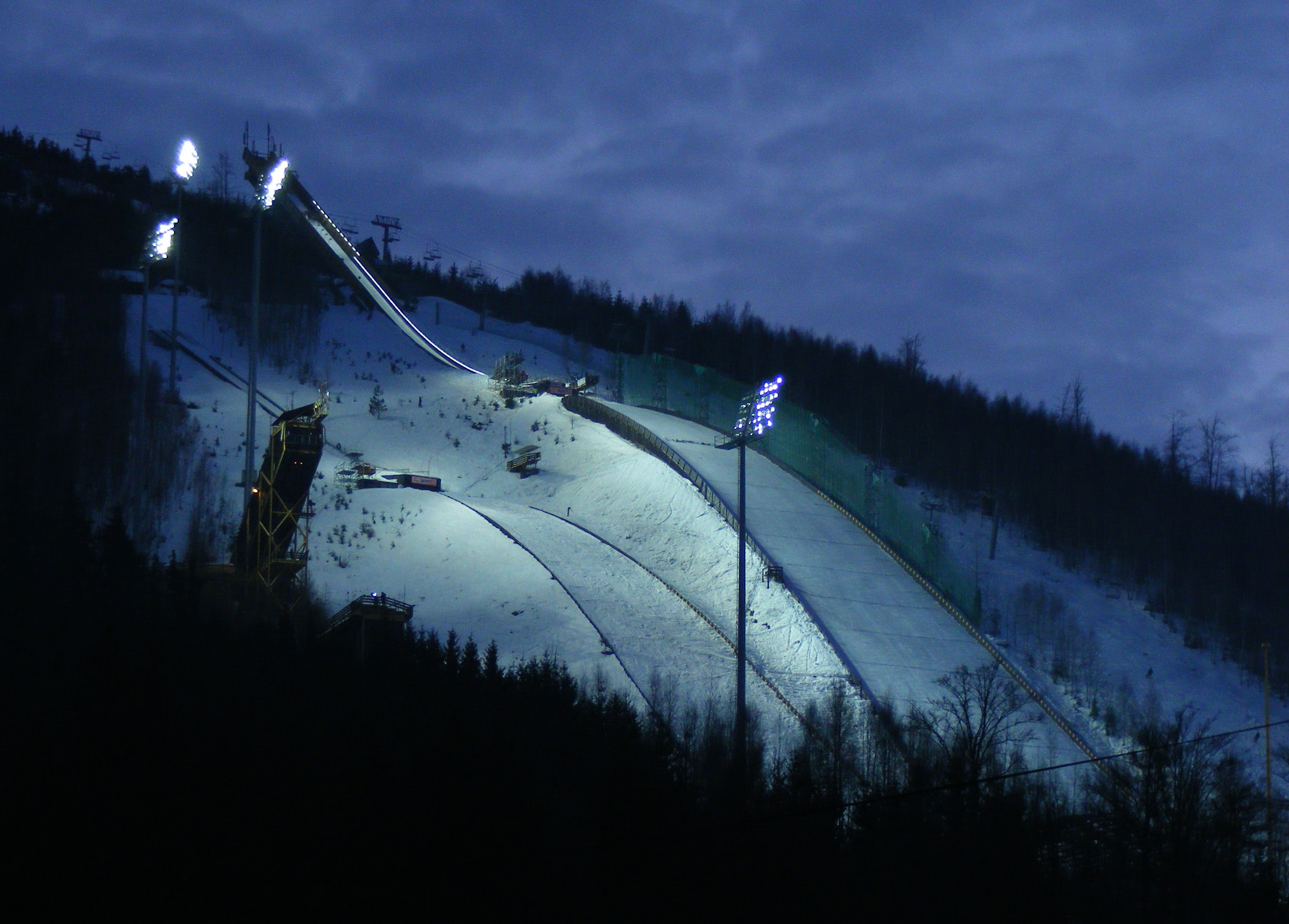
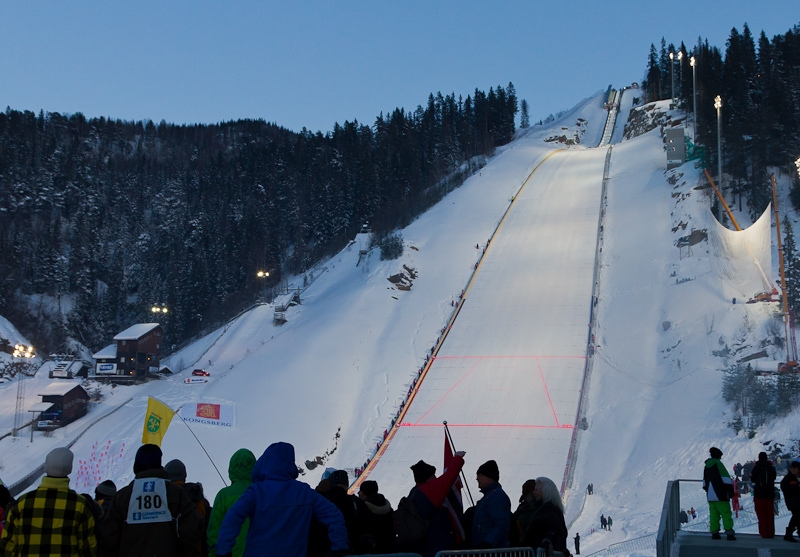
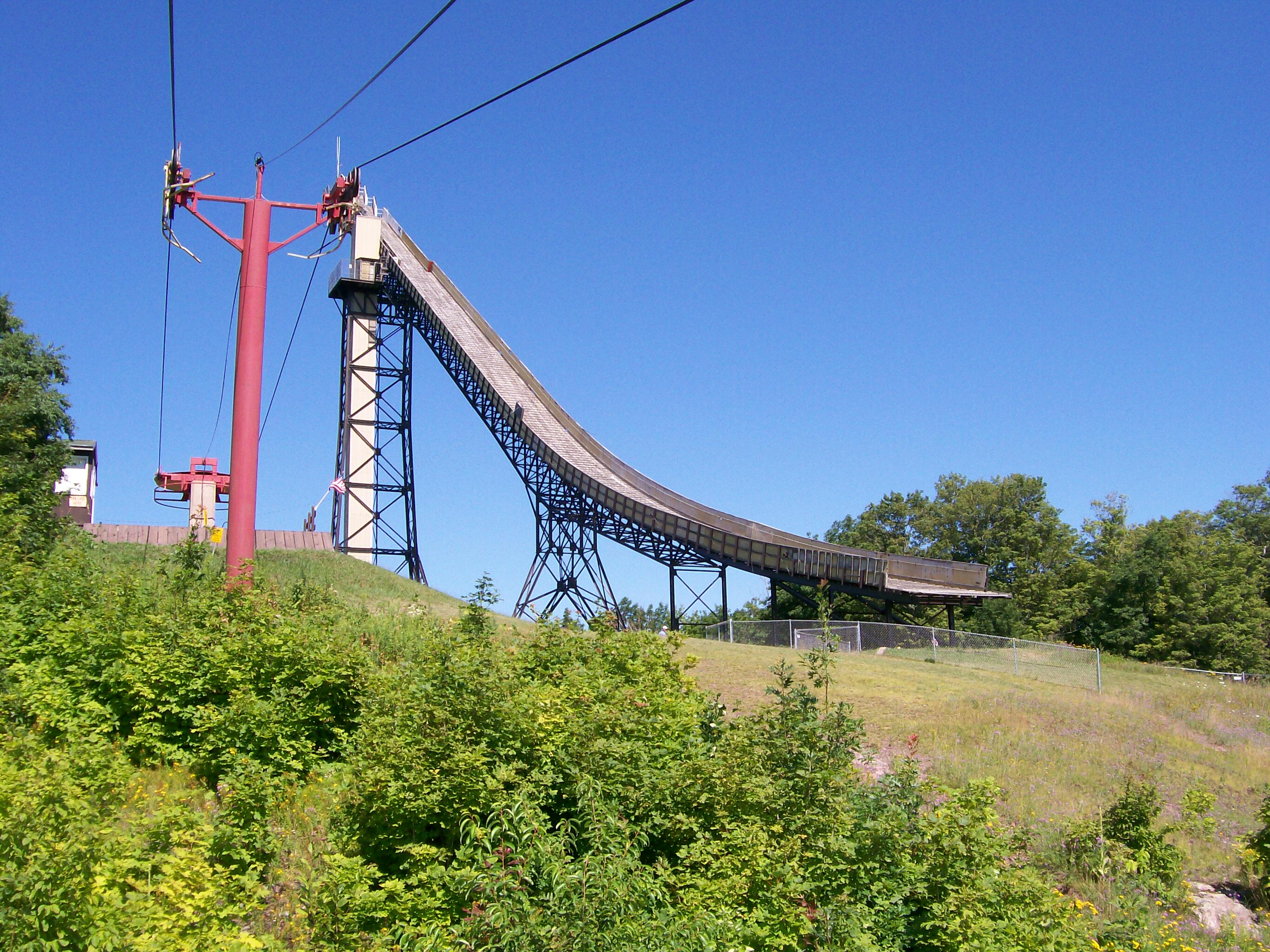
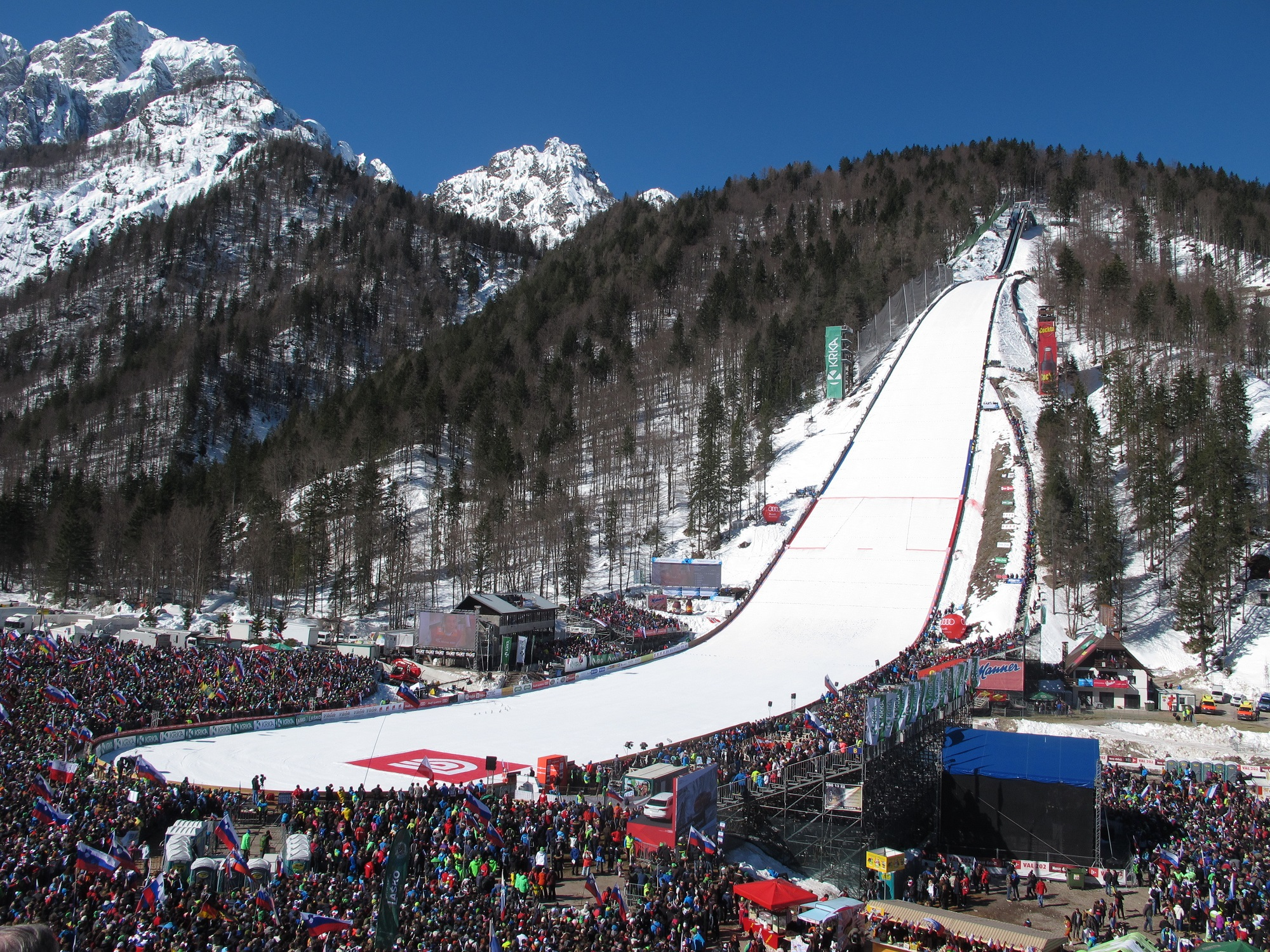
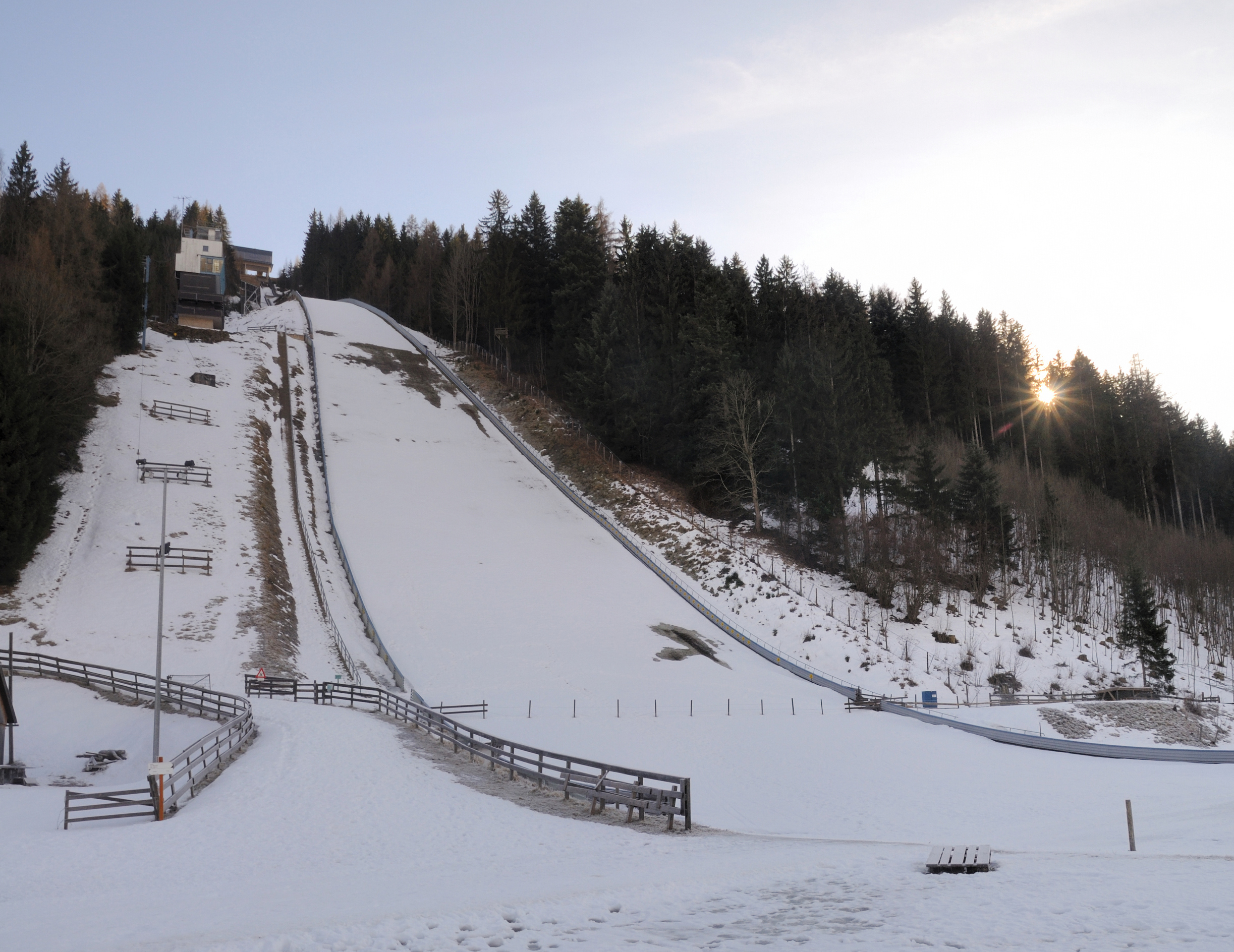
- Genre: 1936 – birthplace in Planica; 1972 – World Championships; 1980 – World Cup premiere
- Locations: Planica; Oberstdorf; Vikersund; Kulm; Harrachov; Ironwood
- Inaugurated: 29 February 1980 (individual); 18 March 2000 (team); Officially awarded seasons: 1991–2001 (1st leg); 2009–present (2nd leg)
- Most recent: 2021–22 FIS Ski Flying World Cup
- Organiser: International Ski Federation

The FIS Ski Flying World Cup is an annual competition in ski flying, contested as part of the FIS Ski Jumping World Cup and organized by International Ski Federation. It should not be confused with the FIS Ski Flying World Championships, which are a separate one-off event contested biennially during the World Cup season, but with points not counting towards it.

Four World Championships in ski flying organized in 1992, 1994, 1996 and 1998 also counted for World Cup points.

From 1979/80 until 1989/90 ski flying world cup events were organized as K.O.P. Ski Flying Week Tournaments and were not awarded with trophies but counted in overall ranking. Ski Flying World Cup was first time officially organized from 1990/91 until 2000/01 and after eight years break again since 2008/09 have been awarded with small crystal globe. Only forty competitors can enter the competition.

First individual event organized in 1980 is the only world cup event in history where single event took three days in total. First team event in history was organized in 2000 in Planica.

There are six ski flying hills that exists in the world: Planica, Oberstdorf, Vikersund, Kulm, Harrachov and Ironwood. They are joined in the »K.O.P.« (Kulm-Oberstdorf-Planica) ski flying hills association founded in 1962 in Ljubljana. The only hill located outside of Europe is Ironwood which is expected to be reopened and covered with plastic mate in 2017 as the only flying hill active all year round.

First official flights for women started in season 2022/23 in Vikersund but didn't yet count for World Cup, only as international FIS competition. First women World Cup events started in season. 2023/24. In season 2025/26 Planica was added to women's calendar.

== Scoring system ==
Each season consists of 2–7 competitions, usually two competitions on the same hill during a weekend. One competition consists of a qualifying round, first round and second round. The top 10 jumpers in FIS ranking qualify directly to the first round, while the rest of the jumpers fight for the remaining 30 spots. The top 30 men in the first round advance to the second round, which is held in reverse order, so the best jumper in the first round jumps last. The aggregate score in the first and second rounds determine the competition results. The top 30 are awarded World Cup points. The winner gets 100 points while number 30 receives 1 point. At team events only top 8 receive points.

=== Individual ===
Seasons	1	2	3	4	5	6	7	8	9	10	11	12	13	14	15	16	17	18	19	20	21	22	23	24	25	26	27	28	29	30
1980–1993	25	20	15	12	11	10	9	8	7	6	5	4	3	2	1	points were not awarded														
1994–present	100	80	60	50	45	40	36	32	29	26	24	22	20	18	16	15	14	13	12	11	10	9	8	7	6	5	4	3	2	1

=== Men's team ===
Seasons	1	2	3	4	5	6	7	8	9	10	11	12	13
2000	200	160	120	100	90	80	points were not awarded						
2001–present	400	350	300	250	200	150	100	50	points are not being awarded				

== Full list ==
- World Cup / World Championships
- Raw Air
- Planica7
- Nordic Tournament
- FIS Team Tour

=== Men's Individual ===
#	Season	Date	Place	Size	Winner	Second	Third
1	1979/80	29 February 1980 (cancelled) 1 March 1980; 2 March 1980	(Norway) Vikersund	K155	(Norway) Per Bergerud	(Poland) Stanislaw Bobak	(Czechoslovakia) Ján Tánczoš
2	1980/81	13 February 1981	(United States) Ironwood	K155	(Austria) Alois Lipburger	(Austria) Andreas Felder	(United States) John Broman
3	1980/81	14 February 1981	(United States) Ironwood	K155	(Austria) Alois Lipburger	(Austria) Andreas Felder	(Austria) Fritz Koch
	1980/81	15 February 1981	(United States) Ironwood	K155	weather conditions		
4	1981/82	12 March 1982	(Austria) Tauplitz	K165	(Finland) Matti Nykänen	(Austria) Hubert Neuper	(Austria) Andreas Felder
5	1981/82	13 March 1982	(Austria) Tauplitz	K165	(Austria) Hubert Neuper	(Finland) Matti Nykänen	(Norway) Ole Bremseth
6	1981/82	14 March 1982	(Austria) Tauplitz	K165	(Austria) Hubert Neuper	(Norway) Ole Bremseth	(Austria) Armin Kogler
7	1982/83	18 February 1983	(Norway) Vikersund	K155	(Finland) Matti Nykänen	(Czechoslovakia) Pavel Ploc (Austria) Hans Wallner	
8	1982/83	19 February 1983	(Norway) Vikersund	K155	(Finland) Matti Nykänen	(Canada) Horst Bulau	(Finland) Tuomo Ylipulli
9	1982/83	20 February 1983	(Norway) Vikersund	K155	(Finland) Matti Nykänen	(Norway) Olav Hansson	(Czechoslovakia) Pavel Ploc
10	1983/84	17 March 1984	(Germany) Oberstdorf	K182	(Finland) Matti Nykänen	(Czechoslovakia) Pavel Ploc	(East Germany) Jens Weißflog
11	1983/84	18 March 1984	(Germany) Oberstdorf	K182	(Finland) Matti Nykänen	(East Germany) Jens Weißflog (Czechoslovakia) Pavel Ploc	
12	1984/85	23 February 1985	(Czechoslovakia) Harrachov	K180	(Norway) Ole Gunnar Fidjestøl	(Socialist Federal Republic of Yugoslavia) Miran Tepeš	(Czechoslovakia) Jiří Parma (Poland) Tadeusz Fijas (Norway) Trond Jøran Pedersen
	1984/85	24 February 1985	(Czechoslovakia) Harrachov	K180	weather conditions		
13	1985/86	15 February 1986	(Norway) Vikersund	K155	(Austria) Andreas Felder	(Finland) Matti Nykänen	(Poland) Piotr Fijas
14	1985/86	16 February 1986	(Norway) Vikersund	K155	(Austria) Andreas Felder	(Austria) Ernst Vettori	(Finland) Matti Nykänen
15	1986/87	14 March 1987	(Socialist Federal Republic of Yugoslavia) Planica	K185	(Austria) Andreas Felder	(Norway) Ole Gunnar Fidjestøl	(West Germany) Thomas Klauser
16	1986/87	15 March 1987	(Socialist Federal Republic of Yugoslavia) Planica	K185	(Norway) Ole Gunnar Fidjestøl	(Socialist Federal Republic of Yugoslavia) Matjaž Zupan	(Poland) Piotr Fijas
	1988/89	18 March 1989	(Czechoslovakia) Harrachov	K180	weather conditions		
17	1988/89	19 March 1989	(Czechoslovakia) Harrachov	K180	(Norway) Ole Gunnar Fidjestøl	(United States) Mike Holland	(Sweden) Jan Boklöv
18	1990/91	23 February 1991	(Austria) Tauplitz	K185	(Switzerland) Stephan Zünd	(Finland) Ari-Pekka Nikkola	(Sweden) Per-Inge Tällberg
19	1990/91	24 February 1991	(Austria) Tauplitz	K185	(Austria) Stefan Horngacher	(Germany) Ralph Gebstedt	(Austria) Heinz Kuttin
20	1990/91	23 March 1991	(Socialist Federal Republic of Yugoslavia) Planica	K185	(Sweden) Staffan Tällberg	(Switzerland) Stephan Zünd	(Germany) André Kiesewetter
21	1990/91	24 March 1991	(Socialist Federal Republic of Yugoslavia) Planica	K185	(Germany) Ralph Gebstedt	(Austria) Stefan Horngacher	(Germany) Dieter Thoma
22	1991/92	25 January 1992	(Germany) Oberstdorf	K182	(Austria) Werner Rathmayr	(Austria) Andreas Felder	(Sweden) Mikael Martinsson
23	1991/92	26 January 1992	(Germany) Oberstdorf	K182	(Austria) Werner Rathmayr	(Austria) Andreas Felder	(Austria) Andreas Goldberger
24	1991/92	22 March 1992	(Czechoslovakia) Harrachov	K180	(Japan) Noriaki Kasai	(Austria) Andreas Goldberger	(Italy) Roberto Cecon
	1991/92	23 March 1992	(Czechoslovakia) Harrachov	K180	strong wind		
25	1992/93	30 January 1993	(Austria) Tauplitz	K185	(Czech Republic) Jaroslav Sakala	(Austria) Werner Haim	(Austria) Andreas Goldberger
26	1992/93	31 January 1993	(Austria) Tauplitz	K185	(Czech Republic) Jaroslav Sakala	(France) Didier Mollard	(Austria) Andreas Goldberger
	1992/93	20 March 1993	(Norway) Vikersund	K175	weather conditions		
	1992/93	21 March 1993	(Norway) Vikersund	K175	weather conditions		
	1993/94	19 March 1994	(Slovenia) Planica	K185	strong wind		
27	1993/94	20 March 1994	(Slovenia) Planica	K185	(Czech Republic) Jaroslav Sakala	(Norway) Espen Bredesen	(Italy) Roberto Cecon
28	1994/95	18 February 1995	(Norway) Vikersund	K175	(Austria) Andreas Goldberger	(Japan) Takanobu Okabe	(Norway) Lasse Ottesen
29	1994/95	19 February 1995	(Norway) Vikersund	K175	(Austria) Andreas Goldberger	(Japan) Takanobu Okabe	(Italy) Roberto Cecon
30	1994/95	25 February 1995	(Germany) Oberstdorf	K182	(Austria) Andreas Goldberger	(Italy) Roberto Cecon	(Germany) Jens Weißflog
	1994/95	26 February 1995	(Germany) Oberstdorf	K182	weather conditions		
31	1995/96	10 February 1996	(Austria) Tauplitz	K185	(Finland) Janne Ahonen	(Austria) Andreas Goldberger	(Finland) Ari-Pekka Nikkola
32	1995/96	11 February 1996	(Austria) Tauplitz	K185	(Austria) Andreas Goldberger	(Germany) Christof Duffner	(Finland) Janne Ahonen
33	1995/96	9 March 1996	(Czech Republic) Harrachov	K180	(Austria) Andreas Goldberger	(Germany) Christof Duffner	(Czech Republic) Jaroslav Sakala
	1995/96	10 March 1996	(Czech Republic) Harrachov	K180	weather conditions		
34	1996/97	8 February 1997	(Austria) Tauplitz	K185	(Japan) Takanobu Okabe	(Austria) Andreas Goldberger	(Slovenia) Primož Peterka
35	1996/97	9 February 1997	(Austria) Tauplitz	K185	(Slovenia) Primož Peterka	(Austria) Andreas Goldberger	(Japan) Takanobu Okabe
36	1996/97	22 March 1997	(Slovenia) Planica	K185	(Japan) Takanobu Okabe	(Japan) Kazuyoshi Funaki	(Finland) Jani Soininen
37	1996/97	23 March 1997	(Slovenia) Planica	K185	(Japan) Akira Higashi	(Slovenia) Primož Peterka	(Norway) Lasse Ottesen
38	1997/98	24 January 1998	(Germany) Oberstdorf	K185	(Germany) Sven Hannawald	(Japan) Kazuyoshi Funaki	(Norway) Kristian Brenden
39	1997/98	25 January 1998	(Germany) Oberstdorf	K185	(Japan) Kazuyoshi Funaki	(Germany) Dieter Thoma	(Germany) Sven Hannawald
	1997/98	28 February 1998	(Norway) Vikersund	K175	weather conditions; first event next day		
40	1997/98	1 March 1998	(Norway) Vikersund	K175	(Austria) Andreas Widhölzl	(Germany) Sven Hannawald	(Japan) Akira Higashi
41	1997/98	1 March 1998	(Norway) Vikersund	K175	(Japan) Takanobu Okabe	(Japan) Hiroya Saito	(Japan) Noriaki Kasai
	1998/99	6 February 1999	(Czech Republic) Harrachov	K185	weather conditions		
	1998/99	7 February 1999	(Czech Republic) Harrachov	K185	weather conditions		
42	1998/99	19 March 1999	(Slovenia) Planica	K185	(Germany) Martin Schmitt	(Japan) Kazuyoshi Funaki	(Germany) Christof Duffner
43	1998/99	20 March 1999	(Slovenia) Planica	K185	(Japan) Hideharu Miyahira	(Germany) Martin Schmitt	(Japan) Noriaki Kasai
44	1998/99	21 March 1999	(Slovenia) Planica	K185	(Japan) Noriaki Kasai	(Japan) Hideharu Miyahira	(Germany) Martin Schmitt
45	1999/00	19 February 2000	(Austria) Tauplitz	K185	(Germany) Sven Hannawald	(Austria) Andreas Widhölzl	(Norway) Tommy Ingebrigtsen
	1999/00	20 February 2000	(Austria) Tauplitz	K185	weather conditions		
46	1999/00	19 March 2000	(Slovenia) Planica	K185	(Germany) Sven Hannawald	(Finland) Janne Ahonen	(Austria) Andreas Goldberger
47	2000/01	13 January 2001	(Czech Republic) Harrachov	K185	(Poland) Adam Malysz	(Germany) Martin Schmitt	(Finland) Risto Jussilainen
48	2000/01	14 January 2001	(Czech Republic) Harrachov	K185	(Poland) Adam Malysz	(Finland) Janne Ahonen	(Germany) Martin Schmitt
49	2000/01	3 March 2001	(Germany) Oberstdorf	K185	(Finland) Risto Jussilainen	(Finland) Veli-Matti Lindström	(Finland) Matti Hautamäki
50	2000/01	4 March 2001	(Germany) Oberstdorf	K185	(Germany) Martin Schmitt	(Poland) Adam Malysz	(Finland) Risto Jussilainen
51	2000/01	18 March 2001	(Slovenia) Planica	K185	(Germany) Martin Schmitt	(Finland) Risto Jussilainen	(Norway) Tommy Ingebrigtsen
	2001/02	24 March 2002	(Slovenia) Planica	K185	weather conditions		
52	2002/03	1 February 2003	(Austria) Tauplitz	K185	(Austria) Florian Liegl	(Germany) Sven Hannawald	(Poland) Adam Malysz
53	2002/03	2 February 2003	(Austria) Tauplitz	K185	(Germany) Sven Hannawald	(Austria) Florian Liegl	(Finland) Matti Hautamäki
54	2002/03	22 March 2003	(Slovenia) Planica	K185	(Finland) Matti Hautamäki	(Poland) Adam Malysz	(Austria) Martin Höllwarth
55	2002/03	23 March 2003	(Slovenia) Planica	K185	(Finland) Matti Hautamäki	(Germany) Sven Hannawald	(Japan) Hideharu Miyahira
56	2003/04	7 February 2004	(Germany) Oberstdorf	K185	(Norway) Roar Ljøkelsøy	(Finland) Janne Ahonen	(Japan) Noriaki Kasai
	2003/04	8 February 2004	(Germany) Oberstdorf	K185	weather conditions		
57	2004/05	15 February 2005	(Austria) Tauplitz	HS200	(Austria) Andreas Widhölzl	(Norway) Roar Ljøkelsøy	(Poland) Adam Malysz
58	2004/05	16 February 2005	(Austria) Tauplitz	HS200	(Poland) Adam Malysz	(Austria) Andreas Widhölzl	(Finland) Risto Jussilainen
59	2004/05	19 March 2005	(Slovenia) Planica	HS215	(Finland) Matti Hautamäki	(Austria) Andreas Widhölzl	(Norway) Bjørn Einar Romøren
60	2004/05	20 March 2005	(Slovenia) Planica	HS215	(Norway) Bjørn Einar Romøren	(Norway) Roar Ljøkelsøy	(Austria) Andreas Widhölzl
61	2005/06	18 March 2006	(Slovenia) Planica	HS215	(Norway) Bjørn Einar Romøren	(Norway) Roar Ljøkelsøy	(Austria) Martin Koch
62	2005/06	19 March 2006	(Slovenia) Planica	HS215	(Finland) Janne Happonen	(Austria) Martin Koch	(Slovenia) Robert Kranjec
63	2006/07	13 January 2007	(Norway) Vikersund	HS207	(Norway) Anders Jacobsen	(Austria) Thomas Morgenstern	(Finland) Matti Hautamäki
	2006/07	14 January 2007	(Norway) Vikersund	HS207	weather conditions		
64	2006/07	23 March 2007	(Slovenia) Planica	HS215	(Poland) Adam Malysz	(Switzerland) Simon Ammann	(Slovenia) Jernej Damjan
65	2006/07	24 March 2007	(Slovenia) Planica	HS215	(Poland) Adam Malysz	(Norway) Anders Jacobsen	(Austria) Martin Koch
66	2006/07	25 March 2007	(Slovenia) Planica	HS215	(Poland) Adam Malysz	(Switzerland) Simon Ammann	(Austria) Martin Koch
	2007/08	19 January 2008	(Czech Republic) Harrachov	HS205	first event next day		
67	2007/08	20 January 2008	(Czech Republic) Harrachov	HS205	(Finland) Janne Ahonen	(Norway) Tom Hilde	(Norway) Anders Jacobsen
	2007/08	20 January 2008	(Czech Republic) Harrachov	HS205	weather conditions		
68	2007/08	14 March 2008	(Slovenia) Planica	HS215	(Austria) Gregor Schlierenzauer	(Finland) Janne Ahonen	(Norway) Bjørn Einar Romøren
69	2007/08	16 March 2008	(Slovenia) Planica	HS215	(Austria) Gregor Schlierenzauer	(Austria) Martin Koch	(Finland) Janne Happonen
70	2008/09	10 January 2009	(Austria) Tauplitz	HS200	(Austria) Gregor Schlierenzauer	(Switzerland) Simon Ammann	(Austria) Martin Koch
71	2008/09	11 January 2009	(Austria) Tauplitz	HS200	(Austria) Gregor Schlierenzauer	(Finland) Harri Olli	(Switzerland) Simon Ammann
72	2008/09	14 February 2009	(Germany) Oberstdorf	HS213	(Finland) Harri Olli	(Norway) Anders Jacobsen	(Norway) Johan Remen Evensen
73	2008/09	15 March 2009	(Norway) Vikersund	HS207	(Austria) Gregor Schlierenzauer	(Switzerland) Simon Ammann	(Russia) Dimitry Vassiliev
74	2008/09	20 March 2009	(Slovenia) Planica	HS215	(Austria) Gregor Schlierenzauer	(Poland) Adam Malysz	(Russia) Dimitry Vassiliev
75	2008/09	22 March 2009	(Slovenia) Planica	HS215	(Finland) Harri Olli	(Poland) Adam Malysz	(Switzerland) Simon Ammann (Slovenia) Robert Kranjec
76	2009/10	9 January 2010	(Austria) Tauplitz	HS200	(Slovenia) Robert Kranjec	(Switzerland) Simon Ammann	(Austria) Martin Koch
77	2009/10	10 January 2010	(Austria) Tauplitz	HS200	(Austria) Gregor Schlierenzauer	(Slovenia) Robert Kranjec	(Finland) Harri Olli
78	2009/10	31 January 2010	(Germany) Oberstdorf	HS213	(Norway) Anders Jacobsen	(Slovenia) Robert Kranjec	(Norway) Johan Remen Evensen
79	2010/11	8 January 2011	(Czech Republic) Harrachov	HS205	(Austria) Martin Koch	(Austria) Thomas Morgenstern	(Poland) Adam Malysz
80	2010/11	9 January 2011	(Czech Republic) Harrachov	HS205	(Austria) Thomas Morgenstern	(Switzerland) Simon Ammann	(Czech Republic) Roman Koudelka
81	2010/11	5 February 2011	(Germany) Oberstdorf	HS213	(Austria) Martin Koch	(Norway) Tom Hilde	(Austria) Gregor Schlierenzauer
82	2010/11	12 February 2011	(Norway) Vikersund	HS225	(Austria) Gregor Schlierenzauer (Norway) Johan Remen Evensen		(Switzerland) Simon Ammann
83	2010/11	13 February 2011	(Norway) Vikersund	HS225	(Austria) Gregor Schlierenzauer	(Norway) Johan Remen Evensen	(Poland) Adam Malysz
84	2010/11	18 March 2011	(Slovenia) Planica	HS215	(Austria) Gregor Schlierenzauer	(Austria) Thomas Morgenstern	(Austria) Martin Koch
85	2010/11	20 March 2011	(Slovenia) Planica	HS215	(Poland) Kamil Stoch	(Slovenia) Robert Kranjec	(Poland) Adam Malysz
	2011/12	14 January 2012	(Austria) Tauplitz	HS200	first event next day		
86	2011/12	15 January 2012	(Austria) Tauplitz	HS200	(Slovenia) Robert Kranjec	(Austria) Thomas Morgenstern	(Norway) Anders Bardal
87	2011/12	15 January 2012	(Austria) Tauplitz	HS200	(Norway) Anders Bardal	(Japan) Daiki Ito	(Poland) Kamil Stoch
88	2011/12	18 February 2012	(Germany) Oberstdorf	HS213	(Austria) Martin Koch	(Japan) Daiki Ito	(Switzerland) Simon Ammann
89	2011/12	16 March 2012	(Slovenia) Planica	HS215	(Slovenia) Robert Kranjec	(Switzerland) Simon Ammann	(Austria) Martin Koch
90	2011/12	18 March 2012	(Slovenia) Planica	HS215	(Austria) Martin Koch	(Switzerland) Simon Ammann	(Slovenia) Robert Kranjec
91	2012/13	26 January 2013	(Norway) Vikersund	HS225	(Austria) Gregor Schlierenzauer	(Switzerland) Simon Ammann	(Slovenia) Robert Kranjec
92	2012/13	27 January 2013	(Norway) Vikersund	HS225	(Slovenia) Robert Kranjec	(Germany) Michael Neumayer	(Austria) Gregor Schlierenzauer
	2012/13	2 February 2013	(Czech Republic) Harrachov	HS205	first event next day		
93	2012/13	3 February 2013	(Czech Republic) Harrachov	HS205	(Austria) Gregor Schlierenzauer	(Slovenia) Robert Kranjec	(Czech Republic) Jan Matura
94	2012/13	3 February 2013	(Czech Republic) Harrachov	HS205	(Austria) Gregor Schlierenzauer	(Czech Republic) Jan Matura	(Slovenia) Jurij Tepeš
95	2012/13	16 February 2013	(Germany) Oberstdorf	HS213	(Germany) Richard Freitag	(Norway) Andreas Stjernen	(Austria) Gregor Schlierenzauer
96	2012/13	22 March 2013	(Slovenia) Planica	HS215	(Austria) Gregor Schlierenzauer	(Slovenia) Peter Prevc	(Poland) Piotr Żyła
97	2012/13	24 March 2013	(Slovenia) Planica	HS215	(Slovenia) Jurij Tepeš	(Norway) Rune Velta	(Slovenia) Peter Prevc
98	2013/14	11 January 2014	(Austria) Tauplitz	HS200	(Japan) Noriaki Kasai	(Slovenia) Peter Prevc	(Austria) Gregor Schlierenzauer
99	2013/14	12 January 2014	(Austria) Tauplitz	HS200	(Slovenia) Peter Prevc	(Austria) Gregor Schlierenzauer	(Japan) Noriaki Kasai
100	2014/15	10 January 2015	(Austria) Tauplitz	HS225	(Germany) Severin Freund	(Austria) Stefan Kraft	(Slovenia) Jurij Tepeš
	2014/15	11 January 2015	(Austria) Tauplitz	HS225	weather conditions		
101	2014/15	14 February 2015	(Norway) Vikersund	HS225	(Slovenia) Peter Prevc	(Norway) Anders Fannemel	(Japan) Noriaki Kasai
102	2014/15	15 February 2015	(Norway) Vikersund	HS225	(Germany) Severin Freund	(Norway) Anders Fannemel	(Norway) Johann André Forfang
103	2014/15	20 March 2015	(Slovenia) Planica	HS225	(Slovenia) Peter Prevc	(Slovenia) Jurij Tepeš	(Austria) Stefan Kraft
104	2014/15	22 March 2015	(Slovenia) Planica	HS225	(Slovenia) Jurij Tepeš	(Slovenia) Peter Prevc	(Norway) Rune Velta
105	2015/16	12 February 2016	(Norway) Vikersund	HS225	(Slovenia) Robert Kranjec	(Norway) Kenneth Gangnes	(Japan) Noriaki Kasai
106	2015/16	13 February 2016	(Norway) Vikersund	HS225	(Slovenia) Peter Prevc	(Norway) Johann André Forfang	(Slovenia) Robert Kranjec
107	2015/16	14 February 2016	(Norway) Vikersund	HS225	(Slovenia) Peter Prevc	(Austria) Stefan Kraft	(Norway) Andreas Stjernen
108	2015/16	17 March 2016	(Slovenia) Planica	HS225	(Slovenia) Peter Prevc	(Norway) Johann André Forfang	(Slovenia) Robert Kranjec
109	2015/16	18 March 2016	(Slovenia) Planica	HS225	(Slovenia) Robert Kranjec	(Slovenia) Peter Prevc	(Norway) Johann André Forfang
110	2015/16	20 March 2016	(Slovenia) Planica	HS225	(Slovenia) Peter Prevc	(Slovenia) Robert Kranjec	(Norway) Johann André Forfang
111	2016/17	4 February 2017	(Germany) Oberstdorf	HS225	(Austria) Stefan Kraft	(Germany) Andreas Wellinger	(Poland) Kamil Stoch
112	2016/17	5 February 2017	(Germany) Oberstdorf	HS225	(Austria) Stefan Kraft	(Germany) Andreas Wellinger	(Slovenia) Jurij Tepeš
113	2016/17	19 March 2017	(Norway) Vikersund	HS225	(Poland) Kamil Stoch	(Japan) Noriaki Kasai	(Austria) Michael Hayböck
114	2016/17	24 March 2017	(Slovenia) Planica	HS225	(Austria) Stefan Kraft	(Germany) Andreas Wellinger	(Germany) Markus Eisenbichler
115	2016/17	26 March 2017	(Slovenia) Planica	HS225	(Austria) Stefan Kraft	(Germany) Andreas Wellinger	(Japan) Noriaki Kasai
116	2017/18	13 January 2018	(Austria) Tauplitz	HS235	(Norway) Andreas Stjernen	(Norway) Daniel-André Tande	(Switzerland) Simon Ammann
	2017/18	14 January 2018	(Austria) Tauplitz	HS235	strong wind		
117	2017/18	18 March 2018	(Norway) Vikersund	HS240	(Norway) Robert Johansson	(Norway) Andreas Stjernen	(Norway) Daniel-André Tande
118	2017/18	23 March 2018	(Slovenia) Planica	HS240	(Poland) Kamil Stoch	(Norway) Johann André Forfang	(Austria) Stefan Kraft
119	2017/18	25 March 2018	(Slovenia) Planica	HS240	(Poland) Kamil Stoch	(Austria) Stefan Kraft	(Norway) Daniel-André Tande
120	2018/19	1 February 2019	(Germany) Oberstdorf	HS235	(Slovenia) Timi Zajc	(Poland) Dawid Kubacki	(Germany) Markus Eisenbichler
121	2018/19	2 February 2019	(Germany) Oberstdorf	HS235	(Japan) Ryōyū Kobayashi	(Germany) Markus Eisenbichler	(Austria) Stefan Kraft
122	2018/19	3 February 2019	(Germany) Oberstdorf	HS235	(Poland) Kamil Stoch	(Russia) Evgeniy Klimov	(Poland) Dawid Kubacki
123	2018/19	17 March 2019	(Norway) Vikersund	HS240	(Slovenia) Domen Prevc	(Japan) Ryōyū Kobayashi	(Austria) Stefan Kraft
124	2018/19	22 March 2019	(Slovenia) Planica	HS240	(Germany) Markus Eisenbichler	(Japan) Ryōyū Kobayashi	(Poland) Piotr Żyła
125	2018/19	24 March 2019	(Slovenia) Planica	HS240	(Japan) Ryōyū Kobayashi	(Slovenia) Domen Prevc	(Germany) Markus Eisenbichler
126	2019/20	15 February 2020	(Austria) Tauplitz	HS235	(Poland) Piotr Żyła	(Slovenia) Timi Zajc	(Austria) Stefan Kraft
127	2019/20	16 February 2020	(Austria) Tauplitz	HS235	(Austria) Stefan Kraft	(Japan) Ryōyū Kobayashi	(Slovenia) Timi Zajc
	2019/20	15 March 2020	(Norway) Vikersund	HS240	COVID-19 pandemic		
	2020/21	20 March 2021	(Norway) Vikersund	HS240	COVID-19 pandemic; rescheduled to Planica on 25 March 2021		
128	2020/21	25 March 2021	(Slovenia) Planica	HS240	(Japan) Ryōyū Kobayashi	(Germany) Markus Eisenbichler	(Germany) Karl Geiger
129	2020/21	26 March 2021	(Slovenia) Planica	HS240	(Germany) Karl Geiger	(Japan) Ryōyū Kobayashi	(Slovenia) Bor Pavlovčič
130	2020/21	28 March 2021	(Slovenia) Planica	HS240	(Germany) Karl Geiger	(Japan) Ryōyū Kobayashi	(Germany) Markus Eisenbichler
131	2021/22	19 March 2022	(Norway) Vikersund	HS240	(Austria) Stefan Kraft	(Slovenia) Žiga Jelar	(Slovenia) Timi Zajc
132	2021/22	20 March 2022	(Norway) Vikersund	HS240	(Slovenia) Timi Zajc	(Poland) Piotr Żyła	(Austria) Stefan Kraft
133	2021/22	25 March 2022	(Slovenia) Planica	HS240	(Slovenia) Žiga Jelar	(Slovenia) Peter Prevc	(Slovenia) Anže Lanišek
134	2021/22	27 March 2022	(Slovenia) Planica	HS240	(Norway) Marius Lindvik	(Japan) Yukiya Sato	(Slovenia) Peter Prevc
135	2022/23	28 January 2023	(Austria) Tauplitz	HS235	(Norway) Halvor Egner Granerud	(Austria) Stefan Kraft	(Slovenia) Domen Prevc
136	2022/23	29 January 2023	(Austria) Tauplitz	HS235	(Norway) Halvor Egner Granerud	(Slovenia) Timi Zajc	(Austria) Stefan Kraft
137	2022/23	18 March 2023	(Norway) Vikersund	HS240	(Norway) Halvor Egner Granerud	(Austria) Stefan Kraft	(Austria) Daniel Tschofenig
138	2022/23	19 March 2023	(Norway) Vikersund	HS240	(Austria) Stefan Kraft	(Norway) Halvor Egner Granerud	(Slovenia) Anže Lanišek
	2022/23	31 March 2023	(Slovenia) Planica	HS240	strong wind; rescheduled on the next day		
139	2022/23	1 April 2023	(Slovenia) Planica	HS240	(Austria) Stefan Kraft	(Slovenia) Anže Lanišek	(Poland) Piotr Żyła
140	2022/23	2 April 2023	(Slovenia) Planica	HS240	(Slovenia) Timi Zajc	(Slovenia) Anže Lanišek	(Austria) Stefan Kraft
141	2023/24	24 February 2024	(Germany) Oberstdorf	HS235	(Slovenia) Timi Zajc	(Slovenia) Peter Prevc	(Austria) Stefan Kraft
142	2023/24	25 February 2024	(Germany) Oberstdorf	HS235	(Austria) Stefan Kraft	(Slovenia) Peter Prevc	(Japan) Ryōyū Kobayashi
143	2023/24	16 March 2024	(Norway) Vikersund	HS240	(Austria) Stefan Kraft	(Austria) Daniel Huber	(Slovenia) Domen Prevc
144	2023/24	17 March 2024	(Norway) Vikersund	HS240	(Austria) Daniel Huber	(Austria) Stefan Kraft	(Slovenia) Timi Zajc
145	2023/24	22 March 2024	(Slovenia) Planica	HS240	(Slovenia) Peter Prevc	(Austria) Daniel Huber	(Norway) Johann André Forfang
146	2023/24	24 March 2024	(Slovenia) Planica	HS240	(Austria) Daniel Huber	(Slovenia) Domen Prevc	(Poland) Aleksander Zniszczoł
147	2024/25	25 January 2025	(Germany) Oberstdorf	HS235	(Slovenia) Timi Zajc	(Norway) Johann André Forfang	(Slovenia) Domen Prevc
148	2024/25	26 January 2025	(Germany) Oberstdorf	HS235	(Slovenia) Domen Prevc	(Norway) Johann André Forfang	(Austria) Michael Hayböck
149	2024/25	15 March 2025	(Norway) Vikersund	HS240	(Germany) Andreas Wellinger	(Slovenia) Timi Zajc	(Slovenia) Anže Lanišek
150	2024/25	16 March 2025	(Norway) Vikersund	HS240	(Slovenia) Domen Prevc	(Germany) Andreas Wellinger	(Japan) Ryōyū Kobayashi
151	2024/25	28 March 2025	(Slovenia) Planica	HS240	(Slovenia) Domen Prevc	(Slovenia) Anže Lanišek	(Japan) Ryōyū Kobayashi
152	2024/25	30 March 2025	(Slovenia) Planica	HS240	(Slovenia) Anže Lanišek	(Slovenia) Domen Prevc	(Germany) Andreas Wellinger
153	2025/26	28 February 2026	(Austria) Tauplitz	HS235	(Slovenia) Domen Prevc	(Austria) Stephan Embacher	(Austria) Jonas Schuster
154	2025/26	1 March 2026	(Austria) Tauplitz	HS235	(Slovenia) Domen Prevc	(Austria) Stephan Embacher	(Norway) Johann André Forfang
155	2025/26	21 March 2026	(Norway) Vikersund	HS240	(Austria) Stephan Embacher	(Japan) Tomofumi Naitō	(Norway) Johann André Forfang
	2025/26	22 March 2026	(Norway) Vikersund	HS240	cancelled due to strong wind		
156	2025/26	27 March 2026	(Slovenia) Planica	HS240	(Slovenia) Domen Prevc	(Japan) Ren Nikaido	(Austria) Daniel Tschofenig
157	2025/26	29 March 2026	(Slovenia) Planica	HS240	(Norway) Marius Lindvik	(Slovenia) Domen Prevc	(Norway) Johann André Forfang

Rank	Nation	Gold	Silver	Bronze
1	Austria	44	27	28
2	Slovenia	20	15	17
3	Finland	15	10	13
4	Germany	14	16	14
6	Norway	13	23	21
7	Japan	12	16	10
5	Poland	12	7	13
8	Czech Republic	3	7	6
9	Switzerland	1	10	5
10	Sweden	1	7	3
11	Yugoslavia		2	3
12	Canada		1	3
13	France		1	3
14	Italy		1	3
15	Russia		1	2
16	United States		1	1

=== Women's Individual ===
#	Season	Date	Place	Size	Winner	Second	Third
	2023/24	16 March 2024	(Norway) Vikersund	HS240	canceled due to bad weather conditions		
1	2023/24	17 March 2024	(Norway) Vikersund	HS240	(Norway) Eirin Maria Kvandal	(Norway) Silje Opseth	(Slovenia) Ema Klinec
2	2024/25	15 March 2025	(Norway) Vikersund	HS240	(Slovenia) Nika Prevc	(Slovenia) Ema Klinec	(Germany) Selina Freitag
	2024/25	16 March 2025	(Norway) Vikersund	HS240	canceled due to strong wind		
3	2025/26	21 March 2026	(Norway) Vikersund	HS240	(Norway) Eirin Maria Kvandal	(Sweden) Frida Westman	(Slovenia) Nika Prevc
4	2025/26	22 March 2026	(Norway) Vikersund	HS240	(Norway) Eirin Maria Kvandal	(Slovenia) Nika Prevc	(Norway) Anna Odine Strøm
5	2025/26	28 March 2026	(Slovenia) Planica	HS240	(Slovenia) Nika Prevc	(Norway) Eirin Maria Kvandal	(Japan) Nozomi Maruyama

=== Men's team ===
#	Season	Date	Place	Size	Winner	Second	Third
1	1999/00	18 March 2000	(Slovenia) Planica	K185	Germany	Finland	Japan
2	2000/01	17 March 2001	(Slovenia) Planica	K185	Finland	Austria	Japan
3	2001/02	23 March 2002	(Slovenia) Planica	K185	Finland	Germany	Austria
4	2002/03	21 March 2003	(Slovenia) Planica	K185	Finland	Norway	Austria
5	2007/08	15 March 2008	(Slovenia) Planica	HS215	Norway	Finland	Austria
6	2008/09	15 February 2009	(Germany) Oberstdorf	HS213	Finland	Russia	Austria
7	2008/09	14 March 2009	(Norway) Vikersund	HS207	Austria	Finland	Norway
8	2008/09	21 March 2009	(Slovenia) Planica	HS215	Norway	Poland	Russia
9	2009/10	30 January 2010	(Germany) Oberstdorf	HS213	Austria	Norway	Finland
10	2010/11	6 February 2011	(Germany) Oberstdorf	HS213	Austria	Norway	Germany
11	2010/11	19 March 2011	(Slovenia) Planica	HS215	Austria	Norway	Slovenia
12	2011/12	19 February 2012	(Germany) Oberstdorf	HS213	Slovenia	Austria	Norway
13	2011/12	17 March 2012	(Slovenia) Planica	HS215	Austria	Norway	Germany
14	2012/13	17 February 2013	(Germany) Oberstdorf	HS213	Norway	Austria	Slovenia
15	2012/13	23 March 2013	(Slovenia) Planica	HS215	Slovenia	Norway	Austria
16	2014/15	21 March 2015	(Slovenia) Planica	HS225	Slovenia	Austria	Norway
17	2015/16	19 March 2016	(Slovenia) Planica	HS225	Norway	Slovenia	Austria
18	2016/17	18 March 2017	(Norway) Vikersund	HS225	Norway	Poland	Austria
19	2016/17	25 March 2017	(Slovenia) Planica	HS225	Norway	Germany	Poland
20	2017/18	17 March 2018	(Norway) Vikersund	HS240	Norway	Poland	Slovenia
21	2017/18	24 March 2018	(Slovenia) Planica	HS240	Norway	Germany	Slovenia
22	2018/19	16 March 2019	(Norway) Vikersund	HS240	Slovenia	Germany	Austria
23	2018/19	23 March 2019	(Slovenia) Planica	HS240	Poland	Germany	Slovenia
	2019/20	14 March 2020	(Norway) Vikersund	HS240	COVID-19 pandemic		
	2020/21	19 March 2021	(Norway) Vikersund	HS240	COVID-19 pandemic		
24	2020/21	27 March 2021	(Slovenia) Planica	HS240	Germany	Japan	Austria
25	2021/22	26 March 2022	(Slovenia) Planica	HS240	Slovenia	Norway	Austria
26	2022/23	1 April 2023	(Slovenia) Planica	HS240	Austria	Slovenia	Norway
27	2023/24	23 March 2024	(Slovenia) Planica	HS240	Austria	Slovenia	Norway
28	2024/25	29 March 2025	(Slovenia) Planica	HS240	Austria	Germany	Slovenia
29	2025/26	28 March 2026	(Slovenia) Planica	HS240	Austria	Japan	Norway

Rank	Nation	Gold	Silver	Bronze
1	Norway	8	7	3
2	Austria	5	4	10
3	Finland	4	3	1
4	Slovenia	4	1	5
5	Germany	2	5	2
6	Poland	1	3	1
7	Japan		1	2
8	Russia			1

=== Men's super team ===
#	Season	Date	Place	Size	Winner	Second	Third
1	2023/24	23 February 2024	(Germany) Oberstdorf	HS235	Slovenia	Norway	Austria

== World Cup standings ==
=== Ski Flying (M) ===
Season	Winner	Runner-up	Third
1979/80	discipline not awarded / joined with overall ranking (K.O.P. Ski Flying Week Tournament)		
1980/81	discipline not awarded / joined with overall ranking (K.O.P. Ski Flying Week Tournament)		
1981/82	discipline not awarded / joined with overall ranking (K.O.P. Ski Flying Week Tournament)		
1982/83	discipline not awarded / joined with overall ranking (K.O.P. Ski Flying Week Tournament)		
1983/84	discipline not awarded / joined with overall ranking (K.O.P. Ski Flying Week Tournament)		
1984/85	discipline not awarded / joined with overall ranking (K.O.P. Ski Flying Week Tournament)		
1985/86	discipline not awarded / joined with overall ranking (K.O.P. Ski Flying Week Tournament)		
1986/87	discipline not awarded / joined with overall ranking (K.O.P. Ski Flying Week Tournament)		
1987/88	no competitions		
1988/89	discipline not awarded / joined with overall ranking (K.O.P. Ski Flying Week Tournament)		
1989/90	no competitions		
1990/91	(Switzerland) Stephan Zünd	(Austria) Stefan Horngacher	(Germany) Ralf Gebstedt
1991/92	(Austria) Werner Rathmayr	(Austria) Andreas Goldberger	(Austria) Andreas Felder
1992/93	(Czech Republic) Jaroslav Sakala	(France) Didier Mollard	(Austria) Andreas Goldberger
1993/94	(Czech Republic) Jaroslav Sakala	(Norway) Espen Bredesen	(Italy) Roberto Cecon
1994/95	(Austria) Andreas Goldberger	(Japan) Takanobu Okabe	(Italy) Roberto Cecon
1995/96	(Austria) Andreas Goldberger	(Finland) Janne Ahonen	(Germany) Christof Duffner
1996/97	(Slovenia) Primož Peterka	(Japan) Takanobu Okabe	(Japan) Kazuyoshi Funaki
1997/98	(Germany) Sven Hannawald	(Japan) Kazuyoshi Funaki	(Austria) Andreas Widhölzl (Slovenia) Primož Peterka
1998/99	(Germany) Martin Schmitt	(Japan) Noriaki Kasai	(Japan) Hideharu Miyahira
1999/00	(Germany) Sven Hannawald	(Finland) Janne Ahonen	(Norway) Tommy Ingebrigtsen
2000/01	(Germany) Martin Schmitt	(Poland) Adam Malysz	(Finland) Risto Jussilainen
2001/02	would be awarded / competition cancelled		
2002/03	discipline not awarded / joined with overall ranking		
2003/04	discipline not awarded / joined with overall ranking		
2004/05	discipline not awarded / joined with overall ranking		
2005/06	discipline not awarded / joined with overall ranking		
2006/07	discipline not awarded / joined with overall ranking		
2007/08	discipline not awarded / joined with overall ranking		
2008/09	(Austria) Gregor Schlierenzauer	(Finland) Harri Olli	(Switzerland) Simon Ammann
2009/10	(Slovenia) Robert Kranjec	(Austria) Gregor Schlierenzauer	(Switzerland) Simon Ammann
2010/11	(Austria) Gregor Schlierenzauer	(Austria) Martin Koch	(Austria) Thomas Morgenstern
2011/12	(Slovenia) Robert Kranjec	(Austria) Martin Koch	(Switzerland) Simon Ammann
2012/13	(Austria) Gregor Schlierenzauer	(Slovenia) Robert Kranjec	(Norway) Andreas Stjernen
2013/14	(Slovenia) Peter Prevc	(Japan) Noriaki Kasai	(Austria) Gregor Schlierenzauer
2014/15	(Slovenia) Peter Prevc	(Germany) Severin Freund	(Slovenia) Jurij Tepeš
2015/16	(Slovenia) Peter Prevc	(Slovenia) Robert Kranjec	(Norway) Johann André Forfang
2016/17	(Austria) Stefan Kraft	(Germany) Andreas Wellinger	(Poland) Kamil Stoch
2017/18	(Norway) Andreas Stjernen	(Poland) Kamil Stoch	(Norway) Robert Johansson
2018/19	(Japan) Ryoyu Kobayashi	(Germany) Markus Eisenbichler	(Poland) Piotr Żyła
2019/20	(Austria) Stefan Kraft	(Slovenia) Timi Zajc	(Poland) Piotr Żyła
2020/21	(Germany) Karl Geiger	(Japan) Ryōyū Kobayashi	(Germany) Markus Eisenbichler
2021/22	(Slovenia) Žiga Jelar	(Slovenia) Timi Zajc	(Austria) Stefan Kraft
2022/23	(Austria) Stefan Kraft	(Norway) Halvor Egner Granerud	(Slovenia) Anže Lanišek
2023/24	(Austria) Daniel Huber	(Austria) Stefan Kraft	(Slovenia) Peter Prevc
2024/25	(Slovenia) Domen Prevc	(Slovenia) Anže Lanišek	(Germany) Andreas Wellinger
2025/26	(Slovenia) Domen Prevc	(Austria) Stephan Embacher	(Norway) Johann André Forfang

Rank	Nation	Gold	Silver	Bronze
1	Austria	10	6	6
2	Slovenia	8	5	4
3	Germany	5	3	4
4	Czech Republic	2	—	—
5	Japan	1	6	2
6	Norway	1	2	4
7	Switzerland	1	—	3
8	Finland	—	3	1
9	Poland	—	2	3
10	France	—	1	—
11	Italy	—	—	2

=== Ski Flying (W) ===
Season	Winner	Runner-up	Third
2025/26	(Norway) Eirin Maria Kvandal	(Slovenia) Nika Prevc	(Norway) Anna Odine Strøm

=== Nations Cup unofficial ===
Season	Winner	Runner-up	Third
1979/80	discipline not awarded / joined with overall ranking		
1980/81	discipline not awarded / joined with overall ranking		
1981/82	discipline not awarded / joined with overall ranking		
1982/83	discipline not awarded / joined with overall ranking		
1983/84	discipline not awarded / joined with overall ranking		
1984/85	discipline not awarded / joined with overall ranking		
1985/86	discipline not awarded / joined with overall ranking		
1986/87	discipline not awarded / joined with overall ranking		
1987/88	no competitions		
1988/89	discipline not awarded / joined with overall ranking		
1989/90	no competitions		
1990/91	Austria	Germany	Sweden
1991/92	Austria	Czechoslovakia	Germany
1992/93	Austria	Norway	Czech Republic
1993/94	Norway	Czech Republic	Finland
1994/95	Japan	Austria	Finland
1995/96	Austria	Finland	Germany
1996/97	Japan	Norway	Slovenia
1997/98	Japan	Germany; Norway	
1998/99	Japan	Germany	Norway
1999/00	Germany	Austria	Finland
2000/01	Finland	Germany	Austria
2001/02	would be awarded / competition cancelled		
2002/03	discipline not awarded / joined with overall ranking		
2003/04	discipline not awarded / joined with overall ranking		
2004/05	discipline not awarded / joined with overall ranking		
2005/06	discipline not awarded / joined with overall ranking		
2006/07	discipline not awarded / joined with overall ranking		
2007/08	discipline not awarded / joined with overall ranking		
2008/09	Austria	Norway	Finland
2009/10	Austria	Norway	Finland
2010/11	Austria	Norway	Poland
2011/12	Austria	Norway	Slovenia
2012/13	Slovenia	Austria	Norway
2013/14	Slovenia	Austria	Japan
2014/15	Slovenia	Norway	Austria
2015/16	Norway	Slovenia	Austria
2016/17	Norway	Poland	Austria
2017/18	Norway	Poland	Slovenia
2018/19	Poland	Slovenia	Germany

== Stats ==
Events	Winners
157	59

update: 29 March 2026

=== Wins ===
Rank		Wins
1	(Austria) Gregor Schlierenzauer	14
2	(Austria) Stefan Kraft	10
3	(Slovenia) Peter Prevc	8
4	(Slovenia) Domen Prevc	7
5	(Finland) Matti Nykänen	6
	(Poland) Adam Małysz	6
	(Slovenia) Robert Kranjec	6
8	(Austria) Andreas Goldberger	5
	(Poland) Kamil Stoch	5
	(Slovenia) Timi Zajc	5
11	(Germany) Sven Hannawald	4
	(Austria) Martin Koch	4
13	(Norway) Ole Gunnar Fidjestøl	3
	(Austria) Andreas Felder	3
	(Czech Republic) Jaroslav Sakala	3
	(Japan) Takanobu Okabe	3
	(Germany) Martin Schmitt	3
	(Finland) Matti Hautamäki	3
	(Japan) Noriaki Kasai	3
	(Japan) Ryōyū Kobayashi	3
	(Norway) Halvor Egner Granerud	3
22	(Austria) Alois Lipburger	2
	(Austria) Hubert Neuper	2
	(Austria) Werner Rathmayr	2
	(Austria) Andreas Widhölzl	2
	(Norway) Bjørn Einar Romøren	2
	(Finland) Harri Olli	2
	(Norway) Anders Jacobsen	2
	(Finland) Janne Ahonen	2
	(Germany) Severin Freund	2
	(Slovenia) Jurij Tepeš	2
	(Austria) Daniel Huber	2
	(Germany) Karl Geiger	2
	(Norway) Marius Lindvik	2
35	(Norway) Per Bergerud	1
	(Switzerland) Stephan Zünd	1
	(Austria) Stefan Horngacher	1
	(Sweden) Staffan Tällberg	1
	(Germany) Ralph Gebstedt	1
	(Slovenia) Primož Peterka	1
	(Japan) Akira Higashi	1
	(Japan) Hideharu Miyahira	1
	(Finland) Risto Jussilainen	1
	(Austria) Florian Liegl	1
	(Norway) Roar Ljøkelsøy	1
	(Finland) Janne Happonen	1
	(Norway) Andreas Stjernen	1
	(Austria) Thomas Morgenstern	1
	(Norway) Johan Remen Evensen	1
	(Norway) Anders Bardal	1
	(Japan) Kazuyoshi Funaki	1
	(Germany) Richard Freitag	1
	(Norway) Robert Johansson	1
	(Germany) Markus Eisenbichler	1
	(Poland) Piotr Żyła	1
	(Slovenia) Žiga Jelar	1
	(Germany) Andreas Wellinger	1
	(Slovenia) Anže Lanišek	1
	(Austria) Stephan Embacher	1

=== Podiums ===
Rank		Podiums
1	(Austria) Stefan Kraft	25
2	(Austria) Gregor Schlierenzauer	19
3	(Slovenia) Robert Kranjec	17
	(Slovenia) Peter Prevc	17
5	(Poland) Adam Małysz	15
6	(Switzerland) Simon Ammann	14
	(Slovenia) Domen Prevc	14
8	(Austria) Andreas Goldberger	13
	(Austria) Martin Koch	13
10	(Norway) Johann André Forfang	12
11	(Japan) Noriaki Kasai	11
	(Slovenia) Timi Zajc	11
	(Japan) Ryōyū Kobayashi	11
14	(Finland) Matti Nykänen	9
15	(Germany) Sven Hannawald	8
	(Austria) Andreas Felder	8
17	(Germany) Martin Schmitt	7
	(Finland) Janne Ahonen	7
	(Poland) Kamil Stoch	7
	(Germany) Markus Eisenbichler	7
	(Slovenia) Anže Lanišek	7
	(Germany) Andreas Wellinger	7
23	(Austria) Andreas Widhölzl	6
	(Japan) Takanobu Okabe	6
	(Finland) Matti Hautamäki	6
	(Slovenia) Jurij Tepeš	6
27	(Norway) Anders Jacobsen	5
	(Austria) Thomas Morgenstern	5
	(Finland) Risto Jussilainen	5
	(Poland) Piotr Żyła	5
31	(Norway) Ole Gunnar Fidjestøl	4
	(Czech Republic) Jaroslav Sakala	4
	(Norway) Johan Remen Evensen	4
	(Norway) Roar Ljøkelsøy	4
	(Czechoslovakia) Pavel Ploc	4
	(Italy) Roberto Cecon	4
	(Norway) Bjørn Einar Romøren	4
	(Finland) Harri Olli	4
	(Norway) Andreas Stjernen	4
	(Japan) Kazuyoshi Funaki	4
	(Norway) Halvor Egner Granerud	4
	(Austria) Daniel Huber	4

=== Top ten appearances ===
Rank		Top 10s
1	(Austria) Stefan Kraft	43
2	(Slovenia) Robert Kranjec	39
3	(Norway) Johann André Forfang	36
4	(Slovenia) Peter Prevc	35
4	(Poland) Adam Małysz	34
	(Japan) Noriaki Kasai	34
7	(Switzerland) Simon Ammann	33
8	(Poland) Kamil Stoch	32
	(Slovenia) Domen Prevc	32
10	(Austria) Gregor Schlierenzauer	30
11	(Finland) Janne Ahonen	29
12	(Austria) Martin Koch	27
	(Poland) Piotr Żyła	27
	(Japan) Ryōyū Kobayashi	27
15	(Germany) Severin Freund	23
	(Austria) Michael Hayböck	23
17	(Austria) Andreas Goldberger	22
	(Finland) Matti Hautamäki	22
	(Slovenia) Timi Zajc	22

== Medals table ==
=== Individual ===
(As of 28 February 2026)

Rank		1st	2nd	3rd	Total
1	(Austria) Gregor Schlierenzauer	14	1	4	19
2	(Austria) Stefan Kraft	10	6	9	25
3	(Slovenia) Peter Prevc	8	7	2	17
4	(Slovenia) Domen Prevc	7	4	3	14
5	(Slovenia) Robert Kranjec	6	5	6	17
6	(Poland) Adam Małysz	6	4	5	15
7	(Finland) Matti Nykänen	6	2	1	9
8	(Austria) Andreas Goldberger	5	4	4	13
9	(Slovenia) Timi Zajc	5	3	3	11
10	(Poland) Kamil Stoch	5	0	2	7
11	(Germany) Sven Hannawald	4	3	1	8
12	(Austria) Martin Koch	4	2	7	13
13	(Japan) Ryōyū Kobayashi	3	5	3	11
14	(Austria) Andreas Felder	3	4	1	8
15	(Germany) Martin Schmitt	3	2	2	7
16	(Japan) Takanobu Okabe	3	2	1	6
17	(Japan) Noriaki Kasai	3	1	7	11
18	(Norway) Ole Gunnar Fidjestøl	3	1	0	4
	(Norway) Halvor Egner Granerud	3	1	0	4
20	(Finland) Matti Hautamäki	3	0	3	6
21	(Czech Republic) Jaroslav Sakala	3	0	1	4
22	(Finland) Janne Ahonen	2	4	1	7
23	(Austria) Andreas Widhölzl	2	3	1	6
24	(Norway) Anders Jacobsen	2	2	1	5
25	(Slovenia) Jurij Tepeš	2	1	3	6
26	(Finland) Harri Olli	2	1	1	4
27	(Austria) Hubert Neuper	2	1	0	3
28	(Germany) Karl Geiger	2	0	1	3
29	(Norway) Bjørn Einar Romøren	2	0	2	4
30	(Germany) Severin Freund	2	0	0	2
	(Austria) Werner Rathmayr	2	0	0	2
	(Austria) Alois Lipburger	2	0	0	2
	(Norway) Marius Lindvik	2	0	0	2
34	(Germany) Andreas Wellinger	1	5	1	7
35	(Austria) Thomas Morgenstern	1	4	0	5
36	(Norway) Roar Ljøkelsøy	1	3	0	4
	(Japan) Kazuyoshi Funaki	1	3	0	4
38	(Slovenia) Anže Lanišek	1	2	4	7
39	(Germany) Markus Eisenbichler	1	2	3	6
40	(Norway) Andreas Stjernen	1	2	1	4
41	(Austria) Daniel Huber	1	2	0	3
	(Austria) Stephan Embacher	1	2	0	3
43	(Finland) Risto Jussilainen	1	1	3	5
	(Poland) Piotr Żyła	1	1	3	5
45	(Norway) Johan Remen Evensen	1	1	2	4
46	(Slovenia) Primož Peterka	1	1	1	3
	(Japan) Hideharu Miyahira	1	1	1	3
48	(Switzerland) Stephan Zünd	1	1	0	2
	(Austria) Stefan Horngacher	1	1	0	2
	(Austria) Florian Liegl	1	1	0	2
	(Germany) Ralph Gebstedt	1	1	0	2
	(Slovenia) Žiga Jelar	1	1	0	2
53	(Finland) Janne Happonen	1	0	1	2
	(Norway) Anders Bardal	1	0	1	2
	(Japan) Akira Higashi	1	0	1	2
56	(Norway) Per Bergerud	1	0	0	1
	(Sweden) Staffan Tällberg	1	0	0	1
	(Germany) Richard Freitag	1	0	0	1
	(Norway) Robert Johansson	1	0	0	1
60	(Switzerland) Simon Ammann	0	9	5	14
61	(Norway) Johann André Forfang	0	5	7	12
62	(Czechoslovakia) Pavel Ploc	0	3	1	4
63	(Germany) Christof Duffner	0	2	1	3
64	(Norway) Tom Hilde	0	2	0	2
	(Japan) Daiki Ito	0	2	0	2
	(Norway) Anders Fannemel	0	2	0	2
67	(Italy) Roberto Cecon	0	1	3	4
68	(East Germany) / (Germany) Jens Weißflog (2/1)	0	1	2	3
	(Norway) Daniel-André Tande	0	1	2	3
70	(Norway) Ole Bremseth	0	1	1	2
	(Germany) Dieter Thoma	0	1	1	2
	(Finland) Ari-Pekka Nikkola	0	1	1	2
	(Norway) Rune Velta	0	1	1	2
	(Czech Republic) Jan Matura	0	1	1	2
	(Poland) Dawid Kubacki	0	1	1	2
76	(Socialist Federal Republic of Yugoslavia) Miran Tepeš	0	1	0	1
	(Poland) Stanislaw Bobak	0	1	0	1
	(Austria) Hans Wallner	0	1	0	1
	(Canada) Horst Bulau	0	1	0	1
	(Norway) Olav Hansson	0	1	0	1
	(United States) Mike Holland	0	1	0	1
	(Austria) Werner Haim	0	1	0	1
	(France) Didier Mollard	0	1	0	1
	(Japan) Hiroya Saito	0	1	0	1
	(Norway) Espen Bredesen	0	1	0	1
	(Germany) Michael Neumayer	0	1	0	1
	(Austria) Ernst Vettori	0	1	0	1
	(Socialist Federal Republic of Yugoslavia) Matjaž Zupan	0	1	0	1
	(Finland) Veli-Matti Lindström	0	1	0	1
	(Norway) Kenneth Gangnes	0	1	0	1
	(Russia) Evgeniy Klimov	0	1	0	1
	(Japan) Yukiya Satō	0	1	0	1
94	(Poland) Piotr Fijas	0	0	2	2
	(Norway) Lasse Ottesen	0	0	2	2
	(Norway) Tommy Ingebrigtsen	0	0	2	2
	(Russia) Dimitry Vassiliev	0	0	2	2
	(Austria) Michael Hayböck	0	0	2	2
	(Austria) Daniel Tschofenig	0	0	2	2
100	(Norway) Kristian Brenden	0	0	1	1
	(Austria) Martin Höllwarth	0	0	1	1
	(Germany) André Kiesewetter	0	0	1	1
	(Austria) Armin Kogler	0	0	1	1
	(Sweden) Mikael Martinsson	0	0	1	1
	(Finland) Jani Soininen	0	0	1	1
	(Czechoslovakia) Ján Tánczoš	0	0	1	1
	(United States) John Broman	0	0	1	1
	(Finland) Tuomo Ylipulli	0	0	1	1
	(Sweden) Jan Boklöv	0	0	1	1
	(Sweden) Per-Inge Tällberg	0	0	1	1
	(Austria) Heinz Kuttin	0	0	1	1
	(Czechoslovakia) Jiří Parma	0	0	1	1
	(Poland) Tadeusz Fijas	0	0	1	1
	(Norway) Trond Jøran Pedersen	0	0	1	1
	(West Germany) Thomas Klauser	0	0	1	1
	(Austria) Fritz Koch	0	0	1	1
	(Slovenia) Jernej Damjan	0	0	1	1
	(Czech Republic) Roman Koudelka	0	0	1	1
	(Slovenia) Bor Pavlovčič	0	0	1	1
	(Poland) Aleksander Zniszczoł	0	0	1	1
	(Austria) Jonas Schuster	0	0	1	1
	(Japan) Ren Nikaidō	0	0	1	1

=== Men's Team events ===
(As of 28 March 2026)

Rank		1st	2nd	3rd	Total
1	Austria	9	4	10	23
2	Norway	8	7	6	21
3	Slovenia	5	3	6	14
4	Finland	4	3	1	8
5	Germany	2	6	2	10
6	Poland	1	3	1	5
7	Japan	0	2	2	4
8	Russia	0	1	1	2

=== Men's super team events ===
(As of 23 February 2024)

Rank		1st	2nd	3rd	Total
1	Slovenia	1	0	0	1
2	Norway	0	1	0	1
3	Austria	0	0	1	1

=== Titles ===
Rank		1st	2nd	3rd
1	(Austria) Gregor Schlierenzauer	3	1	1
	(Austria) Stefan Kraft	3	1	1
3	(Slovenia) Peter Prevc	3	0	1
4	(Slovenia) Robert Kranjec	2	2	0
5	(Austria) Andreas Goldberger	2	1	1
6	(Czech Republic) Jaroslav Sakala	2	0	0
	(Germany) Sven Hannawald	2	0	0
	(Germany) Martin Schmitt	2	0	0
9	(Slovenia) Primož Peterka	1	0	1
10	(Austria) Werner Rathmayr	1	0	0
	(Switzerland) Stephan Zünd	1	0	0
	(Norway) Andreas Stjernen	1	0	0
	(Japan) Ryōyū Kobayashi	1	0	0
	(Germany) Karl Geiger	1	0	0
	(Slovenia) Žiga Jelar	1	0	0
	(Austria) Daniel Huber	1	0	0
	(Slovenia) Domen Prevc	1	0	0

=== Titles by country ===
As of 28 March 2025

Rank		Titles
1	Austria	10
2	Slovenia	8
3	Germany	5
4	Czech Republic	2
5	Switzerland	1
	Norway	1
	Japan	1

=== Men's Individual wins by country ===
As of 29 March 2026

Rank		Wins
1	Austria	50
2	Slovenia	31
3	Norway	18
4	Finland	15
	Germany	15
6	Japan	12
	Poland	12
8	Czech Republic	3
9	Switzerland	1
	Sweden	1

=== Women's Individual wins by country ===
As of 28 March 2025

Rank		Wins
1	Norway	3
2	Slovenia	2

=== Total wins by country ===
As of 29 March 2026

Rank		Wins
1	Austria	59
2	Slovenia	38
3	Norway	29
4	Finland	19
5	Germany	17
6	Poland	13
7	Japan	12
8	Czech Republic	3
9	Switzerland	1
	Sweden	1

=== Individual team wins ===
As of 27 March 2022

Rank		Wins
1	(Austria) Martin Koch	5
	(Norway) Andreas Stjernen	5
	(Austria) Gregor Schlierenzauer	5
	(Norway) Johann André Forfang	5
	(Slovenia) Peter Prevc	5
6	(Austria) Thomas Morgenstern	4
	(Austria) Andreas Kofler	4
	(Norway) Daniel-André Tande	4
	(Norway) Robert Johansson	4

== Various ==
=== Timeline calendar ===
Season	Men			Women
Season	Individual	Team	Superteam	Individual
1979/80	1	—	—	—
1980/81	2	—	—	—
1981/82	3	—	—	—
1982/83	3	—	—	—
1983/84	2	—	—	—
1984/85	1	—	—	—
1985/86	2	—	—	—
1986/87	2	—	—	—
1987/88	—	—	—	—
1988/89	1	—	—	—
1989/90	—	—	—	—
1990/91	4	—	—	—
1991/92	3	—	—	—
1992/93	2	—	—	—
1993/94	1	—	—	—
1994/95	3	—	—	—
1995/96	3	—	—	—
1996/97	4	—	—	—
1997/98	4	—	—	—
1998/99	3	—	—	—
1999/00	2	1	—	—
2000/01	5	1	—	—
2001/02	—	1	—	—
2002/03	4	1	—	—
2003/04	1	—	—	—
2004/05	4	—	—	—
2005/06	2	—	—	—
2006/07	4	—	—	—
2007/08	3	1	—	—
2008/09	6	3	—	—
2009/10	3	1	—	—
2010/11	7	2	—	—
2011/12	5	2	—	—
2012/13	7	2	—	—
2013/14	2	—	—	—
2014/15	5	1	—	—
2015/16	6	1	—	—
2016/17	5	2	—	—
2017/18	4	1	—	—
2018/19	6	2	—	—
2019/20	2	—	—	—
2020/21	3	—	—	—
2021/22	4	1	—	—
2022/23	6	1	—	—
2023/24	6	1	1	1
2024/25	6	1	—	1
2025/26	5	1	—	2
Total events	157	29	1	4
Double wins	1	—	—	—
Total winners	158	29	1	4

Last updated: 29 March 2026

=== Men's Individual hosts ===
Rank		Events
1	(Socialist Federal Republic of Yugoslavia) (Slovenia) Planica	55
2	(Austria) Tauplitz / Bad Mitterndorf	32
3	(Norway) Vikersund	31
4	(West Germany) (Germany) Oberstdorf	26
5	(Czechoslovakia) (Czech Republic) Harrachov	11
6	(United States) Ironwood	2
	Total	157

=== Men's team hosts ===
Rank		Events
1	(Slovenia) Planica	20
2	(Germany) Oberstdorf	5
3	(Norway) Vikersund	4
	Total	29

=== Men's superteam team hosts ===
Rank		Events
1	(Germany) Oberstdorf	1
	Total	1

=== Women's individual hosts ===
Rank		Events
1	(Norway) Vikersund	4
	Total	4

=== Most points in a ski flying season ===
Rank		Points	Season
1	(Austria) Gregor Schlierenzauer	544	2012/13
2	(Slovenia) Peter Prevc	530	2015/16
3	(Slovenia) Domen Prevc	485	2024/25
4	(Austria) Stefan Kraft	480	2022/23
5	(Austria) Gregor Schlierenzauer	477	2008/09

=== Ski flying rankings overall leader ===
Rank		Events
1	(Austria) Gregor Schlierenzauer	16
2	(Austria) Stefan Kraft	13
3	(Slovenia) Robert Kranjec	9
	(Slovenia) Domen Prevc	9
5	(Slovenia) Peter Prevc	7
6	(Austria) Andreas Goldberger	5
	(Germany) Sven Hannawald	5
	(Norway) Halvor Egner Granerud	5
9	(Switzerland) Stephan Zünd	4
	(Germany) Martin Schmitt	4
	(Poland) Adam Małysz	4
	(Germany) Severin Freund	4
	(Japan) Ryōyū Kobayashi	4
	(Slovenia) Timi Zajc	4
15	(Austria) Werner Rathmayr	3
	(Czech Republic) Jaroslav Sakala	3
	(Japan) Takanobu Okabe	3
	(Austria) Martin Koch	3
	(Norway) Andreas Stjernen	3
20	(Slovenia) Primož Peterka	2
	(Poland) Kamil Stoch	2
	(Germany) Markus Eisenbichler	2
	(Slovenia) Žiga Jelar	2
24	(Finland) Janne Ahonen	1
	(Austria) Thomas Morgenstern	1
	(Norway) Anders Bardal	1
	(Japan) Kazuyoshi Funaki	1
	(Japan) Noriaki Kasai	1
	(Japan) Daiki Itō	1
	(Poland) Piotr Żyła	1
	(Germany) Karl Geiger	1
	(Germany) Halvor Egner Granerud	1
	(Austria) Daniel Huber	1
	(Austria) Stephan Embacher	1
	Total	127

updated: 29 March 2026

- officially awarded seasons only (1991–2001, 2009–present)
