= 2020–21 FIS Ski Flying World Cup =

FIS Ski Flying World Cup 2020/21
Winners
- Overall: (Germany) Karl Geiger

Competitions
- Venues: 1
- Individual: 3
- Team: 1
- Cancelled: 1 Team
- Rescheduled: 1 Team + 1 Individual

The 2020–21 FIS Ski Flying World Cup was the 24th official World Cup season in ski flying. The winner was awarded with small crystal globe as the subdiscipline of FIS Ski Jumping World Cup.

== Map of World Cup hosts ==
(Norway) ~~Vikersund~~	(Slovenia) Planica
~~Vikersundbakken~~	Letalnica bratov Gorišek
Europe

== Calendar ==
=== Men's Individual ===
All	No.	Date	Place (Hill)	Size	Winner	Second	Third	Ski flying leader	R.
FIS Ski Flying World Championships 2020 (11 – 12 December • (Slovenia) Planica) originally scheduled already in March 2020, but then cancelled due to COVID-19
prologue		19 March 2021	(Norway) Vikersund (Vikersundbakken HS240)	F _{Qro}	cancelled due to the COVID-19 pandemic (Vikersund event was rescheduled to Planica on 25 March)			—	
team		20 March 2021	(Norway) Vikersund (Vikersundbakken HS240)	F _{T}	cancelled due to the COVID-19 pandemic (Vikersund event was rescheduled to Planica on 25 March)			—	
		21 March 2021	(Norway) Vikersund (Vikersundbakken HS240)	F _{cnx}	cancelled due to the COVID-19 pandemic (Vikersund event was rescheduled to Planica on 25 March)			—	
1025	2	(Note: Men's cancelled individual ski flying event in Vikersund (21 March) was rescheduled to Planica (25 March).)25 March 2021	(Slovenia) Planica (Letalnica b. Gorišek HS240)	F _{128}	(Japan) Ryōyū Kobayashi	(Germany) Markus Eisenbichler	(Germany) Karl Geiger	(Japan) Ryōyū Kobayashi	
qualifying		26 March 2021	(Slovenia) Planica (Letalnica b. Gorišek HS240)	F _{Qro}	cancelled due to wind conditions			—	
1026	3	(Note: Men's individual ski flying event in Planica (26 March) had only one round due to strong wind.)26 March 2021	(Slovenia) Planica (Letalnica b. Gorišek HS240)	F _{129}	(Germany) Karl Geiger	(Japan) Ryōyū Kobayashi	(Slovenia) Bor Pavlovčič	(Japan) Ryōyū Kobayashi	
team		27 March 2021	(Slovenia) Planica (Letalnica b. Gorišek HS240)	F _{cnx}	cancelled due to wind after 21 jumpers and replaced on 28 March			—	
team		(Note: Men's cancelled individual ski flying event in Planica (27 March) was rescheduled on 28 March with only one round due to strong wind.)28 March 2021	(Slovenia) Planica (Letalnica b. Gorišek HS240)	F _{Tev}	(Norway) H. Egner Granerud	(Austria) Daniel Huber	(Germany) Markus Eisenbichler	—	
1027	4	28 March 2021	(Slovenia) Planica (Letalnica b. Gorišek HS240)	F _{130}	(Germany) Karl Geiger	(Japan) Ryōyū Kobayashi	(Germany) Markus Eisenbichler	(Germany) Karl Geiger	
3rd Planica7 Overall (24 – 28 March 2021)					(Germany) Karl Geiger	(Japan) Ryōyū Kobayashi	(Germany) Markus Eisenbichler	Planica7	
24th FIS Ski Flying Men's Overall (15 – 16 February 2020)					(Germany) Karl Geiger	(Japan) Ryōyū Kobayashi	(Germany) Markus Eisenbichler	Ski Flying Overall	

=== Men's team ===
All	No.	Date	Place (Hill)	Size	Winner	Second	Third	R.
		20 March 2021	(Norway) Vikersund (Vikersundbakken HS240)	F _{cnx}	cancelled due to the COVID-19 pandemic			
		27 March 2021	(Slovenia) Planica (Letalnica bratov Gorišek HS240)	F _{cnx}	cancelled due to wind after 21 jumpers and replaced on 28 March			
111	1	(Note: Men's cancelled team event in Planica (27 March) was reschedule on 28 March with only one round.)28 March 2021	(Slovenia) Planica (Letalnica bratov Gorišek HS240)	F _{024}	Germany Pius Paschke; Constantin Schmid; Markus Eisenbichler; Karl Geiger	Japan Naoki Nakamura; Junshiro Kobayashi; Yukiya Satō; Ryōyū Kobayashi	Austria Daniel Huber; Markus Schiffner; Stefan Kraft; Michael Hayböck	

Raw Air 2021 (part of)
Planica7 (2021) (part of)

== Standings ==
=== Ski Flying ===
Rank	after all 3 events	Points
	(Germany) Karl Geiger (2 wins)	260
2	(Japan) R. Kobayashi (1 win)	260
3	(Germany) Markus Eisenbichler	172
4	(Slovenia) Bor Pavlovčič	141
5	(Slovenia) Domen Prevc	132
6	(Austria) Daniel Huber	114
7	(Norway) Robert Johansson	110
8	(Japan) Yukiya Satō	109
9	(Austria) Michael Hayböck	94
10	(Poland) Piotr Żyła	82
