= 2024–25 FIS Ski Flying World Cup =

Discipline	Men	Women
Overall	(Slovenia) Domen Prevc	crystal globe not awarded

Competition
Edition	28th	–
Locations	3	1
Individual	6	1
Team	1	–
Cancelled	–	1

The 2024–25 FIS Ski Flying World Cup was the 28th men's official World Cup season in ski flying and the unofficial ski flying season for women which was not awarded with small crystal globe as there was only one competition held (and one cancelled).

FIS Ski Flying World Cup is a subdisciple of Ski Jumping World Cup.

Overall ski flying leader and winner will be wearing red jersey.

== Map of World Cup hosts ==
(Germany) Oberstdorf	(Norway) Vikersund	(Slovenia) Planica
Heini-Klopfer	Vikersundbakken	Letalnica bratov Gorišek
Europe

== World records ==
List of world record distances achieved in ski flying within this World Cup season.

Date	Athlete	Hill	Round	Place	Metres	Feet
Women
14 March 2025	(Slovenia) Nika Prevc	Vikersundbakken HS240	Training – R1	Vikersund, Norway	236	774
14 March 2025	(Slovenia) Nika Prevc	Vikersundbakken HS240	Training – R3	Vikersund, Norway	236	774
Men
30 March 2025	(Slovenia) Domen Prevc	Letalnica bratov Gorišek HS240	Final	Planica, Slovenia	254.5	835

== Calendar ==
=== Men's Individual ===
All	No.	Date	Place (Hill)	Size	Winner	Second	Third	Overall leader	R.
1135	1	25 January 2025	(Germany) Oberstdorf (Heini-Klopfer HS235)	F _{147}	(Slovenia) Timi Zajc	(Norway) Johann André Forfang	(Slovenia) Domen Prevc	(Slovenia) Timi Zajc	
1136	2	26 January 2025	(Germany) Oberstdorf (Heini-Klopfer HS235)	F _{148}	(Slovenia) Domen Prevc	(Norway) Johann André Forfang	(Austria) Michael Hayböck	(Slovenia) Domen Prevc	
prologue		14 March 2025	(Norway) Vikersund (Vikersundbakken HS240)	F _{Qro}	(Slovenia) Domen Prevc	(Austria) Stefan Kraft	(Slovenia) Timi Zajc	—	
1144	3	15 March 2025	(Norway) Vikersund (Vikersundbakken HS240)	F _{149}	(Germany) Andreas Wellinger	(Slovenia) Timi Zajc	(Slovenia) Anže Lanišek	(Slovenia) Domen Prevc	
prologue		(Note: Individual men's ski flying event in Vikersund (16 March) had only one round due to strong wind.)16 March 2025	(Norway) Vikersund (Vikersundbakken HS240)	F _{Qro}	cancelled due to strong wind			—	
1145	4	16 March 2025	(Norway) Vikersund (Vikersundbakken HS240)	F _{150}	(Slovenia) Domen Prevc	(Germany) Andreas Wellinger	(Japan) Ryōyū Kobayashi	(Slovenia) Domen Prevc	
8th Raw Air Men's Overall (13 – 16 March 2025; Oslo included)					(Germany) Andreas Wellinger	(Slovenia) Domen Prevc	(Japan) Ryōyū Kobayashi	Raw Air	
qualifying		27 March 2025	(Slovenia) Planica (Letalnica b. Gorišek HS240)	F _{Qro}	(Germany) Andreas Wellinger	(Germany) Pius Paschke	(Germany) Markus Eisenbichler	—	
1147	5	28 March 2025	(Slovenia) Planica (Letalnica b. Gorišek HS240)	F _{151}	(Slovenia) Domen Prevc	(Slovenia) Anže Lanišek	(Japan) Ryōyū Kobayashi	(Slovenia) Domen Prevc	
team		29 March 2025	(Slovenia) Planica (Letalnica b. Gorišek HS240)	F _{T}	(Slovenia) Domen Prevc	(Germany) Andreas Wellinger	(Slovenia) Anže Lanišek	—	
1148	6	30 March 2025	(Slovenia) Planica (Letalnica b. Gorišek HS240)	F _{152}	(Slovenia) Anže Lanišek	(Slovenia) Domen Prevc	(Germany) Andreas Wellinger	(Slovenia) Domen Prevc	
7th Planica7 Overall (27 – 30 March 2025)					(Slovenia) Domen Prevc	(Slovenia) Anže Lanišek	(Germany) Andreas Wellinger	Planica7	
28th FIS Ski Flying Men's Overall (25 January – 30 March 2025)					(Slovenia) Domen Prevc	(Slovenia) Anže Lanišek	(Germany) Andreas Wellinger	Ski Flying Overall	

=== Women's Individual ===
All	No.	Date	Place (Hill)	Size	Winner	Second	Third	Note	R.
255	1	(Note: Ind. women's event in Vikersund (15 March) interrupted before last jumper in 1st round due to strong wind. And rescheduled on later with one round only.)15 March 2025	(Norway) Vikersund (Vikersundbakken HS240)	F _{002}	(Slovenia) Nika Prevc	(Slovenia) Ema Klinec	(Germany) Selina Freitag	no leader	
		16 March 2025	(Norway) Vikersund (Vikersundbakken HS240)	F _{cnx}	cancelled due to strong wind			—	
5th Raw Air Women's Overall (13 – 16 March 2025; Oslo included)					(Slovenia) Nika Prevc	(Norway) Eirin Maria Kvandal	(Norway) Anna Odine Strøm	Raw Air	

=== Men's team ===
All	No.	Date	Place (Hill)	Size	Winner	Second	Third	R.
124	1	29 March 2025	(Slovenia) Planica (Letalnica b. Gorišek HS240)	F _{029}	Austria Daniel Tschofenig; Manuel Fettner; Jan Hörl; Stefan Kraft	Germany Karl Geiger; Andreas Wellinger; Pius Paschke; Markus Eisenbichler	Slovenia Lovro Kos; Domen Prevc; Timi Zajc; Anže Lanišek	

Raw Air 2025 (part of)
Planica7 (2025) (part of)

== Standings ==
=== Men's ski flying ===
Rank	after 6 events	Points
	(Slovenia) Domen Prevc	485
2	(Slovenia) Anže Lanišek	317
3	(Germany) Andreas Wellinger	310
4	(Japan) Ryōyū Kobayashi	280
5	(Slovenia) Timi Zajc	268
6	(Austria) Daniel Tschofenig	224
7	(Austria) Jan Hörl	200
8	(Austria) Stefan Kraft	185
9	(Switzerland) Gregor Deschwanden	165
10	(Germany) Karl Geiger	162

=== Women's ski flying ===
Rank	after 1 event	Points
1	no final standings and no crystal globe awarded (as only 1 event was held)
2	no final standings and no crystal globe awarded (as only 1 event was held)
3	no final standings and no crystal globe awarded (as only 1 event was held)
4	no final standings and no crystal globe awarded (as only 1 event was held)
5	no final standings and no crystal globe awarded (as only 1 event was held)
6	no final standings and no crystal globe awarded (as only 1 event was held)
7	no final standings and no crystal globe awarded (as only 1 event was held)
8	no final standings and no crystal globe awarded (as only 1 event was held)
9	no final standings and no crystal globe awarded (as only 1 event was held)
10	no final standings and no crystal globe awarded (as only 1 event was held)
