= 2022–23 FIS Ski Flying World Cup =

FIS Ski Flying World Cup 2022/23
Winners
- Overall: (Austria) Stefan Kraft

Competitions
- Venues: 3
- Individual: 6
- Team: 1

The 2022–23 FIS Ski Flying World Cup was the 26th official World Cup season in ski flying. The winner was awarded with small crystal globe as the subdiscipline of FIS Ski Jumping World Cup.

== Map of World Cup hosts ==
(Austria) Bad Mitterndorf	(Norway) Vikersund	(Slovenia) Planica
Kulm	Vikersundbakken	Letalnica bratov Gorišek
Europe

== World records ==
List of world record distances achieved within this World Cup season.

Date	Athlete	Hill	Round	Place	Metres	Feet
Women
18 March 2023	(Slovenia) Ema Klinec	Vikersundbakken HS240	Training – R2	Vikersund, Norway	203	666
18 March 2023	(Norway) Maren Lundby	Vikersundbakken HS240	Training – R3	Vikersund, Norway	212.5	697
18 March 2023	(Canada) Alexandria Loutitt	Vikersundbakken HS240	Training – R3	Vikersund, Norway	222	728
19 March 2023	(Slovenia) Ema Klinec	Vikersundbakken HS240	Round 1	Vikersund, Norway	226	741

== Calendar ==
=== Men's Individual ===
All	No.	Date	Place (Hill)	Size	Winner	Second	Third	Ski flying leader	R.
1072	1	28 January 2023	(Austria) Bad Mitterndorf (Kulm HS235)	F _{135}	(Norway) Halvor Egner Granerud	(Austria) Stefan Kraft	(Slovenia) Domen Prevc	(Norway) Halvor Egner Granerud	
1073	2	29 January 2023	(Austria) Bad Mitterndorf (Kulm HS235)	F _{136}	(Norway) Halvor Egner Granerud	(Slovenia) Timi Zajc	(Austria) Stefan Kraft	(Norway) Halvor Egner Granerud	
prologue		17 March 2023	(Norway) Vikersund (Vikersundbakken HS240)	F _{Qro}	(Austria) Stefan Kraft	(Austria) Michael Hayböck	(Norway) Halvor Egner Granerud	—	
1083	3	18 March 2023	(Norway) Vikersund (Vikersundbakken HS240)	F _{137}	(Norway) Halvor Egner Granerud	(Austria) Stefan Kraft	(Austria) Daniel Tschofenig	(Norway) Halvor Egner Granerud	
prologue		19 March 2023	(Norway) Vikersund (Vikersundbakken HS240)	F _{Qro}	(Austria) Stefan Kraft	(Norway) Halvor Egner Granerud (Norway) Robert Johansson		—	
1084	4	19 March 2023	(Norway) Vikersund (Vikersundbakken HS240)	F _{138}	(Austria) Stefan Kraft	(Norway) Halvor Egner Granerud	(Slovenia) Anže Lanišek	(Norway) Halvor Egner Granerud	
qualifying		30 March 2023	(Slovenia) Planica (Letalnica b. Gorišek HS240)	F _{Qro}	(Slovenia) Anže Lanišek	(Slovenia) Timi Zajc	(Slovenia) Domen Prevc	—	
		31 March 2023	(Slovenia) Planica (Letalnica b. Gorišek HS240)	F _{cnx}	cancelled due to strong wind and rescheduled to 1 April			—	
1086	5	(Note: Men's individual event in Planica (31 March) was rescheduled to 1 April due to strong wind. Only 1 round held due to delayed competition.)1 April 2023	(Slovenia) Planica (Letalnica b. Gorišek HS240)	F _{139}	(Austria) Stefan Kraft	(Slovenia) Anže Lanišek	(Poland) Piotr Żyła	(Norway) Halvor Egner Granerud	
team		1 April 2023	(Slovenia) Planica (Letalnica b. Gorišek HS240)	F _{Tev}	(Austria) Stefan Kraft	(Norway) Halvor Egner Granerud	(Slovenia) Timi Zajc	—	
1087	6	2 April 2023	(Slovenia) Planica (Letalnica b. Gorišek HS240)	F _{140}	(Slovenia) Timi Zajc	(Slovenia) Anže Lanišek	(Austria) Stefan Kraft	(Austria) Stefan Kraft	
5th Planica7 Overall (30 March – 2 April 2023)					(Austria) Stefan Kraft	(Slovenia) Anže Lanišek	(Slovenia) Timi Zajc	Planica7	
26th FIS Ski Flying Men's Overall (28 January – 2 April 2023)					(Austria) Stefan Kraft	(Norway) Halvor Egner Granerud	(Slovenia) Anže Lanišek	Ski Flying Overall	

=== Women's Individual ===
First ever official women's ski flying competition (FIS event). Which did not count for World Cup.

All	No.	Date	Place (Hill)	Size	Winner	Second	Third	Overall leader	R.
FIS		(Note: Women's individual ski flying event in Vikersund (19 March) did not count for World Cup (categorized as FIS competition).)19 March 2023	(Norway) Vikersund (Vikersundbakken HS240)	F _{FIS}	(Slovenia) Ema Klinec	(Norway) Silje Opseth	(Japan) Yūki Itō	—	

=== Men's team ===
All	No.	Date	Place (Hill)	Size	Winner	Second	Third	R.
119	1	1 April 2023	(Slovenia) Planica (Letalnica bratov Gorišek HS240)	F _{026}	Austria Daniel Tschofenig; Michael Hayböck; Jan Hörl; Stefan Kraft	Slovenia Lovro Kos; Domen Prevc; Timi Zajc; Anže Lanišek	Norway Johann André Forfang; Bendik Jakobsen Heggli; Robert Johansson; Halvor Egner Granerud	

Raw Air 2023 (part of)
Planica7 (2023) (part of)

== Standings ==
=== Ski Flying ===
Rank	after 6 events	Points
	(Austria) Stefan Kraft	480
2	(Norway) Halvor Egner Granerud	450
3	(Slovenia) Anže Lanišek	314
4	(Slovenia) Timi Zajc	311
5	(Slovenia) Domen Prevc	237
6	(Austria) Jan Hörl	213
7	(Poland) Piotr Żyła	210
8	(Japan) Ryōyū Kobayashi	164
9	(Germany) Andreas Wellinger	161
10	(Austria) Daniel Tschofenig	140
