= 2025–26 FIS Ski Flying World Cup =

Annual ski flying competition season

| Discipline | Men | Women |
| Overall | (Slovenia) Domen Prevc | (Norway) Eirin Maria Kvandal |

Competition
| Edition | 29th | 1st |
| Locations | 3 | 2 |
| Individual | 5 | 3 |
| Team | 1 | – |
| Cancelled | 1 | – |

The 2025–26 FIS Ski Flying World Cup will be the 29th men's official World Cup season in ski flying and the 1st women's official ski flying season for women awarded with small crystal globe.

FIS Ski Flying World Cup is a subdisciple of Ski Jumping World Cup.

Overall ski flying leader and winner will be wearing red jersey.

== Map of World Cup hosts ==
| (Austria) Bad Mitterndorf | (Norway) Vikersund | (Slovenia) Planica |
|---|---|---|
| Kulm | Vikersundbakken | Letalnica bratov Gorišek |
Europe

== Calendar ==
=== Men's Individual ===
| All | No. | Date | Place (Hill) | Size | Winner | Second | Third | Overall leader | R. |
|---|---|---|---|---|---|---|---|---|---|
FIS Ski Flying World Championships 2026 (23 – 24 January • (Germany) Oberstdorf )
| 1169 | 1 | 28 February 2026 | (Austria) Bad Mitterndorf (Kulm HS235) | F _{153} | (Slovenia) Domen Prevc | (Austria) Stephan Embacher | (Austria) Jonas Schuster | (Slovenia) Domen Prevc | |
| 1170 | 2 | 1 March 2026 | (Austria) Bad Mitterndorf (Kulm HS235) | F _{154} | (Slovenia) Domen Prevc | (Austria) Stephan Embacher | (Norway) Johann André Forfang | (Slovenia) Domen Prevc | |
| 1175 | 3 | 21 March 2026 | (Norway) Vikersund (Vikersundbakken HS240) | F _{155} | (Austria) Stephan Embacher | (Japan) Tomofumi Naitō | (Norway) Johann André Forfang | (Austria) Stephan Embacher | |
| — | | 22 March 2026 | (Norway) Vikersund (Vikersundbakken HS240) | F _{cnx} | cancelled due to strong wind | | | — | |
| qualifying | | 26 March 2026 | (Slovenia) Planica (Letalnica b. Gorišek HS240) | F _{Qro} | (Slovenia) Anže Lanišek | (Slovenia) Domen Prevc | (Austria) Stephan Embacher | — | — |
| 1175 | 5 | 27 March 2026 | (Slovenia) Planica (Letalnica b. Gorišek HS240) | F _{156} | (Slovenia) Domen Prevc | (Japan) Ren Nikaido | (Austria) Daniel Tschofenig | (Slovenia) Domen Prevc | |
| team | | 28 March 2026 | (Slovenia) Planica (Letalnica b. Gorišek HS240) | F _{T} | Austria | Japan | Norway | — | |
| 1176 | 6 | 29 March 2026 | (Slovenia) Planica (Letalnica b. Gorišek HS240) | F _{157} | | | | | |
| 8th Planica7 Overall (26 – 29 March 2026) | | | | | | | | Planica7 | |
| 29th FIS Ski Flying Men's Overall (28 February – 29 March 2026) | | | | | | | | Ski Flying Overall | |

=== Women's Individual ===
| All | No. | Date | Place (Hill) | Size | Winner | Second | Third | Overall leader | R. |
|---|---|---|---|---|---|---|---|---|---|
| 288 | 1 | 21 March 2026 | (Norway) Vikersund (Vikersundbakken HS240) | F _{003} | (Norway) Eirin Maria Kvandal | (Sweden) Frida Westman | (Slovenia) Nika Prevc | (Norway) Eirin Maria Kvandal | |
| 289 | 2 | 22 March 2026 | (Norway) Vikersund (Vikersundbakken HS240) | F _{004} | (Norway) Eirin Maria Kvandal | (Slovenia) Nika Prevc | (Norway) Anna Odine Strøm | (Norway) Eirin Maria Kvandal | |
| 290 | 3 | 28 March 2026 | (Slovenia) Planica (Letalnica b. Gorišek HS240) | F _{005} | | | | | |
| 1st FIS Ski Flying Women's Overall (21 – 28 March 2026) | | | | | | | | Ski Flying Overall | |

=== Men's team ===
| All | No. | Date | Place (Hill) | Size | Winner | Second | Third | R. |
|---|---|---|---|---|---|---|---|---|
| 126 | 1 | 28 March 2026 | (Slovenia) Planica (Letalnica b. Gorišek HS240) | F _{029} | | | | |

Planica7 (2026) (part of)

== Standings ==
=== Men's ski flying ===
| Rank | after 4 of 5 events | Points |
|---|---|---|
| 1 | (Slovenia) Domen Prevc | 345 |
| 2 | (Austria) Stephan Embacher | 284 |
| 3 | (Norway) Johann André Forfang | 190 |
| 4 | (Japan) Tomofumi Naitō | 143 |
| 5 | (Germany) Andreas Wellinger | 142 |
| 6 | (Austria) Daniel Tschofenig | 134 |
| 7 | (Norway) Marius Lindvik | 111 |
| | (Finland) Antti Aalto | 111 |
| 9 | (Japan) Naoki Nakamura | 110 |
| 10 | (Austria) Jonas Schuster | 103 |

=== Women's ski flying ===
| Rank | after 2 of 3 events | Points |
|---|---|---|
| 1 | (Norway) Eirin Maria Kvandal | 200 |
| 2 | (Slovenia) Nika Prevc | 140 |
| 3 | (Sweden) Frida Westman | 130 |
| 4 | (Norway) Anna Odine Strøm | 105 |
| 5 | (Slovenia) Nika Vodan | 95 |
| 6 | (Norway) Silje Opseth | 80 |
| 7 | (Japan) Yūki Itō | 66 |
| 8 | (Norway) Ingvild Synnøve Midtskogen | 61 |
| | (Finland) Jenny Rautionaho | 61 |
| 10 | (Norway) Gyda Westvold Hansen | 47 |
