= 2018–19 FIS Ski Flying World Cup =

FIS Ski Flying World Cup 2018/19
Winners
- Overall: (Japan) Ryōyū Kobayashi

Competitions
- Venues: 3
- Individual: 6
- Team: 2

The 2018–19 FIS Ski Flying World Cup was the 22nd official World Cup season in ski flying. Winner was awarded with small crystal globe as the subdiscipline of FIS Ski Jumping World Cup.

== Map of World Cup hosts ==
(Germany) Oberstdorf	(Norway) Vikersund	(Slovenia) Planica
Heini-Klopfer	Vikersundbakken	Letalnica bratov Gorišek
Europe

== Calendar ==
=== Men's Individual ===
All	No.	Date	Place (Hill)	Size	Winner	Second	Third	Ski flying leader	R.
964	1	(Note: Individual cancelled men's LH event from Titisee-Neustadt (9 December) was rescheduled to Oberstdorf (1 February) as individual ski flying event.)1 February 2019	(Germany) Oberstdorf (Heini-Klopfer HS235)	F _{120}	(Slovenia) Timi Zajc	(Poland) Dawid Kubacki	(Germany) Markus Eisenbichler	(Slovenia) Timi Zajc	
965	2	2 February 2019	(Germany) Oberstdorf (Heini-Klopfer HS235)	F _{121}	(Japan) Ryōyū Kobayashi	(Germany) Markus Eisenbichler	(Austria) Stefan Kraft	(Germany) Markus Eisenbichler	
966	3	3 February 2019	(Germany) Oberstdorf (Heini-Klopfer HS235)	F _{122}	(Poland) Kamil Stoch	(Russia) Evgeniy Klimov	(Poland) Dawid Kubacki	(Poland) Kamil Stoch	
prologue		15 March 2019	(Norway) Vikersund (Vikersundbakken HS240)	F _{Qro}	(Japan) Ryōyū Kobayashi	(Austria) Stefan Kraft	(Germany) Markus Eisenbichler	—	
team		16 March 2019	(Norway) Vikersund (Vikersundbakken HS240)	F _{T}	(Slovenia) Domen Prevc	(Austria) Stefan Kraft	(Japan) Ryōyū Kobayashi	—	
973	4	17 March 2019	(Norway) Vikersund (Vikersundbakken HS240)	F _{123}	(Slovenia) Domen Prevc	(Japan) Ryōyū Kobayashi	(Austria) Stefan Kraft	(Japan) Ryōyū Kobayashi	
qualifying		21 March 2019	(Slovenia) Planica (Letalnica b. Gorišek HS240)	F _{Qro}	(Japan) Ryōyū Kobayashi	(Germany) Markus Eisenbichler	(Slovenia) Timi Zajc	—	
974	5	22 March 2019	(Slovenia) Planica (Letalnica b. Gorišek HS240)	F _{124}	(Germany) Markus Eisenbichler	(Japan) Ryōyū Kobayashi	(Poland) Piotr Żyła	(Germany) Markus Eisenbichler	
team		23 March 2019	(Slovenia) Planica (Letalnica b. Gorišek HS240)	F _{T}	(Japan) Ryōyū Kobayashi	(Germany) Markus Eisenbichler	(Slovenia) Timi Zajc	—	
975	6	24 March 2019	(Slovenia) Planica (Letalnica b. Gorišek HS240)	F _{125}	(Japan) Ryōyū Kobayashi	(Slovenia) Domen Prevc	(Germany) Markus Eisenbichler	(Japan) Ryōyū Kobayashi	
2nd Planica7 Overall (21 – 24 March 2019)					(Japan) Ryōyū Kobayashi	(Germany) Markus Eisenbichler	(Slovenia) Timi Zajc	Planica7	
22nd FIS Ski Flying Men's Overall (1 February – 24 March 2019)					(Japan) Ryōyū Kobayashi	(Germany) Markus Eisenbichler	(Poland) Piotr Żyła	Ski Flying Overall	

=== Men's team ===
All	No.	Date	Place (Hill)	Size	Winner	Second	Third	R.
101	1	16 March 2019	(Norway) Vikersund (Vikersundbakken HS240)	F _{022}	Slovenia Anže Semenič; Peter Prevc; Domen Prevc; Timi Zajc	Germany Constantin Schmid; Richard Freitag; Karl Geiger; Markus Eisenbichler	Austria Michael Hayböck; Philipp Aschenwald; Daniel Huber; Stefan Kraft	
102	2	23 March 2019	(Slovenia) Planica (Letalnica bratov Gorišek HS240)	F _{023}	Poland Jakub Wolny; Kamil Stoch; Dawid Kubacki; Piotr Żyła	Germany Karl Geiger; Constantin Schmid; Richard Freitag; Markus Eisenbichler	Slovenia Anže Semenič; Peter Prevc; Domen Prevc; Timi Zajc	

Raw Air 2019 (part of)
Planica7 (2019) (part of)

== Standings ==
=== Ski Flying ===
Rank	after 6 events	01/02/2019 Oberstdorf	02/02/2019 Oberstdorf	03/02/2019 Oberstdorf	17/03/2019 Vikersund	22/03/2019 Planica	24/03/2019 Planica	Total
	(Japan) Ryōyū Kobayashi	18	100	29	80	80	100	407
2	(Germany) Markus Eisenbichler	60	80	26	45	100	60	371
3	(Poland) Piotr Żyła	50	50	50	29	60	50	289
4	(Slovenia) Domen Prevc	11	20	15	100	45	80	271
5	(Poland) Dawid Kubacki	80	9	60	26	36	40	251
6	(Slovenia) Timi Zajc	100	29	20	6	50	45	250
7	(Poland) Kamil Stoch	45	40	100	22	13	24	244
8	(Austria) Stefan Kraft	40	60	36	60	18	14	228
9	(Norway) Johann André Forfang	36	32	32	36	32	32	200
10	(Russia) Evgeniy Klimov	32	45	80	18	24	26	158
