= 2021–22 FIS Ski Flying World Cup =

International skiing competition

FIS Ski Flying World Cup 2021/22
Winners
- Overall: (Slovenia) Žiga Jelar

Competitions
- Venues: 2
- Individual: 4
- Team: 1

The 2021–22 FIS Ski Flying World Cup was the 25th official World Cup season in ski flying. The winner was awarded with small crystal globe as the subdiscipline of FIS Ski Jumping World Cup.

== Map of World Cup hosts ==
(Germany) Oberstdorf	(Slovenia) Planica
Heini-Klopfer	Letalnica bratov Gorišek
Europe

== Calendar ==
=== Men's Individual ===
All	No.	Date	Place (Hill)	Size	Winner	Second	Third	Ski flying leader	R.
FIS Ski Flying World Championships 2022 (11 – 12 March • (Norway) Vikersund)
1052	1	19 March 2022	(Germany) Oberstdorf (Heini-Klopfer HS235)	F _{131}	(Austria) Stefan Kraft	(Slovenia) Žiga Jelar	(Slovenia) Timi Zajc	(Austria) Stefan Kraft	
1053	2	20 March 2022	(Germany) Oberstdorf (Heini-Klopfer HS235)	F _{132}	(Slovenia) Timi Zajc	(Poland) Piotr Żyła	(Austria) Stefan Kraft	(Austria) Stefan Kraft (Slovenia) Timi Zajc	
qualifying		24 March 2022	(Slovenia) Planica (Letalnica b. Gorišek HS240)	F _{Qro}	(Slovenia) Anže Lanišek	(Slovenia) Timi Zajc	(Norway) Johann André Forfang	—	
1054	3	25 March 2022	(Slovenia) Planica (Letalnica b. Gorišek HS240)	F _{133}	(Slovenia) Žiga Jelar	(Slovenia) Peter Prevc	(Slovenia) Anže Lanišek	(Slovenia) Žiga Jelar	
team		26 March 2022	(Slovenia) Planica (Letalnica b. Gorišek HS240)	F _{Tev}	(Norway) Marius Lindvik	(Slovenia) Timi Zajc	(Austria) Stefan Kraft	—	
1055	4	27 March 2022	(Slovenia) Planica (Letalnica b. Gorišek HS240)	F _{134}	(Norway) Marius Lindvik	(Japan) Yukiya Satō	(Slovenia) Peter Prevc	(Slovenia) Žiga Jelar	
4th Planica7 Overall (24 – 27 March 2022)					(Slovenia) Timi Zajc	(Norway) Marius Lindvik	(Slovenia) Peter Prevc	Planica7	
25th FIS Ski Flying Men's Overall (19 – 27 March 2022)					(Slovenia) Žiga Jelar	(Slovenia) Timi Zajc	(Austria) Stefan Kraft	Ski Flying Overall	

=== Men's team ===
All	No.	Date	Place (Hill)	Size	Winner	Second	Third	R.
116	1	26 March 2022	(Slovenia) Planica (Letalnica bratov Gorišek HS240	F _{025}	Slovenia Žiga Jelar; Peter Prevc; Timi Zajc; Anže Lanišek	Norway Marius Lindvik; Bendik Jakobsen Heggli; Johann André Forfang; Halvor Egner Granerud	Austria Michael Hayböck; Daniel Tschofenig; Manuel Fettner; Stefan Kraft	

Planica7 (2022) (part of)

== Standings ==
=== Ski Flying ===
Rank	after 4 events	Points
	(Slovenia) Žiga Jelar	270
2	(Slovenia) Timi Zajc	260
3	(Austria) Stefan Kraft	224
4	(Slovenia) Peter Prevc	194
5	(Slovenia) Anže Lanišek	171
6	(Norway) Marius Lindvik	160
	(Poland) Piotr Żyła	160
8	(Japan) Yukiya Satō	150
9	(Japan) Ryōyū Kobayashi	143
10	(Germany) Karl Geiger	95
