= 1993–94 FIS Ski Flying World Cup =

FIS Ski Flying World Cup 1993/94
Winners
- Overall: (Czech Republic) Jaroslav Sakala
- Nations Cup (unofficial): Norway

Competitions
- Venues: 1
- Individual: 1
- Cancelled: 1

The 1993/94 FIS Ski Flying World Cup was the 4th official World Cup season in ski flying awarded with small crystal globe as the subdiscipline of FIS Ski Jumping World Cup.

== Map of World Cup hosts ==
(Slovenia) Planica
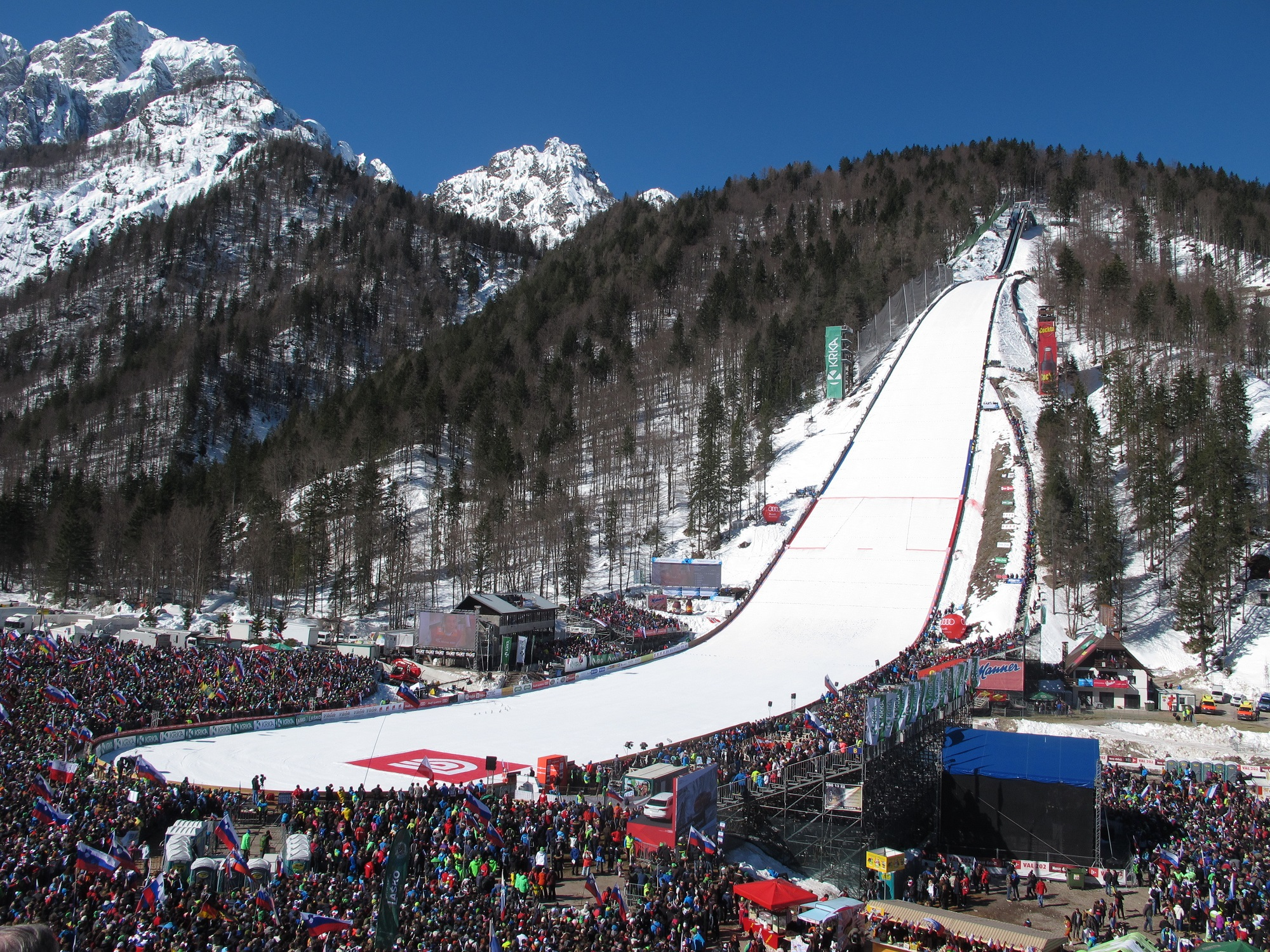
Velikanka bratov Gorišek

Europe

== World records ==
List of world record distances (both official and invalid) achieved within this World Cup season.

| Date | Athlete | Hill | Round | Place | Metres | Feet |
|---|---|---|---|---|---|---|
| 17 March 1994 | (Austria) Martin Höllwarth | Velikanka bratov Gorišek K185 | V – jumper | Planica, Slovenia | 196 | 643 |
| 17 March 1994 | (Austria) Andreas Goldberger | Velikanka bratov Gorišek K185 | Training – R1 | Planica, Slovenia | 202 | 663 |
| 17 March 1994 | (Finland) Toni Nieminen | Velikanka bratov Gorišek K185 | Training – R1 | Planica, Slovenia | 203 | 666 |
| 18 March 1994 | (Germany) Christof Duffner | Velikanka bratov Gorišek K185 | Training2 – R1 | Planica, Slovenia | 207 | 679 |
| 18 March 1994 | (Norway) Espen Bredesen | Velikanka bratov Gorišek K185 | Training2 – R1 | Planica, Slovenia | 209 | 686 |

Longest jump in history at that time, but invalid due to Goldberger (touch) and Duffner (falling) upon landing.

== Calendar ==
=== Men's Individual ===
| All | No. | Date | Place (Hill) | Size | Winner | Second | Third | Ski flying leader | R. |
|---|---|---|---|---|---|---|---|---|---|
FIS World Cup 1993/94 = FIS Ski Flying World Championships 1994 (19 – 20 March • Planica)
| | | 19 March 1994 | (Slovenia) Planica (Velikanka bratov Gorišek K185) | F _{cnx} | first day of FIS SFWC = FIS WC cancelled de to strong wind | | | — | |
| 330 | 1 | 20 March 1994 | (Slovenia) Planica (Velikanka bratov Gorišek K185) | F _{027} | (Czech Republic) Jaroslav Sakala | (Norway) Espen Bredesen | (Italy) Roberto Cecon | (Czech Republic) Jaroslav Sakala | |
| 4th FIS Ski Flying Men's Overall (20 March 1994) | | | | | (Czech Republic) Jaroslav Sakala | (Norway) Espen Bredesen | (Italy) Roberto Cecon | Ski Flying Overall | |

FIS Ski Jumping World Cup / FIS Ski Flying World Cup / FIS Ski Flying World Championships

== Standings ==
Points were for the first time distributed by new scoring system.

=== Ski Flying ===
| Rank | after 1 event | 20/03/1994 Planica | Total |
|---|---|---|---|
| | (Czech Republic) Jaroslav Sakala | 100 | 100 |
| 2 | (Norway) Espen Bredesen | 80 | 80 |
| 3 | (Italy) Roberto Cecon | 60 | 60 |
| 4 | (Germany) Christof Duffner | 50 | 50 |
| 5 | (Norway) Lasse Ottesen | 45 | 45 |
| 6 | (Switzerland) Stephan Zünd | 40 | 40 |
| 7 | (Finland) Toni Nieminen | 36 | 36 |
| 8 | (Norway) Kurt Børset | 32 | 32 |
| 9 | (Finland) Jani Soininen | 29 | 29 |
| 10 | (Germany) Hansjörg Jäkle | 26 | 26 |
| 11 | (Japan) Takanobu Okabe | 24 | 24 |
| 12 | (Finland) Janne Ahonen | 22 | 22 |
| 13 | (Austria) Andreas Goldberger | 20 | 20 |
| 14 | (Finland) Janne Väätäinen | 18 | 18 |
| 15 | (Switzerland) Sylvain Freiholz | 16 | 16 |
| 16 | (Austria) Werner Haim | 15 | 15 |
| 17 | (Italy) Ivo Pertile | 14 | 14 |
| 18 | (United States) Ted Langlois | 13 | 13 |
| 19 | (Japan) Noriaki Kasai | 12 | 12 |
| 20 | (France) Nicolas Jean-Prost | 11 | 11 |
| 21 | (Czech Republic) Tomáš Goder | 10 | 10 |
| 22 | (Japan) Jinya Nishikata | 9 | 9 |
| 23 | (Switzerland) Sepp Zehnder | 8 | 8 |
| 24 | (Austria) Werner Rathmayr | 7 | 7 |
| 25 | (Switzerland) Bruno Reuteler | 6 | 6 |
| 26 | (Germany) Gerd Siegmund | 5 | 5 |
| 27 | (Czech Republic) Jakub Sucháček | 4 | 4 |
| 28 | (Slovenia) Matjaž Zupan | 3 | 3 |
| 29 | (France) Didier Mollard | 2 | 2 |
| 30 | (Slovenia) Matjaž Kladnik | 1 | 1 |

=== Nations Cup (unofficial) ===
| Rank | after 1 event | Points |
|---|---|---|
| 1 | Norway | 157 |
| 2 | Czech Republic | 114 |
| 3 | Finland | 105 |
| 4 | Germany | 81 |
| 5 | Italy | 74 |
| 6 | Switzerland | 70 |
| 7 | Japan | 45 |
| 8 | United States | 13 |
| 9 | France | 13 |
| 10 | Slovenia | 4 |
