= 2019–20 FIS Ski Flying World Cup =

FIS Ski Flying World Cup 2019/20
Winners
- Overall: (Austria) Stefan Kraft

Competitions
- Venues: 1
- Individual: 2
- Cancelled: 1 Individual + 1 Team

The 2019–20 FIS Ski Flying World Cup is the 23rd official World Cup season in ski flying. The winner was awarded with small crystal globe as the subdiscipline of FIS Ski Jumping World Cup.

== Map of World Cup hosts ==
(Austria) Bad Mitterndorf	(Norway) ~~Vikersund~~
Kulm	~~Vikersundbakken~~
Europe

== Calendar ==
=== Men's Individual ===
All	No.	Date	Place (Hill)	Size	Winner	Second	Third	Ski flying leader	R.
995	1	15 February 2020	(Austria) Bad Mitterndorf (Kulm HS235	F _{126}	(Poland) Piotr Żyła	(Slovenia) Timi Zajc	(Austria) Stefan Kraft	(Poland) Piotr Żyła	
996	2	16 February 2020	(Austria) Bad Mitterndorf (Kulm HS235	F _{127}	(Austria) Stefan Kraft	(Japan) Ryōyū Kobayashi	(Slovenia) Timi Zajc	(Austria) Stefan Kraft	
prologue		13 March 2020	(Norway) Vikersund (Vikersundbakken HS240)	F _{Qro}	cancelled due to the COVID-19 pandemic			—	
team		14 March 2020	(Norway) Vikersund (Vikersundbakken HS240)	F _{T}	cancelled due to the COVID-19 pandemic			—	
		15 March 2020	(Norway) Vikersund (Vikersundbakken HS240)	F _{cnx}	cancelled due to the COVID-19 pandemic			—	
23rd FIS Ski Flying Men's Overall (15 – 16 February 2020)					(Austria) Stefan Kraft	(Slovenia) Timi Zajc	(Poland) Piotr Żyła	Ski Flying Overall	
FIS Ski Flying World Championships 2020 (planned from 20 – 21 March, but cancelled due to COVID-19 pandemic; rescheduled on 11 – 12 December • (Slovenia) Planica)

=== Men's team ===
All	No.	Date	Place (Hill)	Size	Winner	Second	Third	R.
		14 March 2020	(Norway) Vikersund (Vikersundbakken HS240)	F _{cnx}	cancelled due to the COVID-19 pandemic			

Raw Air 2020 (part of)

== Standings ==
=== Ski Flying ===
Rank	after 2 events	15/02/2020 Kulm	16/02/2020 Kulm	Total
	(Austria) Stefan Kraft	60	100	160
2	(Slovenia) Timi Zajc	80	60	140
3	(Poland) Piotr Żyła	100	29	129
4	(Japan) Ryōyū Kobayashi	29	80	109
5	(Germany) Karl Geiger	50	40	90
6	(Poland) Kamil Stoch	36	50	86
7	(Finland) Antti Aalto	40	24	64
	(Norway) Robert Johansson	32	32	64
9	(Slovenia) Domen Prevc	6	45	51
	(Norway) Johann André Forfang	35	16	51
