= 2013–14 FIS Ski Flying World Cup =

FIS Ski Flying World Cup 2013/14
Winners
- Overall: (Slovenia) Peter Prevc
- Nations Cup unofficial: Slovenia

Competitions
- Venues: 1
- Individual: 2

The 2013/14 FIS Ski Flying World Cup was the 17th official World Cup season in ski flying awarded with small crystal globe as the subdiscipline of FIS Ski Jumping World Cup.

== Map of World Cup hosts ==
(Austria) Bad Mitterndorf
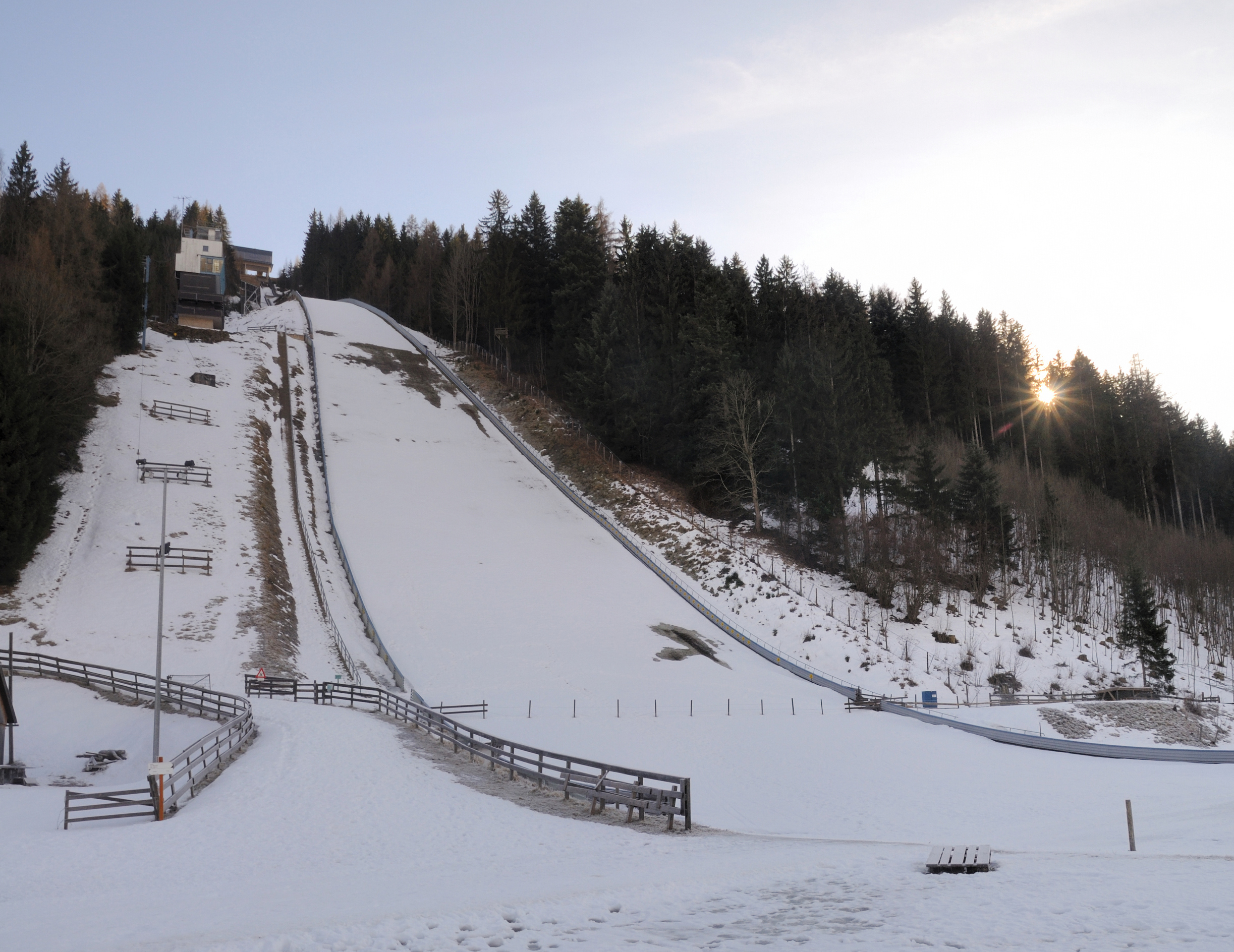
Kulm

Europe

== Calendar ==
=== Men ===
All	No.	Date	Place (Hill)	Size	Winner	Second	Third	Ski flying leader	R.
824	1	11 January 2014	(Austria) Bad Mitterndorf (Kulm HS200)	F _{098}	(Japan) Noriaki Kasai	(Slovenia) Peter Prevc	(Austria) Gregor Schlierenzauer	(Japan) Noriaki Kasai	
825	2	12 January 2014	(Austria) Bad Mitterndorf (Kulm HS200)	F _{099}	(Slovenia) Peter Prevc	(Austria) Gregor Schlierenzauer	(Japan) Noriaki Kasai	(Slovenia) Peter Prevc	
17th FIS Ski Flying Men's Overall (11 – 12 January 2014)					(Slovenia) Peter Prevc	(Japan) Noriaki Kasai	(Austria) Gregor Schlierenzauer	Ski Flying Overall	
FIS Ski Flying World Championships 2014 (14 March • (Czech Republic) Harrachov)

== Standings ==
=== Ski Flying ===
Rank	after 2 events	11/01/2014 Kulm	12/01/2014 Kulm	Total
	(Slovenia) Peter Prevc	80	100	180
2	(Japan) Noriaki Kasai	100	60	160
3	(Austria) Gregor Schlierenzauer	60	80	140
4	(Switzerland) Simon Ammann	24	50	74
5	(Slovenia) Jurij Tepeš	50	22	72
	(Germany) Severin Freund	36	36	72
7	(Poland) Kamil Stoch	40	29	69
8	(Czech Republic) Jan Matura	20	40	60
9	(Slovenia) Robert Kranjec	45	13	58
10	(Norway) Anders Fannemel	11	45	56
11	(Austria) Manuel Poppinger	22	32	54
12	(Germany) Andreas Wellinger	32	12	44
	(Austria) Wolfgang Loitzl	20	24	44
14	(Austria) Michael Hayböck	26	15	41
15	(Poland) Maciej Kot	12	26	38
16	(Canada) MacKenzie Boyd-Clowes	29	0	29
17	(Germany) Marinus Kraus	15	11	26
18	(Norway) Rune Velta	5	20	25
19	(Poland) Piotr Żyła	16	7	23
20	(Czech Republic) Antonín Hájek	10	9	19
21	(Slovenia) Jernej Damjan	0	18	18
22	(Austria) Martin Koch	13	3	16
	(Norway) Daniel-André Tande	0	16	16
24	(Poland) Jan Ziobro	14	1	15
25	(Czech Republic) Jakub Janda	0	14	14
26	(Slovenia) Jaka Hvala	7	6	13
27	(Germany) Michael Neumayer	3	8	11
	(Czech Republic) Lukáš Hlava	9	2	11
29	(Austria) Stefan Kraft	0	10	10
30	(Japan) Yūta Watase	8	—	8
31	(Switzerland) Gregor Deschwanden	2	5	7
32	(Germany) Andreas Wank	6	0	6
33	(Finland) Jarkko Määttä	4	0	4
	(Poland) Klemens Murańka	DSQ	4	4
35	(Slovenia) Tomaž Naglič	1	0	1

=== Nations Cup (unofficial) ===
Rank	after 2 events	Points
1	Slovenia	342
2	Austria	305
3	Japan	168
4	Germany	159
5	Poland	149
6	Norway	97
7	Czech Republic	90
8	Switzerland	81
9	Canada	29
10	Finland	4
