= Matjaž Zupan =

Slovenian ski jumper (born 1968)

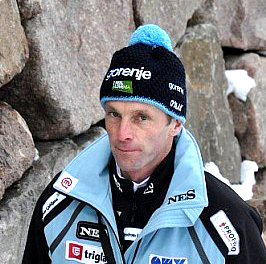
- Zupan in 2011

Personal information
- Born: 27 September 1968 (age 57) Kranj, SR Slovenia, SFR Yugoslavia
Medal record
Men's ski jumping
Representing Yugoslavia
Olympic Games
Silver medal – second place	1988 Calgary	Team large hill

Matjaž Zupan (born 27 September 1968 in Kranj) is a Slovenian former ski jumper who competed for the former Yugoslavia and afterwards for independent Slovenia from 1987 to 1994. He won a silver medal in the team large hill competition at the 1988 Winter Olympics in Calgary.

His best finish at the FIS Nordic World Ski Championships was 4th in the individual large hill event in 1987.

After his jumping days were over he a started successful coaching career. He was the coach of the Slovenian national ski jumping team from 1999 to 2006. His biggest successes were when Rok Benkovič won the normal hill at the World Championship in Oberstdorf and also the bronze medal in the same competition with the Slovenian team. In 2002 he launched the Slovenian Eagles to the team bronze in the Olympic games in Salt Lake City. After 2006 he quit his post as a coach and was replaced by Vasja Bajc. He took over the Czech national team and stayed there for three successful seasons. After that he quit so he could once again became head coach for his beloved Slovenia. His tenure was between 2007 and 2011. The second time the results were not so good and he was replaced with the most successful coach in Slovenian ski jumping history - Goran Janus who was his former jumper. In 2011 he became coach for the French ski jumping national team. He coached them for two years with moderate success, until the end of the 2014 Olympic cycle. On 24 May it was announced that he had become the new head coach of the Russian national ski jumping team and their new ambitious program to launch Russia among the best ski jumping nations. He chose his countryman Matjaž Triplat as his assistant. Matjaž Triplat was former head coach of the Slovenian women's ski jumping team.

He was engaged by the Bulgarian Olympic Committee as coach of Ski jumping team of Bulgaria for the 2018 Winter Olympics games.

== Family ==
He currently resides with his wife, Birgette in Cheltenham, England. He also has 2 children.
