= Planica7 =

Ski flying tournament in Slovenia

- Genre: ski flying
- Location: (Slovenia) Planica (7 rounds)
- Inaugurated: 22 March 2018
- Organiser: Planica organizing committee & International Ski Federation

Planica7 is a four-day tournament in ski flying at Letalnica bratov Gorišek in Planica, Slovenia. It is organized as part of the FIS World Cup.

== Competition ==
=== Prize money ===
The competition will have prize money 20,000 CHF for the overall winner.

=== Format ===
The competition will last for four days in a row, with no break and 4 events with total of 7 rounds from individual events, team event and qualification round:

	Events	Rounds
Individual	2	4 (2x2)
Qualification round	1	1 (1x1)
Team	1	2 (1x2)
Total	4	7

== Host ==
=== Map ===
Planica7 (Slovenia)

=== Hill record ===
Image	Name	Location	Hill record
	Letalnica bratov Gorišek	Planica	254.5 metres (835 ft) (Slovenia) Domen Prevc

== Edition ==
Year	Date	Winner	Second	Third
2018	22–25 March	(Poland) Kamil Stoch	(Norway) Johann André Forfang	(Norway) Robert Johansson
2019	21–24 March	(Japan) Ryoyu Kobayashi	(Germany) Markus Eisenbichler	(Slovenia) Timi Zajc
2021	26–28 March	(Germany) Karl Geiger	(Japan) Ryoyu Kobayashi	(Germany) Markus Eisenbichler
2022	24–27 March	(Slovenia) Timi Zajc	(Norway) Marius Lindvik	(Slovenia) Peter Prevc
2023	30 March–2 April	(Austria) Stefan Kraft	(Slovenia) Anže Lanišek	(Slovenia) Timi Zajc
2024	21–24 March	(Austria) Daniel Huber	(Slovenia) Peter Prevc	(Norway) Johann André Forfang
2025	27–30 March	(Slovenia) Domen Prevc	(Slovenia) Anže Lanišek	(Germany) Andreas Wellinger
2026	26–29 March	(Slovenia) Domen Prevc	(Norway) Marius Lindvik	(Austria) Daniel Tschofenig
