= 1992–93 FIS Ski Flying World Cup =

FIS Ski Flying World Cup 1992/93
Winners
- Overall: (Czech Republic) Jaroslav Sakala
- Nations Cup (unofficial): Austria

Competitions
- Venues: 1
- Individual: 2
- Cancelled: 2

The 1992/93 FIS Ski Flying World Cup was the 3rd official World Cup season in ski flying awarded with a small crystal globe as the subdiscipline of the FIS Ski Jumping World Cup.

== Map of World Cup hosts ==
(Austria) Bad Mitterndorf	(Norway) ~~Vikersund~~
Kulm	~~Vikersundbakken~~
Europe

== Calendar ==
=== Men's Individual ===
All	No.	Date	Place (Hill)	Size	Winner	Second	Third	Ski flying leader	R.
307	1	30 January 1993	(Austria) Bad Mitterndorf (Kulm K185)	F _{025}	(Czech Republic) Jaroslav Sakala	(Austria) Werner Haim	(Austria) Andreas Goldberger	(Czech Republic) Jaroslav Sakala	
308	2	31 January 1993	(Austria) Bad Mitterndorf (Kulm K185)	F _{026}	(Czech Republic) Jaroslav Sakala	(France) Didier Mollard	(Austria) Andreas Goldberger	(Czech Republic) Jaroslav Sakala	
		20 March 1993	(Norway) Vikersund (Vikersundbakken K175)	F _{cnx}	cancelled due to strong wind			—	
		21 March 1993	(Norway) Vikersund (Vikersundbakken K175)	F _{cnx}	cancelled due to strong wind			—	
3rd FIS Ski Flying Men's Overall (30 – 31 January 1993)					(Czech Republic) Jaroslav Sakala	(France) Didier Mollard	(Austria) Andreas Goldberger	Ski Flying Overall	

== Standings ==
Points were for the last time distributed by original old scoring system.

=== Ski Flying ===
Rank	after 2 events	30/01/1993 Kulm	31/01/1993 Kulm	Total
	(Czech Republic) Jaroslav Sakala	25	25	50
2	(France) Didier Mollard	11	20	31
3	(Austria) Andreas Goldberger	15	15	30
4	(Austria) Werner Haim	20	7	27
5	(Norway) Espen Bredesen	10	12	22
6	(Austria) Werner Rathmayr	9	11	20
7	(Austria) Christian Reinthaler	5	10	15
8	(Norway) Lasse Ottesen	8	6	14
	(Norway) Helge Brendryen	6	8	14
10	(Germany) Christof Duffner	12	—	12
	(Norway) Bjørn Myrbakken	7	5	12
	(France) Jérôme Gay	3	9	12
13	(France) Nicolas Jean-Prost	—	5	5
14	(Austria) Stefan Horngacher	4	—	4
15	(Czech Republic) Tomáš Goder	—	3	3
16	(Austria) Werner Schuster	2	—	2
	(Austria) Alexander Diess	—	2	2
18	(Austria) Alexander Stöckl	1	—	1
	(Slovakia) Marián Bielčík	—	1	1

=== Nations Cup (unofficial) ===
Rank	after 2 events	Points
1	Austria	101
2	Norway	62
3	Czech Republic	53
4	France	48
5	Germany	12
6	Slovakia	1
