= 1992–93 FIS Ski Jumping World Cup =

Ski jumping championship season

1992–93 World Cup
Winners
- Overall: (Austria) Andreas Goldberger
- Ski Flying: (Czech Republic) Jaroslav Sakala
- Four Hills Tournament: (Austria) Andreas Goldberger
- Nations Cup: Austria

Competitions
- Venues: 13
- Individual: 17
- Team: 2
- Cancelled: 7 (6 Ind. + 1 Men's team)
- Rescheduled: 2

The 1992–93 FIS Ski Jumping World Cup was the 14th World Cup season in ski jumping and the 3rd official World Cup season in ski flying with third small crystal globe awarded.

Season began in Falun, Sweden on 5 December 1992 and was finished in Planica, Slovenia on 28 March 1993. The individual World Cup overall winner was Austrian ski jumping "wunderkind" Andreas Goldberger (first of three overall globes in his career) and he took the 4H Tournament also in this season; with those results began his domination in both ski jumping and ski flying, lasting for next couple of years. Nations Cup was taken by Team of Austria.

17 men's individual events on 13 different venues in 8 countries were held on the two different continents (Europe and Asia); and six individual events were cancelled in Thunder Bay (rescheduled to Ruhpolding), Harrachov and in Vikersund. Also 2 men's team events were held (and one cancelled in Ruhpolding).

Peaks of the season were FIS Nordic World Ski Championships, Four Hills Tournament and planned Bohemia Tournament (which was cancelled due to financial reasons).

== Map of world cup hosts ==
Europe
Germany	Austria	Asia

== Calendar ==
=== Men's Individual ===
N – normal hill / L – large hill / F – flying hill
All	No.	Date	Place (Hill)	Size	Winner	Second	Third	Yellow bib	R.
297	1	5 December 1992	(Sweden) Falun (Lugnet K115)	L _{170}	(Austria) Werner Rathmayr	(Slovenia) Urban Franc	(Austria) Heinz Kuttin	(Austria) Werner Rathmayr	
298	2	6 December 1992	(Sweden) Falun (Lugnet K115)	L _{171}	(Austria) Werner Rathmayr	(Norway) Lasse Ottesen (Austria) Andreas Goldberger		(Austria) Werner Rathmayr	
		12 December 1992	(Canada) Thunder Bay (Big Thunder K90, K120)	N _{cnx}	cancelled due to reconstruction delays at ski jump hills; rescheduled to Ruhpolding as team competition			(Austria) Werner Rathmayr	
		13 December 1992	(Canada) Thunder Bay (Big Thunder K90, K120)	L _{cnx}	cancelled due to reconstruction delays at ski jump hills; rescheduled to Ruhpolding			(Austria) Werner Rathmayr	
299	3	(Note: Cancelled event from Thunder Bay (13 December) was rescheduled to Ruhpolding on the same day.)13 December 1992	(Germany) Ruhpolding (Große Zirmbergschanze K107)	L _{172}	(Switzerland) Stephan Zünd	(Austria) Werner Rathmayr	(France) Didier Mollard	(Austria) Werner Rathmayr	
300	4	19 December 1992	(Japan) Sapporo (Miyanomori K90) (Ōkurayama K115)	N _{104}	(Austria) Martin Höllwarth	(Austria) Werner Rathmayr	(France) Steve Delaup	(Austria) Werner Rathmayr	
301	5	20 December 1992	(Japan) Sapporo (Miyanomori K90) (Ōkurayama K115)	L _{173}	(Japan) Akira Higashi	(Austria) Werner Rathmayr	(Norway) Bjørn Myrbakken	(Austria) Werner Rathmayr	
302	6	30 December 1992	(Germany) Oberstdorf (Schattenbergschanze K115)	L _{174}	(Germany) Christof Duffner	(Austria) Andreas Goldberger	(Japan) Noriaki Kasai	(Austria) Werner Rathmayr	
303	7	1 January 1993	(Germany) Garmisch-Pa (Große Olympiaschanze K107)	L _{175}	(Japan) Noriaki Kasai	(Germany) Jens Weißflog	(Austria) Andreas Goldberger	(Austria) Werner Rathmayr	
304	8	4 January 1993	(Austria) Innsbruck (Bergiselschanze K109)	L _{176}	(Austria) Andreas Goldberger	(Czech Republic) Jaroslav Sakala	(Japan) Noriaki Kasai		
305	9	6 January 1993	(Austria) Bischofshofen (Paul-Ausserleitner K120)	L _{177}	(Austria) Andreas Goldberger	(Japan) Noriaki Kasai	(France) Didier Mollard		
41st Four Hills Tournament Overall (30 December 1992 – 6 January 1993)					(Austria) Andreas Goldberger	(Japan) Noriaki Kasai	(Czech Republic) Jaroslav Sakala	4H Tournament	
		15 January 1993	(Czech Republic) Harrachov (Čerťák K120)	L _{cnx}	cancelled due to financial reasons			—	
		17 January 1993	(Czech Republic) Liberec (Ještěd K120)	L _{cnx}	cancelled due to financial reasons			—	
Bohemia Tournament Overall (16 – 17 January 1993)					cancelled due to financial reasons			Bohemia Tournament	
306	10	23 January 1993	(Italy) Predazzo (Trampolino dal Ben K120)	L _{178}	(Japan) Noriaki Kasai	(Slovenia) Franci Petek	(Japan) Yūji Ashimoto	(Austria) Werner Rathmayr	
307	11	30 January 1993	(Austria) Bad Mitterndorf (Kulm K185)	F _{025}	(Czech Republic) Jaroslav Sakala	(Austria) Werner Haim	(Austria) Andreas Goldberger	(Austria) Werner Rathmayr	
308	12	31 January 1993	(Austria) Bad Mitterndorf (Kulm K185)	F _{026}	(Czech Republic) Jaroslav Sakala	(France) Didier Mollard	(Austria) Andreas Goldberger	(Austria) Werner Rathmayr	
FIS Nordic World Ski Championships 1993 (21 – 27 February • (Sweden) Falun)
309	13	6 March 1993	(Finland) Lahti (Salpausselkä K90, K114)	N _{105}	(Japan) Noriaki Kasai	(Czech Republic) Jaroslav Sakala	(Czech Republic) Jiri Parma	(Austria) Werner Rathmayr	
310	14	7 March 1993	(Finland) Lahti (Salpausselkä K90, K114)	L _{179}	(Italy) Ivan Lunardi	(Austria) Stefan Horngacher	(Norway) Espen Bredesen	(Austria) Werner Rathmayr	
311	15	11 March 1993	(Norway) Lillehammer (Lysgårdsbakken K120)	L _{180}	(Norway) Espen Bredesen	(Japan) Takanobu Okabe	(Austria) Andreas Goldberger	(Austria) Andreas Goldberger	
312	16	14 March 1993	(Norway) Oslo (Holmenkollbakken K110)	L _{181}	(Norway) Espen Bredesen	(France) Didier Mollard	(Czech Republic) Jaroslav Sakala	(Austria) Andreas Goldberger	
		20 March 1993	(Norway) Vikersund (Vikersundbakken K175)	F _{cnx}	cancelled due to strong wind			—	
		21 March 1993	(Norway) Vikersund (Vikersundbakken K175)	F _{cnx}	cancelled due to strong wind			—	
313	17	28 March 1993	(Slovenia) Planica (Bloudkova velikanka K120)	L _{182}	(Norway) Espen Bredesen	(Austria) Andreas Goldberger	(Germany) Christof Duffner	(Austria) Andreas Goldberger	
14th FIS World Cup Overall (5 December 1992 – 28 March 1993)					(Austria) Andreas Goldberger	(Czech Republic) Jaroslav Sakala	(Japan) Noriaki Kasai	World Cup Overall	

=== Men's Team ===
All	No.	Date	Place (Hill)	Size	Winner	Second	Third	R.
		(Note: Cancelled individual event from Thunder Bay (12 December) was rescheduled to Ruhpolding as team event on the same day.)12 December 1992	(Germany) Ruhpolding (Große Zirmbergschanze K107)	L _{cnx}	cancelled due to heavy rain			
3	1	24 January 1993	(Italy) Predazzo (Trampolino dal Ben K120)	L _{003}	Austria Stefan Horngacher; Ernst Vettori; Werner Rathmayr; Andreas Goldberger	Germany Christof Duffner; Gerd Siegmund; Dieter Thoma; Jens Weißflog	Japan Yūji Ashimoto; Akira Higashi; Masahiko Harada; Noriaki Kasai	
4	2	27 March 1993	(Slovenia) Planica (Bloudkova velikanka K120)	L _{004}	Japan Takanobu Okabe; Naoki Yasuzaki; Masahiko Harada; Noriaki Kasai	Norway Roar Ljøkelsøy; Bjørn Myrbakken; Helge Brendryen; Espen Bredesen	Slovenia Robert Meglič; Matjaž Zupan; Urban Franc; Samo Gostiša	

== Standings ==
=== Overall ===
Rank	after 17 events	Points
1	(Austria) Andreas Goldberger	206
2	(Czech Republic) Jaroslav Sakala	185
3	(Japan) Noriaki Kasai	172
4	(Austria) Werner Rathmayr	171
5	(Norway) Espen Bredesen	151
6	(Germany) Christof Duffner	121
7	(France) Didier Mollard	114
8	(Austria) Stefan Horngacher	78
9	(Austria) Werner Haim	71
10	(Norway) Bjørn Myrbakken	63

=== Ski Flying ===
Rank	after 2 events	Points
1	(Czech Republic) Jaroslav Sakala	50
2	(France) Didier Mollard	31
3	(Austria) Andreas Goldberger	30
4	(Austria) Werner Haim	27
5	(Norway) Espen Bredesen	22
6	(Austria) Werner Rathmayr	20
7	(Austria) Christian Reinthaler	15
8	(Norway) Lasse Ottesen	14
	(Norway) Helge Brendryen	14
10	(Germany) Christof Duffner	12

=== Nations Cup ===
Rank	after 19 events	Points
1	Austria	781
2	Japan	444
3	Norway	375
4	Czech Republic	299
5	Germany	280
6	France	246
7	Slovenia	171
8	Finland	96
9	Italy	73
10	Switzerland	64

=== Four Hills Tournament ===
Rank	after 4 events	Points
1	(Austria) Andreas Goldberger	920.8
2	(Japan) Noriaki Kasai	898.7
3	(Czech Republic) Jaroslav Sakala	854.6
4	(Japan) Masahiko Harada	828.4
5	(Finland) Vesa Hakala	823.4
6	(Germany) Christof Duffner	818.9
7	(Austria) Werner Haim	816.7
8	(Germany) Jens Weißflog	814.7
9	(Austria) Werner Rathmayr	799.8
10	(Austria) Heinz Kuttin	799.7

== See also ==
- 1992–93 FIS Europa/Continental Cup (2nd level competition)
