= 1991–92 FIS Ski Flying World Cup =

FIS Ski Flying World Cup 1991/92
Winners
- Overall: (Austria) Werner Rathmayr

Competitions
- Venues: 2
- Individual: 3
- Cancelled: 1

The 1991/92 FIS Ski Flying World Cup was the 2nd official World Cup season in ski flying awarded with small crystal globe as the subdiscipline of FIS Ski Jumping World Cup.

== Map of World Cup hosts ==
(Germany) Oberstdorf	(Czech Republic) Harrachov
Heini-Klopfer-Skiflugschanze	Čerťák
Europe

== Invalid world record ==
Invalid world record distance achieved within this World Cup season.

Date	Athlete	Hill	Round	Place	Metres	Feet
22 March 1992	(Germany) Christof Duffner	Čerťák K185	R1	Harrachov, Czechoslovakia	194	636

Tied official world record distance at that time, but invalid due to Duffner (crash) upon landing.

== Calendar ==
=== Men's Individual ===
All	No.	Date	Place (Hill)	Size	Winner	Second	Third	Ski flying leader	R.
287	1	25 January 1992	(Germany) Oberstdorf (Heini-Klopfer K182)	F _{022}	(Austria) Werner Rathmayr	(Austria) Andreas Felder	(Sweden) Mikael Martinsson	(Austria) Werner Rathmayr	
288	2	26 January 1992	(Germany) Oberstdorf (Heini-Klopfer K182)	F _{023}	(Austria) Werner Rathmayr	(Austria) Andreas Felder	(Austria) Andreas Goldberger	(Austria) Werner Rathmayr	
FIS World Cup 1991/92 = FIS Ski Flying World Championships 1992 (21 March • Harrachov)
295	3	21 March 1992	(Czechoslovakia) Harrachov (Čerťák K180)	F _{024}	(Japan) Noriaki Kasai	(Austria) Andreas Goldberger	(Italy) Roberto Cecon	(Austria) Werner Rathmayr	
		22 March 1992	(Czechoslovakia) Harrachov (Čerťák K180)	F _{cnx}	cancelled just before the end of first round due to strong wind (after Christof Duffner crashed at 194 metres WR distance)			—	
2nd FIS Ski Flying Men's Overall (25 January – 21 March 1992)					(Austria) Werner Rathmayr	(Austria) Andreas Goldberger	(Austria) Andreas Felder	Ski Flying Overall	

FIS Ski Jumping World Cup / FIS Ski Flying World Cup / FIS Ski Flying World Championships

== Standings ==
Points were still distributed by original old scoring system.

=== Ski Flying ===
Rank	after 3 events	25/01/1992 Oberstdorf	26/01/1992 Oberstdorf	21/03/1992 Harrachov	Total
	(Austria) Werner Rathmayr	25	25	—	50
2	(Austria) Andreas Goldberger	15	11	20	46
3	(Austria) Andreas Felder	20	20	—	40
4	(Czechoslovakia) Tomáš Goder	12	12	12	36
5	(Sweden) Mikael Martinsson	11	15	8	34
6	(Slovenia) Samo Gostiša	7	10	10	27
7	(Japan) Noriaki Kasai	—	—	25	25
8	(Switzerland) Stephan Zünd	10	9	—	19
	(Germany) Christof Duffner	4	4	11	19
10	(Switzerland) Martin Trunz	8	—	10	18
11	(Germany) Ralph Gebstedt	6	8	1	15
	(Italy) Roberto Cecon	—	—	15	15
13	(Czech Republic) Jaroslav Sakala	2	5	6	13
14	(Austria) Alexander Pointner	5	6	—	11
15	(Austria) Werner Haim	9	1	—	10
16	(Germany) Marc Nölke	—	7	—	7
	(Italy) Ivan Lunardi	—	—	7	7
18	(Norway) Espen Bredesen	—	—	5	5
19	(Czechoslovakia) František Jež	4	—	—	4
	(Austria) Werner Schuster	—	4	—	4
	(Norway) Ole Gunnar Fidjestøl	—	—	4	4
22	(Czechoslovakia) Jiří Parma	1	—	2	3
	(Norway) Magne Johansen	—	—	3	3
24	(Slovenia) Matjaž Zupan	—	2	—	2

=== Nations Cup (unofficial) ===
Rank	after 3 events	Points
1	Austria	161
2	Czechoslovakia	56
3	Germany	41
4	Switzerland	37
5	Sweden	34
6	Slovenia	29
7	Japan	25
8	Italy	22
9	Norway	12
