= 1992–93 Four Hills Tournament =

Ski jumping competition

The 1992-93 Four Hills Tournament took place at the four traditional venues of Oberstdorf, Garmisch-Partenkirchen, Innsbruck and Bischofshofen, located in Germany and Austria, between 30 December 1992 and 6 January 1993.

== Results ==
Date	Place	Hill	Size	Winner	Second	Third	Ref.
30 Dec 1992	(Germany) Oberstdorf	Schattenbergschanze K-115	LH	(Germany) Christof Duffner	(Austria) Andreas Goldberger	(Japan) Noriaki Kasai	
1 Jan 1993	(Germany) Garmisch-Partenkirchen	Große Olympiaschanze K-107	LH	(Japan) Noriaki Kasai	(Germany) Jens Weißflog	(Austria) Andreas Goldberger	
4 Jan 1993	(Austria) Innsbruck	Bergiselschanze K-109	LH	(Austria) Andreas Goldberger	(Czech Republic) Jaroslav Sakala	(Japan) Noriaki Kasai	
6 Jan 1993	(Austria) Bischofshofen	Paul-Ausserleitner-Schanze K-120	LH	(Austria) Andreas Goldberger	(Japan) Noriaki Kasai	(France) Didier Mollard	

== Overall ==
Pos	Ski Jumper	Points
1	(Austria) Andreas Goldberger	920.8
2	(Japan) Noriaki Kasai	898.7
3	(Czech Republic) Jaroslav Sakala	854.6
4	(Japan) Masahiko Harada	828.4
5	(Finland) Vesa Hakala	823.4
6	(Germany) Christof Duffner	818.9
7	(Austria) Werner Haim	816.7
8	(Germany) Jens Weißflog	814.7
9	(Austria) Werner Rathmayr	799.8
10	(Austria) Heinz Kuttin	799.7
