= FIS Ski Jumping World Cup =

Series of ski jumping competitions

Ski Jumping World Cup
- Genre: Ski jumping, ski flying
- Locations: Europe; Asia; North America
- Inaugurated: 27 December 1979 (men's individual); 12 January 1992 (men's team); 3 December 2011 (women's individual); 23 November 2012 (mixed team); 16 December 2017 (women's team)
- Founder: Torbjørn Yggeseth
- Organiser: International Ski Federation
- People: Current race directors: Sandro Pertile (M); Chika Yoshida (L)
- Sponsor: Viessmann, Konica Minolta

The FIS Ski Jumping World Cup is the world's highest level of ski jumping and the FIS Ski Flying World Cup as the subdivisional part of the competition. It was founded by Torbjørn Yggeseth for the 1979/80 season and organized by the International Ski Federation. Women began competing during the 2011/12 season.

The rounds are hosted primarily in Europe, with regular stops in Japan and rarely in North America. These have been hosted in total 21 countries around the world for both men 20 and women: Austria, Bosnia and Herzegovina, China, Canada, Czech Republic, Finland, France, Germany, Italy, Japan, Kazakhstan, Norway, Poland, Romania, Russia, Slovakia, Slovenia, South Korea, Sweden, Switzerland and the United States. (Note: Note that the rounds hosted in Bosnia and Herzegovina and Slovakia were held when the countries were still part of Yugoslavia and Czechoslovakia respectively.)

Summer Grand Prix is the top level summer competition on plastic. The lower competitive circuits include the Continental Cup, the Inter-Continental Cup, the FIS Cup, the FIS Race and the Alpen Cup.

The Olympic Winter Games, the FIS Nordic World Ski Championships and the FIS Ski Flying World Championships do not count towards the World Cup. However, the 1984 Olympic Games, the 1982 Nordic World Ski Championships and the 1992, 1994, 1996 and 1998 Ski Flying World Championships were counted towards the World Cup.

== Scoring system ==
Each season consists of 25–30 competitions, usually two competitions on the same hill during a weekend. One competition consists of a qualifying round; first round, with 50 competitors; and second round, with 30. Qualifying round for the main event was introduced in 1990 to limit the number of competitors. The top 30 in the first round advance to the second round, which is held in reverse order, so the best jumper in the first round jumps last. The aggregate score in the first and second rounds determine the competition results. The top 30 are awarded World Cup points. The winner gets 100 points while number 30 receives 1 point. At team events only top 8 receive points.

=== Men's Individual ===
Seasons	1	2	3	4	5	6	7	8	9	10	11	12	13	14	15	16	17	18	19	20	21	22	23	24	25	26	27	28	29	30
1979/80–1992/93	25	20	15	12	11	10	9	8	7	6	5	4	3	2	1	points were not awarded														
1993/94–present	100	80	60	50	45	40	36	32	29	26	24	22	20	18	16	15	14	13	12	11	10	9	8	7	6	5	4	3	2	1

=== Women's Individual ===
Seasons	1	2	3	4	5	6	7	8	9	10	11	12	13	14	15	16	17	18	19	20	21	22	23	24	25	26	27	28	29	30
2011/12–present	100	80	60	50	45	40	36	32	29	26	24	22	20	18	16	15	14	13	12	11	10	9	8	7	6	5	4	3	2	1

=== Men's team ===
Seasons	1	2	3	4	5	6	7	8	9	10	11	12	13
1991/92–1992/93	60	50	40	30	20	15	14	13	12	11	10	9	8
1993/94–1999/00	200	160	120	100	90	80	points were not awarded						
2000/01–present	400	350	300	250	200	150	100	50	points are not being awarded				

=== Women's team ===
Seasons	1	2	3	4	5	6	7	8
2017/18–present	400	350	300	250	200	150	100	50

=== Mixed team ===
Seasons	1	2	3	4	5	6	7	8
2012/13–present	200	175	150	125	100	75	50	25

== Men's standings ==
The table below shows the three highest ranked jumpers each year.

=== Overall ===
Season	Winner	Runner-up	Third
1979/80	(Austria) Hubert Neuper	(Austria) Armin Kogler	(Polish People's Republic) Stanisław Bobak
1980/81	(Austria) Armin Kogler	(Norway) Roger Ruud	(Canada) Horst Bulau
1981/82	(Austria) Armin Kogler (2)	(Austria) Hubert Neuper	(Canada) Horst Bulau (2)
1982/83	(Finland) Matti Nykänen	(Canada) Horst Bulau	(Austria) Armin Kogler
1983/84	(East Germany) Jens Weißflog	(Finland) Matti Nykänen	(Czechoslovakia) Pavel Ploc
1984/85	(Finland) Matti Nykänen	(Austria) Andreas Felder	(Austria) Ernst Vettori
1985/86	(Finland) Matti Nykänen	(Austria) Ernst Vettori	(Austria) Andreas Felder
1986/87	(Norway) Vegard Opaas	(Austria) Ernst Vettori	(Austria) Andreas Felder
1987/88	(Finland) Matti Nykänen (4)	(Czechoslovakia) Pavel Ploc	(Socialist Federal Republic of Yugoslavia) Primož Ulaga
1988/89	(Sweden) Jan Boklöv	(East Germany) Jens Weißflog	(West Germany) Dieter Thoma
1989/90	(Finland) Ari-Pekka Nikkola	(Austria) Ernst Vettori (3)	(Austria) Andreas Felder
1990/91	(Austria) Andreas Felder	(Switzerland) Stephan Zünd	(Germany) Dieter Thoma (2)
1991/92	(Finland) Toni Nieminen	(Austria) Werner Rathmayr	(Austria) Andreas Felder (4)
1992/93	(Austria) Andreas Goldberger	(Czech Republic) Jaroslav Sakala	(Japan) Noriaki Kasai
1993/94	(Norway) Espen Bredesen	(Germany) Jens Weißflog (2)	(Austria) Andreas Goldberger
1994/95	(Austria) Andreas Goldberger	(Italy) Roberto Cecon	(Finland) Janne Ahonen
1995/96	(Austria) Andreas Goldberger (3)	(Finland) Ari-Pekka Nikkola	(Finland) Janne Ahonen
1996/97	(Slovenia) Primož Peterka	(Germany) Dieter Thoma	(Japan) Kazuyoshi Funaki
1997/98	(Slovenia) Primož Peterka (2)	(Japan) Kazuyoshi Funaki	(Austria) Andreas Widhölzl
1998/99	(Germany) Martin Schmitt	(Finland) Janne Ahonen	(Japan) Noriaki Kasai (2)
1999/00	(Germany) Martin Schmitt (2)	(Austria) Andreas Widhölzl	(Finland) Janne Ahonen
2000/01	(Poland) Adam Małysz	(Germany) Martin Schmitt	(Finland) Risto Jussilainen
2001/02	(Poland) Adam Małysz	(Germany) Sven Hannawald	(Finland) Matti Hautamäki
2002/03	(Poland) Adam Małysz	(Germany) Sven Hannawald (2)	(Austria) Andreas Widhölzl
2003/04	(Finland) Janne Ahonen	(Norway) Roar Ljøkelsøy	(Norway) Bjørn Einar Romøren
2004/05	(Finland) Janne Ahonen (2)	(Norway) Roar Ljøkelsøy (2)	(Finland) Matti Hautamäki (2)
2005/06	(Czech Republic) Jakub Janda	(Finland) Janne Ahonen (2)	(Switzerland) Andreas Küttel
2006/07	(Poland) Adam Małysz (4)	(Norway) Anders Jacobsen	(Switzerland) Simon Ammann
2007/08	(Austria) Thomas Morgenstern	(Austria) Gregor Schlierenzauer	(Finland) Janne Ahonen (4)
2008/09	(Austria) Gregor Schlierenzauer	(Switzerland) Simon Ammann	(Austria) Wolfgang Loitzl
2009/10	(Switzerland) Simon Ammann	(Austria) Gregor Schlierenzauer	(Austria) Thomas Morgenstern
2010/11	(Austria) Thomas Morgenstern (2)	(Switzerland) Simon Ammann (2)	(Poland) Adam Małysz
2011/12	(Norway) Anders Bardal	(Austria) Gregor Schlierenzauer (3)	(Austria) Andreas Kofler
2012/13	(Austria) Gregor Schlierenzauer (2)	(Norway) Anders Bardal	(Poland) Kamil Stoch
2013/14	(Poland) Kamil Stoch	(Slovenia) Peter Prevc	(Germany) Severin Freund
2014/15	(Germany) Severin Freund	(Slovenia) Peter Prevc (2)	(Austria) Stefan Kraft
2015/16	(Slovenia) Peter Prevc	(Germany) Severin Freund	(Norway) Kenneth Gangnes
2016/17	(Austria) Stefan Kraft	(Poland) Kamil Stoch	(Norway) Daniel-André Tande
2017/18	(Poland) Kamil Stoch (2)	(Germany) Richard Freitag	(Norway) Daniel-André Tande (2)
2018/19	(Japan) Ryōyū Kobayashi	(Austria) Stefan Kraft	(Poland) Kamil Stoch
2019/20	(Austria) Stefan Kraft	(Germany) Karl Geiger	(Japan) Ryōyū Kobayashi
2020/21	(Norway) Halvor Egner Granerud	(Germany) Markus Eisenbichler	(Poland) Kamil Stoch (3)
2021/22	(Japan) Ryōyū Kobayashi (2)	(Germany) Karl Geiger (2)	(Norway) Marius Lindvik
2022/23	(Norway) Halvor Egner Granerud (2)	(Austria) Stefan Kraft (2)	(Slovenia) Anže Lanišek
2023/24	(Austria) Stefan Kraft (3)	(Japan) Ryōyū Kobayashi	(Germany) Andreas Wellinger
2024/25	(Austria) Daniel Tschofenig	(Austria) Jan Hörl	(Austria) Stefan Kraft (2)
2025/26	(Slovenia) Domen Prevc	(Japan) Ryōyū Kobayashi (2)	(Austria) Daniel Tschofenig

=== Nations Cup ===
Season	Winner	Runner-up	Third
1979/80	Austria	Norway	Japan
1980/81	Austria	Norway	Finland
1981/82	Austria	Norway	Finland
1982/83	Norway	Finland	Austria
1983/84	Finland	East Germany	Czechoslovakia
1984/85	Finland	Austria	Norway
1985/86	Austria	Finland	Norway
1986/87	Norway	Finland	Austria
1987/88	Finland	Czechoslovakia	Norway
1988/89	Norway	Finland	Austria
1989/90	Austria	Czechoslovakia (2)	Finland
1990/91	Austria	Germany	Finland
1991/92	Austria	Finland	Czechoslovakia (2)
1992/93	Austria	Japan	Norway
1993/94	Norway	Japan	Austria
1994/95	Finland	Austria	Japan
1995/96	Finland	Japan (3)	Austria
1996/97	Japan	Norway	Finland
1997/98	Japan	Austria	Germany
1998/99	Japan (3)	Germany	Austria
1999/00	Finland	Austria	Germany
2000/01	Finland (7)	Austria	Germany
2001/02	Germany	Austria	Finland
2002/03	Austria	Finland	Norway
2003/04	Norway	Finland	Austria
2004/05	Austria	Finland	Norway
2005/06	Austria	Norway	Finland
2006/07	Austria	Norway	Switzerland
2007/08	Austria	Norway	Finland (8)
2008/09	Austria	Finland (9)	Norway
2009/10	Austria	Norway	Germany
2010/11	Austria	Norway	Poland
2011/12	Austria	Norway	Germany
2012/13	Norway	Austria	Germany
2013/14	Austria	Germany	Slovenia
2014/15	Germany	Norway	Austria (8)
2015/16	Norway	Slovenia	Germany
2016/17	Poland	Austria	Germany
2017/18	Norway	Germany	Poland (2)
2018/19	Poland (2)	Germany	Japan
2019/20	Germany (3)	Austria (9)	Norway
2020/21	Norway (9)	Poland	Germany
2021/22	Austria	Slovenia	Germany
2022/23	Austria	Norway (12)	Slovenia (2)
2023/24	Austria	Slovenia	Germany (11)
2024/25	Austria	Germany (6)	Norway (9)
2025/26	Austria (23)	Slovenia (4)	Japan (4)

=== Ski Flying ===
Season	Winner	Runner-up	Third
1990/91	(Switzerland) Stephan Zünd	(Austria) Stefan Horngacher	(Germany) Ralf Gebstedt
1991/92	(Austria) Werner Rathmayr	(Austria) Andreas Goldberger	(Austria) Andreas Felder
1992/93	(Czech Republic) Jaroslav Sakala	(France) Didier Mollard	(Austria) Andreas Goldberger
1993/94	(Czech Republic) Jaroslav Sakala (2)	(Norway) Espen Bredesen	(Italy) Roberto Cecon
1994/95	(Austria) Andreas Goldberger	(Japan) Takanobu Okabe	(Italy) Roberto Cecon (2)
1995/96	(Austria) Andreas Goldberger (2)	(Finland) Janne Ahonen	(Germany) Christof Duffner
1996/97	(Slovenia) Primož Peterka	(Japan) Takanobu Okabe (2)	(Japan) Kazuyoshi Funaki
1997/98	(Germany) Sven Hannawald	(Japan) Kazuyoshi Funaki	(Austria) Andreas Widhölzl (Slovenia) Primož Peterka
1998/99	(Germany) Martin Schmitt	(Japan) Noriaki Kasai	(Japan) Hideharu Miyahira
1999/00	(Germany) Sven Hannawald (2)	(Finland) Janne Ahonen (2)	(Norway) Tommy Ingebrigtsen
2000/01	(Germany) Martin Schmitt (2)	(Poland) Adam Malysz	(Finland) Risto Jussilainen
2008/09	(Austria) Gregor Schlierenzauer	(Finland) Harri Olli	(Switzerland) Simon Ammann
2009/10	(Slovenia) Robert Kranjec	(Austria) Gregor Schlierenzauer	(Switzerland) Simon Ammann
2010/11	(Austria) Gregor Schlierenzauer	(Austria) Martin Koch	(Austria) Thomas Morgenstern
2011/12	(Slovenia) Robert Kranjec (2)	(Austria) Martin Koch (2)	(Switzerland) Simon Ammann (3)
2012/13	(Austria) Gregor Schlierenzauer (3)	(Slovenia) Robert Kranjec	(Norway) Andreas Stjernen
2013/14	(Slovenia) Peter Prevc	(Japan) Noriaki Kasai (2)	(Austria) Gregor Schlierenzauer
2014/15	(Slovenia) Peter Prevc	(Germany) Severin Freund	(Slovenia) Jurij Tepeš
2015/16	(Slovenia) Peter Prevc (3)	(Slovenia) Robert Kranjec (2)	(Norway) Johann André Forfang
2016/17	(Austria) Stefan Kraft	(Germany) Andreas Wellinger	(Poland) Kamil Stoch
2017/18	(Norway) Andreas Stjernen	(Norway) Robert Johansson (Poland) Kamil Stoch	
2018/19	(Japan) Ryōyū Kobayashi	(Germany) Markus Eisenbichler	(Poland) Piotr Żyła
2019/20	(Austria) Stefan Kraft	(Slovenia) Timi Zajc	(Poland) Piotr Żyła (2)
2020/21	(Germany) Karl Geiger	(Japan) Ryōyū Kobayashi	(Germany) Markus Eisenbichler
2021/22	(Slovenia) Žiga Jelar	(Slovenia) Timi Zajc (2)	(Austria) Stefan Kraft
2022/23	(Austria) Stefan Kraft (3)	(Norway) Halvor Egner Granerud	(Slovenia) Anže Lanišek
2023/24	(Austria) Daniel Huber	(Austria) Stefan Kraft	(Slovenia) Peter Prevc
2024/25	(Slovenia) Domen Prevc	(Slovenia) Anže Lanišek	(Germany) Andreas Wellinger
2025/26	(Slovenia) Domen Prevc (2)	(Austria) Stephan Embacher	(Norway) Johann André Forfang (2)

=== Ski Jumping (JP) Cup ===
Season	Winner	Runner-up	Third
1995/96	(Finland) Ari-Pekka Nikkola	(Austria) Andreas Goldberger	(Japan) Masahiko Harada
1996/97	(Germany) Dieter Thoma	(Slovenia) Primož Peterka	(Japan) Hiroya Saito
1997/98	(Slovenia) Primož Peterka	(Japan) Masahiko Harada	(Austria) Andreas Widhölzl
1998/99	(Finland) Janne Ahonen	(Germany) Martin Schmitt	(Japan) Kazuyoshi Funaki
1999/00	(Germany) Martin Schmitt	(Austria) Andreas Widhölzl	(Finland) Janne Ahonen

*This additional title was awarded from 1996 to 2000 for the best individual normal and large hill results only.
The winner received a small Crystal Globe. This title was distinct from the overall WC, which included ski flying.

- Titles Overall:

Rank	Nation	Wins	Second	Third	Total
1	Austria	15	14	15	44
2	Finland	8	4	7	19
3	Poland	6	1	5	12
4	Norway	5	5	5	15
5	Slovenia	4	2	1	7
6	Germany	3	10	4	19
7	Japan	2	3	4	9
8	Switzerland	1	3	2	6
9	Czech Republic	1	1		2
9	East Germany	1	1		2
11	Sweden	1			1
12	Canada		1	2	3
13	Czechoslovakia		1	1	2
13	Italy		1		1
14	Yugoslavia			1	1

- Nations Cup:

Rank	Nation	Wins	Second	Third	Total
1	Austria	23	9	8	40
2	Norway	9	12	9	30
3	Finland	7	9	8	24
4	Germany	3	6	11	20
5	Japan	3	4	3	10
6	Poland	2	1	2	5
7	Slovenia		4	2	6
8	Czechoslovakia		2	2	4
9	East Germany		1		1
10	Switzerland			1	1

- Ski Flying:

Rank	Nation	Wins	Second	Third	Total
1	Austria	10	7	6	23
2	Slovenia	9	5	4	18
3	Germany	5	3	4	12
4	Czech Republic	2			2
5	Japan	1	6	2	9
6	Norway	1	3	4	8
7	Switzerland	1		3	4
8	Finland		3	1	4
9	Poland		2	3	5
10	France		1		1
11	Italy			2	2

== Men's tournaments ==
There are other tournaments as part of the World Cup:

=== K.O.P. International Ski Flying Week ===
Season	Winner	Runner-up	Third
1980	(Norway) Per Bergerud	(Polish People's Republic) Stanisław Bobak	(Czechoslovakia) Ján Tánczos
1981	(Austria) Alois Lipburger	(Austria) Andreas Felder	(United States) John Broman
1982	(Austria) Hubert Neuper	(Finland) Matti Nykänen	(Austria) Andreas Felder
1983	(Finland) Matti Nykänen	(Czechoslovakia) Pavel Ploc	(Canada) Horst Bulau
1984	(Finland) Matti Nykänen (2)	(Czechoslovakia) Pavel Ploc (2)	(East Germany) Jens Weißflog
1985	(Norway) Ole Gunnar Fidjestøl	(Socialist Federal Republic of Yugoslavia) Miran Tepeš	(Czechoslovakia) Jiří Parma (Norway) Trond Jøran Pedersen (Polish People's Republic) Tadeusz Fijas
1986	(Austria) Andreas Felder	(Finland) Matti Nykänen (2)	(Austria) Ernst Vettori
1987	(Austria) Andreas Felder (2)	(Norway) Ole Gunnar Fidjestøl	(Socialist Federal Republic of Yugoslavia) Miran Tepeš
1989	(Norway) Ole Gunnar Fidjestøl (2)	(United States) Mike Holland	(Sweden) Jan Boklöv

=== Nordic Tournament ===
Season	Winner	Runner-up	Third
1997	(Japan) Kazuyoshi Funaki	(Norway) Kristian Brenden	(Austria) Andreas Widhölzl
1998	(Austria) Andreas Widhölzl	(Germany) Sven Hannawald	(Japan) Hiroya Saito
1999	(Japan) Noriaki Kasai	(Japan) Kazuyoshi Funaki	(Germany) Sven Hannawald
2000	(Germany) Sven Hannawald	(Finland) Janne Ahonen	(Finland) Ville Kantee
2001	(Poland) Adam Małysz	(Austria) Andreas Goldberger	(Germany) Martin Schmitt
2002	(Finland) Matti Hautamäki	(Poland) Adam Małysz	(Germany) Martin Schmitt (2)
2003	(Poland) Adam Małysz	(Finland) Matti Hautamäki	(Finland) Tami Kiuru
2004	(Norway) Roar Ljøkelsøy	(Norway) Bjørn Einar Romøren	(Switzerland) Simon Ammann
2005	(Finland) Matti Hautamäki (2)	(Norway) Roar Ljøkelsøy	(Germany) Michael Uhrmann
2006	(Austria) Thomas Morgenstern	(Switzerland) Andreas Küttel	(Finland) Janne Happonen
2007	(Poland) Adam Małysz (3)	(Austria) Andreas Kofler	(Switzerland) Simon Ammann
2008	(Austria) Gregor Schlierenzauer	(Norway) Tom Hilde	(Finland) Janne Happonen (2)
2009	(Austria) Gregor Schlierenzauer (2)	(Finland) Harri Olli	(Switzerland) Simon Ammann (3)
2010	(Switzerland) Simon Ammann	(Poland) Adam Małysz (2)	(Austria) Thomas Morgenstern

=== Raw Air ===
Season	Winner	Runner-up	Third
2017	(Austria) Stefan Kraft	(Poland) Kamil Stoch	(Germany) Andreas Wellinger
2018	(Poland) Kamil Stoch	(Norway) Robert Johansson	(Norway) Andreas Stjernen
2019	(Japan) Ryōyū Kobayashi	(Austria) Stefan Kraft	(Norway) Robert Johansson
2020	(Poland) Kamil Stoch (2)	(Japan) Ryōyū Kobayashi	(Norway) Marius Lindvik
2022	(Austria) Stefan Kraft	(Germany) Karl Geiger	(Japan) Ryōyū Kobayashi
2023	(Norway) Halvor Egner Granerud	(Austria) Stefan Kraft (2)	(Slovenia) Anže Lanišek
2024	(Austria) Stefan Kraft (3)	(Slovenia) Peter Prevc	(Austria) Daniel Huber
2025	(Germany) Andreas Wellinger	(Slovenia) Domen Prevc	(Japan) Ryōyū Kobayashi (2)

=== Planica7 ===
Season	Winner	Runner-up	Third
2018	(Poland) Kamil Stoch	(Norway) Johann André Forfang	(Norway) Robert Johansson
2019	(Japan) Ryōyū Kobayashi	(Germany) Markus Eisenbichler	(Slovenia) Timi Zajc
2021	(Germany) Karl Geiger	(Japan) Ryōyū Kobayashi	(Germany) Markus Eisenbichler
2022	(Slovenia) Timi Zajc	(Norway) Marius Lindvik	(Slovenia) Peter Prevc
2023	(Austria) Stefan Kraft	(Slovenia) Anže Lanišek	(Slovenia) Timi Zajc (2)
2024	(Austria) Daniel Huber	(Slovenia) Peter Prevc	(Norway) Johann André Forfang
2025	(Slovenia) Domen Prevc	(Slovenia) Anže Lanišek (2)	(Germany) Andreas Wellinger
2026	(Slovenia) Domen Prevc (2)	(Norway) Marius Lindvik (2)	(Austria) Daniel Tschofenig

=== Swiss Tournament ===
Season	Winner	Runner-up	Third
1980	(Norway) Roger Ruud	(Norway) Johan Sætre	(Switzerland) Hansjörg Sumi
1981	(Austria) Armin Kogler	(Austria) Hubert Neuper	(Norway) Johan Sætre
1982	(Italy) Massimo Rigoni	(East Germany) Klaus Ostwald	(West Germany) Andreas Bauer
1983	(Norway) Per Bergerud	(Finland) Pentti Kokkonen	(Finland) Jari Puikkonen
1985	(East Germany) Jens Weißflog	(Austria) Ernst Vettori	(Norway) Per Bergerud
1986	(Norway) Rolf Åge Berg	(Finland) Matti Nykänen	(East Germany) Ulf Findeisen
1988	(Finland) Matti Nykänen	(Socialist Federal Republic of Yugoslavia) Miran Tepeš	(Austria) Ernst Vettori
1990	(Czechoslovakia) František Jež	(Austria) Heinz Kuttin	(Finland) Ari-Pekka Nikkola
1992	(Austria) Andreas Felder	(Austria) Werner Rathmayr	(Switzerland) Stephan Zünd

=== Bohemia Tournament ===
Season	Winner	Runner-up	Third
1981	(Norway) Roger Ruud	(Austria) Armin Kogler	(Austria) Hans Wallner
1983	(East Germany) Klaus Ostwald	(Finland) Markku Pusenius	(Czechoslovakia) Pavel Ploc
1984	(East Germany) Jens Weißflog	(Czechoslovakia) Jiří Parma	(East Germany) Holger Freitag
1986	(Finland) Matti Nykänen	(Austria) Ernst Vettori	(Czechoslovakia) Jiří Parma
1989	(Norway) Jon Inge Kjørum	(Czechoslovakia) Pavel Ploc	(Czechoslovakia) Ladislav Dluhoš
1990	(Austria) Werner Haim	(Czechoslovakia) Ladislav Dluhoš	(Austria) Ernst Vettori
1994	(Norway) Espen Bredesen	(Czech Republic) Jaroslav Sakala	(Norway) Lasse Ottesen

=== FIS Team Tour ===
Season	Winner	Runner-up	Third
2009	Norway	Austria	Finland
2010	Austria	Norway	Germany
2011	Austria	Norway	Germany (2)
2012	Austria (3)	Norway (3)	Slovenia
2013	Norway (2)	Slovenia	Austria

=== Willingen Five (2018–2020) / Six (2021) ===
Season	Winner	Runner-up	Third
2018	(Poland) Kamil Stoch	(Norway) Johann Andre Forfang	(Norway) Daniel-André Tande
2019	(Japan) Ryōyū Kobayashi	(Poland) Piotr Żyła	(Germany) Karl Geiger
2020	(Germany) Stephan Leyhe	(Austria) Stefan Kraft	(Norway) Marius Lindvik
2021	(Norway) Halvor Egner Granerud	(Norway) Daniel-André Tande	(Germany) Markus Eisenbichler

=== Titisee-Neustadt Five ===
Season	Winner	Runner-up	Third
2020	(Japan) Ryōyū Kobayashi	(Poland) Dawid Kubacki	(Germany) Stephan Leyhe

=== PolSKI Tour ===
Season	Winner	Runner-up	Third
2024	Austria	Slovenia	Germany

== Women's standings ==
=== Overall ===
Season	Winner	Runner-up	Third
2011/12	(United States) Sarah Hendrickson	(Austria) Daniela Iraschko	(Japan) Sara Takanashi
2012/13	(Japan) Sara Takanashi	(United States) Sarah Hendrickson	(France) Coline Mattel
2013/14	(Japan) Sara Takanashi	(Germany) Carina Vogt	(Japan) Yūki Itō
2014/15	(Austria) Daniela Iraschko-Stolz	(Japan) Sara Takanashi	(Germany) Carina Vogt
2015/16	(Japan) Sara Takanashi	(Austria) Daniela Iraschko-Stolz (2)	(Slovenia) Maja Vtič
2016/17	(Japan) Sara Takanashi (4)	(Japan) Yūki Itō	(Norway) Maren Lundby
2017/18	(Norway) Maren Lundby	(Germany) Katharina Althaus	(Japan) Sara Takanashi (2)
2018/19	(Norway) Maren Lundby	(Germany) Katharina Althaus	(Germany) Juliane Seyfarth
2019/20	(Norway) Maren Lundby (3)	(Austria) Chiara Hölzl	(Austria) Eva Pinkelnig
2020/21	(Slovenia) Nika Križnar	(Japan) Sara Takanashi (2)	(Austria) Marita Kramer
2021/22	(Austria) Marita Kramer	(Slovenia) Nika Križnar	(Slovenia) Urša Bogataj
2022/23	(Austria) Eva Pinkelnig	(Germany) Katharina Althaus (3)	(Slovenia) Ema Klinec
2023/24	(Slovenia) Nika Prevc	(Austria) Eva Pinkelnig	(Canada) Alexandria Loutitt
2024/25	(Slovenia) Nika Prevc	(Germany) Selina Freitag	(Germany) Katharina Schmid
2025/26	(Slovenia) Nika Prevc (3)	(Japan) Nozomi Maruyama	(Norway) Anna Odine Strøm

=== Ski Flying ===
Season	Winner	Runner-up	Third
2025/26	(Norway) Eirin Maria Kvandal	(Slovenia) Nika Prevc	(Norway) Anna Odine Strøm

=== Nations Cup ===
Season	Winner	Runner-up	Third
2011/12	United States	Germany	Japan
2012/13	United States (2)	Slovenia	Japan
2013/14	Japan	Germany	Slovenia
2014/15	Austria	Japan	Germany
2015/16	Austria	Japan	Slovenia
2016/17	Japan	Germany	Slovenia
2017/18	Germany	Japan (3)	Norway
2018/19	Germany	Norway	Austria
2019/20	Austria	Norway	Japan
2020/21	Austria	Slovenia	Norway
2021/22	Slovenia	Austria	Japan
2022/23	Austria	Germany (4)	Norway (3)
2023/24	Austria (6)	Slovenia (3)	Japan (5)
2024/25	Germany (3)	Norway	Austria (2)
2025/26	Japan (3)	Norway (4)	Slovenia (4)

=== Raw Air ===
Season	Winner	Runner-up	Third
2019	(Norway) Maren Lundby	(Germany) Katharina Althaus	(Germany) Juliane Seyfarth
2020	(Norway) Maren Lundby (2)	(Norway) Silje Opseth	(Austria) Eva Pinkelnig
2022	(Slovenia) Nika Križnar	(Japan) Sara Takanashi	(Slovenia) Urša Bogataj
2023	(Slovenia) Ema Klinec	(Germany) Katharina Althaus (2)	(Germany) Selina Freitag
2024	(Norway) Eirin Maria Kvandal	(Norway) Silje Opseth (2)	(Austria) Eva Pinkelnig (2)
2025	(Slovenia) Nika Prevc	(Norway) Eirin Maria Kvandal	(Norway) Anna Odine Strøm

=== Russia Tour Blue Bird ===
Season	Winner	Runner-up	Third
2019	(Germany) Juliane Seyfarth	(Norway) Maren Lundby	(Germany) Katharina Althaus
2021	(Austria) Marita Kramer	(Japan) Sara Takanashi	(Slovenia) Nika Križnar

=== Alpenkrone ===
Season	Winner	Runner-up	Third
2022	(Slovenia) Nika Križnar	(Austria) Marita Kramer	(Austria) Lisa Eder

=== Lillehammer Triple ===
Season	Winner	Runner-up	Third
2017/18	(Germany) Katharina Althaus	(Norway) Maren Lundby	(Japan) Sara Takanashi
2018/19	(Germany) Katharina Althaus (2)	(Germany) Juliane Seyfarth	(Germany) Ramona Straub

=== Silvester Tournament ===
Season	Winner	Runner-up	Third
2021/22	(Austria) Marita Kramer	(Slovenia) Nika Križnar	(Japan) Sara Takanashi
2022/23	(Austria) Eva Pinkelnig	(Norway) Anna Odine Strøm	(Slovenia) Nika Križnar

=== 2 Nights Tour ===
Season	Winner	Runner-up	Third
2023/24	(Slovenia) Nika Prevc	(Austria) Eva Pinkelnig	(Canada) Abigail Strate
2024/25	(Slovenia) Nika Prevc	(Norway) Eirin Maria Kvandal	(Germany) Katharina Schmid
2025/26	(Slovenia) Nika Prevc (3)	(Germany) Selina Freitag	(Japan) Nozomi Maruyama

- Nations Cup:

Rank	Nation	Wins	Second	Third	Total
1	Austria	6	1	2	9
2	Germany	3	4	1	8
3	Japan	3	3	5	11
4	United States	2			2
5	Slovenia	1	3	4	8
6	Norway		4	3	7

== Titles ==
=== Overall ===
Rank	Winner	1st	2nd	3rd
1	(Finland) Matti Nykänen	4	1	0
2	(Poland) Adam Małysz	4	0	1
3	(Austria) Stefan Kraft	3	2	2
4	(Austria) Andreas Goldberger	3	0	1
5	(Austria) Gregor Schlierenzauer	2	3	0
6	(Finland) Janne Ahonen	2	2	4
7	(Japan) Ryōyū Kobayashi	2	2	1
8	(Poland) Kamil Stoch	2	1	3
9	(Austria) Armin Kogler	2	1	1
10	(Germany) Martin Schmitt	2	1	0
11	(Austria) Thomas Morgenstern	2	0	1
12	(Slovenia) Primož Peterka	2	0	0
	(Norway) Halvor Egner Granerud	2	0	0
14	(Switzerland) Simon Ammann	1	2	1
15	(East Germany) / (Germany) Jens Weißflog	1	2	0
	(Slovenia) Peter Prevc	1	2	0
17	(Austria) Andreas Felder	1	1	4
18	(Germany) Severin Freund	1	1	1
19	(Austria) Hubert Neuper	1	1	0
	(Finland) Ari-Pekka Nikkola	1	1	0
	(Norway) Anders Bardal	1	1	0
22	(Austria) Daniel Tschofenig	1	0	1
23	(Slovenia) Domen Prevc	1	0	0
	(Czech Republic) Jakub Janda	1	0	0
	(Finland) Toni Nieminen	1	0	0
	(Norway) Espen Bredesen	1	0	0
	(Norway) Vegard Opaas	1	0	0
	(Sweden) Jan Boklöv	1	0	0

=== Ski Flying ===
Rank	Winner	1st	2nd	3rd
1	(Austria) Gregor Schlierenzauer	3	1	1
	(Austria) Stefan Kraft	3	1	1
3	(Slovenia) Peter Prevc	3	0	1
4	(Slovenia) Robert Kranjec	2	2	0
5	(Austria) Andreas Goldberger	2	1	1
6	(Czech Republic) Jaroslav Sakala	2	0	0
	(Germany) Sven Hannawald	2	0	0
	(Germany) Martin Schmitt	2	0	0
	(Slovenia) Domen Prevc	2	0	0
10	(Japan) Ryōyū Kobayashi	1	1	0
11	(Slovenia) Primož Peterka	1	0	1
12	(Switzerland) Stephan Zünd	1	0	0
	(Austria) Werner Rathmayr	1	0	0
	(Norway) Andreas Stjernen	1	0	0
	(Germany) Karl Geiger	1	0	0
	(Slovenia) Žiga Jelar	1	0	0
	(Austria) Daniel Huber	1	0	0

=== Ski Jumping (JP) Cup ===
Rank	Winner	1st	2nd	3rd
1	(Slovenia) Primož Peterka	1	1	0
	(Germany) Martin Schmitt	1	1	0
3	(Finland) Janne Ahonen	1	0	1
4	(Finland) Ari-Pekka Nikkola	1	0	0
	(Germany) Dieter Thoma	1	0	0

== Men's general statistics ==
Events	Winners
1178	177

update: 21 November 2026

=== Wins ===
Rank		Wins
1	(Austria) Gregor Schlierenzauer	53
2	(Finland) Matti Nykänen	46
	(Austria) Stefan Kraft	46
4	(Poland) Adam Małysz	39
	(Poland) Kamil Stoch	39
6	(Japan) Ryōyū Kobayashi	37
7	(Finland) Janne Ahonen	36
8	(East Germany) / (Germany) Jens Weißflog	33
9	(Germany) Martin Schmitt	28
10	(Austria) Andreas Felder	25
	(Norway) Halvor Egner Granerud	25
12	(Slovenia) Peter Prevc	24
13	(Austria) Thomas Morgenstern	23
	(Switzerland) Simon Ammann	23
	(Slovenia) Domen Prevc	23
16	(Germany) Severin Freund	22
17	(Austria) Andreas Goldberger	20
18	(Germany) Sven Hannawald	18
	(Austria) Andreas Widhölzl	18
20	(Japan) Noriaki Kasai	17
21	(Finland) Matti Hautamäki	16
22	(Japan) Kazuyoshi Funaki	15
	(Slovenia) Primož Peterka	15
	(Austria) Ernst Vettori	15
	(Germany) Karl Geiger	15
26	(Canada) Horst Bulau	13
	(Austria) Armin Kogler	13
28	(Austria) Andreas Kofler	12
	(West Germany) / (Germany) Dieter Thoma (5+7)	12
30	(Norway) Roar Ljøkelsøy	11
	(Poland) Dawid Kubacki	11
	(Slovenia) Anže Lanišek	11
	(Austria) Daniel Tschofenig	11
34	(Czechoslovakia) Pavel Ploc	10
	(Norway) Anders Jacobsen	10
36	(Japan) Masahiko Harada	9
	(Finland) Toni Nieminen	9
	(Finland) Ari-Pekka Nikkola	9
	(Norway) Roger Ruud	9
	(Socialist Federal Republic of Yugoslavia) Primož Ulaga	9
	(Germany) Andreas Wellinger	9
	(Norway) Marius Lindvik	9
43	(Norway) Espen Bredesen	8
	(Austria) Hubert Neuper	8
	(Austria) Martin Höllwarth	8
	(Norway) Bjørn Einar Romøren	8
	(Germany) Richard Freitag	8
	(Norway) Daniel-André Tande	8
49	(Slovenia) Robert Kranjec	7
	(Norway) Vegard Opaas	7
	(Norway) Anders Bardal	7

=== Podiums ===
Rank		Podiums
1	(Austria) Stefan Kraft	129
2	(Finland) Janne Ahonen	108
3	(Poland) Adam Małysz	92
4	(Austria) Gregor Schlierenzauer	88
5	(Switzerland) Simon Ammann	80
	(Poland) Kamil Stoch	80
7	(Japan) Ryōyū Kobayashi	79
8	(Finland) Matti Nykänen	76
	(Austria) Thomas Morgenstern	76
10	(East Germany) / (Germany) Jens Weißflog (42+31)	73
11	(Austria) Andreas Goldberger	63
	(Japan) Noriaki Kasai	63
13	(Slovenia) Peter Prevc	62
14	(Austria) Ernst Vettori	54
15	(Germany) Severin Freund	53
16	(Germany) Martin Schmitt	52
17	(Austria) Andreas Felder	51
18	(Austria) Andreas Widhölzl	49
19	(Germany) Andreas Wellinger	43
	(Slovenia) Anže Lanišek	43
21	(Finland) Ari-Pekka Nikkola	42
	(Slovenia) Domen Prevc	42
23	(Norway) Halvor Egner Granerud	41
	(Germany) Karl Geiger	41
25	(Germany) Sven Hannawald	40
26	(Finland) Matti Hautamäki	38
	(Japan) Kazuyoshi Funaki	38
	(Poland) Dawid Kubacki	38
29	(Austria) Armin Kogler	37
30	(West Germany) / (Germany) Dieter Thoma	36
	(Austria) Andreas Kofler	36

=== Top ten appearances ===
Rank		Top 10s
1	(Finland) Janne Ahonen	248
2	(Austria) Stefan Kraft	243
3	(Japan) Noriaki Kasai	213
4	(Poland) Kamil Stoch	200
5	(Poland) Adam Małysz	198
6	(Switzerland) Simon Ammann	181
7	(Austria) Thomas Morgenstern	172
8	(Austria) Gregor Schlierenzauer	164
9	(Japan) Ryōyū Kobayashi	163
10	(Slovenia) Peter Prevc	155
11	(Austria) Andreas Goldberger	153
12	(Austria) Andreas Widhölzl	142
13	(Norway) Johann André Forfang	136
14	(Austria) Ernst Vettori	127
15	(East Germany) / (Germany) Jens Weißflog (71+55)	126
16	(Germany) Severin Freund	124
17	(Finland) Matti Hautamäki	122
	(Austria) Michael Hayböck	122
19	(Germany) Karl Geiger	119
20	(Poland) Piotr Żyła	117
	(Germany) Andreas Wellinger	117
22	(Austria) Andreas Kofler	116
22	(Norway) Roar Ljøkelsøy	115
23	(Finland) Matti Nykänen	114
	(Austria) Martin Höllwarth	114
26	(Germany) Martin Schmitt	110
27	(Slovenia) Anže Lanišek	108
28	(Austria) Wolfgang Loitzl	107
29	(Germany) Markus Eisenbichler	105
30	(Norway) Anders Bardal	103

== Ski flying section ==
Events	Winners
157	59

update: 29 March 2026

=== Wins ===
Rank		Wins
1	(Austria) Gregor Schlierenzauer	14
2	(Austria) Stefan Kraft	10
3	(Slovenia) Peter Prevc	8
4	(Slovenia) Domen Prevc	7
5	(Finland) Matti Nykänen	6
	(Poland) Adam Małysz	6
	(Slovenia) Robert Kranjec	6
8	(Austria) Andreas Goldberger	5
	(Poland) Kamil Stoch	5
	(Slovenia) Timi Zajc	5
11	(Germany) Sven Hannawald	4
	(Austria) Martin Koch	4
13	(Norway) Ole Gunnar Fidjestøl	3
	(Austria) Andreas Felder	3
	(Czech Republic) Jaroslav Sakala	3
	(Japan) Takanobu Okabe	3
	(Germany) Martin Schmitt	3
	(Finland) Matti Hautamäki	3
	(Japan) Noriaki Kasai	3
	(Japan) Ryōyū Kobayashi	3
	(Norway) Halvor Egner Granerud	3
22	(Austria) Alois Lipburger	2
	(Austria) Hubert Neuper	2
	(Austria) Werner Rathmayr	2
	(Austria) Andreas Widhölzl	2
	(Norway) Bjørn Einar Romøren	2
	(Finland) Harri Olli	2
	(Norway) Anders Jacobsen	2
	(Finland) Janne Ahonen	2
	(Germany) Severin Freund	2
	(Slovenia) Jurij Tepeš	2
	(Austria) Daniel Huber	2
	(Germany) Karl Geiger	2
	(Norway) Marius Lindvik	2

=== Podiums ===
Rank		Podiums
1	(Austria) Stefan Kraft	25
2	(Austria) Gregor Schlierenzauer	19
3	(Slovenia) Robert Kranjec	17
	(Slovenia) Peter Prevc	17
5	(Poland) Adam Małysz	15
6	(Switzerland) Simon Ammann	14
	(Slovenia) Domen Prevc	14
8	(Austria) Andreas Goldberger	13
	(Austria) Martin Koch	13
10	(Norway) Johann André Forfang	12
11	(Japan) Noriaki Kasai	11
	(Slovenia) Timi Zajc	11
	(Japan) Ryōyū Kobayashi	11
14	(Finland) Matti Nykänen	9
15	(Germany) Sven Hannawald	8
	(Austria) Andreas Felder	8
17	(Germany) Martin Schmitt	7
	(Finland) Janne Ahonen	7
	(Poland) Kamil Stoch	7
	(Germany) Markus Eisenbichler	7
	(Slovenia) Anže Lanišek	7
	(Germany) Andreas Wellinger	7
23	(Austria) Andreas Widhölzl	6
	(Japan) Takanobu Okabe	6
	(Finland) Matti Hautamäki	6
	(Slovenia) Jurij Tepeš	6
27	(Norway) Anders Jacobsen	5
	(Austria) Thomas Morgenstern	5
	(Finland) Risto Jussilainen	5
	(Poland) Piotr Żyła	5

=== Top ten appearances ===
Rank		Top 10s
1	(Austria) Stefan Kraft	43
2	(Slovenia) Robert Kranjec	39
3	(Norway) Johann André Forfang	36
4	(Slovenia) Peter Prevc	35
5	(Poland) Adam Małysz	34
	(Japan) Noriaki Kasai	34
7	(Switzerland) Simon Ammann	33
8	(Poland) Kamil Stoch	32
	(Slovenia) Domen Prevc	32
10	(Austria) Gregor Schlierenzauer	30
11	(Finland) Janne Ahonen	29
12	(Austria) Martin Koch	27
	(Poland) Piotr Żyła	27
	(Japan) Ryōyū Kobayashi	27
15	(Germany) Severin Freund	23
	(Austria) Michael Hayböck	23
17	(Austria) Andreas Goldberger	22
	(Finland) Matti Hautamäki	22
	(Slovenia) Timi Zajc	22

== Women's statistics ==
retired female ski jumper

Events	Winners
291	31

update: 21 November 2026

=== Wins ===
Rank		Wins
1	(Japan) Sara Takanashi	63
2	(Slovenia) Nika Prevc	40
3	(Norway) Maren Lundby	30
4	(Germany) Katharina Schmid	19
5	(Austria) Eva Pinkelnig	16
5	(Austria) Daniela Iraschko-Stolz	16
7	(Austria) Marita Kramer	15
8	(United States) Sarah Hendrickson	13
9	(Norway) Eirin Maria Kvandal	11
10	(Japan) Yūki Itō	10
11	(Austria) Chiara Kreuzer	8
12	(Norway) Silje Opseth	7
13	(Slovenia) Nika Vodan	6
13	(Japan) Nozomi Maruyama	6
15	(Norway) Anna Odine Strøm	5
16	(Germany) Juliane Seyfarth	4
17	(Austria) Jacqueline Seifriedsberger	3
17	(Slovenia) Urša Bogataj	3
19	(France) Joséphine Pagnier	2
19	(Canada) Alexandria Loutitt	2
19	(Austria) Lisa Eder	2
19	(Slovenia) Ema Klinec	2
19	(Germany) Carina Vogt	2
19	(France) Coline Mattel	2

=== Wins per season ===
Rank		Wins	Season
1	(Slovenia) Nika Prevc	18	2025/26
2	(Slovenia) Nika Prevc	15	2024/25
2	(Japan) Sara Takanashi	15	2013/14
4	(Japan) Sara Takanashi	14	2015/16
5	(Norway) Maren Lundby	12	2018/19
6	(Norway) Maren Lundby	7	2017/18
6	(Japan) Sara Takanashi	7	2016/17
6	(United States) Sarah Hendrickson	7	2011/12
9	(Japan) Sara Takanashi	8	2012/13
10	(Austria) Marita Kramer	7	2020/21
10	(Austria) Marita Kramer	7	2021/22
10	(Germany) Katharina Althaus	7	2022/23
10	(Slovenia) Nika Prevc	7	2023/24

=== Consecutive wins ===
Rank		Wins	Season
1	(Slovenia) Nika Prevc	10	2024/25
1	(Japan) Sara Takanashi	10	2015/16
3	(Japan) Sara Takanashi	7	2013/14
4	(Norway) Maren Lundby	6	2017/18
4	(Norway) Maren Lundby	6	2018/19
4	(Slovenia) Nika Prevc	6	2025/26
7	(Japan) Sara Takanashi	5	2015, 2016
7	(Japan) Sara Takanashi	5	2016, 2017
7	(Austria) Marita Kramer	5	2021, 2022
10	(Japan) Sara Takanashi	4	2012/13
10	(Japan) Sara Takanashi	4	2013/14
10	(Japan) Sara Takanashi	4	2013/14
10	(Austria) Chiara Kreuzer	4	2019/20
10	(Austria) Marita Kramer	4	2021/22

=== Top 10 appearances ===
Rank		Top 10s
1	(Japan) Sara Takanashi	224
2	(Germany) Katharina Schmid	174
3	(Japan) Yūki Itō	154
4	(Slovenia) Nika Vodan	120
5	(Austria) Daniela Iraschko-Stolz	118
6	(Norway) Maren Lundby	110
7	(Austria) Eva Pinkelnig	109
8	(Slovenia) Ema Klinec	107
8	(Austria) Jacqueline Seifriedsberger	107
10	(Norway) Anna Odine Strøm	91
11	(Austria) Chiara Kreuzer	85
12	(Slovenia) Nika Prevc	81
13	(Germany) Carina Vogt	79
14	(Germany) Selina Freitag	73

=== Average points per season ===
Rank		Points	Season
1	(Japan) Sara Takanashi	95.56	2013/14
2	(Japan) Sara Takanashi	94.71	2015/16
3	(Norway) Maren Lundby	93.84	2017/18
4	(United States) Sarah Hendrickson	89.92	2011/12
5	(Slovenia) Nika Prevc	81.09	2025/26
6	(Japan) Sara Takanashi	81.06	2012/13

=== Podiums ===
Rank		Podiums
1	(Japan) Sara Takanashi	116
2	(Norway) Maren Lundby	62
3	(Germany) Katharina Schmid	61
4	(Slovenia) Nika Prevc	60
5	(Austria) Daniela Iraschko-Stolz	53
6	(Austria) Eva Pinkelnig	47
7	(Slovenia) Ema Klinec	31
7	(Norway) Eirin Maria Kvandal	31
9	(Slovenia) Nika Vodan	30
10	(Japan) Yūki Itō	29
10	(Norway) Anna Odine Strøm	29
12	(United States) Sarah Hendrickson	25
13	(Austria) Marita Kramer	23
13	(Austria) Jacqueline Seifriedsberger	23
15	(Germany) Carina Vogt	22
16	(Norway) Silje Opseth	21
16	(Japan) Nozomi Maruyama	21
18	(Austria) Chiara Kreuzer	20
18	(Germany) Selina Freitag	20
20	(Austria) Lisa Eder	16
21	(Slovenia) Urša Bogataj	14
22	(Germany) Juliane Seyfarth	13
23	(Russia) Irina Avvakumova	12

=== Podiums per season ===
Rank		Podiums	Season
1	(Slovenia) Nika Prevc	28	2025/26
2	(Slovenia) Nika Prevc	19	2024/25
2	(Norway) Maren Lundby	19	2018/19
2	(Japan) Nozomi Maruyama	19	2025/26
5	(Japan) Sara Takanashi	18	2013/14
5	(Austria) Eva Pinkelnig	18	2022/23
7	(Japan) Sara Takanashi	16	2015/16
8	(Norway) Maren Lundby	15	2017/18
8	(Japan) Sara Takanashi	15	2016/17
10	(Germany) Katharina Althaus	13	2018/19
10	(Germany) Juliane Seyfarth	13	2018/19
10	(Japan) Sara Takanashi	13	2012/13
10	(Austria) Eva Pinkelnig	13	2023/24
10	(Norway) Anna Odine Strøm	13	2025/26
14	(United States) Sarah Hendrickson	12	2011/12
14	(Norway) Maren Lundby	12	2019/20
14	(Austria) Chiara Kreuzer	12	2019/20
14	(Slovenia) Nika Prevc	12	2023/24

=== Overall leader (in yellow) by total events ===
Rank	Total days in yellow jersey	Events
1	(Japan) Sara Takanashi	76
2	(Slovenia) Nika Prevc	54
3	(Norway) Maren Lundby	40
4	(Austria) Marita Kramer	25
5	(Austria) Eva Pinkelnig	24
6	(Germany) Katharina Schmid	22
7	(United States) Sarah Hendrickson	14
8	(Japan) Nozomi Maruyama	12
9	(Austria) Daniela Iraschko-Stolz	9
10	(France) Joséphine Pagnier	5
10	(Austria) Chiara Kreuzer	5
12	(Slovenia) Nika Vodan	4
13	(Slovenia) Špela Rogelj	2
14	(Japan) Yūki Itō	1
14	(Slovenia) Ema Klinec	1
14	(Norway) Silje Opseth	1

=== Most points in a season ===
Rank		Points	Season
1	(Slovenia) Nika Prevc	2676	2025/26
2	(Slovenia) Nika Prevc	1933	2024/25
3	(Norway) Maren Lundby	1909	2018/19
4	(Japan) Nozomi Maruyama	1870	2025/26
5	(Japan) Sara Takanashi	1720	2013/14
6	(Austria) Eva Pinkelnig	1662	2022/23
7	(Norway) Anna Odine Strøm	1628	2025/26
8	(Japan) Sara Takanashi	1610	2015/16
9	(Germany) Katharina Schmid	1493	2018/19
10	(Japan) Sara Takanashi	1455	2016/17
11	(Slovenia) Nika Prevc	1454	2023/24
12	(Germany) Juliane Seyfarth	1451	2018/19
13	(Austria) Lisa Eder	1417	2025/26
14	(Norway) Maren Lundby	1340	2017/18

== Team events ==
=== Individual team wins ===
(includes team, super team & mixed-team events)

Rank		Team wins
1	(Austria) Stefan Kraft	18
2	(Austria) Gregor Schlierenzauer	17
3	(Austria) Thomas Morgenstern	16
4	(Austria) Andreas Kofler	15
5	(Norway) Johann André Forfang	14
6	(Norway) Daniel-André Tande	13
7	(Slovenia) Peter Prevc	12
	(Austria) Michael Hayböck	12
	(Austria) Jan Hörl	12

=== Men's team ===
Rank	after 125 events	1st	2nd	3rd	Total
1	Austria	43	25	26	94
2	Norway	28	22	21	71
3	Germany	16	30	23	69
4	Finland	15	13	9	37
5	Slovenia	12	11	15	38
6	Poland	7	13	12	32
7	Japan	4	11	15	30
8	Russia	0	1	2	3
9	Switzerland	0	0	1	1

=== Men's super team ===
Rank	after 9 events	1st	2nd	3rd	Total
1	Austria	3	4	2	9
2	Slovenia	3	3	0	6
3	Germany	2	1	1	4
4	Poland	1	0	1	2
5	Norway	0	1	2	3
6	Japan	0	0	2	2
7	Finland	0	0	1	1

=== Women's team ===
Rank	after 9 events	1st	2nd	3rd	Total
1	Austria	4	1	2	7
2	Japan	2	1	1	4
3	Germany	2	0	1	3
4	Slovenia	1	4	1	6
5	Russia	0	2	1	3
6	Norway	0	1	2	3
7	France	0	0	1	1

=== Women's super team ===
Rank	after 3 event	1st	2nd	3rd	Total
1	Austria	1	0	2	3
2	Germany	1	0	1	2
3	Slovenia	1	0	0	1
4	Norway	0	2	0	2
5	Canada	0	1	0	1

=== Mixed team ===
Rank	after 13 events	1st	2nd	3rd	Total
1	Norway	5	3	3	11
2	Slovenia	3	2	0	5
3	Austria	1	4	6	11
4	Germany	2	2	2	6
5	Japan	2	2	1	5
6	Italy	0	0	1	1

- updated: 20 November 2026

== Various ==
=== Youngest winners ===
Rank		Age
1	(Canada) Steve Collins	15 years, 362 days
2	(Austria) Thomas Morgenstern	16 years, 73 days
3	(Finland) Toni Nieminen	16 years, 184 days
4	(Finland) Janne Ahonen	16 years, 222 days
5	(Austria) Gregor Schlierenzauer	16 years, 330 days

=== Oldest winners ===
Rank		Age
1	(Japan) Noriaki Kasai	42 years, 176 days
2	(Japan) Takanobu Okabe	38 years, 135 days
3	(Switzerland) Gregor Deschwanden	35 years, 15 days
4	(Slovenia) Robert Kranjec	34 years, 246 days
5	(Germany) Pius Paschke	34 years, 209 days

=== Youngest on podium ===
Rank		Age
1	(Canada) Steve Collins	15 years, 362 days
2	(Czech Republic) Jakub Sucháček	16 years, 63 days
3	(Austria) Thomas Morgenstern	16 years, 73 days
4	(Finland) Toni Nieminen	16 years, 184 days
5	(Slovenia) Domen Prevc	16 years, 198 days

=== Oldest on podium ===
Rank		Age
1	(Japan) Noriaki Kasai	44 years, 293 days
2	(Austria) Manuel Fettner	40 years, 208 days
3	(Japan) Takanobu Okabe	38 years, 135 days
4	(Switzerland) Simon Ammann	36 years, 202 days
5	(Poland) Piotr Żyła	36 years, 75 days

=== Consecutive wins ===
Rank		Wins	Season
1	(Finland) Janne Ahonen	6	2004/05
	(Finland) Matti Hautamäki	6	2004/05
	(Austria) Thomas Morgenstern	6	2007/08
	(Austria) Gregor Schlierenzauer	6	2008/09
	(Japan) Ryōyū Kobayashi	6	2018/19
	(Slovenia) Domen Prevc	6	2025/26
7	(Austria) Andreas Goldberger	5	1994/95
	(Poland) Adam Małysz	5	2000/01
	(Germany) Sven Hannawald	5	2001/02
	(Norway) Halvor Egner Granerud	5	2020/21
	(Slovenia) Domen Prevc	5	2025/26
12	(Norway) Ole Bremseth	4	1981/82
	(East Germany) Jens Weißflog	4	1983/84
	(Austria) Andreas Felder	4	1984/85
	(Norway) Espen Bredesen	4	1993, 94
	(Germany) Martin Schmitt	4	1999/00
	(Austria) Thomas Morgenstern	4	2010/11
	(Finland) Janne Ahonen	4	2004/05
	(Austria) Gregor Schlierenzauer	4	2007/08
	(Slovenia) Peter Prevc	4	2015/16
	(Germany) Severin Freund	4	2014/15
	(Poland) Kamil Stoch	4	2016/17
	(Poland) Kamil Stoch	4	2017/18
	(Switzerland) Simon Ammann	4	2009/10
	(Japan) Ryōyū Kobayashi	4	2021/22
	(Norway) Halvor Egner Granerud	4	2022/23
	(Austria) Stefan Kraft	4	2023/24

=== Consecutive podiums ===
Rank		Podiums	Season
1	(Finland) Janne Ahonen	13	2004/05
2	(Slovenia) Peter Prevc	12	2015/16
	(Norway) Halvor Egner Granerud	12	2022/23
	(Slovenia) Domen Prevc	12	2025/26
5	(Poland) Dawid Kubacki	10	2019/20
	(Poland) Dawid Kubacki	10	2022/23
	(Austria) Stefan Kraft	10	2023, 24
8	(Finland) Matti Nykänen	9	1986, 87
	(Austria) Gregor Schlierenzauer	9	2008/09
	(Austria) Stefan Kraft	9	2016/17
11	(Austria) Thomas Morgenstern	8	2007/08
	(Austria) Gregor Schlierenzauer	8	2008, 09
13	(East Germany) Jens Weißflog	7	1983/84
	(Norway) Espen Bredesen	7	1993, 94
	(Austria) Andreas Goldberger	7	1994/95
	(Germany) Sven Hannawald	7	2001/02
	(Switzerland) Simon Ammann	7	2008/09
	(Austria) Daniel Tschofenig	7	2024/25

=== Wins in a season ===
Rank		Wins	Season
1	(Slovenia) Peter Prevc	15	2015/16
2	(Slovenia) Domen Prevc	14	2025/26
3	(Austria) Gregor Schlierenzauer	13	2008/09
	(Japan) Ryōyū Kobayashi	13	2018/19
	(Austria) Stefan Kraft	13	2023/24
6	(Finland) Janne Ahonen	12	2004/05
	(Norway) Halvor Egner Granerud	12	2022/23
8	(Germany) Martin Schmitt	11	1999/00
	(Poland) Adam Małysz	11	2000/01
	(Norway) Halvor Egner Granerud	11	2020/21

=== Podiums in a season ===
Rank		Podiums	Season
1	(Slovenia) Peter Prevc	22	2015/16
	(Slovenia) Domen Prevc	22	2025/26
3	(Japan) Ryōyū Kobayashi	21	2018/19
4	(Austria) Gregor Schlierenzauer	20	2008/09
	(Austria) Stefan Kraft	20	2023/24
6	(Germany) Martin Schmitt	18	1998/99
	(Norway) Halvor Egner Granerud	18	2022/23

=== Most points in a season ===
Rank		Points	Season
1	(Slovenia) Peter Prevc	2303	2015/16
2	(Austria) Stefan Kraft	2149	2023/24
3	(Slovenia) Domen Prevc	2148	2025/26
4	(Norway) Halvor Egner Granerud	2128	2022/23
5	(Japan) Ryōyū Kobayashi	2085	2018/19

=== Most points in a season to 1992/93 ===
Rank		Points	Season
1	(Finland) Ari-Pekka Nikkola	287	1989/90
2	(Finland) Matti Nykänen	282	1987/88
3	(Finland) Matti Nykänen	270	1982/83
4	(Finland) Toni Nieminen	269	1991/92
5	(Austria) Andreas Felder	260	1990/91

=== Most points in a ski flying season ===
Rank		Points	Season
1	(Austria) Gregor Schlierenzauer	544	2012/13
2	(Slovenia) Peter Prevc	530	2015/16
3	(Slovenia) Domen Prevc	485	2024/25
4	(Austria) Stefan Kraft	480	2022/23
5	(Austria) Gregor Schlierenzauer	477	2008/09

=== Highest win rate in a season ===
Rank		Procent	Season
1	(Poland) Adam Małysz	52,4%	2000/01
2	(Slovenia) Peter Prevc	51,7%	2015/16
3	(Finland) Matti Nykänen	50,0%	1987/88
4	(Slovenia) Domen Prevc	48,3%	2025/26
5	(Austria) Gregor Schlierenzauer	48,1%	2008/09

=== Highest podium rate in a season ===
Rank		Procent	Season
1	(Slovenia) Peter Prevc	75,9%	2015/16
	(Slovenia) Domen Prevc	75,9%	2025/26
3	(Japan) Ryōyū Kobayashi	75,0%	2018/19
4	(Austria) Gregor Schlierenzauer	74,1%	2008/09
5	(Austria) Andreas Goldberger	71,4%	1994/95

=== Average points per competition ===
Rank		Points	Season
1	(Slovenia) Peter Prevc	79.41	2015/16
2	(Austria) Gregor Schlierenzauer	77.15	2008/09
3	(Austria) Andreas Goldberger	74.81	1994/95
4	(Japan) Ryōyū Kobayashi	74.46	2018/19
5	(Slovenia) Domen Prevc	74.06	2025/26

=== Average points per competition to 1992/93 ===
Rank		Points	Season
1	(Finland) Matti Nykänen	14.10	1987/88
2	(Finland) Toni Nieminen	12.80	1991/92
3	(Sweden) Jan Boklöv	12.35	1988/89
4	(Austria) Andreas Goldberger	12.11	1992/93
5	(Finland) Ari-Pekka Nikkola	11.48	1989/90

=== Highest overall advantage ===
Rank		Points	Season
1	(Slovenia) Domen Prevc	954	2025/26
2	(Slovenia) Peter Prevc	813	2015/16
3	(Japan) Ryōyū Kobayashi	736	2018/19
4	(Austria) Andreas Goldberger	636	1994/95
5	(Austria) Gregor Schlierenzauer	621	2012/13

=== Highest overall advantage to 1992/93 ===
Rank		Points	Season
1	(Finland) Matti Nykänen	95	1987/88
2	(Sweden) Jan Boklöv	55	1988/89
3	(Austria) Andreas Felder	54	1990/91
4	(Finland) Ari-Pekka Nikkola	48	1989/90
5	(Finland) Toni Nieminen	40	1991/92

=== Career total points ===
Rank		Total points
1	(Austria) Stefan Kraft	16,197
2	(Finland) Janne Ahonen	15,758
3	(Poland) Kamil Stoch	13,900
4	(Poland) Adam Małysz	13,070
5	(Switzerland) Simon Ammann	12,886

=== Individual starts ===
Rank		Starts
1	(Japan) Noriaki Kasai	579
2	(Switzerland) Simon Ammann	533
3	(Poland) Kamil Stoch	484
4	(Finland) Janne Ahonen	412
5	(Poland) Piotr Żyła	407

=== Overall leader (in yellow) by total events ===
All seasons included (yellow jersey introduced in 1988/89 season).

Rank		Events
1	(Finland) Janne Ahonen	73
2	(Finland) Matti Nykänen	62
3	(Austria) Stefan Kraft	59
4	(Austria) Thomas Morgenstern	52
5	(Japan) Ryōyū Kobayashi	48
6	(Poland) Adam Małysz	46
7	(Germany) Martin Schmitt	45
8	(Austria) Gregor Schlierenzauer	44
9	(Austria) Hubert Neuper	38
	(Switzerland) Simon Ammann	38
11	(Austria) Andreas Felder	37
	(Poland) Kamil Stoch	37
. . . . . . . . . . . . . . . . . . . .
	(Slovenia) Domen Prevc	32

=== Ski flying leader by total events ===
Rank		Events
1	(Austria) Gregor Schlierenzauer	16
2	(Austria) Stefan Kraft	13
3	(Slovenia) Robert Kranjec	9
	(Slovenia) Domen Prevc	9
5	(Slovenia) Peter Prevc	7

updated: 29 March 2026

== World Cup winners by nation ==
The table below lists those nations which have won at least one World Cup race (correct as of 22 November 2026).

=== Men ===
Rank	Nation	Total	FH	LH	NH
1	Austria	302	50	209	43
2	Norway	153	18	117	18
3	Finland	151	15	102	34
4	Germany	139	15	109	15
5	Japan	104	12	77	15
6	Poland	99	12	83	4
7	Slovenia	96	31	64	1
8	Switzerland	34	1	31	2
9	East Germany	28	—	20	8
10	Czechoslovakia (4CZE / 1SVK)	19	—	12	7
11	Czech Republic	17	3	14	—
12	Canada	14	—	6	8
13	Yugoslavia (all Slovenes)	10	—	6	4
14	Sweden	7	1	5	1
	Italy	7	—	4	3
16	West Germany	6	—	5	1
17	United States	3	—	3	—
18	France	1	—	1	—
	Russia	1	—	1	—
	Total	1191	158	869	164

- after 1178 individual events (13 double wins).

=== Men's team ===
Rank	Nation	Total	FH	LH	NH
1	Austria	43	9	33	1
2	Norway	28	8	20	—
3	Germany	16	2	14	—
4	Finland	15	4	10	1
5	Slovenia	12	5	7	—
6	Poland	7	1	6	—
7	Japan	4	—	4	—
	Total	125	29	94	2

- after 125 men's team events.

=== Men's super team ===
Rank	Nation	Total	FH	LH	NH
1	Slovenia	3	1	2	—
	Austria	3	—	3	—
3	Germany	2	—	1	1
4	Poland	1	—	1	—
	Total	9	1	7	1

- after 9 men's super team events.

=== Women ===
Rank	Nation	Total	FH	LH	NH
1	Japan	79	—	18	61
2	Austria	60	—	20	40
3	Slovenia	53	2	27	24
	Norway	54	3	26	25
5	Germany	25	—	8	17
6	United States	13	—	1	12
7	France	4	—	2	2
8	Canada	3	—	2	1
9	Russia	2	—	—	2
10	Switzerland	1	—	—	1
	Total	294	5	104	185

- after 292 individual events (2 double wins).

=== Women's team ===
Rank	Nation	Total	LH	NH
1	Austria	3	—	3
2	Japan	2	—	2
	Germany	2	—	2
4	Slovenia	1	—	1
	Total	8	—	8

- after 8 women's team events.

=== Women's super team ===
Rank	Nation	Total	FH	LH	NH
1	Austria	1	—	—	1
	Slovenia	1	—	—	1
	Germany	1	—	—	1
	Total	3	—	—	3

- after 3 women's super team events.

=== Mixed team ===
Rank	Nation	Total	LH	NH
1	Norway	5	3	2
2	Slovenia	3	3	—
	Germany	2	2	—
	Japan	2	1	1
5	Austria	1	1	—
	Total	13	10	3

- after 13 mixed events.

those countries no longer exist

== Hosts ==
=== Men ===
Rank	Nation	Total	FH	LH	NH
1	(Socialist Federal Republic of Yugoslavia) (Slovenia) Planica	84	55	18	11
2	(Japan) Sapporo	82	—	67	15
3	(West Germany) (Germany) Oberstdorf	75	26	49	—
4	(Switzerland) Engelberg	72	—	72	—
5	(Finland) Lahti	67	—	44	23
6	(Norway) Lillehammer	51	—	44	7
7	(Austria) Bischofshofen	50	—	50	—
8	(Poland) Zakopane	49	—	48	1
9	(Norway) Holmenkollen	48	—	46	2
10	(West Germany) (Germany) Garmisch-Pa	47	—	47	—
11	(Austria) Innsbruck	45	—	45	—
12	(Germany) Willingen	44	—	44	—
13	(Finland) Ruka (Kuusamo)	37	—	37	—
14	(Austria) Tauplitz (Bad Mitterndorf)	32	32	—	—
15	(Norway) Vikersund	31	31	—	—
16	(Czechoslovakia) (Czech Republic) Harrachov	30	11	18	1
17	(Canada) Thunder Bay	28	—	13	15
18	(Norway) Trondheim	27	—	26	1
19	(Finland) Kuopio	25	—	21	4
	(Germany) Titisee-Neustadt	25	—	25	—
21	(United States) Lake Placid	24	—	16	8
22	(Sweden) Falun	21	—	13	8
23	(Italy) Predazzo (Val di Fiemme)	20	—	13	7
24	(East Germany) (Germany) Klingenthal	19	—	19	—
25	(Poland) Wisła	18	—	18	—
26	(Russia) Nizhny Tagil	14	—	14	—
27	(Czechoslovakia) (Czech Republic) Liberec	12	—	11	1
28	(Czechoslovakia) Štrbské Pleso	9	—	6	3
	(Switzerland) St. Moritz	9	—	—	9
30	(France) Chamonix	8	—	—	8
31	(Switzerland) Gstaad	6	—	—	6
	(Sweden) Örnsköldsvik	6	—	—	6
	(Japan) Hakuba	6	—	6	—
	(Austria) Villach	6	—	—	6
35	(Italy) Cortina d'Ampezzo	5	—	—	5
	(East Germany) (Germany) Oberhof	5	—	3	2
37	(United States) Iron Mountain	4	—	4	—
	(Romania) Râșnov	4	—	—	4
39	(France) St. Nizier	3	—	3	—
	(Italy) Pragelato	3	—	3	—
41	(United States) Ironwood	2	2	—	—
	(Norway) Bærum	2	—	2	—
	(Socialist Federal Republic of Yugoslavia) Sarajevo	2	—	1	1
	(East Germany) Oberwiesenthal	2	—	—	2
	(United States) Park City	2	—	2	—
	(Canada) Whistler	2	—	2	—
	(Russia) Sochi	2	—	—	2
	(Kazakhstan) Almaty	2	—	2	—
	(South Korea) Pyeongchang	2	—	1	1
50	(Italy) Gallio	1	—	—	1
	(Norway) Meldal	1	—	1	—
	(Sweden) Sollefteå	1	—	1	—
	(Norway) Raufoss	1	—	—	1
	(Sweden) Bollnäs	1	—	—	1
	(Germany) Ruhpolding	1	—	1	—
	(France) Courchevel	1	—	1	—
	(Austria) Murau	1	—	1	—
	(Austria) Ramsau	1	—	—	1
	Total	1178	157	858	163

=== Mixed ===
Rank	Nation	Total	FH	LH	NH
1	(Norway) Lillehammer	5	—	3	2
	(Germany) Willingen	4	—	4	—
3	(Romania) Râșnov	1	—	—	1
	(Norway) Oslo	1	—	1	—
	(Germany) Titisee-Neustadt	1	—	1	—
	(United States) Lake Placid	1	—	1	—
	Total	13	—	10	3

=== Men's super team ===
Rank	Nation	Total	FH	LH	NH
1	(United States) Lake Placid	2	—	2	—
	(Finland) Lahti	2	—	2	—
3	(Poland) Wisła	1	—	1	—
	(Romania) Râșnov	1	—	—	1
	(Germany) Oberstdorf	1	1	—	—
	(Germany) Titisee-Neustadt	1	—	1	—
	(Poland) Zakopane	1	—	1	—
	Total	9	1	7	1

updated: 22 November 2026

=== Women ===
Rank	Nation	Total	FH	LH	NH
1	(Norway) Lillehammer	34	—	20	14
2	(Austria) Hinzenbach	29	—	—	29
3	(Slovenia) Ljubno	26	—	—	26
4	(Japan) Zaō	25	—	—	25
5	(Japan) Sapporo	24	—	12	12
6	(Norway) Holmenkollen	17	—	16	1
7	(Romania) Râșnov	16	—	—	16
8	(Germany) Oberstdorf	15	—	9	6
9	(Russia) Nizhny Tagil	10	—	—	10
10	(Germany) Hinterzarten	9	—	2	7
	(Germany) Willingen	9	—	9	—
12	(Finland) Lahti	7	—	6	1
13	(Russia) Chaykovsky	6	—	2	4
	(Austria) Villach	6	—	—	6
15	(Germany) Klingenthal	5	—	5	—
	(Switzerland) Engelberg	5	—	5	—
	(Slovenia) Planica	5	1	1	3
18	(Norway) Trondheim	4	—	2	2
	(Poland) Wisła	4	—	4	—
	(China) Zhangjiakou	4	—	2	2
	(Norway) Vikersund	4	4	—	—
22	(Austria) Ramsau	3	—	—	3
	(Germany) Titisee-Neustadt	3	—	3	—
	(Sweden) Falun	3	—	1	2
	(Germany) Garmisch-Pa	3	—	3	—
26	(Italy) Predazzo	2	—	—	2
	(Germany) Schonach	2	—	—	2
	(Russia) Sochi	2	—	—	2
	(Kazakhstan) Almaty	2	—	—	2
	(South Korea) Pyeongchang	2	—	—	2
	(France) Prémanon	2	—	—	2
	(Germany) Oberhof	2	—	—	2
	(United States) Lake Placid	2	—	2	—
	Total	292	5	104	183

=== Men's team ===
Rank	Nation	Total	FH	LH	NH
1	(Finland) Lahti	24	—	23	1
	(Slovenia) Planica	24	20	4	—
3	(Germany) Willingen	17	—	17	—
4	(Poland) Zakopane	13	—	13	—
5	(Finland) Ruka	7	—	7	—
	(Norway) Holmenkollen	7	—	7	—
7	(Germany) Oberstdorf	5	5	—	—
	(Germany) Klingenthal	5	—	5	—
	(Poland) Wisła	5	—	5	—
10	(Norway) Vikersund	4	4	—	—
11	(Italy) Predazzo	2	—	2	—
	(Finland) Kuopio	2	—	2	—
13	(Japan) Sapporo	1	—	1	—
	(Czech Republic) Harrachov	1	—	1	—
	(Canada) Thunder Bay	1	—	1	—
	(Norway) Trondheim	1	—	1	—
	(Japan) Hakuba	1	—	1	—
	(Austria) Villach	1	—	—	1
	(Italy) Pragelato	1	—	1	—
	(United States) Park City	1	—	1	—
	(Germany) Titisee-Neustadt	1	—	1	—
	(Austria) Bischofshofen	1	—	1	—
	Total	125	29	94	2

=== Women's team ===
Rank	Nation	Total	FH	LH	NH
1	(Japan) Zaō	3	—	—	3
	(Slovenia) Ljubno	3	—	—	3
3	(Germany) Hinterzarten	1	—	—	1
	(Russia) Chaykovsky	1	—	1	—
	(Austria) Hinzenbach	1	—	—	1
	Total	9	—	1	8

=== Women's super team ===
Rank	Nation	Total	FH	LH	NH
1	(Japan) Zaō	3	—	—	3
	Total	3	—	—	3

== Timeline calendar ==
Season	Men's Individual				Men's Team				Women's Individual				Women's Team			Mixed Team			Men's Super team				Women's Super team		
Season	FH	LH	NH	Total	FH	LH	NH	Total	FH	LH	NH	Total	LH	NH	Total	LH	NH	Total	FH	LH	NH	Total	LH	NH	Total
1979/80	1	16	8	25	–	–	–	–	–	–	–	–	–	–	–	–	–	–	–	–	–	–	–	–	–
1980/81	2	14	8	24	–	–	–	–	–	–	–	–	–	–	–	–	–	–	–	–	–	–	–	–	–
1981/82	3	10	9	22	–	–	–	–	–	–	–	–	–	–	–	–	–	–	–	–	–	–	–	–	–
1982/83	3	15	7	25	–	–	–	–	–	–	–	–	–	–	–	–	–	–	–	–	–	–	–	–	–
1983/84	2	14	8	24	–	–	–	–	–	–	–	–	–	–	–	–	–	–	–	–	–	–	–	–	–
1984/85	1	12	8	21	–	–	–	–	–	–	–	–	–	–	–	–	–	–	–	–	–	–	–	–	–
1985/86	2	14	9	25	–	–	–	–	–	–	–	–	–	–	–	–	–	–	–	–	–	–	–	–	–
1986/87	2	10	10	22	–	–	–	–	–	–	–	–	–	–	–	–	–	–	–	–	–	–	–	–	–
1987/88	–	12	8	20	–	–	–	–	–	–	–	–	–	–	–	–	–	–	–	–	–	–	–	–	–
1988/89	1	11	8	20	–	–	–	–	–	–	–	–	–	–	–	–	–	–	–	–	–	–	–	–	–
1989/90	–	16	9	25	–	–	–	–	–	–	–	–	–	–	–	–	–	–	–	–	–	–	–	–	–
1990/91	4	13	5	22	–	–	–	–	–	–	–	–	–	–	–	–	–	–	–	–	–	–	–	–	–
1991/92	3	12	6	21	–	2	–	2	–	–	–	–	–	–	–	–	–	–	–	–	–	–	–	–	–
1992/93	2	13	2	17	–	2	–	2	–	–	–	–	–	–	–	–	–	–	–	–	–	–	–	–	–
1993/94	1	11	7	19	–	2	–	2	–	–	–	–	–	–	–	–	–	–	–	–	–	–	–	–	–
1994/95	3	11	7	21	–	1	–	1	–	–	–	–	–	–	–	–	–	–	–	–	–	–	–	–	–
1995/96	3	16	9	28	–	4	–	4	–	–	–	–	–	–	–	–	–	–	–	–	–	–	–	–	–
1996/97	4	19	2	25	–	1	–	1	–	–	–	–	–	–	–	–	–	–	–	–	–	–	–	–	–
1997/98	4	19	4	27	–	–	–	–	–	–	–	–	–	–	–	–	–	–	–	–	–	–	–	–	–
1998/99	3	23	3	29	–	1	–	1	–	–	–	–	–	–	–	–	–	–	–	–	–	–	–	–	–
1999/00	2	22	2	26	1	2	–	3	–	–	–	–	–	–	–	–	–	–	–	–	–	–	–	–	–
2000/01	5	16	–	21	1	3	–	4	–	–	–	–	–	–	–	–	–	–	–	–	–	–	–	–	–
2001/02	–	21	1	22	1	3	1	5	–	–	–	–	–	–	–	–	–	–	–	–	–	–	–	–	–
2002/03	4	23	–	27	1	1	–	2	–	–	–	–	–	–	–	–	–	–	–	–	–	–	–	–	–
2003/04	1	22	–	23	–	2	–	2	–	–	–	–	–	–	–	–	–	–	–	–	–	–	–	–	–
2004/05	4	24	–	28	–	3	–	3	–	–	–	–	–	–	–	–	–	–	–	–	–	–	–	–	–
2005/06	2	20	–	22	–	2	–	2	–	–	–	–	–	–	–	–	–	–	–	–	–	–	–	–	–
2006/07	4	20	–	24	–	2	–	2	–	–	–	–	–	–	–	–	–	–	–	–	–	–	–	–	–
2007/08	3	22	2	27	1	2	–	3	–	–	–	–	–	–	–	–	–	–	–	–	–	–	–	–	–
2008/09	6	20	1	27	3	3	–	6	–	–	–	–	–	–	–	–	–	–	–	–	–	–	–	–	–
2009/10	3	20	–	23	1	3	–	4	–	–	–	–	–	–	–	–	–	–	–	–	–	–	–	–	–
2010/11	7	19	–	26	2	3	–	5	–	–	–	–	–	–	–	–	–	–	–	–	–	–	–	–	–
2011/12	5	19	2	26	2	3	1	6	–	–	13	13	–	–	–	–	–	–	–	–	–	–	–	–	–
2012/13	7	17	3	27	2	4	–	6	–	1	15	16	–	–	–	–	1	1	–	–	–	–	–	–	–
2013/14	2	25	1	28	–	4	–	4	–	2	16	18	–	–	–	–	1	1	–	–	–	–	–	–	–
2014/15	5	25	1	31	1	4	–	5	–	1	12	13	–	–	–	–	–	–	–	–	–	–	–	–	–
2015/16	6	20	3	29	1	5	–	6	–	1	16	17	–	–	–	–	–	–	–	–	–	–	–	–	–
2016/17	5	20	1	26	2	4	–	6	–	3	16	19	–	–	–	–	–	–	–	–	–	–	–	–	–
2017/18	4	18	–	22	2	6	–	8	–	2	13	15	–	2	2	–	–	–	–	–	–	–	–	–	–
2018/19	6	22	–	28	2	5	–	7	–	9	15	24	–	2	2	–	–	–	–	–	–	–	–	–	–
2019/20	2	21	4	27	–	5	–	5	–	9	7	16	–	2	2	–	–	–	–	–	–	–	–	–	–
2020/21	3	21	1	25	1	3	–	4	–	3	10	13	–	2	2	–	1	1	–	–	–	–	–	–	–
2021/22	4	24	–	28	1	4	–	5	–	9	10	19	–	1	1	2	–	2	–	–	–	–	–	–	–
2022/23	6	25	1	32	1	2	–	3	–	15	11	26	–	–	–	2	–	2	–	1	1	2	–	1	1
2023/24	6	24	2	32	1	2	–	3	1	13	10	24	–	–	–	–	–	–	1	2	–	3	–	1	1
2024/25	6	23	–	29	1	1	–	2	1	13	10	24	–	–	–	3	–	3	–	2	–	2	–	1	1
2025/26	5	23	1	29	1	–	–	1	3	21	9	33	–	–	–	2	–	2	–	2	–	2	–	–	–
2026/27		1	–	1			–			2		2	–	–	–	1	–	1	–	–	–	–	–	–	–
Events	157	858	163	1178	29	94	2	125	5	104	183	292	–	9	9	10	3	13	1	7	1	9	–	3	3
Double wins	1	11	1	13	–	–	–	–	–	–	2	2	–	–	–	–	–	–	–	–	–	–	–	–	–
Winners	158	869	164	1191	29	94	2	125	5	104	185	294	–	9	9	10	3	13	1	7	1	9	–	3	3

Last updated: 22 November 2026

== World Cup finals ==
=== Men ===
- 1980 — (Czechoslovakia) Štrbské Pleso
- 1981 — (Socialist Federal Republic of Yugoslavia) Planica
- 1982 — (Socialist Federal Republic of Yugoslavia) Planica
- 1983 — (Socialist Federal Republic of Yugoslavia) Planica
- 1984 — (Socialist Federal Republic of Yugoslavia) Planica
- 1985 — (Czechoslovakia) Štrbské Pleso
- 1986 — (Socialist Federal Republic of Yugoslavia) Planica
- 1987 — (Norway) Oslo
- 1988 — (Socialist Federal Republic of Yugoslavia) Planica
- 1989 — (Socialist Federal Republic of Yugoslavia) Planica
- 1990 — (Socialist Federal Republic of Yugoslavia) Planica
- 1991 — (Czechoslovakia) Štrbské Pleso (3)
- 1992 — (Slovenia) Planica
- 1993 — (Slovenia) Planica
- 1994 — (Canada) Thunder Bay
- 1995 — (Germany) Oberstdorf
- 1996 — (Norway) Oslo
- 1997 — (Slovenia) Planica
- 1998 — (Slovenia) Planica
- 1999 — (Slovenia) Planica
- 2000 — (Slovenia) Planica
- 2001 — (Slovenia) Planica
- 2002 — (Slovenia) Planica
- 2003 — (Slovenia) Planica
- 2004 — (Norway) Oslo
- 2005 — (Slovenia) Planica
- 2006 — (Slovenia) Planica
- 2007 — (Slovenia) Planica
- 2008 — (Slovenia) Planica
- 2009 — (Slovenia) Planica
- 2010 — (Norway) Oslo (4)
- 2011 — (Slovenia) Planica
- 2012 — (Slovenia) Planica
- 2013 — (Slovenia) Planica
- 2014 — (Slovenia) Planica
- 2015 — (Slovenia) Planica
- 2016 — (Slovenia) Planica
- 2017 — (Slovenia) Planica
- 2018 — (Slovenia) Planica
- 2019 — (Slovenia) Planica
- 2020 — (Norway) Trondheim
- 2021 — (Slovenia) Planica
- 2022 — (Slovenia) Planica
- 2023 — (Slovenia) Planica
- 2024 — (Slovenia) Planica
- 2025 — (Slovenia) Planica
- 2026 — (Slovenia) Planica (37)

=== Women ===
- 2012 — (Norway) Oslo
- 2013 — (Norway) Oslo
- 2014 — (Slovenia) Planica
- 2015 — (Norway) Oslo
- 2016 — (Kazakhstan) Almaty
- 2017 — (Norway) Oslo (4)
- 2018 — (Germany) Oberstdorf
- 2019 — (Russia) Chaykovsky
- 2020 — (Norway) Trondheim
- 2021 — (Russia) Chaykovsky (2)
- 2022 — (Germany) Oberhof
- 2023 — (Finland) Lahti
- 2024 — (Slovenia) Planica
- 2025 — (Finland) Lahti (2)
- 2026 — (Slovenia) Planica (3)

== World Cup all-time records ==
=== Men ===
Category	Name	Record
overall titles	(Poland) Adam Małysz (Finland) Matti Nykänen	4
consecutive overall titles	(Poland) Adam Małysz	3
overall podiums	(Finland) Janne Ahonen	8
consecutive overall podiums	(Austria) Armin Kogler (Finland) Matti Nykänen (Austria) Andreas Goldberger	4
ski flying titles	(Austria) Gregor Schlierenzauer (Slovenia) Peter Prevc (Austria) Stefan Kraft	3
ski flying title podiums	(Austria) Gregor Schlierenzauer (Austria) Stefan Kraft	5
individual wins	(Austria) Gregor Schlierenzauer	53
individual podiums	(Austria) Stefan Kraft	129
individual ski flying wins	(Austria) Gregor Schlierenzauer	14
individual ski flying podiums	(Austria) Stefan Kraft	25
team wins	(Austria) Stefan Kraft	18
team podiums	(Austria) Stefan Kraft	48
individual top 10s	(Finland) Janne Ahonen	248
individual ski flying top 10s	(Austria) Stefan Kraft	43
career total points	(Austria) Stefan Kraft	16197
most times winning individual points	(Japan) Noriaki Kasai	466x
consecutive wins	(Finland) Janne Ahonen (Finland) Matti Hautamäki (Austria) Thomas Morgenstern (Austria) Gregor Schlierenzauer (Japan) Ryōyū Kobayashi (Slovenia) Domen Prevc	6
consecutive podiums	(Finland) Janne Ahonen	13
wins in a single season (2015/16)	(Slovenia) Peter Prevc	15
ski flying wins in a single season	(Austria) Gregor Schlierenzauer (Slovenia) Peter Prevc (Austria) Stefan Kraft	4
podiums in a single season	(Slovenia) Peter Prevc (Slovenia) Domen Prevc	22
ski flying podiums in a single season	(Austria) Gregor Schlierenzauer (Austria) Stefan Kraft	6
overall points in a single season (2015/16)	(Slovenia) Peter Prevc	2303
overall points in a single season to 1992/93 (1989/90)	(Finland) Ari-Pekka Nikkola	287
points in a single ski flying season (2012/13)	(Austria) Gregor Schlierenzauer	544
highest win rate in a season (2000/01)	(Poland) Adam Małysz	52,4%
highest podium rate in a season	(Slovenia) Peter Prevc (Slovenia) Domen Prevc	75,9%
average points per competition in a season (2015/16)	(Slovenia) Peter Prevc	79.41
average points per competition in a season to 1992/93 (1987/88)	(Finland) Matti Nykänen	14.10
highest overall advantage in a season (2025/26)	(Slovenia) Domen Prevc	954
highest overall advantage in a season to 1992/93 (1987/88)	(Finland) Matti Nykänen	95
most wins in a calendar year (2001)	(Poland) Adam Małysz	17
most podiums in a calendar year (2001)	(Poland) Adam Małysz	22
most points in a calendar year (2001)	(Poland) Adam Małysz	2307
most wins at one venue (Lahti)	(Finland) Matti Nykänen	8
most wins on a large hill	(Austria) Gregor Schlierenzauer	36
most wins on a normal hill	(Finland) Matti Nykänen	15
youngest winner overall (1991/92)	(Finland) Toni Nieminen	16 years, 295 days
oldest winner overall (2023/24)	(Austria) Stefan Kraft	30 years, 309 days
youngest winner (Lahti '80)	(Canada) Steve Collins	15 years, 362 days
oldest winner (Ruka '14)	(Japan) Noriaki Kasai	42 years, 176 days
youngest jumper on podium	(Canada) Steve Collins	15 years, 362 days
oldest jumper on podium	(Japan) Noriaki Kasai	44 years, 293 days
youngest jumper in top 10	(Canada) Steve Collins	15 years, 289 days
oldest jumper in top 10	(Japan) Noriaki Kasai	46 years, 235 days
oldest jumper performing	(Japan) Noriaki Kasai	52 years, 255 days
individual performances	(Japan) Noriaki Kasai	579
team performances	(Japan) Noriaki Kasai	73
all performances	(Japan) Noriaki Kasai	652
# of seasons performing	(Japan) Noriaki Kasai	34
overall leader by total events	(Finland) Janne Ahonen	73
ski flying leader by total events	(Austria) Gregor Schlierenzauer	16
most points in a single competition (Ruka '23)	(Austria) Stefan Kraft	363.5
most points in a ski flying competition (2 rounds, Vikersund '11)	(Austria) Gregor Schlierenzauer (Norway) Johan Remen Evensen	498,6
win with the highest point advantage (Planica '87)	(Austria) Andreas Felder	47,5
longest time between first and last win	(Japan) Noriaki Kasai	22 years, 253 days
longest time between first and last podium	(Japan) Noriaki Kasai	25 years, 26 days

update: 29 March 2026

=== Women ===
Category	Name	Record
overall titles	(Japan) Sara Takanashi	4
consecutive overall titles	(Slovenia) Nika Prevc (Norway) Maren Lundby	3
overall podiums	(Japan) Sara Takanashi	8
consecutive overall podiums	(Japan) Sara Takanashi	7
individual wins	(Japan) Sara Takanashi	63
individual podiums	(Japan) Sara Takanashi	116
individual top 10s	(Japan) Sara Takanashi	224
career total points	(Japan) Sara Takanashi	15271
consecutive wins	(Japan) Sara Takanashi (Slovenia) Nika Prevc	10
consecutive podiums	(Japan) Sara Takanashi	27
wins in a single season (2025/26)	(Slovenia) Nika Prevc	18
podiums in a single season (2025/26)	(Slovenia) Nika Prevc	28
overall points in a single season (2025/26)	(Slovenia) Nika Prevc	2676
average points per competition in a season (2013/14)	(Japan) Sara Takanashi	95.56
highest overall advantage in a season (2013/14)	(Japan) Sara Takanashi	914
most wins at one venue (Hinzenbach)	(Japan) Sara Takanashi	8
youngest winner (Yamagata '12)	(Japan) Sara Takanashi	15 years, 147 days
oldest winner (Planica '24)	(Austria) Eva Pinkelnig	36 years, 224 days
youngest jumper on podium	(Germany) Gianina Ernst	14 years, 341 days
oldest jumper on podium	(Austria) Daniela Iraschko-Stolz	38 years, 5 days
individual performances	(Japan) Sara Takanashi	272
overall leader by total events	(Japan) Sara Takanashi	77
most points in a single competition (Lahti '25)	(Slovenia) Nika Prevc	328,8
most points in a ski flying competition (Vikersund '24)	(Norway) Eirin Maria Kvandal	431,2
win with the highest point advantage (Lahti '25)	(Slovenia) Nika Prevc	51,4
longest time between first and last win	(Austria) Jacqueline Seifriedsberger	11 years, 358 days

update: 28 March 2026

== One country podium sweep ==
=== Men ===
No.	Date	Place	Season	Winner	Second	Third
1	27 December 1979	Cortina d'Ampezzo	1979/80	(Austria) Toni Innauer	(Austria) Hubert Neuper	(Austria) Alfred Groyer
2	20 January 1980	Thunder Bay	1979/80	(Austria) Armin Kogler	(Austria) Hubert Neuper	(Austria) Toni Innauer
3	22 March 1980	Planica	1979/80	(Austria) Hubert Neuper	(Austria) Armin Kogler	(Austria) Hans Millonig
4	25 March 1980	Štrbské Pleso	1979/80	(Austria) Armin Kogler	(Austria) Hans Millonig	(Austria) Hubert Neuper
5	14 February 1981	Ironwood	1980/81	(Austria) Alois Lipburger	(Austria) Andreas Felder	(Austria) Fritz Koch
6	22 March 1982	Štrbské Pleso	1981/82	(Norway) Ole Bremseth	(Norway) Olav Hansson	(Norway) Johan Sætre
7	15 December 1990	Sapporo	1990/91	(Germany) André Kiesewetter	(Germany) Dieter Thoma	(Germany) Josef Heumann
8	2 March 1991	Lahti	1990/91	(Austria) Andreas Felder	(Austria) Heinz Kuttin	(Austria) Werner Haim
9	17 January 1992	St. Moritz	1991/92	(Austria) Andreas Felder	(Austria) Werner Rathmayr	(Austria) Martin Höllwarth
10	26 January 1992	Oberstdorf	1991/92	(Austria) Werner Rathmayr	(Austria) Andreas Felder	(Austria) Andreas Goldberger
11	1 January 1998	Garmisch-Partenkirchen	1997/98	(Japan) Kazuyoshi Funaki	(Japan) Masahiko Harada	(Japan) Hiroya Saitō
12	11 January 1998	Ramsau am Dachstein	1997/98	(Japan) Masahiko Harada	(Japan) Kazuyoshi Funaki	(Japan) Hiroya Saitō
13	1 March 1998	Vikersund	1997/98	(Japan) Takanobu Okabe	(Japan) Hiroya Saitō	(Japan) Noriaki Kasai
14	3 March 2001	Oberstdorf	2000/01	(Finland) Risto Jussilainen	(Finland) Veli-Matti Lindström	(Finland) Matti Hautamäki
15	24 January 2002	Hakuba	2001/02	(Austria) Andreas Widhölzl	(Austria) Martin Koch	(Austria) Stefan Horngacher
16	15 December 2002	Titisee-Neustadt	2002/03	(Austria) Martin Höllwarth	(Austria) Andreas Goldberger	(Austria) Andreas Kofler
17	28 January 2006	Zakopane	2005/06	(Finland) Matti Hautamäki	(Finland) Tami Kiuru	(Finland) Janne Ahonen
18	9 December 2007	Trondheim	2007/08	(Austria) Thomas Morgenstern	(Austria) Andreas Kofler	(Austria) Wolfgang Loitzl
19	31 January 2009	Sapporo	2008/09	(Austria) Gregor Schlierenzauer	(Austria) Thomas Morgenstern	(Austria) Wolfgang Loitzl
20	17 December 2010	Engelberg	2010/11	(Austria) Thomas Morgenstern	(Austria) Andreas Kofler	(Austria) Wolfgang Loitzl
21	18 March 2011	Planica	2010/11	(Austria) Gregor Schlierenzauer	(Austria) Thomas Morgenstern	(Austria) Martin Koch
22	27 November 2011	Ruka	2011/12	(Austria) Andreas Kofler	(Austria) Gregor Schlierenzauer	(Austria) Thomas Morgenstern
23	30 December 2011	Oberstdorf	2011/12	(Austria) Gregor Schlierenzauer	(Austria) Andreas Kofler	(Austria) Thomas Morgenstern
24	26 January 2014	Sapporo	2013/14	(Slovenia) Jernej Damjan	(Slovenia) Peter Prevc	(Slovenia) Robert Kranjec
25	30 January 2016	Sapporo	2015/16	(Slovenia) Peter Prevc	(Slovenia) Domen Prevc	(Slovenia) Robert Kranjec
26	18 March 2018	Vikersund	2017/18	(Norway) Robert Johansson	(Norway) Andreas Stjernen	(Norway) Daniel-André Tande
27	6 December 2020	Nizhny Tagil	2020/21	(Norway) Halvor Egner Granerud	(Norway) Robert Johansson	(Norway) Marius Lindvik
28	25 March 2022	Planica	2021/22	(Slovenia) Žiga Jelar	(Slovenia) Peter Prevc	(Slovenia) Anže Lanišek
29	13 March 2024	Trondheim	2023/24	(Austria) Stefan Kraft	(Austria) Daniel Tschofenig	(Austria) Jan Hörl
30	22 December 2024	Engelberg	2024/25	(Austria) Daniel Tschofenig	(Austria) Jan Hörl	(Austria) Stefan Kraft
31	29 December 2024	Oberstdorf	2024/25	(Austria) Stefan Kraft	(Austria) Jan Hörl	(Austria) Daniel Tschofenig
32	4 January 2025	Innsbruck	2024/25	(Austria) Stefan Kraft	(Austria) Jan Hörl	(Austria) Daniel Tschofenig
33	6 January 2025	Bischofshofen	2024/25	(Austria) Daniel Tschofenig	(Austria) Jan Hörl	(Austria) Stefan Kraft
34	22 November 2025	Lillehammer	2025/26	(Austria) Daniel Tschofenig	(Austria) Jan Hörl	(Austria) Stefan Kraft

=== Women ===
No.	Date	Place	Season	Winner	Second	Third
1	12 February 2017	Ljubno	2016/17	(Germany) Katharina Althaus	(Germany) Carina Vogt	(Germany) Svenja Würth
2	13 March 2022	Oberhof	2021/22	(Slovenia) Urša Bogataj	(Slovenia) Nika Križnar	(Slovenia) Ema Klinec
3	5 February 2023	Willingen	2022/23	(Japan) Yuki Ito	(Japan) Nozomi Maruyama	(Japan) Sara Takanashi

== Shared wins ==
=== Men ===
No.	Season	Date	Place	Hill	Size	Winners	
1	1981/82	3 January 1982	(Austria) Innsbruck	Bergiselschanze K104	LH	(East Germany) Manfred Deckert	(Norway) Per Bergerud
2	1985/86	19 January 1986	(East Germany) Oberwiesenthal	Fichtelbergschanzen K90	NH	(East Germany) Ulf Findeisen	(Austria) Ernst Vettori
3	1988/89	14 January 1989	(Czechoslovakia) Liberec	Ještěd A K120	LH	(Czechoslovakia) Pavel Ploc	(Norway) Jon Inge Kjørum
4	1989/90	11 February 1990	(Switzerland) Engelberg	Gross-Titlis-Schanze K120	LH	(Finland) Ari-Pekka Nikkola	(Socialist Federal Republic of Yugoslavia) Franci Petek
5	1990/91	1 January 1991	(Germany) Garmisch-Pa	Große Olympiaschanze K107	LH	(Germany) Jens Weißflog	(Austria) Andreas Felder
6	1995/96	21 January 1996	(Japan) Sapporo	Ōkurayama K115	LH	(Finland) Ari-Pekka Nikkola	(Austria) Andreas Goldberger
7	2004/05	29 January 2005	(Poland) Zakopane	Wielka Krokiew HS134	LH	(Poland) Adam Małysz	(Norway) Roar Ljøkelsøy
8	2010/11	12 February 2011	(Norway) Vikersund	Vikersundbakken HS225	FH	(Austria) Gregor Schlierenzauer	(Norway) Johan Remen Evensen
9	2012/13	17 March 2013	(Norway) Oslo	Holmenkollbakken HS134	LH	(Austria) Gregor Schlierenzauer	(Poland) Piotr Żyła
10	2014/15	29 November 2014	(Finland) Ruka	Rukatunturi HS142	LH	(Switzerland) Simon Ammann	(Japan) Noriaki Kasai
11	2016/17	11 February 2017	(Japan) Sapporo	Ōkurayama HS137	LH	(Poland) Maciej Kot	(Slovenia) Peter Prevc
12	2021/22	27 February 2022	(Finland) Lahti	Salpausselkä HS130	LH	(Japan) Ryōyū Kobayashi	(Norway) Halvor Egner Granerud
13	2022/23	27 November 2022	(Finland) Ruka	Rukatunturi HS142	LH	(Norway) Halvor Egner Granerud	(Austria) Stefan Kraft

=== Women ===
No.	Season	Date	Place	Hill	Size	Winners	
1	2012/13	9 December 2012	(Russia) Sochi	RusSki Gorki HS106	NH	(Austria) Daniela Iraschko-Stolz	(France) Coline Mattel
2	2014/15	15 February 2015	(Slovenia) Ljubno	Savina HS95	NH	(Austria) Daniela Iraschko-Stolz	(Japan) Sara Takanashi

== Timeline of record World Cup winners ==
Name	Start	End	Wins
(Austria) Toni Innauer	27 December 1979	30 December 1979	1
(Austria) Toni Innauer (East Germany) Jochen Danneberg	30 December 1979	1 January 1980	1
(Austria) Toni Innauer (East Germany) Jochen Danneberg (Austria) Hubert Neuper	1 January 1980	4 January 1980	1
(Austria) Hubert Neuper	4 January 1980	20 January 1980	2
(Austria) Hubert Neuper (Austria) Armin Kogler	20 January 1980	9 February 1980	2
(Austria) Hubert Neuper (Austria) Armin Kogler (Poland) Piotr Fijas	9 February 1980	2 March 1980	2
(Austria) Hubert Neuper (Austria) Armin Kogler (Poland) Piotr Fijas (Austria) Toni Innauer	2 March 1980	8 March 1980	2
(Austria) Armin Kogler	8 March 1980	1 January 1982	3–8
(Austria) Armin Kogler (Norway) Roger Ruud	1 January 1982	17 January 1982	8
(Austria) Armin Kogler	17 January 1982	27 February 1983	9–12
(Austria) Armin Kogler (Finland) Matti Nykänen	27 February 1983	6 March 1983	12
(Austria) Armin Kogler (Finland) Matti Nykänen (Canada) Horst Bulau	6 March 1983	11 March 1983	12
(Austria) Armin Kogler	11 March 1983	26 March 1983	13
(Austria) Armin Kogler (Finland) Matti Nykänen	26 March 1983	10 December 1983	13
(Austria) Armin Kogler (Finland) Matti Nykänen (Canada) Horst Bulau	10 December 1983	18 February 1984	13
(Finland) Matti Nykänen	18 February 1984	26 January 2013	14–46
(Finland) Matti Nykänen (Austria) Gregor Schlierenzauer	26 January 2013	3 February 2013	46
(Austria) Gregor Schlierenzauer	3 February 2013	streak in run	47–53

== Multiple major titles ==
=== All with at least five different major titles ===
On 6 March 2026, Domen Prevc became the only ski jumper in history to achieve all 7 prestigious individual titles.

Title	Olympic champion (NH, LH)	World champion		World Cup		4 Hills; Tournament	World record
Title	Olympic champion (NH, LH)	Nordic (NH, LH)	Ski Flying (FH)	Overall (big globe)	Ski Flying (small globe)	4 Hills; Tournament	World record
(Slovenia) Domen Prevc	1	1	1	1	2	1	1
(Finland) Matti Nykänen (Note: Matti Nykänen would be best by points in ski flying in 1983 and 1984 seasons, but at that time they didn't yet specifically count ski flights, nor did they award small crystal globes. It is the only title he is missing. In 1991 when he still competed they already awarded small globes, but he was in downfall.)	3	1	1	4	—	2	5
(Austria) Stefan Kraft	—	3	1	3	3	1	1
(Austria) Andreas Goldberger	—	—	1	3	2	2	1
(Norway) Espen Bredesen	1	1	—	1	—	1	2
(Austria) Gregor Schlierenzauer	—	1	1	2	3	2	—
(Slovenia) Peter Prevc	—	—	1	1	3	1	1

== Key people ==
Torbjørn Yggeseth was a founder of World Cup in 1979. A new function race director was established in 1988 by International Ski Federation, with its first director Niilo Halonen then called FIS coordinator for ski jumping. Before that season this function did not exist. In the premiere Women's 2011/12 World Cup season Chika Yoshida was entitled as World Cup Coordinator, but since the season 2012/13 Yoshida is called Race Director.

=== Men ===
No.		Function	Mandate	Seasons
1	(Finland) Niilo Halonen	race director (RD)	1988–1992	–
2	(Austria) Walter Hofer	race director (RD)	1992–2020	28
3	(Italy) Sandro Pertile	race director (RD)	2020–present	6

Race director assistants

- (Slovenia) Miran Tepeš (1999–2016)
- (Czech Republic) Borek Sedlák (2016–present)

Equipment control

- (Austria) Sepp Gratzer (1992–2021)
- (Finland) Mika Jukkara (2021–2022)
- (Austria) Christian Kathol (2022–2025)
- (Austria) Mathias Hafele (2025–present)

=== Women ===
No.		Function	Mandate	Seasons
1	(Japan) Chika Yoshida	race director (RD)	2011–present	15

Race director assistants

- (Poland) Aga Baczkowska (2012–2014)
- (Czech Republic) Borek Sedlák (2014–2016)
- (Slovenia) Miran Tepeš (2016–present)

Equipment control

- (Poland) Aga Baczkowska (2014–present)

== See also ==
- FIS Ski Flying World Cup
- FIS Nordic World Ski Championships
- FIS Ski Flying World Championships
- Four Hills Tournament
- Ski jumping at the Winter Olympics
- List of FIS Nordic World Ski Championships medalists in ski jumping
- List of Olympic medalists in ski jumping
- List of FIS Ski Jumping World Cup team events
