= Große Zirmbergschanze =

Ski jumping venue in Ruhpolding, Germany

Coordinates: 47.7133°N 12.6443°E

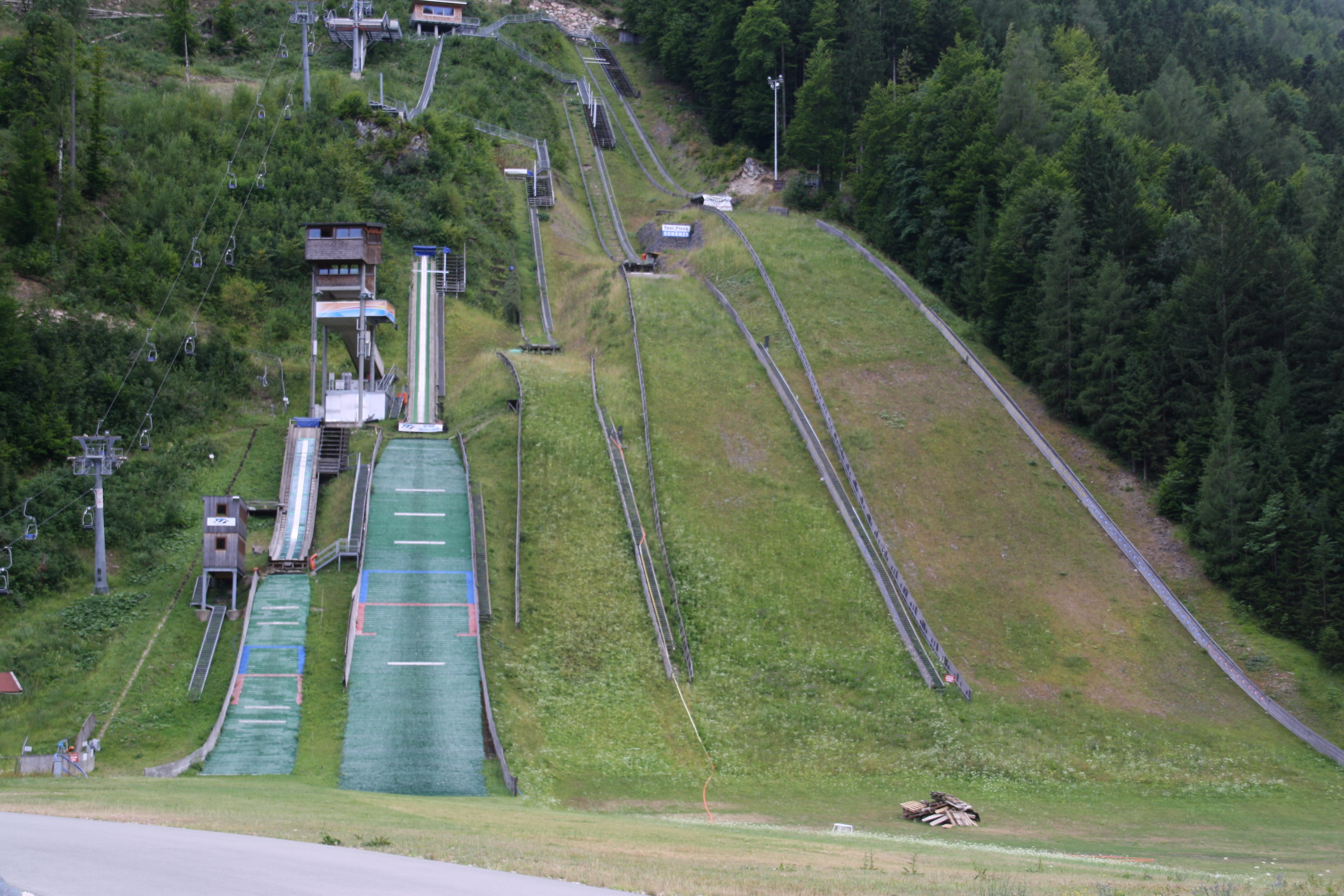
- Location: Ruhpolding; Germany
- Opened: 1961/62

Size
- K–point: K-115
- Hill size: HS 128
- Hill record: 133 m (395 ft) (Germany) Ronny Ackermann

Große Zirmbergschanze is a ski jumping large hill in Ruhpolding, Germany.

== History ==
It was built in 1962 and owned by Ski-Club Ruhpolding. It hosted one FIS Ski jumping World Cup event in 1992. Ronny Ackermann holds the hill record.

== World Cup ==
=== Men ===
| Date | Size | Winner | Second | Third |
|---|---|---|---|---|
| 13 Dec 1992 | K-107 | (Switzerland) Stephan Zünd | (Austria) Werner Rathmayr | (France) Didier Mollard |
