= Yūji Ashimoto =

Japanese former ski jumper

Personal information
- Full name: Yūji Ashimoto
- Born: Yoichi, Hokkaido

Sport
- Sport: Skiing

World Cup career
- Seasons: 1993–1994
- Indiv. podiums: 1 (+1 Team)
- Updated on 30 Mar 2015

Yūji Ashimoto (葦本 祐二, Ashimoto Yūji) is a Japanese former ski jumper. At the height of his career, he became paralyzed in a car accident. He later participated in outrigger ski events.
