= Bjørn Myrbakken =

Norwegian ski jumper

Medal record

Men's ski jumping

World Championships
Gold medal – first place	1993 Falun	Team large hill

Bjørn Myrbakken (born August 15, 1972) is a Norwegian former ski jumper who competed from 1991 to 1995. He won a gold medal in the team large hill at the 1993 FIS Nordic World Ski Championships in Falun and finished 33rd in the individual normal hill in those same championships.

Myrbakken's best individual finish at the Winter Olympics was 39th in the individual normal hill at Lillehammer in 1994. His best individual career finish was third twice in the large hill (1992 and 1993).
