= Helge Brendryen =

Norwegian ski jumper

Medal record

Men's ski jumping

Representing Norway

World Championships
| Gold medal – first place | 1993 Falun | Team large hill |

Helge Brendryen (born April 20, 1974) is a Norwegian former ski jumper who competed from 1993 to 1995. He won a gold medal in the team large hill at the 1993 FIS Nordic World Ski Championships and finished fifth in the individual large hill at those same championships.

His best non-world championship finish was eighth in a flying hill competition in Austria in 1993.
