= Werner Haim =

Austrian ski jumper

Personal information
- Nationality: Austria
- Born: 21 February 1968 (age 58) Hall in Tirol, Austria
- Height: 1.73 m (5 ft 8 in)

Sport
- Sport: Skiing

World Cup career
- Seasons: 1984–1995
- Indiv. starts: 110
- Indiv. podiums: 6
- Indiv. wins: 1
- Team starts: 1
- Updated on 10 February 2016

Werner Haim (born 21 February 1968) is an Austrian former ski jumper.

== Career ==
In the World Cup he finished 32 times among the top 10, his best result being a victory from Liberec in January 1990. He finished ninth in the overall World Cup that season, as well as in 1993.

He participated in the Ski-Flying World Championships in 1990, 1992 and 1994, his best finish being a seventh place from 1990. He also participated in the FIS Nordic World Ski Championships 1989, placing 38th in the normal hill, 33rd in the large hill and 6th in the team event.

== World Cup ==
=== Standings ===
Season	Overall	4H	SF
1983/84	—	112	N/A
1984/85	—	49	N/A
1985/86	—	100	N/A
1986/87	—	104	N/A
1987/88	50	90	N/A
1988/89	23	12	N/A
1989/90	9	9	N/A
1990/91	13	41	5
1991/92	21	12	15
1992/93	9	8	4
1993/94	40	19	16
1994/95	46	37	—

=== Wins ===
No.	Season	Date	Location	Hill	Size
1	1989/90	14 January 1990	(Czechoslovakia) Liberec	Ještěd A K120	LH
