= Jaroslav Sakala =

Czech ski jumper

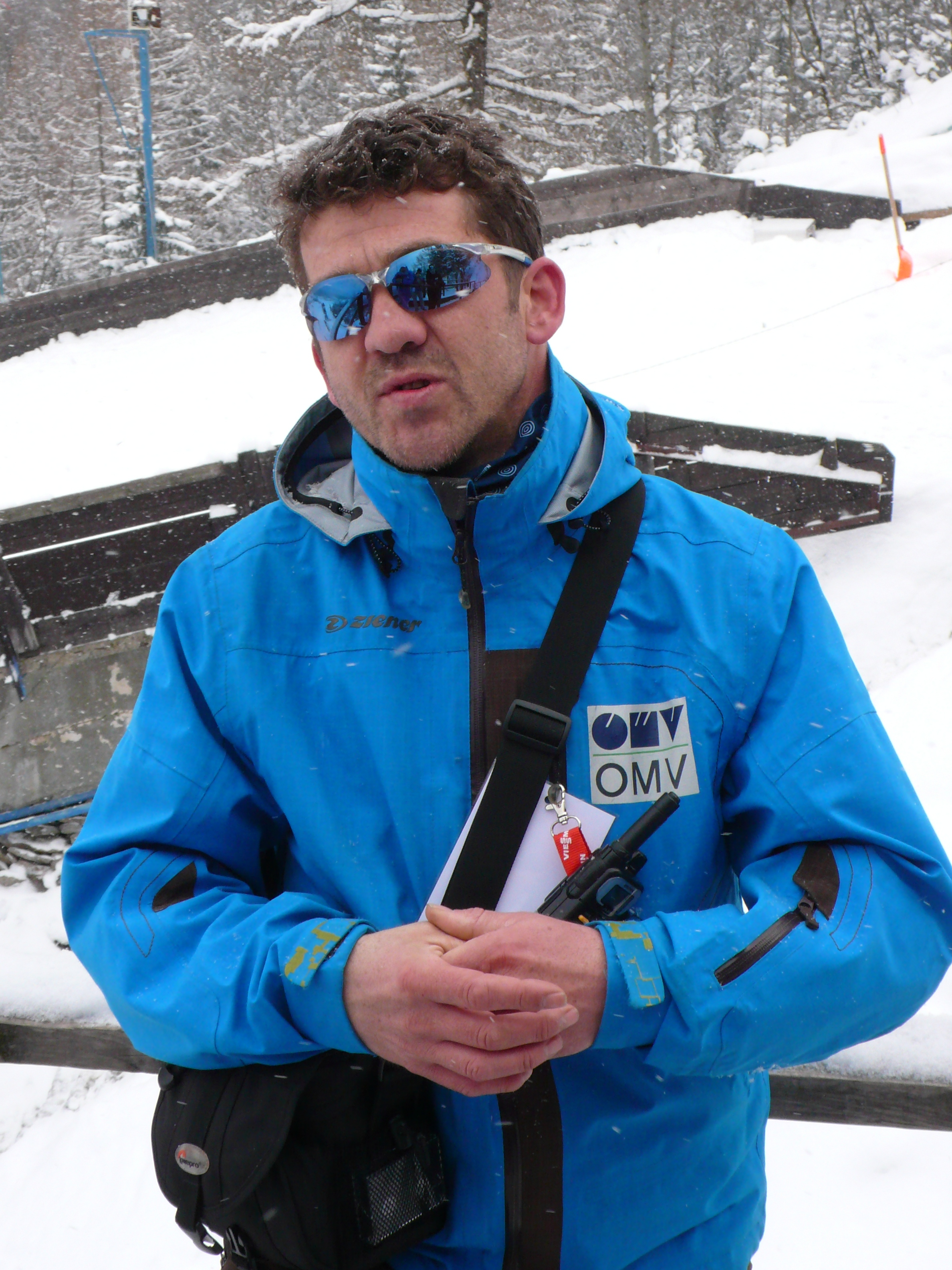

Personal information
- Nationality: Czechoslovakia (89–92); Czech Republic (93–02)
- Born: 14 July 1969 (age 57) Krnov, Czechoslovakia
- Height: 1.78 m (5 ft 10 in)

Sport
- Sport: Skiing

World Cup career
- Seasons: 1989–2002
- Indiv. starts: 182
- Indiv. podiums: 11
- Indiv. wins: 4
- Team starts: 14
- Ski Flying titles: 2 (1993, 1994)

Achievements and titles
- Personal bests: 202.5 m (664 ft); Kulm, 18-19 February 2000
Medal record
Men's ski jumping
Olympic Games
Bronze medal – third place	1992 Albertville	Team LH
FIS Nordic World Ski Championships
Silver medal – second place	1993 Falun	Individual LH
Silver medal – second place	1993 Falun	Team LH
Bronze medal – third place	1993 Falun	Individual NH
Men's ski flying
FIS Ski Flying World Championships
Gold medal – first place	1994 Planica	Individual
- Updated on 10 February 2016

Jaroslav Sakala (Czech pronunciation: [ˈjaroslaf ˈsakala]; born 14 July 1969) is a former ski jumper who competed for Czechoslovakia and the Czech Republic.

== Career ==
He entered his first World Cup competition on 15 January 1989 in Harrachov. His first big success was at the 1992 Winter Olympics in Albertville with a bronze medal in the team large hill. Sakala finished second in the 1992-93 Overall World Cup ski jumping and fourth the following season.

He won three medals at the FIS Nordic World Ski Championships 1993 in Falun with a silver in the individual normal hill and bronzes in the individual and team large hills. Sakala achieved his first World Cup victory on 30 January 1993 at Planica. His only victory on a regular ski jump was in Liberec on 16 January 1994. Sakala's fourth and final World Cup victory on 20 March 1994 at Planica when he won the Ski Flying World Championships. He was the first Czech to break the 200 metre barrier. He could not follow up on these successes in the years afterward and he did not win a medal in ski jumping after 1996, partly because of his conflicts with the Czech skiing federation and because of his short period of excessive drinking. Sakala made more frequent ski flying appearances from 1996 until his 2002 retirement.

== World Cup ==
=== Standings ===
Season	Overall	4H	SF	NT	JP
1988/89	52	—	N/A	N/A	N/A
1989/90	47	31	N/A	N/A	N/A
1990/91	37	12	21	N/A	N/A
1991/92	14	9	13	N/A	N/A
1992/93	2nd place, silver medalist(s)	3rd place, bronze medalist(s)	1st place, gold medalist(s)	N/A	N/A
1993/94	4	5	1st place, gold medalist(s)	N/A	N/A
1994/95	34	30	11	N/A	N/A
1995/96	18	36	5	N/A	22
1996/97	23	43	10	—	32
1997/98	21	12	46	—	17
1998/99	75	—	—	—	72
1999/00	67	52	—	—	6
2000/01	62	—	45	—	N/A
2001/02	10	—	N/A	—	N/A

=== Wins ===
No.	Season	Date	Location	Hill	Size
1	1992/93	30 January 1993	(Austria) Tauplitz/Bad Mitterndorf	Kulm K185	FH
2	1992/93	31 January 1993	(Austria) Tauplitz/Bad Mitterndorf	Kulm K185	FH
3	1993/94	16 January 1994	(Czech Republic) Liberec	Ještěd A K120	LH
4	1993/94	20 March 1994	(Slovenia) Planica (SF-WCS)	Velikanka bratov Gorišek K185	FH
