= Werner Rathmayr =

Austrian ski jumper

Personal information
- Nationality: Austria
- Born: 26 January 1972 (age 54) Linz, Austria
- Height: 1.70 m (5 ft 7 in)

Sport
- Sport: Skiing

World Cup career
- Seasons: 1990–1997
- Indiv. starts: 66
- Indiv. podiums: 12
- Indiv. wins: 6
- Team starts: 5
- Team podiums: 4
- Team wins: 3
- Ski Flying titles: 1 (1992)
- Updated on 10 February 2016

Werner Rathmayr (born 26 January 1972) is an Austrian former ski jumper.

== Career ==
He earned six World Cup wins between 1991 and 1992. Rathmayer's best finish at the FIS Ski Flying World Championships was 18th in Harrachov in 1992. Rathmayr did not participate in the 1992 Winter Olympic Games in Albertville, despite being the World Cup leader. He is the only athlete in the history of Ski Jumping World Cup to do so, and one of only two athletes, who were the World Cup leaders during the Olympic Games, but finished without a single medal at the event (the other one is Jakub Janda, who did that in 2006). During one of the training rounds at the 1993 World Ski Championships, Rathmayr suffered a dangerous fall after which he was never able to come back to his form from 1992 and 1993. His best start after the fall was 7th place in Innsbruck in 1994.

== World Cup ==
=== Standings ===
Season	Overall	4H	SF	NT	JP
1989/90	—	86	N/A	N/A	N/A
1990/91	—	—	—	N/A	N/A
1991/92	2nd place, silver medalist(s)	3rd place, bronze medalist(s)	1st place, gold medalist(s)	N/A	N/A
1992/93	4	11	6	N/A	N/A
1993/94	26	41	24	N/A	N/A
1994/95	59	56	44	N/A	N/A
1995/96	—	—	—	N/A	—
1996/97	93	—	49	—	—

=== Wins ===
No.	Season	Date	Location	Hill	Size
1	1991/92	14 December 1991	(Japan) Sapporo	Miyanomori K90	NH
2	1991/92	15 December 1991	(Japan) Sapporo	Ōkurayama K115	LH
3	1991/92	25 January 1992	(Germany) Oberstdorf	Heini-Klopfer-Skiflugschanze K182	FH
4	1991/92	26 January 1992	(Germany) Oberstdorf	Heini-Klopfer-Skiflugschanze K182	FH
5	1992/93	5 December 1992	(Sweden) Falun	Lugnet K115	LH
6	1992/93	6 December 1992	(Sweden) Falun	Lugnet K115	LH
