= Christof Duffner =

German ski jumper (born 1971)

Personal information
- Nationality: West Germany (1988-90); Germany (1990–2003)
- Born: 16 December 1971 (age 54) Triberg im Schwarzwald, West Germany
- Height: 184 cm (6 ft 0 in)

Sport
- Sport: Skiing

World Cup career
- Seasons: 1989–2003
- Indiv. starts: 222
- Indiv. podiums: 5
- Indiv. wins: 1
- Team starts: 16
- Team podiums: 9
- Team wins: 1

Achievements and titles
- Personal bests: 219 m (720 ft); Planica, 17–18 March 2001
Medal record
Men's ski jumping
Representing Germany
Olympic Games
Gold medal – first place	1994 Lillehammer	Team LH
FIS Nordic World Ski Championships
Gold medal – first place	1999 Ramsau	Team LH
Bronze medal – third place	1997 Trondheim	Team LH
- Updated on 10 February 2016

Christof Duffner (born 16 December 1971) is a West German/German former ski jumper.

== Career ==
He won a gold medal in the team large hill event at the 1994 Winter Olympics in Lillehammer. Duffner also won two medals in the team large hill event at the FIS Nordic World Ski Championships with gold in 1999 and silver in 1997. His only World cup victory was in 1992 in Oberstdorf.

On 22 March 1992, he crashed at world record distance at 194 metres (636 ft) at FIS Ski Flying World Championships 1992 in Harrachov, Czechoslovakia.

On 18 March 1994, he crashed at world record distance at 207 metres (679 ft) at FIS Ski Flying World Championships 1994 in Planica, Slovenia.

== World Cup ==
=== Standings ===
Season	Overall	4H	SF	NT	JP
1988/89	—	90	N/A	N/A	N/A
1989/90	—	—	N/A	N/A	N/A
1990/91	17	16	21	N/A	N/A
1991/92	19	21	8	N/A	N/A
1992/93	6	7	10	N/A	N/A
1993/94	25	28	4	N/A	N/A
1994/95	44	70	16	N/A	N/A
1995/96	14	5	3rd place, bronze medalist(s)	N/A	17
1996/97	34	26	—	21	29
1997/98	38	39	17	37	45
1998/99	21	44	5	16	23
1999/00	49	56	34	41	55
2000/01	25	33	18	25	N/A
2001/02	22	21	N/A	10	N/A
2002/03	47	45	N/A	42	N/A

=== Wins ===
No.	Season	Date	Location	Hill	Size
1	1992/93	30 December 1992	(Germany) Oberstdorf	Schattenbergschanze K115	LH

== Invalid ski jumping world records ==
Date	Hill	Location	Metres	Feet
22 March 1992	Čerťák K185	Harrachov, Czechoslovakia	194	636
18 March 1994	Velikanka bratov Gorišek K185	Planica, Slovenia	207	679

Not recognized! Crash at world record distance.
