= Didier Mollard =

French ski jumper (born 1969)

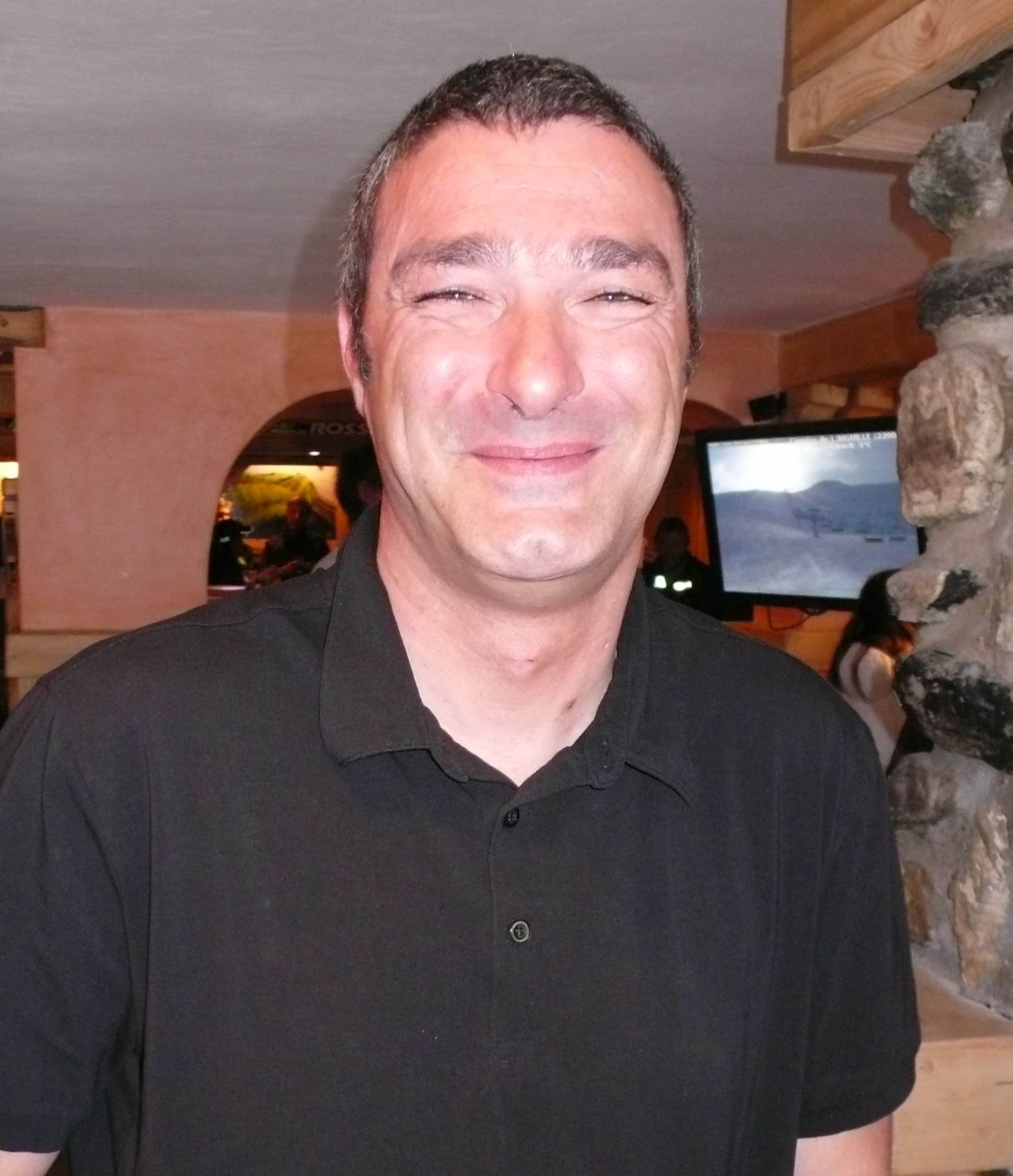
Didier Mollard in 2010

Didier Mollard (born 4 December 1969) is a French former ski jumper who competed from 1986 to 1997. At the 1992 Winter Olympics in Albertville, he finished eighth in the individual normal hill event.

Mollard's best individual finish at the FIS Nordic World Ski Championships was sixth in the large hill event at Trondheim in 1997. He finished 29th at the 1994 Ski-flying World Championships in Planica.

Mollard best World Cup career finish was second twice, both in 1993.
