= 1999–2000 FIS Ski Flying World Cup =

Ski Flying World Cup 1999/00
Winners
- Overall: (Germany) Sven Hannawald
- Nations Cup (unofficial): Germany

Competitions
- Venues: 2
- Individual: 2
- Team: 1
- Cancelled: 1

The 1999/00 FIS Ski Flying World Cup was the 10th official World Cup season in ski flying awarded with small crystal globe as the subdiscipline of FIS Ski Jumping World Cup. First ski flying team event in history was held this season in Planica.

== Map of World Cup hosts ==
(Austria) Bad Mitterndorf	(Slovenia) Planica
Kulm	Velikanka bratov Gorišek
Europe

== World records ==
List of world record distances achieved within this World Cup season.

Date	Athlete	Hill	Round	Place	Metres	Feet
16 March 2000	(Austria) Thomas Hörl	Velikanka bratov Gorišek K185	Training – R1	Planica, Slovenia	224.5	737
18 March 2000	(Austria) Andreas Goldberger	Velikanka bratov Gorišek K185	Team event – R2	Planica, Slovenia	225	738

== Calendar ==
=== Men's Individual ===
All	No.	Date	Place (Hill)	Size	Winner	Second	Third	Ski flying leader	R.
FIS Ski Flying World Championships 2000 (14 February • (Norway) Vikersund)
481	1	19 February 2000	(Austria) Bad Mitterndorf (Kulm K185)	F _{045}	(Germany) Sven Hannawald	(Austria) Andreas Widhölzl	(Norway) Tommy Ingebrigtsen	(Germany) Sven Hannawald	
		20 February 2000	(Austria) Bad Mitterndorf (Kulm K185)	F _{cnx}	cancelled due to weather conditions			—	
488	2	19 March 2000	(Slovenia) Planica (Velikanka b. Gorišek K185)	F _{046}	(Germany) Sven Hannawald	(Finland) Janne Ahonen	(Austria) Andreas Goldberger	(Germany) Sven Hannawald	
10th FIS Ski Flying Men's Overall (19 February – 19 March 2000)					(Germany) Sven Hannawald	(Finland) Janne Ahonen	(Norway) Tommy Ingebrigtsen	Ski Flying Overall	

=== Men's team ===
All	No.	Date	Place (Hill)	Size	Winner	Second	Third	R.
16	1	18 March 2000	(Slovenia) Planica (Velikanka bratov Gorišek K185)	F _{001}	Germany Sven Hannawald; Hansjörg Jäkle; Martin Schmitt; Michael Uhrmann	Finland Ville Kantee; Risto Jussilainen; Jani Soininen; Janne Ahonen	Japan Takanobu Okabe; Kazuyoshi Funaki; Hideharu Miyahira; Noriaki Kasai	

== Standings ==
=== Ski Flying ===
Rank	after 2 events	19/03/2000 Kulm	19/03/2000 Planica	Total
	(Germany) Sven Hannawald	100	100	200
2	(Finland) Janne Ahonen	40	80	120
3	(Norway) Tommy Ingebrigtsen	60	50	110
4	(Austria) Andreas Goldberger	36	60	96
5	(Austria) Andreas Widhölzl	80	—	80
6	(Austria) Reinhard Schwarzenberger	50	18	68
7	(Austria) Martin Höllwarth	32	26	58
8	(Norway) Lasse Ottesen	45	12	57
9	(Japan) Kazuyoshi Funaki	9	40	49
10	(France) Nicolas Dessum	26	20	46
	(Japan) Noriaki Kasai	1	45	46
12	(Italy) Roberto Cecon	29	15	44
	(Japan) Hideharu Miyahira	20	24	44
14	(Germany) Martin Schmitt	13	29	42
15	(Japan) Masahiko Harada	22	14	36
	(Finland) Ville Kantee	4	32	36
	(Poland) Adam Małysz	—	36	36
18	(Austria) Stefan Horngacher	24	11	35
19	(Japan) Hiroya Saitō	16	16	32
20	(Austria) Wolfgang Loitzl	18	10	28
	(Finland) Jani Soininen	6	22	28
22	(Norway) Henning Stensrud	14	7	21
23	(Norway) Roar Ljøkelsøy	3	13	16
24	(Germany) Frank Löffler	15	—	15
25	(Finland) Tami Kiuru	12	—	12
	(Germany) Hansjörg Jäkle	8	4	12
27	(Finland) Matti Hautamäki	11	—	11
28	(Finland) Risto Jussilainen	10	—	10
29	(Austria) Thomas Hörl	—	9	9
30	(Norway) David Andersen	—	8	8
31	(Japan) Takanobu Okabe	7	—	7
32	(Norway) Olav Magne Dønnem	6	—	6
	(Japan) Kazuki Nishishita	—	6	6
34	(Poland) Wojciech Skupień	2	3	5
	(Germany) Christof Duffner	—	5	5
36	(Japan) Kazuhiro Nakamura	—	2	2
37	(Slovenia) Damjan Fras	—	1	1

=== Nations Cup (unofficial) ===
Rank	after 3 events	Points
1	Germany	674
2	Austria	574
3	Finland	567
4	Japan	522
5	Norway	468
6	Poland	155
7	Slovenia	101
8	Czech Republic	50
9	France	46
10	Italy	44
