= 1998–99 FIS Ski Flying World Cup =

Ski Flying World Cup 1998/99
Winners
- Overall: (Germany) Martin Schmitt
- Nations Cup (unofficial): Japan

Competitions
- Venues: 1
- Individual: 3
- Cancelled: 2

The 1998/99 FIS Ski Flying World Cup was the 9th official World Cup season in ski flying awarded with small crystal globe as the subdiscipline of FIS Ski Jumping World Cup.

== Map of World Cup hosts ==
(Czech Republic) ~~Harrachov~~	(Slovenia) Planica
~~Čerťák~~	Velikanka bratov Gorišek
Europe

== World records ==
List of world record distances (both official and invalid) achieved within this World Cup season.

Date	Athlete	Hill	Round	Place	Metres	Feet
19 March 1999	(Germany) Martin Schmitt	Velikanka bratov Gorišek K185	Round 1	Planica, Slovenia	219	719
19 March 1999	(Germany) Martin Schmitt	Velikanka bratov Gorišek K185	Final	Planica, Slovenia	214.5	704
20 March 1999	(Norway) Tommy Ingebrigtsen	Velikanka bratov Gorišek K185	Trial	Planica, Slovenia	219.5	720

Longest jump in history at that time, but invalid due to Schmitt crashed upon landing.

== Calendar ==
=== Men's Individual ===
All	No.	Date	Place (Hill)	Size	Winner	Second	Third	Ski flying leader	R.
		6 February 1999	(Czech Republic) Harrachov (Čerťák K185)	F _{cnx}	Thursday/Fridary storm demolished wind curtain protection construction (that's why competition was rescheduled to Planica on 19 March)			—	
		7 February 1999	(Czech Republic) Harrachov (Čerťák K185)	F _{cnx}	Thursday/Fridary storm demolished wind curtain protection construction (that's why competition was moved to large hill in Harrachov)			—	
460	1	(Note: Cancelled ski flying event from Harrachov (6 February) was rescheduled to Planica on Friday (19 March).)19 March 1999	(Slovenia) Planica (Velikanka b. Gorišek K185)	F _{042}	(Germany) Martin Schmitt	(Japan) Kazuyoshi Funaki	(Germany) Christof Duffner	(Germany) Martin Schmitt	
461	2	20 March 1999	(Slovenia) Planica (Velikanka b. Gorišek K185)	F _{043}	(Japan) Hideharu Miyahira	(Germany) Martin Schmitt	(Japan) Noriaki Kasai	(Germany) Martin Schmitt	
462	3	21 March 1999	(Slovenia) Planica (Velikanka b. Gorišek K185)	F _{044}	(Japan) Noriaki Kasai	(Japan) Hideharu Miyahira	(Germany) Martin Schmitt	(Germany) Martin Schmitt	
9th FIS Ski Flying Men's Overall (6 February – 21 March 1999)					(Germany) Martin Schmitt	(Japan) Noriaki Kasai	(Japan) Hideharu Miyahira	Ski Flying Overall	

== Standings ==
=== Ski Flying ===
Rank	after 3 events	19/03/1999 Planica	20/03/1999 Planica	21/03/1999 Planica	Total
	(Germany) Martin Schmitt	100	80	60	240
2	(Japan) Noriaki Kasai	50	60	100	210
3	(Japan) Hideharu Miyahira	—	100	80	180
4	(Japan) Kazuyoshi Funaki	80	36	50	166
5	(Germany) Christof Duffner	60	40	16	116
6	(Finland) Janne Ahonen	45	32	29	106
7	(Norway) Kristian Brenden	29	50	20	99
8	(Japan) Masahiko Harada	12	45	36	93
9	(Germany) Sven Hannawald	26	24	40	90
10	(Norway) Olav Magne Dønnem	40	—	32	72
11	(France) Nicolas Dessum	24	22	13	59
	(Japan) Kazuya Yoshioka	14	—	45	59
13	(Austria) Reinhard Schwarzenberger	22	29	6	57
14	(Austria) Wolfgang Loitzl	13	15	22	50
	(Japan) Kazuhiro Nakamura	10	14	26	50
	(Austria) Stefan Horngacher	8	18	24	50
17	(Germany) Roland Audenrieth	16	11	14	41
18	(Norway) Tommy Ingebrigtsen	36	2	—	38
19	(Germany) Hansjörg Jäkle	11	26	—	37
20	(Slovenia) Primož Peterka	2	16	18	36
21	(Austria) Andreas Widhölzl	32	—	—	32
22	(Switzerland) Bruno Reuteler	—	20	8	28
23	(Norway) Henning Stensrud	—	9	15	24
24	(Slovenia) Miha Rihtar	5	5	12	22
25	(Finland) Ville Kantee	7	14	—	21
	(Finland) Risto Jussilainen	6	8	7	21
27	(Austria) Martin Höllwarth	20	—	—	20
28	(Germany) Dieter Thoma	18	—	—	18
29	(Slovenia) Urban Franc	—	12	4	16
30	(Czech Republic) Jakub Sucháček	15	—	—	15
31	(Switzerland) Sylvain Freiholz	—	—	11	11
32	(Italy) Ivan Lunardi	—	10	—	10
	(Finland) Mika Laitinen	—	—	10	10
34	(Austria) Andreas Goldberger	9	—	—	9
	(Austria) Wilfried Eberharter	—	7	2	9
	(Slovakia) Matej Uram	—	—	9	9
37	(Finland) Jani Soininen	—	6	—	6
38	(Poland) Robert Mateja	4	1	—	5
	(Norway) Jon Petter Sandaker	—	—	5	5
40	(United States) Alan Alborn	—	4	—	4
	(Poland) Adam Małysz	—	3	1	4
42	(Norway) Lasse Ottesen	3	—	—	3
	(Japan) Masayuki Satō	—	—	3	3
44	(Norway) Roar Ljøkelsøy	1	—	—	1

=== Nations Cup (unofficial) ===
Rank	after 3 events	Points
1	Japan	761
2	Germany	542
3	Norway	237
4	Austria	227
5	Finland	164
6	Slovenia	74
7	France	59
8	Switzerland	39
9	Czech Republic	15
10	Italy	10
11	Slovakia	9
	Poland	9
13	United States	4
