= 1999–2000 FIS Ski Jumping Continental Cup =

Ski-jumping competition series

FIS Continental Cup 1999/00
Winners
- Overall: (Germany) Dirk Else

Competitions
- Venues: 32
- Individual: 51
- Cancelled: 2

The 1999/00 FIS Ski Jumping Continental Cup was the 9th in a row (7th official) Continental Cup winter season in ski jumping for men. Europa Cup was a predecessor of Continental Cup.

Other competitive circuits this season included the World Cup and Grand Prix.

== Men's Individual ==
Individual events in the CC history

Total	F	L	N	Winners
353	2	129	222	161

after large hill event in Kuusamo (26 March 2000)

=== Calendar ===
All	No.	Date	Place (Hill)	Size	Winner	Second	Third	R.
303	1	25 June 1999	(Slovenia) Velenje (Grajski grič K75) (Note: Not clear if Grajski grič hill in Velenje had K-point at K75 or K85 at that time.)	N _{193}				
304	2	26 June 1999	(Slovenia) Velenje (Grajski grič K75)	N _{194}	(Slovenia) Primož Peterka			
305	3	17 July 1999	(Austria) Villach (Villacher Alpenarena K90)	N _{195}	(Austria) Martin Koch	(Slovenia) Damjan Fras	(Germany) Michael Uhrmann	
306	4	18 July 1999	(Austria) Villach (Villacher Alpenarena K90)	N _{196}	(Germany) Dennis Störl (Austria) Bernhard Metzler		(Germany) Michael Uhrmann	
307	5	31 July 1999	(Germany) Oberstdorf (Schattenbergschanze K90)	N _{197}	(Switzerland) Bruno Reuteler	(Germany) Roland Audenrieth	(Switzerland) Simon Ammann	
308	6	14 August 1999	(Poland) Zakopane (Średnia Krokiew K85)	N _{198}	(Germany) Frank Löffler	(Poland) Wojciech Skupień	(Slovenia) Primož Urh-Zupan (Poland) Łukasz Kruczek	
309	7	15 August 1999	(Poland) Zakopane (Średnia Krokiew K85)	N _{199}	(Germany) Dirk Else	(Poland) Adam Małysz	(Slovenia) Bine Norčič	
310	8	19 August 1999	(Norway) Rælingen (Marikollen K88)	N _{200}	(Germany) Georg Späth	(Norway) Bjarte Engen Vik	(Germany) Frank Löffler	
311	9	23 October 1999	(Japan) Hakuba (Olympic Hills K120)	L _{109}	(Japan) Kazuyoshi Funaki	(Japan) Hideharu Miyahira (Japan) Masahiko Harada		
312	10	24 October 1999	(Japan) Hakuba (Olympic Hills K120)	L _{110}	(Japan) Kazuyoshi Funaki	(Japan) Hideharu Miyahira	(Germany) Dennis Störl	
313	11	11 December 1999	(Norway) Trondheim (Granåsen K120)	L _{111}	(Finland) Juha-Matti Ruuskanen	(Norway) Jostein Smeby	(Austria) Thomas Hörl	
314	12	12 December 1999	(Norway) Trondheim (Granåsen K120)	L _{112}	(Austria) Thomas Hörl	(Norway) Jon Petter Sandaker	(Norway) Espen Bredesen	
315	13	16 December 1999	(Finland) Kuopio (Puijo K120)	L _{113}	(Japan) Kazuki Nishishita	(Finland) Matti Hautamäki	(Norway) Wilhelm Brenna	
316	14	18 December 1999	(Finland) Lahti (Salpausselkä K116)	L _{114}	(Austria) Thomas Hörl	(Japan) Kazuki Nishishita	(Finland) Lauri Hakola	
317	15	19 December 1999	(Finland) Lahti (Salpausselkä K116)	L _{115}	(Japan) Kazuki Nishishita	(Finland) Kimmo Yliriesto	(Slovenia) Grega Lang	
		26 December 1999	(Switzerland) St. Moritz (Olympiaschanze K95)	N _{cnx}	cancelled			
318	16	1 January 2000	(Austria) Innsbruck (Bergiselschanze K110)	L _{116}	(Austria) R. Schwarzenberger	(Austria) Christian Nagiller	(Austria) Stefan Kaiser	
319	17	6 January 2000	(Switzerland) Engelberg (Gross-Titlis-Schanze K120)	L _{117}	(Austria) Martin Höllwarth	(Switzerland) Bruno Reuteler	(Germany) Dirk Else	
320	18	8 January 2000	(Italy) Gallio (Trampolino di Pakstall K92)	N _{201}	(Finland) Tami Kiuru	(Germany) Dirk Else	(Germany) Georg Späth	
321	19	9 January 2000	(Italy) Gallio (Trampolino di Pakstall K92)	N _{202}	(Germany) Georg Späth	(Finland) Tami Kiuru	(Germany) Ronny Hornschuh	
322	20	14 January 2000	(Japan) Sapporo (Miyanomori K90) (Ōkurayama K120)	N _{203}	(Japan) Noriaki Kasai	(Japan) Masahiko Harada	(Japan) Hideharu Miyahira	
323	21	15 January 2000	(Japan) Sapporo (Miyanomori K90) (Ōkurayama K120)	L _{118}	(Japan) Kazuyoshi Funaki	(Japan) Masahiko Harada	(Japan) Takanobu Okabe	
324	22	15 January 2000	(Germany) Brotterode (Inselbergschanze K98)	N _{204}	(Germany) Georg Späth	(Germany) Roland Audenrieth	(Norway) Morten Solem	
325	23	16 January 2000	(Japan) Sapporo (Ōkurayama K120)	L _{119}	(Japan) Kazuyoshi Funaki	(Japan) Noriaki Kasai	(Japan) Masahiko Harada	
326	24	16 January 2000	(Germany) Lauscha (Marktiegelschanze K92)	N _{205}	(Germany) Dirk Else	(United States) Alan Alborn	(Slovenia) Robert Meglič	
327	25	22 January 2000	(Germany) Braunlage (Wurmbergschanze K80)	N _{206}	(Norway) Arne Sneli	(Germany) Roland Audenrieth	(Austria) Karl-Heinz Dorner	
328	26	23 January 2000	(Germany) Braunlage (Wurmbergschanze K80)	N _{207}	(Finland) Toni Nieminen	(Germany) Dirk Else	(Germany) Roland Audenrieth	
329	27	29 January 2000	(Japan) Hakuba (Olympic Hills K120)	L _{120}	(Austria) Thomas Hörl	(Japan) Takashi Mori	(Japan) Hiroya Saitō	
330	28	29 January 2000	(France) Courchevel (Tremplin du Praz K90)	N _{208}	(Finland) Janne Ylijärvi	(France) Nicolas Dessum	(Germany) Christof Duffner	
331	29	30 January 2000	(Japan) Hakuba (Olympic Hills K120)	L _{121}	(Japan) Hiroya Saitō	(Austria) R. Schwarzenberger	(Japan) Kazuya Yoshioka	
332	30	30 January 2000	(France) Courchevel (Tremplin du Praz K90)	N _{209}	(France) Nicolas Dessum	(Germany) Dirk Else	(Germany) Christof Duffner	
333	31	5 February 2000	(Germany) Berchtesgaden (Kälbersteinschanze K90)	N _{210}	(Germany) Dennis Störl	(Austria) Martin Koch	(Germany) Georg Späth	
334	32	6 February 2000	(Austria) Saalfelden (Bibergschanze K85)	N _{211}	(Germany) Georg Späth	(Austria) Martin Koch	(Austria) Manuel Fettner	
335	33	8 February 2000	(Slovenia) Mislinja (Skakalnica Dr. Stanko Stoporko K85)	N _{212}	(Finland) Tami Kiuru	(Finland) Janne Ylijärvi (Norway) Morten Solem		
336	34	12 February 2000	(Slovenia) Planica (Bloudkova velikanka K120)	L _{122}	(Austria) R. Schwarzenberger	(Finland) Tami Kiuru	(Austria) Stefan Kaiser	
337	35	12 February 2000	(United States) Westby (Snowflake K106) (Note: Not clear if Snowflake hill in Westby had K-point at K106 or K113 at that time.)	L _{123}	(Japan) Yasuhiro Shibata	(Germany) Dirk Else	(Japan) Homare Kishimoto	
338	36	13 February 2000	(Slovenia) Planica (Bloudkova velikanka K120)	L _{124}	(Austria) R. Schwarzenberger	(Finland) Tami Kiuru	(Japan) Kazuki Nishishita	
339	37	13 February 2000	(United States) Westby (Snowflake K106)	L _{125}	(Japan) Homare Kishimoto	(Germany) Georg Späth	(Austria) Fabian Ebenhoch	
340	38	19 February 2000	(United States) Ishpeming (Suicide Hill K90)	N _{213}	(Germany) Dirk Else	(Germany) Dennis Störl	(Slovenia) Rolando Kaligaro	
341	39	20 February 2000	(United States) Ishpeming (Suicide Hill K90)	N _{214}	(Japan) Homare Kishimoto	(Germany) Dennis Störl	(Finland) Marko Malkamaki	
342	40	26 February 2000	(Germany) Schönwald (Adlerschanzen Schönwald K85) (Note: Not clear if Adlerschanzen Schönwald hill in Schönwald had K-point at K84 or K85 at that time.)	N _{215}	(Finland) Akseli Lajunen	(Czech Republic) Jakub Sucháček	(Austria) Wolfgang Loitzl	
343	41	27 February 2000	(Germany) Titisee-Neustadt (Hochfirstschanze K113)	L _{126}	(Austria) Wolfgang Loitzl	(Slovenia) Bine Norčič	(Finland) Kimmo Yliriesto	
28th Schwarzwald Tournament Overall (26 – 27 February 2000)					(Austria) Wolfgang Loitzl	(Finland) Kimmo Yliriesto	(Germany) Dirk Else	
344	42	3 March 2000	(Austria) Eisenerz (Erzbergschanzen K90)	N _{216}	(Austria) Thomas Hörl	(Germany) Ronny Hornschuh	(Germany) Dirk Else	
345	43	4 March 2000	(Austria) Eisenerz (Erzbergschanzen K90)	N _{217}	(Austria) Thomas Hörl	(Austria) Martin Koch	(Germany) Ronny Hornschuh	
346	44	8 March 2000	(Japan) Zaō (Yamagata K90)	N _{218}	(Austria) Stefan Thurnbichler	(Japan) Kazuya Yoshioka	(Austria) Manuel Fettner	
347	45	9 March 2000	(Japan) Zaō (Yamagata K90)	N _{219}	(Japan) Jin'ya Nishikata	(Japan) Yukitaka Fukita	(Japan) Ryōhei Nishimori	
348	46	10 March 2000	(Norway) Våler (Gjerdrumsbakken K90)	N _{220}	(Norway) Bjørn Einar Romøren (Germany) Roland Audenrieth		(Germany) Georg Späth	
349	47	11 March 2000	(Norway) Våler (Gjerdrumsbakken K90)	N _{221}	(Germany) Georg Späth	(Finland) Veli-Matti Lindström	(Norway) Lars Bystøl (Germany) Roland Audenrieth	
350	48	11 March 2000	(Czech Republic) Harrachov (Čerťák K120)	L _{127}	(Czech Republic) Jaroslav Sakala	(Austria) Martin Koch	(Austria) Thomas Hörl	
351	49	12 March	(Czech Republic) Harrachov (Čerťák K120)	L _{128}	(Germany) Dirk Else	(Austria) Martin Koch	(Czech Republic) Jaroslav Sakala	
352	50	24 March 2000	(Finland) Rovaniemi (Ounasvaara K90)	N _{222}	(Finland) Janne Ylijärvi	(Finland) Juha-Matti Ruuskanen	(Finland) Kimmo Yliriesto	
		25 March 2000	(Finland) Kuusamo (Rukatunturi K120)	L _{cnx}	cancelled			
353	51	26 March 2000	(Finland) Kuusamo (Rukatunturi K120)	L _{129}	(Norway) Olav Magne Dønnem	(Finland) Juha-Matti Ruuskanen	(Austria) Martin Koch	
9th FIS Continental Cup Overall (26 June 1999 – 26 March 2000)					(Germany) Dirk Else	(Germany) Georg Späth	(Germany) Dennis Störl	

== Standings ==
=== Overall ===
Rank	after 51 events	Points
1	(Germany) Dirk Else	1536
2	(Germany) Georg Späth	1312
3	(Germany) Dennis Störl	1169
4	(Austria) Thomas Hörl	963
5	(Germany) Roland Audenrieth	840
6	(Austria) Martin Koch	768
7	(Japan) Kazuki Nishishita	618
8	(Finland) Tami Kiuru	617
9	(Slovenia) Rolando Kaligaro	533
10	(Germany) Ronny Hornschuh	529

== Europa Cup vs. Continental Cup ==
- Last two Europa Cup seasons (1991/92 and 1992/93) are recognized as first two Continental Cup seasons by International Ski Federation (FIS), although Continental Cup under this name officially started first season in 1993/94 season.

== See also ==
- 1999–00 FIS World Cup
- 1999 FIS Grand Prix
