= 1999 FIS Ski Jumping Grand Prix =

International ski jumping competition

Grand Prix 1999
Winners
- Overall: (Germany) Sven Hannawald
- Nations Cup: Japan

Competitions
- Venues: 5
- Individual: 5
- Team: 2

The 1999 FIS Ski Jumping Grand Prix was the 6th Summer Grand Prix season in ski jumping on plastic. Season began on 6 August 1999 in Hinterzarten, Germany and ended on 15 September 1999 in Sapporo.

Other competitive circuits this season included the World Cup and Continental Cup.

== Calendar ==
=== Men ===
Num	Season	Date	Place	Hill	Size	Winner	Second	Third	Yellow bib
24	1	7 August 1999	(Germany) Hinterzarten	Rothaus-Schanze K95	NH	(Germany) Sven Hannawald	(Finland) Janne Ahonen	(Austria) Andreas Goldberger	(Germany) Sven Hannawald
25	2	14 August 1999	(France) Courchevel	Tremplin du Praz K120	LH	(Austria) Andreas Widhölzl	(Japan) Masahiko Harada	(Austria) Andreas Goldberger	(Germany) Sven Hannawald
26	3	22 August 1999	(Austria) Stams	Brunnentalschanze K105	NH	(Germany) Martin Schmitt	(Japan) Masahiko Harada	(Austria) Andreas Goldberger	(Germany) Sven Hannawald
27	4	11 September 1999	(Japan) Hakuba	Olympic Ski Jumps K120	LH	(Germany) Sven Hannawald	(Finland) Janne Ahonen	(Japan) Kazuyoshi Funaki	(Germany) Sven Hannawald
28	5	15 September 1999	(Japan) Sapporo	Okurayama K120	LH	(Austria) Andreas Widhölzl	(Austria) Andreas Goldberger	(Japan) Masahiko Harada	(Germany) Sven Hannawald

=== Men's team ===
Num	Season	Date	Place	Hill	Size	Winner	Second	Third	Yellow bib
2	1	6 August 1999	(Germany) Hinterzarten	Rothaus-Schanze K95	NH	Germany Sven Hannawald; Martin Schmitt; Christof Duffner; Hansjörg Jäkle	Japan Kazuyoshi Funaki; Masahiko Harada; Noriaki Kasai; Jinya Nishikata	Austria Andreas Widhölzl; Wolfgang Loitzl; Andreas Goldberger; Stefan Horngacher	Germany
3	2	12 September 1999	(Japan) Hakuba	Olympic Ski Jumps K120	LH	Japan Masahiko Harada; Kazuyoshi Funaki; Hideharu Miyahira; Yuta Watase	Austria Wolfgang Loitzl; Andreas Widhölzl; Andreas Goldberger; Martin Höllwarth	Germany Sven Hannawald; Martin Schmitt; Michael Uhrmann; Christof Duffner	Japan

== Standings ==
=== Overall ===
Rank	after 5 events	Points
1	(Germany) Sven Hannawald	332
2	(Austria) Andreas Goldberger	300
3	(Finland) Janne Ahonen	291
4	(Japan) Masahiko Harada	288
5	(Austria) Andreas Widhölzl	271

=== Nations Cup ===
Rank	after 7 events	Points
1	Japan	1231
2	Austria	1107
3	Germany	1092
4	Finland	691
5	Switzerland	365
