= 1999–2000 FIS Ski Jumping World Cup =

Ski jumping championship season

1999–2000 World Cup
Winners
- Overall: (Germany) Martin Schmitt
- Ski Jumping (NH, LH): (Germany) Martin Schmitt
- Ski Flying: (Germany) Sven Hannawald
- Four Hills Tournament: (Austria) Andreas Widhölzl
- Nordic Tournament: (Germany) Sven Hannawald
- Nations Cup: Finland

Competitions
- Venues: 18
- Individual: 26
- Team: 3
- Cancelled: 1

The 1999–2000 FIS Ski Jumping World Cup was the 21st World Cup season in ski jumping and the 10th official World Cup season in ski flying with tenth small crystal globe awarded.

The season began in Kuopio, Finland on 27 November 1999 and finished in Planica, Slovenia on the 19 March 2000. The individual World Cup overall winner was Martin Schmitt; small crystal globe in ski flying and Nordic Tournament both went to Sven Hannawald and Four Hills Tournament winner was Andreas Widhölzl. Nations Cup was taken by Team of Finland.

26 men's individual events at 18 different venues in 11 countries were held on three continents (Europe, Asia and North America). This season only one event (in ski flying) was cancelled in Bad Mitterndorf due to bad weather conditions (wind). There were also three men's team events held, first time in history team event in ski flying.

After four years break, the competition returned to North America to Iron Mountain, Michigan.

Peaks of the season were FIS Ski Flying World Championships (which didn't count for World Cup anymore), Four Hills Tournament and Nordic Tournament.

== World records ==
List of world record distances achieved during this World Cup season.

| Date | Athlete | Hill | Round | Place | Metres | Feet |
|---|---|---|---|---|---|---|
| 16 March 2000 | (Austria) Thomas Hörl | Velikanka bratov Gorišek K185 | Training – R1 | Planica, Slovenia | 224.5 | 737 |
| 18 March 2000 | (Austria) Andreas Goldberger | Velikanka bratov Gorišek K185 | Team event – R2 | Planica, Slovenia | 225 | 738 |

== Map of world cup hosts ==
Europe
| Germany | Austria United States | Asia |

== Calendar ==
=== Men's Individual ===
N – normal hill / L – large hill / F – flying hill
| All | No. | Date | Place (Hill) | Size | Winner | Second | Third | Overall leader | R. |
|---|---|---|---|---|---|---|---|---|---|
| 463 | 1 | 27 November 1999 | (Finland) Kuopio (Puijo K120) | L _{282} | (Germany) Martin Schmitt | (Austria) Andreas Goldberger | (Finland) Matti Hautamäki | (Germany) Martin Schmitt | |
| 464 | 2 | 28 November 1999 | (Finland) Kuopio (Puijo K120) | L _{283} | (Finland) Ville Kantee | (Finland) Risto Jussilainen | (Italy) Roberto Cecon | (Germany) Martin Schmitt | |
| 465 | 3 | 4 December 1999 | (Italy) Predazzo (Trampolino dal Ben K120) | L _{284} | (Austria) Andreas Widhölzl | (Germany) Martin Schmitt | (Austria) Andreas Goldberger | (Germany) Martin Schmitt | |
| 466 | 4 | 5 December 1999 | (Italy) Predazzo (Trampolino dal Ben K120) | L _{285} | (Austria) Andreas Widhölzl | (Finland) Jani Soininen | (Finland) Risto Jussilainen | (Germany) Martin Schmitt | |
| 467 | 5 | 12 December 1999 | (Austria) Villach (Villacher Alpenarena K90) | N _{138} | (Finland) Janne Ahonen | (Germany) Martin Schmitt | (Austria) Andreas Widhölzl | (Germany) Martin Schmitt | |
| 468 | 6 | 18 December 1999 | (Poland) Zakopane (Wielka Krokiew K116) | L _{286} | (Germany) Martin Schmitt | (Finland) Janne Ahonen | (Norway) Lasse Ottesen | (Germany) Martin Schmitt | |
| 469 | 7 | 19 December 1999 | (Poland) Zakopane (Wielka Krokiew K116) | L _{287} | (Germany) Martin Schmitt | (Finland) Janne Ahonen | (Austria) Andreas Widhölzl | (Germany) Martin Schmitt | |
| 470 | 8 | 29 December 1999 | (Germany) Oberstdorf (Schattenbergschanze K115) | L _{288} | (Germany) Martin Schmitt | (Austria) Andreas Goldberger | (Austria) Andreas Widhölzl | (Germany) Martin Schmitt | |
| 471 | 9 | 1 January 2000 | (Germany) Garmisch-Pa (Große Olympiaschanze K115) | L _{289} | (Austria) Andreas Widhölzl | (Japan) Masahiko Harada | (Finland) Janne Ahonen | (Germany) Martin Schmitt | |
| 472 | 10 | 3 January 2000 | (Austria) Innsbruck (Bergiselschanze K110) | L _{290} | (Austria) Andreas Widhölzl | (Germany) Martin Schmitt | (Finland) Janne Ahonen | (Germany) Martin Schmitt | |
| 473 | 11 | 6 January 2000 | (Austria) Bischofshofen (Paul-Ausserleitner K120) | L _{291} | (Austria) Andreas Widhölzl | (Finland) Janne Ahonen | (Germany) Martin Schmitt | (Germany) Martin Schmitt | |
| 48th Four Hills Tournament Overall (30 December 1998 – 6 January 1999) | | | | | (Austria) Andreas Widhölzl | (Finland) Janne Ahonen | (Germany) Martin Schmitt | 4H Tournament | |
| 474 | 12 | 8 January 2000 | (Switzerland) Engelberg (Gross-Titlis-Schanze K120) | L _{292} | (Germany) Martin Schmitt | (Finland) Janne Ahonen | (Austria) Andreas Widhölzl | (Germany) Martin Schmitt | |
| 475 | 13 | 9 January 2000 | (Switzerland) Engelberg (Gross-Titlis-Schanze K120) | L _{293} | (Germany) Martin Schmitt | (Germany) Sven Hannawald | (Finland) Janne Ahonen | (Germany) Martin Schmitt | |
| 476 | 14 | 22 January 2000 | (Japan) Sapporo (Ōkurayama K120) | L _{294} | (Germany) Martin Schmitt | (Finland) Janne Ahonen | (Finland) Risto Jussilainen | (Germany) Martin Schmitt | |
| 477 | 15 | 23 January 2000 | (Japan) Sapporo (Ōkurayama K120) | L _{295} | (Germany) Martin Schmitt | (Finland) Jani Soininen | (Japan) Hiroya Saito | (Germany) Martin Schmitt | |
| 478 | 16 | 26 January 2000 | (Japan) Hakuba (Olympic Hills K120) | L _{296} | (Finland) Jani Soininen | (Austria) Andreas Widhölzl | (Finland) Ville Kantee | (Germany) Martin Schmitt | |
| 479 | 17 | 5 February 2000 | (Germany) Willingen (Mühlenkopfschanze K120) | L _{297} | (Austria) Andreas Widhölzl | (Finland) Janne Ahonen | (Germany) Martin Schmitt | (Germany) Martin Schmitt | |
| 480 | 18 | 6 February 2000 | (Germany) Willingen (Mühlenkopfschanze K120) | L _{298} | (Austria) Andreas Widhölzl | (Germany) Martin Schmitt | (Finland) Janne Ahonen | (Germany) Martin Schmitt | |
FIS Ski Flying World Championships 2000 (14 February • (Norway) Vikersund)
| 481 | 19 | 19 February 2000 | (Austria) Bad Mitterndorf (Kulm K185) | F _{045} | (Germany) Sven Hannawald | (Austria) Andreas Widhölzl | (Norway) Tommy Ingebrigtsen | (Germany) Martin Schmitt | |
| | | 20 February 2000 | (Austria) Bad Mitterndorf (Kulm K185) | F _{cnx} | cancelled due to weather conditions | | | — | |
| 482 | 20 | 26 February 2000 | (United States) Iron Mountain (Pine Mountain Ski Jump K120) | L _{299} | (Germany) Martin Schmitt | (Norway) Tommy Ingebrigtsen | (Austria) Stefan Horngacher | (Germany) Martin Schmitt | |
| 483 | 21 | 27 February 2000 | (United States) Iron Mountain (Pine Mountain Ski Jump K120) | L _{300} | (Germany) Martin Schmitt | (Austria) Andreas Widhölzl | (Austria) Andreas Goldberger | (Germany) Martin Schmitt | |
| 484 | 22 | 4 March 2000 | (Finland) Lahti (Salpausselkä K90, K116) | N _{139} | (Finland) Janne Ahonen | (Germany) Sven Hannawald | (Norway) Lasse Ottesen | (Germany) Martin Schmitt | |
| 485 | 23 | 5 March 2000 | (Finland) Lahti (Salpausselkä K90, K116) | L _{301} | (Germany) Martin Schmitt | (Finland) Janne Ahonen | (Austria) Andreas Goldberger | (Germany) Martin Schmitt | |
| 486 | 24 | 10 March 2000 | (Norway) Trondheim (Granåsen K120) | L _{302} | (Germany) Sven Hannawald | (Finland) Ville Kantee | (Finland) Janne Ahonen | (Germany) Martin Schmitt | |
| 487 | 25 | 12 March 2000 | (Norway) Oslo (Holmenkollbakken K115) | L _{303} | (Germany) Sven Hannawald | (Finland) Ville Kantee | (Finland) Janne Ahonen | (Germany) Martin Schmitt | |
| 4th Nordic Tournament Overall (4 – 12 March 2000) | | | | | (Germany) Sven Hannawald | (Finland) Janne Ahonen | (Finland) Ville Kantee | Nordic Tournament | |
| 488 | 26 | 19 March 2000 | (Slovenia) Planica (Velikanka bratov Gorišek K185) | F _{046} | (Germany) Sven Hannawald | (Finland) Janne Ahonen | (Austria) Andreas Goldberger | (Germany) Martin Schmitt | |
| 21st FIS World Cup Overall (27 November 1999 – 19 March 2000) | | | | | (Germany) Martin Schmitt | (Austria) Andreas Widhölzl | (Finland) Janne Ahonen | World Cup Overall | |

=== Men's Team ===
| All | No. | Date | Place (Hill) | Size | Winner | Second | Third | R. |
|---|---|---|---|---|---|---|---|---|
| 14 | 1 | 25 January 2000 | (Japan) Hakuba (Olympic Hills K120) | L _{014} | Finland Janne Ahonen; Risto Jussilainen; Ville Kantee; Jani Soininen | Germany Sven Hannawald; Hansjörg Jäkle; Martin Schmitt; Michael Uhrmann | Austria Andreas Goldberger; Wolfgang Loitzl; Stefan Horngacher; Andreas Widhölzl | |
| 15 | 2 | 5 March 2000 | (Finland) Lahti (Salpausselkä K116) | L _{015} | Finland Risto Jussilainen; Ville Kantee; Jani Soininen; Janne Ahonen | Austria Andreas Goldberger; Stefan Horngacher; Martin Höllwarth; Andreas Widhölzl | Germany Michael Uhrmann; Frank Löffler; Sven Hannawald; Martin Schmitt | |
| 16 | 3 | 18 March 2000 | (Slovenia) Planica; Velikanka bratov Gorišek K185) | F _{001} | Germany Sven Hannawald; Hansjörg Jäkle; Martin Schmitt; Michael Uhrmann | Finland Ville Kantee; Risto Jussilainen; Jani Soininen; Janne Ahonen | Japan Takanobu Okabe; Kazuyoshi Funaki; Hideharu Miyahira; Noriaki Kasai | |

== Standings ==
=== Overall ===
| Rank | after 26 events | Points |
|---|---|---|
| 1 | (Germany) Martin Schmitt | 1833 |
| 2 | (Austria) Andreas Widhölzl | 1452 |
| 3 | (Finland) Janne Ahonen | 1437 |
| 4 | (Germany) Sven Hannawald | 1065 |
| 5 | (Austria) Andreas Goldberger | 1034 |
| 6 | (Finland) Ville Kantee | 836 |
| 7 | (Finland) Jani Soininen | 734 |
| 8 | (Finland) Risto Jussilainen | 675 |
| 9 | (Austria) Stefan Horngacher | 624 |
| 10 | (Japan) Hideharu Miyahira | 567 |

=== Ski Jumping (JP) Cup ===
| Rank | after 24 events | Points |
|---|---|---|
| 1 | (Germany) Martin Schmitt | 1791 |
| 2 | (Austria) Andreas Widhölzl | 1372 |
| 3 | (Finland) Janne Ahonen | 1317 |
| 4 | (Austria) Andreas Goldberger | 938 |
| 5 | (Germany) Sven Hannawald | 865 |
| 6 | (Finland) Ville Kantee | 800 |
| 7 | (Finland) Jani Soininen | 706 |
| 8 | (Finland) Risto Jussilainen | 665 |
| 9 | (Austria) Stefan Horngacher | 589 |
| 10 | (Japan) Hideharu Miyahira | 523 |

=== Ski Flying ===
| Rank | after 2 events | Points |
|---|---|---|
| 1 | (Germany) Sven Hannawald | 200 |
| 2 | (Finland) Janne Ahonen | 120 |
| 3 | (Norway) Tommy Ingebrigtsen | 110 |
| 4 | (Austria) Andreas Goldberger | 96 |
| 5 | (Austria) Andreas Widhölzl | 80 |
| 6 | (Austria) R. Schwarzenberger | 68 |
| 7 | (Austria) Martin Höllwarth | 58 |
| 8 | (Norway) Lasse Ottesen | 57 |
| 9 | (Japan) Kazuyoshi Funaki | 49 |
| 10 | (Japan) Noriaki Kasai | 46 |

=== Nations Cup ===
| Rank | after 29 events | Points |
|---|---|---|
| 1 | Finland | 5219 |
| 2 | Austria | 4409 |
| 3 | Germany | 4395 |
| 4 | Japan | 2938 |
| 5 | Norway | 1625 |
| 6 | Poland | 530 |
| 7 | Slovenia | 482 |
| 8 | France | 335 |
| 9 | Switzerland | 305 |
| 10 | Czech Republic | 287 |

=== Four Hills Tournament ===
| Rank | after 4 events | Points |
|---|---|---|
| 1 | (Austria) Andreas Widhölzl | 987.8 |
| 2 | (Finland) Janne Ahonen | 963.5 |
| 3 | (Germany) Martin Schmitt | 960.5 |
| 4 | (Germany) Sven Hannawald | 953.0 |
| 5 | (Austria) Andreas Goldberger | 930.9 |
| 6 | (Japan) Masahiko Harada | 902.9 |
| 7 | (Japan) Hideharu Miyahira | 896.6 |
| 8 | (Norway) Lasse Ottesen | 883.8 |
| 9 | (Finland) Ville Kantee | 882.4 |
| 10 | (Finland) Jani Soininen | 870.8 |

=== Nordic Tournament ===
| Rank | after 4 events | Points |
|---|---|---|
| 1 | (Germany) Sven Hannawald | 330 |
| 2 | (Finland) Janne Ahonen | 300 |
| 3 | (Finland) Ville Kantee | 210 |
| 4 | (Austria) Andreas Goldberger | 195 |
| 5 | (Germany) Martin Schmitt | 182 |
| 6 | (Austria) Martin Höllwarth | 180 |
| 7 | (Austria) Andreas Widhölzl | 130 |
| 8 | (Norway) Lasse Ottesen | 122 |
| 9 | (Japan) Noriaki Kasai | 95 |
| 10 | (Finland) Jani Soininen | 85 |

== See also ==
- 1999 Grand Prix (top level summer series)
- 1999–2000 FIS Continental Cup (2nd level competition)
