= Nordic Tournament 2000 =

The 2000 Nordic Tournament was the fourth edition and took place in Lahti, Falun and Oslo between 4–12 March 2000.

== Results ==
Date	Place	Hill	Size	Winner	Second	Third	Ref.
4 Mar 2000	(Finland) Lahti	Salpausselkä K-90 (night)	NH	(Finland) Janne Ahonen	(Germany) Sven Hannawald	(Norway) Lasse Ottesen	
5 Mar 2000	(Finland) Lahti	Salpausselkä K-116 (night)	LH	(Germany) Martin Schmitt	(Finland) Janne Ahonen	(Austria) Andreas Goldberger	
10 Mar 2000	(Norway) Trondheim	Granåsen K-120 (night)	LH	(Germany) Sven Hannawald	(Finland) Ville Kantee	(Finland) Janne Ahonen	
12 Mar 2000	(Norway) Oslo	Holmenkollbakken K-115	LH	(Germany) Sven Hannawald	(Finland) Ville Kantee	(Finland) Janne Ahonen	

== Overall ==
Pos	Ski Jumper	Points
1	(Germany) Sven Hannawald	330
2	(Finland) Janne Ahonen	300
3	(Finland) Ville Kantee	210
4	(Austria) Andreas Goldberger	195
5	(Germany) Martin Schmitt	182
6	(Austria) Martin Höllwarth	180
7	(Austria) Andreas Widhölzl	130
8	(Norway) Lasse Ottesen	122
9	(Japan) Noriaki Kasai	95
10	(Finland) Jani Soininen	85
