= Arabs in Aspic =

Norwegian progressive rock band

- Origin: Trondheim, Norway
- Genre: Progressive rock
- Years active: 1997–2004, 2006-present
- Labels: Pancromatic, Black Widow Records, Apollon Records, Karisma Records
- Members: Jostein Smeby; Eskil Nyhus; Stig Arve Jørgensen; Erik Paulsen; Alessandro Elide
- Past members: Tommy Ingebrigtsen; Terje Nyhus; Magnar Krutvik
- Website: www.arabsinaspic.org

Arabs in Aspic, at times also Arabs in Aspic II, is a progressive rock band formed in 1997. They are considered one of Norway's "leading retro-prog bands."

== History ==
Arabs in Aspic formed in 1997 as a Black Sabbath cover band and included lead guitarist and vocalist Jostein Smeby, Tommy Ingebrigtsen (rhythm guitarist and theremin player), Hammond organ player Magnar Krutvik, and brothers Eskil and Terje Nyhus, acting as drummer and bassist respectively.

Ingebrigtsen's recognition as a ski jumping world champion, coupled with the other members' passion for the sport, earned them the title of being a "ski jumping band" - an attribution the band later worked to dismiss.

Arabs of Aspic took their name from the King Crimson album Larks' Tongues in Aspic, out of reverence for the record. A book on the topic of cricket entitled Arabs in Aspic was then found by chance on eBay, and the name was assumed for the band.

After the debut release, the group was joined by Stig Arve Jørgensen. He contributed background vocals and took over as organ player after Krutvik switched to acoustic guitar and synthesizer. Following the release of the album Far Out in Aradabia in 2004, the band went on a hiatus.

=== Arabs in Aspic II ===
In 2006, Smeby, Eskil Nyhus and Jørgensen joined forces with new bassist Erik Paulsen to form Arabs in Aspic II. Several demos were recorded in the subsequent years, before the band recorded the album Strange Frame of Mind in the studio of TNT guitarist Ronni LeTekro, in 2009. The album received critical acclaim upon its release, with the LP version appearing in 2012. Following the release, the band dropped the "II" suffix and continued under the name Arabs in Aspic. In 2019, long-time live and session percussionist Alessandro Elide became a permanent member of the band.

== Style ==
From its inception, Smeby was the primary songwriter of the group. In addition to Black Sabbath, he cited stoner rock and classical modernism as influences, while other band members drew inspiration from progressive rock staples such as Genesis, King Crimson and Yes, as well as other genres such as music of the Balkans, fusion, jazz and more. These eclectic and varying sources of music influence provided the foundation for the group's sound.

As a result of their influences, the group's sound has been described as a combination of "typical Scandinavian, slightly elegiac retro-prog with a good portion of hard rock."

== Critical reception ==
The debut album Progeria, first released in 2003 via Børse Music, received international reviews, especially after its re-release via Karisma Records. The reviews of the remastered version of the album were mostly positive. Jochen Rinfrey for Babyblaue Seiten wrote the release is "a short but nice combination of psychedelic retroprog and hard rock interludes", which however "still lacks the sophistication of the group's later albums." On Metal Factory the album was praised as "very interesting" for "70s and prog rock fans". Mario Wolski from Saitenkult, on the other hand, criticised that the album "[was] much too short to pass as a full album."

The follow up album Far Out In Aradabia, continued to receive positive reviews with Jon Davis of Exposé, reporting "the band also show more independence and creativity on the release." Meanwhile, the track Butterpriest Jam, which was only added for the re-release, divided reviewers. It was praised by some as "19 minutes of first-rate improv rock" while others such as Eric Porter of Sea of Tranquility and Jon Davis of Exposé found it boring and tedious.

The band's third album Strange Frame of Mind was called "very well" done, "technically perfectly implemented, [...] very colourful and imaginatively orchestrated and therefore all in all very varied."

Picture in a Dream was seen as evidence of the band's ongoing qualitative improvement and love for 1970s music.

Victim of Your Father's Agony continues with progressive rock, but in "their very own way." Jürgen Meurer of Betreutes Proggen also praised the album's reliably "good-humoured 70s-inspired prog" and only criticised the playing time of 38 minutes.

Syndenes Magi was praised by Thoralf Koß for Musikreviews.de as a "retro-progressive masterpiece from Norway, atmospherically moving between KING CRIMSON and PINK FLOYD".

By the bands seventh album, Magic and Madness, they became a leading retro-prog band in Norway. Andreas Schiffmann declared the album "an abrasion-proof long-runner with addictive potential and a contender for the title 'Prog Record of the Year'". Other reviews were also full of praise, saying that the album was a "firework of ingenious ideas, of great songs performed with unbeatable nonchalance". Others were critical, such as by Frank Jäger of Powermetal.de, about the production being too uniform. The album was repeatedly criticised for its lack of originality.

== Discography ==
Full Length

- 2003: Progeria [mini album] (Børse Music)
- 2004: Far Out in Aradabia (Børse Music)
- 2010: Strange Frame of Mind (Pancromatic)
- 2013: Picture in a Dream (Black Widow Records)
- 2015: Victim of Your Father’s Agony (Black Widow Records)
- 2017: Syndenes Magi (Apollon Records: PROG/Børse Music)
- 2020: Madness & Magic (Karisma Records/Børse Music)
- 2023: The Magic of Sin (Karsima Records/Børse Music) [reworking of Syndenes Magi with English lyrics]

Live

- 2018: Live at Avantgarden (Apollon Records: PROG/Børse Music)

Compilations

- 2011: Progeria / Far Out in Aradabia (Pancromatic)
- 2021: I – III (Karisma Records/Børse Music)
- 2024: IV – VI (Karisma Records/Børse Music)

Singles & EPs

- 2015: Sad Without You / Italian Class / TV 3 (Crispin Glover Records)
- 2015: Prevail to Fail / Pictures in a Dream (feat. Rune Sundby, Crispin Glover Records)
- 2018: De Dødes Tjern / Step into the Fire (Apollon Records: PROG/Børse Music)
- 2022: Baklandet Café / Dyrevise (feat. Øystein Dolmen, Crispin Glover Records)

== Members ==
=== Current members ===
- Jostein Smeby – guitar, vocals (1997–2004, 2006–present)
- Eskil Nyhus – drums (2002*–2004, 2006–present)
- Stig Arve Jørgensen – keyboards, acoustic guitar, vocals (2004, 2006–present)
- Erik Paulsen – bass (2006–present)
- Alessandro Elide – percussion (2018–present)

=== Former Members ===
- Tommy Ingebrigtsen – rhythm guitar, theremin (1997–2004)
- Terje Nyhus – bass (2002*–2004)
- Magnar Krutvik – keyboards, acoustic guitar (2003–2004)

(*) Eskil and Terje Nyhus played on the band's October 2002 demo; it is unclear how long they were members prior.
