= 1998–99 FIS Ski Jumping World Cup =

Ski jumping championship season

1998–99 World Cup
Winners
- Overall: (Germany) Martin Schmitt
- Ski Jumping (NH, LH): (Finland) Janne Ahonen
- Ski Flying: (Germany) Martin Schmitt
- Four Hills Tournament: (Finland) Janne Ahonen
- Nordic Tournament: (Japan) Noriaki Kasai
- Nations Cup: Japan

Competitions
- Venues: 19
- Individual: 29
- Team: 1
- Rescheduled: 2

The 1998–99 FIS Ski Jumping World Cup was the 20th World Cup season in ski jumping and the 9th official World Cup season in ski flying with ninth small crystal globe awarded.

The season began in Lillehammer, Norway on 28 November 1998 and finished in Planica, Slovenia on 21 March 1999. The individual World Cup overall winner was Martin Schmitt, who also won Ski Flying small crystal globe. The Nations Cup was taken by Team of Japan.

29 men's individual events on 19 different venues in 12 countries were held in two different continents (Europe and Asia); both ski flying events in Harrachov were rescheduled due to crash of wind protection construction (one on large hill) and one at the end of season in Planica.

At the end of the season in Planica, two world records were set. First, during Friday's competition—the rescheduled event from Harrachov—German ski jumper Martin Schmitt crashed at incredible 219 metres, but later that day officially broke the two-year-old world record by landing cleanly at 214.5 metres. The next day Tommy Ingebrigtsen set another world record at 219.5 m (only slow motion footage is available).

Peaks of the season were FIS Nordic World Ski Championships and Four Hills Tournament.

== World records ==
List of world record distances (both official and invalid) achieved within this World Cup season.

Date	Athlete	Hill	Round	Place	Metres	Feet
19 March 1999	(Germany) Martin Schmitt	Velikanka bratov Gorišek K185	Round 1	Planica, Slovenia	219	719
19 March 1999	(Germany) Martin Schmitt	Velikanka bratov Gorišek K185	Final	Planica, Slovenia	214.5	704
20 March 1999	(Norway) Tommy Ingebrigtsen	Velikanka bratov Gorišek K185	Trial	Planica, Slovenia	219.5	720

Longest jump in history at that time, but invalid due to Schmitt crashed upon landing.

== Map of world cup hosts ==
Europe
Germany	Austria	Asia

== Calendar ==
=== Men's Individual ===
N – normal hill / L – large hill / F – flying hill
All	No.	Date	Place (Hill)	Size	Winner	Second	Third	Overall leader	R.
434	1	28 November 1998	(Norway) Lillehammer (Lysgårdsbakken K120)	L _{259}	(Germany) Martin Schmitt	(Finland) Janne Ahonen	(Germany) Sven Hannawald	(Germany) Martin Schmitt	
435	2	29 November 1998	(Norway) Lillehammer (Lysgårdsbakken K120)	L _{260}	(Germany) Martin Schmitt	(Finland) Janne Ahonen	(Japan) Kazuyoshi Funaki	(Germany) Martin Schmitt	
436	3	5 December 1998	(France) Chamonix (Le Mont K95)	N _{135}	(Germany) Martin Schmitt	(Finland) Janne Ahonen	(Japan) Kazuyoshi Funaki	(Germany) Martin Schmitt	
437	4	6 December 1998	(France) Chamonix (Le Mont K95)	N _{136}	(Finland) Janne Ahonen	(Japan) Kazuyoshi Funaki	(Germany) Martin Schmitt	(Germany) Martin Schmitt	
438	5	8 December 1998	(Italy) Predazzo (Trampolino dal Ben K120)	L _{261}	(Germany) Martin Schmitt	(Japan) Kazuyoshi Funaki	(Japan) Noriaki Kasai	(Germany) Martin Schmitt	
439	6	12 December 1998	(Germany) Oberhof (Hans-Renner-Schanze K120)	L _{262}	(Austria) Andreas Widhölzl	(Germany) Martin Schmitt	(Germany) Sven Hannawald	(Germany) Martin Schmitt	
440	7	19 December 1998	(Czech Republic) Harrachov (Čerťák K120)	L _{263}	(Finland) Janne Ahonen	(Germany) Ronny Hornschuh	(Japan) Kazuyoshi Funaki	(Germany) Martin Schmitt	
441	8	20 December 1998	(Czech Republic) Harrachov (Čerťák K120)	L _{264}	(Finland) Janne Ahonen	(Japan) Noriaki Kasai	(Austria) Andreas Widhölzl	(Finland) Janne Ahonen	
442	9	30 December 1998	(Germany) Oberstdorf (Schattenbergschanze K115)	L _{265}	(Germany) Martin Schmitt	(Austria) Andreas Goldberger	(Japan) Noriaki Kasai	(Finland) Janne Ahonen	
443	10	1 January 1999	(Germany) Garmisch-Pa (Große Olympiaschanze K115)	L _{266}	(Germany) Martin Schmitt	(Finland) Janne Ahonen	(Japan) Noriaki Kasai	(Germany) Martin Schmitt	
444	11	3 January 1999	(Austria) Innsbruck (Bergiselschanze K110)	L _{267}	(Japan) Noriaki Kasai	(Finland) Janne Ahonen	(Japan) Hideharu Miyahira	(Finland) Janne Ahonen	
445	12	6 January 1999	(Austria) Bischofshofen (Paul-Ausserleitner K120)	L _{268}	(Austria) Andreas Widhölzl	(Finland) Janne Ahonen	(Japan) Hideharu Miyahira	(Finland) Janne Ahonen	
47th Four Hills Tournament Overall (30 December 1998 – 6 January 1999)					(Finland) Janne Ahonen	(Japan) Noriaki Kasai	(Japan) Hideharu Miyahira	4H Tournament	
446	13	9 January 1999	(Switzerland) Engelberg (Gross-Titlis-Schanze K120)	L _{269}	(Finland) Janne Ahonen	(Japan) Kazuyoshi Funaki	(Japan) Noriaki Kasai (Germany) Martin Schmitt	(Finland) Janne Ahonen	
447	14	10 January 1999	(Switzerland) Engelberg (Gross-Titlis-Schanze K120)	L _{270}	(Japan) Kazuyoshi Funaki	(Austria) Andreas Widhölzl	(Japan) Noriaki Kasai	(Finland) Janne Ahonen	
448	15	16 January 1999	(Poland) Zakopane (Wielka Krokiew K116)	L _{271}	(Austria) Stefan Horngacher	(Finland) Janne Ahonen	(Norway) T. Ingebrigtsen	(Finland) Janne Ahonen	
449	16	17 January 1999	(Poland) Zakopane (Wielka Krokiew K116)	L _{272}	(Finland) Janne Ahonen	(Japan) Kazuyoshi Funaki	(Austria) Stefan Horngacher	(Finland) Janne Ahonen	
450	17	23 January 1999	(Japan) Sapporo (Ōkurayama K120)	L _{273}	(Germany) Martin Schmitt	(Japan) Hideharu Miyahira	(Germany) Dieter Thoma	(Finland) Janne Ahonen	
451	18	24 January 1999	(Japan) Sapporo (Ōkurayama K120)	L _{274}	(Japan) Kazuyoshi Funaki	(Germany) Martin Schmitt	(Japan) Hideharu Miyahira	(Finland) Janne Ahonen	
452	19	29 January 1999	(Germany) Willingen (Mühlenkopfschanze K120)	L _{275}	(Japan) Noriaki Kasai	(Germany) Martin Schmitt	(Japan) Kazuyoshi Funaki	(Finland) Janne Ahonen	
453	20	31 January 1999	(Germany) Willingen (Mühlenkopfschanze K120)	L _{276}	(Japan) Noriaki Kasai	(Austria) Andreas Widhölzl	(Japan) Kazuyoshi Funaki	(Finland) Janne Ahonen	
		6 February 1999	(Czech Republic) Harrachov (Čerťák K185, K120)	F _{cnx}	Thursday/Fridary storm demolished wind curtain protection construction (that's why competition was rescheduled to Planica on 19 March)			—	
		7 February 1999	(Czech Republic) Harrachov (Čerťák K185, K120)	F _{cnx}	Thursday/Fridary storm demolished wind curtain protection construction (that's why competition was moved to large hill)			—	
454	21	(Note: Cancelled ski flying event from Harrachov (7 February) was moved to large hill on same day.)7 February 1999	(Czech Republic) Harrachov (Čerťák K185, K120)	L _{277}	(Finland) Janne Ahonen	(Norway) Lasse Ottesen	(Czech Republic) Jakub Sucháček	(Finland) Janne Ahonen	
FIS Nordic World Ski Championships 1999 (21 – 26 February • (Austria) Ramsau am Dachstein)
455	22	4 March 1999	(Finland) Kuopio (Puijo K120)	L _{278}	(Germany) Martin Schmitt	(Japan) Kazuyoshi Funaki	(Japan) Noriaki Kasai	(Finland) Janne Ahonen	
456	23	6 March 1999	(Finland) Lahti (Salpausselkä K90)	N _{137}	(Japan) Kazuyoshi Funaki	(Austria) R. Schwarzenberger	(Germany) Sven Hannawald	(Finland) Janne Ahonen	
457	24	9 March 1999	(Norway) Trondheim (Granåsen K120)	L _{279}	(Japan) Noriaki Kasai	(Austria) Stefan Horngacher	(Japan) Masahiko Harada	(Finland) Janne Ahonen	
458	25	11 March 1999	(Sweden) Falun (Lugnet K115)	L _{280}	(Germany) Martin Schmitt	(Japan) Hideharu Miyahira	(Japan) Masahiko Harada	(Finland) Janne Ahonen	
459	26	14 March 1999	(Norway) Oslo (Holmenkollbakken K115)	L _{281}	(Japan) Noriaki Kasai	(Germany) Martin Schmitt	(Japan) Kazuyoshi Funaki	(Finland) Janne Ahonen	
3rd Nordic Tournament Overall (6 – 14 March 1999)					(Japan) Noriaki Kasai	(Japan) Kazuyoshi Funaki	(Germany) Sven Hannawald	Nordic Tournament	
460	27	(Note: Cancelled ski flying event from Harrachov (6 February) was rescheduled to Planica on Friday (19 March).)19 March 1999	(Slovenia) Planica (Velikanka bratov Gorišek K185)	F _{042}	(Germany) Martin Schmitt	(Japan) Kazuyoshi Funaki	(Germany) Christof Duffner	(Finland) Janne Ahonen	
461	28	20 March 1999	(Slovenia) Planica (Velikanka bratov Gorišek K185)	F _{043}	(Japan) Hideharu Miyahira	(Germany) Martin Schmitt	(Japan) Noriaki Kasai	(Germany) Martin Schmitt	
462	29	21 March 1999	(Slovenia) Planica (Velikanka bratov Gorišek K185)	F _{044}	(Japan) Noriaki Kasai	(Japan) Hideharu Miyahira	(Germany) Martin Schmitt	(Germany) Martin Schmitt	
20th FIS World Cup Overall (28 November 1998 – 21 March 1999)					(Germany) Martin Schmitt	(Finland) Janne Ahonen	(Japan) Noriaki Kasai	World Cup Overall	

=== Men's Team ===
All	No.	Date	Place (Hill)	Size	Winner	Second	Third	R.
13	1	30 January 1999	(Germany) Willingen (Mühlenkopfschanze K120)	L _{013}	Japan Kazuyoshi Funaki; Noriaki Kasai; Hideharu Miyahira; Kazuya Yoshioka	Austria Reinhard Schwarzenberger; Wolfgang Loitzl; Stefan Horngacher; Andreas Widhölzl	Germany Sven Hannawald; Hansjörg Jäkle; Martin Schmitt; Dieter Thoma	

== Standings ==
=== Overall ===
Rank	after 29 events	Points
1	(Germany) Martin Schmitt	1753
2	(Finland) Janne Ahonen	1695
3	(Japan) Noriaki Kasai	1603
4	(Japan) Kazuyoshi Funaki	1589
5	(Japan) Hideharu Miyahira	934
6	(Germany) Sven Hannawald	896
7	(Austria) Andreas Widhölzl	833
8	(Austria) Stefan Horngacher	813
9	(Japan) Masahiko Harada	720
10	(Germany) Dieter Thoma	555

=== Ski Jumping (JP) Cup ===
Rank	after 26 events	Points
1	(Finland) Janne Ahonen	1589
2	(Germany) Martin Schmitt	1513
3	(Japan) Kazuyoshi Funaki	1423
4	(Japan) Noriaki Kasai	1388
5	(Germany) Sven Hannawald	806
6	(Austria) Andreas Widhölzl	801
7	(Austria) Stefan Horngacher	763
8	(Japan) Hideharu Miyahira	755
9	(Japan) Masahiko Harada	627
10	(Germany) Dieter Thoma	537

=== Ski Flying ===
Rank	after 3 events	Points
1	(Germany) Martin Schmitt	240
2	(Japan) Noriaki Kasai	210
3	(Japan) Hideharu Miyahira	180
4	(Japan) Kazuyoshi Funaki	166
5	(Germany) Christof Duffner	116
6	(Finland) Janne Ahonen	106
7	(Norway) Kristian Brenden	99
8	(Japan) Masahiko Harada	93
9	(Germany) Sven Hannawald	90
10	(Norway) Olav Magne Dønnem	72

=== Nations Cup ===
Rank	after 30 events	Points
1	Japan	6201
2	Germany	4394
3	Austria	3586
4	Norway	2494
5	Finland	2457
6	Slovenia	598
7	Czech Republic	547
8	France	500
9	Switzerland	291
10	Italy	199

=== Four Hills Tournament ===
Rank	after 4 events	Points
1	(Finland) Janne Ahonen	960.6
2	(Japan) Noriaki Kasai	953.0
3	(Japan) Hideharu Miyahira	916.8
4	(Germany) Martin Schmitt	915.6
5	(Japan) Kazuyoshi Funaki	905.0
6	(Japan) Kazuya Yoshioka	897.5
7	(Austria) Stefan Horngacher	890.7
8	(Japan) Masahiko Harada	882.1
9	(Austria) Andreas Goldberger	871.3
10	(Germany) Dieter Thoma	850.2

=== Nordic Tournament ===
Rank	after 4 events	Points
1	(Japan) Noriaki Kasai	608.8
2	(Japan) Kazuyoshi Funaki	600.6
3	(Germany) Sven Hannawald	591.7
4	(Japan) Masahiko Harada	583.7
5	(Finland) Janne Ahonen	577.7
6	(Japan) Hideharu Miyahira	564.8
7	(Austria) R. Schwarzenberger	550.9
8	(Austria) Stefan Horngacher	545.7
9	(Austria) Wolfgang Loitzl	537.6
10	(Czech Republic) Jakub Sucháček	533.0

== See also ==
- 1998 Grand Prix (top level summer series)
- 1998–99 FIS Continental Cup (2nd level competition)
