= Dennis Störl =

German ski jumper (born 1979)

Personal information
- Born: 3 October 1979 (age 47)

Sport
- Sport: Skiing
- Club: WSV Johanngeorgenstadt

World Cup career
- Seasons: 2001
- Indiv. podiums: 0
- Indiv. wins: 0

Dennis Störl (born 3 October 1979) is a retired German ski jumper.

In the World Cup he finished once among the top 15, with an eleventh place from Willingen in February 2001. He finished third overall in the Continental Cup in the 1990/00 season.
