= Ville Kantee =

Finnish ski jumper

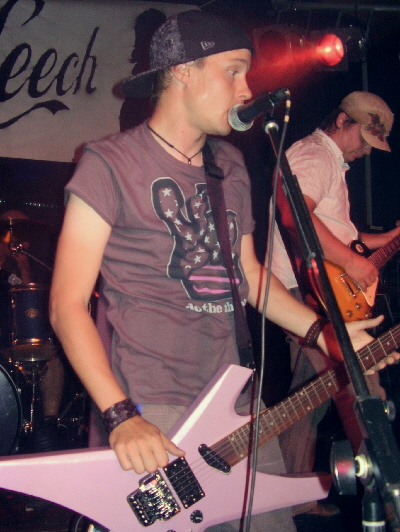

Personal information
- Full name: Ville Valtteri Kantee
- Nationality: Finland
- Born: 8 December 1978 (age 47) Joutseno, Finland
- Height: 1.78 m (5 ft 10 in)

Sport
- Sport: Skiing

World Cup career
- Seasons: 1997–2002
- Indiv. starts: 93
- Indiv. podiums: 6
- Indiv. wins: 2
- Team starts: 6
- Team podiums: 5
- Team wins: 3

Achievements and titles
- Personal bests: 223.5 m (733 ft); Planica, 18 March 2000
Medal record
Men's ski jumping
FIS Nordic World Ski Championships
Silver medal – second place	2001 Lahti	Team NH
Silver medal – second place	2001 Lahti	Team LH
- Updated on 10 February 2016

Ville Valtteri Kantee (born 8 December 1978) is a Finnish former ski jumper who competed at World Cup level from 1996 to 2002.

== Career ==
Kantee won two team (large and normal hill) silver medals at the 2001 FIS Nordic World Ski Championships in Lahti, as well as finishing ninth in the individual large hill event at those same championships. He also finished 23rd in the 2000 Ski Flying World Championships. At World Cup level he won two individual events, both on large hills, in Kuopio (28 November 1999) and Willingen (3 February 2001). His best overall finish was sixth in the 1999/00 season. Kantee retired in 2004 after spending his final seasons in the Continental Cup.

== World Cup ==
=== Standings ===
Season	Overall	4H	SF	NT	JP
1996/97	20	31	29	15	20
1997/98	54	40	—	41	51
1998/99	28	—	25	11	30
1999/00	6	9	15	5	6
2000/01	17	11	41	61	N/A
2001/02	63	—	N/A	—	N/A

=== Wins ===
No.	Season	Date	Location	Hill	Size
1	1999/00	28 November 1999	(Finland) Kuopio	Puijo K120 (night)	LH
2	2000/01	3 February 2001	(Germany) Willingen	Mühlenkopfschanze K120	LH
