= Sven Hannawald =

German ski jumper (born 1974)

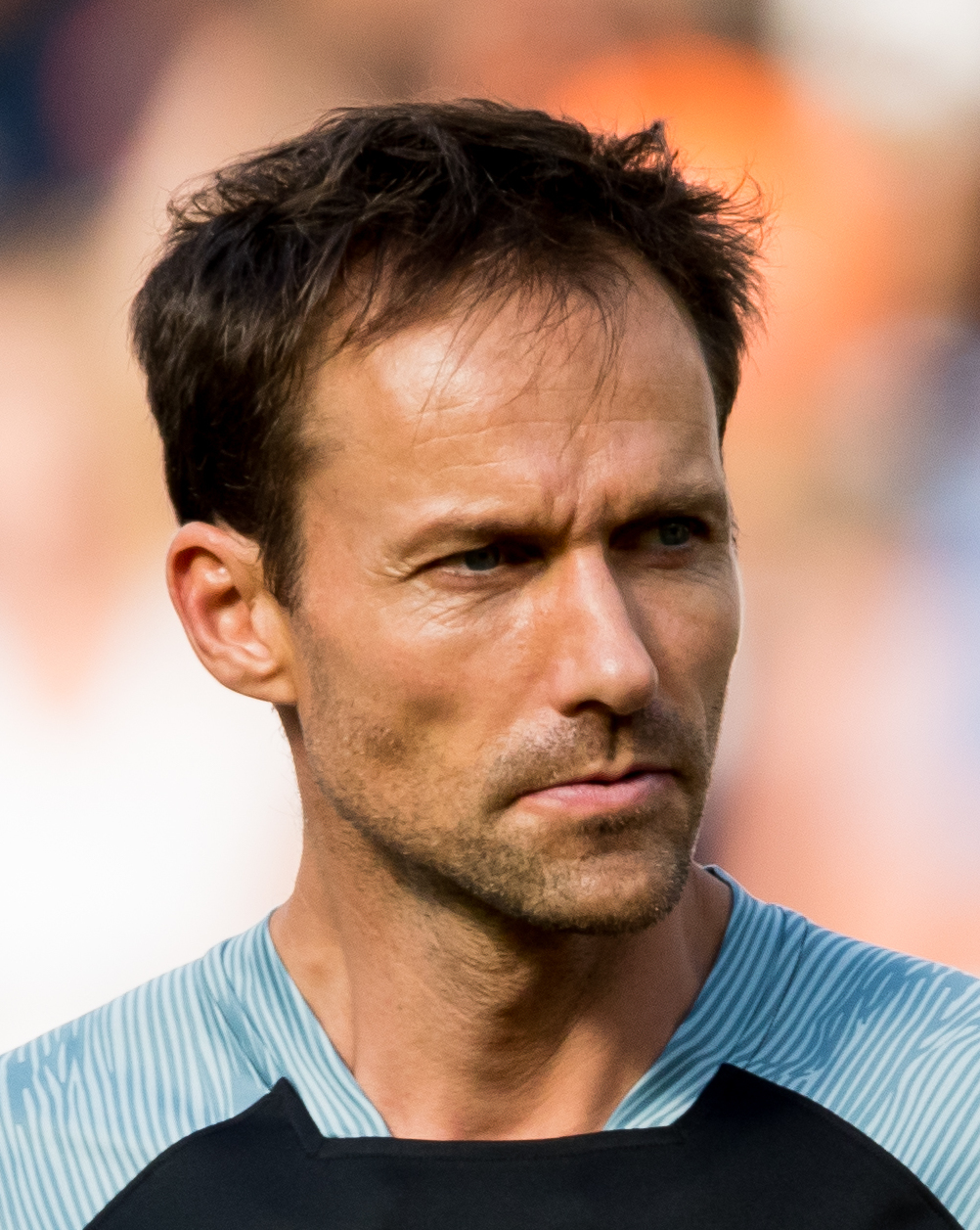
- Hannawald in 2019

Personal information
- Nationality: Germany
- Born: 9 November 1974 (age 51) Erlabrunn, East Germany
- Height: 1.84 m (6 ft 1/2 in)

Sport
- Sport: Skiing

World Cup career
- Seasons: 1993–2004
- Indiv. starts: 174
- Indiv. podiums: 40
- Indiv. wins: 18
- Team starts: 11
- Team podiums: 7
- Team wins: 1
- Four Hills titles: 1 (2002)
- Ski Flying titles: 2 (1998, 2000)

Achievements and titles
- Personal bests: 220 m (720 ft); Planica, 23 March 2002
Medal record
Men's ski jumping
Olympic Games
Gold medal – first place	2002 Salt Lake City	Team LH
Silver medal – second place	1998 Nagano	Team LH
Silver medal – second place	2002 Salt Lake City	Individual NH
World Championships
Gold medal – first place	1999 Ramsau	Team LH
Gold medal – first place	2001 Lahti	Team LH
Silver medal – second place	1999 Ramsau	Individual LH
Bronze medal – third place	2001 Lahti	Team NH
Men's ski flying
World Championships
Gold medal – first place	2000 Vikersund	Individual
Gold medal – first place	2002 Harrachov	Individual
Silver medal – second place	1998 Oberstdorf	Individual
- Updated on 10 February 2016

Sven Hannawald (German pronunciation: [svɛn ˈhanaˌvalt]; born 9 November 1974) is a German former ski jumper. Having competed from 1992 to 2004, his career highlight was winning the 2002 Four Hills Tournament, when he also became the first athlete to win all four events of said tournament. He also finished runner-up twice in the World Cup season, winning four medals at the Ski Jumping World Championships, as well as three medals each at the Winter Olympic Games and Ski Flying World Championships.

== Early life ==
Hannawald was born in Erlabrunn and grew up in the nearby town of Johanngeorgenstadt by SC Dynamo Johanngeorgenstadt in the Ore Mountains. At age twelve, he was sent to a special school for young athletes in Klingenthal (SG Dynamo Klingenthal), also in Saxony. In 1991 his family moved to Jettingen-Scheppach near Ulm where he transferred to the Furtwangen Ski Boarding School, where he completed an apprenticeship in Communication Electronics.

== Ski jumping career ==
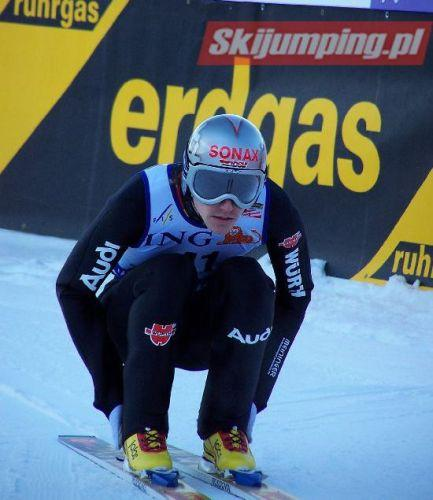
Hannawald in 2004

In 1998, Hannawald won a silver medal at the 1998 Ski Flying World Championships in Oberstdorf as well as a silver medal at the Olympic Games in Nagano in the team large hill event.

In the 1998/99 season, he finished in fifth place overall in World Cup Ski Jumping. At the world championships in Ramsau, he won a silver medal in the individual large hill behind Martin Schmitt, and a gold medal in the team large hill event.

In 2000, Hannawald won the Ski-flying World Championships in Vikersund. He also won the ski jumping competition at the Holmenkollen ski festival that year.

In the 2000/01 season, Hannawald won gold in the team large hill event and bronze in the team normal hill event at the world championships in Lahti.

The following winter of 2001/02 was the most successful of his career: Hannawald ended second in the World Cup, winning all four Individual jumping titles at the Four Hills Tournament, the first to do so. He successfully defended his title of Ski Flying World Champion. At the Olympic Winter Games in Salt Lake City, he won gold in the team large hill and silver in the individual normal hill, and was even nominated for Sportsman of the Year in Germany. Despite all of his successes, however, Hannawald could not top Adam Malysz in the overall World Cup ranking.

In the 2002/03 season, Hannawald finished again second in the world rankings and managed to set another highlight of his career: at the Worldcup competition in Willingen, Germany, he became the third person in history to achieve perfect marks from all five judges (20 points maximum) – 27 years after the first one (Anton Innauer) and five years after the second one (Kazuyoshi Funaki). This mark has been matched only about one hour later at the same World Cup competition by Hideharu Miyahira, who finished sixth. Then it took another six years until Wolfgang Loitzl at Bischofshofen, Austria in 2009 during the 2008/09 Four Hills Tournament became the fifth one.

In the 2003/04 season, Hannawald performed well below personal expectations. His best result was fourth in Trondheim. As a consequence of that, Hannawald ended his season prematurely. On 29 April 2004, he revealed that he was suffering from burnout and had put himself into psychiatric treatment. During this time, Hannawald managed to recover and reappeared to the public.

On 3 August 2005, Hannawald ended his career as a ski jumper, explaining through his managers that, after successfully dealing with his burnout, he no longer wished to suffer the stresses of professional sport.

== Post-retirement ==
On 26 September 2008, Hannawald signed a two-year contract with the football club TSV Burgau of the German Kreisliga, where he played as a striker.

In 2010, Hannawald made his debut as a racing driver in the ADAC GT Masters. He drove his first race on 10 April 2010 at Motorsport Arena Oschersleben.

== World Cup results ==
=== Standings ===
Season	Overall	4H	SF	NT	JP
1992/93	—	59	—	N/A	N/A
1993/94	90	60	—	N/A	N/A
1994/95	63	—	—	N/A	N/A
1995/96	—	65	—	N/A	—
1996/97	59	34	—	55	55
1997/98	6	2nd place, silver medalist(s)	1st place, gold medalist(s)	2nd place, silver medalist(s)	9
1998/99	6	11	9	3rd place, bronze medalist(s)	5
1999/00	4	4	1st place, gold medalist(s)	2nd place, silver medalist(s)	5
2000/01	9	4	9	—	N/A
2001/02	2nd place, silver medalist(s)	1st place, gold medalist(s)	N/A	3rd place, bronze medalist(s)	N/A
2002/03	2nd place, silver medalist(s)	2nd place, silver medalist(s)	N/A	4	N/A
2003/04	24	12	N/A	—	N/A

=== Wins ===
No.	Season	Date	Location	Hill	Size
1	1997/98	6 January 1998	(Austria) Bischofshofen	Paul-Ausserleitner-Schanze K120	LH
2	1997/98	24 January 1998	(Germany) Oberstdorf	Heini-Klopfer-Skiflugschanze K185	FH
3	1999/00	19 February 2000	(Austria) Tauplitz/Bad Mitterndorf	Kulm K185	FH
4	1999/00	10 March 2000	(Norway) Trondheim	Granåsen K120 (night)	LH
5	1999/00	12 March 2000	(Norway) Oslo	Holmenkollbakken K115	LH
6	1999/00	19 March 2000	(Slovenia) Planica	Letalnica bratov Gorišek K185	FH
7	2001/02	2 December 2001	(Germany) Titisee-Neustadt	Hochfirstschanze K120 (night)	LH
8	2001/02	30 December 2001	(Germany) Oberstdorf	Schattenbergschanze K115	LH
9	2001/02	1 January 2002	(Germany) Garmisch-Partenkirchen	Große Olympiaschanze K115	LH
10	2001/02	4 January 2002	(Austria) Innsbruck	Bergiselschanze K120	LH
11	2001/02	6 January 2002	(Austria) Bischofshofen	Paul-Ausserleitner-Schanze K120	LH
12	2001/02	12 January 2002	(Germany) Willingen	Mühlenkopfschanze K130	LH
13	2002/03	22 December 2002	(Switzerland) Engelberg	Gross-Titlis-Schanze K125	LH
14	2002/03	29 December 2002	(Germany) Oberstdorf	Schattenbergschanze K115	LH
15	2002/03	18 January 2003	(Poland) Zakopane	Wielka Krokiew K120	LH
16	2002/03	19 January 2003	(Poland) Zakopane	Wielka Krokiew K120	LH
17	2002/03	2 February 2003	(Austria) Tauplitz/Bad Mitterndorf	Kulm K185	FH
18	2002/03	8 February 2003	(Germany) Willingen	Mühlenkopfschanze K130	LH

Awards
Previous: Erik Zabel	German Sportsman of the Year; 2002	Next: Jan Ullrich
