= Kazuki Nishishita =

Japanese ski jumper

Personal information
- Born: 14 October 1981 (age 44)

Sport
- Sport: Skiing

World Cup career
- Seasons: 1998-2001, 2004
- Indiv. wins: 0

Kazuki Nishishita (born 14 October 1981) is a Japanese ski jumper.

In the World Cup he finished twice among the top 10, his highest place being seventh from January 2000 in Sapporo.
