= Thomas Hörl =

Austrian ski jumper

Personal information
- Full name: Thomas Hörl
- Nationality: Austria
- Born: 20 August 1981 (age 44) Saalfelden, Austria

Sport
- Sport: Skiing

World Cup career
- Seasons: 2000–2003

Achievements and titles
- Personal bests: 224.5 m (737 ft); Planica, 16 March 2000
- Updated on 18 May 2015

Thomas Hörl (born 20 August 1981) is an Austrian former ski jumper who competed from 1997 to 2003.

== Career ==
After winning the Alpen Cup in 1996 at the age of fifteen, together with medalling in junior level competitions, Hörl started his senior level World Cup career in Bischofshofen on 8 January 2000. At the end of that season, on 16 March 2000 in Planica, he set a world record jump of 224.5 m (737 ft).

Hörl retired from ski jumping after the 2003 Continental Cup season.

== Ski jumping world record ==
Date	Hill	Location	Metres	Feet
16 March 2000	Velikanka bratov Gorišek K185	Planica, Slovenia	224.5	737

Records
Preceded by Tommy Ingebrigtsen	World's longest ski jump 224.5 m (737 ft); 16 March 2000 – 18 March 2000	Succeeded by Andreas Goldberger
