= Tommy Ingebrigtsen =

Norwegian ski jumper

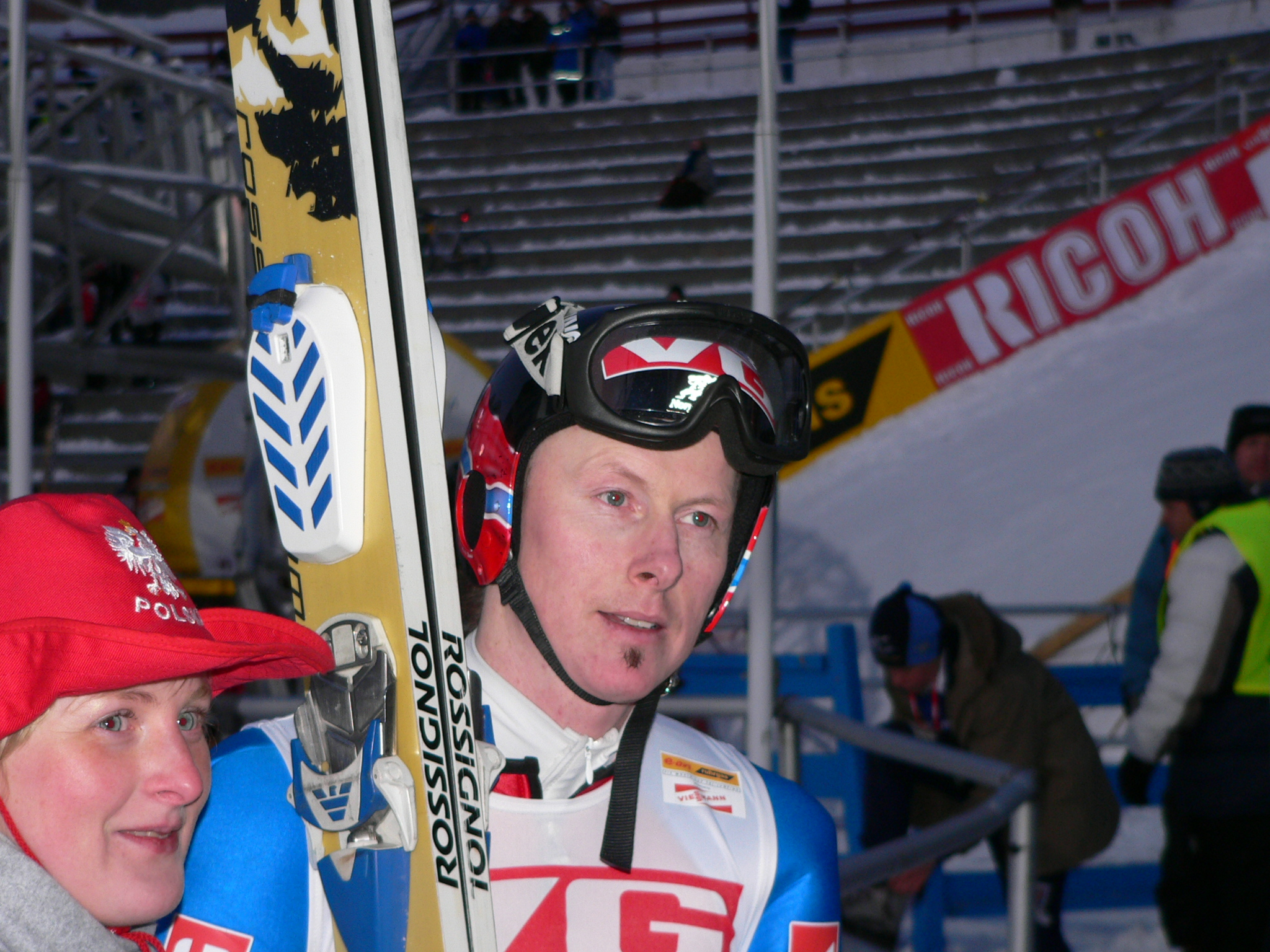
- Ingebrigtsen in Oslo, 2005

Personal information
- Full name: Tommy Ingebrigtsen
- Nationality: Norway
- Born: 8 August 1977 (age 48) Trondheim, Norway

Sport
- Sport: Skiing

World Cup career
- Seasons: 1994–2006
- Indiv. podiums: 5
- Team podiums: 5
- Team wins: 3

Achievements and titles
- Personal bests: 231 m (758 ft); Planica, 20 March 2005
Medal record
Representing Norway
Men's ski jumping
Olympic Games
Bronze medal – third place	2006 Turin	Team large hill
World Championships
Gold medal – first place	1995 Thunder Bay	Individual large hill
Silver medal – second place	2003 Val di Fiemme	Individual normal hill
Bronze medal – third place	2003 Val di Fiemme	Team large hill
Men's ski flying
World Championships
Gold medal – first place	2004 Planica	Team
Gold medal – first place	2006 Bad Mitterndorf	Team
- Updated on 17 May 2015

Tommy Ingebrigtsen (born 8 August 1977) is a Norwegian former ski jumper who competed from 1993 to 2007, representing Byåsen IL in Trondheim. He won the large hill competition at the 1995 Nordic World Ski Championships in Thunder Bay, at the age of seventeen. Ingebrigtsen also competed in two Winter Olympics, earning a bronze in the team large hill event at Turin in 2006. He twice held the world distance record, both set in Planica, with a jump of 219.5 metres on 20 March 1999 and 231 m on 20 March 2005.

Tommy, himself a rock guitarist (Arabs in Aspic), is the son of musician Dag Ingebrigtsen.

== Sports results ==
- 1995 FIS Nordic World Ski Championships – Gold: Individual large hill
- 2003 FIS Nordic World Ski Championships- Silver: Individual normal hill, Bronze: Team large hill
- 2006 Winter Olympics – Bronze: Team large hill

== World Cup ==
=== Standings ===
Season	Overall	4H	SF	NT
1993/94	49	42	—	
1994/95	—	—	—	
1995/96	57		—	
1996/97	48		15	
1997/98	48		43	
1998/99	11		18	
1999/00	13		3rd place, bronze medalist(s)	
2000/01	11		5	
2001/02	43			
2002/03	35			
2003/04	11			
2004/05	25			
2005/06	23			

== Ski jumping world records ==
Date	Hill	Location	Metres	Feet
20 March 1999	Velikanka bratov Gorišek K185	Planica, Slovenia	219.5	720
20 March 2005	Letalnica bratov Gorišek HS215	Planica, Slovenia	231	758

Records
Preceded by Martin Schmitt	World's longest ski jump 219.5 m (720 ft); 20 March 1999 – 16 March 2000	Succeeded by Thomas Hörl
Preceded by Matti Hautamäki	World's longest ski jump 231 m (758 ft); 20 March 2005 – 20 March 2005	Succeeded by Bjørn Einar Romøren
