= FIS Ski Flying World Championships 2000 =

2000 edition of the FIS Ski-Flying World Championships

- Official logo for the FIS Ski Flying World Championships 2000.
- Host city: Vikersund, Norway
- Nations: 15
- Athletes: 47
- Events: 1
- Opening: 11 February
- Closing: 14 February
- Main venue: Vikersundbakken

The FIS Ski Flying World Ski Championships 2000 took place on 14 February 2000 in Vikersund, Norway for the third time. Vikersund hosted the championships previously in 1977 and 1990. The event was limited to three jumps due to weather conditions.

== Individual ==
14 February 2000

Medal	Athlete	Points
Gold	Sven Hannawald (GER)	536.8
Silver	Andreas Widhölzl (AUT)	522.6
Bronze	Janne Ahonen (FIN)	484.1

== Medal table ==
Rank	Nation	Gold	Silver	Bronze	Total
1	Germany (GER)	1	0	0	1
2	Austria (AUT)	0	1	0	1
3	Finland (FIN)	0	0	1	1
Totals (3 entries)		1	1	1	3
