= Martin Schmitt =

German ski jumper

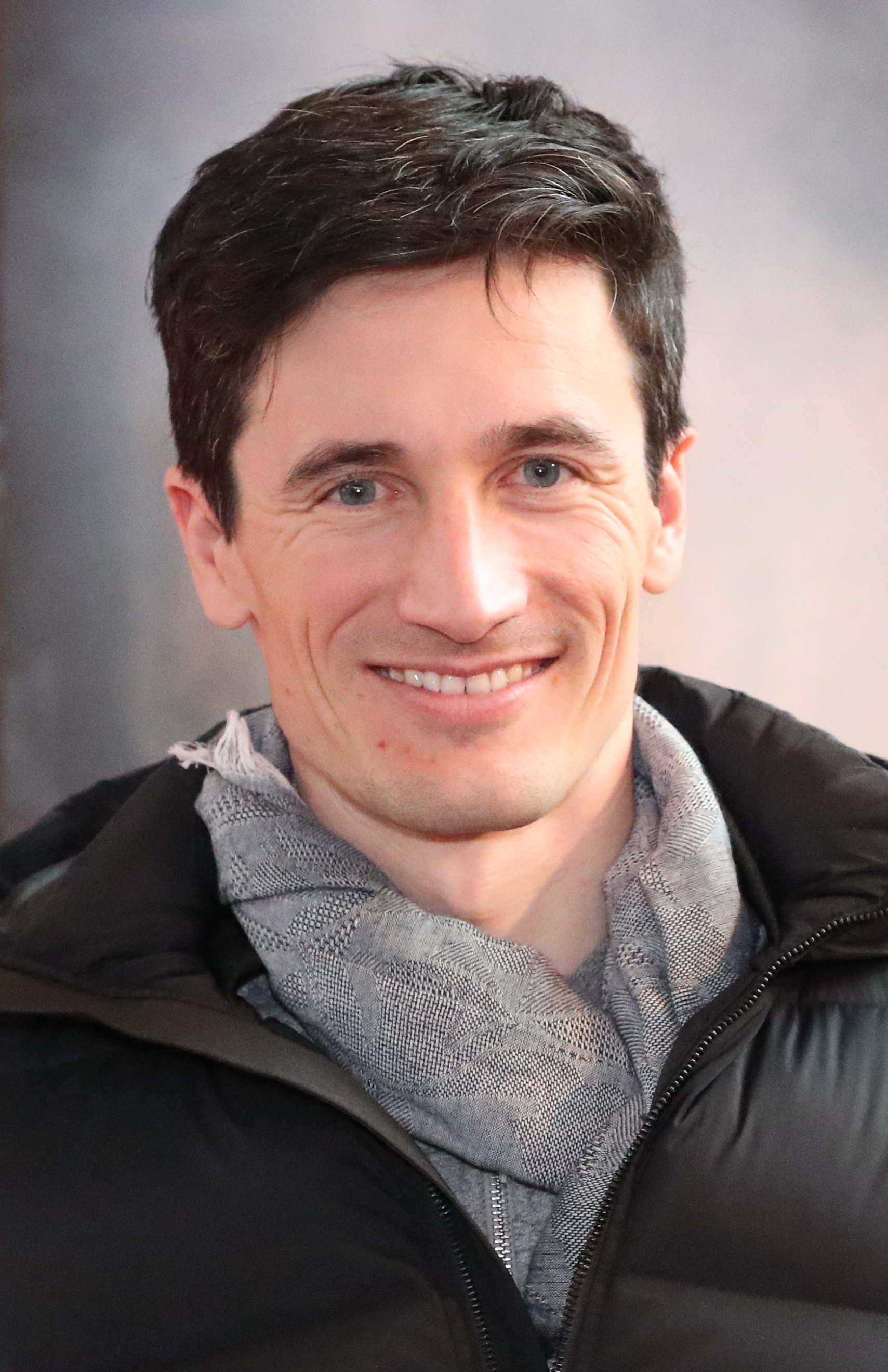
- Schmitt in 2018

Personal information
- Nationality: Germany
- Born: 29 January 1978 (age 48) Villingen-Schwenningen, West Germany
- Height: 1.82 m (5 ft 11 1/2 in)

Sport
- Sport: Skiing

World Cup career
- Seasons: 1997–2014
- Indiv. starts: 292
- Indiv. podiums: 52
- Indiv. wins: 28
- Team starts: 31
- Team podiums: 15
- Team wins: 2
- Overall titles: 2 (1999, 2000)
- Ski Flying titles: 2 (1999, 2001)
- JP titles: 1 (2000)

Achievements and titles
- Personal bests: 224 m (735 ft); Planica, 23 Mar 2002
Medal record
Men's ski jumping
Olympic Games
Gold medal – first place	2002 Salt Lake City	Team LH
Silver medal – second place	1998 Nagano	Team LH
Silver medal – second place	2010 Vancouver	Team LH
World Championships
Gold medal – first place	1999 Ramsau	Team LH
Gold medal – first place	1999 Ramsau	Individual LH
Gold medal – first place	2001 Lahti	Individual LH
Gold medal – first place	2001 Lahti	Team LH
Silver medal – second place	2001 Lahti	Individual NH
Silver medal – second place	2005 Oberstdorf	Team NH
Silver medal – second place	2009 Liberec	Individual LH
Bronze medal – third place	1997 Trondheim	Team LH
Bronze medal – third place	2001 Lahti	Team NH
Bronze medal – third place	2011 Oslo	Team NH
Men's ski flying
World Championships
Silver medal – second place	2002 Harrachov	Individual
- Updated on 10 February 2016

Martin Schmitt (German pronunciation: [ˈmaʁtiːn ʃmɪt]; born 29 January 1978) is a German former ski jumper who competed from 1997 to 2014. He is one of Germany's most successful ski jumpers, having won the World Cup twice; a gold medal at the Winter Olympics; four gold medals at the World Championships; and a ski flying world record. His and his countryman Sven Hannawald's success further popularized ski jumping in Germany, and with particular help from cable TV station RTL, their coverage received great acclaim in the late 1990s and early 2000s.

== Career ==
Beginning his competitive career at the Furtwangen area skiing club in Germany, Schmitt's first great success came when, as a schoolboy at the Furtwangen ski boarding school, he achieved a bronze medal in the 1997 FIS Nordic World Ski Championships in Trondheim. The following season, he won the team large hill silver at the 1998 Winter Olympics in Nagano.

In 1998/99 Schmitt won the team World Cup for the first time and triumphed at the 1999 FIS Nordic World Ski Championships in Ramsau by winning the individual and team large hill events. He successfully defended his World Cup title in 1999–2000.

Schmitt enjoyed particular world success in ski jumping between 1999 and 2001. With 28 world cup successes (10 in the 1998/1999 season, 11 in 1999/00, 6 in 2000/01, and 1 in 2001/02), he finished seventh in the world rankings behind Gregor Schlierenzauer (53 victories), Matti Nykänen (46 victories), Adam Małysz (39 victories), Kamil Stoch (39 victories), Janne Ahonen (36 victories), and Jens Weißflog (33 victories). At the FIS Nordic World Ski Championships, he won eight medals (including four gold), and at the Winter Olympics he won two silver medals and one gold medal.

He had his best season in 2000/01 by finishing second behind Adam Małysz for the World Cup title. At the 2001 FIS Nordic World Ski Championships in Lahti, he won both the individual and team large hills. In addition he gained a silver medal in the individual normal hill and a bronze in the team normal hill. Consequently, he became the first ski jumper to win four medals at the FIS Nordic World Ski Championships.

After the 2001 season, Schmitt began to suffer from injuries, and could no longer equal his earlier successes. Nonetheless, in the 2001/2002 season he won another team gold at the 2002 Winter Olympics in Salt Lake City, as well as winning silver in the 2002 Ski Flying World Championships in Harrachov. His last world cup success was on 1 March 2002 in Lahti.

After many back injuries in the 2004/05 season, he did not take part in the World Cup for many weeks, in order that he could be better prepared for the 2005 FIS Nordic World Ski Championships in Oberstdorf. There he won a silver medal in the team normal hill. Schmitt returned to win a silver in the individual large hill event at the FIS Nordic World Ski Championships 2009 in Liberec.

Despite the lack of wins for over a decade Schmitt continues to compete. For the 2012/13 season he had to compete in the second tier FIS Ski Jumping Continental Cup. Until just days before the start of the prestigious Four Hills Tournament it looked as if he would not be nominated for the first time since the 1996/1997 edition. A surprise win at the Continental Cup competition at Engelberg (Switzerland) just two days before the first four hills competition at Oberstdorf earned him a last-minute inclusion in the 'national group', a group of additional German entries allowed for the first two jumps at Oberstdorf and Garmisch-Partenkirchen. By performing strongly, even being the best-placed German after the first jump at Garmisch-Partenkirchen, Schmitt got a surprise promotion back into the main squad, which allows him to participate in the two Austrian competitions in Innsbruck and Bischofshofen.

== World Cup ==
=== Standings ===
Season	Overall	4H	SF	NT	JP
1996/97	55	35	—	—	52
1997/98	27	27	37	12	24
1998/99	1st place, gold medalist(s)	4	1st place, gold medalist(s)	5	2nd place, silver medalist(s)
1999/00	1st place, gold medalist(s)	3rd place, bronze medalist(s)	14	7	1st place, gold medalist(s)
2000/01	2nd place, silver medalist(s)	3rd place, bronze medalist(s)	1st place, gold medalist(s)	3rd place, bronze medalist(s)	N/A
2001/02	5	7	N/A	5	N/A
2002/03	23	20	N/A	11	N/A
2003/04	20	16	N/A	30	N/A
2004/05	37	33	N/A	15	N/A
2005/06	39	50	N/A	22	N/A
2006/07	17	14	N/A	14	N/A
2007/08	19	8	N/A	24	N/A
2008/09	6	4	13	6	N/A
2009/10	29	21	—	30	N/A
2010/11	30	29	45	N/A	N/A
2011/12	65	52	—	N/A	N/A
2012/13	39	10	—	N/A	N/A
2013/14	78	42	—	N/A	N/A

=== Wins ===
No.	Season	Date	Location	Hill	Size
1	1998/99	28 November 1998	(Norway) Lillehammer	Lysgårdsbakken K120 (night)	LH
2	1998/99	29 November 1998	(Norway) Lillehammer	Lysgårdsbakken K120 (night)	LH
3	1998/99	5 December 1998	(France) Chamonix	Le Mont K95	NH
4	1998/99	8 December 1998	(Italy) Predazzo	Trampolino dal Ben K120 (night)	LH
5	1998/99	30 December 1998	(Germany) Oberstdorf	Schattenbergschanze K115	LH
6	1998/99	1 January 1999	(Germany) Garmisch-Partenkirchen	Große Olympiaschanze K115	LH
7	1998/99	23 January 1999	(Japan) Sapporo	Ōkurayama K120	LH
8	1998/99	4 March 1999	(Finland) Kuopio	Puijo K120 (night)	LH
9	1998/99	11 March 1999	(Sweden) Falun	Lugnet K115 (night)	LH
10	1998/99	19 March 1999	(Slovenia) Planica	Velikanka bratov Gorišek K185	FH
11	1999/00	27 November 1999	(Finland) Kuopio	Puijo K120 (night)	LH
12	1999/00	18 December 1999	(Poland) Zakopane	Wielka Krokiew K116	LH
13	1999/00	19 December 1999	(Poland) Zakopane	Wielka Krokiew K116	LH
14	1999/00	30 December 1999	(Germany) Oberstdorf	Schattenbergschanze K115	LH
15	1999/00	8 January 2000	(Switzerland) Engelberg	Gross-Titlis-Schanze K120	LH
16	1999/00	9 January 2000	(Switzerland) Engelberg	Gross-Titlis-Schanze K120	LH
17	1999/00	22 January 2000	(Japan) Sapporo	Ōkurayama K120	LH
18	1999/00	23 January 2000	(Japan) Sapporo	Ōkurayama K120	LH
19	1999/00	26 February 2000	(United States) Iron Mountain	Pine Mountain Ski Jump K120	LH
20	1999/00	27 February 2000	(United States) Iron Mountain	Pine Mountain Ski Jump K120	LH
21	1999/00	5 March 2000	(Finland) Lahti	Salpausselkä K116 (night)	LH
22	2000/01	24 November 2000	(Finland) Kuopio	Puijo K120 (night)	LH
23	2000/01	3 December 2000	(Finland) Kuopio	Puijo K120 (night)	LH
24	2000/01	29 December 2000	(Germany) Oberstdorf	Schattenbergschanze K115	LH
25	2000/01	24 January 2001	(Japan) Hakuba	Olympic Hills K120 (night)	LH
26	2000/01	3 March 2001	(Germany) Oberstdorf	Heini-Klopfer-Skiflugschanze K185	FH
27	2000/01	18 March 2001	(Slovenia) Planica	Velikanka bratov Gorišek K185	FH
28	2001/02	1 March 2002	(Finland) Lahti	Salpausselkä K116 (night)	LH

== Ski jumping world records ==
Date	Hill	Location	Metres	Feet
19 March 1999	Velikanka bratov Gorišek K185	Planica, Slovenia	219	719
19 March 1999	Velikanka bratov Gorišek K185	Planica, Slovenia	214.5	704

Not recognized! Ground touch at world record distance.

Awards
Previous: Georg Hackl	German Sportspersonality of the year 1999	Next: Nils Schumann
Records
Preceded by Lasse Ottesen; 212 m (696 ft)	World's longest ski jump 214.5 m (704 ft); 19 March 1999 – 20 March 1999	Succeeded by Tommy Ingebrigtsen; 219.5 m (720 ft)
