= Hideharu Miyahira =

Japanese former ski jumper (born 1973)

Hideharu Miyahira 宮平 秀治
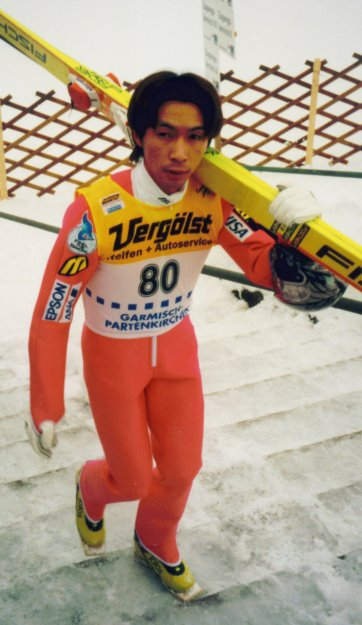

Personal information
- Full name: 宮平 秀治
- Nationality: Japan
- Born: 23 December 1973 (age 52) Otaru, Hokkaido, Japan

Sport
- Sport: Skiing

World Cup career
- Seasons: 1994–2006
- Indiv. starts: 181
- Indiv. podiums: 10
- Indiv. wins: 1
- Team starts: 16
- Team podiums: 7
- Team wins: 1

Achievements and titles
- Personal bests: 213.5 m (700 ft); Planica, 20–23 March 2003
Medal record
Men's ski jumping
FIS Nordic World Ski Championships
Silver medal – second place	1999 Ramsau	Individual NH
Silver medal – second place	1999 Ramsau	Team LH
Silver medal – second place	2003 Val di Fiemme	Team LH
Bronze medal – third place	1999 Ramsau	Individual LH
- Updated on 10 February 2016

Hideharu Miyahira (宮平 秀治, Miyahira Hideharu) (born 21 December 1973) is a Japanese former ski jumper.

== Career ==
Miyahira won four medals at the FIS Nordic World Ski Championships with three silver (individual and team large hills in 1999, team large hill in 2003) and one bronze (individual normal hill in 1999).

He competed at the 2002 Winter Olympics in Salt Lake City, finishing 5th in the team large hill and 24th in the individual large hill. He also competed at the Ski Flying World Championships, with best finishes of 5th in the team competition in 2004 and 10th in the individual competition in 2000.

He is one of so far only seven jumpers in history who managed to achieve perfect marks from all five judges (20 points maximum) for his second jump at the World Cup competition in Willingen in 2003.

== World Cup ==
=== Standings ===
Season	Overall	4H	SF	NT	JP
1993/94	—	—	—	N/A	N/A
1994/95	—	—	—	N/A	N/A
1995/96	—	—	—	N/A	—
1996/97	40	52	24	—	47
1997/98	36	—	22	44	88
1998/99	5	3rd place, bronze medalist(s)	3rd place, bronze medalist(s)	6	8
1999/00	10	7	12	29	10
2000/01	16	22	21	31	N/A
2001/02	18	16	N/A	23	N/A
2002/03	11	11	N/A	10	N/A
2003/04	31	—	N/A	20	N/A
2004/05	35	39	N/A	49	N/A
2005/06	60	—	N/A	—	N/A

=== Wins ===
No.	Season	Date	Location	Hill	Size
1	1998/99	20 March 1999	(Slovenia) Planica	Velikanka bratov Gorišek K185	FH
